= Baylor University =

Baptist university in Waco, Texas, US

- Motto: Pro Ecclesia, Pro Texana, Pro Mundo (Latin)
- Motto in English: "For Church, For Texas, For the World"
- Type: Private research university
- Established: February 1, 1845; 181 years ago
- Accreditation: SACS
- Religious affiliation: Baptist General Convention of Texas
- Academic affiliations: CCCU; CRL; NAICU; ASAIHL
- Endowment: $2.6 billion (FY2026)
- Budget: $995.8 million (FY2026)
- President: Linda Livingstone
- Provost: Nancy Brickhouse
- Faculty: 1,209 (fall 2024)
- Students: 20,626 (fall 2024)
- Undergraduates: 14,915 (fall 2024)
- Postgraduates: 5,711 (fall 2024)
- Location: Waco, Texas, United States; 31.548°N 97.116°W
- Campus: Midsize city, 1,000 acres (4.0 km^{2})
- Newspaper: The Baylor Lariat
- Colors: Green and Gold
- Nickname: Bears
- Sporting affiliations: NCAA Division I FBS – Big 12
- Mascots: Judge Indy and Judge Belle (live bears); Bruiser and Marigold (costumed)
- Website: baylor.edu

Baylor University is a private Baptist research university in Waco, Texas, United States. It was chartered in 1845 by the last Congress of the Republic of Texas. Located on the banks of the Brazos River next to I-35, between the Dallas–Fort Worth Metroplex and Austin. It is affiliated with the Baptist General Convention of Texas.

As of fall 2024, Baylor had a total enrollment of 20,626 students (14,915 undergraduate and 5,711 graduate). It is one of 146 US universities classified among "R1: Doctoral Universities – Very High Research Activity". The university grants undergraduate and graduate degrees, including doctoral and professional degrees. Baylor University's athletic teams, the Bears, participate in 19 intercollegiate sports. The university is a member of the Big 12 Conference in NCAA Division I.

== History ==
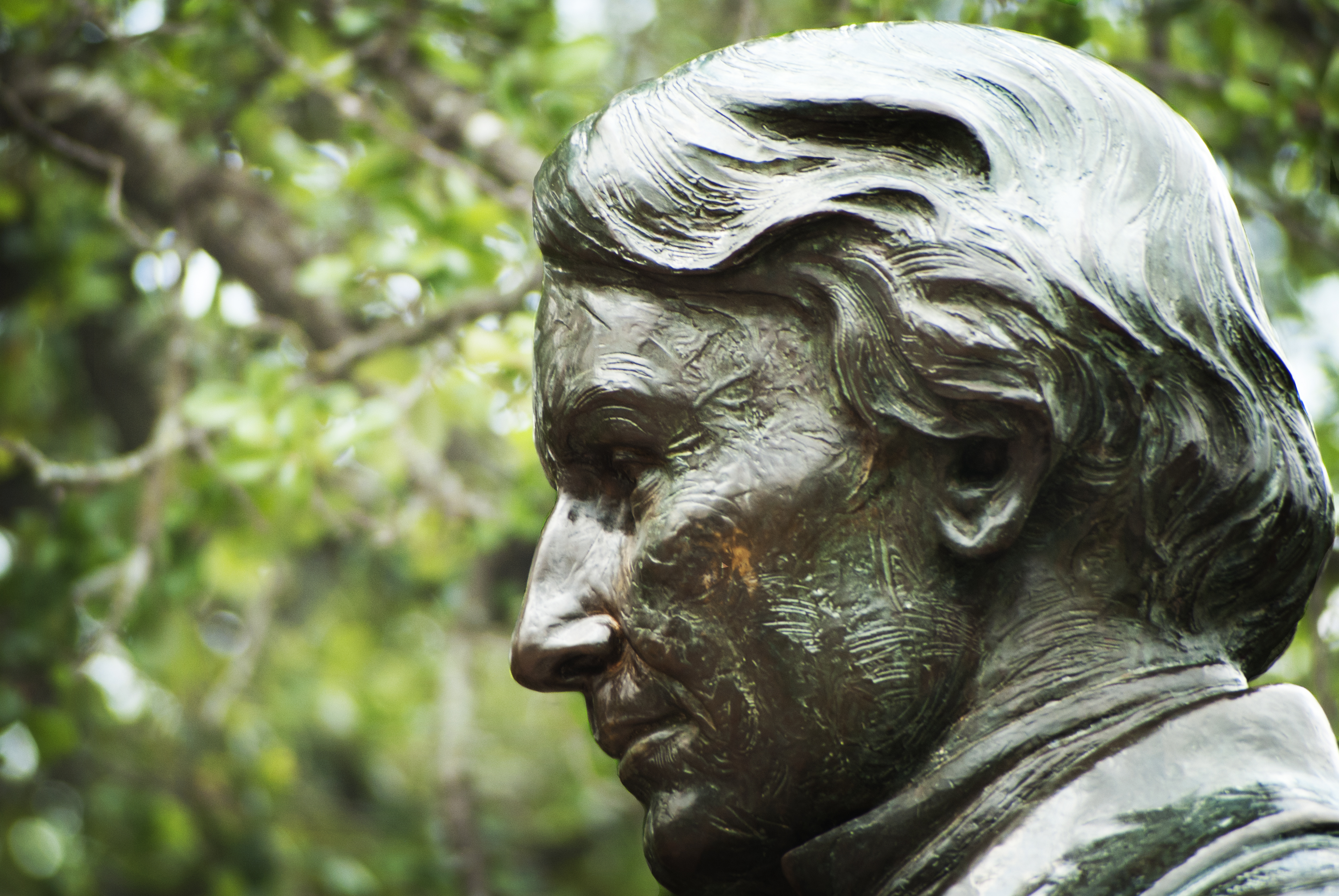
This statue of Judge Baylor is at the front of Founder's Mall in the heart of campus.

In 1841, 35 delegates to the Union Baptist Association meeting voted to adopt the suggestion of William Milton Tryon and R. E. B. Baylor to establish a Baptist university in Texas, then called the Republic of Texas (a republic independent of the United States). Baylor, a Texas district judge and onetime US congressman and soldier from Alabama, became the school's namesake. Some at first wished to name the new university "San Jacinto" to recognize the victory which enabled the Texans to become an independent nation, then before the final vote of the Congress, the petitioners requested the university be named in honor of Baylor.

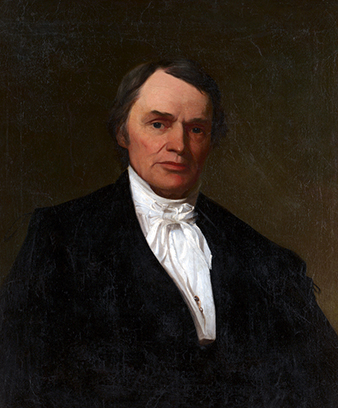
Judge R. E. B. Baylor

In fall 1844, the Texas Baptist Education Society petitioned the Congress of the Republic of Texas to charter a Baptist university. Republic President Anson Jones signed the Act of Congress on February 1, 1845, officially establishing Baylor University. The founders built the original university campus in Independence, Texas. The James Huckins, the first Southern Baptist missionary to Texas, was Baylor's first full-time fundraiser. He is considered the third founding father of the university. Although these three men are credited as being the founders of the university, many others worked to see the university established in Texas and thus they were awarded Baylor's Founders Medal. The noted Texas revolutionary war leader and hero Sam Houston gave the first $5,000 donation to start the university. In 1854, Houston was also baptized by Rufus Columbus Burleson, future Baylor president, in the Brazos River.

During the 1846 school year Baylor leaders would begin including chapel as part of the Baylor educational experience. The tradition continues today and has been a part of the life of students for over 160 years. In 1849, R. E. B. Baylor and Abner S. Lipscomb of the Texas Supreme Court began teaching classes in the "science of law", making Baylor the first in Texas and the second university west of the Mississippi to teach law. During this time Stephen Decatur Rowe would earn the first degree awarded by Baylor. He would be followed by the first female graduate, Mary Kavanaugh Gentry, in 1855.

In 1851, Baylor's second president, Rufus Columbus Burleson, decided to separate the students by sex, making the Baylor Female College an independent and separate institution. Baylor University became an all-male institution. During this time, Baylor thrived as the only university west of the Mississippi offering instruction in law, mathematics, and medicine. At the time a Baylor education cost around $8–15 per term for tuition. And many of the early leaders of the Republic of Texas, such as Sam Houston, would later send their children to Baylor to be educated. Some of those early students were Temple Lea Houston, son of President Sam Houston, a famous western gun-fighter and attorney; and Lawrence Sullivan "Sul" Ross famous Confederate general and later President of Texas A&M University.

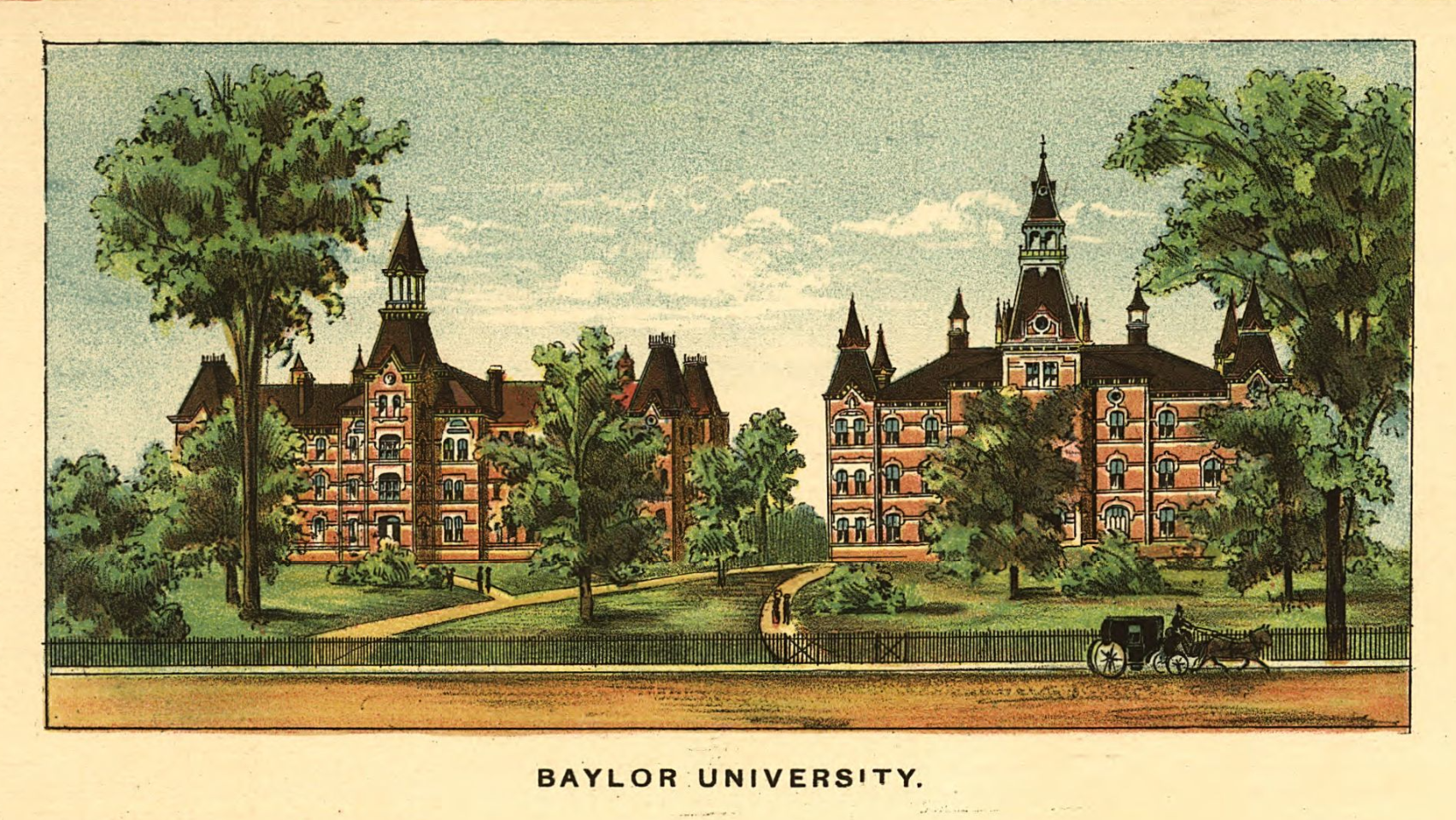
In 1892, Baylor University had two main buildings, Old Main and Burleson Hall

For the first half of the American Civil War, the Baylor president was George Washington Baines, maternal great-grandfather of the future US president, Lyndon B. Johnson. He worked vigorously to sustain the university during the Civil War, when male students left their studies to enlist in the Confederate Army. Following the war, the city of Independence slowly declined, primarily caused by the rise of neighboring cities being serviced by the Santa Fe Railroad. Because Independence lacked a railroad line, university fathers began searching for a location to build a new campus.

In 1885, Baylor University rechartered, and moved to Waco, Texas, where it was absorbed into a local college called Waco University. At the time, Burleson, Baylor's second president, was serving as the local college's president. That same year, the Baylor Female College also was moved to a new location, Belton, Texas. It later became known as the University of Mary Hardin-Baylor. A Baylor College Park still exists in Independence in memory of the college's history there. Around 1887, Baylor University began readmitting women and became coeducational again.

In the 1890s, William Cowper Brann published the highly successful Iconoclast newspaper in Waco. One of his targets was Baylor University. Brann revealed Baylor officials had been importing South American children recruited by missionaries and making house-servants out of them. Brann was shot in the back by Tom Davis, a Baylor supporter. Brann then wheeled, drew his pistol, and killed Davis. Brann was helped home by his friends, and died there of his wounds.

In 1900, three physicians founded the University of Dallas Medical Department in Dallas, although a university by that name did not exist. In 1903, Baylor University acquired the medical school, which became known as the Baylor College of Medicine, while remaining in Dallas. In 1943, Dallas civic leaders offered to build larger facilities for the university in a new medical center if the College of Medicine would surrender its denominational alliances with the Baptist state convention. The Baylor administration refused the offer and, with funding from the M. D. Anderson Foundation and others, moved the College of Medicine to Houston. In 1969, the Baylor College of Medicine became technically independent from Baylor University. The two institutions still maintain strong links and Baylor still elects around 25 percent of the medical school's regents. They also share academic links and combine in research efforts.

During World War II, Baylor was one of 131 colleges and universities nationally that took part in the V-12 Navy College Training Program which offered students a path to a Navy commission.

The university first admitted black students in 1964. The first black graduate was Robert Gilbert, of Waco.

In 1991, Baylor began appointing the majority of its board, granting it partial independence from the Baptist General Convention of Texas.

In 2015, the Baylor Board of Regents hired law firm Pepper Hamilton to perform an external review of Baylor's handling of sexual assaults. The report, summarized by the board in a public "Findings of Facts" document, stated that Baylor failed to implement Title IX in a timely and effective manner, that Baylor administrators actively discouraged reporting of sexual assaults, and that the athletic department failed to address sexual assaults. In response to the report, the Board of Regents fired Ken Starr as president of the university but retained him as Chancellor and as a law school professor; he resigned as Chancellor shortly thereafter and resigned as law professor in August 2016. The school also fired head football coach Art Briles. In 2018, Baylor paid Briles $15.1 M to settle his wrongful termination suit against the school.

In 2021, Baylor released an independent historical report acknowledging past slave ownership and support for the Confederacy by R. E. B. Baylor and two founders. These facts were not previously acknowledged by the university.

A ban on various forms of sexual conduct including "homosexual acts" was in place until 2015. The university has since modified its Code of Conduct.

In a May 1, 2023, letter to the Department of Education Office for Civil Rights, Baylor University's President Linda Livingstone requested a formal exemption from provisions of federal Title IX law related to the discrimination and harassment of LGBTQ+ individuals, on the basis that Baylor requires "purity in singleness and fidelity in marriage between a man and a woman as the biblical norm" and must "regulate conduct that is inconsistent with the religious values and beliefs that are integral to its Christian faith and mission." On July 25, 2023, the Office for Civil Rights responded acknowledging exemption to Title IX for a number of provisions related to discrimination against LGBTQ+ individuals, including "rules of private organizations" and "sexual harassment". The exemption request, notable for its specific claim of exemption to Title IX's sexual harassment provision specifically in response to three active investigations against Baylor by the Office for Civil Rights, including one investigation into "Baylor's alleged response to notice that students were subjected to harassment based on their sexual orientation and/or gender identity," led five US representatives, including Representative Adam Schiff, to write and sign a letter to Miguel Cardona, the Secretary of the US Department of Education, requesting "thorough, timely investigations into the pending sex-based harassment cases against Baylor University and further clarification on the implications of this particular exemption on students' rights to be protected from sex-based harassment."

== Academics ==
=== Rankings ===
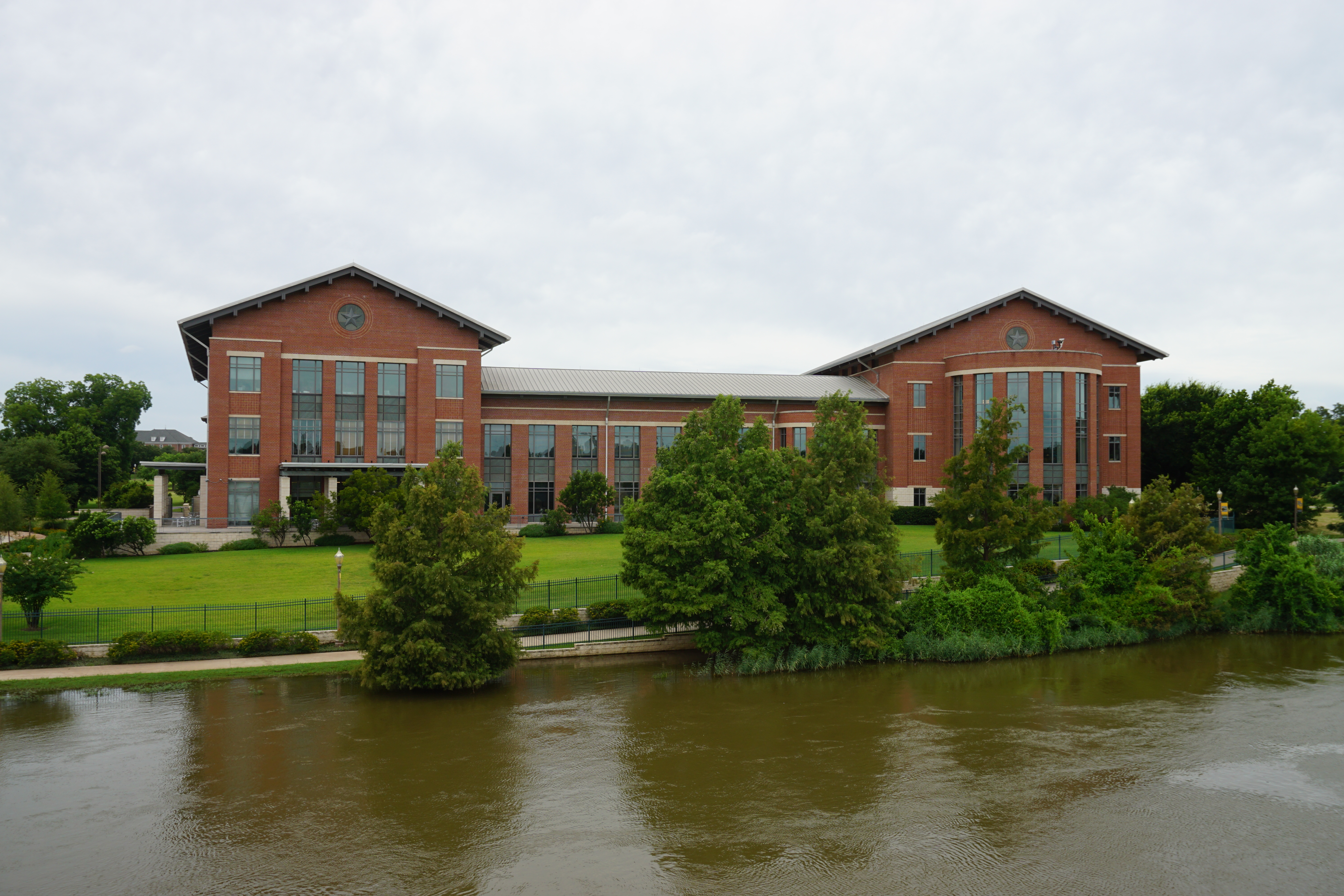
Baylor Law School on the Brazos River

Academic rankings

National
- Forbes: 188
- U.S. News & World Report: 88 (tie)
- Washington Monthly: 1,020
- WSJ/College Pulse: 363

Global
- ARWU: 601-700
- QS: 1,001–1,200
- THE: 801–1,000
- U.S. News & World Report: 440 (tie)

USNWR graduate school rankings
Business	54 (tie)
Education	114 (tie)
Engineering	163 (tie)
Law	43 (tie)
Nursing: Doctorate

USNWR departmental rankings
Biological Sciences	93 (tie)
Chemistry	74 (tie)
Clinical Psychology	91 (tie)
Earth Sciences	113 (tie)
English	90 (tie)
Health Care Management	12 (tie)
History	96 (tie)
Mathematics	103 (tie)
Nursing–Midwifery	22 (tie)
Occupational Therapy	53 (tie)
Physical Therapy	10 (tie)
Physics	95 (tie)
Political Science	96 (tie)
Psychology	95 (tie)
Public Health	68 (tie)
Social Work	51 (tie)
Sociology	91 (tie)
Speech–Language Pathology	74 (tie)
Statistics	66 (tie)

In the 2025 "Best Colleges" rankings by U.S. News & World Report, Baylor was ranked tied for 88th best "national university" in the U.S., tied at 27th for "Best Undergraduate Teaching", and tied at 38th for "Most Innovative".

Forbes ranked Baylor 188th out of the top 500 rated private and public colleges and universities in America for the 2025 report. Baylor was also ranked 109th among private colleges and 42nd in the south.

Baylor University is accredited by the Southern Association of Colleges and Schools.

=== Graduate rankings ===
Several Baylor graduate programs, including its law school, Hankamer School of Business and programs in the sciences and education are nationally ranked. According to the National Research Council (NRC), among those programs, Baylor's Graduate program in English was ranked first for Student Support and Outcomes by the National Research Council, and Baylor's Doctoral program in Sociology was ranked third nationally, based on criteria such as the percentage of students receiving full financial support, PhD completion percentage, median time to completion of degrees, and job placement rate.

=== Institutional organization ===
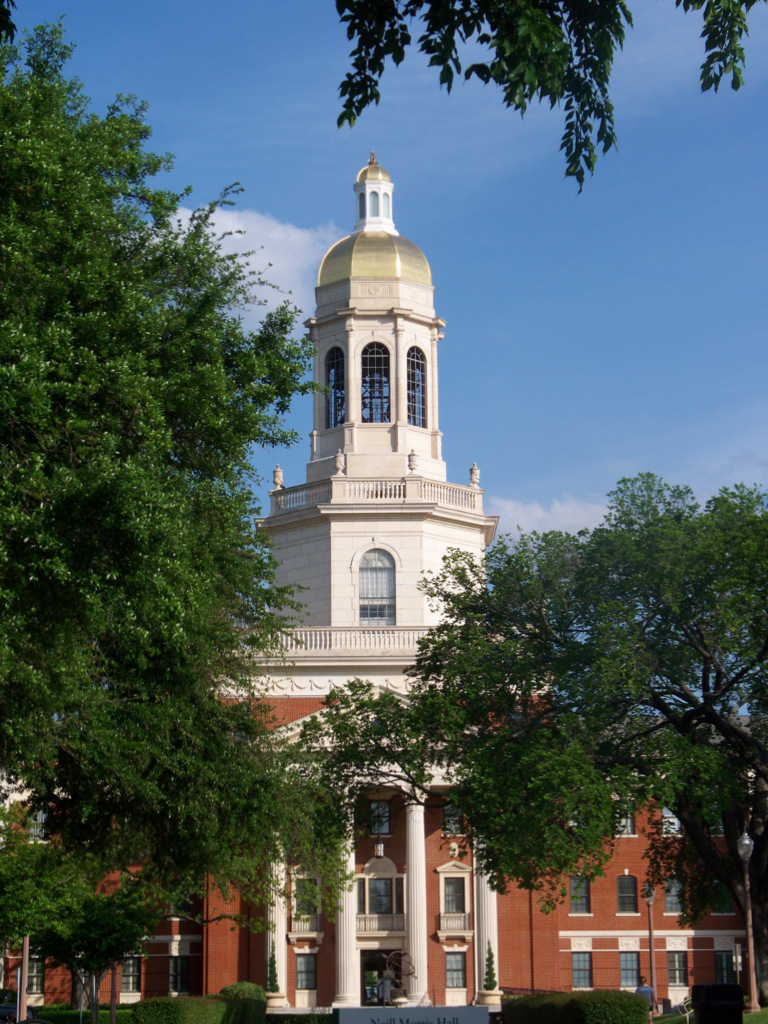
Pat Neff Hall houses the office of the university's president and others

The university is divided into twelve degree-granting academic units. Three of the units are designated as colleges, while eight others are designated as schools and one is a seminary. They are:

- College of Arts & Sciences
- Diana R. Garland School of Social Work
- George W. Truett Theological Seminary
- Graduate School
- Hankamer School of Business
- Honors College
- Law School
- Louise Herrington School of Nursing
- Robbins College of Health and Human Sciences
- School of Education
- School of Engineering & Computer Science
- School of Music

=== Robert Foster Cherry Award ===
The Robert Foster Cherry Award is a prize given biennially by Baylor University for "great teaching". The Cherry Award honors professors at the college or university level, in the English-speaking world, with records of teaching excellence and the ability to inspire students. Robert Foster Cherry, a graduate of Baylor (A.B., 1929), made an estate bequest to establish the award. In a typical award cycle, three finalists are selected based on nomination packages. The finalists then compete for the award by giving a series of lectures at Baylor University. Each finalist receives $15,000 and the award recipient receives an additional $250,000 prize.

Recipients have included:

- 2022, Hollylynne S. Lee, North Carolina State University (Mathematics)
- 2020, Jennifer Cognard-Black, St. Mary's College of Maryland (English)
- 2018, Neil Garg, UCLA (Chemistry)
- 2016, Mikki Hebl, Rice University (Psychology & Management)
- 2014, Meera Chandrasekhar, University of Missouri (Physics)
- 2012, Brian Coppola, University of Michigan (Chemistry)
- 2010, Edward B. Burger, Williams College (Mathematics)
- 2008, Stephen D. Davis, Pepperdine University (Biology)
- 2006, Anton Armstrong, St. Olaf College (Choral Music)
- 2004, Eleonore Stump, Saint Louis University (Philosophy)
- 1998, Robert H. Bell, Williams College (English) and Paul G. Ashdown (Journalism)

== Student life ==
Student body composition as of May 2, 2022
Race and ethnicity	Total
White	61%
Hispanic	16%
Asian	8%
Other (Note: Other consists of Multiracial Americans & those who prefer to not say.)	6%
Black	5%
Foreign national	4%
Economic diversity
Low-income (Note: The percentage of students who received an income-based federal Pell grant intended for low-income students.)	16%
Affluent (Note: The percentage of students who are a part of the American middle class at the bare minimum.)	84%

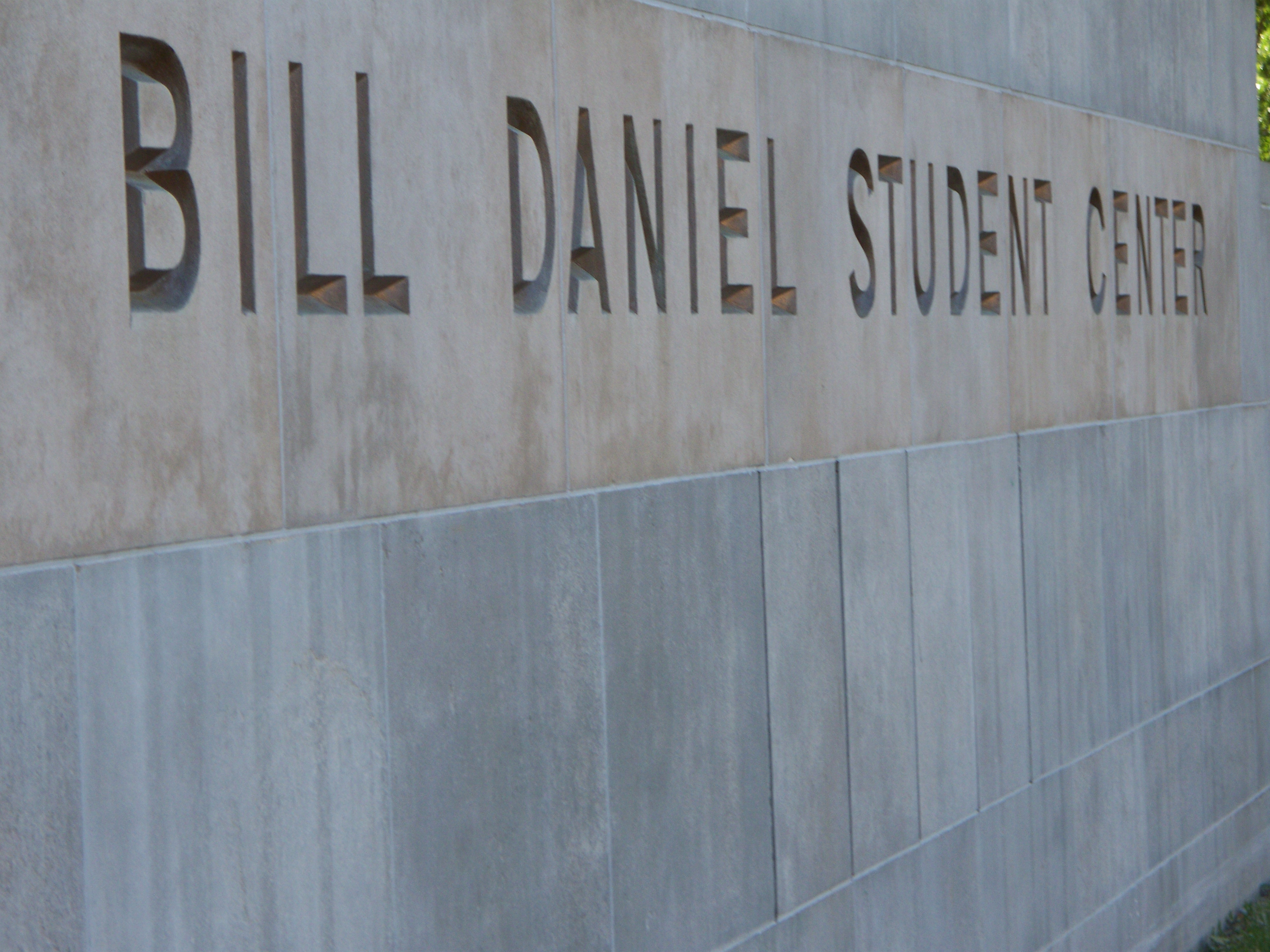
The sign inscribed Baylor's Student Union Building (SUB)

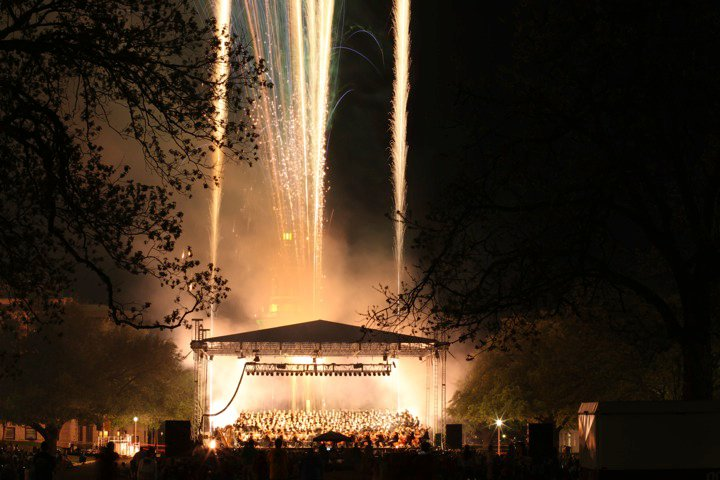
Student choirs and orchestras performing the 1812 Overture on Fountain Mall for the 2009 President's Concert.

More than 16,000 students study at Baylor University, representing all 50 states, the District of Columbia and approximately 89 foreign countries. The university clubs and organizations provide each student with an opportunity to become engaged with an organization that shares their interests. Baylor University has a total undergraduate enrollment of 13,859, with a gender distribution of 42 percent male students and 58 percent female students. At Baylor, 36 percent of students live in college-owned, -operated, or -affiliated housing and 64 percent of students live off campus.

=== Clubs and organizations ===
==== Greek organizations ====
Approximately 14 percent of undergraduate men are members of fraternities, and 21 percent of undergraduate women are members of a sorority. There are four councils that oversee Greek life at Baylor which in turn is governed by student activities. The four councils are the Interfraternity Council (IFC), the Unified Greek Council (UGC), the National Pan-Hellenic Council (NPHC), and the Panhellenic Council (PHC). Relations between the administration at Baylor University and the Greek organizations have often been fractious, with chapters being suspended by the university authorities at various times. Most of the university's fraternities began as local fraternities, before affiliating with their national organizations in the late 1970s, although some local organizations have refrained from attaching themselves to a national chapter, notably Phi Kappa Chi and Kappa Omega Tau.

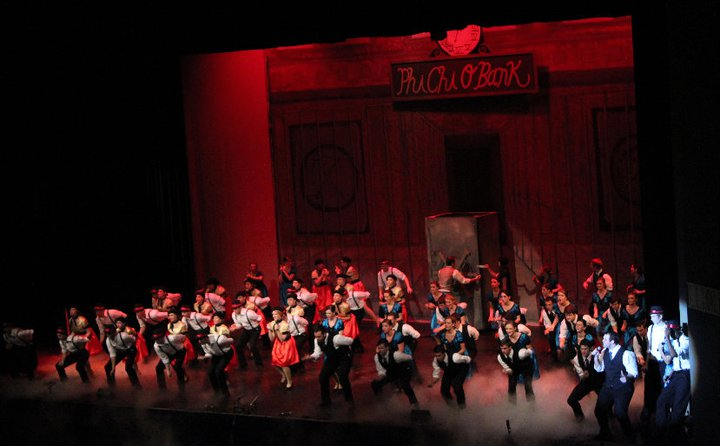
Phi Kappa Chi and Chi Omega performing at Baylor University's 2011 All-University Sing

==== LGBT organizations ====
In 2013, a university official said that Baylor could not have an LGBTQ student organization on campus because of the complexity of the issue. In 2021, an unofficial LGBTQ student organization on campus, Gamma Alpha Upsilon, or GAY in Greek letters, was founded. In 2022, Baylor chartered an official LGBT organization called "Prism", that follows the University's "Statement on Human Sexuality", which affirms "purity in singleness and fidelity in marriage between a man and a woman as the biblical norm" and prohibits advocacy groups from promoting "understandings of sexuality that are contrary to biblical teaching", including "homosexual behavior".

=== Student activities ===
Every semester, students participate in various intramural sports. Students build teams within campus organizations, sororities/fraternities, residence halls, and personal friend groups. As of Fall 2022, Baylor offers these intramural sports:

Fall semester	Spring semester
Dodgeball	5-on-5 basketball
Indoor volleyball	Table tennis
Ultimate Frisbee	Singles tennis
Tennis mixed doubles	Co-ed sand volleyball
Kickball	Soccer
Canoe battle	Spikeball
Flag football (7v7)	Softball
Racquetball	Track
Pickleball	
Spikeball (co-ed)	

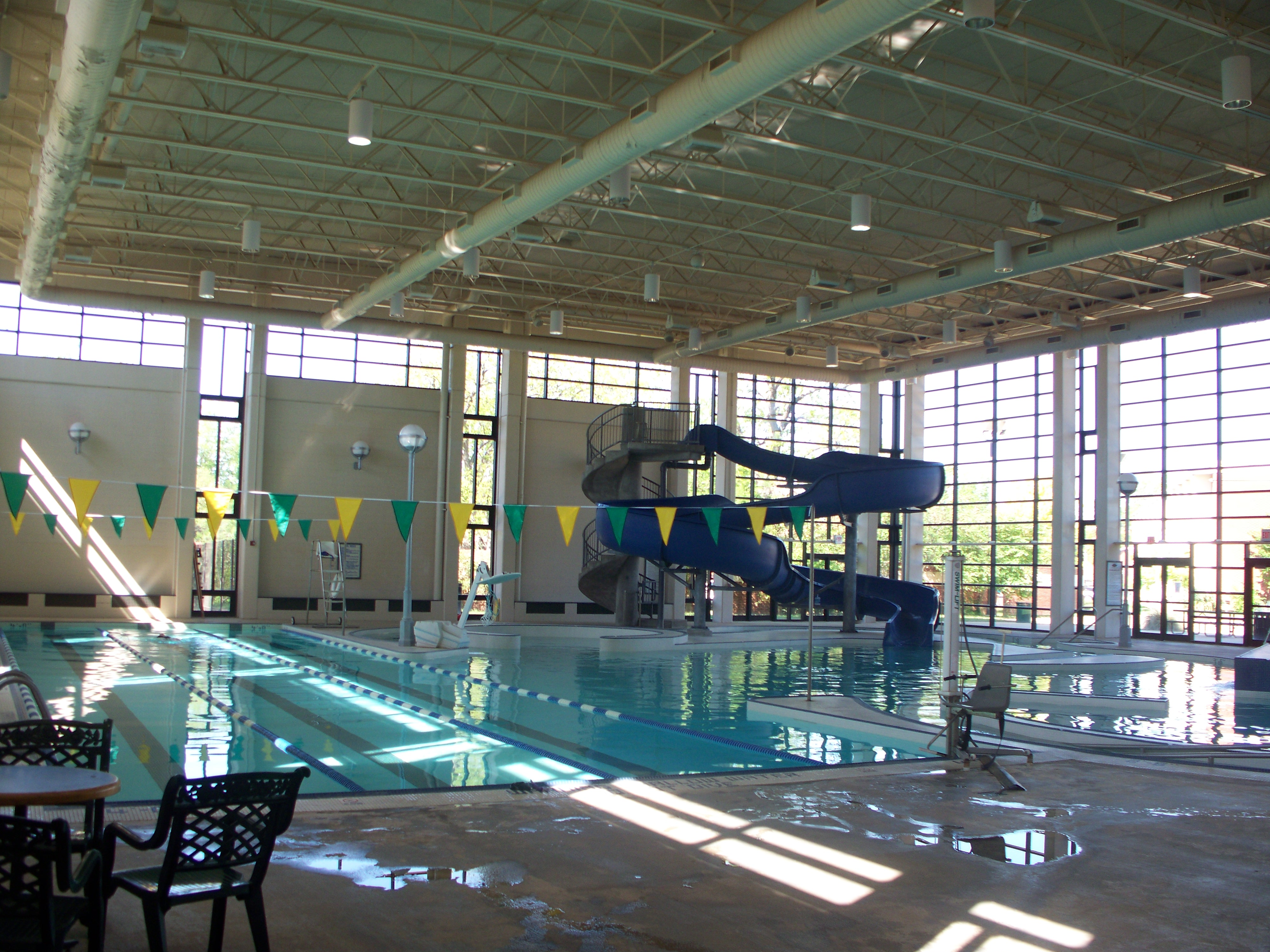
The pool in the Student Life Center (SLC)

=== Golden Wave Band ===
The 2012 Homecoming halftime performance by the Baylor University Golden Wave Band

The Baylor University Golden Wave Band (BUGWB) is the halftime entertainment for Baylor football. The 340-member band attends every home football game and sometimes travels to away games. The band's name dates back to 1928 when, while on tour in West Texas, observers noted that the band members' gold uniforms looked like a giant "golden wave" sweeping over the landscape.

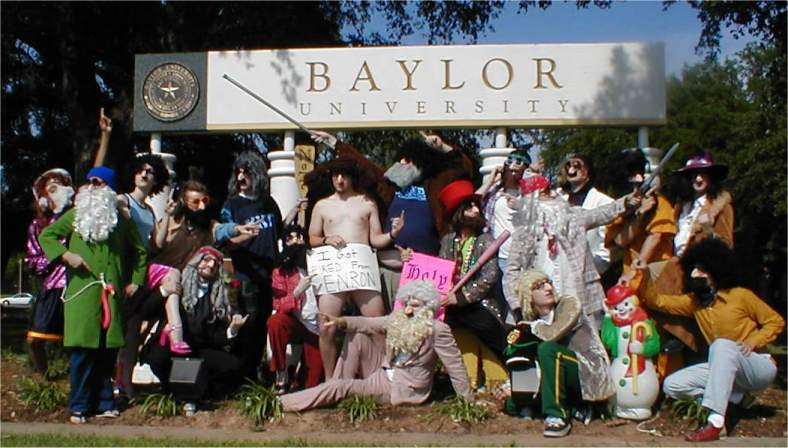
Members of The NoZe Brotherhood in 2002

=== Noble NoZe Brotherhood ===
The Noble NoZe Brotherhood, an unofficial fraternal organization, was founded in 1924 to study the art of bridge construction in association with the BBA (Baylor Bridge Association). The brotherhood provides the university with unusual public pranks and satirical writings in its newspaper, The Rope. Members hide their identities to keep their actions anonymous.

=== Baylor Chamber of Commerce ===
The Baylor Chamber of Commerce, a co-educational spirit organization, was founded in 1919 to uphold Baylor's most cherished traditions. Today, the Chamber of Commerce helps plan the Homecoming celebration and parade, Family Weekend, Diadeloso, and Baylor Line events. The Chamber also cares for Judge Indy and Judge Belle, Baylor's live bear mascots.

=== Military programs ===
Formal military instruction began on campus in 1888.

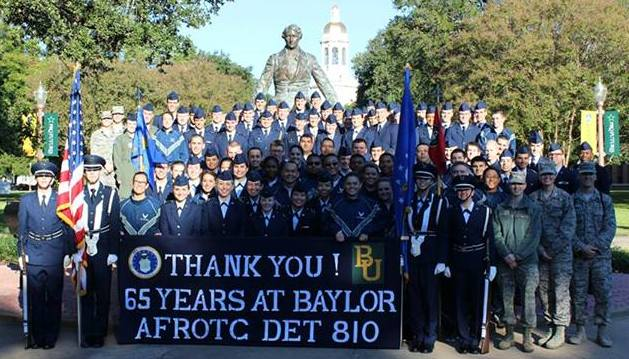
Baylor University's Air Force ROTC program celebrated 65 years in 2013.

Baylor has had several famous military graduates such as Andrew Jackson Lummus, Jr., who fought and died at the Battle of Iwo Jima during World War II and received the Medal of Honor for his service. John Riley Kane also received the Medal of Honor.

In July 1948, the Air Force and Baylor University partnered in the creation of Air Force ROTC Detachment 810 - one of the first detachments ever created. In 2008, Detachment 810 was awarded the Air Force ROTC Right Of Line Award as the No. 1 large detachment in the nation. The unit was additionally awarded the High Flight Award, recognizing it as one of the top four detachments in America. It has been named best in the AFROTC Southwest Region for 1996, 2003 and 2008.

Baylor runs several postgraduate and professional health sciences programs in partnership with the Army Medical Department headquartered in San Antonio. Programs offered include the Doctor of Physical Therapy, MHA, United States Army Graduate Program in Nursing Anesthesia (USAGPAN), and MHA/MBA (joint program).

== Research and endowment ==
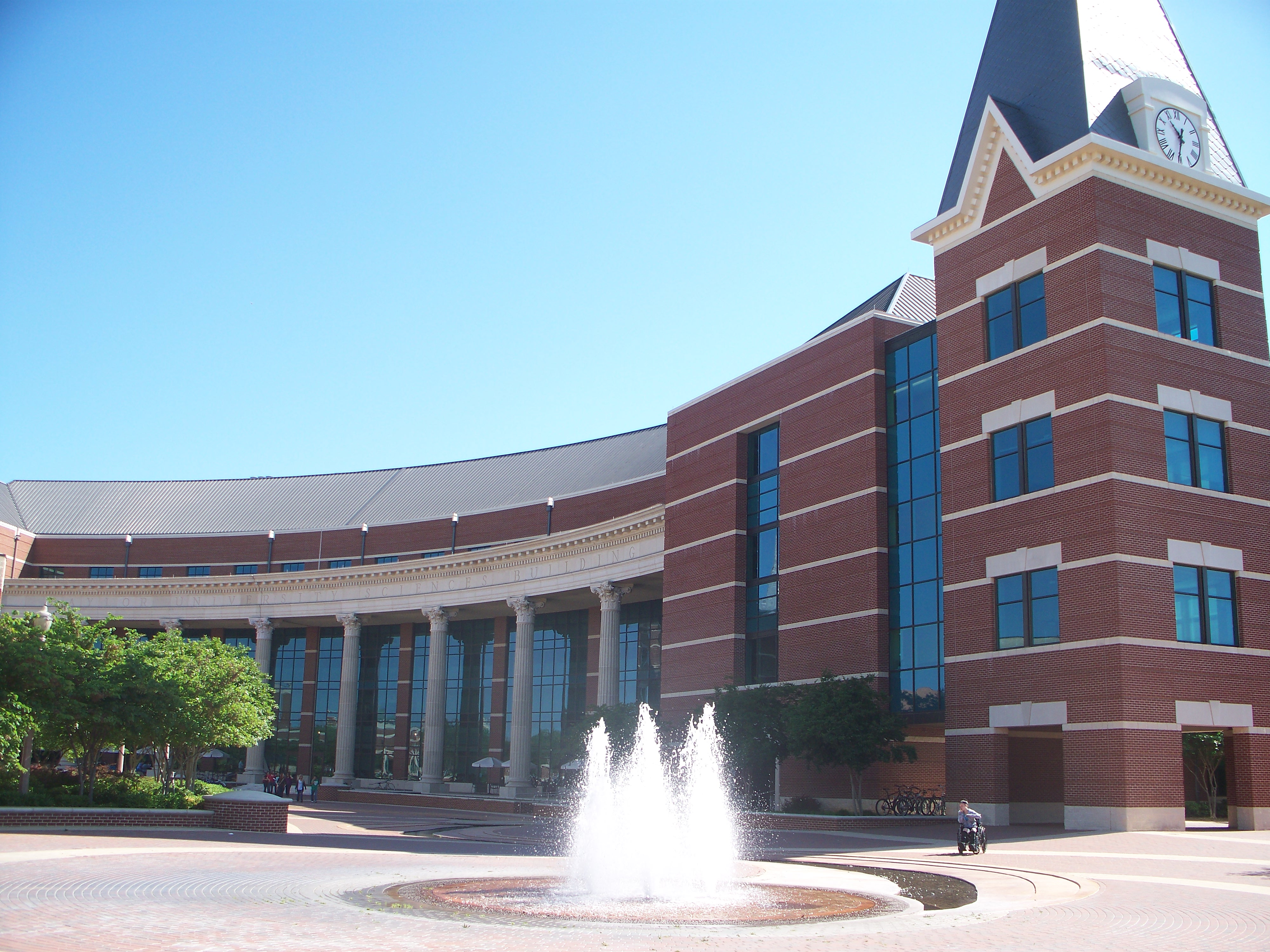
Baylor Sciences Building

In 2005, the university was invited to join the Collider Detector at Fermilab (CDF) collaboration at the Fermi National Accelerator Laboratory in Batavia, Illinois. The project is one of the world's largest experimental physics collaborations. The following year, the university was classified as "Research University" with "High Research Activity". In 2021, the university was classified among "R1: Doctoral universities with very high research activity".

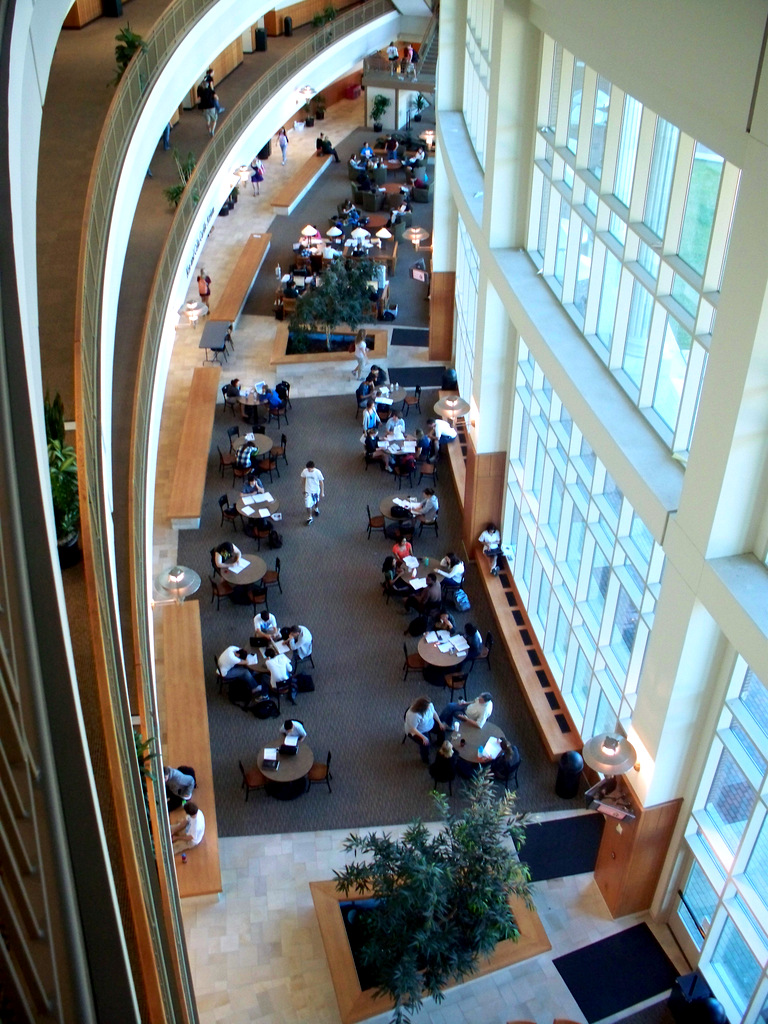
The interior of the Baylor Sciences Building

In October 2009, a group of state, county and city governments and organizations and higher educational institutions in Central Texas announced the creation of the Central Texas Technology and Research Park, and the park's first project, the Baylor Research and Innovation Collaborative (BRIC) to be housed in the former General Tire facility on South Loop Drive in Waco. Funding for the effort came from the state of Texas and Baylor University. Clifton Robinson (a member of Baylor's Board of Regents) donated the facility to the university to support the research collaborative.

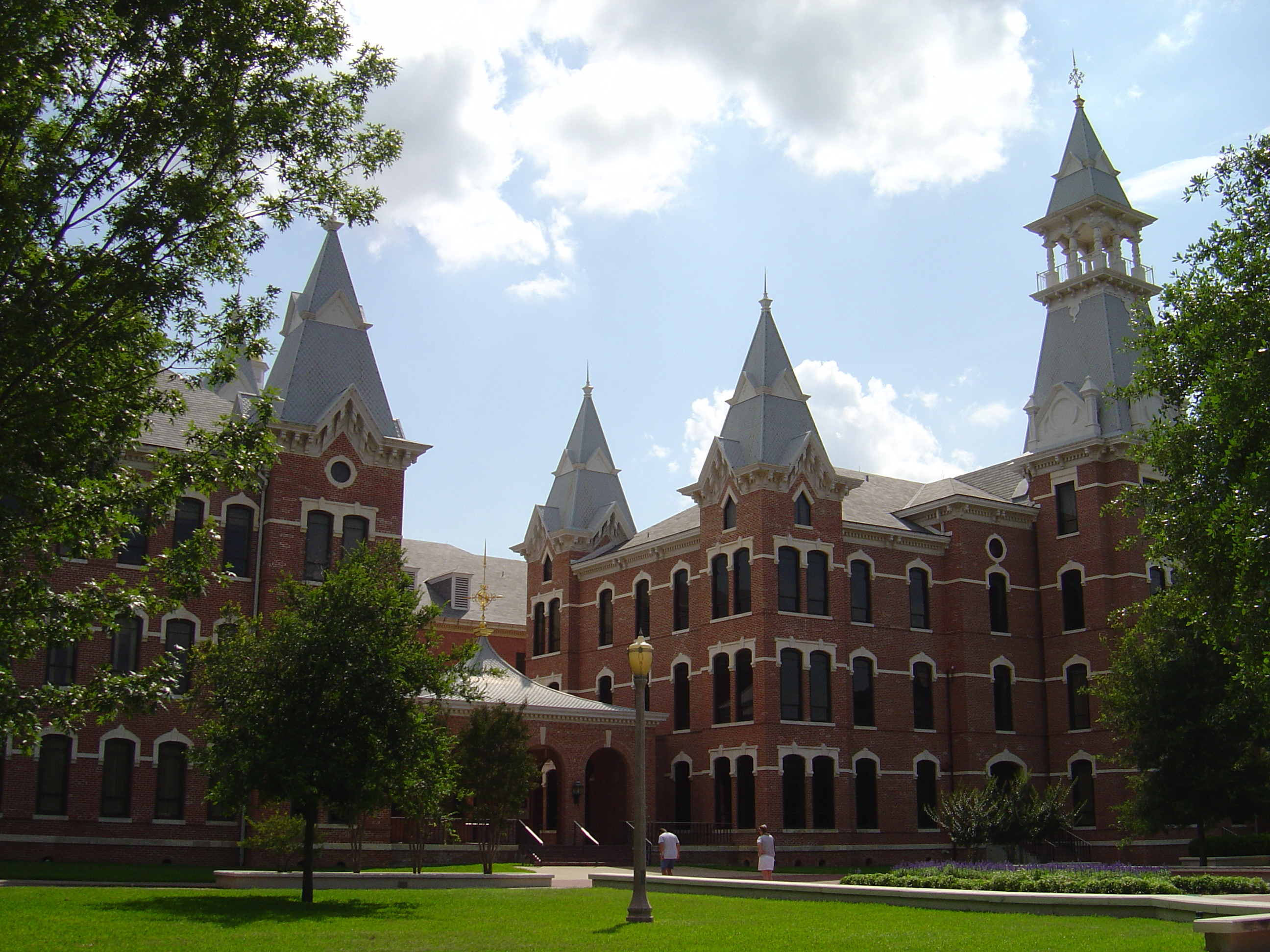
Burleson Quadrangle

Several former and present members of faculty at Baylor are or were prominent proponents of intelligent design, most notably philosopher William Dembski, now at Southwestern Baptist Theological Seminary, Christian philosopher Francis Beckwith and electrical engineer Robert J. Marks II.

The university's endowment passed $1 billion in 2007 and reached $1,055,478,000 on December 31, 2007. Even with the 2008 financial crisis, Baylor's endowment grew 5.1% in the fiscal year ending June 30, 2008; the National Association of College and University Business Officials estimated that during that same period, the median return for the top 25 percent of college endowments decreased by 2.2 percent. Fogleman cited the university's long-term investments and diversified holdings as the cause of the endowment's success. Despite a hired consulting firm's concerns that the troubled economy and disagreements within the Baylor community could hinder continued growth, the university's endowment exceeded $1.1 billion as of May 2013.

On March 4, 2010, "An anonymous longtime Baylor donor ... set up an estate provision that will benefit the school to the tune of an estimated $200 million. The gift will bolster Baylor's research on the issues of aging in multiple disciplines at the school." Citing the most recent data reported by the Chronicle of Higher Education, Baylor officials say the $200 million donation is the second-largest gift to a Texas college or university and ranks among the top 20 private gifts to higher education institutions in the country.

== Athletics ==

Men's sports	Women's sports
Baseball	Acrobatics & tumbling
Basketball	Basketball
Cross country	Cross country
Football	Equestrian
Golf	Golf
Tennis	Soccer
Track and field^{†}	Softball
	Tennis
	Track and field^{†}
	Volleyball
† – Track and field includes both indoor and outdoor

Baylor student athletes participate in NCAA Division I as part of the Big 12 Conference. As of the 2021–22 school year, all teams are nicknamed "Bears". Women's teams had historically been known as "Lady Bears", but by the end of the 2010s almost all of these teams had dropped "Lady", with the last three holdouts of basketball, soccer, and volleyball following suit in fall 2021. In the 2011–2012 season, Baylor broke the NCAA record for most combined wins in the four major collegiate sports: baseball, football, and men's and women's basketball.

The university has won NCAA titles in 2004, 2005, 2012, 2019, and 2021. The men's tennis team defeated UCLA in the 2004 championship match to garner the Baylor's first title. One year later, the Baylor Lady Bears basketball team beat Michigan State in the championship game and was subsequently named as the only women's team to be nominated for a 2005 "Best Team" ESPY. In 2012, the Baylor Lady Bears basketball team beat the Notre Dame Fighting Irish in the NCAA National Championship; the first college basketball team to ever finish with a perfect 40–0 record. The Bears men's basketball team won the 2021 NCAA National Championship after beating the Gonzaga Bulldogs 86–70. It is the university's first men's national championship.

The Baylor men's basketball team advanced to the Elite Eight of the NCAA 'March Madness' Championship tournament in 2010, 2012, and 2021. Under the direction of head coach Scott Drew, Baylor achieved a record of 121–55 (.688) between the 2008–2012 seasons and reached post-season play in four of those years. Four former Baylor basketball players were drafted in the first or second round of the NBA draft in the 2011 and 2012 seasons:Ekpe Udoh (first round), Perry Jones III, Quincy Acy (second round), Quincy Miller (second round).

=== Year of the Bear ===
The Year of the Bear is the name given to the 2011–2012 year in Baylor Athletics. During this year, the Baylor Bears football team defeated Big 12 rival Oklahoma (No. 5 AP) for the first time ever, as well as future bitter Big 12 rival TCU (No. 14 AP), ending the season at 10-3 ranked at No. 12 (No. 13 AP). Junior quarterback Robert Griffin III gained recognition throughout the year and was awarded both the 2011 Heisman Trophy and National Player of the Year honors. Meanwhile, the men's basketball team started with 17 straight wins en route to a 30–8 season (the best in school history), a berth in the NCAA Elite Eight (its second in three seasons) and a No. 10 final ranking. The women's basketball team won the program's second national title, becoming the first basketball program – men's or women's – to finish 40–0. Center Brittney Griner was named the National Player of the Year, while Coach Kim Mulkey was awarded National Coach of the Year. The baseball team won 49 games (one shy of its all-time best), including a Big 12-record 18-game conference winning streak and school-record 24-game winning streak. Although ranked at No. 1 for two weeks (a program first), the baseball team finished in the NCAA Super Regionals and a No. 9 ranking.

Baylor's four major programs (football, men's and women's basketball, and baseball) finished with an NCAA record 129 wins during the year (and an overall record of 129–28 for a winning percentage of .822) and Baylor was the only school to have all four programs ranked at the end of their respective seasons. The football and (men's and women's) basketball programs also set NCAA records with a combined 80 wins between them, including a stretch from November 1, 2011, to January 16, 2012, when the three programs had 40 consecutive wins between them.

Outside of the four major programs, Baylor was one of only two schools that had all 19 of its sponsored sports advance to the post season.

=== McLane Stadium ===
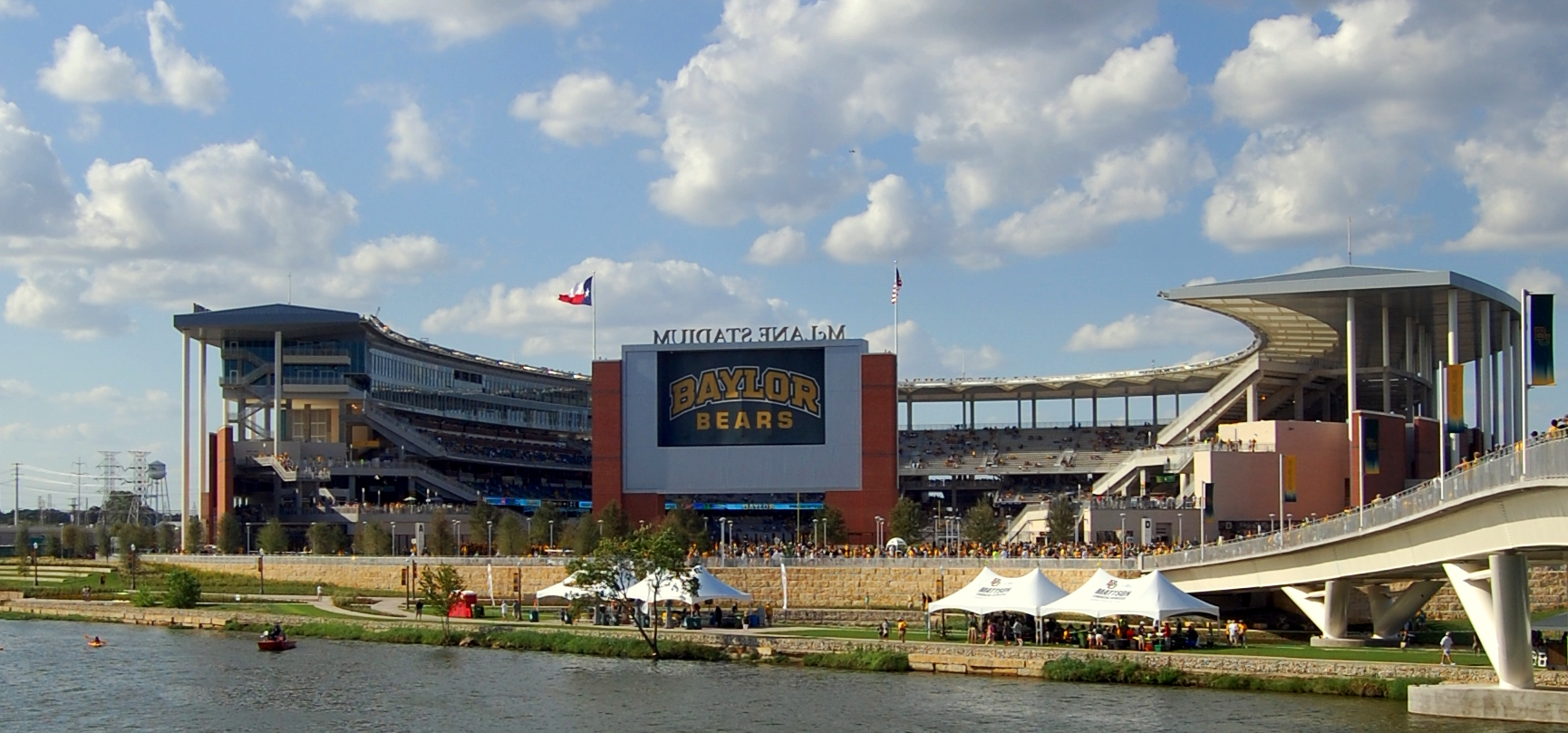
Baylor University's McLane Stadium

Following the 'Year of the Bear,' it was announced in July 2012 that a new $260 million football stadium to be called "McLane Stadium" would be constructed on the university's campus. Opened in fall 2014, the stadium holds 45,000 spectators and is situated on 93 acres (38 hectares) of land adjacent to the Brazos River and Interstate 35. The stadium was planned by architecture firm Populous, known for its design of Yankee Stadium in New York and Houston's Daikin Park. A partnership between Austin Commercial-Flintco LLC oversaw the project as its contractor.

From 1936 to 1949, the Baylor Bears home football games were played at Waco/Municipal Stadium. In 1950, the team moved to the newly constructed Floyd Casey Stadium (originally named Baylor Stadium), located four miles from campus with a seating capacity of up to 50,000 spectators. The stadium has been renovated several times, most notably in 1998 and 2005.

=== Mascots ===
Baylor's mascot is the American black bear. The university had two live bears on campus named Joy and Lady, each bearing the title of Judge in honor of Judge R.E.B. Baylor, one of the university's founders. Joy died on July 18, 2022, and Lady became a graduate of the class of 2023, officially retiring to a brand new facility off campus. The university announced in May 2023 that it was welcoming two new bear cubs to campus, cousins named Indy and Belle. The name "Indy" comes from "Independence", the town of Baylor's founding, and "Belle" pulls from the Carillon bells on campus. Like the past living mascots, they will reside on campus. The school's costumed mascots are Bruiser and Marigold.

Although Baylor began intercollegiate athletic competition in the 1890s, students did not elect the university's mascot until 1914. The other two dozen nominees included the bald eagle and the bookworm. Three years later, the 107th Engineers, a US Army troop stationed in Waco, gave Baylor its first live bear. The 107th Engineers had found the bear while traveling by train to Waco. After the troop left, the Baylor University Chamber of Commerce began caring for the animal. The organization still cares for the university's live bears.

One of the most famous Baylor mascots was "Big Joe" or "College Joe" in the 1930s. The bear (originally named Buckshot) was the pet of local businessman Herbert E. Mayr and was known to perform circus tricks and drink from a bottle at Mayr's business. The bear was housed at The Cotton Palace Zoo after it became too large to keep as a pet and destroyed the backseat of Mayr's car. Due to the expense of food, Mayr transferred responsibility for the bear to Waco attorney Woodie Zachery. It was later adopted by W.W. Boyd and soon began its 11 years as Baylor's mascot "College Joe". Following its death, the bear was stuffed and given a special display at the university.

The university's costumed mascot, Bruiser, was introduced at the beginning of the 1981–1982 basketball season. The mascot appears at football and basketball events, along with university pep rallies and community events. Bruiser also travels with the basketball team to games for the Big 12 Basketball Tournament, NIT and NCAA Tournaments.

== Traditions ==
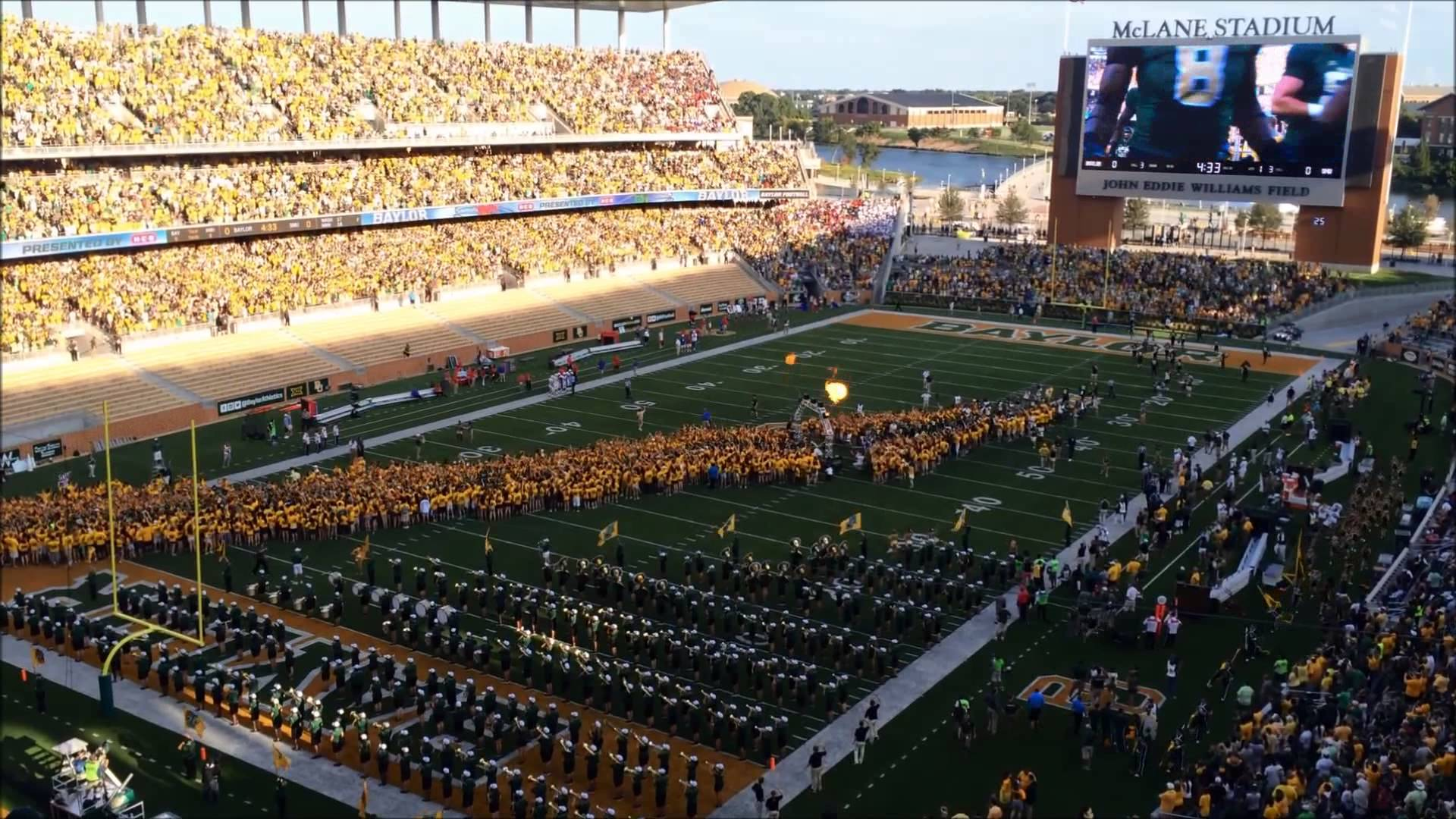
The Baylor Line on the field of a home football game

=== Baylor Line ===
The Baylor Line is a tradition for new students that began in 1970. Freshmen embrace the spirit of Baylor by wearing special football jerseys and rushing the field before home football games. Each "Line Jersey" has a nickname chosen by the student and their intended year of graduation on the back. From its inception until 1994, only male students were allowed to run the Line. Before the football game on Saturday, October 28, 2017, alumnae who were not allowed to run in the Line were invited to join the Freshmen in the run.

=== Mass Meeting ===
The Thursday night of Homecoming Week, new Baylor students (Freshmen and Transfers) attend a mass meeting in Waco Hall where they learn about the Immortal Ten, the ten student athletes who died in a bus-train accident in Round Rock, Texas, on January 22, 1927. After the Mass Meeting, the freshmen class build a bonfire on Fountain Mall which often includes burning vigils of the homecoming football opponent's mascot created by the various on campus houses.

=== Homecoming ===
The nation's first homecoming celebrations originated at Baylor in November 1909. Not long after, the idea was adopted by the University of Illinois in 1910, the University of Missouri in 1911, and at universities throughout the US in the years that followed. The Baylor Homecoming event began as a way to reconnect alumni with current students but has now grown to include a football game, bonfire, concerts, speeches, receptions, class reunions, pep rallies, and the nation's oldest and longest collegiate parade.

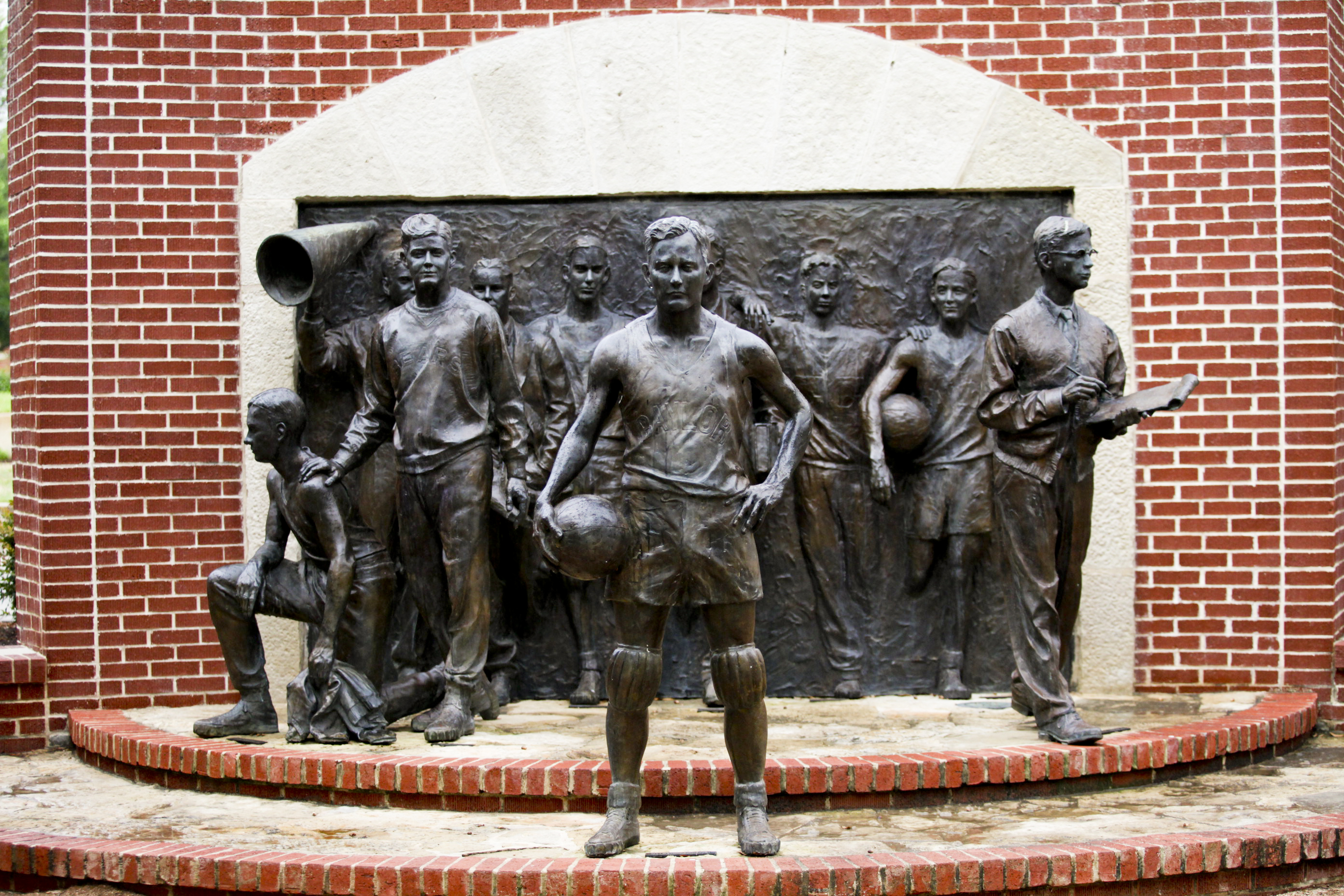
The Immortal Ten Memorial

=== Immortal Ten ===
On January 22, 1927, a bus carrying the Baylor basketball team collided with the Sunshine Special train in Round Rock, Texas. Ten members of the traveling party were killed and many others were injured in the accident. The story of the Immortal Ten is told each year at Freshman Mass Meeting, where the names of the ten are called out. In 1996, the senior class provided initial funding to create an Immortal Ten statue on campus. Fundraising and planning for the statue continued over the ensuing years. Finally, on June 22, 2007, the statue sculpted by Bruce R. Greene was unveiled. The Immortal Ten memorial was officially dedicated during Homecoming on November 2, 2007, in Traditions Square.

=== Alma mater ===
That Good Ol' Baylor Line
The Baylor University Men's Choir performing the university's alma mater, "That Good Ol' Baylor Line".

Baylor's alma mater is "That Good Ol' Baylor Line". In 1906, a student penned humorous words to the tune of "In the Good Old Summer Time" and they became generally accepted among the student body as the school fight song. The "Good Ol' Summer Time" tune was later arranged to fit the "Baylor Line" tune.

== Notable alumni, faculty and staff ==
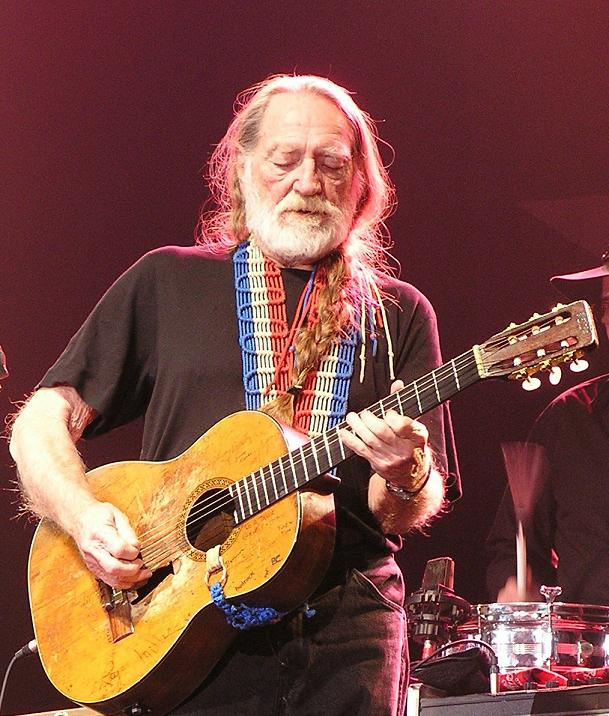
Willie Nelson attended Baylor

With more than 180,000 living alumni, Baylor is represented by notable individuals in an array of public and professional spheres.

Graduates acclaimed for their work in the arts include Pulitzer Prize-winning composer Steven Stucky, GMA Dove Award-winning composer Bruce Greer, Grammy Award-winning Christian recording artist Phil Driscoll, Christian recording artist David Crowder, Christian singer-songwriter Forrest Frank, Grammy-winning Gaither Vocal Band tenor David Phelps, screenwriter and director John Lee Hancock (with works including The Blind Side, nominated for the 2009 Academy Award for Best Picture), screenwriter Derek Haas (with works including 3:10 to Yuma and Wanted, both nominated for multiple Academy Awards), Emmy Award-nominated director Kevin Reynolds, Emmy-winning actress Angela Kinsey (the character of Angela Martin in NBC's The Office), Emmy-nominated actress Allison Tolman, Tony Award-nominated actress Elizabeth A. Davis, actress Carole Cook (a protégé of Lucille Ball), ventriloquist Jeff Dunham, and The Silence of the Lambs writer Thomas Harris.

Also alumni of the university are Chip and Joanna Gaines, who graduated in 1998 and 2001 respectively. They are the stars of the former HGTV show, Fixer Upper and are frequently involved in the Baylor community. In 2020, they left HGTV after being offered an opportunity to develop and star in their own network – Magnolia Network – which began airing in 2021 as part of the Discovery Family of Networks.

Alumni known for leadership in the private and public sectors include People Magazine co-founder Hal C. Wingo, The Weather Channel CFO Jerry Elliott, American Airlines CEO Thomas W. Horton, Western Refining CEO Paul Foster, Allbritton Communications Company (the parent company of Politico) founder Joe Allbritton, XTO Energy CEO Bob R. Simpson, chairman of the McLane Group and former owner of the Houston Astros Drayton McLane, Jr., Oracle Corporation CEO Mark Hurd, former chairman and CEO of Stanford Financial Group and convicted fraudster Allen Stanford, EXUSMED CEO and founder of Empowering Spirits Foundation A. Latham Staples, former mayor of San Antonio Phil Hardberger, former governor of Texas Ann Richards, former governor of Texas Mark Wells White Jr., United States circuit judge Jennifer Walker Elrod, United States circuit judge and former Supreme Court of Texas justice Don Willett, United States district judge Sidney A. Fitzwater, former Federal Bureau of Investigation director William S. Sessions, and ninth president of Goucher College Judy Jolley Mohraz.

Professional athletes who graduated from the university include quarterback and 2011 Heisman Trophy-winner Robert Griffin III, Phoenix Mercury WNBA player Brittney Griner, four-time Olympic gold medalist Michael Johnson, NFL Hall of Fame Member Mike Singletary, and Baseball Hall of Fame inductee Ted Lyons.

Grammy–winning recording artist Willie Nelson, actor Austin Miller and Senator Rand Paul attended Baylor.

Notable people

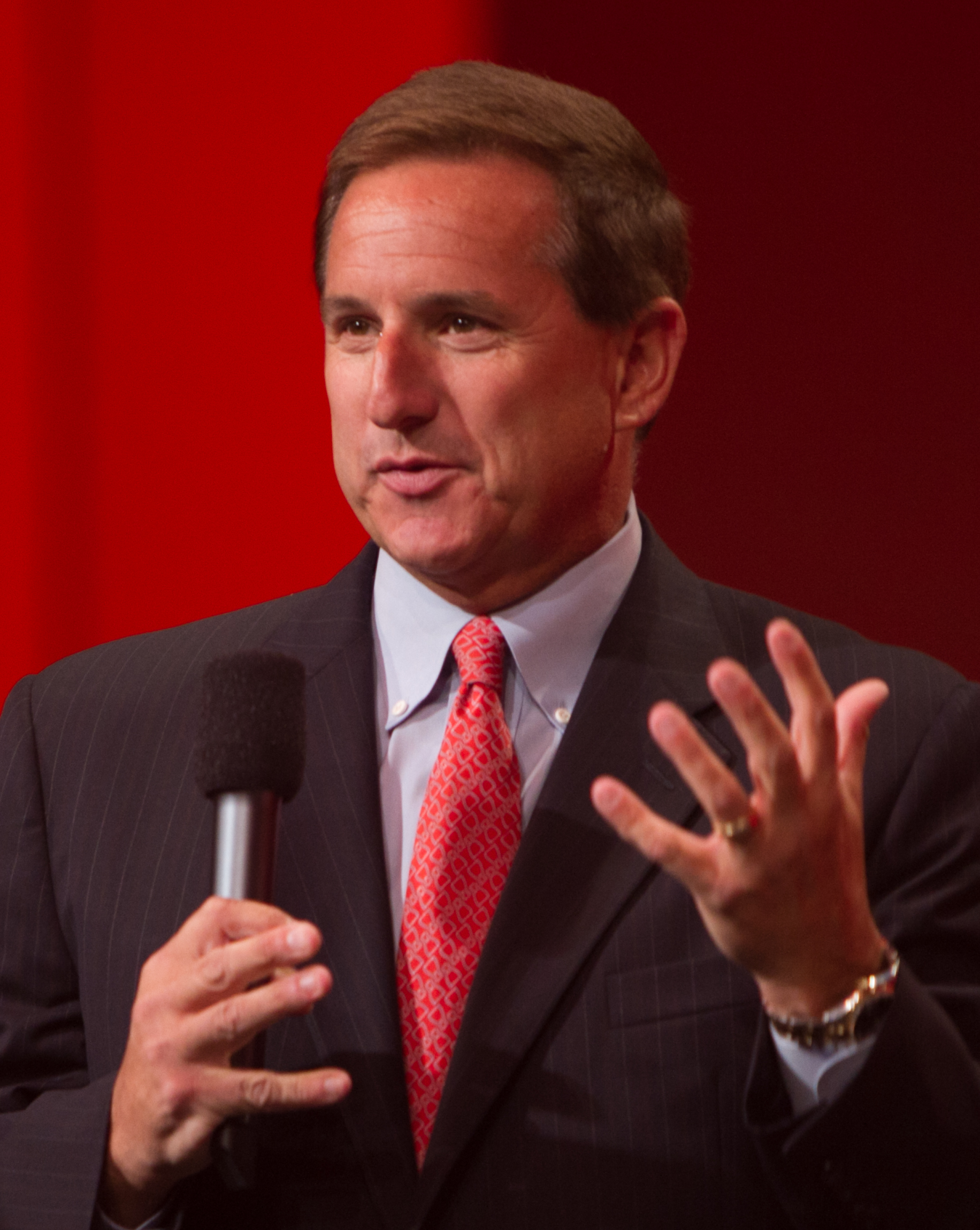
Mark Hurd
CEO of the Oracle Corporation and former CEO of Hewlett-Packard

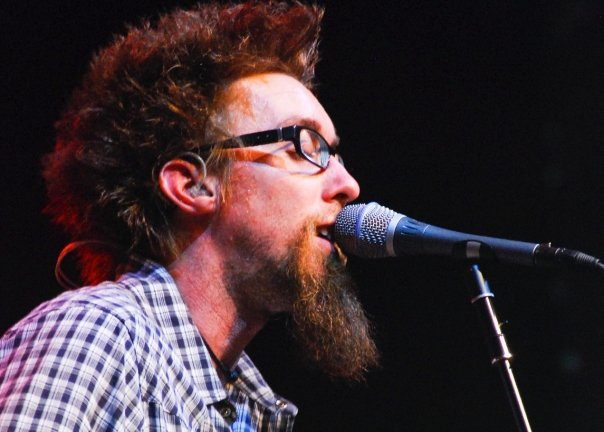
David Crowder
GMA Dove Award-winning Christian recording artist

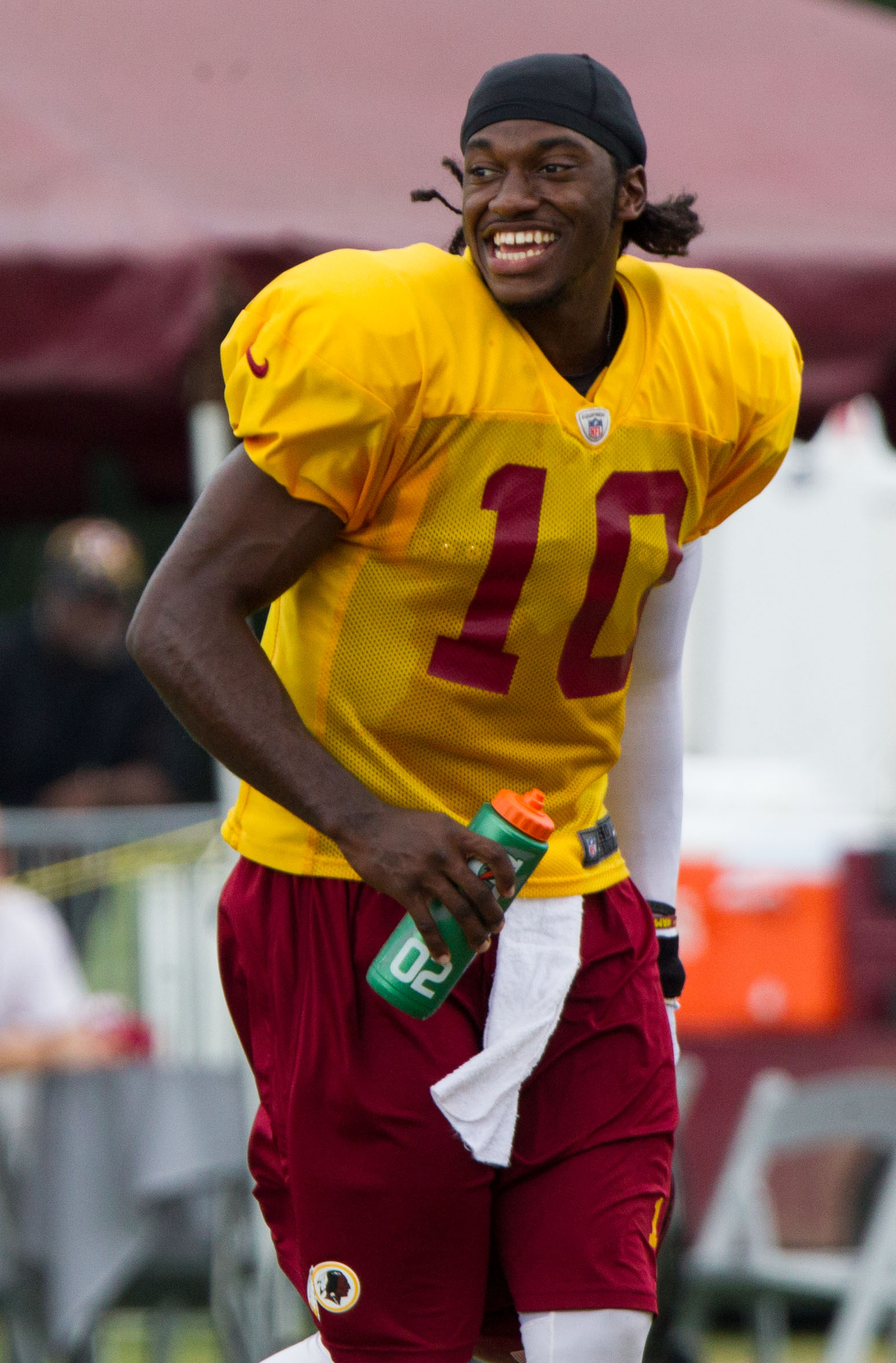
Robert Griffin III
Quarterback and winner of the 2011 Heisman Trophy

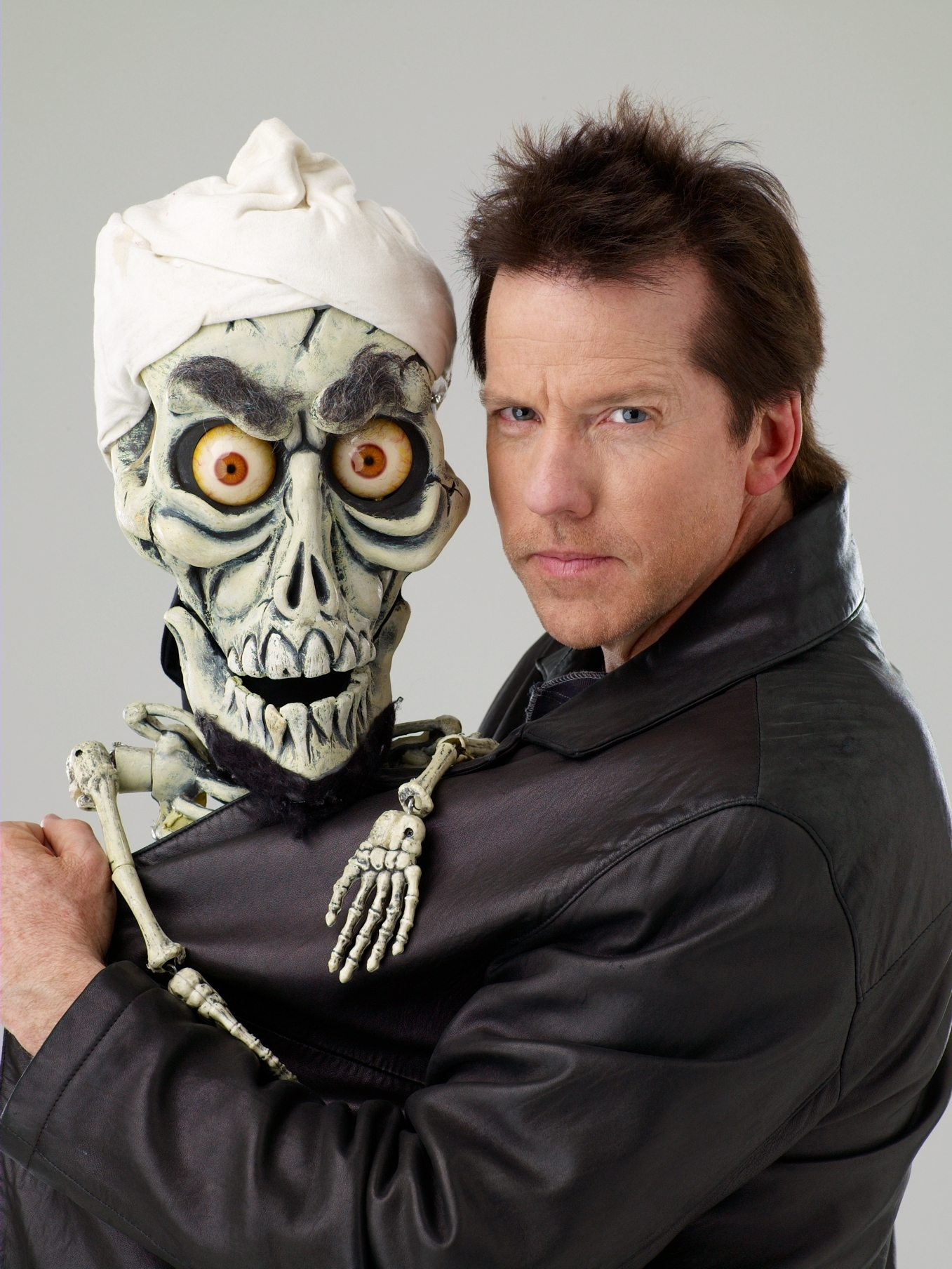
Jeff Dunham
Ventriloquist

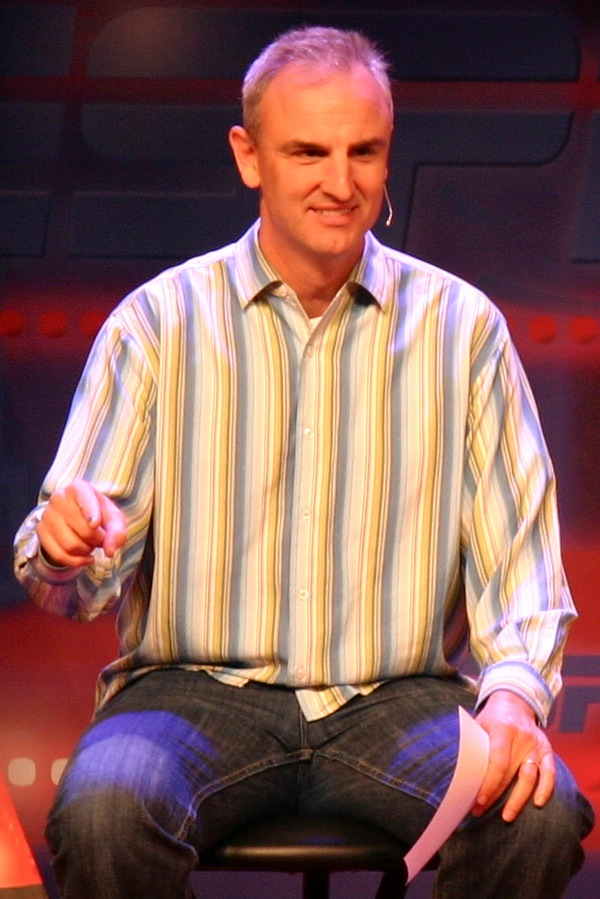
Trey Wingo
Co-host of ESPN's SportsCenter

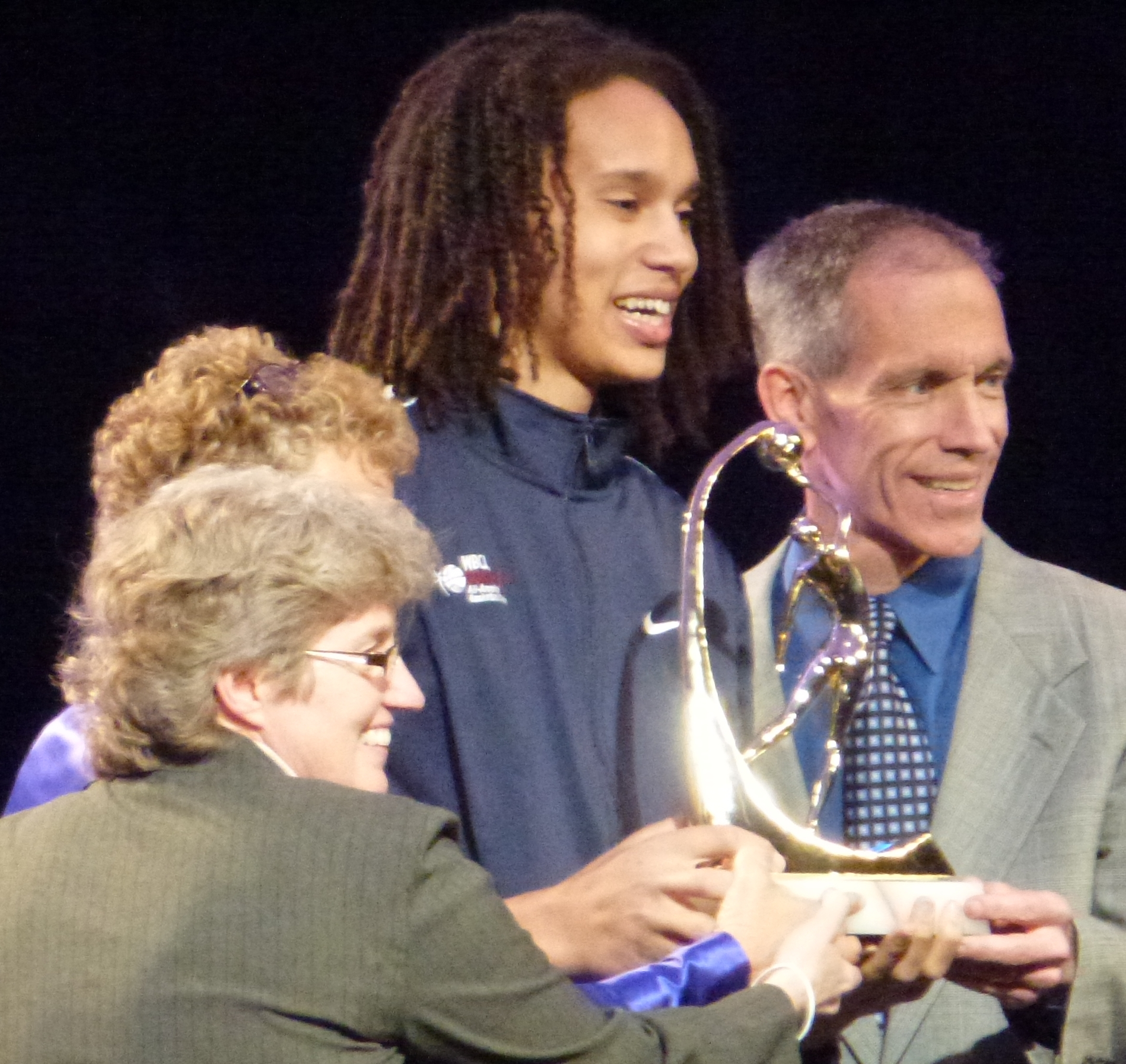
Brittney Griner
WNBA player for Phoenix Mercury, three-time All-American, 2012 AP Player of the Year

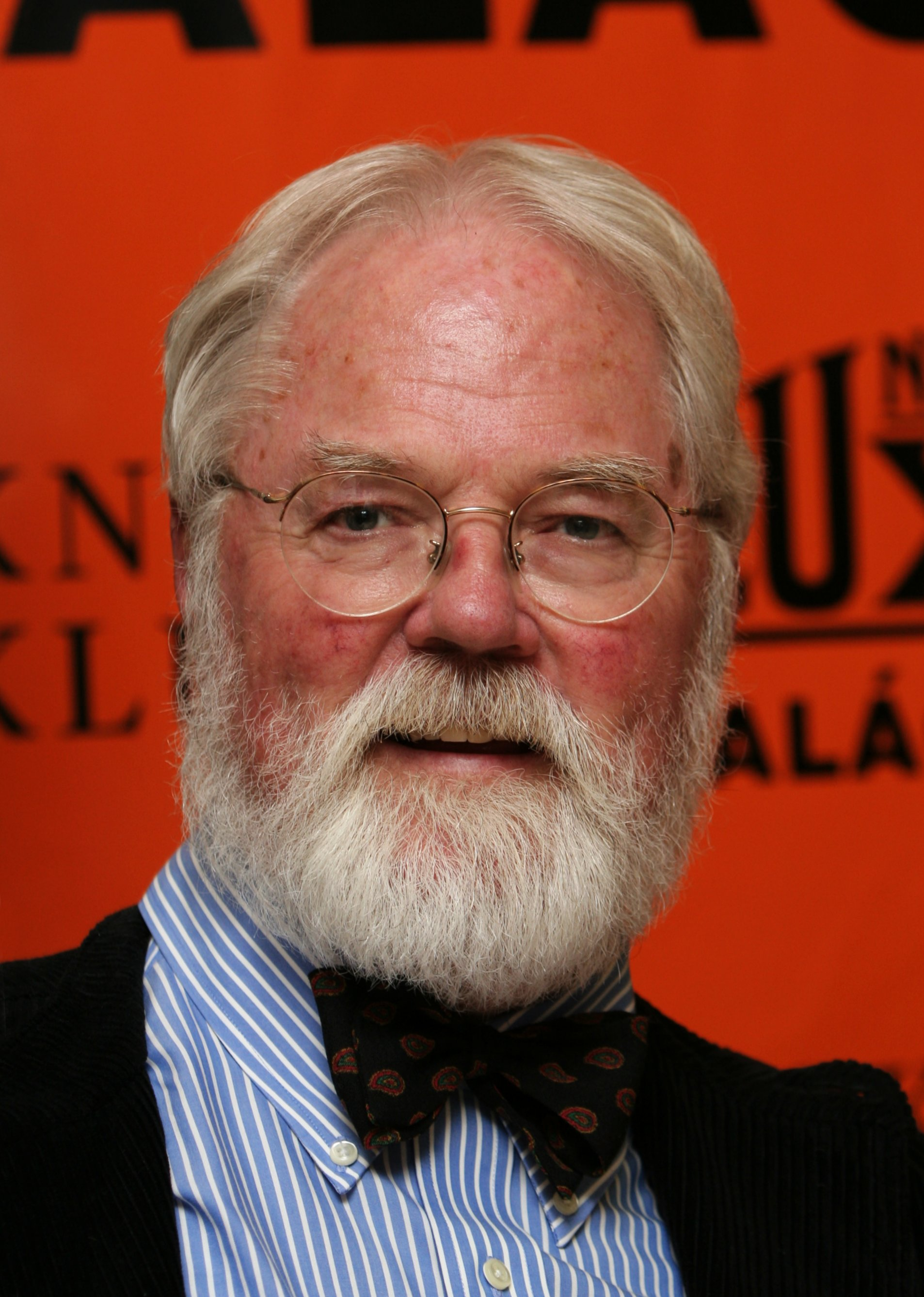
Robert Fulghum
Minister and New York Times Bestselling author

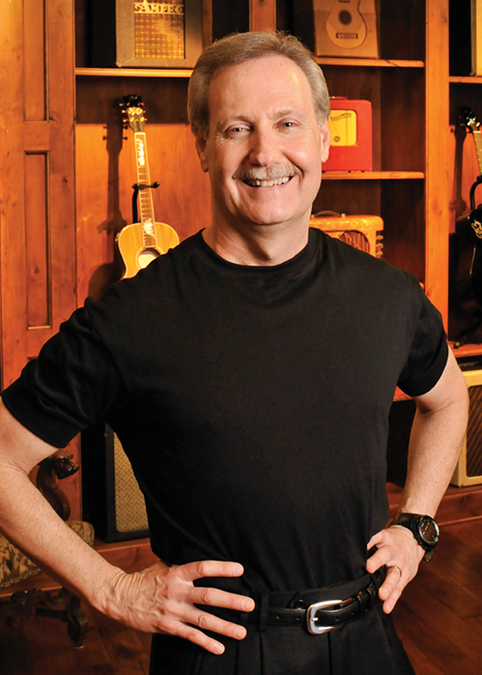
Gary W. Keller
Author and co-founder of Keller Williams Realty

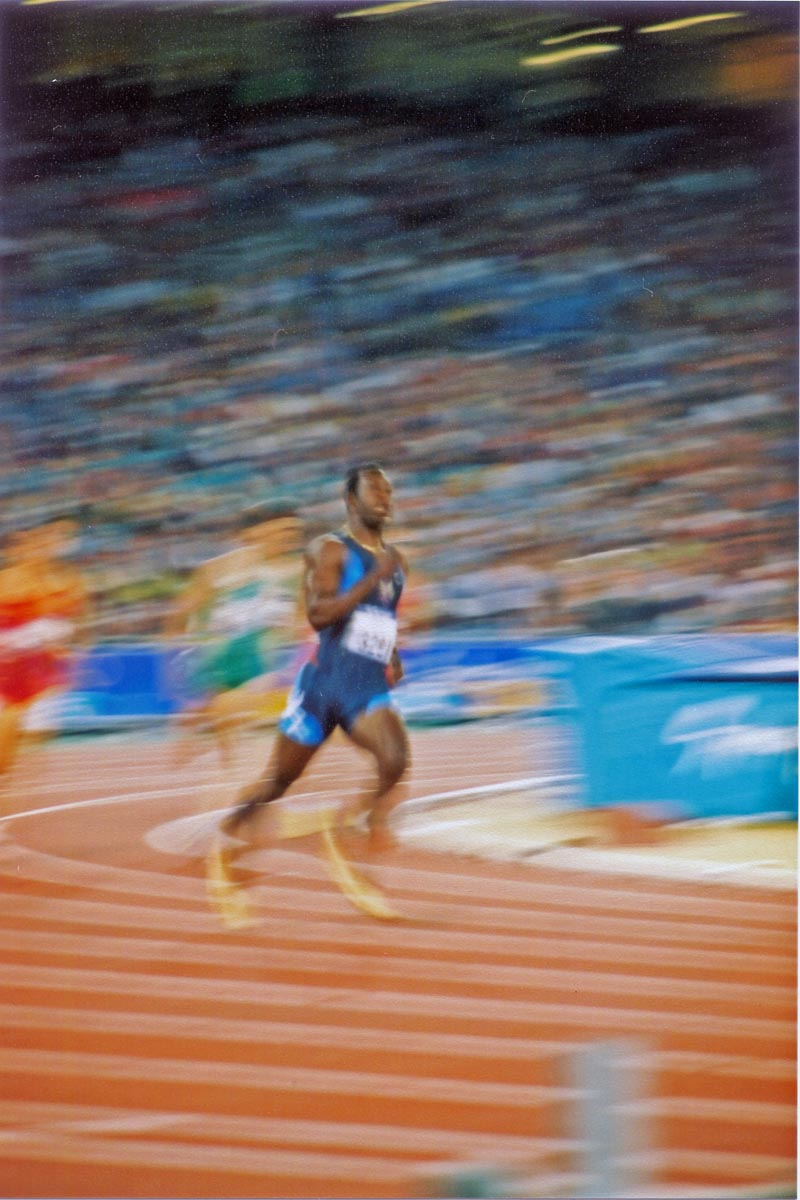
Michael Johnson
Sprinter, winner of four Olympic gold medals and eight World Championships gold medals

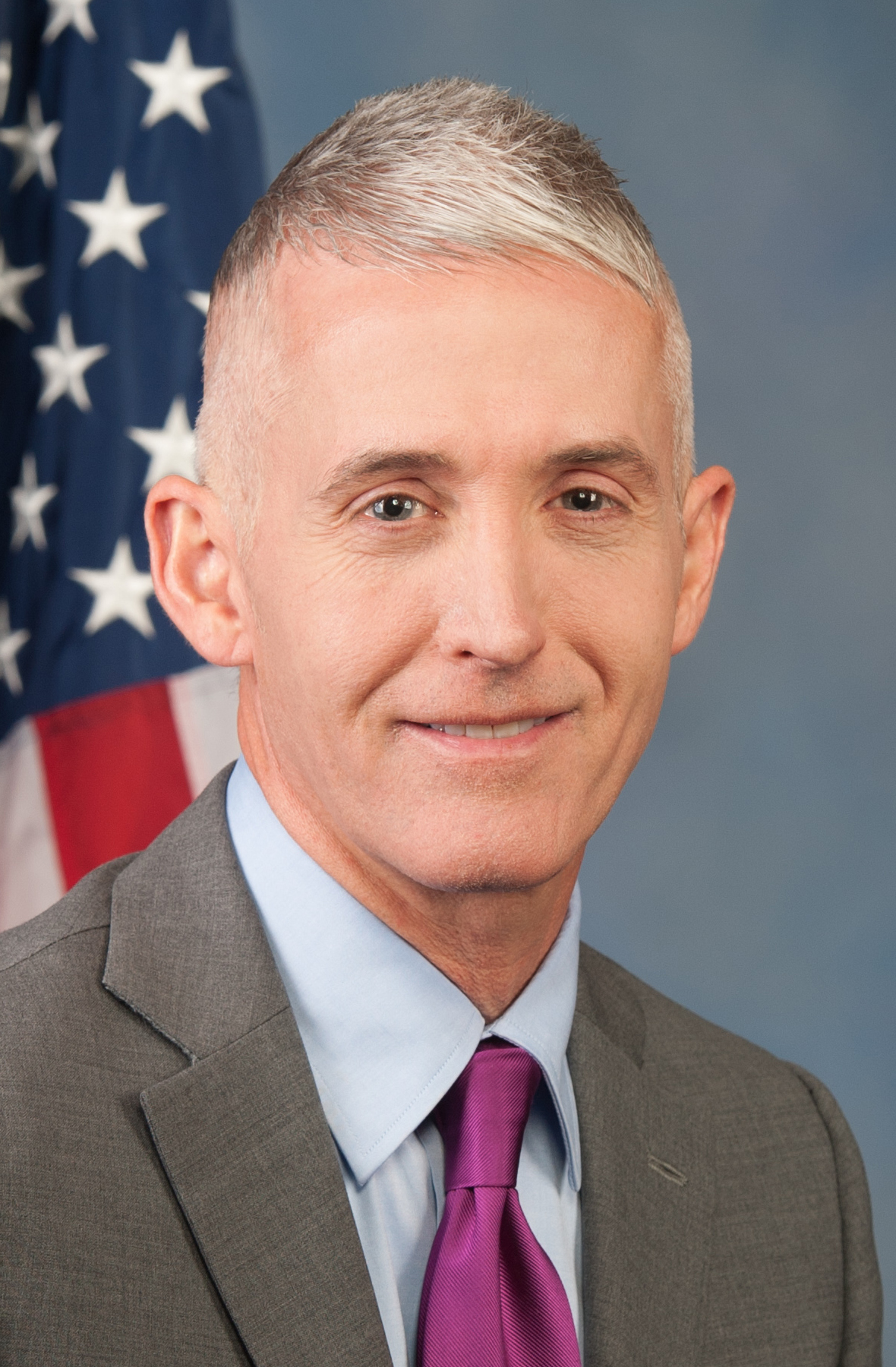
Trey Gowdy
Former US congressman and television news personality

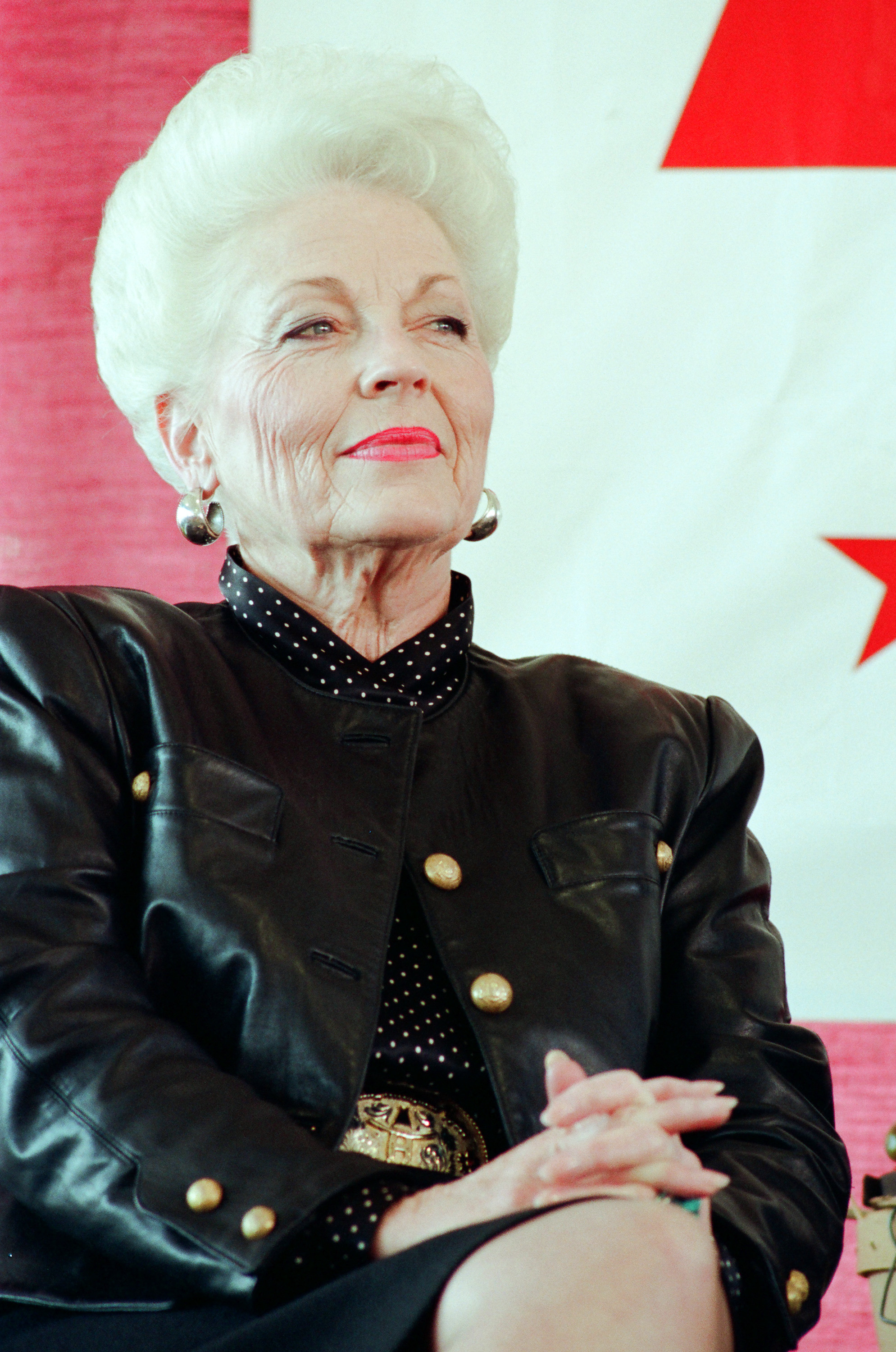
Ann Richards
Former governor of Texas

== Campus ==
Campus

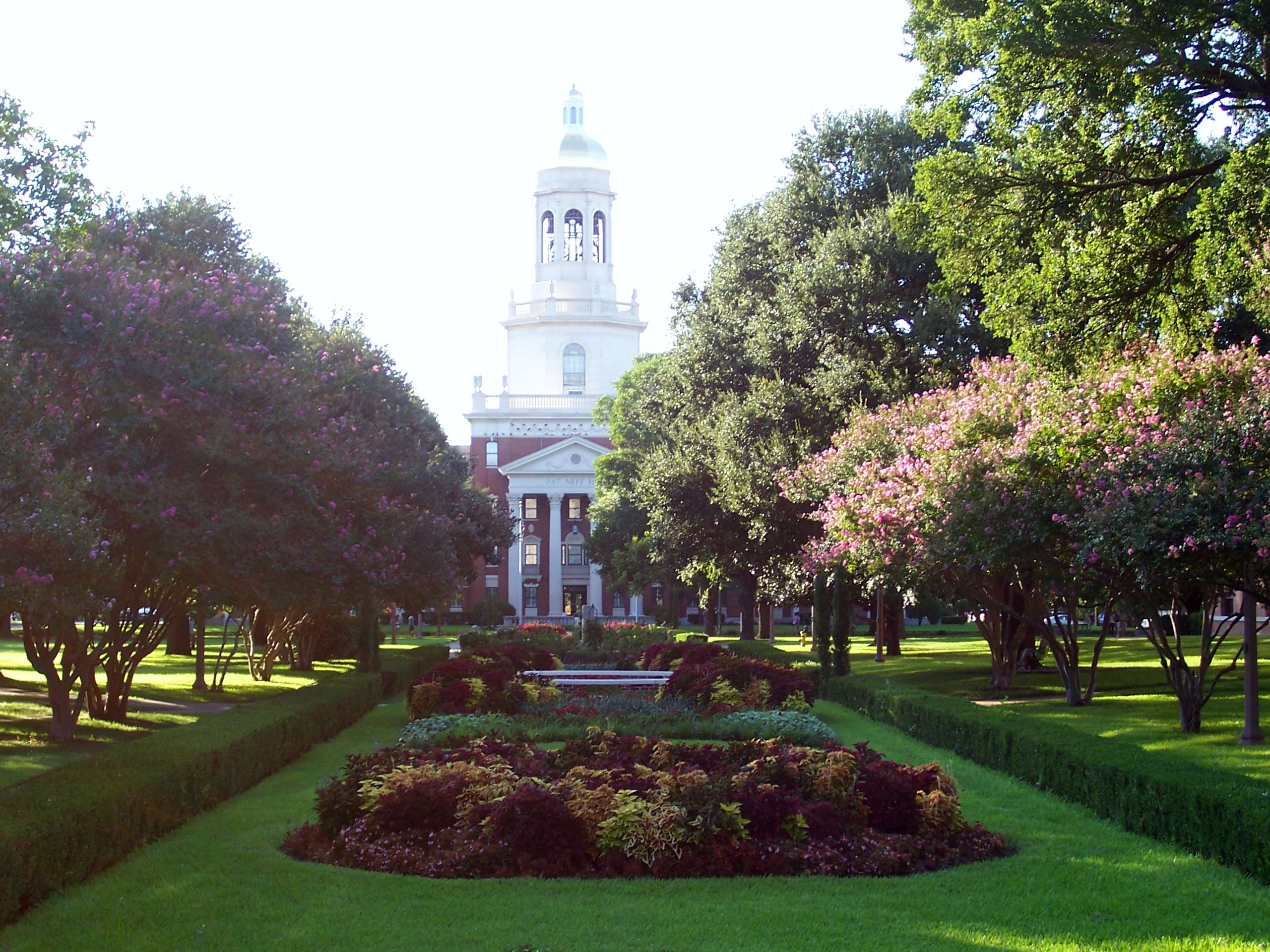
Pat Neff Hall, named for the former governor of Texas, Texas Railroad Commission member, and president of Baylor

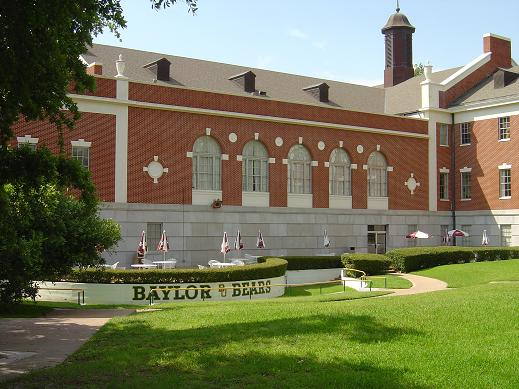
Bill Daniel Student Center from the side

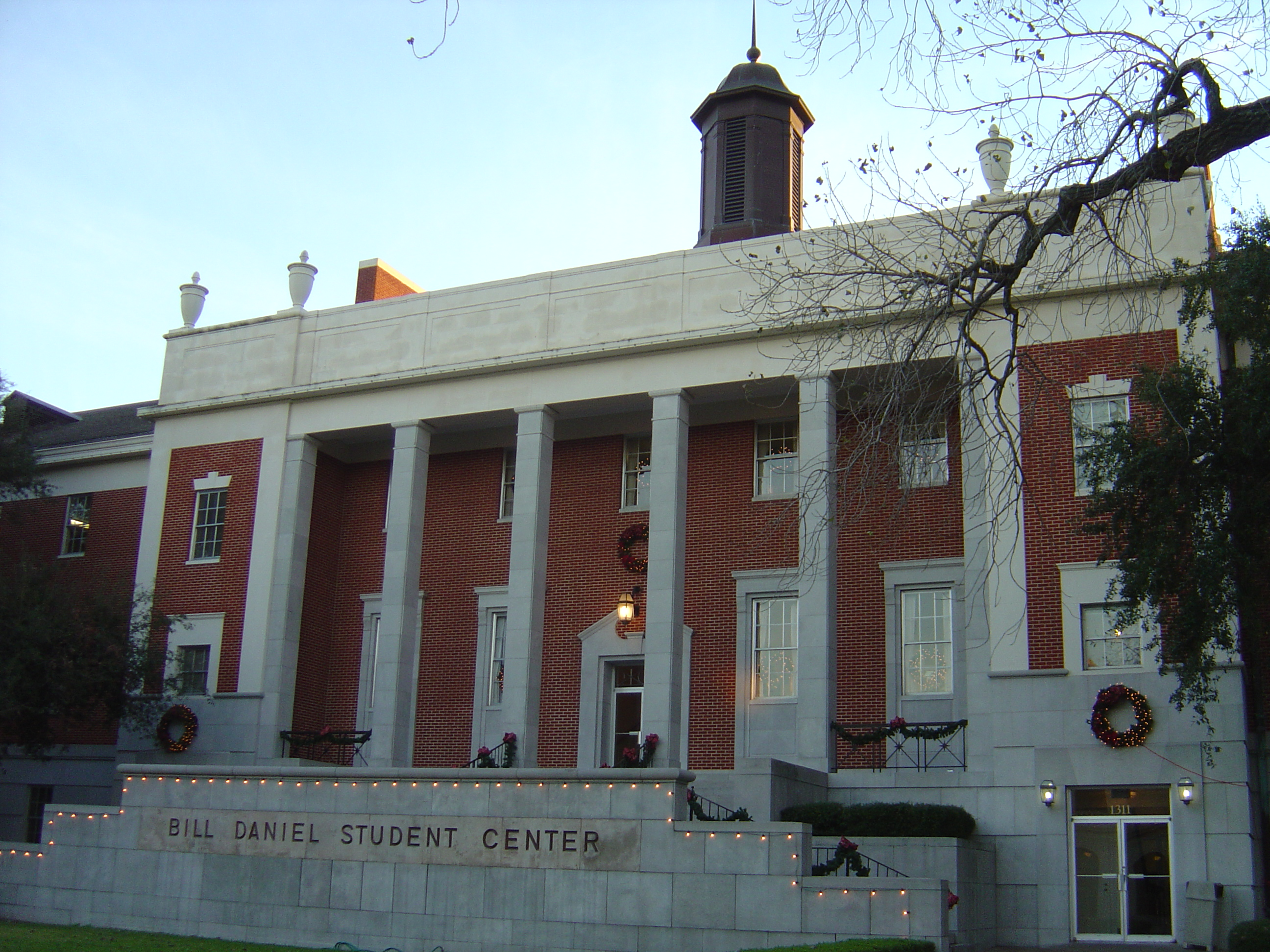
Bill Daniel Student Center during Christmas

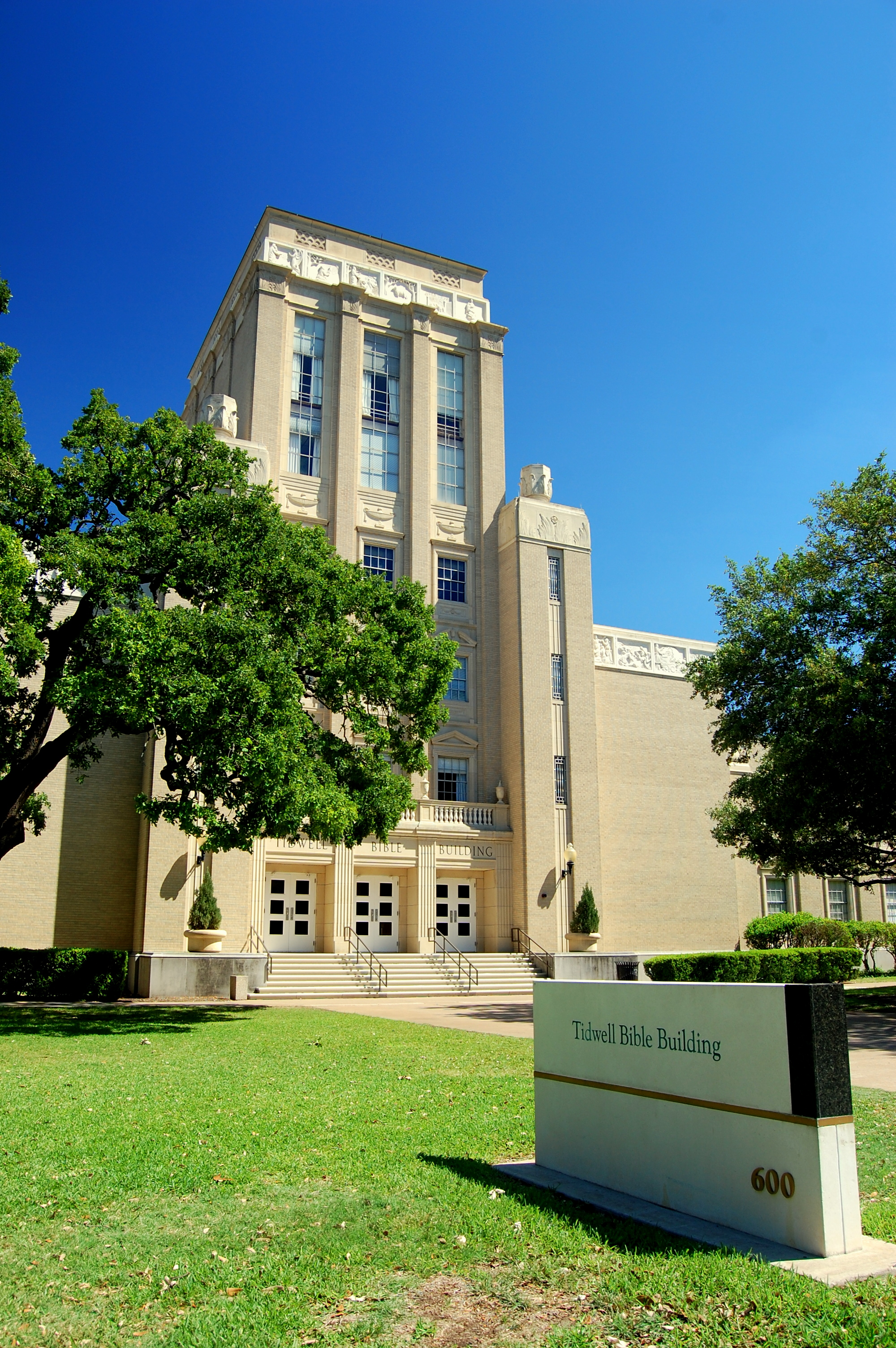
Tidwell Bible Building

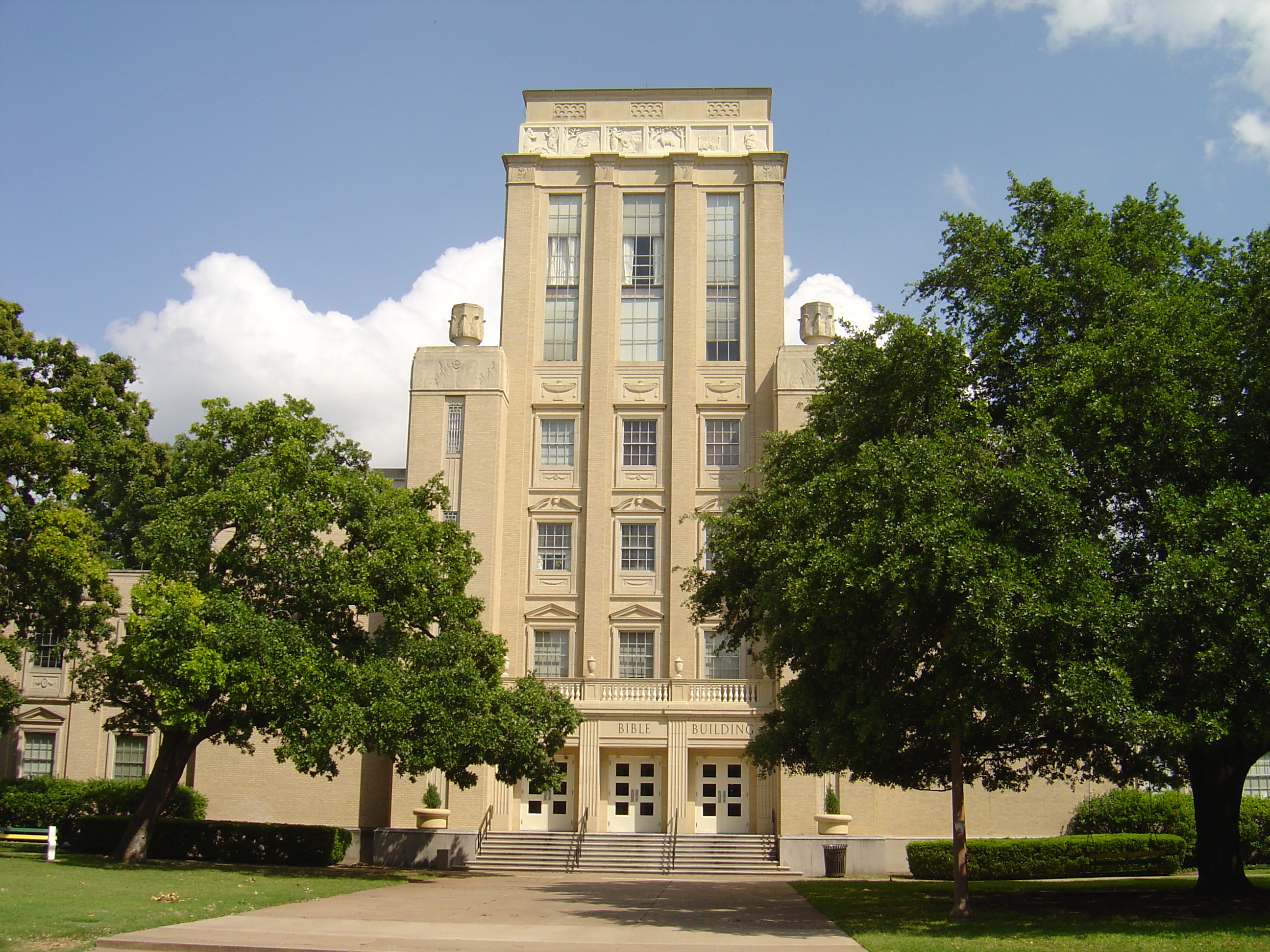
Tidwell Bible Building

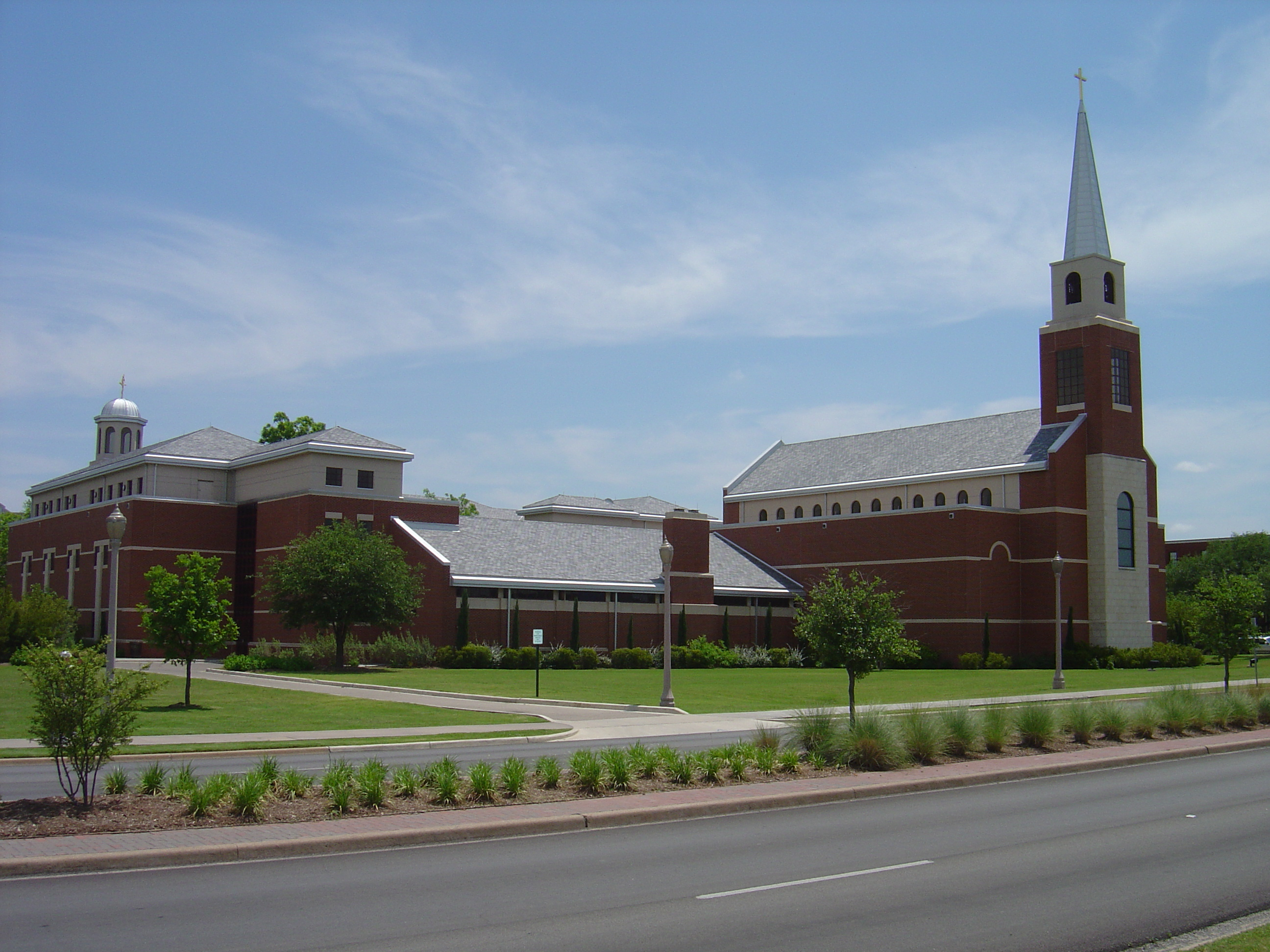
Truett Seminary

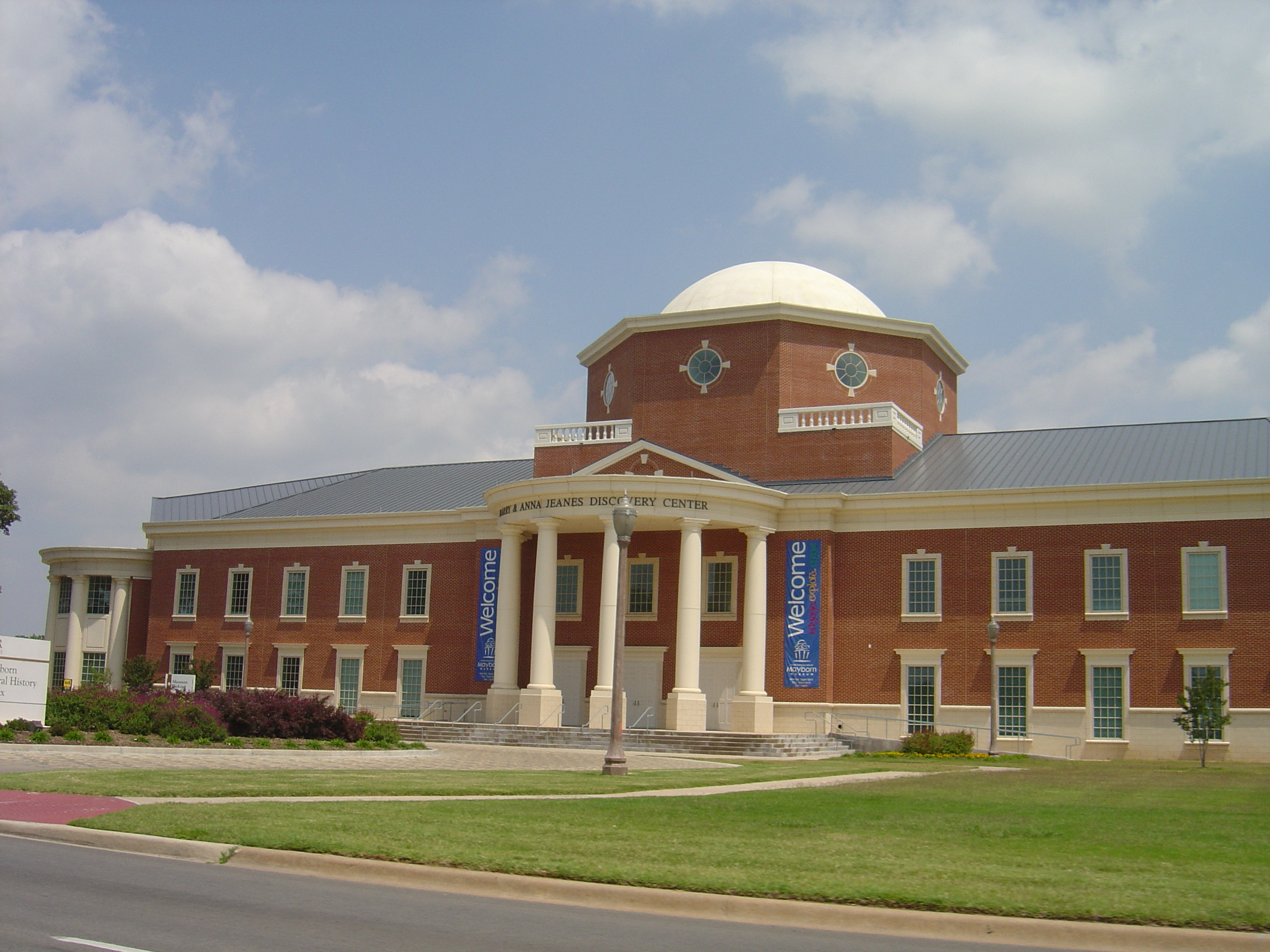
Mayborn Museum

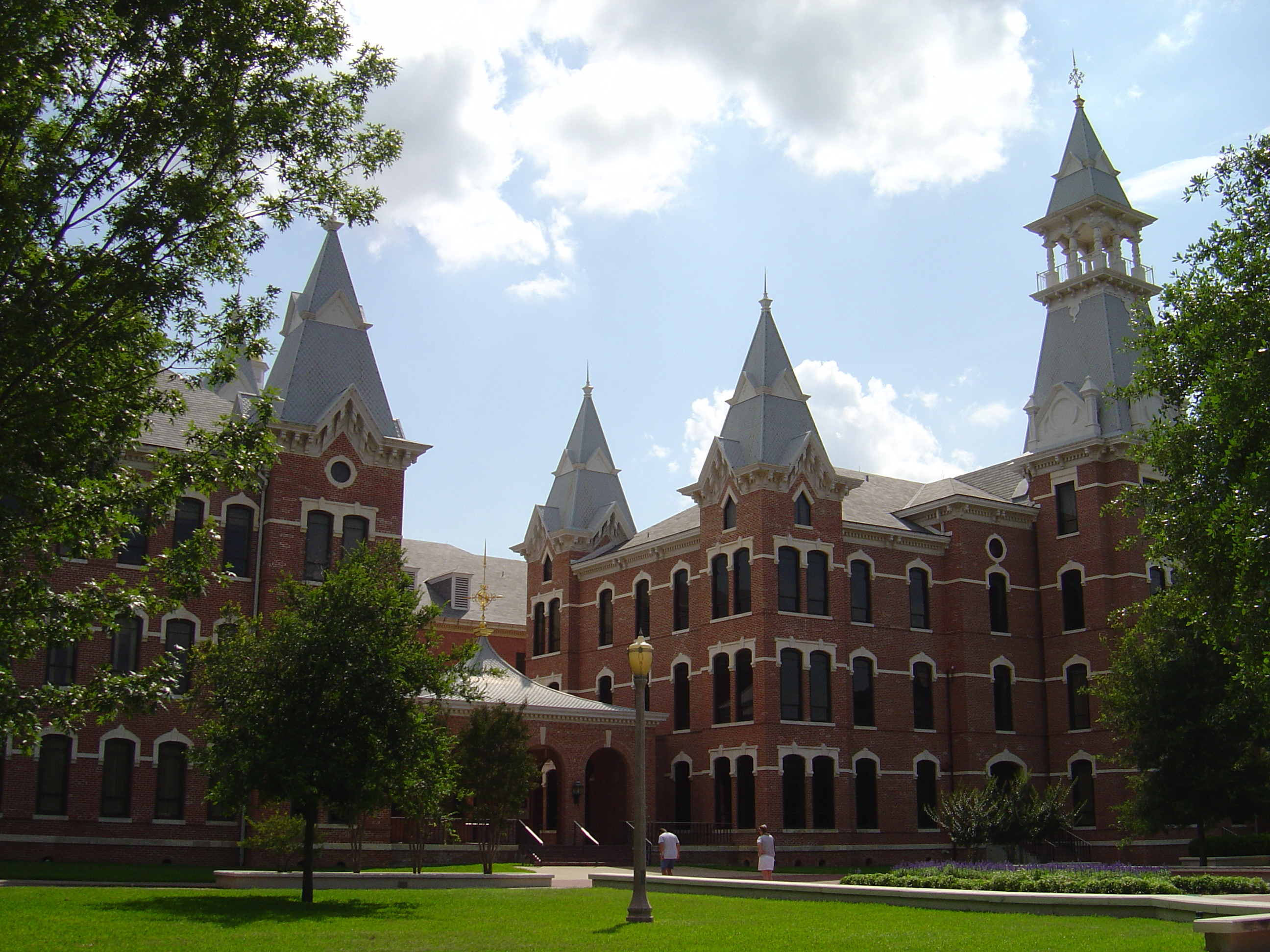
Burleson Quadrangle

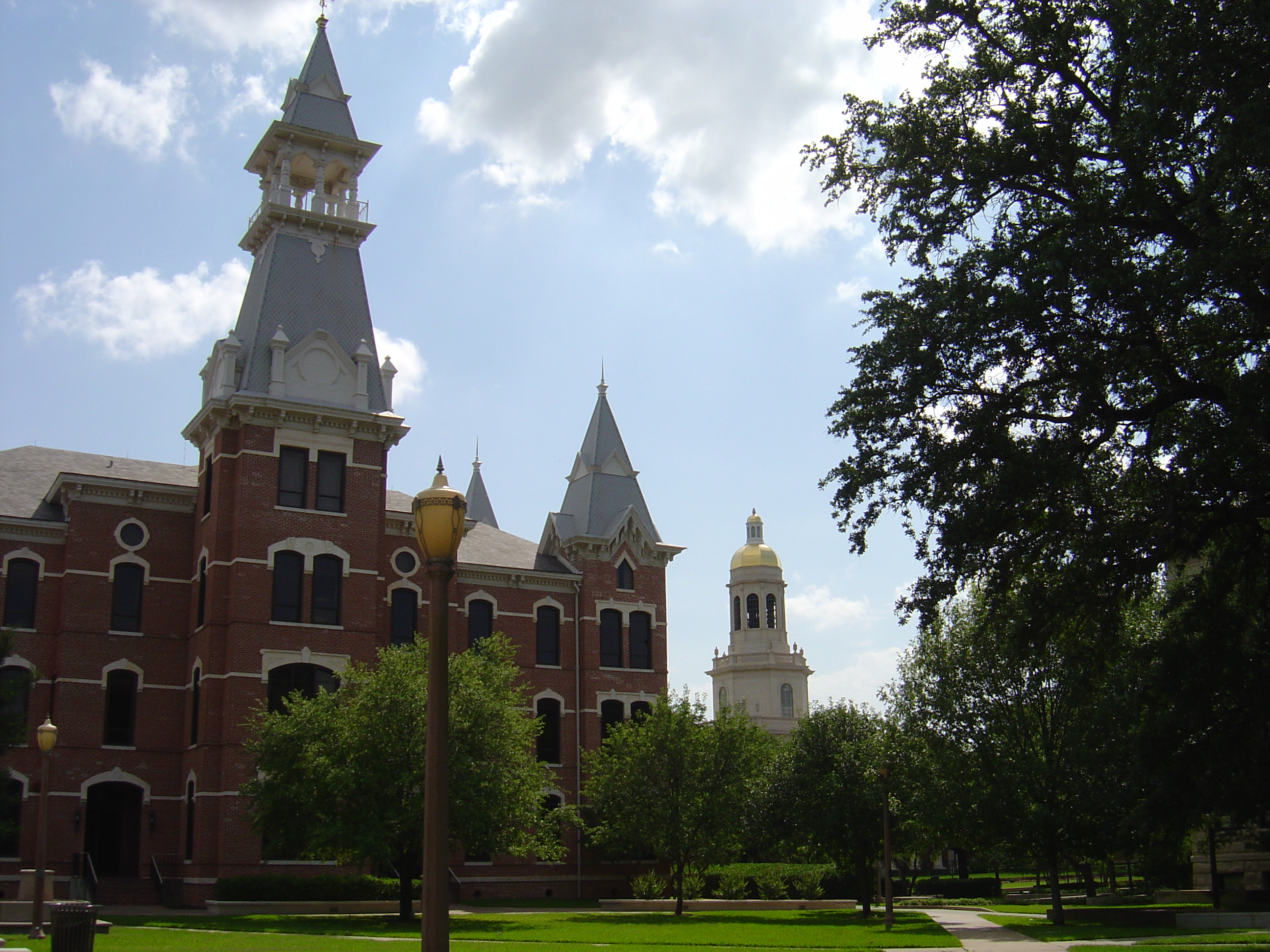
Old Main and Pat Neff Hall

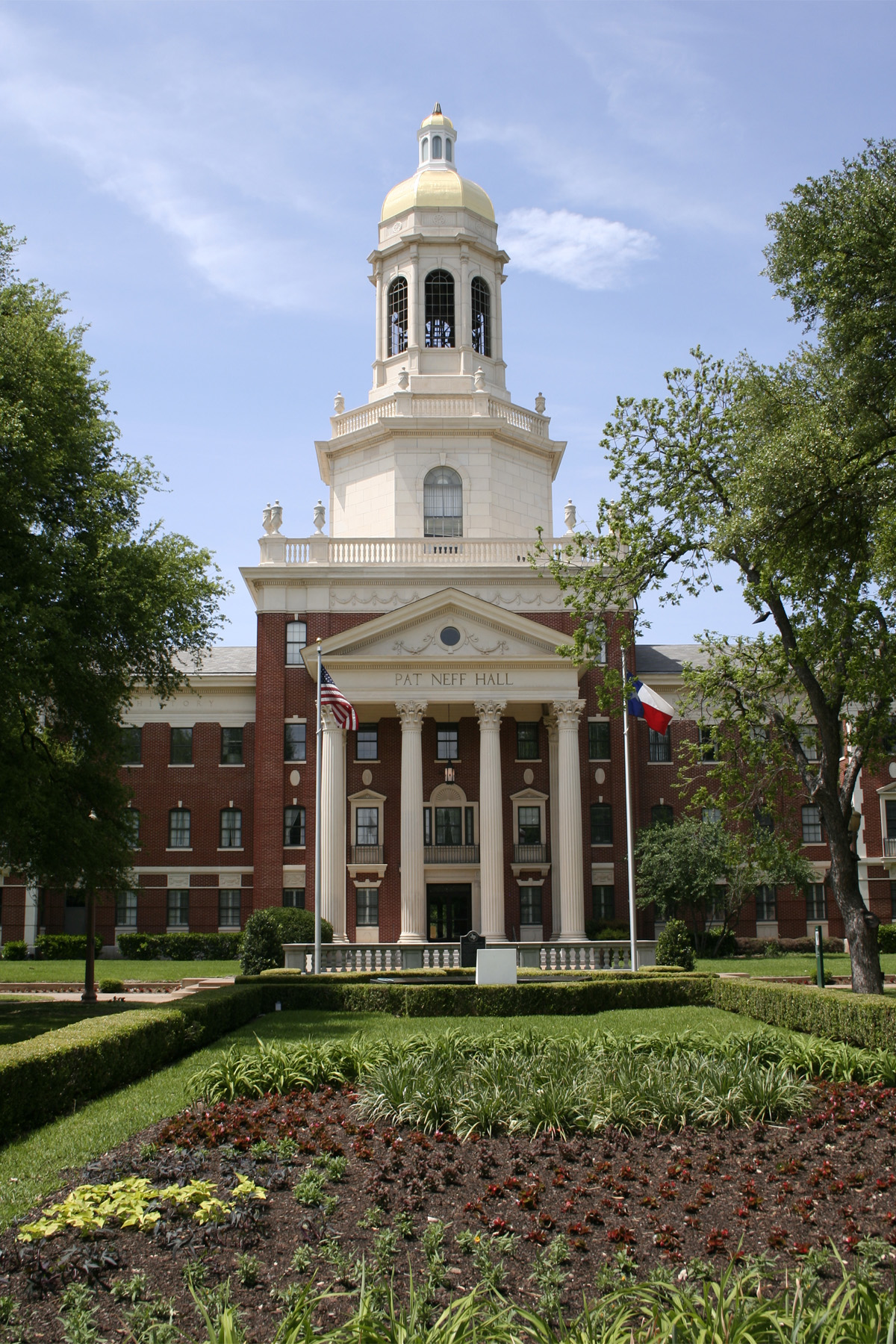
Pat Neff Hall looking west

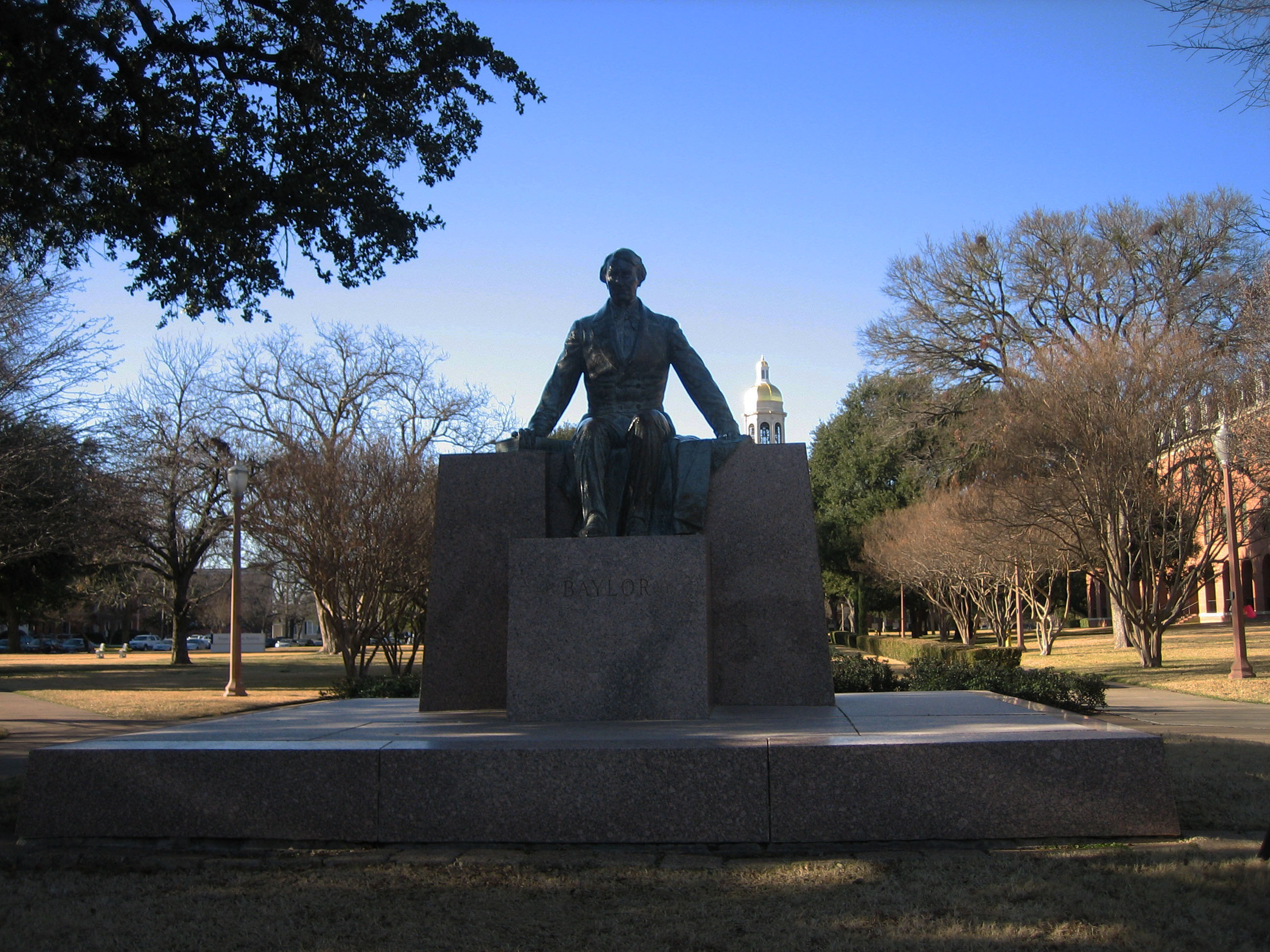
Statue of Judge Baylor

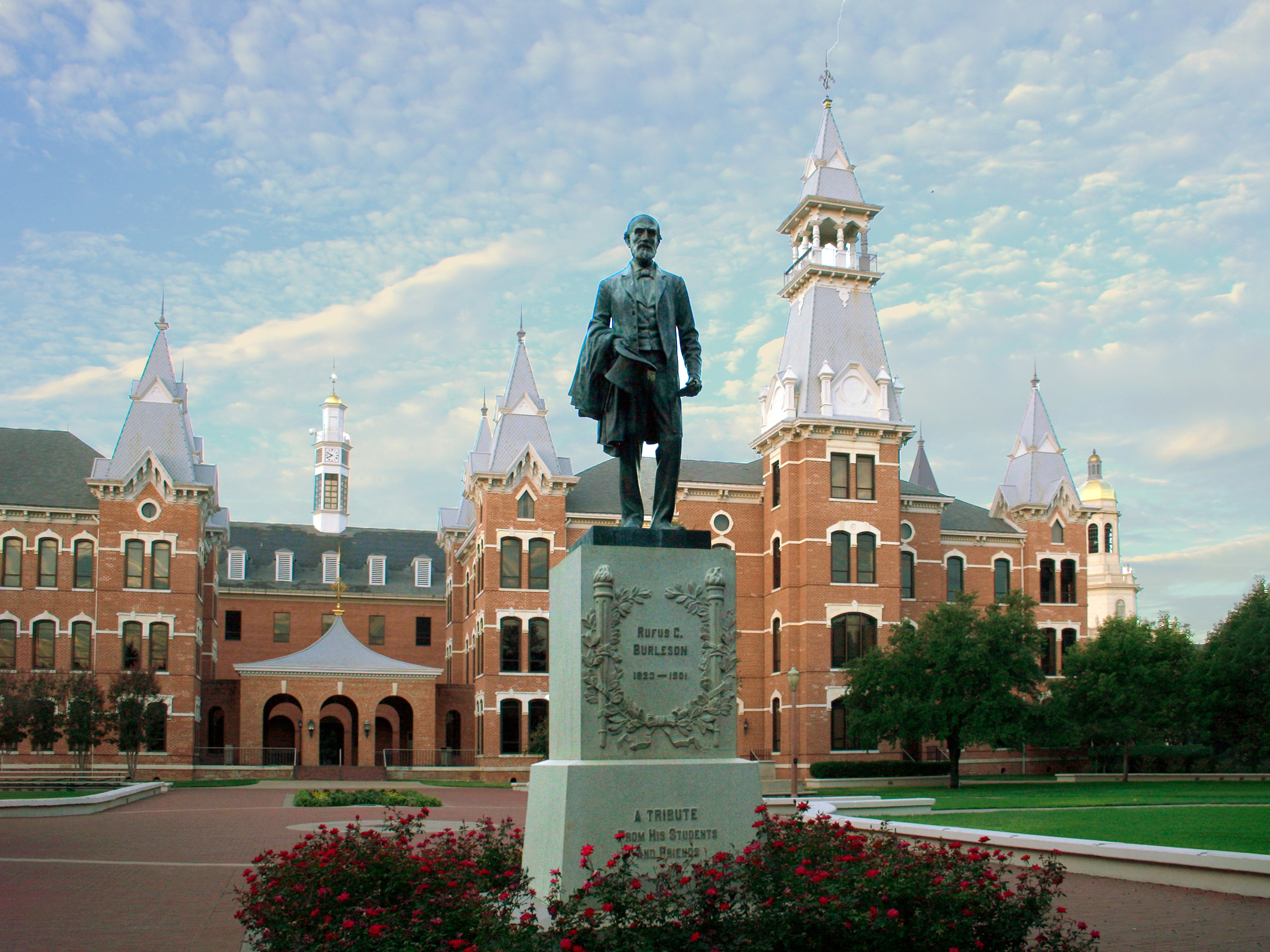
Another view of Burleson Quadrangle

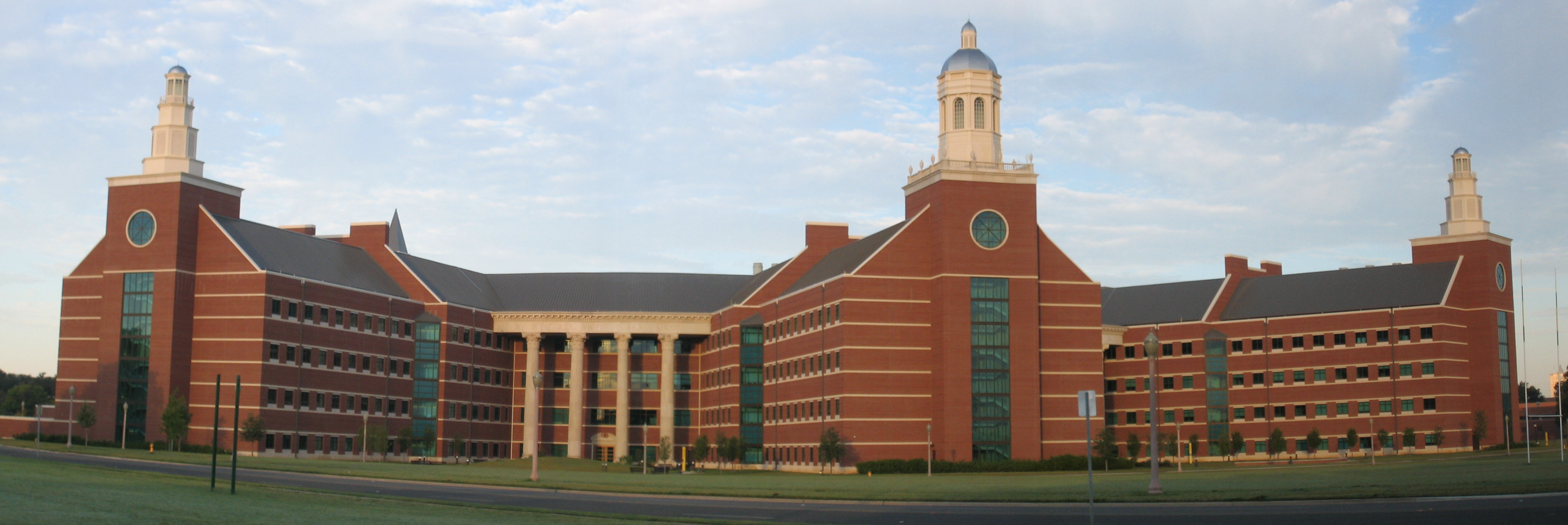
Baylor Science Building

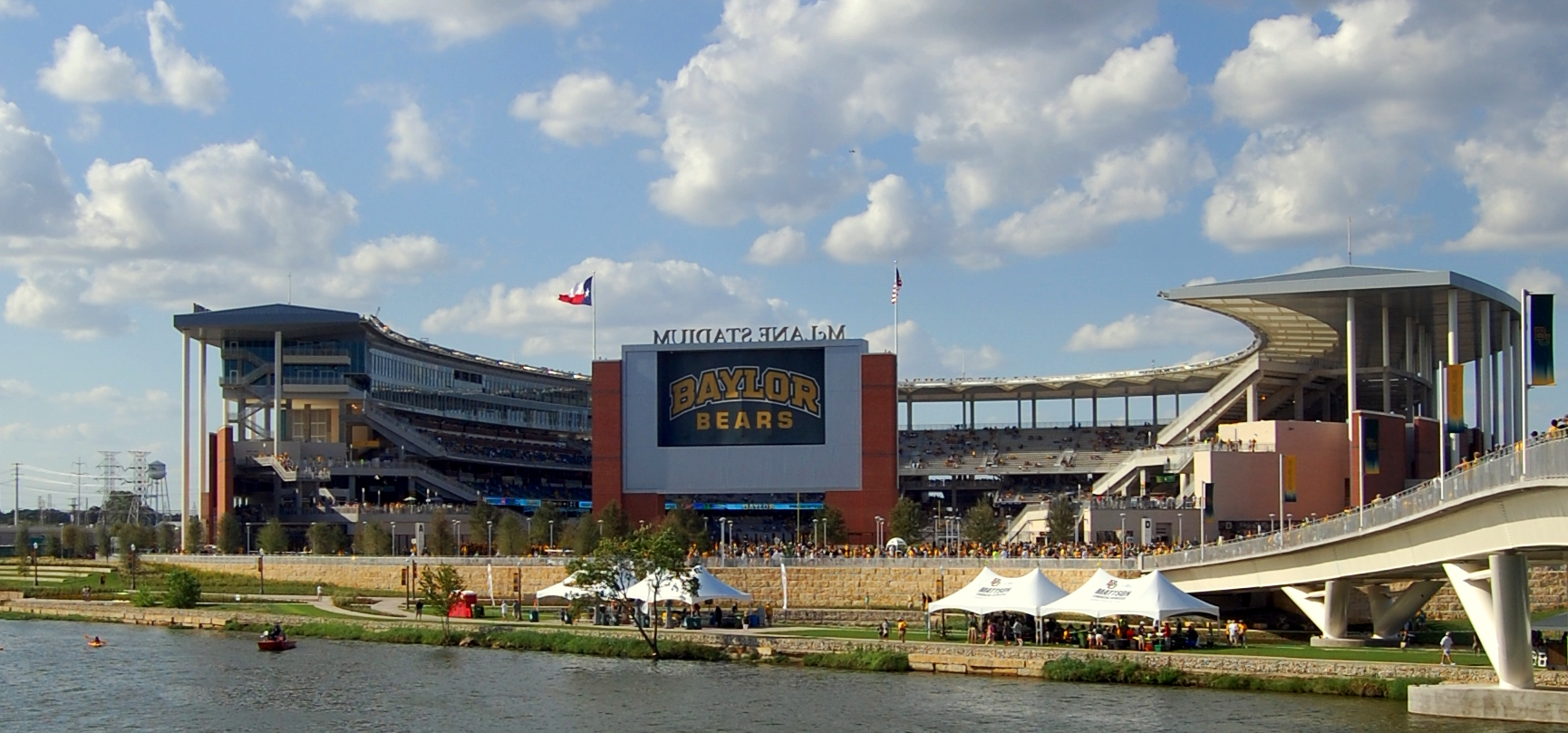
McLane Stadium

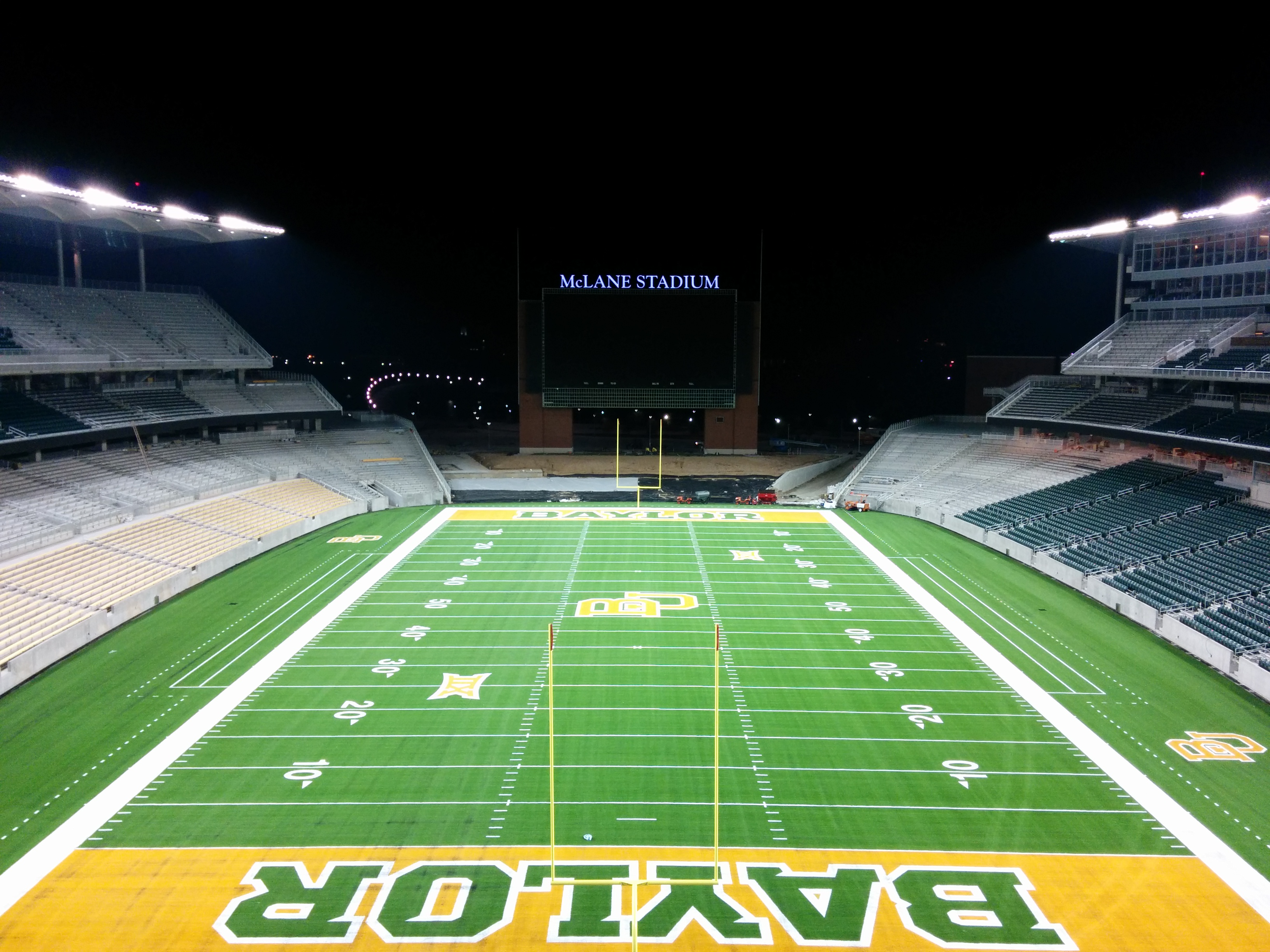
McLane Stadium interior facing south

== See also ==
- SS Baylor Victory – ship namesake
