= List of Baylor University people =

This is a list of notable people associated with Baylor University in Waco, Texas, United States. To be included in this list, a person must have their own, existing Wikipedia article. The list includes notable alumni, faculty, and former students.

== Alumni ==
=== Academics ===
- William Bennett Bizzell, former president of the University of Oklahoma and former president of Texas A&M University
- Barbara H. Bowman, geneticist and former professor at the University of Texas Medical Branch in Galveston and University of Texas Health Science Center
- Gilberto Freyre, Brazilian sociologist, cultural anthropologist and historian
- Edwin Gaustad, historian of religion in America
- Guy Benton Johnson, Sociologist and cultural anthropologist; distinguished student of black culture in the rural South and a pioneer advocate of racial equality
- Jo Jorgensen, Clemson University lecturer in psychology and Libertarian Party candidate for president in 2020, VP in 1996
- Glenn McGee, professor of medicine, philosophy, law and public health
- Judy Jolley Mohraz, 9th president of Goucher College, women's history professor, and philanthropist
- Royce Money, former president of Abilene Christian University
- Mark W. Muesse, philosopher and professor emeritus at Rhodes College
- Olin Clyde Robison, former president of Middlebury College
- Lawrence Sullivan Ross, former president of Texas A&M University and Governor of Texas
- Beck A. Taylor, president of Samford University
- Dixon Wecter (BA, 1925), Margaret Byrne Professor of United States History at the University of California, Berkeley
- Dallas Willard, philosopher and professor at the University of Southern California

=== The arts ===
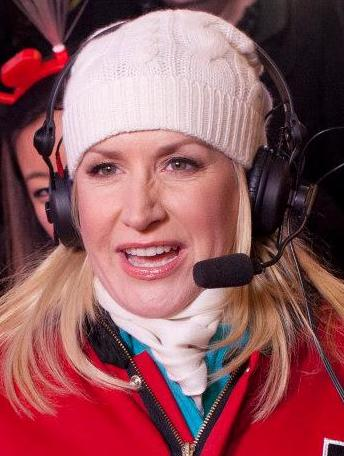
Angela Kinsey (BA, 1993), Emmy Award-winning actress

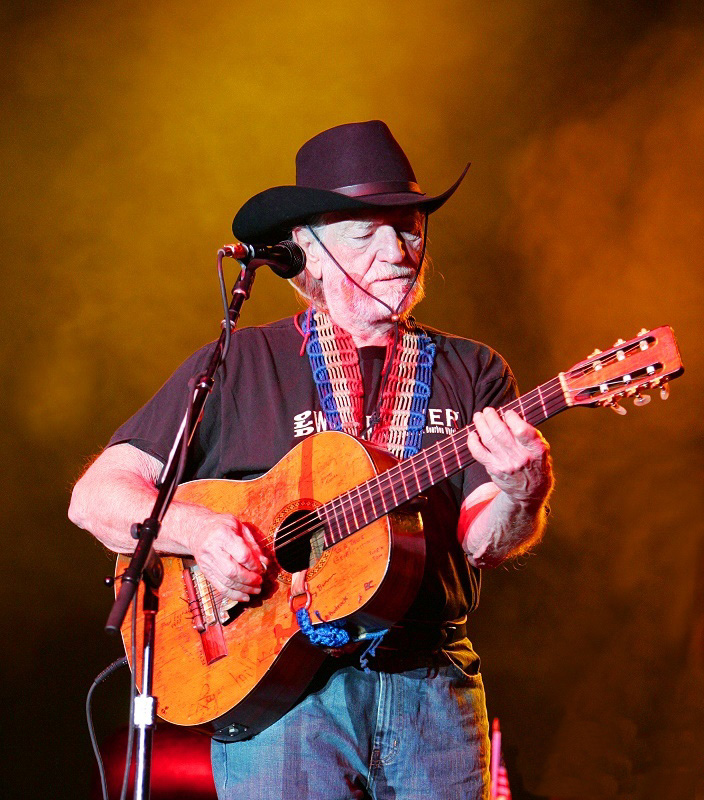
Willie Nelson, six-time Grammy Award-winning musician

- H. Parrott Bacot, art historian
- Nancy Barrett, actress, best known for her roles in the soap opera Dark Shadows
- Crystal Bernard, singer and actress who starred in the television series Wings
- Marc Burckhardt, artist and illustrator
- Carole Cook, actress, Broadway and film
- Elizabeth A. Davis, Tony Award-nominated actress
- Jim Dickinson, record producer, singer and pianist
- Phil Driscoll, Grammy-winning singer/trumpet player
- Rodger Dean Duncan, author and business consultant
- Jeff Dunham, ventriloquist and comedian
- Forrest Frank, singer, songwriter, and producer
- Robert Fulghum, best-selling author, philosopher
- Chip Gaines, television personality, entrepreneur, and author; television series Fixer Upper and Magnolia Market
- Joanna Gaines, television personality, entrepreneur, and author; television series Fixer Upper and Magnolia Market
- Florence Gerald (BA, 1880), writer, poet, stage actress
- Bruce Greer, composer
- Shaun Groves, Christian contemporary musician, singer, songwriter
- Derek Haas, author/screenwriter
- Jack Hamm, author of acclaimed art books, cartoonist
- John Lee Hancock, director of The Alamo; producer of My Dog Skip
- Robin Hardy, author of numerous books including The Annals of Lystra: Chataine's Guardian
- Thomas Harris, best-selling author of Silence of the Lambs
- Mark Hayes, Christian music vocal and instrumental arranger
- Jackson Hurst, actor, television series Drop Dead Diva and Walking Tall 3
- Brett James, country music singer and songwriter
- Julie Kenner, author and former lawyer
- Kara Killmer, actress, Chicago Fire
- Angela Kinsey (BA, 1993); actress, podcaster, and television panelist
- Clancy Martin, novelist and philosopher
- Erin McCarley, songwriter-musician
- Brooklyn and Bailey McKnight, actresses and YouTube personalities
- Austin Miller, actor, dancer, and singer on Grease: You're The One That I Want
- Jay Hunter Morris, operatic tenor
- Willie Nelson, country music star
- Eddie Noack, country music singer and songwriter
- Grady Nutt, pastor, humorist and television personality; regular on Hee Haw (1979–1983)
- David Phelps, tenor for the Gaither Vocal Band
- Derek Phillips, actor
- Alfred Reed, composer and conductor
- Kevin Reynolds, film director
- Maddy Rosenberg, artist
- Gretchen Rossi, TV personality, The Real Housewives of Orange County
- Paul Smith, singer/songwriter, member of The Imperials
- Suzy Spencer, true-crime writer and novelist
- Robert Sterling, songwriter, produce, arranger
- Steven Stucky, Pulitzer Prize winner for music
- David Sullivan, film and television actor
- Allison Tolman, actress
- Jennifer Vasquez, actress and contestant on season six of Big Brother
- Peter Weber, television personality, pilot, and author; television series The Bachelor and The Bachelorette
- Allen Wier, writer
- Noble Willingham, television and film actor
- Roxanne Wilson, finalist on season five of The Apprentice
- Stephanie Young, voice actress, singer, songwriter
- Man-Ching Donald Yu, composer

=== Business ===
- Joe Allbritton, founder and owner of Allbritton Communications Company, the parent company of Politico
- Paul L. Foster, chairman of the board of Western Refining
- Thomas W. Horton, lead director of General Electric's board of directors
- Mark Hurd, CEO and board of directors member of Oracle Corporation
- Michael S. Hyatt, former CEO of Thomas Nelson Publishers, New York Times best-selling author, and founder of Michael Hyatt & Company, an Inc. 5000 fastest growing company for 2017, 2018, and 2019
- Gary Keller, co-founder and chairman of Keller Williams Realty International
- Rebecca Mark, former head of Enron International
- Drayton McLane, chairman of the McLane Group and former owner of the Houston Astros
- Bob J. Perry, founder of Perry Homes
- Marjorie Scardino, CEO of Pearson, a major media group; former CEO of the Economist Group; also a non-executive director of Nokia Corporation
- Bob R. Simpson, co-founder, chairman, and CEO of XTO Energy and co-owner of the Texas Rangers
- Allen Stanford, former chairman of Stanford Financial Group, which operated as a Ponzi scheme, convicted financial fraudster
- A. Latham Staples, president and CEO of EXUSMED, Inc.; chairman of Empowering Spirits Foundation
- Bill Townsend, Internet entrepreneur and founder of the Web search engine Lycos, Inc.

=== Law ===
- Charles Barrow, former justice in the Texas Supreme Court and a dean of Baylor Law School
- Leonard E. Davis, United States district judge for the Eastern District of Texas
- Jennifer Walker Elrod, judge, United States Court of Appeals for the Fifth Circuit
- Sidney A. Fitzwater, chief United States federal district judge for the Northern District of Texas
- A. J. Folley, justice of the Texas Supreme Court
- James Rodney Gilstrap, United States District Judge for the Eastern District of Texas
- James E. Kinkeade, United States federal judge for Northern District of Texas
- Priscilla Owen, judge, United States Court of Appeals for the Fifth circuit, possible nominee to Supreme Court
- Ryan Patrick, former judge, 177th District Court, former United States attorney for the Southern District of Texas
- Thomas R. Phillips, former chief justice of the Texas Supreme Court
- Tom Price (JD), judge of the Texas Court of Criminal Appeals, 1997–2015; judge of the Texas 282nd Court, 1987–1997
- Walter Scott Smith Jr., chief United States federal judge for the Western District of Texas
- William Steger, long-serving United States federal judge for the Eastern District of Texas, ran unsuccessfully for Texas governor in 1960 and United States House of Representatives in 1962
- T. John Ward, former United States federal judge for the Eastern District of Texas
- Don Willett, United States circuit judge of the United States Court of Appeals for the Fifth Circuit

=== Media ===
- Richelle Carey, Al Jazeera America news anchor
- Deb Carson, Fox Sports Radio national sports anchor & co-host
- Beth Haller, journalism professor, Fulbright scholar
- Robert Heard, reporter and journalist for the Associated Press
- Brooklyn McKnight and Bailey McKnight-Howard, YouTubers
- Candice Millard, former National Geographic editor and New York Times best selling author
- Trey Wingo, co-host of ESPN's SportsCenter

=== Military ===
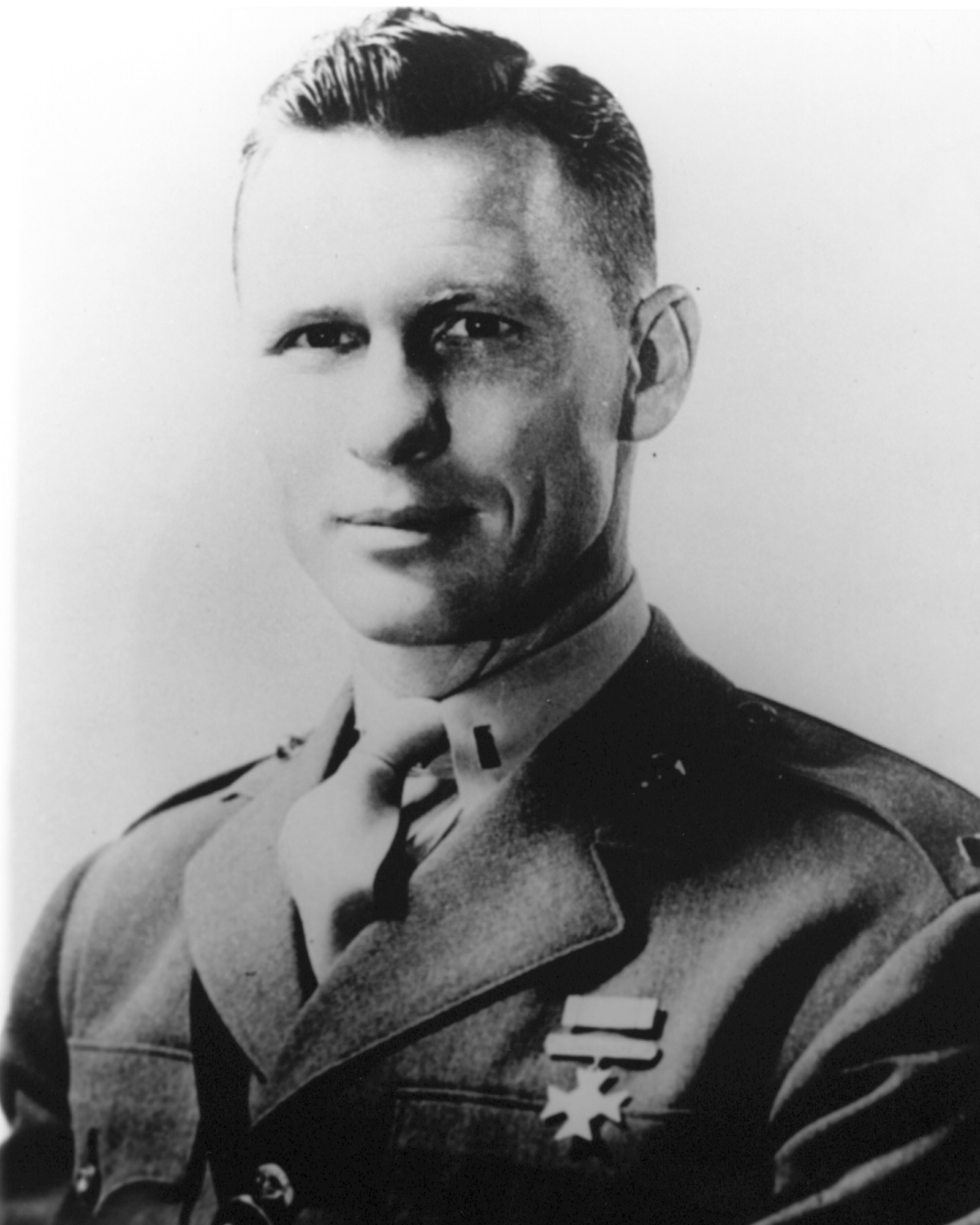
First Lieutenant Jack Lummus, Marine Corps Medal of Honor recipient

- Clarence R. Autery (BA and LL B, 1957), Air Force general
- O. L. Bodenhamer (BA, 1914; LL D (hon), 1930); Army officer during World War I, 12th national commander of American Legion 1929–1930
- John R. Kane (BA, 1928); Army Air Forces Medal of Honor recipient, led bombardment aircraft in mass low-level attack against Ploesti oil refineries in 1943
- Jack Lummus; professional football player with the New York Giants, Marine Corps Medal of Honor recipient killed in action at the Battle of Iwo Jima in 1945
- Charles C. Pixley (MS), 34th surgeon general of the Army 1977–1981
- Gale Pollock (MHA, 1987), deputy surgeon general of the Army 2006–2007

=== Politics ===
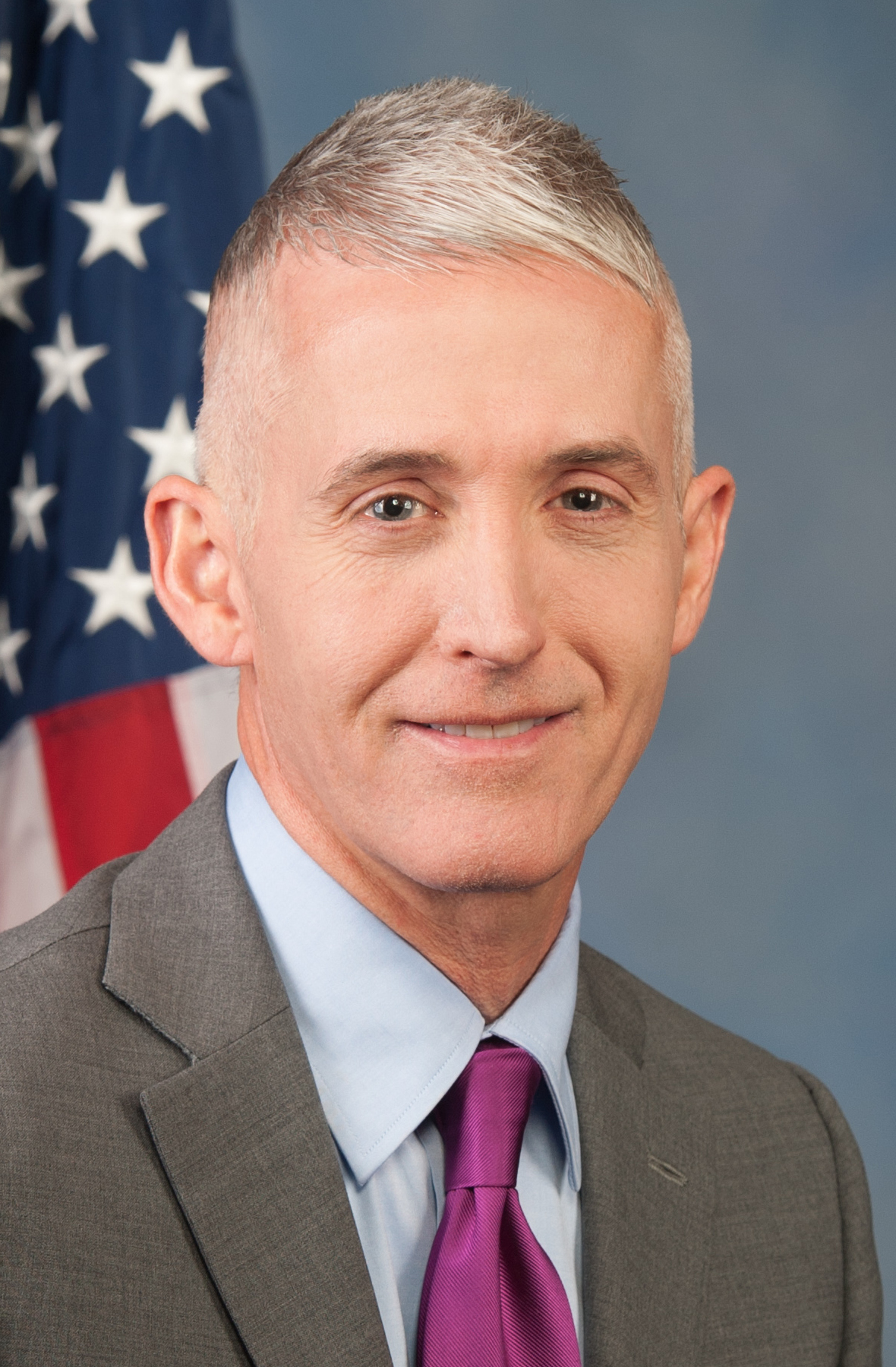
Trey Gowdy (BA, 1986), former U.S. representative from South Carolina and television news personality

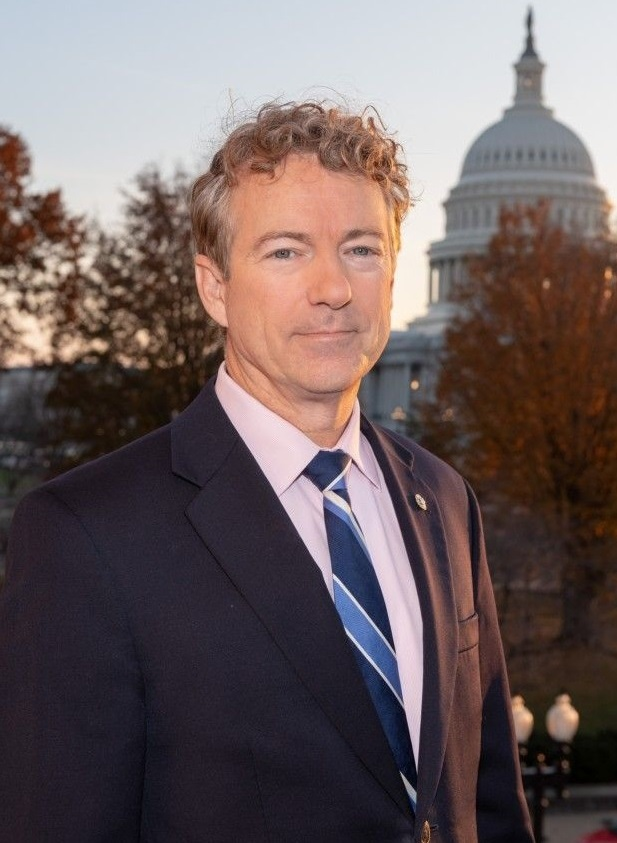
U.S. Senator Rand Paul (Kentucky)

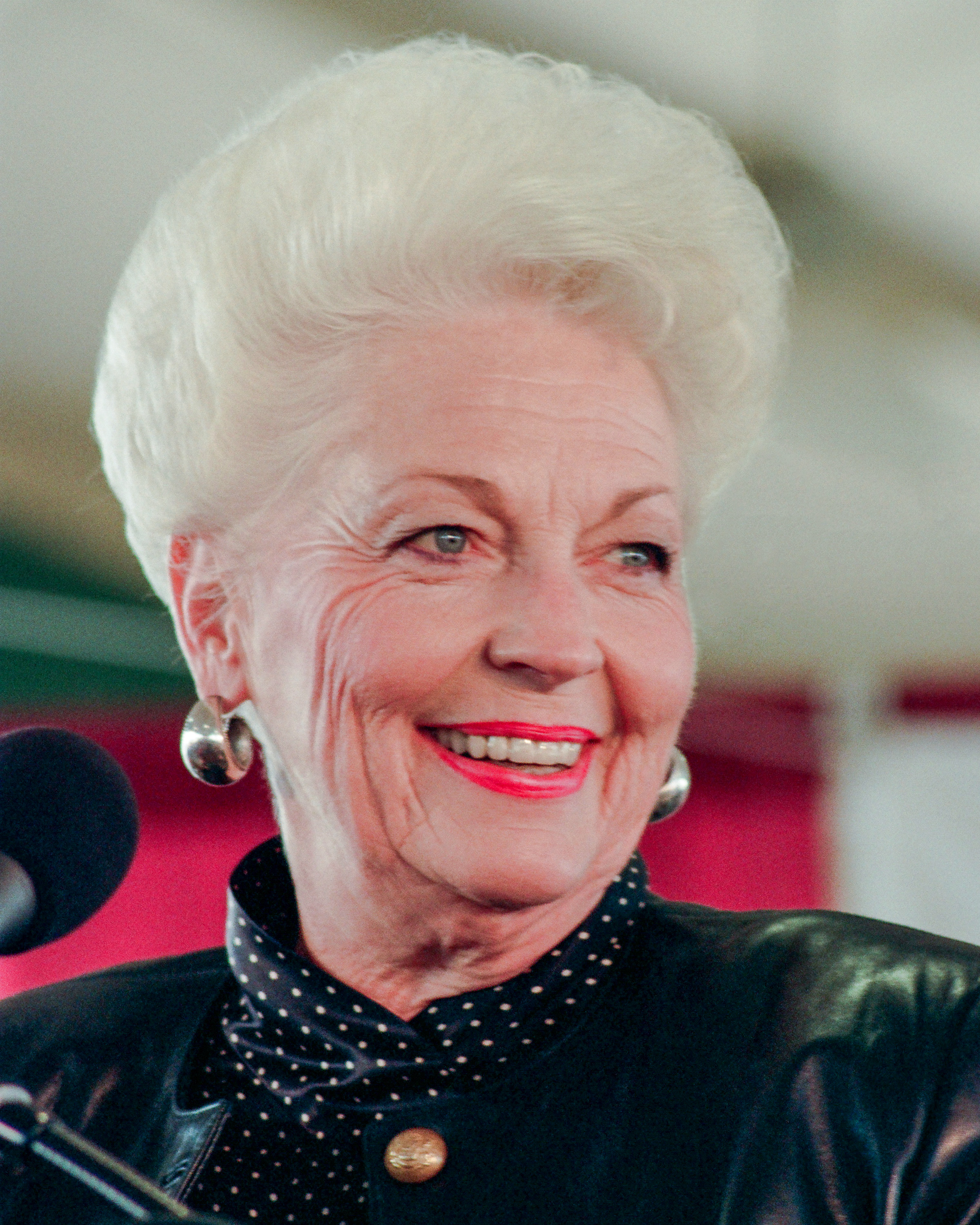
Ann Richards (BA, 1954), 45th governor of Texas

- James B. Adams, Texas legislator, former director of the Federal Bureau of Investigation
- Colin Allred, U.S. representative from Texas's 32nd congressional district (2019–present)
- Kip Averitt, former Texas state senator
- Charlotte Beers, businesswoman and former U.S. under secretary of state (2001–2003) (attended; did not graduate)
- Nick Begich III, U.S Representative from Alaska's At Large Congressional District (2025-Present)
- Charles T. Bernard, Arkansas Republican state chairman, 1971–1973; Republican candidate for United States Senate in 1968; farmer and businessman
- Bob Bullock, lieutenant governor of Texas, Texas comptroller of Public Accounts, Texas secretary of state, Texas state representative
- Joseph Cao, U.S. representative from Louisiana's 2nd congressional district (2009–2011), first Vietnamese-American to serve in Congress
- Brad Carson, U.S. representative from Oklahoma's 2nd congressional district (2001–2005)
- Sam Houston Clinton, former Texas Court of Criminal Appeals judge; lawyer who represented both atheist leader Madalyn Murray O'Hair and Jack Ruby, the man who shot and killed presidential assassin Lee Harvey Oswald
- Tom Connally, U.S. senator from Texas (1929–1953)
- David Craighead, former Oklahoman representative
- Bill Daniel, former governor of Guam and Democratic member of the Texas House of Representatives
- Price Daniel, governor of Texas 1957–1963
- Price Daniel Jr., speaker of the Texas House of Representatives (1973–1975)
- John E. Davis (BBA, 1982), Republican member of the Texas House of Representatives from Houston since 1999
- Craig Eiland, departing state representative and former speaker pro tempore of the Texas House of Representatives
- James Walter Elder, U.S. representative from Louisiana's 5th congressional district (1913–1915)
- Louie Gohmert, U.S. representative from Texas's 1st congressional district
- Trey Gowdy, U.S. representative from South Carolina's 4th congressional district
- Philip Gunn (BBA, 1985), speaker of the House Mississippi (current), first Republican speaker of the House in 136 years
- Sam B. Hall, U.S. representative from Texas's 1st congressional district (1976–1985)
- Kelly Hancock, Republican Texas state senator for District 9
- Phil Hardberger, former mayor of San Antonio
- Temple Lea Houston, son of Sam Houston, district attorney, and state legislator
- Andrew J. Houston, U.S. senator from Texas (1941); perennial candidate, and son of Texas statesman Sam Houston
- Ernest Istook, U.S. representative from Oklahoma's 5th congressional district (1993–2007)
- Leon Jaworski, special prosecutor during the Watergate Scandal and one of the first partners of the major international law firm Fulbright & Jaworski
- Brad Knott (BA), U.S. representative from North Carolina's 13th congressional district
- Jeff Leach (BA), state representative from District 67 in the Texas House of Representatives since 2013
- Jim Mattox, U.S. representative from Texas's 5th district (1977–1983), member of the Texas House of Representatives from District 33 (East Dallas), 47th attorney general of Texas 1983–1991
- Julie Myers (BA, 1991), former assistant secretary of Homeland Security for U.S. Immigration and Customs Enforcement
- Pat Morris Neff, governor of Texas 1921–1925; president of Baylor 1932–1947
- Lyndon Lowell Olson Jr., former United States ambassador to Sweden and vice chairman of U.S. Advisory Commission on Public Diplomacy
- Walter P. Paluch Jr., former brigadier general in the United States Air Force
- Diane Patrick, Republican member of the Texas House of Representatives from Arlington
- Rand Paul, U.S. senator from Kentucky, and son of former Texas Congressman Ron Paul
- Ken Paxton, Texas attorney general (2015–present) and former member of Texas House and Senate
- Angela Paxton, Texas state senator (2019–present) and wife of Texas Attorney General Ken Paxton
- Chip Pickering (MA, 1989), U.S. representative from Mississippi's 3rd congressional district (1995–2007)
- David Pierce, New Hampshire state representative, 2006–2012, and New Hampshire senator, 2012–present
- Larry Phillips (BBA), Republican member of the Texas House of Representatives since 2003 from Sherman, Texas
- William R. Poage, U.S. representative from Texas's 11th congressional district (1937–1979)
- Ann Richards, governor of Texas 1991–1995
- Sul Ross, governor of Texas 1887–1891
- J. T. Rutherford, U.S. representative from Texas's 16th congressional district (1955–1963)
- Paul Sadler (BA), former state representative and Democratic U.S. Senate nominee in 2012
- Ayman Safadi, Minister of Foreign and Expatriate Affairs of Jordan
- Max Sandlin, U.S. representative from Texas's 1st congressional district (1997–2005)
- Scott Sanford (BBA), member of the Texas House of Representatives from McKinney; certified public accountant and Baptist pastor
- Mark M. Shelton (BS, 1979), Fort Worth pediatrician, specialist in infectious diseases, and Republican member of the Texas House of Representatives from District 97 (2009–2013)
- Max Sherman (BA, 1957), Texas state senator (1971–1977) and president of West Texas A&M University (1977–1982)
- William S. Sessions, former director of the Federal Bureau of Investigation
- David M. Sibley, Texas state senator (1991–2002) and former mayor of Waco
- Larry Taylor (BBA, 1982), Republican member of the Texas Senate from District 11 (2013–2023) and Texas House of Representatives from District 24 (2003–2013)
- Alan Steelman, U.S. representative from Texas's 5th congressional district (1973–1977)
- Abelardo L. Valdez, former United States ambassador and chief of Protocol of the United States
- Jason Villalba, former state representative from District 114 in Dallas County (2013–2019); former candidate for Dallas mayor; member of the Haynes and Boone law firm in Dallas
- Kirk Watson, mayor of Austin (2023–present) and former Texas state senator
- W. Marvin Watson, advisor to President Lyndon Johnson and former Postmaster General
- Mark White, governor of Texas 1983–1987
- Joseph Franklin Wilson, U.S. representative from Texas's 5th congressional district (1947–1955)
- Gita Wirjawan, Minister of Trade of the Republic of Indonesia

=== Religion ===
- George Washington Baines, Baptist clergyman in Arkansas, Louisiana, and Texas; maternal great-grandfather of Lyndon B. Johnson
- B. H. Carroll, first president of Southwestern Baptist Theological Seminary
- Russell H. Dilday, Baptist pastor (Tallowood Baptist Church and others), author, educator, former president of Southwestern Baptist Theological Seminary, one of Texas Monthly's "Texas Twenty"
- James T. Draper, Jr., pastor of First Baptist Euless (1975–1991) and president of Southern Baptist LifeWay Resources (1991–2006)
- Bryan Hollon, dean and president of Trinity Anglican Seminary
- Robert Jeffress, pastor of First Baptist Church (Dallas, Texas)
- Cheryl A. Kirk-Duggan, womanist theologian and ordained elder in the CME Church
- Kyle Lake, pastor and leader in the Emerging Church movement
- J. Frank Norris, popular fundamentalist Baptist preacher and critic of Baylor's embracing of evolution in the 1920s
- Paul Powell, dean of George W. Truett Theological Seminary, pastor, BGCT leader, author
- John R. Rice, Baptist evangelist and pastor; founding editor of The Sword of the Lord, an influential fundamentalist newspaper
- Lester Roloff, fundamentalist Baptist preacher, storyteller, and author
- Kerry Shook, pastor of the Woodlands Church (The Woodlands Texas)
- George W. Truett, pastor of First Baptist Church Dallas 1897–1944, president Baptist World Alliance and Southern Baptist Convention

=== Science and medicine ===
- Hallie Earle, first licensed female physician in Waco, 1902 M.S. from Baylor; only female graduate of 1907 Baylor University Medical School in Dallas
- H. Bentley Glass, geneticist and columnist
- James R. Heath, chemist, Elizabeth W. Gilloon Professor of Chemistry at the California Institute of Technology
- David Hillis, evolutionary biologist and 1999 MacArthur Fellow
- Robert W. McCollum, virologist who made important discoveries regarding polio and hepatitis
- Rod Rohrich, internationally renowned plastic surgeon and chairman of the Department of Plastic Surgery at The University of Texas Southwestern Medical Center at Dallas
- Ada-Rhodes Short, roboticist, professor, and trans and LGBTQ rights activist
- Norman Shumway, pioneering heart surgeon at Stanford University
- John Stapp, physician and physicist who, among other things, studied the effects of acceleration and deceleration forces on humans
- Gordon K. Teal, worked in early efforts to improve transistors

=== Athletics ===
==== Badminton ====
- Tan Joe Hok, legendary Indonesian badminton player

==== Baseball ====
- Ken Patterson, pitcher, Chicago White Sox, Chicago Cubs, Los Angeles Angels (MLB); currently a pitching coach specialist for the Angels
- Pat Combs, pitcher, first round draft pick for the Philadelphia Phillies, played for the Phillies 1989–1992
- Jason Jennings, pitcher, Texas Rangers of Major League Baseball (MLB)
- Ted Lyons, pitcher, Chicago White Sox, 1923–1946, member of the Major League Baseball Hall of Fame
- Max Muncy, outfielder, 2012 5th round draft pick by the Oakland Athletics; now with the Los Angeles Dodgers
- David Murphy, outfielder, 2003 1st round draft pick by the Boston Red Sox; now with the Texas Rangers
- Scott Ruffcorn, pitcher, Chicago White Sox, Philadelphia Phillies (MLB)
- Kelly Shoppach, catcher, New York Mets (MLB)
- Bob Simpson, owner of the Texas Rangers and co-founder of XTO Energy
- Shawn Tolleson, pitcher, Los Angeles Dodgers (MLB)
- Lee Tunnell, pitcher, 1982–1989, for the Pittsburgh Pirates, St. Louis Cardinals, and Minnesota Twins
- Kip Wells, pitcher, in MLB since 1999 and most recently for the San Diego Padres in 2012

==== Men's basketball ====
- Quincy Acy, power forward for the New York Knicks
- James Akinjo, point guard in the Israeli Basketball Premier League
- Carroll Dawson, former assistant coach and general manager for the Houston Rockets 1980–2007
- LaceDarius Dunn (born 1987), basketball player in the Israeli National League
- Freddie Gillespie (2020), basketball player in the Israeli Basketball Premier League
- Melvin Hunt, assistant coach for the Dallas Mavericks and former interim head coach of the Denver Nuggets
- Pierre Jackson, basketball player
- Curtis Jerrells (born 1987), basketball player for Hapoel Jerusalem of the Israeli Premier League
- Vinnie Johnson, former player for the Detroit Pistons (1979–1992); nicknamed "The Microwave" for being able to come off the bench heated up and ready to play; his #15 jersey was retired by the Pistons
- Perry Jones III, forward for the Oklahoma City Thunder
- Manu Lecomte (born 1995), basketball player in the Israeli Basketball Premier League
- Dennis Lindsey, general manager of the Utah Jazz, former Baylor guard (1988–1992)
- Darryl Middleton, professional player for many European teams (won the 2002 Euroleague Cup)
- Quincy Miller, small forward for the Denver Nuggets
- Johnathan Motley (born 1995), first player in franchise history to sign a two-way contract with the Dallas Mavericks; player for Hapoel Tel Aviv of the Israeli Basketball Premier League
- Royce O'Neale, forward for the Utah Jazz
- Taurean Prince, selected with the 12th overall pick in the 2016 NBA draft; forward for the Milwaukee Bucks
- Jackie Robinson, won a gold medal as a guard for the 1948 U.S. Olympic basketball team in London
- Brian Skinner (born 1976), forward for the Los Angeles Clippers
- Terry Teagle, shooting guard for Rockets, Lakers, & Warriors 1982–1993, 16th overall pick (Rockets) in the 1982 NBA draft
- Ekpe Udoh (born 1987), forward for the Beijing Royal Fighters
- Ish Wainright (born 1994), American-Ugandan basketball player in the NBA, and now for Hapoel Tel Aviv of the Israeli Basketball Premier League
- Micheal Williams, former point guard for the Detroit Pistons, Phoenix Suns, Charlotte Hornets, Indiana Pacers, Minnesota Timberwolves, and Toronto Raptors
- David Wesley, 16-year NBA veteran and former guard with the Cleveland Cavaliers, Houston Rockets, Charlotte Hornets, Boston Celtics, and New Jersey Nets; current television color analyst for the New Orleans Pelicans

==== Women's basketball ====
- Kalani Brown (born 1997), player in the Israeli Female Basketball Premier League
- Jody Conradt, legendary women's basketball coach at the University of Texas
- Lauren Cox, forward for the Indiana Fever
- Brittney Griner, WNBA first-round draft pick (Phoenix 2013)
- Sonja Hogg, head women's basketball coach at Louisiana Tech and Baylor
- Sheila Lambert, drafted by the Charlotte Sting in the First Round (No. 7 overall) of the 2002 WNBA Draft
- Bernice Mosby, WNBA first-round draft pick (Washington 2007)
- Kim Mulkey, Lady Bear basketball coach; first person in NCAA history to win a basketball national championship as a player, assistant coach, and head coach; won 2 NCAA Championships (2005, 2012) as head coach at Baylor and won the Big 12 regular season championship 9 times (2005, 2011–2018)
- Sophia Young, All-Star forward and 2006 first-round draft pick for the San Antonio Silver Stars of the WNBA

==== Football ====
- Walter Abercrombie, NFL running back for the Pittsburgh Steelers and Philadelphia Eagles
- Riley Biggs, American football center
- Matt Bryant, NFL placekicker for the Atlanta Falcons
- Cody Carlson, NFL quarterback taken in the 3rd round of the 1987 NFL draft for the Houston Oilers (1988–1994)
- Nakia Codie, NFL defensive back
- Ray Crockett, NFL cornerback drafted by the Detroit Lions in 1989, won two Super Bowl rings with the Denver Broncos, BU Hall of Fame Class of 2008
- Cotton Davidson, played and coached at Baylor, quarterback in the NFL and AFL
- Paul Dickson, NFL defensive and offensive lineman for the Minnesota Vikings and the Dallas Cowboys
- Santana Dotson, Tampa Bay Buccaneers defensive lineman, 1992 NFL Defensive Rookie of the Year, also played for the Green Bay Packers and Washington Redskins (1992–2002)
- L.G. Dupre, running back for the Baltimore Colts and the Dallas Cowboys
- Thomas Everett, NFL defensive back with the Pittsburgh Steelers, Dallas Cowboys, and Tampa Bay Buccaneers (1987–1995)
- James Francis, NFL linebacker for the Cincinnati Bengals and Washington Redskins (1990–1999)
- Ron Francis, cornerback for the Dallas Cowboys and the New England Patriots
- Malcolm Frank, Canadian Football League defensive back
- Hayden Fry, NCAA Division I-A coach (1962–1998), inducted into the College Football Hall of Fame in 2003
- Terrance Ganaway, running back for the St. Louis Rams
- Kelvin Garmon, offensive guard for the Dallas Cowboys, San Diego Chargers and the Cleveland Browns
- Lester Gatewood, NFL center for the Green Bay Packers
- Dennis Gentry, NFL running back (1982–1992), selected in the 4th round of the 1982 NFL draft by the Chicago Bears
- David Gettis, 2010 NFL draft 198th overall pick by the Carolina Panthers
- Bill Glass, Round 1 draft pick and defensive tackle with the Detroit Lions (1958–1961) and the Cleveland Browns (1962–1968)
- Josh Gordon, Wide receiver, Drafted in the second round of the 2012 supplemental draft by the Cleveland Browns
- Robert Griffin III, Heisman Trophy winning (2011) Baylor quarterback; 2012 NFL draft 2nd overall draft pick by the Washington Redskins
- Greg Hawthorne, NFL running back with the Pittsburgh Steelers and New England Patriots
- Heath Herring (attended), football player and wrestler; retired mixed martial artist fighter, formerly for the Ultimate Fighting Championship
- Darrell Hogan, NFL player for the Pittsburgh Steelers
- Jeff Ireland, kicker at Baylor and general manager of the Miami Dolphins
- Joe Jackson, American football player
- Clay Johnston, linebacker for the Los Angeles Rams
- George Koch, NFL and AAFC player
- Khari Long, defensive end for the Chicago Bears
- James Lynch, defensive tackle for the Minnesota Vikings
- Gerald McNeil, "The Ice Cube", NFL and USFL wide receiver who played in the 1980s
- Fred Miller, offensive tackle for the St. Louis Rams (1996–1999), Tennessee Titans (2000–2004), and the Chicago Bears (2005–2008)
- Denzel Mims, wide receiver for the New York Jets
- Mike Nelms, All-Pro NFL and CFL defensive back
- J. W. Pender, University of North Texas head coach (1913–1914)
- Luke Prestridge, former all-pro NFL punter with the Denver Broncos
- Robert Quiroga, Arena Football League player
- John B. Reid, University of North Texas head coach
- Bravvion Roy, defensive tackle for the Carolina Panthers
- Lloyd Russell, University of North Texas head coach (1942); Baylor Bears baseball head coach (1940–1941, 1958–1961)
- Daniel Sepulveda, punter for Pittsburgh Steelers; two time Ray Guy Award winner
- Del Shofner, wide receiver for L.A. Rams (1957–1960), New York Giants (1961–1967); five-time All-Pro and Pro Bowler
- Mike Singletary, linebacker for the Chicago Bears (1981–1992); head coach of the San Francisco 49ers (2008–2010); assistant head coach for the Minnesota Vikings, inducted into the Pro Football Hall of Fame in 1998
- Jack Sisco, University of North Texas head coach
- Jason Smith, offensive tackle, 2nd overall draft pick by the St. Louis Rams in 2009 NFL draft
- Justin Snow, long snapper signed with the Indianapolis Colts in 2000 as an undrafted free agent; member of the long snapper, holder, kicker trio to not miss a field goal (2003 season)
- Jack Steadman, former chairman, vice president, president and general manager for the Kansas City Chiefs
- Phil Taylor, defensive tackle for the Cleveland Browns, 21st overall draft pick in 2011 NFL draft
- Don Trull, All-American quarterback at Baylor; played six seasons with the AFL Houston Oilers (1964–1969)
- J. D. Walton, offensive center for the Denver Broncos
- Danny Watkins, offensive tackle for the Philadelphia Eagles, 23rd overall draft pick in 2011 NFL draft
- John Westbrook, first African American to play football in the Southwest Conference
- Robert Williams, cornerback for the Dallas Cowboys, Phoenix Cardinals and the Kansas City Chiefs
- Terrance Williams, wide receiver, 2013 NFL draft 74th overall draft pick by the Dallas Cowboys
- Bob Woodruff, former head coach at the University of Florida and former athletic director of the University of Tennessee
- Kendall Wright, wide receiver for the Tennessee Titans, 20th overall draft pick in 2012 NFL draft

==== Golf ====
- Jason Hill, golfer
- Jimmy Walker, PGA Tour, PGA Championship winner

==== Gymnastics ====
- Kiara Nowlin, member of the U.S. Junior National Trampoline and Tumbling Team, three-time gold medalist at the World Age Games, three-time gold medalist at The Cheerleading Worlds

==== Tennis ====
- Benjamin Becker, German professional player; defeated Andre Agassi in Agassi's final match in the 2006 U.S. Open
- Benedikt Dorsch, German professional player
- John Peers, Australian professional player

==== Track and field ====
- Trayvon Bromell, first junior to surpass the 10-second barrier for the 100 meters; had a spot on the 2016 U.S. Olympic team
- Michael Johnson, winner of five Olympic gold medals and nine-time world champion
- KC Lightfoot, placed fourth in the pole vault at the 2020 Summer Olympics
- Jeremy Wariner, winner of gold medals at the 2004 Summer Olympics in Athens, Greece for the individual 400 meter and the 4 × 400 meter
- Darold Williamson, winner of a gold medal at the 2004 Summer Olympics in Athens, Greece in the 4 × 400 meter
- Reggie Witherspoon, winner of a gold medal at the 2008 Summer Olympics in Beijing for the 4 × 400 meter along with teammate Jeremy Wariner

==== Volleyball ====
- Laura Daniela Lloreda, Mexican/Puerto Rican player

== Faculty ==
=== Administration ===
- Reddin Andrews, president of Baylor University 1885–1886
- George Washington Baines, maternal great-grandfather of U.S. President Lyndon Baines Johnson, served briefly as natural science professor and president of Baylor University at its first location in Independence, Texas
- Samuel Palmer Brooks, president of Baylor University 1902–1931
- Rufus Columbus Burleson, president of Baylor University 1851–1861, and again 1886–1897
- Oscar Henry Cooper, president of Baylor University 1899–1902, and of Simmons College, now known as Hardin–Simmons University 1902–1909
- David E. Garland, interim president of Baylor University 2008–2010 and 2016, and dean of George W. Truett Theological Seminary at Baylor University 2007–2016
- Henry Lee Graves, president of Baylor University 1846–1851
- John M. Lilley, president of the University of Nevada, Reno 2001–2005 and Baylor University 2006–2008
- Abner Vernon McCall, president of Baylor University 1961–1981
- Herbert H. Reynolds, president of Baylor University 1981–1995
- Robert B. Sloan, president of Baylor University 1995–2005, and of Houston Baptist University 2006–present
- Ken Starr, special counsel during the Whitewater controversy and later president of Baylor
- William D. Underwood, interim president of Baylor University 2005–2006, and of Mercer University 2006–present
- William R. White, president of Hardin–Simmons University 1940–1943, and of Baylor University 1948–1961

=== Coaches ===
- Scott Drew, men's basketball coach
- Clyde Hart, former head track coach and director of track and field
- Sonja Hogg, former head woman's basketball coach at Louisiana Tech University and at Baylor University
- Glenn Moore, softball coach, played both football and baseball in college and softball with "The King and His Court"
- Kim Mulkey, Lady Bear basketball coach, college player at the Louisiana Tech University and on the US Olympic Team
- Grant Teaff, former football head coach (1972–1992), member of the College Football Hall of Fame and executive director of the American Football Coaches Association
- Randy Waldrum, founded the Baylor University women's soccer program, and went 46–14–3 1996–1998; current head coach of the University of Notre Dame's women's soccer team
- George Woodruff, former Baylor football coach

=== Biology ===
- Maria Elena Bottazzi, Distinguished Professor of Biology
- Lula Pace (1868–1925), first female professor at Baylor with a PhD

=== Economics ===
- Earl Grinols, Distinguished Professor of Economics, notable works include contributions to the study of the economic effect of gambling and casinos
- David VanHoose, Herman W. Lay Professor of Private Enterprise; has written text books and papers used in the field of economics

=== Engineering ===
- W. Mack Grady, professor of Electrical and Computer Engineering
- Robert J. Marks II, Distinguished Professor of Electrical and Computer Engineering, notable work in application of artificial neural networks, brachytherapy, wireless communication, detection theory, and Fourier analysis; a proponent of intelligent design; featured in the documentary-style film Expelled: No Intelligence Allowed

=== English ===
- Greg Garrett, professor of English, winner of the Pirate's Alley William Faulkner Prize for Fiction, and author of several books

=== Geology and geography ===
- Frank Carney, chairman of department of Geology and Geography

=== History ===
- Beth Allison Barr, James Vardaman Endowed Professor of History
- Philip Jenkins, Distinguished Professor of History and co-director of the Program on Historical Studies of Religion

=== Mathematics ===
- David Arnold, Ralph and Jean Storm Professor of Mathematics
- Vivienne Malone-Mayes, first African-American Mathematics professor at Baylor
- Dorina Mitrea, professor and department chair of Mathematics

=== Philosophy ===
- Francis J. Beckwith, associate professor and Christian philosopher
- Jean Bethke Elshtain, Visiting Distinguished Professor of Religion and Public Life
- C. Stephen Evans, University Professor of Philosophy and Humanities
- Thomas S. Hibbs, dean of the Honors College and Distinguished Professor of Philosophy
- Jonathan Kvanvig, Distinguished Professor of Philosophy, Christian philosopher, specialist in Epistemology and Philosophy of Religion
- Alexander Pruss, philosopher, mathematician and the co-director of graduate studies in philosophy.
- Robert Campbell Roberts, Distinguished Professor of Ethics

=== Physics ===
- Anzhong Wang, theoretical physicist, specialized in gravitation, cosmology and astroparticle physics; currently working on cosmology in string/M theory and the Hořava-Lifshitz gravity
- Bennie Ward, theoretical particle physicist, fellow of the American Physical Society, co-editor-in-chief of The Open Nuclear and Particle Physics Journal

=== Religion ===
- Carlos Cardoza-Orlandi, Frederick E. Roach Chair in World Christianity
- Edward R. Dalglish, biblical scholar and professor of Old Testament
- Philip Jenkins, director of Program for Historical Studies of Religion
- Ralph C. Wood, university professor and author of The Gospel According to Tolkien

=== Social sciences ===
- Marc H. Ellis, controversial author of numerous articles and books on Israel and Jewish affairs
- Jay Hein, director of the Program on Faith & Generosity and former Director of the White House Office of Faith-Based and Community Initiatives
- Jerry Pattengale, distinguished senior fellow at the Baylor Institute for Studies of Religion and director of the Green Scholars Initiative
- Rodney Stark, advocate of the application of rational choice theory in the sociology of religion

=== Truett Seminary ===
- Roger E. Olson, professor of Theology, author of The Story of Christian Theology Twenty Centuries of Tradition & Reform

== Presidents ==
The following is a list of presidents of Baylor University since 1846:

No.	Image	Name	Term start	Term end	Refs.
1		Henry Lee Graves	1846	1851	
2a		Rufus Columbus Burleson (Note: Burleson served twice as president, twenty years apart.)	1851	1861	
3		George Washington Baines	1861	1863	
4		William Carey Crane	1864	February 27, 1885 (Note: Died in office.)	
5		Reddin Andrews	1885	1886	
2b		Rufus Columbus Burleson	1886	1897	
– (Note: Lattimore led the university temporarily as chairman of the faculty)		John C. Lattimore	1897	1899	
6		Oscar Henry Cooper	1899	March 31, 1902	
7		Samuel Palmer Brooks	1902	May 14, 1931	
acting		William Sims Allen	May 15, 1931	1932	
8		Pat Morris Neff	1932	1947	
9		William R. White	February 1, 1948	April 18, 1961	
10		Abner Vernon McCall	April 18, 1961	May 31, 1981	
11		Herbert H. Reynolds	June 1, 1981	May 31, 1995	
12		Robert B. Sloan	June 1, 1995	May 31, 2005	
interim		William D. Underwood	June 1, 2005	December 31, 2005	
13		John M. Lilley	January 1, 2006	July 24, 2008 (Note: Lilley was fired by Board of Regents.)	
acting		Harold R. Cunningham	July 25, 2008	August 19, 2008	
interim		David E. Garland	August 20, 2008	May 31, 2010	
14		Ken Starr	June 1, 2010	May 31, 2016 (Note: Starr was removed from office by Board of Regents.)	
interim		David E. Garland	June 1, 2016	May 31, 2017	
15		Linda Livingstone	June 1, 2017	Present	

Table notes:
