= The Texas Collection =

- 31.54561576967773°N 97.11801127795066°W
- Location: Waco, TX, United States
- Type: Academic library
- Established: 1923

Access and use
- Circulation: Special Collection (rare materials): most materials do not circulate
- Population served: students, faculty, staff, general public

Other information
- Affiliation: Baylor University
- Website: www.baylor.edu/lib/texas

The Texas Collection is one of the special libraries at Baylor University in Waco, Texas. Situated in the Carroll Library Building, the Texas Collection serves as a collection of various documents, items and artifacts significant to Texas history.

== History ==
The Texas Collection, founded in 1923 by a gift of several hundred items from the personal Texas history collection of Dr. Kenneth Hazen Aynesworth, is one of the specialized libraries of Baylor University. From its early beginnings, The Texas Collection has grown to the largest privately held collection of Texana, containing nearly 200,000 volumes, more than 3,000 current serial subscription titles, and over 13,000 audio-visual pieces. In addition, there are over 1.4 million photographs, over 3,600 oral history tapes/transcripts, approximately 15,000 maps, and over 2,500 archival collections.

The original materials, along with other Texas-related holdings of the Baylor University Library, were housed in a single room of the Carroll Library Building until 1939, at which time it was moved to occupy an entire wing on the second floor of Pat Neff Hall. By the end of another 15 years, The Texas Collection was in need of yet more space. In 1955, The Texas Collection returned home to Carroll Library building, this time with the entire third floor designated for the collection. In 1968, with the completion of the Moody Memorial Library, the general collection moved out of the Carroll Library Building, leaving three floors solely to The Texas Collection. In 1993, the University renovated the Carroll Library Building, forcing The Texas Collection into a temporary home in the basement of Roxy Grove Hall.

== Print Materials ==
The collection of print materials contains nearly 200,000 volumes concerning Texas and Texans. The collection is strong in Texas history, genealogy, popular literature, Baptists and their institutions, religious denominations, and Texas cookery.

Print materials come in a variety of formats including books, periodicals, vertical files, microforms, and audiovisual materials. The collection is a regional depository for Texas state documents and receives publications from state agencies. It is also a depository in the Regional Historical Records Depository program and provides these microfilmed county records for both in-house use and Inter-library loan patrons.

== Manuscript Archives ==
The Texas Collection preserves and makes accessible manuscript collections about the diverse lives of Texans—their faith, politics, struggles, and triumphs. These daily events, recorded in the collections from before Texas’ birth as a Republic to the present, link Texas and Texans past with those of today. This rich history includes diaries, letters, photographs, and other materials on all things Texas. Collection strengths include early Texas, Baptist and missionary history, the Civil War, World War I and World War II, Branch Davidians, and the Central Texas region.

== University Archives ==
The University Archives is Baylor University’s memory, providing insight into the rich heritage that gives context and meaning to the university’s future. Holdings include Board records, presidential papers, office/departmental records, university publications, student organization records, and other materials that are invaluable resources in documenting Baylor's past.

== Map Collection ==
The majority of maps available at The Texas Collection focus on the state of Texas. The collection contains over 17,000 maps that show the geographic region through its various transitions into the present day state. The map collection in housed in the Frances C. Poage Map room on the second floor of Carroll Library at Baylor University, a gift from former Congressman W. R. Poage.

== Collections ==
Collection holdings include:

- Pat Neff
- Jules Bledsoe
- Ruth Montgomery
- Leon Jaworski
- Dorothy Scarborough
- Madison Cooper
- Grant Teaff
- Samuel Palmer Brooks
- Lawrence Sullivan Ross
- Branch Davidians
- Gordon Kidd Teal
- Elisabet Ney
- Rufus Columbus Burleson
- Audie Murphy
- American Association of University Women
- Richard Coke
- Vivienne Malone-Mayes
- Jacob De Cordova
- Camp MacArthur
- William Cowper Brann
- American Civil War
- World War II
- Fort Parker
- William Carey Crane
- Abner Vernon McCall
- Oscar Henry Cooper
- George Washington Baines
- Robert B. Sloan
- Independence, Texas
- Texas, Our Texas
- American Association of University Professors
- Clark W. Thompson (Texas politician)
