= Robert Roberts =

Robert, Rob, or Bob Roberts may refer to:

== People ==
=== Politicians ===
- Robert H. Roberts (1837–1888), New York politician
- Robert W. Roberts (1784–1865), U.S. Representative from Mississippi
- Robert Roberts (Queensland politician) (1869–1934), Australian politician for East Toowoomba between 1912 and 1934
- Bob Roberts (Australian politician) (born 1952), Member of the New South Wales Legislative Assembly
- Robert Roberts (American politician) (1848–1939), mayor of Burlington, Vermont
- Rob Roberts (politician) (born 1979), Welsh Member of Parliament

=== Sportsmen ===
- Bob Roberts (footballer, born 1859) (1859–1929), West Bromwich Albion F.C. and England international football goalkeeper
- Robert Mills-Roberts (1862–1935), Preston North End F.C. and Wales international football goalkeeper
- Bob Roberts (footballer, born 1863) (1863–1950), Wrexham A.F.C. and Wales international footballer
- Robert Roberts (footballer, born 1864) (1864–1932), Bolton Wanderers F.C., Preston North End F.C. and Wales international footballer
- Robert Roberts (footballer, born 1865) (1865–1945), Rhosllanerchrugog, Crewe Alexandra F.C. and Wales international footballer
- Robert Lee Roberts (1868–1943), Chester F.C. and Wales international footballer
- Robert Roberts (footballer, born 1892) (1892–?), Manchester United F.C. footballer
- Robert Roberts (rugby league) (1912–1979), rugby league footballer of the 1930s and 1940s
- Rob Roberts (rugby league) (born 1978), Welsh rugby league player of the 1990s, 2000s and 2010s
- Bob Roberts (Australian footballer) (born 1930), former Australian rules footballer

=== Other ===
- Bob Roberts (cinematographer), American cinematographer of Argentine cinema
- Bob Roberts (folksinger) (1907–1982), British musician, sailor, journalist and author
- Bob Roberts (singer) (1871–1930), American vaudeville singer and recording artist
- Robert Campbell Roberts (born 1942), American philosopher
- Robert Davies Roberts (1851–1911), Welsh academic and educational administrator
- Robert L. Chidlaw-Roberts (1896–1989), British military aviator
- Robert Richford Roberts (1778–1843), American Methodist bishop
- Robert Roberts (butler) (1780–1860), author of The House Servant's Directory: A Monitor for Private Families
- Robert Roberts (cardiologist) (born 1940), Canadian cardiologist
- Robert Roberts (Christadelphian) (1839–1898), Scottish journalist, writer and preacher
- Robert Roberts (priest) (1680–1741), Welsh cleric and writer
- Robert Roberts (writer) (1905–1974), British author of The Classic Slum
- R. Silyn Roberts (1871–1930), Welsh-language author

== Other ==
- Bob Roberts, a 1992 film written and directed by and starring Tim Robbins

== See also ==
- Bobby Roberts (disambiguation)
