= James Norvell =

James Norvell may refer to:

- Jay Norvell (Merritt James Norvell III, born 1963), American football coach and former player
- James R. Norvell (1902–1969), Justice of the Supreme Court of Texas
- Aubrey James Norvell, sniper who shot civil rights activist James Meredith
