= Justice McCall =

Justice McCall may refer to:

- Abner V. McCall (1915–1995), justice of the Supreme Court of Texas in 1956
- Edward Everett McCall (1863–1924), justice of the Supreme Court of New York (the trial court of the state) from 1902 to 1913
