= Waco Tribune-Herald =

Newspaper in Waco, Texas

Coordinates: 31°33′9.79″N 97°8′1.9″W

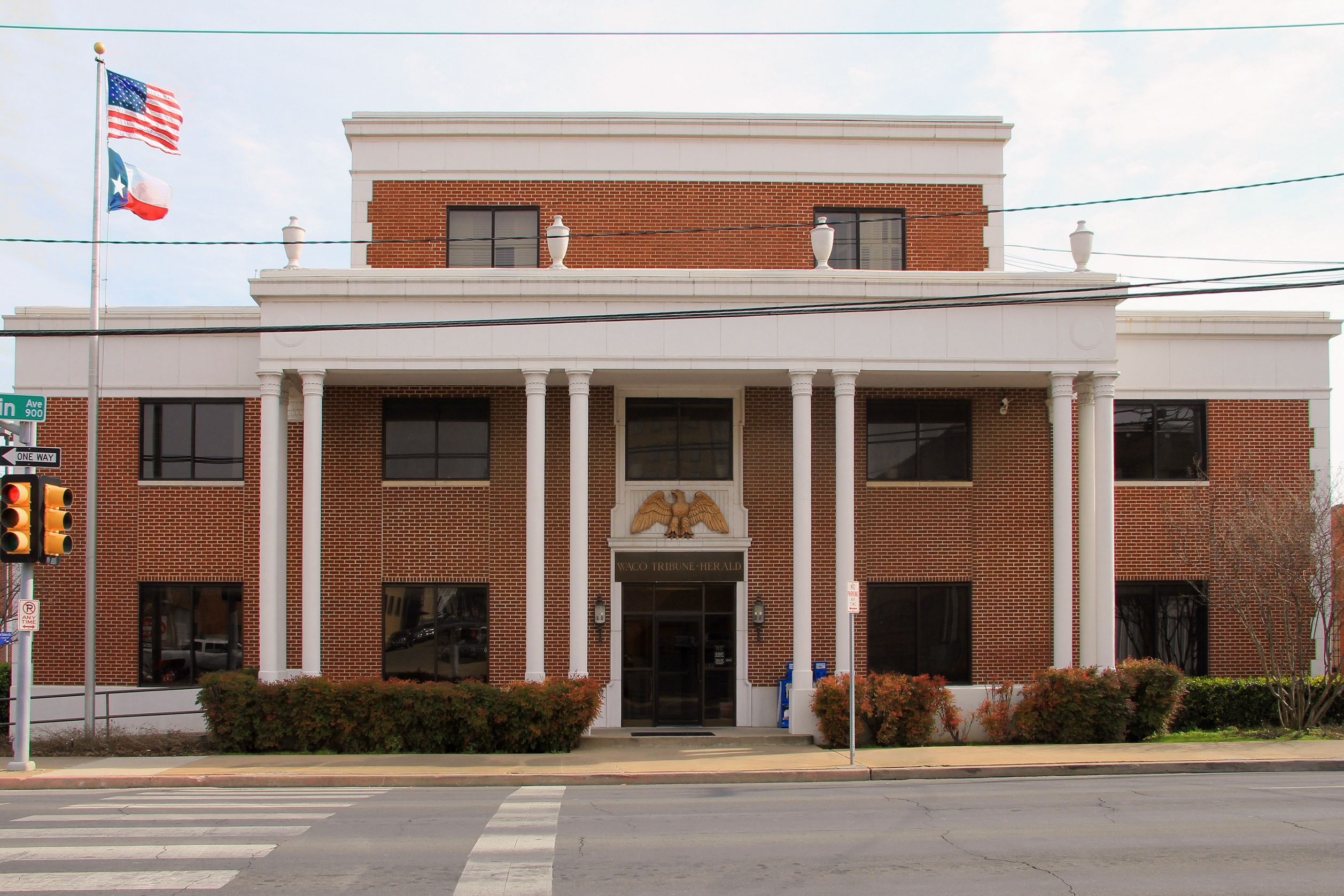
- Type: Daily newspaper
- Format: Broadsheet
- Owner: Lee Enterprises
- Editor: Steve Boggs
- Founded: 1892 (as the Waco Evening Telephone)
- Language: English
- Headquarters: 215 S. Second St., Suite 301; Waco, Texas 76701; United States
- Circulation: 11,566 Daily (as of 2023)
- Website: wacotrib.com

The Waco Tribune-Herald is an American daily newspaper serving Waco, Texas, and vicinity.

== Background ==
The newspaper has its roots in five predecessors, beginning with the Waco Evening Telephone in 1892. The Tribune-Herald took its current identity when E.S. Fentress and Charles Marsh, who owned the Waco News-Tribune, bought the Waco Times-Herald. That purchase was the beginning of Newspapers, Inc., a chain that eventually owned 13 newspapers.

The newspapers stayed in the Fentress family until 1976, when they were sold to Cox Newspapers, which continued to own the chain until 2009, when Waco businessman Clifton Robinson bought the paper. In 2012, Robinson sold the newspaper to Berkshire Hathaway.

The Tribune-Herald is best known for "The Sinful Messiah", a series of stories in February and March 1993 about the Branch Davidian sect headquartered in a compound in Mount Carmel, near Waco. The series reported that leader Vernon Howell, later known as David Koresh, had turned the group into a cult, engaged in polygamy, abused children living in the compound, and was amassing an arsenal of weapons. The Tribune-Herald had been reporting on a number of issues about the compound in the months before the series. The ATF later claimed that the raid was moved up a day, to February 28, 1993, in response to the series, which the ATF had tried to prevent from being published. Beginning February 1, ATF agents had three meetings with Tribune-Herald staff regarding a delay in publication of "The Sinful Messiah". The paper was first told by the ATF that the raid would take place February 22, which they changed to March 1, and then ultimately to an indefinite date. In a February 24 meeting between Tribune-Herald staff and ATF agent Phillip Chojancki and two other agents, the ATF could not give the newspaper staff a clear idea of what action was planned or when. The Tribune-Herald informed ATF they were publishing the series, which included an editorial calling for local authorities to act. Personnel of the Tribune-Herald found out about the imminent raid after the first installment of "The Sinful Messiah" had already appeared on February 27. A shootout occurred, leading to a 51-day siege that ended in an attack on the compound, which resulted in its destruction that was seen live by television viewers around America.

In 2021, the newspaper announced it would move out of its 70-year-old building, which is being bought by the Magnolia brand helmed by Chip and Joanna Gaines, whose Magnolia Market at the Silos attraction is located just a few blocks away. The television personalities plan to make the facility their corporate headquarters in 2022.

Starting June 20, 2023, the print edition of the newspaper will be reduced to three days a week: Tuesday, Thursday and Saturday. Also, the newspaper will transition from being delivered by a traditional newspaper delivery carrier to mail delivery by the U.S. Postal Service.

== Waco Today Magazine ==
The paper published a monthly lifestyle magazine from June 1997 to May 2023. It was discontinued with the May 2023 edition, ending its run at 26 years (312 issues). Most issues focused on a specific topic, such as medical, family-owned businesses, homes or dining out for the Waco area.
