= Akira Takayama (economist) =

Akira Takayama (1932–1996) was a Japanese-born mathematical economist, researching international trade, both micro and macroeconomics, and monetary economics but always pushing a mathematical approach. He travelled widely working at the following universities: the International Christian University (1962–1964), the University of Manchester (1964–1965), Purdue University (1966–1980), Texas A&M University (1972–1982), the University of Kyoto (1982–1985), and Southern Illinois University (1983–1993) and he worked as an editor on the following journals: Journal of Macroeconomics, Journal of Economic Integration, Review of International Economics and Economics Letters.

== Selected publications ==
=== Textbooks ===
- Takayama, A. (1985). Mathematical economics. Cambridge University Press.
- Takayama, A. (1993). Analytical methods in economics. University of Michigan Press.
- Takayama, A. (1972). International trade; an approach to the theory.

=== Research ===
- Takayama, A. (1982). On Theorems of General Competitive Equilibrium of Production and Trade. Keio Economic Studies, 19(1).
- Takayama, A. (1963). On a Two-Sector Model of Economic Growth—A Comparative Statics Analysis—. The Review of Economic Studies, 30(2), 95-104.
- Takayama, A. (1969). Behavior of the firm under regulatory constraint. The American Economic Review, 59(3), 255-260.
