= The NoZe Brotherhood =

Secret society at Baylor University, US

- Founded: 1918; 108 years ago Baylor University
- Type: Secret
- Affiliation: Independent
- Status: Active
- Scope: Local
- Motto: "Ye Shall Know Them by Their Noses"
- Colors: Baby pink and Baby blue
- Publication: The Rope
- Chapters: 1
- Nickname: NoZemen
- Headquarters: Waco, Texas; United States

The NoZe Brotherhood is an American collegiate secret society. It was established in 1918 at Baylor University in Waco, Texas. From the society's inception through to the early 1960s, members were open about their participation, but they now keep their identities secret. It is the oldest men's social organization on the Baylor campus.

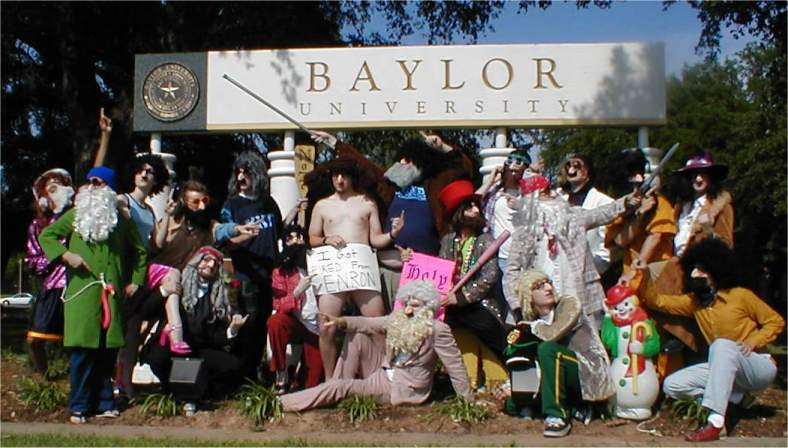
The NoZe Brotherhood, circa 2002

== History ==
Founded in Brooks Hall in 1918, the society was originally formed as a joke regarding Leonard Shoaf, a freshman with a large nose. Shoaf's nose was of "such great length and breadth of nostril" that his friends proclaimed they could "form a club around it". The group was said to be named Nose Brotherhood after Shoaf's nose. The group was formed by a group of men who often met inside Brooks and decided they wanted to create their own men's club, with the Baylor University Chamber of Commerce as the only other option.

In 1924, the members of the club began wearing noses, a different one for each member, as well as unorthodox costumes. This year, the club also began to accept members from dorms other than Brooks. Many of the real names of the original members are impossible to find since they are all given and known by NoZe Brother names.

The society became a popular, irreverent campus fixture in the years that followed, poking fun at its rivals the Baylor University Chamber of Commerce, appearing in Baylor's yearbook the Round-Up, and writing the occasional humorous piece for the yearbook or Baylor's newspaper The Lariat. Targets of the NoZe Brothers' mirth have included Baylor's faculty, administration, the Southern Baptist Convention, various student organizations, and themselves.

In the mid-1960s, the society's relationship with Baylor's administration became more precarious, due primarily to acts of vandalism: the repeated painting of a campus bridge in the traditional NoZe color of pink, followed by an alleged arson attack on the bridge, the details of which are disputed. The group was expelled from campus in 1965 for publishing curse words in its publication, The Rope.

The group returned to campus in 1967 as a secret society, changing the spelling of its name from "Nose" to "NoZe". It adopted a guerrilla profile, crashing various campus events such as "Sing", Chapel, and Homecoming parades. In 1999, it was again banned from campus for an article in The Rope that was "racially insensitive". Although not officially recognized by the university, it is the oldest men's organization on the Baylor campus.

== Symbols ==
The NoZe Brotherhood was named after a joke regarding the group's first president, Leonard Shoaf, a freshman with a large nose. The group is known for wearing wigs, costumes, and Groucho Marx-style glasses, noses, and mustaches, designed to hide its members' identities. The NoZe Brotherhood's colors are baby pink and baby blue. Its motto is "Ye Shall Know Them by Their Noses". Its publication is The Rope.

The Lorde Mayor leads the NoZe Brotherhood. The Bored of Graft consists of past Lordes Mayors, who are available to advise the current Lorde Mayor. The Cunning Linguist acts as the head of communications and editor of The Rope. The Shekel Keeper acts as the group's treasurer and head of advertising. Members are called NoZemen, new members are called Neophytes, and graduated members are called "exiles." The NoZemen call romantic partners of the members "fortunates" and non-members "infidels."

Leonard Shoft is a figurehead and saint of the organization, known as Brother LongNoZe. The NoZe Brotherhood honors Brother LongNoZe in prose and song with ditties such as "This Old God", "When the NoZe is Blown up Yonder", and "Rock Around the Cross". The traditional NoZe saga "The Cry of the Enormous Rabbit" is usually recited semiannually. The NoZe prayer is basically "Now I Lay Me Down to Sleep" recited backward with appropriate changes.

== Membership ==
New members join the NoZe Brotherhood through a process known as "UnRush", held each semester. The NoZe will announce the time and place of UnRush in the first Rope of the semester, and invite candidates to submit a humorous, satirical, or absurdist paper of 10,365 words or less. During UnRush, the Lorde Mayor will prophesy to and harangue the attendant masses on some matter of topical interest. Each pledge class that becomes a part of the brotherhood is required to complete a "class project", or a group prank.

From the society's inception in the 1920s through to the early 1960s, members were open about their participation, but they now keep their identities secret. Some members choose to reveal their identity at graduation by wearing their glasses around their neck.

== Activities ==
The society has held its Annual Pink Tea since May 17, 1929.

The society is liberal in handing out awards, titles, and various sobriquets; in fact, if a NoZeman feels that his fellow members have not seen fit to bestow sufficient honors upon him, he is encouraged to come up with his own. NoZe honors typically begin with the prefix "Keko Keeper of...", the meaning of which is apparently lost to history.

In 1954, the society began publishing its own satirical newspaper, The Rope, which spoofs the campus newspaper The Lariat, takes aim at Baylor University and the Baptist Church, employs satire and absurdity, and has a unique writing style known as "NoZe prose". The group kept a record of everything they did as a group called the "Holy Law"; sometime after World War II, the book was lost.

The Noze Brotherhood has also participated in Baylor's homecoming parade. In 2016, they attached a rug on a truck bumper to represent the university sweeping things under the rug, commenting on the university's sexual assault scandal. The group is also known to paint the noses of campus statues pink.

=== Disruptions ===
NoZe Glasses on Old Main

The NoZe Brotherhood's campus pranks are called disruptions.

- Integrating the Baylor Homecoming Parade, 1941
- Mud flaps on Waco Hall
- Turning Pat Neff pink
- Turning the fountain pink
- Taking the ozone layer hostage, 1970s
- Cancelling Homecoming, 1978
- Killing Herb Reynolds, 1980s
- 24-Hour Secular Wall, 1997
- Cancelling Diadeloso, 2000
- Winning Bear Downs via a four-man bike, 2002
- Dropping 4,000 ping-pong balls in chapel, 2003
- Stealing 'The Rock'
- The Race for the Pure, 2004
- Giant NoZe Glasses on Old Main, 2006
- Bringing a Donkey to Chapel, 2007
- Acting as interim Parking Service Attendants, 2009
- 9.5 Theses on Waco Hall, 2016

== Notable members ==
The current U.S. Senator from Kentucky, Rand Paul, was a member, according to GQ Magazine.

=== Honorary members ===
Kinky Friedman, a.k.a. Bro. The Yellow NoZe of Texas

An ordinary brother is referred to as 'an honorary member' of the society. Some include:

- Bob Bullock – Lt. Governor of Texas
- George W. Bush – President of the United States
- Bennett Cerf (Bro. Board NoZe) – publisher and humorist
- John Dean (Bro. Dean of Dirty Tricks) – White House Counsel for President Richard Nixon
- Kinky Friedman (Bro. The Yellow NoZe of Texas) – country music singer and Texas gubernatorial candidate
- Hayden Fry (Bro. Crotch Grabber) – college football coach
- John Glenn (Bro. GemiNoZe) – U.S. Senator and NASA astronaut
- Billy Graham (Bro. Cracker NoZe Graham) – evangelist
- Robert Griffin III (Bro. HeismaNoZe Trophy) – Baylor quarterback and recipient of the Heisman Trophy
- Bob Hope (Bro. SkiNoZe Hope) – comedian and actor
- Leon Jaworski (Bro. Water NoZe Jaworski) – special prosecutor during the Watergate scandal
- John M. Lilley (Bro. Easter NoZe) – President of Baylor University
- Dan Rather (Bro. CBS Evening NoZe) – CBS News anchor
- Robert B. Sloan (Bro. Liniment NoZe) – President of Baylor University
- Kenneth Starr (Bro. Non Hostis HumaNoZe Generis) – President of Baylor University and independent counsel whose investigation led to President Bill Clinton's impeachment
- William D. Underwood (Bro. Pro BoNoZe) – President of Mercer University and interim President of Baylor University
- 2011–12 Baylor Lady Bears basketball team (Bros. 40 and NoZe) – the entire team was inducted following their undefeated national championship season
