= One Month to Live =

2008 book by Kerry Shook and Chris Shook

One Month To Live
- Author: Kerry Shook, Chris Shook
- Subject: Advice
- Publisher: WaterBrook Press
- Publication date: 2008-5-2
- ISBN: 978-0-7393-5849-8
- OCLC: 192006300

One Month To Live: Thirty Days To A No Regrets Life is a book by Woodlands Church pastor Kerry Shook and his wife Chris Shook. It was published on February 5, 2008, by WaterBrook Press, a division of Random House. It was a New York Times bestseller.
