= Bobby Roberts =

Bobby Roberts may refer to:

- Bobby Roberts (basketball) (1927–2002), American college basketball coach
- Bobby Roberts (footballer) (born 1940), Scottish athlete and manager
- Bob Roberts (cinematographer), American-born cinematographer of Argentine cinema in the 1940s

== See also ==
- Robert Roberts (disambiguation)
- Roberts (surname)
