= Lula Pace =

American botanist and geologist

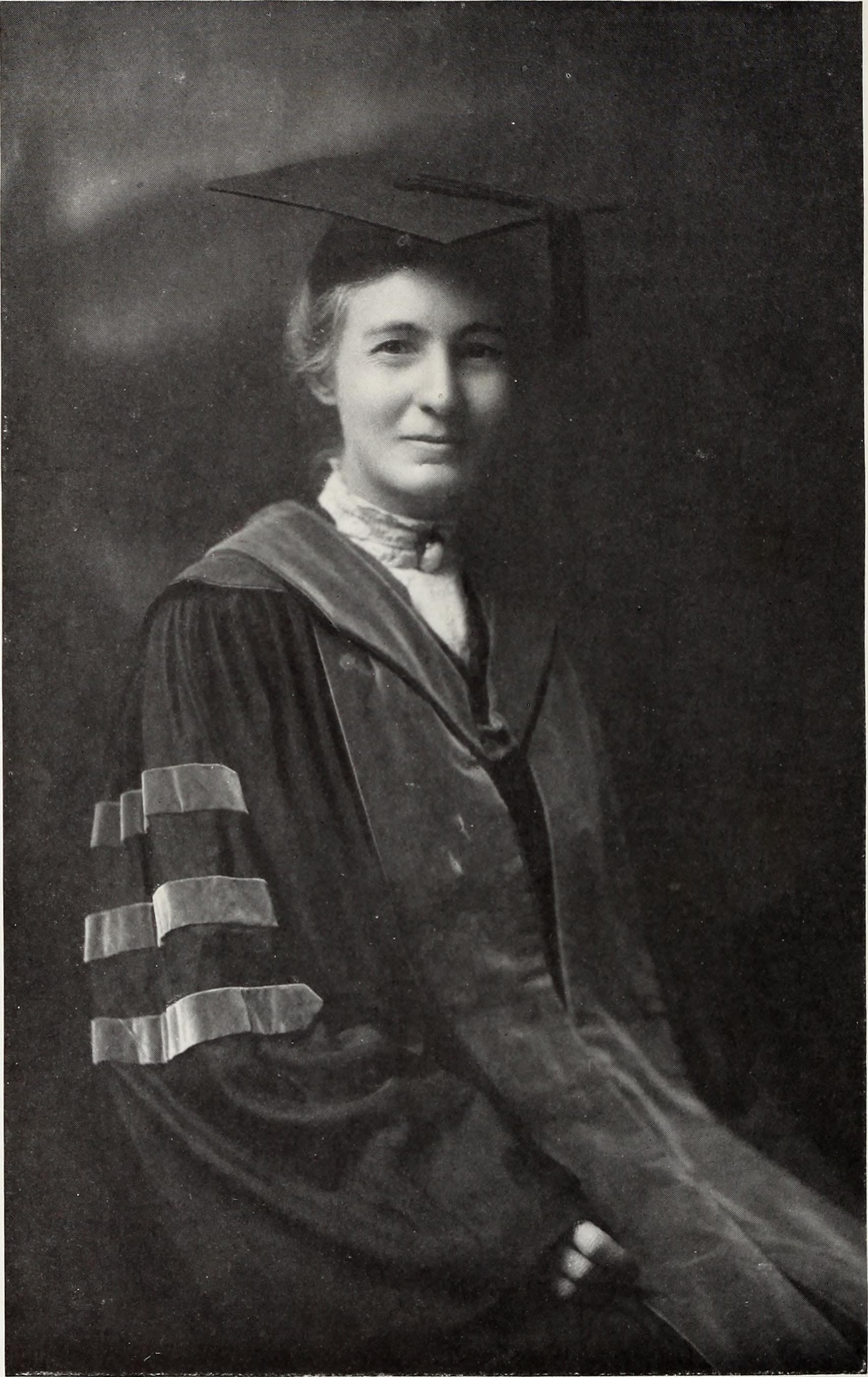
- Born: November 3, 1868; Newton, Mississippi, US
- Died: June 16, 1925 (aged 56); Waco, Texas, US
- Education: University of Chicago (PhD)

Lula Pace (1868–1925) was an American professor of biology and geology at Baylor University.

== Biography ==
Born in Newton, Mississippi, Lula was the daughter of William J. Pace and Olive L. Wilder. A year after her birth, the family settled in Bell County, Texas where she would attend public schools around the city of Temple. She matriculated to the recently relocated Baylor Female College in nearby Belton, along with her younger sisters Pearl and Annie, and was awarded a B.S. in 1890. Following her graduation, she taught in public schools in Temple while attending the University of Chicago during the Summer months. After nine years of study she graduated with an M.S. in 1902.

After spending the next academic year in residence at Chicago, in 1903 Pace joined the faculty of Baylor University as an assistant professor of biology. At the time, she was the only woman instructor in the university's science department, and one of only five at the school. She continued her Summer work at Chicago, earning a PhD in 1907 with a dissertation on plant cytology. Many of her graduate courses were completed via correspondence work, and she would later serve as director for correspondence learning at Baylor. She was the first female professor at the university to hold a PhD, and was promoted to the chair of the Baylor department of biology and geology.

During the 1910–1911 academic year, she took a sabbatical to study at the University of Bonn under Eduard Strasburger. In 1912, she was elected as a fellow of the AAAS. Between 1907 and 1913, five of her academic papers were published in the Botanical Gazette. Pace was popular with her students, who she took on field trips across central Texas, the Rocky Mountains, and even Yellowstone National Park.

A proponent of the progressive education methods, Pace believed in the theory of evolution and taught it in her classes. As a consequence, numerous letters of protest were written in testimony against her. In 1921, Baptist preacher J. Frank Norris found what he believed was a case of borderline heresy by Pace based on her assertion that, although she accepted Genesis, the language might be allegorical. He made bitter attacks against Pace and two others at Baylor, demanding that they resign. However, she was supported by the University President Samuel Palmer Brooks as well as the Waco community. Despite his ongoing attacks, she would remain at Baylor until her death in 1925.

== Bibliography ==
Her published works include:

- Pace, Lula (1906), "Nature-study and Biology: Biology in the Public Schools of Texas", Baylor University Bulletin, 9 (1), Baylor University: 32–35
- Pace, Lula (November 1907), "Fertilization in Cypripedium", Botanical Gazette, 44 (57): 353–374, doi:10.1086/329378, JSTOR 2466601, S2CID 85239215.
- Pace, L. (1909), "The gametophytes of Calopogon", Botanical Gazette, 48 (2): 126–137, doi:10.1086/329973, hdl:2027/mdp.39015069606641, JSTOR 2467020, S2CID 85208193
- Pace, L. (1910), "Some peculiar fern Prothallia", Botanical Gazette, 50 (1): 49–58, doi:10.1086/330274, JSTOR 2466920, S2CID 84931153
- Pace, L. (1912), "Parnassia and some allied genera", Botanical Gazette, 54 (4): 306–329, doi:10.1086/330918, JSTOR 2467867, S2CID 85137253
- Pace, L. (1913), "Apogamy in Atamosco", Botanical Gazette, 56 (5): 376–394, doi:10.1086/331182, JSTOR 2467792, S2CID 84651950
- Pace, L. (January 1914), "Two species of Gyrostachys", Baylor University Bulletin, 17 (1): 15
- Pace, L. (1921), Geology of McLennan County, Texas, Baylor University
- Pace, Lula (1923), A Few Texas Plants, Waco: Baylor University
