= James R. Heath =

American chemist

James R. Heath (born 1962) is an American chemist and the president and professor of Institute of Systems Biology. Previous to this, he was the Elizabeth W. Gilloon Professor of Chemistry at the California Institute of Technology, after having moved from University of California Los Angeles.

== Early years ==
Heath graduated with a degree in Chemistry in 1984 from Baylor University in Texas, where he was an active member of the NoZe Brotherhood. He completed his Ph.D. in Physics and Chemistry from Rice University in 1988.

== Academic career ==
From 1988 to 1991, he was a Miller Research Fellow at the Department of Chemistry, University of California, Berkeley. From 1991 to 1994, he was a Research Staff Member at IBM T.J. Watson Research Laboratory in Yorktown, New York. He joined the faculty at UCLA in 1994 and became Professor of Chemistry in 1997. He founded the California NanoSystems Institute in 2000 and served as its Director until moving to become the Elizabeth W. Gilloon Professor of Chemistry at Caltech.

== Research ==
Heath's academic work has focused on quantum phase transitions and developed architectures, devices, and circuits for molecular electronics. More recently, his work has moved towards applying expertise in nanoscale and molecular systems to addressing problems in cancer and infectious diseases.

When Heath was a graduate student at Rice University, he ran the experimental apparatus that generated the first C_{60} molecules and, ultimately, won the Nobel Prize in Chemistry for the three senior members of the collaboration: Robert F. Curl and Richard E. Smalley of Rice University and Harold Kroto of the University of Sussex. This research is significant for the discovery of a new allotrope of carbon known as a fullerene. Other allotropes of carbon include graphite, diamond and graphene. James R. Heath's 1985 paper entitled "C60: Buckminsterfullerene", published with colleagues Harry Kroto, S. C. O’Brien, R. F. Curl, and R. E. Smalley, was honored by a Citation for Chemical Breakthrough Award from the Division of History of Chemistry of the American Chemical Society, presented to Rice University in 2015. The discovery of fullerenes was recognized in 2010 by the designation of a National Historic Chemical Landmark by the American Chemical Society at the Richard E. Smalley Institute for Nanoscale Science and Technology at Rice University in Houston, Texas.

Heath is known for publishing an architecture demonstration of molecular computers, or moletronics. In moletronics, single molecules serve as switches, "quantum wires" a few atoms thick serve as wiring, and the hardware is synthesized chemically from the bottom up. It was published in the summer of 1999 by Heath, J. Fraser Stoddart (at the time at UCLA) and their collaborators in the journal Science.

As of 2011, Heath's research has split into one area devoted to solid-state quantum physics, materials science, and surface science, with a slight focus on energy conversion and another working on applying synthetic chemistry and a systems perspective to fundamental biology and translational medicine - with a clear focus on oncology.

== Awards and honours ==
Heath has received several awards and honours for his research. He was awarded the 2000 Feynman Prize in Nanotechnology. He became a fellow of American Physical Society in 1999. In 2009, Heath was named one of the seven most powerful innovators of the world by Forbes magazine.
