= Henry Lee Graves =

Henry Lee Graves (February 22, 1813 – November 4, 1881) was the president of Baylor University from 1846 to 1851.

== Biography ==
Henry Lee Graves, son of Thomas Graves, was born in Yanceyville, North Carolina in 1813. He married Rebecca Williams Graves on February 3, 1836. Rebecca, from Caswell County, North Carolina, was Graves's first cousin once-removed. Graves and Rebecca had four daughters (Mary Anna, Bettie Williams, Ophelia Florine, and Willie Ruby) as well as two sons (Charles Henry and Henry Lee). Rebecca died in 1865. Seven years later, Graves married Myra Lusk Crumpler, a wealthy widow who survived him by twenty-one years.

== Career ==
Graves attended the University of North Carolina and graduated in 1833. From 1835 to 1837, he served as the chair of mathematics at Wake Forest College, then taught at a Baptist high school in Covington, Georgia in 1838. In 1841, Graves attended the Hamilton Literary and Theological Institute in New York City. He returned to Georgia for a few years and served as a delegate at the Southern Baptist Convention of 1845 in Augusta, Georgia before leaving for Texas in 1846.

Graves became the first President of Baylor University, originally located in Independence while simultaneously serving as the pastor of the Independence Baptist Church. The newly founded Baylor University struggled financially, but Graves pressed on and established the departments of mathematics and classics and helped to erect a new building for the school. Baylor University grew to seventy students during his term as president. Graves also served as an officer in the Union Baptist Association, and as President of the Texas Baptist State Convention which he had helped to organize in 1848. He resigned his position as president of Baylor in June 1851 after five years of establishing a firm academic foundation for the school.

In addition to pastoring in Brenham and Schulenburg, Graves was head of the Fairfield Female Academy in Fairfield, Texas, from 1859 to 1868. He moved to Brenham in 1869 and returned to the Baylor community as president of Baylor Female College, still located in Independence, during the 1871–1872 academic year. Graves served as president of the Texas Baptist Education Society in 1872. He died in 1884, due to a carbuncle near his spinal column and is buried in Brenham, Texas.
