= Robert Roberts (footballer, born 1892) =

English footballer

Robert H. A. Roberts (1892–?) was an English footballer. His regular position was at full back. He was born in Earlestown, Lancashire. He played for Manchester United and Altrincham.
