= David VanHoose =

American economist

David Vanhoose (born 1957), is an economics professor at the Hankamer School of Business at Baylor University. He currently holds the Herman W. Lay Professor of Private Enterprise title. He has written numerous text books and papers which are widely used in the field of economics. His areas of focus are international economics, monetary economics, macroeconomics, and banking. He did his graduate studies at the University of North Carolina at Chapel Hill, with a dissertation in Bank Market Structure and Monetary Policy.

== Professional positions ==
- Co-editor for Journal of Macroeconomics, 2012–present
- Editor for Monetary Economics and editorial board member, Journal of Economics and Business, 1996–2008
- Baylor University - Professor
- University of Alabama - Professor
- Indiana University - Assistant Professor

== Books ==
- International Monetary & Financial Economics (2014) ISBN 978-0-132-46186-3
- E-Commerce Economics (2011, 2nd Edition) ISBN 978-0-415-77898-5
- Global Economic Issues and Policies (2011, 2nd Edition) with Joseph P. Daniels ISBN 978-0-415-57346-7
- The Industrial Organization of Banking (2010) ISBN 978-3-642-02820-5
- International Monetary and Financial Economics (2005, 3rd Edition) with Joseph P. Daniels ISBN 0-324-26160-8
- E-Commerce Economics (2003) ISBN 0-324-12880-0
- Money Banking and Financial Markets (2003) ISBN 0-324-15993-5
- Macroeconomics: Theory, Policies, and International Applications (2000) ISBN 0-324-00717-5
- Macroeconomics: Theory, Policy, and International Applications (1997) ISBN 0-538-87534-8

== Sources ==
- David VanHoose
