= Walter P. Paluch Jr. =

United States Air Force general

Walter P. Paluch Jr
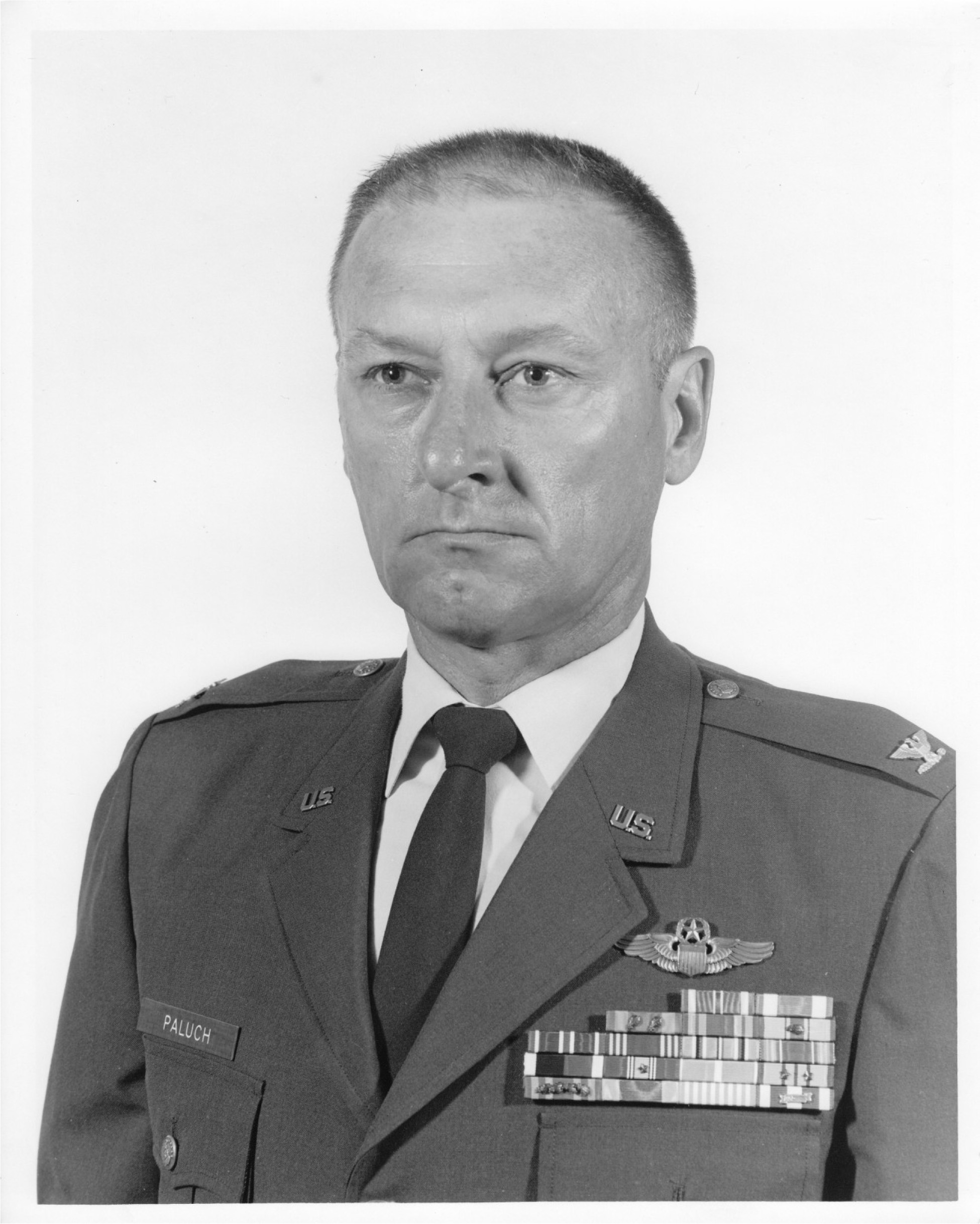
- Walter P. Paluch Jr., pictured as Colonel
- Born: April 20, 1927; Chicago, Illinois
- Died: March 10, 2011 (aged 83); Colorado Springs, Colorado
- Military career
- Allegiance: United States
- Branch: United States Air Force
- Service years: 1944–1975
- Rank: Brigadier general
- Commands: 4th Tactical Fighter Wing; 314th Air Division
- Wars: World War II; Korean War; Vietnam War
- Awards: Legion of Merit; Distinguished Flying Cross

Walter P. Paluch Jr. (April 20, 1927 – March 10, 2011) was a brigadier general in the United States Air Force.

Paluch was born in Chicago, Illinois. He would attend the University of Wisconsin–Madison and Baylor University.

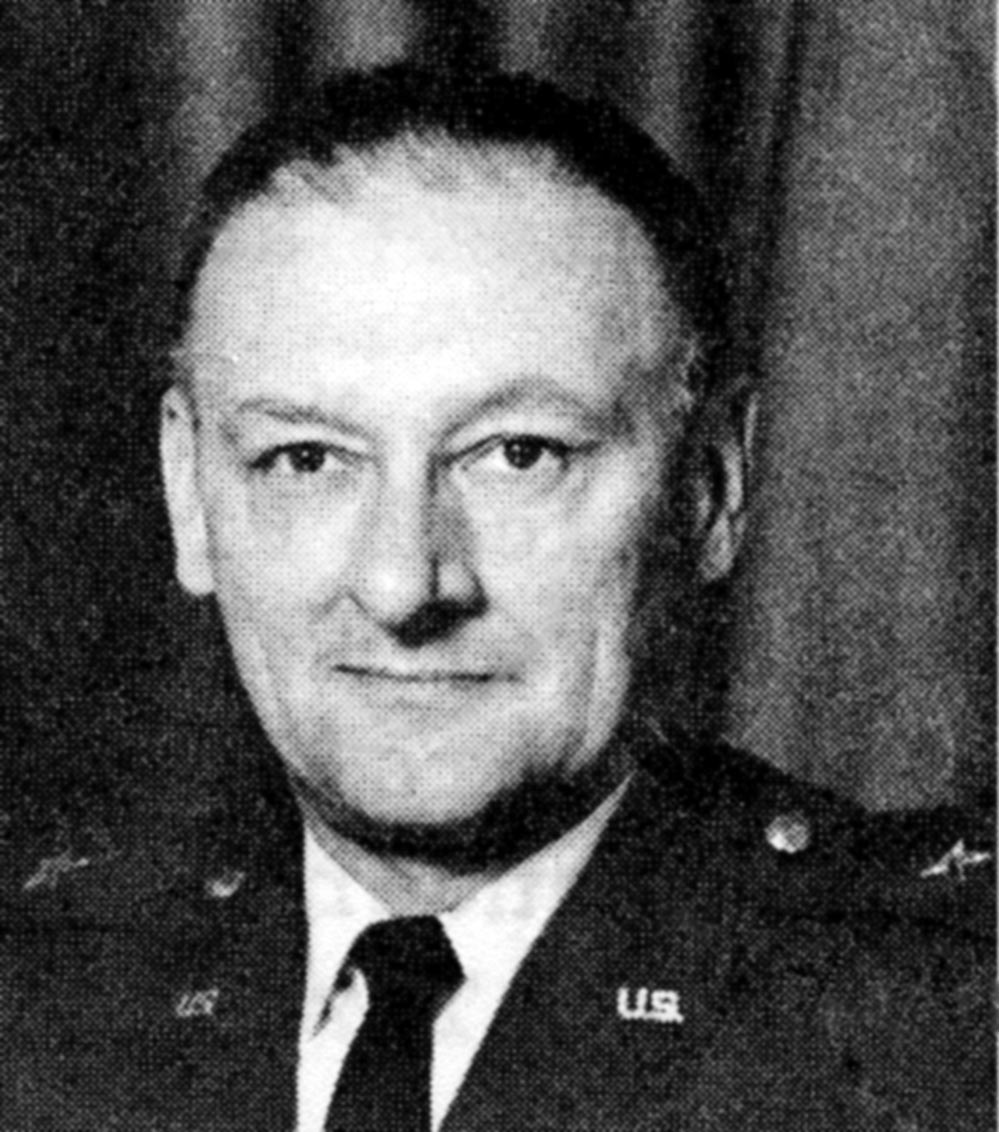
Paluch as Brigadier General

== Career ==
Paluch first enlisted in the United States Army Reserve in 1944 and was later called to active duty during the final months of World War II. Later he transferred to the Air Force and was commissioned an officer in 1949. After being stationed at Connally Air Force Base and Craig Air Force Base he was stationed overseas for eight months. Following his return to the United States he was assigned to Cannon Air Force Base before going overseas once again, this time to Toul-Rosières Air Base in France. In 1960 he entered the Air Command and Staff College. After graduating he was assigned to the 55th Tactical Fighter Squadron. He was given command of the squadron in 1963. In 1964 he was assigned to the officer of the Deputy Chief of Staff of the Air Force. He graduated from the National War College in 1968 and the following year served a tour of duty in the Vietnam War. Following his service in the war he was given command of the 4th Tactical Fighter Wing. In 1971 he was named Deputy Chief of Staff for Requirements of Tactical Air Command. From there he was named Vice Commander of the Twelfth Air Force before being given command of the 314th Air Division. Other positions he held during his career include acting as an adviser to the United Nations. His retirement was effective as of September 1, 1975.

Awards he received during his career include the Legion of Merit, the Distinguished Flying Cross, the Meritorious Service Medal, the Air Medal with two silver oak leaf clusters and two bronze oak leaf clusters, the Air Force Commendation Medal with oak leaf cluster, and the Outstanding Unit Award.
