= Journal of Macroeconomics =

- Language: English
- Edited by: William Lastrapes, David VanHoose, Ping Wang

Publication details
- History: 1979–present
- Publisher: Elsevier (United States)
- Frequency: Quarterly
- Impact factor: 1.746 (2020)

Standard abbreviations
- ISO 4: J. Macroecon.

Indexing
- ISSN: 0164-0704
- OCLC no.: 43555084

Links
- Journal homepage; Online access

The Journal of Macroeconomics is a peer-reviewed academic journal established in 1979 that covers research on a broad range of issues in monetary economics and macroeconomics, including economic growth, fluctuations, fiscal policy, and macroeconomic forecasting. The current editors are William D. Lastrapes, professor of economics at the University of Georgia; David VanHoose, professor of economics at Baylor University; and Ping Wang, professor of economics at Washington University in St. Louis.
