= Brooklyn and Bailey McKnight =

American YouTubers (born 1999)

- Born: December 31, 1999 (age 26); Utah, U.S.
- Years active: 2009–present
- Spouses: Bailey: Asa Howard (m. 2021); Brooklyn: Dakota Blackburn (m. 2022)
- Children: Brooklyn: 1

YouTube information
- Channel: BrooklynAndBailey
- Genres: Fashion; teen interests; DIY; vlogs; skits; pranks
- Subscribers: 7.4 million
- Views: 1.95 billion
- Last updated: April 10, 2026

Brooklyn Victoria McKnight and Bailey Marné McKnight-Howard (née McKnight; born December 31, 1999) are American identical twin YouTubers and social media personalities.

== Early life and education ==
Brooklyn Victoria McKnight and Bailey Marné McKnight-Howard were born on December 31, 1999 the eldest children of blogger Mindy and Shaun McKnight, a Mormon family. Their younger sister Kamri Noel McKnight is also a YouTuber.

In April 2018, they both announced that they were going to attend Baylor University in Waco, Texas, majoring in entrepreneurship. They signed a sponsorship deal to promote Baylor University while attending. They graduated a year early in May 2021. In April 2022, Brooklyn graduated as a Master Esthetician from the Skin Science Institute of Laser & Esthetics in Utah.

== Career ==
The twins launched their own YouTube channel, Brooklyn and Bailey, with a focus on teen interests, fashion, beauty, and "all things fun" in 2013. The twins were listed by Business Insider as one of "13 up-and-coming YouTube stars you should be following" in 2015. Their YouTube channel was nominated for a Streamy Award in the Fashion category.

In November 2015, the sisters launched Squared, a YouTube channel and daily web series described by Variety as being "dedicated to all things twins". Seven sets of twins from North America, the UK, and Australia contribute episodes to the series.

In early 2017, Brooklyn and Bailey announced their entrance into the music industry. The pair partnered with music producer Benny Cassette, and their first track, "Dance Like Me", debuted March 3, 2017. The track charted at #26 for most popular song and #12 for pop US song on iTunes. On April 28, 2017, the twins released their second single, "SiMPLE THiNGS". They released their third song "What We're Made Of" July 13, 2017. Brooklyn and Bailey had previously collaborated with Peter Hollens for a cover of Lennon and Maisy's "A Life That's Good Can Be Bad" in August 2015.

In 2017, the twins also launched their own merchandise line, and they were on Forbes list of Top Influencers – Kids. In 2017, the duo won a Streamy Award in the "Kids and Family" category at the 7th Streamy Awards. In 2018, they were finalists in the YouTube Musician category for the 10th Annual Shorty Awards. On May 16, 2018, the twins launched their own mascara line called Lash Next Door. The brand quickly added more products that originally focused mostly on hair accessories such as scrunchies and hairclips. The brand later expanded to focus on jewelry, fashion accessories and, following the successful launch of jackets in November 2019, expanded to mainly focus on clothing.

In February 2025, Brooklyn and Bailey collaborated with Saludi Glassware, a colored glassware company, to release a limited-edition collection of drinking glasses. The launch took place through Saludi’s website and sold out shortly after release. According to regional news coverage, the collection sold out within hours, leading to multiple restocks later in 2025, which also sold out. The collaboration was promoted through the twins’ social media platforms and marked an expansion of their product-based business ventures beyond beauty and fashion.

== Personal lives ==
Bailey: On October 1, 2021, Bailey married her longtime boyfriend Asa Howard. In 2026, Bailey and Asa came out about their struggles with fertility and IVF.

Brooklyn: On September 30, 2022, Brooklyn married boyfriend Dakota Blackburn. On January 24, 2025, a post shared on social media revealed that Brooklyn had given birth to a son, Archer. In October 2026, the couple announced that they are expecting their second child, later revealed to be a girl.
