= Kerry Shook =

American minister and author

- Church: Woodlands Church
- Installed: 1993

Personal details
- Born: Kerry Shook; November 6, 1962 (age 63) Russellville, Arkansas
- Denomination: Baptist (Southern Baptist Convention)
- Spouse: Chris
- Children: 4
- Occupation: Author, Pastor

Kerry Shook (born 1962) is an American minister and author, Senior Pastor of Woodlands Church in The Woodlands, Texas. In February 2008, Shook released One Month To Live: Thirty Days To A No Regrets Life, a book he wrote with his wife, Chris. The book became a New York Times Best Seller.

== Personal life and education ==
Born in 1962, Shook graduated from the Klein High School in Spring, Texas. He went on to graduate from Baylor University, located in Waco, Texas, and attended Southwestern Baptist Theological Seminary for less than a year, located in Fort Worth. He and his wife, Chris, have four children.

== Ministry ==
In October 1993, Shook founded The Woodlands Church, formerly Fellowship of The Woodlands, in The Woodlands. Texas. Since then, the congregation has grown to include campuses in Conroe (now closed), Tomball (now closed), Katy (now closed), and Atascosita (Atascocita, Texas), including the main campus located in The Woodlands. The Kingwood campus, combined with the main campus and online viewers, attract an average total of more than 15,000 individuals from all age groups.

In 2005, Shook began broadcasting his message on local television stations, beginning with KTBU channel in Houston. Other stations were quickly added, including KTLA, KIAH and DayStar Television Network. Today, Kerry Shook Ministries is a worldwide television ministry to a national and international audience, with broadcasts reaching all 50 states in the U.S. and over 200 countries worldwide.

In February 2008, Shook became a best-selling author when One Month to Live: 30 Days to a No-Regrets Life was released. Shook co-wrote the book with his wife, Chris. The book challenges readers to "embrace life and live it out moment by moment with whole-hearted authenticity, honesty and integrity."

In November 2018, CBS News listed Woodlands Church as the 18th largest megachurch in the United States with about 18,385 weekly visitors.

== Teaching style ==
Shook is noted for his innovative attempts to address topics that are relevant to daily living in a style designed to make church services "The Best Hour of Your Week." Shook's messages typically emphasize relationships with God, values, priorities, and the importance of leaving a lasting legacy.
