= James R. Norvell =

American judge (1902–1969)

James Rankin Norvell (September 24, 1902 – October 21, 1969) was a justice of the Supreme Court of Texas from January 1, 1957, to October 10, 1968.

Political offices
Preceded by Abner V. McCall	Justice of the Texas Supreme Court; 1957–1968	Succeeded by Thomas M. Reavley
