= Rod Rohrich =

American plastic surgeon (born 1953)

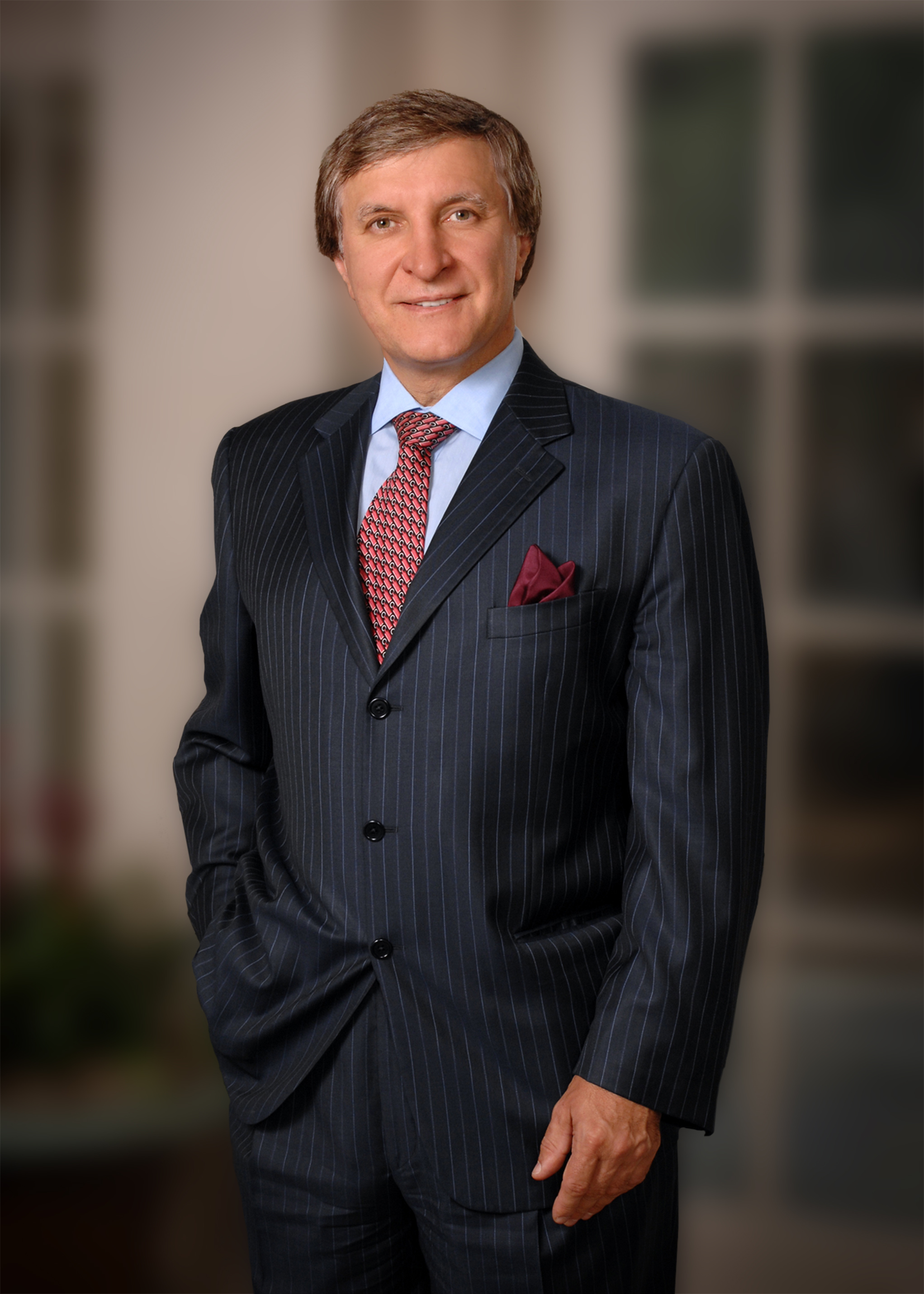
- Born: August 5, 1953 (age 73)
- Occupation: Plastic surgeon
- Employer: Dallas Plastic Surgery Institute
- Known for: Dallas Rhinoplasty and Navigate Your Beauty

Rod J. Rohrich (/ˈrɔːrɪk/ RAW-rik), F.A.C.S. is a Dallas-based plastic surgeon, author and educator. He is former the editor-in-chief of the journal Plastic and Reconstructive Surgery, a founding member of the Dallas Plastic Surgery Institute, a founder of the Alliance in Reconstructive Surgery, Chair of the Dallas Rhinoplasty and Cosmetic Meeting, and has served as President of the American Society of Plastic Surgeons among other honors.

Dr. Rohrich is board certified by the American Board of Plastic Surgery. A June 2014 journal article in Annals of Plastic Surgery recognized Rohrich as one of the "10 most influential surgeons of the current era" after surveying the American Council of Academic Plastic Surgeons (ACAPS) and the Southeastern Society of Plastic and Reconstructive Surgeons (SESPRS). From 2021 to 2026, Newsweek recognized Dr. Rohrich as the top ranked plastic surgeon in the United States for both rhinoplasty surgery and facelift surgery.

== Early life and education ==
Rohrich grew up in rural North Dakota. He completed his undergraduate and postgraduate education at North Dakota State University and the University of North Dakota, then earned his medical degree from Baylor College of Medicine. After general surgery and plastic surgery residencies at the University of Michigan Medical Center, he did further training in pediatric plastic surgery at Oxford University in England, and a hand and microvascular fellowship at Massachusetts General Hospital/Harvard Medical School.

== Career ==
Rohrich joined the Division of Plastic Surgery at UT Southwestern Medical Center in Dallas in 1986 and succeeded Fritz E. Barton as department chair in 1991. In 2003 he was elected president of the American Society of Plastic Surgeons for the year 2004. In 2005, Rohrich was appointed editor-in-chief of the journal, Plastic & Reconstructive Surgery.

Rohrich was chairman of the UT-Southwestern plastic surgery department when it became the largest plastic surgery department in the country, and helped to open an outpatient plastic surgery clinic. Until 2014, Rohrich was one of highest paid state employees in Texas as a University of Texas Southwestern Medical Center faculty member. He stepped down as chairman of the Department of Plastic Surgery at UT Southwestern Medical Center after "an allegation of unprofessional conduct." In 2016, he resigned from UT Southwestern Medical Center, and started working full time at the Dallas Plastic Surgery Institute of which he was a founding member.

He is a clinical professor of plastic surgery at the Baylor College of Medicine and has been the president of the Association of Academic Chairs of Plastic Surgery, The Rhinoplasty Society, the Dallas Society of Plastic Surgeons, the Texas Society of Plastic Surgeons, as well as a chair on the Residency Review Committee for Plastic Surgery and American Board of Plastic Surgery.

Dr. Rohrich has been ranked as the top plastic surgeon in the United states by Newsweek in various surgical specialties. He was ranked number 1 in rhinoplasty from 2021 to 2026, and also ranked number 1 in facelift surgery from 2021 to 2026. Rohrich has been recognized as one of the top plastic surgeons in the United States by Castle Connolly's Top Doctor Program for over two decades.

He is author or coauthor of 900 scientific articles, 50 textbook chapters in plastic surgery, and editor of 5 plastic surgery textbooks or monographs.

In October 2026, Retraction Watch published an investigation into Rohrich's research on exosome-based skin and hair care products and his consulting relationship with Rion.

== Selected bibliography ==
- Rohrich, Rod J; Stuzin, James; Dayan, Erez; Ross, Edward (2019). Facial Danger Zones: Staying safe with surgery, fillers, and non-invasive devices. Thieme. ISBN 9781684200030. OCLC 1684200032.
- Rohrich, Rod J (2018). The Dallas rhinoplasty and Dallas cosmetic surgery dissection guide. Thieme. ISBN 9781626239920. OCLC 1019834107.
- Rohrich, Rod J; Ahmad, Jamil (2017). Secondary rhinoplasty by the global masters. Vol. 1. CRC Press/Taylor & Francis. ISBN 9781482255782. OCLC 1028712157.
- Rohrich, Rod J; Adams Jr, William P; Ahmad, Jamil (2014). Rhinoplasty: Nasal Surgery by the Masters. pp. 1706.
- Pessa, Joel E; Rohrich, Rod J (2014). Facial topography: clinical anatomy of the face. ISBN 9781498716796. OCLC 896909610.
- Rohrich, Rod J; Crosland, Mary (2014). Navigate your beauty: smart and safe surgical solutions. BusinessGhost, Incorporated. ISBN 9781939758422. OCLC 1011806748.
- Rohrich, Rod J; Beran, Samuel J; Kenkel, Jeffrey M (1998). Ultrasound assisted liposuction Video. Quality Medical Publishing, Incorporated. ISBN 1576261107. OCLC 1068744552.
- Rohrich, Rod J; Sheen, Jack H; Burget, Gary (1996). Secondary rhinoplasty and nasal reconstruction. Quality Medical. ISBN 9780942219807. OCLC 38312551.
