= William Cowper Brann =

American journalist

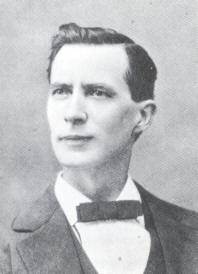
- Born: January 4, 1855; Humboldt, Illinois, US
- Died: April 2, 1898 (aged 43); Waco, Texas, U.S.
- Cause of death: Assassination by gunshot
- Occupation: Journalist
- Spouse: Carrie Belle Martin
- Children: 3

William Cowper Brann (January 4, 1855 – April 2, 1898) was an American journalist also known as Brann the Iconoclast. During his life, he gained a reputation as a "brilliant though vitriolic editorialist." He defended lynching Black men accused of rape and called for opponents of this type of mob violence to be castrated.

== Early life ==
The son of Presbyterian minister Noble J. Brann, he was born in Humboldt, Illinois. When his mother died in 1857, he was sent by his father to live with William and Mary Hawkins, where he stayed until 1868. That year, he ran away from home and took odd jobs in several cities, including working as a painter's helper, a bellboy at a hotel, manager of an opera company, a pitcher in semiprofessional baseball, and a fireman and brakeman on a locomotive.

A job in a print shop turned Brann's interest toward journalism, and he became a cub reporter. As his career progressed, he worked in St. Louis, Galveston, Houston, and San Antonio. While in Rochelle, Illinois in 1877, he married Carrie Belle Martin, with whom he had one son and two daughters.

== Career ==
During the 1880s, Brann began to take his career in journalism seriously and traveled around the country working for several significant newspapers, including the St. Louis Globe-Democrat, the Galveston Evening Tribune, and the Galveston News. At the same time, Brann registered three plays with the Library of Congress: Cleon, That American Woman, and Retribution. Despite his growing success, Brann's family was shaken by the suicide of his 12e-year-old daughter Inez in 1890, which greatly agonized Brann. Brann coped with this tragedy and was inspired to continue to strive towards a successful career in writing and journalism.

In 1891, only one year after his daughter's death, Brann moved to Austin, Texas, to write for the Austin Statesman. After only a short time, however, he decided to attempt to write his own paper and invested a significant amount of his personal savings into the Iconoclast. That paper quickly failed, and Brann went back to working for other Texas newspapers, the San Antonio Express and the Houston Post.

=== Waco Iconoclast ===
In 1894, Brann moved to Waco, Texas, to become an editor with the Waco Daily News. By February 1895, he had decided to attempt to revive the Iconoclast, and this time, the paper was successful, with a circulation nearing 100,000 people. With this new platform to communicate his views, Brann quickly became known for his stinging, often hateful attacks on various groups that drew his ire, including Baptists, Episcopalians, the British, blacks, and Baylor University. Brann attacked perceived hypocrisy from the Baptists with his seething prose, saying, "I have nothing against the Baptists. I just believe they were not held under long enough". He devoted many paragraphs to his hatred of the wealthy eastern social elites, such as the Vanderbilt family, and deplored their marriages to titled Europeans. He characterized such marriages as diluting the elites' already-debased American stock with worthless foreign blood. He was equally critical of the New York social scene.

Baylor University, the prominent Baptist institution in Waco, drew constant criticism from Brann. He set off a scandal with allegations that Baylor President Rufus Burleson's son-in-law's brother Steen Morris, who lived with the Burleson family, had impregnated a student from Brazil. He alleged that male faculty members were having sexual relations with female students and any father sending his daughter to Baylor would be risking her rape. In Brann's view, Baylor was, as he published, "A factory for the manufacture of ministers and magdalenes." Brann's constant attacks on the university enraged many of its supporters, and on October 2, 1897, he was kidnapped by Baylor students, who demanded that he retract his statements. Four days later, Brann was beaten by three men, including a local Baptist judge, who were angry that he had not left town.

== Legacy and death ==
On April 1, 1898, Brann was walking alone on Waco's Fourth Street when he was shot in the back by Tom Davis, a Baylor supporter whose daughter was a student at the university. After being shot, Brann turned, drew his pistol, and fired multiple shots at Davis, who fell, mortally wounded, in the doorway of the Jake French Cigar Store. Brann was shot through the left lung, with the bullet exiting his chest. He was forced to walk to the city jail, but later escorted home by friends. Both Davis and Brann died the next day. Brann is buried in Oakwood Cemetery, Waco. Engraved on Brann's monument is the word "TRUTH", and beneath it is a profile of Brann with a bullet hole in it. Brann remains a controversial figure to this day.

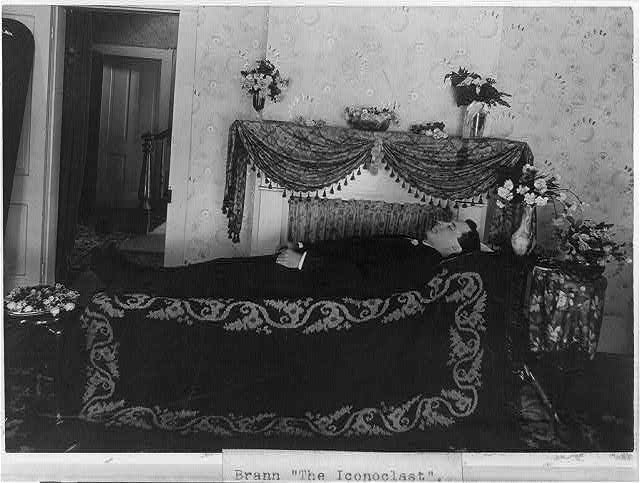
Brann at a funeral parlor

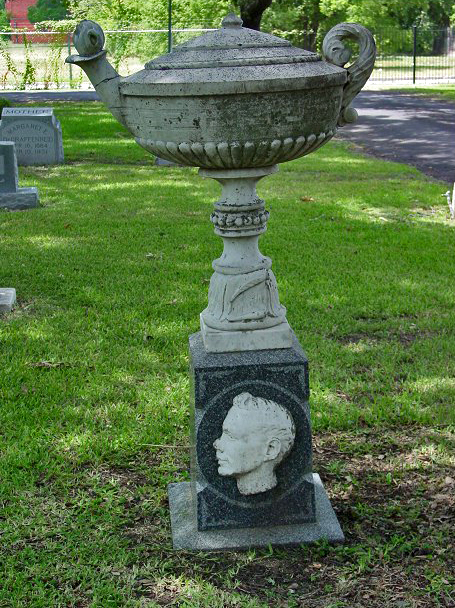
Brann's tombstone in Oakwood Cemetery, Waco, Texas

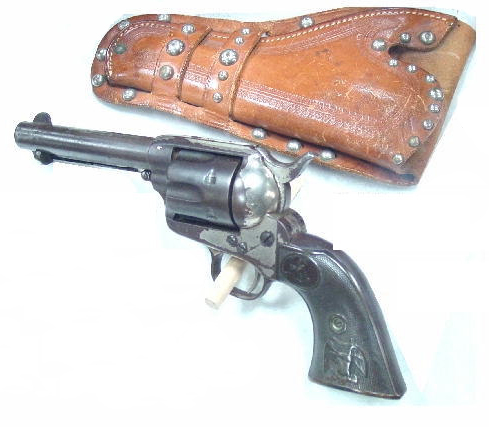
Colt Single Action Army revolver owned by Judge Gerald and lent to W.C. Brann, who used it in his street duel with Davis, Redmen Museum, Waco Texas

== Personal life ==
Brann married Carrie Belle Martin on March 3, 1877, in Rochelle, Illinois. They had three children. Their daughter, Inez, died at age 12 following a confrontation with her father regarding the attentions of a young boy who left flowers at the house for Inez, whom Brann accused of encouraging the boy's interest. Her denial led him to accuse her of lying. The next morning, her mother and father found her dead after she had taken morphine. She left a note that said, in part, "I don’t want to live. I could never be as good as you want me to.”

== Papers ==
Brann's papers are housed at the Harry Ransom Center of the University of Texas at Austin.

== Works ==
- The Complete Works of Brann the Iconoclast. New York: Brann Publishers, 1919.

Vol. 1 | Vol. 2 | Vol. 3 | Vol. 4 | Vol. 5 | Vol. 6 | Vol. 7 | Vol. 8 | Vol. 9 | Vol. 10 | Vol. 11 | Vol. 12

== See also ==
- List of journalists killed in the United States
- Censorship in the United States
- Rufus Columbus Burleson
