= Anzhong Wang =

Anzhong Wang is a theoretical physicist who specializes in gravitation, cosmology and astroparticle physics. He is on the Physics faculty of Baylor University.

== Publications ==
Wang has written over 100 research articles in scholarly journals on topics in gravitational theory, cosmology, string theory and high-energy astrophysics.

Some recent publications are

- Cai, Rong-Gen; Wang, Anzhong (2005-03-10). "Cosmology with interaction between phantom dark energy and dark matter and the coincidence problem". Journal of Cosmology and Astroparticle Physics. 2005 (3): 002. arXiv:hep-th/0411025. Bibcode:2005JCAP...03..002C. doi:10.1088/1475-7516/2005/03/002. ISSN 1475-7516. S2CID 349760.
- Cai, Rong-Gen; Zhang, Hong-Sheng; Wang, An-Zhong (2005). "Crossing w = −1 in Gauss–Bonnet Brane World with Induced Gravity". Communications in Theoretical Physics. 44 (5): 948–954. arXiv:hep-th/0505186. Bibcode:2005CoTPh..44..948C. doi:10.1088/6102/44/5/948. ISSN 0253-6102. S2CID 250812084.
- Gong, Yungui; Wang, Anzhong (2007-02-23). "Reconstruction of the deceleration parameter and the equation of state of dark energy". Physical Review D. 75 (4) 043520. arXiv:astro-ph/0612196. Bibcode:2007PhRvD..75d3520G. doi:10.1103/physrevd.75.043520. ISSN 1550-7998. S2CID 30744353.
- Wang, Anzhong; Wu, Yumei (2009-07-07). "Thermodynamics and classification of cosmological models in the Horava–Lifshitz theory of gravity". Journal of Cosmology and Astroparticle Physics. 2009 (7): 012. arXiv:0905.4117. Bibcode:2009JCAP...07..012W. doi:10.1088/1475-7516/2009/07/012. ISSN 1475-7516. S2CID 118684099.
- Wu, Qiang; Gong, Yungui; Wang, Anzhong; Alcaniz, J.S. (2008). "Current constraints on interacting holographic dark energy". Physics Letters B. 659 (1–2): 34–39. arXiv:0705.1006. Bibcode:2008PhLB..659...34W. doi:10.1016/j.physletb.2007.10.061. ISSN 0370-2693. S2CID 119317806.
- Gong, Yungui; Wang, Anzhong (2007-11-20). "Friedmann Equations and Thermodynamics of Apparent Horizons". Physical Review Letters. 99 (21) 211301. arXiv:0704.0793. Bibcode:2007PhRvL..99u1301G. doi:10.1103/physrevlett.99.211301. ISSN 0031-9007. PMID 18233205. S2CID 22134864.
- Wang, Anzhong; Maartens, Roy (2010-01-13). "Cosmological perturbations in Horava–Lifshitz theory without detailed balance". Physical Review D. 81 (2) 024009. arXiv:0907.1748. Bibcode:2010PhRvD..81b4009W. doi:10.1103/physrevd.81.024009. ISSN 1550-7998. S2CID 56273289.

== Honors ==
Wang received the Outstanding Researcher Award in May 2009 from Baylor University and is a member of the editorial board of Universe.
