= William R. White (academic administrator) =

William Richardson White (December 2, 1892 – March 24, 1977) was the President of Hardin-Simmons University from 1940 to 1943, and of Baylor University from 1948 to 1961.

== Biography ==
In 1913, he attended Baylor University, but he transferred to Howard Payne College and graduated in 1917. In 1924, he received a Ph.D. from Southwestern Baptist Theological Seminary. He taught there for three more years. He served as a Baptist pastor at the First Baptist Church at Greenville and the First Baptist Church of Lubbock. He next served as executive secretary of the Baptist General Convention of Texas. He then pastored at Broadway Baptist Church, Fort Worth and the First Baptist Church of Oklahoma City. From 1940 to 1943, he was the President of Hardin-Simmons University. He then served as Editorial Secretary of the Baptist Sunday School Board of the Southern Baptist Convention in Nashville, Tennessee, and later pastored at the First Baptist Church of Austin. From 1948 to 1961, he served as President of Baylor University. He was a Mason.
