= Frank Carney (geologist) =

American geologist (1868 – 1934)

Frank Carney (March 15, 1868, Watkins, New York – December 13, 1934, Waco, Texas) was an American geologist who was professor of geology and geography at Baylor University. He is known for his work on glaciers, as well as economic geology, physiography and geography.

He graduated from the Starkey Seminary in Eddytown, New York in 1887. He studied at Cornell University from 1891 to 1895. In 1909, he earned a PhD from Cornell.

From 1904 to 1917, he was professor of geology at Denison University. In 1917, he became chief geologist at the National Refining Company in Texas. From 1928 to 1929, he taught geology at Texas Christian University. In 1930, he became chairman of the department of Geology and Geography at Baylor University. Under his tenure, it became the largest department at Baylor University.
