= Magnolia Market =

American shopping complex

- Retail store at Magnolia Market Complex, Waco, TX
- Alternative names: Magnolia Market at the Silos

General information
- Type: Retail complex
- Address: 601 Webster Avenue, Waco, Texas, United States 76706
- Coordinates: 31°33′9.734″N 97°7′47.179″W
- Opening: October 30, 2015; 9 years ago
- Cost: US$1,400,000
- Owner: Magnolia Market, LLC

Technical details
- Floor area: 20,000 sq ft (1,900 m^{2})

Other information
- Number of stores: 3
- Number of restaurants: Variable number of food trucks
- Parking: On site surface lot, street parking, nearby surface lots

Website
- magnolia.com/silos/

Magnolia Market at the Silos, commonly called Magnolia Market, is a shopping complex that encompasses two city blocks in downtown Waco, Texas. It is marked by two 120’ high silos, built in 1950 as part of the Brazos Valley Cotton Oil Company. The Brazos Valley Cotton Oil Mill Company closed in 1958, and the silos ceased to serve as storage in the 1990s. The grounds opened to the public in October, 2015. The complex is owned by Chip and Joanna Gaines, TV personalities best known for HGTV's Fixer Upper TV series. The Gaineses completely transformed the Waco landmark, which helped to change the city as well as many surrounding areas.

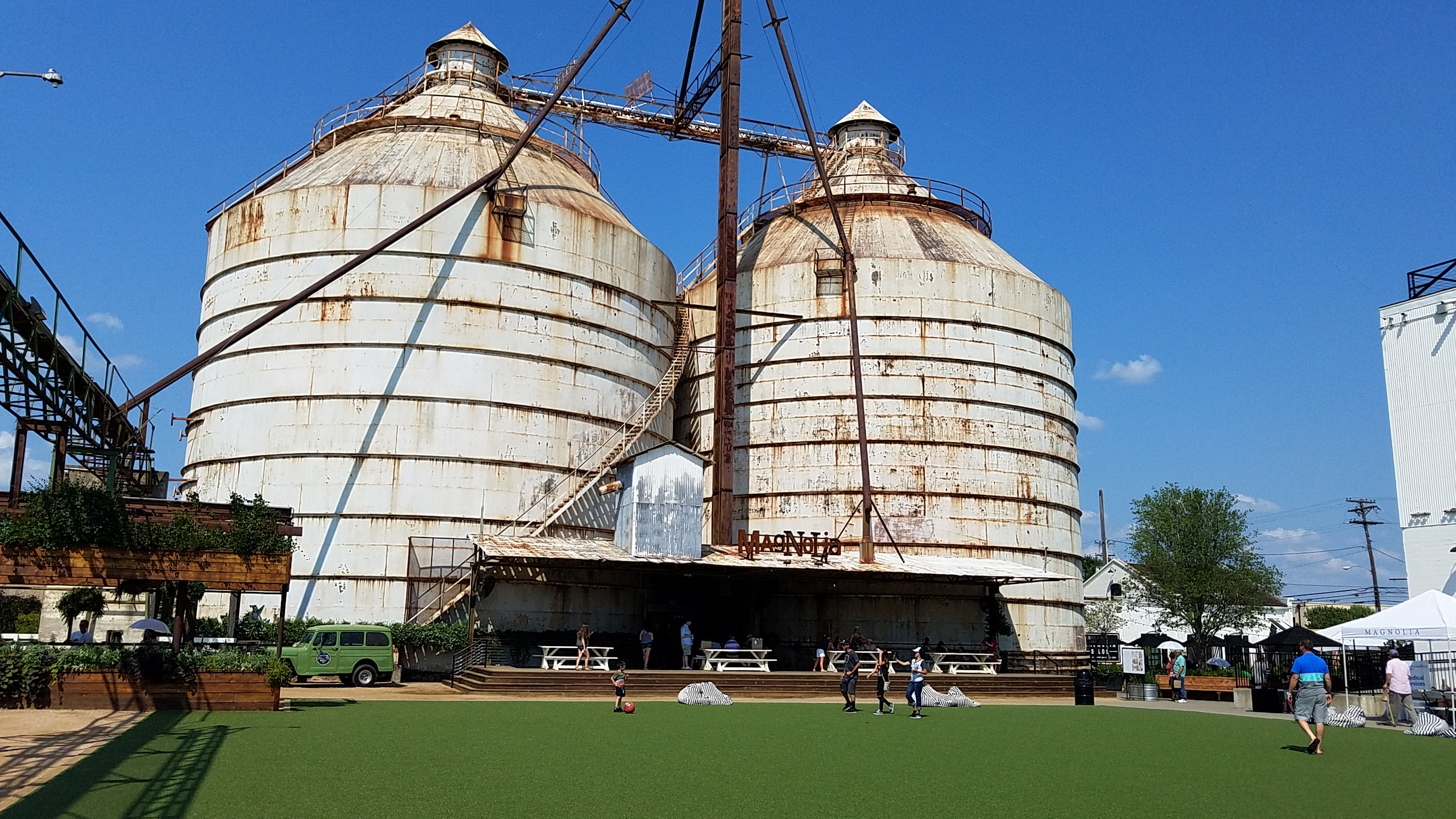
The Silos, Waco, TX

The grounds include a 12,000 sq. ft. retail store located in the historic grain barn and office building, a food truck park with picnic tables, a garden store, bakery, and lawn area. Admission to the grounds is free except during special events.

Magnolia Market reported an estimated 1.2 million visitors through November 2016. Attendance at the nearby Dr. Pepper Museum increased by more than 60% because of Magnolia Market's popularity. Special events are held regularly at the complex, including Spring at the Silos (March), Silobration (October), and Christmas at the Silos. Events include concerts, vendor booths, and other activities.

In 2019, it was announced that Magnolia Market is undergoing a $10.4 million expansion. The expansion plans include adding new shops and public spaces to the two-block area anchored by the Silos. Attractions include a wiffle ball field, more shops, and gardens, as well as the relocation of the historic Waco Church to the 4.9-acre site. Magnolia Market Complex already draws an estimated 30,000 visitors per week.
