= Robert Campbell Roberts =

American philosopher (born 1942)

- Born: 1942 (age 83–84)

Philosophical work
- Era: 21st-century philosophy
- Region: Western philosophy
- School: Analytic
- Institutions: Baylor University
- Main interests: ethical theory
- Website: http://www.robertcroberts.net/

Robert Campbell Roberts (born 1942) is an American philosopher and distinguished professor emeritus of ethics at Baylor University. Previously he was a professor of philosophy at Western Kentucky University (1973–1984), and professor of philosophy and psychological studies at Wheaton College (1984–2000). After retirement from Baylor in 2015, he occupied the Chair of Ethics and Emotion Theory in the Jubilee Centre, University of Birmingham UK until 2017, with a joint Chair in the Royal Institute of Philosophy.

Roberts’s published work is mostly in philosophical moral psychology with special interest in the moral import of affective states such as concerns, desires, emotions, and attention. In 1984 he published “Will Power and the Virtues” (Philosophical Review), arguing that some virtues are skills, and in 1988 “What An Emotion Is: A Sketch” (Philosophical Review), arguing that emotions are concern-based construals, a kind of concern-laden “seeing as.” He elaborated this account of emotions in his 2003 book, Emotions: An Essay in Aid of Moral Psychology (Cambridge U.P.). In 2013 he developed this view further in explicit reference to moral psychology in Emotions in the Moral Life (Cambridge U.P.). The farther aim of these two books was to prepare the way for an account of the human virtues, which he published in Attention to Virtues: An Affective Grammar (Cambridge U. P.) These three books form a trilogy on affective moral psychology. In 2007, in collaboration with William J. Wood, an epistemologist, Roberts co-published Intellectual Virtues: An Essay in Regulative Epistemology(Oxford U.P.). Roberts’s and Wood’s account of intellectual humility has received attention from philosophers and psychologists. Roberts has also been interested in the nature of ethics as a philosophical discipline, and has advocated a virtue-focused approach, which he distinguishes sharply from most of contemporary virtue ethics. Virtue Ethics in Christian Perspective (Cascade, 2024) and Virtue Ethics: An Introduction, A Proposal, and a Case (Oxford, 2026) are representative.

Roberts has sustained an interest in the works of Søren Kierkegaard and has published two books (1986 and 2022) and nineteen papers in journals and collections on Kierkegaard’s writings.

Roberts’s work has had a theological dimension. In 2007 he published Spiritual Emotions: A Psychology of Christian Virtues (Wm. B. Eerdmans), and in his latest Oxford book, the “case” is a Christian and biblical virtue ethics.

Roberts’s move to Baylor in 2001 was part of a transition of the University from being primarily a teaching institution in the Baptist tradition serving a mostly Texas population to being a research university while retaining and strengthening its Christian character. Robert B. Sloan, then president, and provost Don Schmeltekopf instigated the transition, and they enlisted Roberts to write “Vision 2012,” the statement of what they wished Baylor to become. Under the leadership of Robert Baird, chair of the philosophy department, Baylor’s PhD program was established in 2003.
