= Samuel Palmer Brooks =

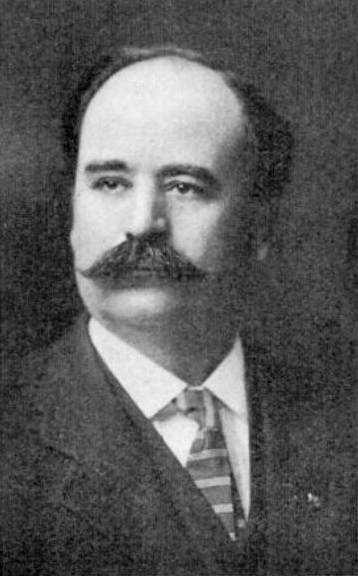
- Born: December 4, 1863; Milledgeville, Georgia, US
- Died: May 14, 1931 (aged 67); Waco, Texas, US
- Education: Baylor University; Yale University
- Occupation: Educator
- Spouse: Mattie Sims (m. 1895)
- Children: 2

Samuel Palmer Brooks (December 4, 1863 – May 14, 1931) was the President of Baylor University from 1902 to 1931.

== Biography ==
Samuel Palmer Brooks was born in Milledgeville, Georgia on December 4, 1863. He graduated with a B.A. from Baylor University in 1893, and from Yale University in 1894.

He married Mattie Sims in 1895, and they had two children.

At Baylor, he roomed with later Governor of Texas Pat Morris Neff. He taught History at Baylor, then received an M.A. from Yale in 1902. From 1902 to 1931, he served as President of Baylor University, and was responsible for the restarting of the Baylor Law School, formation of the Baylor College of Dentistry, the Baylor College of Medicine, and the Texas Baptist Sanitarium which later became Baylor University Medical Center in Dallas, Texas. Enrollment nearly quadrupled during his presidency, from 783 students in 1902 to 3,039 in 1930.

In 1916, he organized the Texas Association of Colleges, and served on the Texas State Teachers Association in 1901 and 1919. He served as secretary of the Texas Baptist Education Commission in 1905, president of the Baptist General Convention of Texas from 1914 to 1917, and vice-president of the Southern Baptist Convention in 1910 and 1917. He was vice-president of the Texas State Peace Society and organized the Texas State Peace Congress in 1907, of which he was president until 1915.

He received honorary degrees from Richmond College in 1903, Mercer University in Macon, Georgia, in 1922, Austin College in Sherman, Texas, in 1924, and Georgetown College in Georgetown, Kentucky in 1929. He was a Mason, a trustee of the Southern Baptist Theological Seminary, and a member of the Southern Baptist Education Association.

Brooks died from cancer in Waco, Texas on May 14, 1931. His papers are housed at The Texas Collection at Baylor University.
