= Rufus Columbus Burleson =

American Baptist preacher and president of Baylor University (1823–1901)

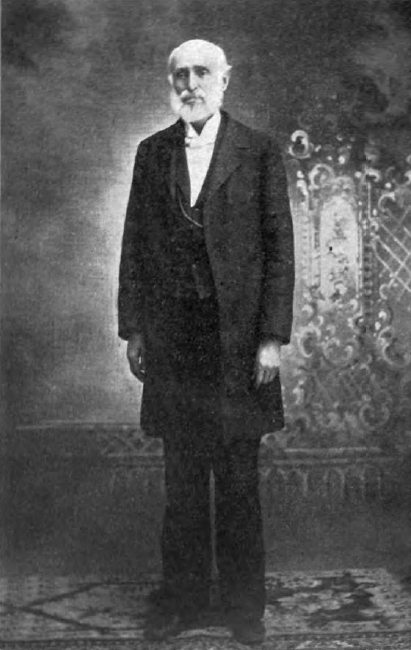
Rufus C. Burleson

Rufus Columbus Burleson (August 7, 1823 – May 14, 1901) was the president of Baylor University in Waco, Texas, from 1851 to 1861 and again from 1886 to 1897.

== Biography ==
Burleson was born near Decatur in northern Alabama. His family was of Welsh descent. In 1840, he moved to Nashville, Tennessee, to study law at the University of Nashville but dropped out and started preaching at the First Baptist Church of Nashville. He fell ill in 1841, and taught in Mississippi until 1845. From 1846 to 1847, he attended the Western Baptist Literary and Theological Institute in Covington, Kentucky. He then preached at the First Baptist Church of Houston, Texas. On November 19, 1854, he baptized Sam Houston.

He served as the second president of Baylor University from 1851 to 1861. He moved to Waco University, later merged with Baylor, because of friction with Horace Clark, and he became its president. He was again President of Baylor from 1886 to 1897. In 1894, a boarder at his home accused H. Steen Morris (no relation to Burleson) of having committed a sexual assault. Burleson was accused by William Cowper Brann of having some knowledge of this, and thus, complicit, but Burleson was cleared by a grand jury and the accused, H. Steen Morris, was acquitted. The scandal likely contributed to his demotion to president emeritus in 1897 despite being cleared of criminal charges by a grand jury.

He was president of the Baptist General Convention of Texas from 1892 to 1893. He was asked in 1869 by Barnas Sears, a former president of Brown University in Providence, Rhode Island, to establish the Peabody Education Fund. He also helped establish Bishop College, an historically black institution originally in Marshall, Texas, but later moved to Dallas.

Burleson died in Waco in 1901. He is buried in Oakwood Cemetery, Waco, Texas. The suburban city of Burleson in Johnson County south of Fort Worth, Texas, is named in his honor. So was Burleson College in Greenville, Texas.

== Legacy ==
June 7 of 1905, four years after Burleson's death, a statue in his image was unveiled. Standing about seven feet tall, the statue created by Signor Pompeo Coppini, can still be found in Burleson Quadrangle, which is also named after the past President of Baylor University. The $4000.00 statue was purchased by the Baylor Alumni Association and consists of bronze for the sculpture with a base of pink and blue granite on a concrete foundation. In 2020, Baylor founded the Commission on Historic Campus representations. The Commission's first report uncovered the prejudiced past of Rufus Burleson and included the recommendation to move his statue and rename Burleson Quadrangle to The Quadrangle. Burleson's statue was moved from its place of prominence in the summer of 2022.

Burleson was a second cousin of Edward Burleson, third vice president of the Republic of Texas.
