= Pat Morris Neff =

Governor of Texas from 1921 to 1925 (1871–1952)

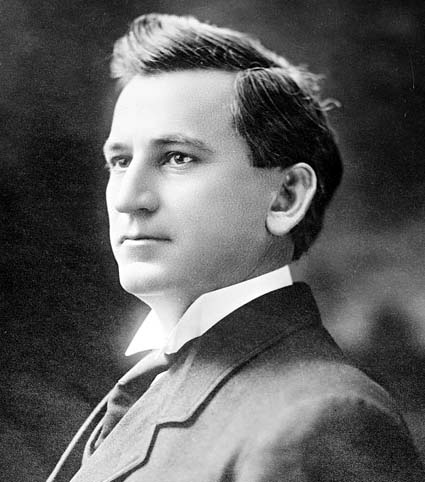

28th Governor of Texas
- In office January 18, 1921 – January 20, 1925
- Lieutenant: Lynch Davidson; Thomas Whitfield Davidson
- Preceded by: William P. Hobby
- Succeeded by: Miriam A. Ferguson

Railroad Commissioner of Texas
- In office January 1, 1929 – January 1, 1933
- Governor: Dan Moody; Ross S. Sterling
- Preceded by: Clarence Gilmore
- Succeeded by: Ernest O. Thompson

Member of the Texas House of Representatives from the 68th district
- In office January 13, 1903 – January 10, 1905
- Preceded by: John Hemphill
- Succeeded by: George W. Barcus

Member of the Texas House of Representatives from the 66th district
- In office January 10, 1899 – January 13, 1903
- Preceded by: James Sluder
- Succeeded by: Edward English

Personal details
- Born: November 26, 1871 Coryell County, Texas, U.S.
- Died: January 20, 1952 (aged 80) Waco, Texas, U.S.
- Resting place: Oakwood Cemetery
- Party: Democratic
- Spouse: Myrtle Mainer (m. 1899)
- Children: 2
- Education: Baylor University (AB); University of Texas (LLB)
- Profession: Attorney; College president

Pat Morris Neff (November 26, 1871 – January 20, 1952) was an American politician and educator who served as the 28th governor of Texas from 1921 to 1925. A member of the Democratic Party, he served as the ninth president of Baylor University from 1932 to 1947 and the twenty-fifth president of the Southern Baptist Convention from 1944 to 1946. He served as Grand Master of Masons in Texas in 1946.

== Early life ==
Neff was born on his family ranch near the Eagle Springs community in Coryell County, Texas, to Isabella and Noah Neff. Pat grew up on the Texas frontier and attended local schools. He graduated from McGregor High School. He received his bachelor's degree from Baylor University in Waco.

He worked for the next two years teaching at Southwestern Academy in Magnolia, Arkansas, to earn money to go to law school. Among his students was Harvey C. Couch, who would later become a successful entrepreneur in Arkansas.

Upon returning to Texas, Neff studied and received his law degree from the University of Texas School of Law in Austin. There, he developed a close friendship with Tom Connally and Morris Sheppard of Texas, who both became politicians and were later elected as U.S. senators from the state.

After receiving his law degree and passing the bar on May 31, 1899, Neff married Baylor classmate Myrtle Mainer in her hometown of Lovelady. In 1901, they had a daughter, whom they named Hallie Maude. They also had a son, Pat M. Neff, Jr.

== Public office in Texas ==
Neff joined the Democratic Party and entered politics, being elected in 1898 to the Texas House of Representatives, and serving from 1899 to 1905. He was elected to one term as Speaker. After returning to his law practice in Waco, Neff served for six years as the assistant county attorney and then as county attorney for McLennan County.

Considered a progressive Democrat and described as a "friend of organized labor," Neff defeated former U.S. Senator Joseph Weldon Bailey, a former populist, in the party primary for governor in 1920. This defeat effectively ended Bailey's political career. Neff handily won the general election and started his term in 1921. During his tenure, a number of reforms were carried out such as new labor laws, the organization of cooperative marketing associations to assist farmers with selling their commodities, and higher funding for vocational and rural schools.

Neff received criticism during his time as governor for vetoing a minimum wage act. This was introduced to replace a previous minimum wage law that had been repealed by the Texas Legislature. Much of Neff’s opposition to the measure, however, was directed to the fact that it excluded several categories of workers from its provisions, and in his veto message stated that his veto should not be interpreted as meaning that he did not believe in the possibility of a “just and entirely workable” minimum wage bill.

Neff was a strong supporter of prohibition. He was instrumental in the development of the Texas State Parks Board. Neff and his mother, Isabella Neff, donated the land which would become the first state park in Texas. It was named Mother Neff State Park. During the resurgence of the Ku Klux Klan during his administration, Neff was criticized for not taking a stronger stance. Neff is notable for his pardon of folk singer Lead Belly in his last days as governor.

Neff was reelected in 1922 but did not seek a third term in 1924. At the time, it was "understood" that no governor should run for a third term, although Texas did not have official term limits for the office.

In 1924 Miriam Wallace "Ma" Ferguson, wife of controversial former Governor James E. "Pa" Ferguson, won the general election. The Republican nominee, George C. Butte, a jurist who had opposed James Ferguson's line item veto of the 1917 University of Texas appropriations bill, had a stronger than usual showing. Many voters crossed party lines to vote for him, as they were unhappy with the corruption associated with "Pa" Ferguson.

Neff served as a member of the Railroad Commission of Texas from 1929 to 1933.

== President of Baylor University ==
Neff became President of the Board of Trustees of Baylor University in 1907 upon the vacation of that position by B. H. Carroll.

After the death of Samuel Palmer Brooks in 1931, Neff was nominated to replace him as President.

In 1947, Neff was asked to stay on as the President by the staff at Baylor University.

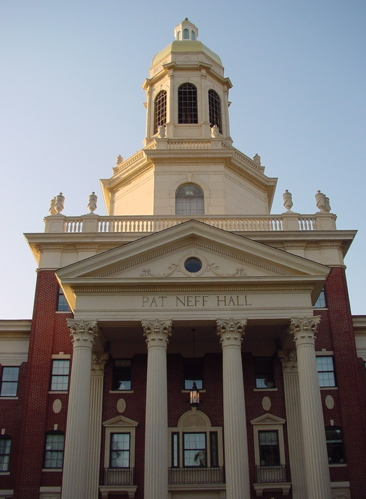
Pat Neff Hall at Baylor University

Illustration of Neff and handwritten signature from 1933 Baylor University "Roundup" yearbook

== President of the Southern Baptist Convention ==
Neff was president of the Southern Baptist Convention from 1944 to 1946.

== Death ==
Neff died in Waco, Texas, January 20, 1952, aged 80, and is interred there at Oakwood Cemetery there.

== Legacy ==
Neff's papers, including those from his time as governor, are housed in The Texas Collection at Baylor University. Pat Neff Hall is deemed after him there.

Pat Neff Elementary School in Houston and Pat Neff Middle School of San Antonio (Northside Independent School District) are named for Neff, as is Pat Neff Hall at Baylor.

== See also ==
- List of Southern Baptist Convention affiliated people
- Southern Baptist Convention
- Southern Baptist Convention Presidents
- Wahrenberger House

Party political offices
Preceded by William P. Hobby	Democratic nominee for Governor of Texas; 1920, 1922	Succeeded by Miriam A. Ferguson
Preceded by W.W. Hamilton	President of the Southern Baptist Convention; 1944–1946	Succeeded by Louie D. Newton
Texas House of Representatives
Preceded by James Sluder	Member of the Texas House of Representatives from District 66 (Waco); 1899–1903	Succeeded by Edward English
Preceded by John Hemphill	Member of the Texas House of Representatives from District 68 (Waco); 1903–1905	Succeeded by George W. Barcus
Political offices
Preceded by Robert E. Prince	Speaker of the Texas House of Representatives; 1903–1905	Succeeded by Francis William Seabury
Preceded by William P. Hobby	Governor of Texas; January 18, 1921 – January 20, 1925	Succeeded by Miriam A. Ferguson
Preceded by Clarence Gilmore	Texas Railroad Commissioner; 1929–1932	Succeeded by Ernest O. Thompson
