= Abner Vernon McCall =

American judge (1915-1995)

- McCall, c. 1962
- Born: June 8, 1915; Perrin, Texas, United States
- Died: June 11, 1995 (aged 80)
- Occupation: Judge
- Known for: justice of the Supreme Court of Texas in 1956, Dean of Baylor Law School from 1948 to 1959, and President of Baylor University from 1961 to 1981

Abner Vernon McCall (June 8, 1915 – June 11, 1995) was a justice of the Supreme Court of Texas in 1956, Dean of Baylor Law School from 1948 to 1959, and the tenth president of Baylor University from 1961 to 1981.

== Biography ==
McCall was born June 8, 1915, in Perrin, Texas. After his father's death and his mother's failing health, he was sent to the Masonic School and Home in Fort Worth. He gained a scholarship to attend Baylor University and graduated in law in 1938. From 1938 to 1942, he was an assistant professor at Baylor. In 1943, he received an LL.M from the University of Michigan.

From 1943 to 1945, he served in the Federal Bureau of Investigation.

In 1946, he returned to Baylor to teach Law, and became Dean of the Law School in 1948. In 1959, he became executive vice-president of Baylor. From 1961 to 1981, he served as president of Baylor. During his presidency, he upheld the traditional Baptist views on dancing, card playing, alcohol, and women wearing slacks, despite the social upheaval of the 1960s. He also threatened to expel any student that posed for Playboy Magazine in 1980 when the magazine published the "Girls of the Southwest Conference" edition. From 1981 to 1985, he was its chancellor. He was, however, a strong supporter of academic freedom and defended the teaching of evolution.

He was appointed a Texas Supreme Court Justice in June 1956 by Governor Allan Shivers. He was also a past president of the Baptist General Convention of Texas.

MacCall "was only three when his father died. Later, when his mother became too ill to support her four children, they were placed in a Masonic home". Then, he was initiated to the Scottish Rite Freemasonry, where he was elevated to the 33rd and highest degree, and later decoration with the Grand Cross.

Political offices
Preceded by Will Wilson	Justice of the Texas Supreme Court; 1956–1956	Succeeded by James R. Norvell
