= Fort Buchanan (Puerto Rico) =

United States Army installation in Puerto Rico

Coordinates: 18°24′38″N 66°07′14″W

FORT BUCHANAN
- Guaynabo, Puerto Rico

Site information
- Type: U.S. Army Garrison
- Controlled by: United States Army

Site history
- Built: 1923
- In use: 1923–Present

Garrison information
- Current commander: Col. David L. Brewer
- Garrison: 1st Mission Support Command

United States Army Garrison Fort Buchanan, is a United States Army installation in Puerto Rico. It is located in the metropolitan area of the capital, San Juan.

== History ==
Puerto Rico was part of the Spanish Empire from the time of Christopher Columbus until the Spanish–American War. United States forces landed in Guánica on July 25, 1898. The last Spanish unit left the island the following October, and the Department of Puerto Rico was established. Upon the signing of the Treaty of Paris on December 10, 1898, Spain ceded Puerto Rico to the Congress of the United States. In 1901 the island was designated to be an unincorporated United States territory by the Supreme Court of the United States in a controversial decision in the case of Downes Vs. Bidwell, the first of several Insular Cases.

=== The Puerto Rico Regiment ===
On July 1, 1899, “The Puerto Rico Regiment of Infantry, United States Army” was created. On July 1, 1901, Lieutenant Colonel James Anderson Buchanan took command of the regiment. He was later promoted to colonel on July 21, 1902, and to brigadier general in 1905. Buchanan served in Puerto Rico from 1898 to 1903 and Fort Buchanan was named after him.

=== Camp Buchanan ===
The Puerto Rico Regiment was officially designated as the 65th Infantry Regiment in 1920, after defending the Canal Zone during World War I. A tract of 300 acres (120 ha) approximately 6 miles (9.7 km) on the south shore of San Juan Bay was acquired to provide the regiment with a training area. The site was established in 1923 as Camp Buchanan. It served as a target range and maneuver area for the U.S. Army and National Guard troops from 1923 to 1939. The 1st Battalion 51st Coast Artillery Regiment was also assigned to Camp Buchanan in 1939.

=== Fort Buchanan ===
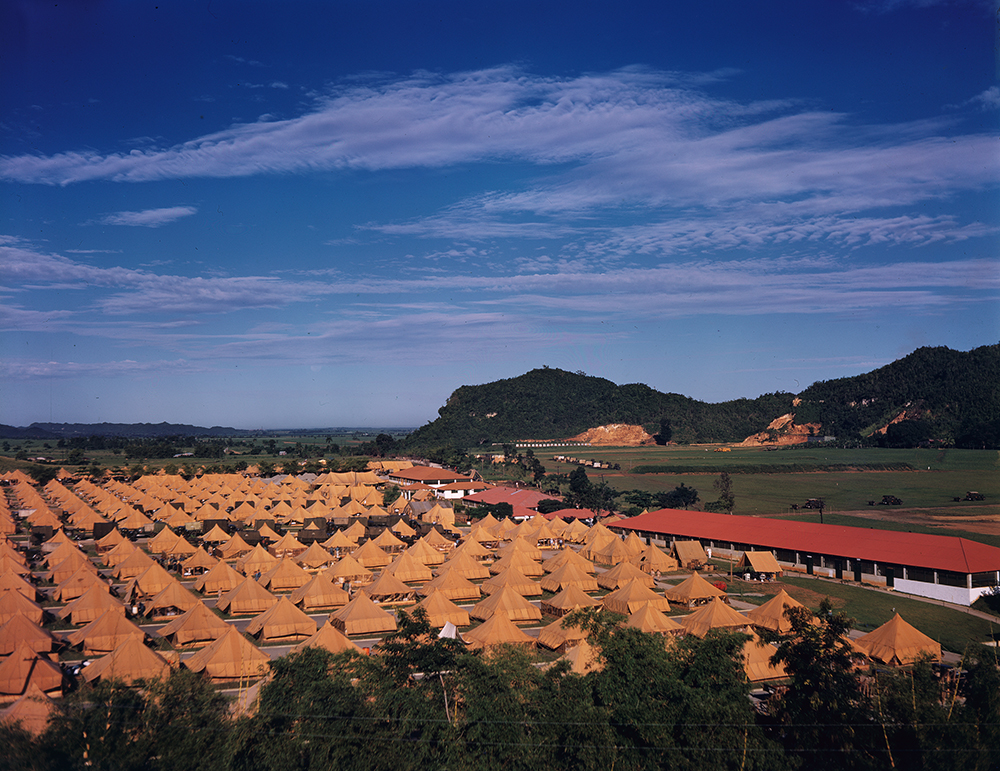
Camp Buchanan in 1939, photograph by Robert Yarnall Richie

In May 1940 the location was renamed Fort Buchanan. It was eventually expanded to 4,500 acres (1,800 ha). During World War II, Fort Buchanan housed a depot supplying the Army Antilles Department. It also processed local troops through its replacement center. The industrial complex included pier facilities, ammunition storage areas and an extensive railroad network connecting the military installation to the Port of San Juan at San Juan Bay.

Puerto Rican soldiers being deployed during World War II and the Korean War were transported from the train station to the Army terminal at the Port of San Juan. At the time, Fort Buchanan served as a citizens training camp and soldier processing station.

After World War II the post was gradually reduced to its current size of 746 acres (302 ha). Fort Buchanan remained a command depot with post facilities, a personnel center, and a special training center until closure as an Army post in 1966. On December 31, 1966, with the deactivation of the Antilles Command, Fort Buchanan passed to the control of the United States Navy.

On December 7, 1971, the Third U.S. Army resumed control of Fort Buchanan, and in 1973 the post came under direct control of the United States Army Forces Command (FORSCOM). Following the Department of Defense Unified Command Plan, Fort Buchanan came under control of United States Southern Command (SOUTHCOM). From 1999 to 2003 it was occupied by United States Army South (USARSO).

In 2002 Fort Buchanan became part of the Southeast Regional Office of the Installation Management Agency (IMA), and in 2003 it became an IMA Reserve installation. In 2006 it became a garrison under United States Army Installation Management Command, Southeast Region (IMCOM-SE).

On October 1, 2008, the Commanding General of the 81st Readiness Division became Fort Buchanan's Senior Mission Commander under the United States Army Reserve Command (USARC). Based on the December 2008 Unified Command Plan, Fort Buchanan currently falls under the United States Northern Command (USNORTHCOM) area of operations, under the direct control of the Installation Management Command, Atlantic Region (IMCOM-Atlantic).

On October 23, 2009, an explosion at the nearby Caribbean Petroleum Corporation caused two people to suffer minor injuries at Fort Buchanan, and four other people sought help for respiratory problems. The explosion caused minor damages in some facilities of the military installation.

In 2017 after the wake of Hurricane Maria, Fort Buchanan served as a command center during the recovery efforts. Military active duty, reserve and National Guard units from the continental United States were mobilized from Fort Buchanan all over the island for the emergency. Thousands of these service members were awarded the Humanitarian Service Medal for their disaster relief efforts. The United States Army Corps of Engineers also managed operations from Fort Buchanan.

== Today ==
United States Army Garrison Fort Buchanan consists of 746.16 acres (301.96 ha) between the municipalities of Bayamón and Guaynabo, Puerto Rico with a real estate value estimated at $560 million. Fort Buchanan serves a population of approximately 130,000, including military personnel, their dependents, retirees, veterans, and the civilian workforce.

Fort Buchanan is host to a number of tenant activities, most of them branches from the United States Armed Forces Reserve Component such as the headquarters for the 1st Mission Support Command (1st MSC) of the United States Army Reserve (USAR) and the Puerto Rico National Guard Joint Forces Headquarters Puerto Rico (JFHQPR).

Fort Buchanan also hosts a number of non-DoD organizations that provide services to soldiers, their dependents, and community members, including the Pentagon Federal Credit Union PenFed, Banco Popular de Puerto Rico, and AAFES Concessionaires. Fort Buchanan also provides support to United States Department of Homeland Security agencies such as the U.S. Customs and Border Protection.

=== Armed Forces Reserve Center ===
The Armed Forces Reserve Center (AFRC) at Fort Buchanan accommodates the U.S. Army Reserve Headquarters and Headquarters Detachment (HHD) of the 393 Combat Sustainment Support Battalion and a Retention Office. The Puerto Rico Army National Guard Recruiting and Retention Division (R&R Div), the 480th Military Police Company and the Medical Section Cell C59. The United States Marine Corps Reserve relocated the Detachment 1, Landing Support Company, Combat Logistics Regiment 45, 4th Marine Logistics Group (4th MLG) into this facility. The Fort Buchanan Armed Forces Reserve Center serves about 400 personnel on a rotating basis, with a maximum of 250 members per weekend. This facility was named after senior civilian aide to the secretary of the Army for Puerto Rico Major General (Ret) Felix A. Santoni.

=== Joint Forces Headquarters Puerto Rico (JFHQPR-Puerto Rico National Guard) ===
A $33.5 million Readiness Center for the Puerto Rico National Guard (PRNG) at Fort Buchanan has been completed. This National Guard Readiness Center at Fort Buchanan overseeing both Army and Air National Guard operations in Puerto Rico. It includes a Metal Storage Building/Maintenance Training Bay, Simulation Center/Physical Training, Emergency Generator and Tank, Vehicle Wash Platform and a Helipad. The Puerto Rico National Guard will posthumously name this Readiness Center at Fort Buchanan after Korean War Veteran and former member of the 65th Infantry Regiment and Medal of Honor recipient Master Sergeant Juan E. Negrón.

=== Army Reserve Center ===
On February 10, 2024, the Army Reserve 1st Mission Support Command (1st MSC), opened a new of the new Army Reserve facility at Fort Buchanan. The facility is 58,199 square foot will serve as the new home for 17 Army Reserve units.

=== Navy Operations Support Center ===
After the closing of Naval Station Roosevelt Roads in 2004 the United States Navy Reserve (USNR) moved its operations to the Navy Operations Support Center Puerto Rico (NOSC Puerto Rico) to Fort Buchanan. In 2017 the Navy Operations Support Center to Fort Buchanan was posthumously named after Vice Chief of Naval Operations, Admiral Horacio Rivero Jr..

== Education ==
The Department of Defense Education Activity (DoDEA) operates schools for children who are dependents of US military personnel:

- Antilles Elementary School
- Antilles Middle School
- Antilles High School

== Post Information ==
- 2 Military Family Housing Areas
  - Coconut Grove - Enlisted and Company Grade Officer Housing
  - Las Colinas - Senior Officer Housing
- Army and Air Force Exchange Service (AAFES)
  - Post Exchange (PX)
  - PXtra/Class Six
  - Gas Station
- Exchange Food Court
- Concessions & shops
- Banco Popular
- Base Library
- Borinquen Lounge & Patio
- Bowling Center
- Cabana Picnic Area
- Café 151
- Civilian Personnel Advisory Center (CPAC)
- Child Development Center
- Community Based Warrior Transition Unit (CBWTU)
- Community Club & Conference Center
- DeCA Commissary
- Defense Military Pay Office (DMPO)
- El Caney Lodge
- Fire Station
- Fort Buchanan Golf Course Complex
- Fort Buchanan Welcome Center, Tricare & ID Card Office
- Holiday Inn Express-Fort Buchannan El Caney Lodge
- Las Casas Lake
- Logistics Readiness Center
- Maxie Williams Jr Field
- Mc Arthur Field
- Network Enterprise Center (NEC)
- Pentagon Federal Credit Union
- Post Chapel
- Post Office
- Ramos Hall
- Rodriguez Army Health Clinic (RACH)
- Skate Park
- Sports & Fitness Center and Roberto Clemente Fitness Center annex
- Training Support Center
- Veterinary Services
- Water Spout Aquatics Center
- Youth Center

== Notable people ==
- Douglas Domenech - Assistant Secretary of the United States Department of the Interior for Office of Insular Affairs and former Virginia Secretary of Natural Resources, graduated from Antilles High School in 1973 at Fort Buchanan.
- Cesar Rodriguez - Retired United States Air Force coronel and Gulf War combat pilot from 1981 to 2006, graduated from Antilles High School in 1977 at Fort Buchanan.
- Eurípides Rubio - United States Army captain and recipient Medal of Honor for his actions during Operation Attleboro with the 1st Battalion, 28th Infantry, 1st Infantry Division, at the Vietnam War entered the Army at Fort Buchanan.
- Frances M. Vega - The first female soldier of Puerto Rican descent to have died in combat in the Iraq War serving with the 151st Adjutant General Postal Detachment 3. She graduated from Antilles High School in 2001 on post. Fort Buchannan Gate #1 was named the SPC Frances M. Vega gate in her honor.
- Marcos Berríos - California Air National Guard major, served in the War in Afghanistan as a search and rescue pilot, aerospace engineer, selected for astronaut candidate in NASA Astronaut Group 23, graduated from Antilles High School in 1997 at Fort Buchanan.

== Climate ==
Climate data for Ft. Buchanan, Puerto Rico
Month	Jan	Feb	Mar	Apr	May	Jun	Jul	Aug	Sep	Oct	Nov	Dec	Year
Mean daily maximum °F (°C)	79 (26)	81 (27)	84 (29)	87 (31)	88 (31)	90 (32)	92 (33)	92 (33)	91 (33)	91 (33)	88 (31)	83 (28)	87 (31)
Mean daily minimum °F (°C)	66 (19)	65 (18)	66 (19)	72 (22)	74 (23)	76 (24)	79 (26)	80 (27)	79 (26)	75 (24)	71 (22)	69 (21)	73 (23)
Average precipitation inches (mm)	4.76 (121)	1.90 (48)	0.98 (25)	4.39 (112)	6.67 (169)	5.18 (132)	4.10 (104)	5.90 (150)	8.00 (203)	5.19 (132)	5.88 (149)	4.18 (106)	56.64 (1,439)
Source: Weatherbase

== Gallery ==
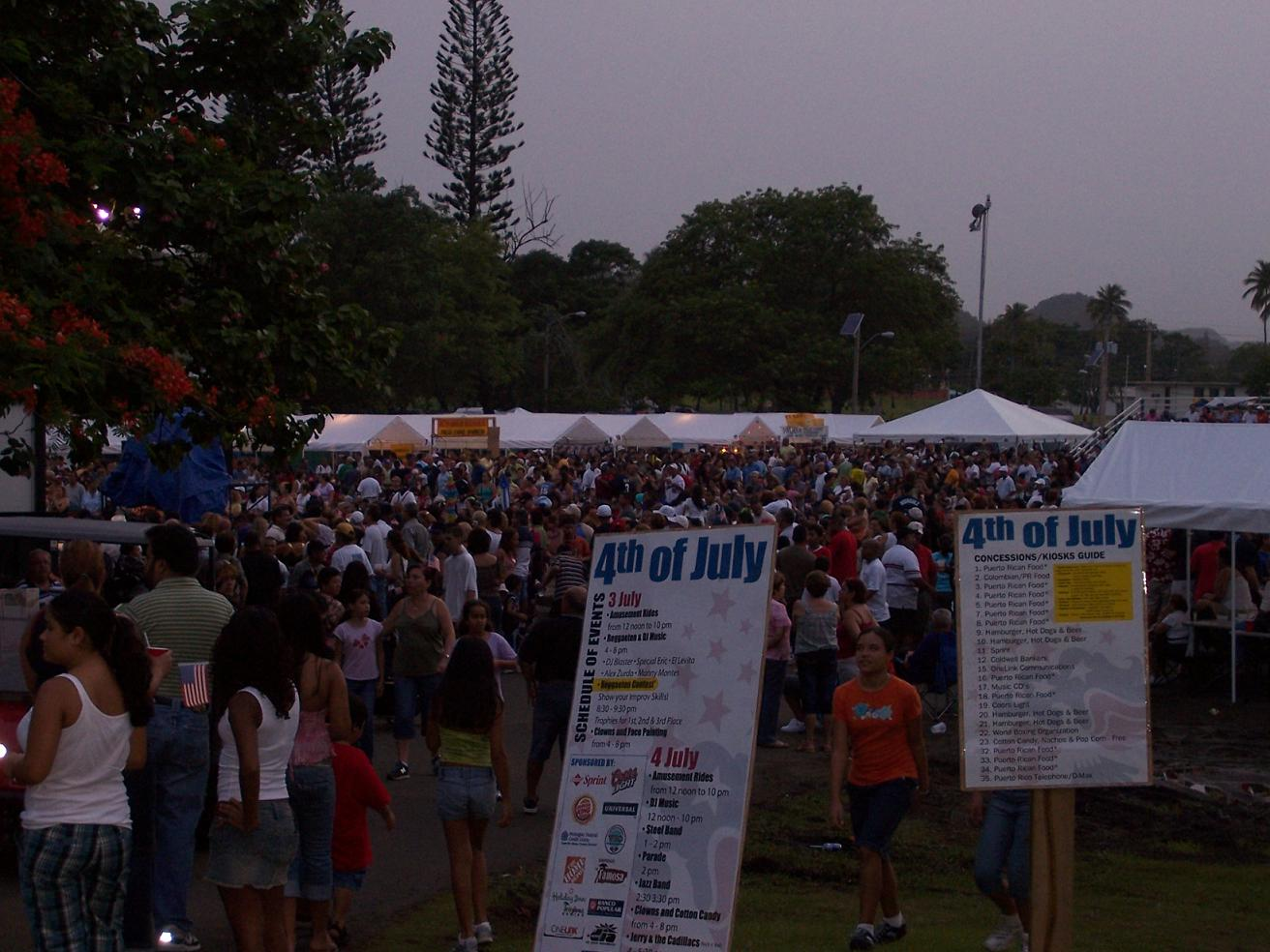
Ft. Buchanan Fourth of July Celebration, 2006

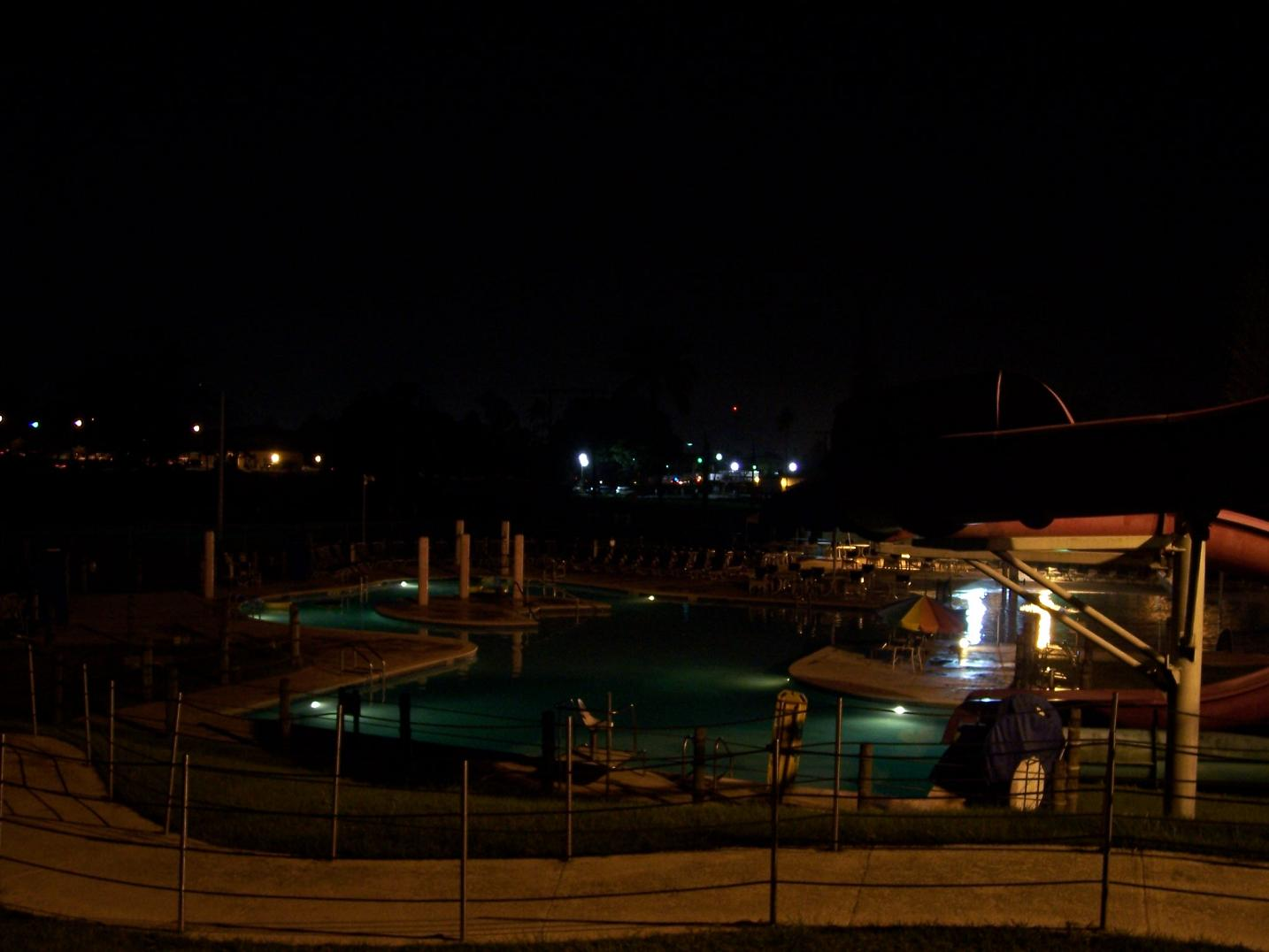
Water Spout Aquatics Center
