= Baylor University Press =

University press

- Parent company: Baylor University
- Founded: 1897 (Historical); 1955 (Modern)
- Country of origin: United States
- Headquarters location: Waco, Texas
- Distribution: Longleaf Services (USA); University of Toronto Press (Canada); EUROSPAN (International)
- Publication types: Books
- Official website: baylorpress.com

Baylor University Press is a university press affiliated with Baylor University, which is located in Waco, Texas. The press releases books largely about religion and theology; it also publishes works about social criticism, sociology, literary criticism, and popular culture.

Baylor University Press is currently a member of both the Association of University Presses, and the Association of American Publishers. In May 2002, it reportedly published around five books annually.

== History ==
While an older "Baylor University Press" was established in 1897 (making it one of the first university presses to be established in the United States); this iteration of the press, operated by Baylor students, published original research by faculty, textbooks, and monographs, as well as periodicals like the Baylor Bulletin (a bimonthly magazine that served as the "official organ" of the university), the Lariat (a weekly university newspaper), and the Round-Up (an annual).

The modern version of the press, on the other hand, was founded in 1955 as a faculty committee that released books intermittently. The press instituted a more "intentional program" of publishing in the 1980s before beginning to expand in 1997. The following year, it joined the Texas A&M University Press's Texas Book Consortium program (although it is not presently a member). Domestic distribution is currently provided by the University of North Carolina Press's Longleaf Services.

=== Controversy ===
In 2006, Baylor University Press drew attention for cancelling the publication of a book (initially titled Baylor Beyond the Crossroads: An Interpretive History, 1985-2005) that focused on former president of Baylor, Robert B. Sloan, and his controversial "Baylor 2012" project. According to Baylor University Press, the book was dropped because it "did not survive external peer review", but other sources (such as the ABC news program Good Morning Texas) contended that the press dropped the book after former Baylor president Herbert H. Reynolds sent a "threatening email to editors ... denouncing" it. After a rewrite, the book was published by St. Augustine's Press as The Baylor Project: Taking Christian Higher Education to the Next Level (2007).

== Publications ==
=== Book series ===
Notable book and monograph series published by Baylor University Press include the following:

- "Baylor Handbook on the Greek New Testament" (BHGNT), edited by Martin Culy
- "Baylor Handbook on the Hebrew Bible" (BHHB), edited by W. Dennis Tucker, Jr.
- "Charles Edmondson Historical Lectures", sponsored by the Department of History, Baylor University
- "Documents of Anglophone Christianity", edited by Roger Lundin and Debora Shuger
- "The Making of the Christian Imagination", edited by Stephen Prickett
- "New Perspectives on Latina/o Religion", edited by Miguel A. De La Torre
- "Studies in Christianity and Literature", sponsored by the Conference on Christianity and Literature
- "Studies in Religion and Higher Education", edited by Michael Beaty et al.
- "Studies in Rhetoric and Religion" (SRR), edited by Martin J. Medhurst

== See also ==
- List of English-language book publishing companies
- List of university presses
