= Ben Domenech =

American writer (born 1982)

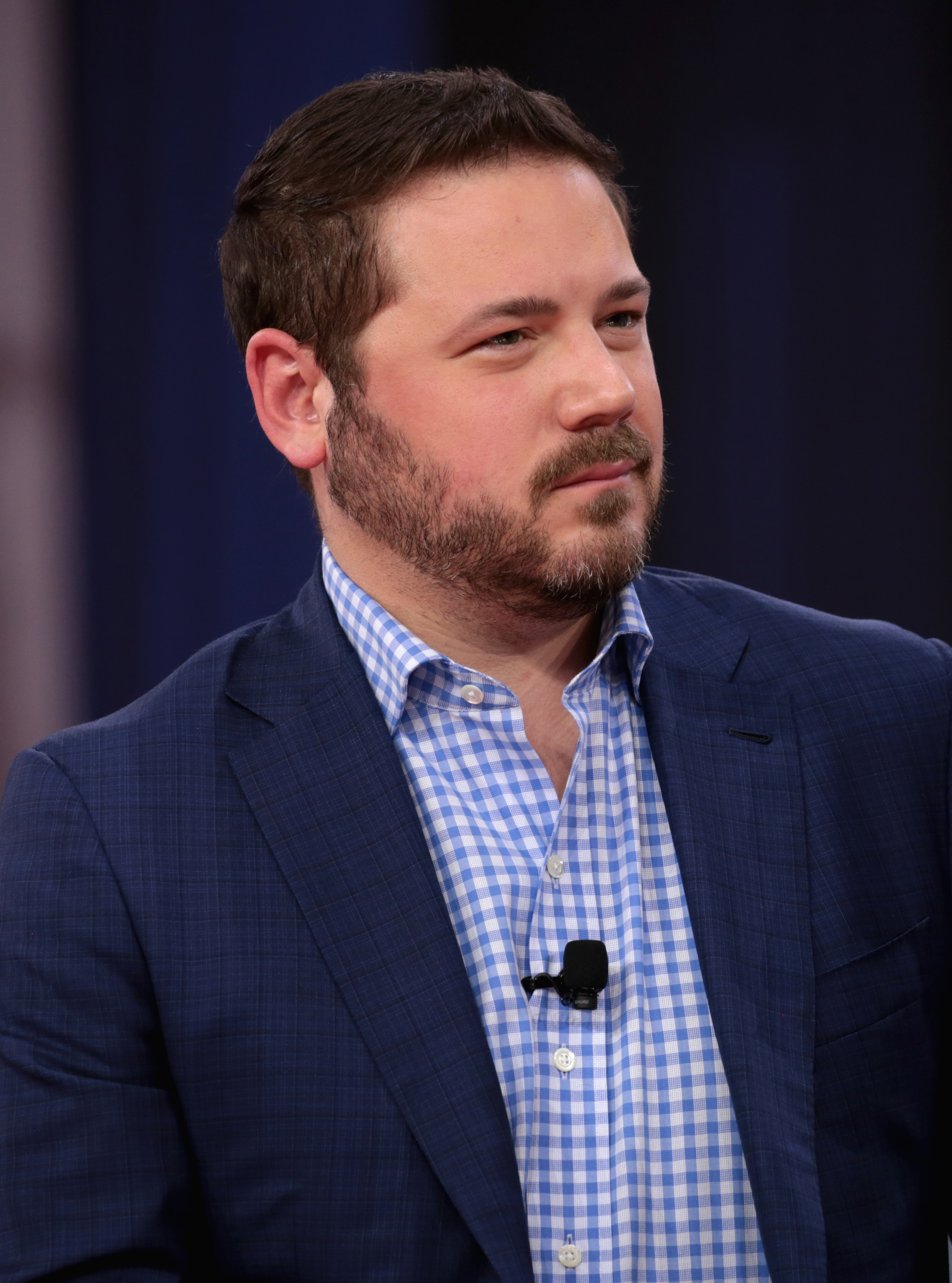
- Domenech in 2018
- Born: Benjamin Domenech; January 1, 1982 (age 44); Jackson, Mississippi, U.S.
- Occupation: Political commentator
- Spouse: Meghan McCain (m. 2017)
- Children: 3
- Father: Douglas Domenech
- Relatives: John McCain (father-in-law); Cindy McCain (mother-in-law)

Benjamin Domenech (/ˈdɒmɪnɛk/; born January 1, 1982) is the opinion editor of The Daily Wire. He is also a television commentator, radio host, and publisher of The Transom, a daily subscription newsletter for political insiders. In 2013, he co-founded The Federalist, where he served as publisher and hosted The Federalist Radio Hour. He earlier had been a co-founder of the RedState group blog. He joined Fox News as a commentator in 2021. From 2022 to 2026, he was editor at large of The Spectator World.

He is the former managing editor for health care policy at The Heartland Institute and former editor-in-chief of The City. He created and hosted a daily free market podcast, Coffee and Markets, until 2014.

== Early life ==
Domenech was born in Jackson, Mississippi, and raised in Charleston, South Carolina. He is the son of Douglas Domenech, who served as the United States Department of the Interior's White House Liaison and the Secretary of the Interior's Deputy Chief of Staff during the George W. Bush administration, and as Assistant Secretary of the Interior for Insular and International Affairs during the first Donald Trump administration.

Domenech's career in punditry began as a teenager when he began a column, "Any Given Sunday", for National Review Online (NRO), in addition to his personal blog. By the age of 15, The Washington Post noted, Domenech had already "accumulated a pile of clips from the Washington Times, Human Events, Reason magazine, The American Conservative and The Washington Post". Even though Domenech was only 18 at the time, the Post assessed "Domenech is a sharp writer with an obvious command of his national politics beat.'

Domenech attended the College of William & Mary from 1999 until 2002, leaving school before his senior year, whereupon he went to work for the United States Department of Health and Human Services.

== Career ==
Domenech's NRO column recapped political talk shows on television. Domenech was the youngest ever political appointee of the George W. Bush administration. His father, Douglas Domenech, had held several mid-level positions in the Bush administration. Ben Domenech later worked as a speechwriter for Health and Human Services Secretary Tommy Thompson.

Domenech subsequently worked as a contributing editor for the National Review Online, followed by two years as chief speechwriter for United States Senator John Cornyn (R-TX). He also then worked as an editor at Regnery Publishing, where he edited books by Michelle Malkin, Ramesh Ponnuru, and Hugh Hewitt.

In March 2006, Domenech was named as a blogger for The Washington Post, hired to contribute to the newspaper's opinion pages from a conservative point of view. Liberal and left-of-center bloggers protested Domenech's appointment, citing what they regarded as inappropriate comments on his blog. Among other things, Domenech had called political cartoonist Ted Rall a "steaming bag of pus"; described Teresa Heinz Kerry, the wife of former Secretary of State John Kerry, as an "oddly shaped egotistical ketchup-colored muppet"; and called Pat Robertson a "senile, crazy old fool". The Post, however, vowed to stand by Domenech.

On March 21, 2006, only three days into his appointment, however, Domenech resigned his position after evidence surfaced showing that he had earlier plagiarized the earlier works of others that had originally appeared in The New Yorker, The Washington Post, the National Review, and several other publications. The Post said it had not known about his plagiarism when the newspaper hired him, and had editors known, they would never have offered him the job in the first place. Jim Brady, the-then executive editor of washingtonpost.com, said he would have fired Domenech had he not first offered to quit because the allegations of plagiarism made it necessary to "sever the relationship".

During the 2008 election, Domenech wrote numerous columns for both Human Events and for The Washington Times. During the 2012 election, Domenech commented extensively on social and economic issues related to the Occupy Wall Street movement. for the Heritage Foundation.

In September 2013, Domenech, along with Luke Sherman and Sean Davis, co-founded The Federalist; senior editors include David Harsanyi and Mollie Hemingway. Domenech said at the time that The Federalist was inspired by the mission and worldview of the original Time magazine's editor, Henry Luce, which he described as, "[leaning] to the political right, with a small-c conservatism equipped with a populist respect for the middle class reader outside of New York and Washington."

In August 2020, Jeremy W. Peters of The New York Times wrote that, under Domenech, "The Federalist has been one of the biggest breakouts ... diving headfirst into the culture wars ... Its pieces have questioned the Me Too movement ... and called the effort to recognize transgender identity a 'war on women.'" Peters wrote that Domenech and other staff for The Federalist "offer an outlet for outrage against those the president has declared his enemies, often by reducing them to a culture war caricature of liberalism."

The Federalist is owned by a private company and thus has not been required to disclose the identities of its financial backers. Domenech and the other founders of the conservative website have refused to do so. BuzzFeed News has reported that the website's funding has prompted "a considerable amount of speculation in the political media world". BuzzFeed further pointed out that "the Federalist has been resolutely opaque about its finances. The site is owned by a private company and doesn't have to disclose its ownership or funding structure; its parent company, FDRLST Media, was incorporated as a limited liability company in Delaware in 2016."

Domenech was a Claremont Institute Lincoln Fellow in 2014.

== Controversies ==
=== Plagiarism ===
In early 2006, Domenech was hired by The Washington Post's online arm to write a blog providing "a daily mix of commentary, analysis and cultural criticism". Media Matters for America criticized the choice, claiming that "[t]here [were], however, no progressive bloggers—and no one left of center with the credentials of a political operative—on washingtonpost.com to provide balance to Domenech." Instapundit founder Glenn Reynolds surmised in an interview The New York Times that Domenech's appointment had attracted anger among liberals "because he was a conservative and he was given real estate at The Washington Post" which in turn spurred bloggers to find "something they could use to get rid of him", referring to the disclosures of Domenech's extensive plagiarism only days after his appointment.

Domenech launched his column for the Post website, Red America, on March 21, 2006, but resigned three days later after having written only six posts, when his fellow bloggers posted evidence online that Domenech had plagiarized the work of other journalists appearing in The Washington Post, The New Yorker, National Review, the humorist P. J. O'Rourke, the film critic Stephanie Zacharek, the writer Mary Elizabeth Williams, and that of several other publications and writers. O'Rourke denied Domenech's claim that the humorist had granted permission to use his words: "I wouldn't want to swear in a court of law that I never met the guy", O'Rourke told The New York Times, "but I didn't give him permission to use my words under his byline, no." Editors for Domenech's college newspaper, The Flat Hat, denied allegations by Domenech that one instance of plagiarism resulted from his editors having "inserted a passage from The New Yorker in an article without his knowledge", saying that "Mr. Domenech's actions, if true, [were] deeply offensive." In another instance, Domenech had plagiarized from a front-page article in The Washington Post, the very newspaper he was now going to work for. And on March 24, 2006, the editors of The National Review confirmed on its blog The Corner that Domenech also appeared to have plagiarized for at least one article he had written for that publication.

Subsequently, Washington Post online editor Jim Brady announced Domenech's resignation saying "[a]n investigation into these allegations [of plagiarism] was ongoing, and in the interim, Domenech has resigned, effective immediately."

After initially denying that he had plagiarized, Domenech apologized, saying that "[t]here [was] no excuse for this. ... I hope that nothing I've done as a teenager or in my professional life will reflect badly on the... principles I believe in."

=== Payments for Malaysian opinion pieces ===
In 2013, Domenech was implicated in a journalism scandal that resulted in the removal of his work from The Washington Examiner and The Huffington Post after it was disclosed that he had received $36,000 from Joshua Trevino, a conservative pundit and lobbyist, in exchange for writing favorable opinion pieces about the government of Malaysia without disclosing the financial relationship. The payments only came to light when Trevino registered as a foreign agent of the Malaysian government, and disclosed that Domenech was one of several young conservative writers he had paid to write articles favorable to the Malaysian regime to bolster its image in conservative media.

After disclosure of the payments, The Washington Examiner and The San Francisco Examiner removed several of Domenech's posts from their respective websites and replaced them with an editors' note saying that "the author of this item presented content for which, unbeknownst to us, and in violation of our standards, had received payment from a third party mentioned therein—a payment which he also failed to disclose." The Washington Examiner owned The San Francisco Examiner at the time and thus shared content.

=== Salt mine tweet ===
In 2019, following the staffs of other American media companies unionizing, Federalist co-founder Domenech tweeted that the "first one of you [who] tries to unionize I swear I'll send you back to the salt mine". In 2020, a National Labor Relations Board judge ruled that Domenech had threatened staff illegally and required the company to post notices in its offices and email employees to inform them about their legal rights. Domenech argued unsuccessfully at the time that the tweet was a joke. The NLRB judge, whose ruling was overturned on appeal, wrote: "In viewing the totality of the circumstances surrounding the tweet, this tweet had no other purpose except to threaten ... Federalist employees with unspecified reprisal, as the underlying meaning of 'salt mine' so signifies."

The New Civil Liberties Alliance, a conservative, libertarian nonprofit dedicated to fighting what it regards as an excessive administrative state, and which had been representing The Federalist pro bono, announced that they would appeal. Reason and National Review also published articles arguing against the judge's decision.

The NLRB upheld the judge's ruling in November 2020. The NLRB ordered The Federalist to "direct Domenech to delete the statement from his personal Twitter account, and to take appropriate steps to ensure Domenech complies with the directive." The Federalist said it would appeal.

In May 2022, however, a three judge panel of the Third Circuit largely absolved Domenech of any wrongdoing, when it unanimously overturned the NLRB, concluding that "a reasonable employee would [not] interpret Domenech's tweet as a veiled threat".

=== Other controversies ===
A June 20, 2002, a Spinsanity.org entry demonstrated that Domenech made up a quote he attributed to Tim Russert in a column he wrote defending President George W. Bush. Domenech responded by saying he would produce evidence that the quote was not "fictitious", but was unable to do so.

In a 2010 post written for CBS, Domenech incorrectly described Supreme Court Justice nominee Elena Kagan as the high court's "first openly gay justice". Dan Farber, the-then editor-in-chief of CBSNews.com, subsequently said in a statement that "after looking at the facts we determined that it was nothing but pure and irresponsible speculation on the blogger's part." Domenech, however, doubled down, writing in an addendum to his column, "I have to correct my text here to say that Kagan is apparently still closeted—odd, because her female partner is rather well known in Harvard circles." Domenech once again provided no credible evidence, to verify his claim. In fact, numerous reports confirmed that Kagan was not gay, forcing Domenech finally to issue a public apology to Kagan "if she [was] offended at all by my repetition of a Harvard rumor in a speculative blog post."

In July 2018, on the day that the Special Counsel Robert Mueller's investigation into Russian interference in the 2016 election indicted 12 Russian agents, Domenech disseminated information from a hoax version of the indictment documents. Domenech falsely reported that "much of it [the indictment] is taken up by the numbers of times that people were posting memes on the internet", citing the fake indictment, which claimed that the 12 Russians charged had only engaged in insignificant "shitposting" and the use of memes.

In May 2019, Domenech's wife Meghan McCain appeared on Late Night with Seth Meyers, where she and host Seth Meyers discussed McCain's assertion that Rep. Ilhan Omar was anti-Semitic. Shortly thereafter, Domenech posted a number of crude tweets targeting Meyers, calling Meyers an "untalented piece of shit" and "monumental asshole" who "only has his job because he regularly gargled Lorne Michaels' balls". The Daily Beast described Domenech's behavior as him having gone "on an unhinged rant against the late-night host ... that was at times homophobic". Domenech later deleted his tweets and apologized for "rage tweeting".

== Personal life ==
Domenech married Meghan McCain, the daughter of the late US Senator John McCain, on November 21, 2017. She gave birth to the couple's first daughter in September 2020, who is the goddaughter of Tulsi Gabbard and her husband Abraham. She gave birth to a second daughter in January 2023, and a son in 2026.
