= 1st Mission Support Command =

US Army Reserve unit based in Puerto Rico and the US Virgin Islands

- Shoulder sleeve insignia
- Active: 7 February 2008 - present
- Country: United States
- Branch: United States Army Reserve
- Type: Support Command
- Role: Sustainment
- Part of: United States Army Reserve Command
- Garrison/HQ: Fort Buchanan, Puerto Rico
- Motto: "Estamos Ready"

Commanders
- Commanding General: Brig. Gen. Christopher Creaghe
- Command Sergeant Major: CSM Lorraine C. Smith

Insignia
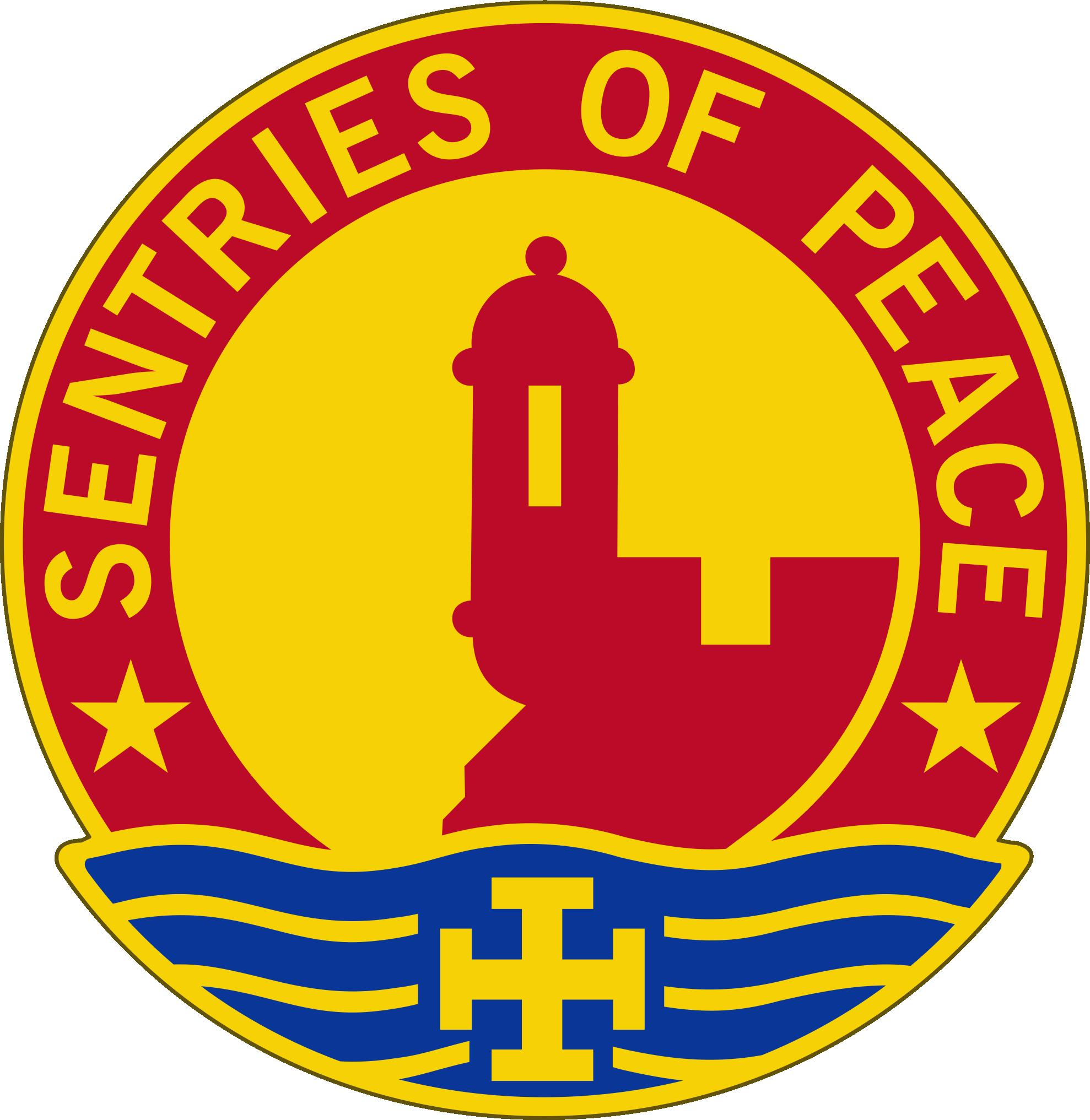
- 1st Mission Support Command DUI

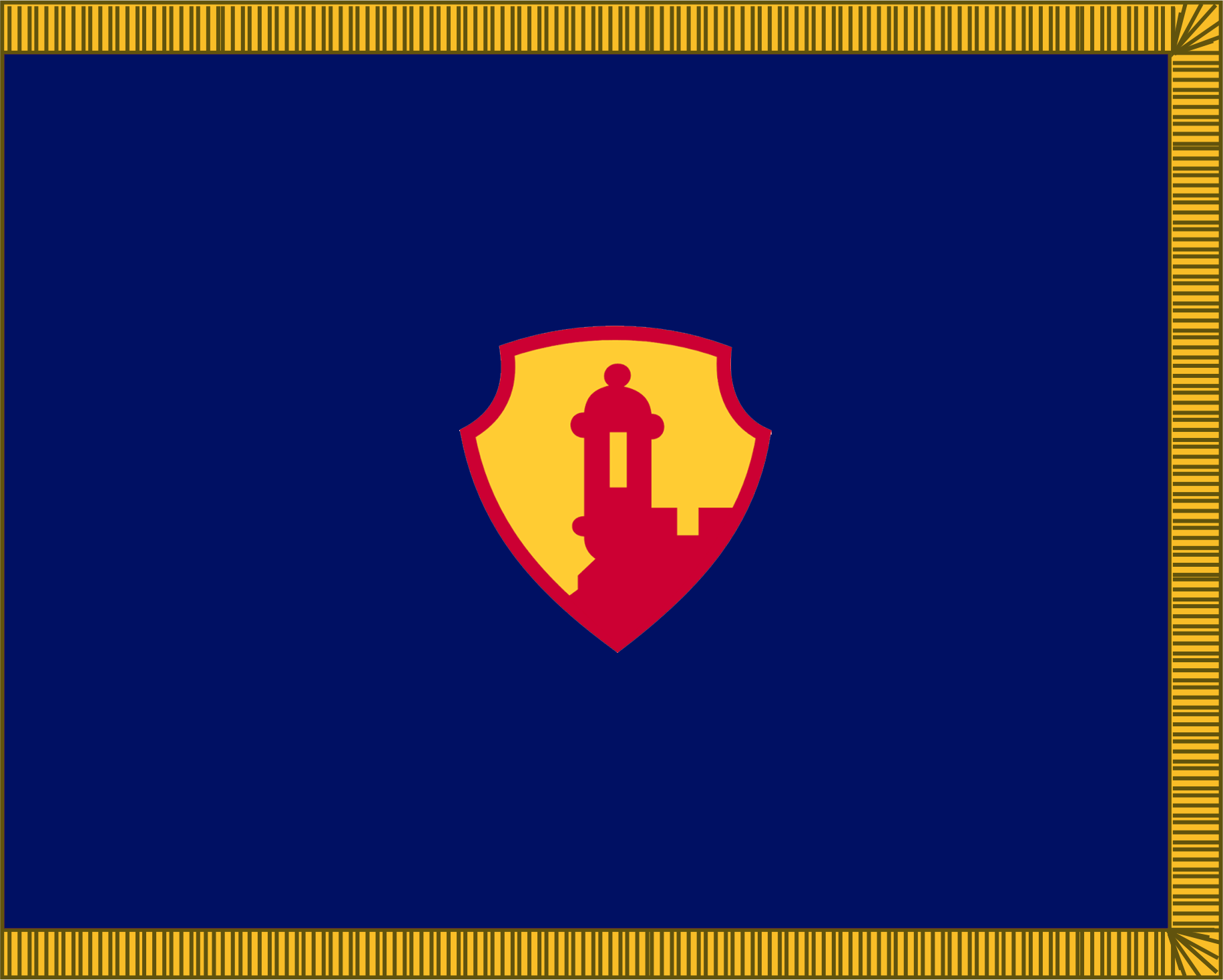
- 1st Mission Support Command Flag

The 1st Mission Support Command (1st MSC) is a United States Army Reserve command providing support to military units based in Puerto Rico and the US Virgin Islands. Headquartered at Fort Buchanan within the metropolitan area of the Puerto Rico's capital San Juan, the command consists of 54 units and fields 4,200 soldiers.

== History ==
In 1922 the 373rd Infantry was moved to the Organized Reserve and was headquartered in San Juan, Puerto Rico.

"The Puerto Rican Department was established by the War Department in May 1939 to assume the responsibility, previously that of the Second Corps Area, for the defense of the Puerto Rico area and for conducting Corps Area administrative, intelligence, training, supply, and other Army services, including the administration of National Guard affairs, in Puerto Rico. In May 1941 the Department was made a regional defense command under the newly established Caribbean Defense Command, and for tactical purposes its territory was regarded as the Puerto Rican Sector. Army forces in the Department were under the operational control of the Navy's Caribbean Sea Frontier. On June 1, 1943, the Puerto Rican Department was renamed the Antilles Department, and its territorial limits were extended to include the bases in the British West Indies and British Guiana leased by the United States from the United Kingdom in September 1940. The area of these bases was collectively called, for tactical purposes, the Trinidad Sector, and in January 1944 it was extended to include the Aruba-Curaçao subsector and territory in Venezuela west of Caracas. The Headquarters of the two successive Departments was at San Juan, P.R."

"The Department's major combat organizations in Puerto Rico were its Coast Artillery troop units, reorganized as the Antilles Coast Artillery Command, and its air defense and air service organization, which developed into the Antilles Air Command (AAC). In October 1943 the AAC withdrew from tactical operations and became essentially an air training command."

"Outside of Puerto Rico, the Antilles Department's major forces at the island bases consisted of garrison forces, which were trained for ground defense operations, if necessary; construction and maintenance troops; and other service troops. These forces were under the general regional supervision of the Trinidad Sector and Base Command, known as the Trinidad Base Command after May 1, 1944. The other island forces were the Antigua Base Command, the Aruba Defense Command, United States Army Forces, Bahamas, the British Guiana Base Command, the Curaçao Defense Command, United States Army Forces, French Guiana, United States Army Forces, Jamaica and (later) the Jamaica Base Command, the Santa Lucia Base Command, and United States Army Forces, Surinam."

"By October 1943 combat operations in the Antilles area came to a successful close, and the Antilles Department's activities during the remainder of the war were redirected toward tactical air and ground training." In 1948 the Antilles Department was renamed the United States Army Forces, Antilles."

The Puerto Rican Department first wore the Garita Patch in 1942. It was redesignated for the Antilles Department in 1944 and in 1948, the unit was redesignated U.S. Army Forces, Antilles.

Brigadier General Edwin L. Sibert, Commander, United States Army Forces, Antilles, represented the United States Army at the 100th anniversary of the raising of the Flag of Cuba in June 1950, during the presidency of Carlos Prío Socarrás in Cuba.

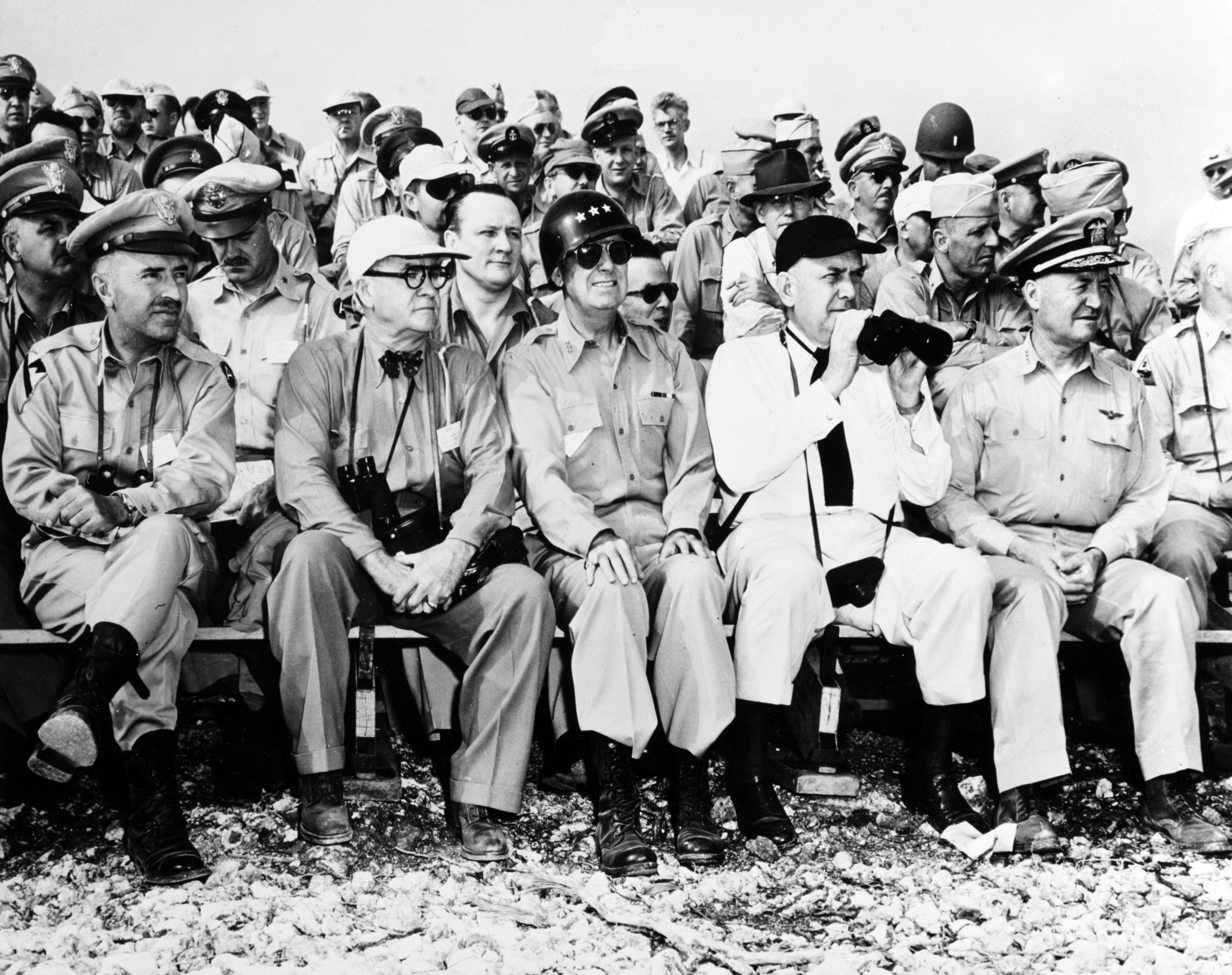
Senior U.S. Department of Defense officials and officers witness Operation Portrex maneuvers on Puerto Rico, 8 March 1950. Sibert appears to have served as Opposing Force commander.

In 1973, the Support Group was placed directly under First United States Army. By 1974, the 166th Support Group was given full mission control of all United States Army Reserve units in Puerto Rico and the United States Virgin Islands and assumed the mission and functions of a major U.S. Army Reserve Command, under First U.S. Army.

The insignia was reassigned to the 7581st USAR Garrison in 1981 and redesignated to the U.S. Army Reserve Forces Puerto Rico in 1990. The lineage continued through the 65th U.S. Army Reserve Command in 1992, and again to the 65th Regional Support Command in 1998. The 65th RSC became the 65th Regional Readiness Command in 2003. The lineage passed to the 166th Support Group in 2007, and finally the 1st Support Command on 7 February 2008.

Today the 1st Mission Support Command continues to wear the Garita Patch.

== Organization ==
The 1st Mission Support Command is a subordinate geographic command of the United States Army Reserve Command responsible for reserve units in Puerto Rico and the US Virgin Islands. As of January 2026 the command consists of the following units:

- 1st Mission Support Command, at Fort Buchanan (PR)
  - Headquarters and Headquarters Company, at Fort Buchanan (PR)
  - 363rd Public Affairs Detachment, at Fort Buchanan (PR)
  - 166th Regional Support Group, at Fort Buchanan (PR)
    - Headquarters and Headquarters Company, at Fort Buchanan (PR)
    - 346th Transportation Battalion (Motor), at Roosevelt Roads Naval Station (PR)
      - Headquarters and Headquarters Detachment, 346th Transportation Battalion (Motor), at Roosevelt Roads Naval Station (PR)
      - 204th Transportation Medium Truck Company (POL, 5K GAL) (Echelon Above Brigade Linehaul), in Juana Díaz (PR)
      - 273rd Transportation Detachment (Movement Control Team), at Roosevelt Roads Naval Station (PR)
      - 390th Transportation Company (Seaport Operations), at Roosevelt Roads Naval Station (PR)
      - 420th Quartermaster Company (Supply), in Puerto Nuevo (PR)
      - 432nd Transportation Medium Truck Company (Cargo) (Echelon Above Brigade Linehaul), at Roosevelt Roads Naval Station (PR)
      - 512th Transportation Detachment (Movement Control Team), in Saint Thomas (US Virgin Islands)
      - 597th Quartermaster Company (Field Service) (Modular), in Puerto Nuevo (PR)
      - 941st Quartermaster Company (Petroleum Support), in Salinas (PR)
      - 969th Quartermaster Detachment (Petroleum Liaison Team), in Salinas (PR)
      - 973rd Quartermaster Company (Water Purification and Distribution), in Ceiba (PR)
    - 393rd Combat Sustainment Support Battalion, at Fort Buchanan (PR)
      - Headquarters and Headquarters Company, 393rd Combat Sustainment Support Battalion, at Fort Buchanan (PR)
      - 215th Military Police Detachment (Law Enforcement), at Fort Buchanan (PR)
      - 268th Transportation Company (Inland Cargo Transfer Company — ICTC), at Fort Buchanan (PR)
      - 271st Personnel Company (Human Resources), at Fort Buchanan (PR)
      - 301st Military Police Company (General Support), at Fort Buchanan (PR)
      - 389th Financial Management Support Detachment, at Fort Buchanan (PR)
      - 398th Financial Management Support Detachment, at Fort Buchanan (PR)
      - 413th Financial Management Support Detachment, at Fort Buchanan (PR)
      - 430th Quartermaster Company (Field Service) (Modular), at Fort Buchanan (PR)
      - 613th Military Police Company (Detention), at Juana Díaz (PR)
      - 764th Quartermaster Detachment (Field Feeding Team), in Ceiba (PR)
      - 765th Quartermaster Detachment (Field Feeding Team), at Fort Buchanan (PR)
      - 766th Quartermaster Detachment (Field Feeding Team), in Puerto Nuevo (PR)
  - 210th Regional Support Group, in Aguadilla (PR)
    - Headquarters and Headquarters Company, in Aguadilla (PR)
    - 35th Expeditionary Signal Battalion, in Juana Díaz (PR)
      - Headquarters and Headquarters Company, in Juana Díaz (PR)
      - Alpha Company, 35th Expeditionary Signal Battalion, in Yauco (PR)
      - Bravo Company, 35th Expeditionary Signal Battalion, in Aguadilla (PR)
      - Charlie Company, 35th Expeditionary Signal Battalion, in Puerto Nuevo (PR)
    - 77th Combat Sustainment Support Battalion, in Aguadilla (PR)
      - Headquarters and Headquarters Company, 77th Combat Sustainment Support Battalion, in Aguadilla (PR)
      - 246th Quartermaster Company (Mortuary Affairs), in Mayagüez (PR)
      - 266th Ordnance Company (Ammo) (Modular), in Aguadilla (PR)
      - 276th Ordnance Company (Support Maintenance), at Fort Allen (PR)
      - 311th Quartermaster Company (Mortuary Affairs), in Aguadilla (PR)
    - 448th Engineer Battalion, at Fort Buchanan (PR)
      - Headquarters and Headquarters Company, 448th Engineer Battalion, at Fort Buchanan (PR)
      - Forward Support Company, 448th Engineer Battalion, at Fort Buchanan (PR)
      - 471st Engineer Company (Vertical Construction Company — VCC), at Fort Buchanan (PR)
      - 475th Engineer Company (Engineer Construction Company — ECC), in Ponce (PR)
      - 602nd Engineer Detachment (Engineer Facility Detachment — EFD), at Fort Buchanan (PR)
      - 603rd Engineer Detachment (Concrete Section), at Fort Buchanan (PR)
      - 756th Engineer Company (Engineer Construction Company — ECC), at Roosevelt Roads Naval Station (PR)
  - Caribbean Readiness Group, at Fort Buchanan (PR)
    - 49th Medical Battalion (Multifunctional), in Puerto Nuevo (PR)
      - Headquarters and Headquarters Detachment, in Puerto Nuevo (PR)
      - 334th Medical Detachment Team (Optometry), in Puerto Nuevo (PR)
      - 335th Medical Company (Area Support), in Puerto Nuevo (PR)
      - 407th Medical Company (Ground Ambulance), in Puerto Nuevo (PR)
    - 1st Battalion, 333rd Regiment (Multifunctional Training), at Fort Buchanan (PR)
    - 2nd Battalion, 348th Regiment (Training Support), at Fort Buchanan (PR)
    - 1st Battalion, 389th Regiment (Basic Combat Training), at Fort Buchanan (PR)
    - 402nd Civil Affairs Battalion, at Fort Buchanan (PR)
