= T. Scott Garrett =

American politician (born 1956)

Scott Garrett

Member of the Virginia House of Delegates from the 23rd district
- In office January 13, 2010 – January 8, 2020
- Preceded by: Shannon Valentine
- Succeeded by: Wendell Walker

Personal details
- Born: Thomas Scott Garrett; June 22, 1956 (age 70) Norfolk, Virginia, U.S.
- Party: Republican
- Spouse: Whitney Carol Eanes
- Children: Tyler; Haley Gray
- Education: University of Virginia (B.A., M.D.)
- Profession: Surgeon
- Committees: Finance; Health Welfare and Institutions; Transportation
- Website: tscottgarett.com

Thomas Scott Garrett (born July 22, 1956) is an American politician. He served on the Lynchburg, Virginia city council from 2006 until 2010, when he entered the Virginia House of Delegates, where until 2020 he represented the 23rd district, made up of parts of Amherst and Bedford Counties and Lynchburg. He is a member of the Republican Party.

Garrett received an M.D. degree from the University of Virginia in 1984, and has been a practicing general surgeon in the Lynchburg area since 1989.

== Electoral history ==
Date	Election	Candidate	Party	Votes	%
Virginia House of Delegates, 23rd district
June 9, 2009	Republican primary	T. Scott Garrett		2,126	54.01
June 9, 2009	Republican primary	Jeff S. Helgeson		1,810	45.98
November 3, 2009	General	T. Scott Garrett	Republican	10,813	50.41
November 3, 2009	General	Shannon R. Valentine	Democratic	10,604	49.44
November 3, 2009	General	Write Ins		31	0.14
November 3, 2009	General	Incumbent lost; seat switched from Democratic to Republican			
November 8, 2011	General	T. Scott Garrett	Republican	11,978	92.26
November 8, 2011	General	Write Ins		1,004	7.73

== See also ==
- Lynchburg, Virginia
- 2009 Virginia elections
