= Wendell Walker =

American politician

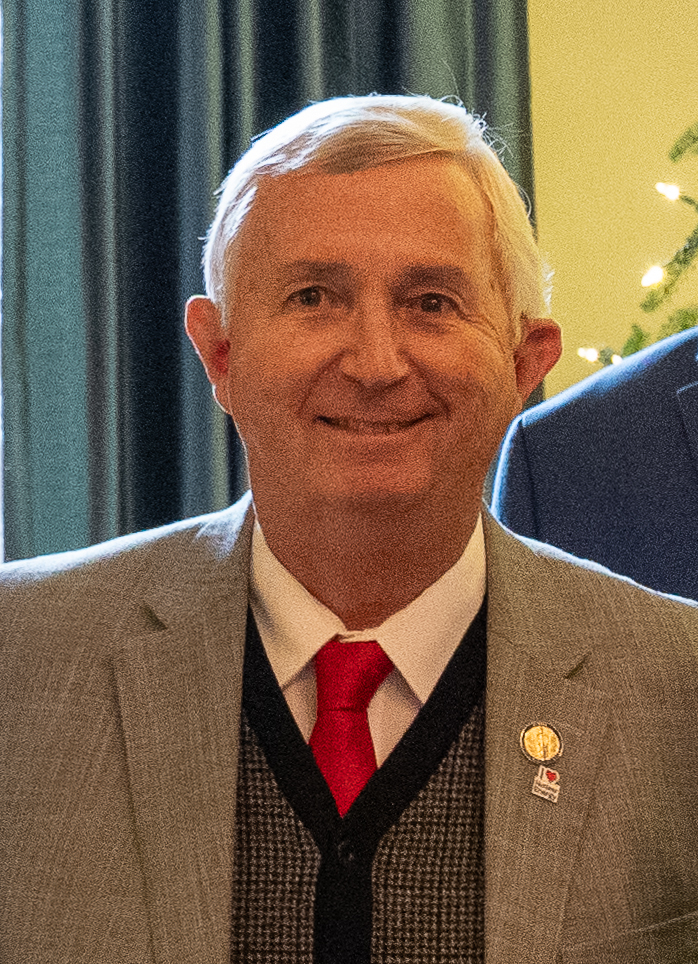

Member of the Virginia House of Delegates
- Incumbent
- Assumed office January 8, 2020
- Preceded by: Scott Garrett
- Constituency: 23rd district (2020–2024); 52nd district (2024–present)

Personal details
- Born: Wendell Scott Walker; November 21, 1952 (age 73) Macon, Georgia, U.S.
- Party: Republican
- Spouse: Patsy Walker
- Education: Liberty University
- Committees: Health, Welfare and Institutions; Finance; General Laws
- Website: https://www.wendellwalker.org/

Wendell Scott Walker is an American politician. Since 2020, he has been a Republican member of the Virginia House of Delegates, representing the 52nd district, consisting of the city of Lynchburg and part of Campbell County.

== Biography ==
Walker is a prominent leader in the local Republican party, and has held positions in local and state committees, including the chair of the Lynchburg Republican Committee.

== Electoral history ==
Date	Election	Candidate	Party	Votes	%
Virginia House of Delegates, 23rd District
Jun 11, 2019	Republican primary	Wendell S. Walker		2,486	41.7
Jun 11, 2019	Republican primary	E.J. Turner Perrow, Jr.		2,339	39.3
Jun 11, 2019	Republican primary	Ronald R. Berman		1,133	19
Nov 5, 2019	General	Wendell S. Walker	Republican	13,529	63.80
Nov 5, 2019	General	David A. Zilles	Democratic	7,609	35.90
Nov 5, 2019	General	Write Ins		53	0.30
Nov 5, 2019	General	Scott Garrett retired; seat stayed Republican			
Nov 2, 2021	General	Wendell S. Walker	Republican	22,045	66.57
Nov 2, 2021	General	Natalie A. Short	Democratic	11,007	33.24
Nov 2, 2021	General	Write Ins		64	0.19
Nov 7, 2023	General	Wendell S. Walker	Republican	10,574	54.46
Nov 7, 2023	General	Jennifer K. Woofter	Democratic	8,825	45.45
Nov 7, 2023	General	Write Ins		18	0.09

== Tenure ==
=== Equal Rights Amendment ===
During the 2020 regular session, Walker voted yes for the Equal Rights Amendment, which Conservative Activists opposed as it is argued to allow tax-payer funded Abortion Health Care. Walker later claimed he intended to vote nay.

=== Memorial of Harry F. Byrd ===
In early February 2020, Walker proposed a bill to remove a Statue of Harry F. Byrd, a prominent Democrat who is often infamously remembered for his racist opposition to desegregation, in response to efforts from state Democrats to remove more Confederate statues in the state. Such measures were undertaken across the country in the aftermath of the Charleston church shooting in 2015 and they were eventually galvanized in the aftermath of the Unite The Right Rally in 2017. After the Democrats agreed to support his measure to remove the statue which serves as a tribute to Byrd, Walker requested that the state legislature should not consider his own bill. He said that "the reason I put that in was more of a political reason." Walker continued by saying "I think history is very important, whether it’s good, bad or ugly. I was not willing to allow the governor to have the opportunity to remove statues." Even though the Virginia House Rules Committee voted to let the bill go for the day, as opposed to removing it from consideration like Walker had requested, Virginia House Majority Leader Charniele Herring (D) said that she wanted to hear Walker's own reasoning on why he wanted to kill a bill that he himself had introduced for consideration in the state legislature. Two other bills were struck as supplications of their sponsors following the introduction of Walker's bill.
