= Preston Bryant =

American politician

7th Virginia Secretary of Natural Resources
- In office January 14, 2006 – January 16, 2010
- Governor: Tim Kaine
- Preceded by: W. Tayloe Murphy Jr.
- Succeeded by: Douglas Domenech

Member of the Virginia House of Delegates from the 23rd district
- In office January 10, 1996 – January 11, 2006
- Preceded by: Stephen Newman
- Succeeded by: Shannon Valentine

Personal details
- Born: Larry Preston Bryant, Jr. June 5, 1964 (age 62) Lynchburg, Virginia, U.S.
- Party: Republican
- Spouse: Elizabeth Southworth Walker
- Education: Randolph–Macon College; University of Richmond; University of London

Larry Preston Bryant Jr. (born June 5, 1964) is a former member of the Virginia House of Delegates who served as Secretary of Natural Resources under Governor Tim Kaine.

Virginia House of Delegates
Preceded by Stephen Newman	Virginia Delegate for the 23rd District; 1996–2006	Succeeded by Shannon R. Valentine
Political offices
Preceded by W. Tayloe Murphy Jr.	Virginia Secretary of Natural Resources; 2006–2010	Succeeded by Douglas Domenech
