= Matt Strickler =

American politician

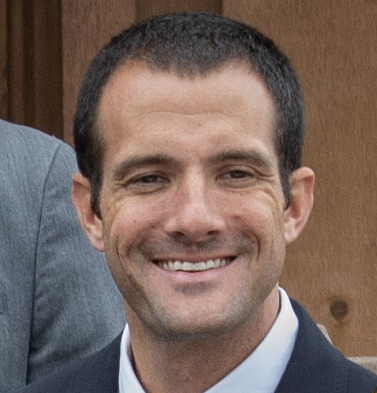

10th Virginia Secretary of Natural Resources
- In office January 13, 2018 – September 27, 2021
- Governor: Ralph Northam
- Preceded by: Molly Joseph Ward
- Succeeded by: Ann Jennings

Personal details
- Born: May 16
- Party: Democratic
- Education: Washington and Lee University (BA); College of William and Mary (MS, MPP)

Matthew Strickler (born May 16) is the former Deputy Assistant Secretary for Fish and Wildlife and Parks for the U.S. Department of the Interior. Previously he served as the Virginia Secretary of Natural Resources under Governor Ralph Northam.

== Background ==
Strickler hails from Lexington, Virginia. After receiving degrees in public policy and environmental studies from Washington and Lee University, he completed master's programs in public policy and marine science at the College of William and Mary, where he studied aquaculture and sustainable development at the Virginia Institute of Marine Science. Strickler completed his studies at the College of William and Mary in 2007. He was selected that year as a Knauss Marine Policy Fellow through the Virginia Sea Grant Program.

== Career ==
Strickler met Ralph Northam in 2008 while working in Hampton Roads for Mark Warner's 2008 senatorial campaign. Northam then brought Strickler on as a legislative aid upon being elected to the Virginia State Senate. Strickler oversaw Northam's offices in Richmond and Norfolk. In 2010, The Virginian-Pilot described Strickler as Northam's "only full-time staffer".

Strickler has also served as a senior policy adviser to the U.S. House Committee on Natural Resources.

In 2010, Strickler co-founded Old Plantation Oyster Company LLC, an oyster farming company in Cape Charles, Northampton County on Virginia's Eastern Shore. His co-founder, Clark Mercer, served as Northam's Chief of Staff during Northam's lieutenant governorship, and continued to serve in a similar position under Northam's governorship. Strickler resigned in 2021 to join the Biden administration.
