= Molly Joseph Ward =

American government official, politician, and attorney

Molly Ward
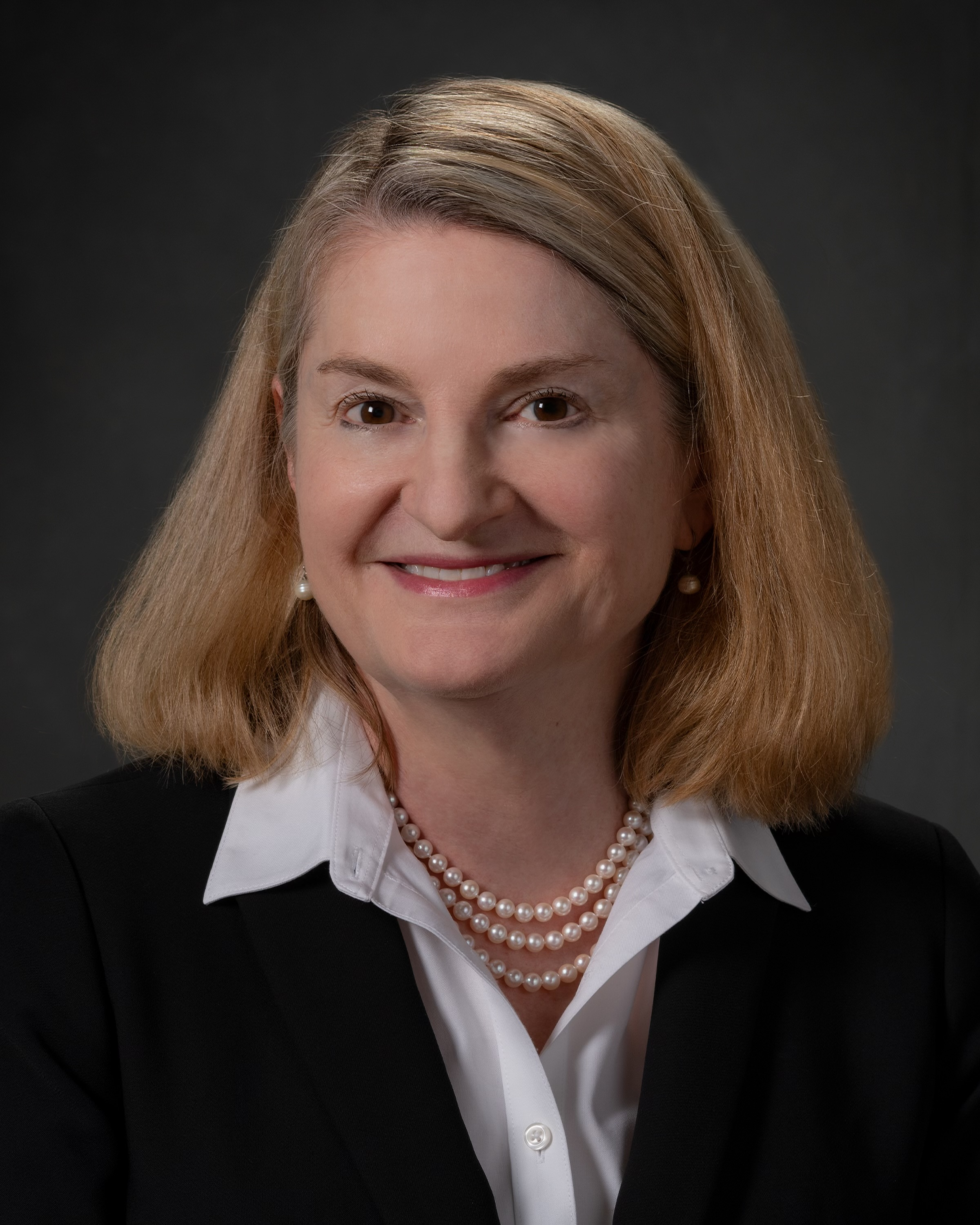

9th Virginia Secretary of Natural Resources
- In office January 11, 2014 – January 13, 2018
- Governor: Terry McAuliffe
- Preceded by: Douglas Domenech
- Succeeded by: Matt Strickler

Mayor of Hampton
- In office July 2008 – October 4, 2013
- Preceded by: Ross Kearney II
- Succeeded by: George E. Wallace

Personal details
- Born: Molly Boyd Joseph Newport News, Virginia, U.S.
- Party: Democratic
- Spouse: Forrest Siegfried Ward
- Education: University of Virginia (BA); College of William and Mary (JD)

Molly Joseph Ward is an American government official, politician, and attorney. She served as Virginia Secretary of Natural Resources from 2014 to 2018 under Governor Terry McAuliffe. Prior to this, she worked in The White House, where she was a Special Assistant to the President and Deputy Director of Intergovernmental Affairs.

From 2008 to 2013, she served as mayor of Hampton, Virginia. She served as city treasurer from 2002 to 2008 prior to her mayoral tenure, and returned to the position in 2017.

== Education ==
In 1983, she graduated from the University of Virginia with a B.A. in English, and later received her legal education at the College of William & Mary.

== Career ==
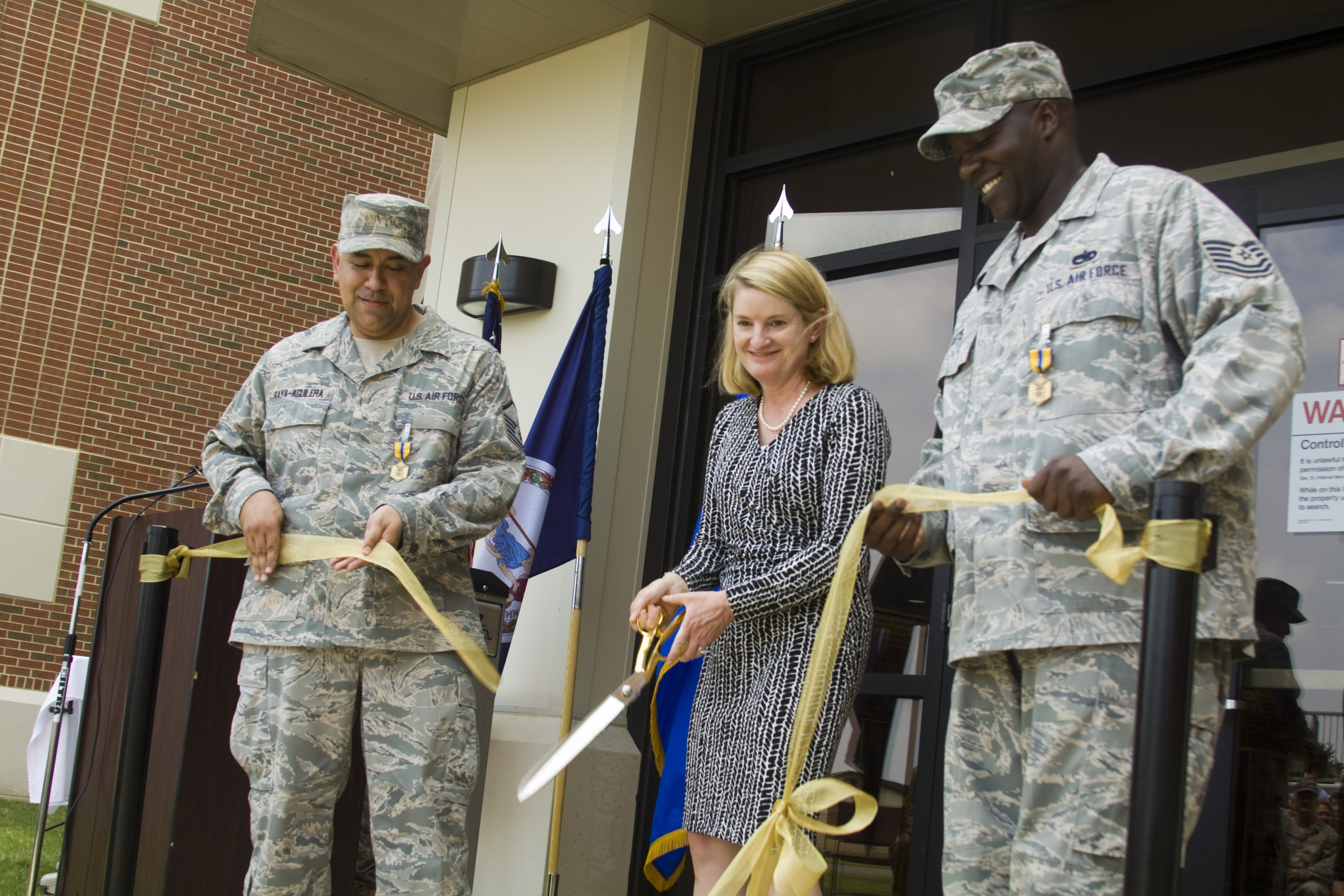
Then-Mayor Ward (middle) joining Sgt. Joaquin Raya (left) and Tech Sgt. Gregory Artis (right) in cutting the ribbon at the Langley Air Force Base

Ward served as city treasurer in Hampton, Virginia from 2002 to 2008. As treasurer, she was credited with balancing the city's financial department's books without presiding over tax increases. She was elected mayor of Hampton in 2008 and was reelected in 2012 with two-thirds of the vote. Ward additionally served on the board of the Virginia Outdoors Foundation.

In 2013, she left her position as mayor to join as the Obama administration as Special Assistant to the President and Deputy Director of Intergovernmental Affairs. In this role, she was credited with helping to securing Fort Monroe's designation as a federal monument. In the position, she was responsible for engaging with municipal and county officials across the country on behalf of The White House.

Following Terry McAuliffe's election as Governor of Virginia, she was chosen for the position of Virginia Secretary of Natural Resources.

In 2017, she returned to Hampton municipal politics to run for city treasurer unopposed.
