= Virginia's 23rd House of Delegates district =

Virginia legislative district

Virginia's 23rd State House of Delegates district
- District map from the 2023 election
Delegate
Margaret Franklin; D–Woodbridge
- Demographics: 26% White; 36% Black; 22% Hispanic; 10% Asian; 0% Native American; 0% Hawaiian/Pacific Islander; 1% Other; 5% Multiracial
- Population (2024) • Voting age: 89,666; 18
- Registered voters: 55,242

Virginia's 23rd House of Delegates district elects one of 100 seats in the Virginia House of Delegates, the lower house of the state's bicameral legislature. District 23 represents part of the city of Lynchburg and parts of Amherst and Bedford counties. The seat is currently held by Democrat Margaret Franklin following the 2026 special election.

== District officeholders ==
Years	Delegate	Party	Electoral history
January 8, 1992 – January 10, 1996	Stephen Newman	Republican	Declined to seek reelection; elected to the Senate of Virginia
January 10, 1996 – January 11, 2006	Preston Bryant	Republican	Resigned; Appointed Virginia Secretary of Natural Resources
January 11, 2006 – January 13, 2010	Shannon Valentine	Democratic	Elected via special election; Defeated in bid for reelection
January 13, 2010 – January 8, 2020	T. Scott Garrett	Republican	First elected in 2009
January 8, 2020 – 2024	Wendell Walker	Republican	First elected in 2019
2024 – 2026	Candi King	Democratic	
January 14, 2026 – present	Margaret Franklin	Democratic	Elected via special election in 2026

== Electoral history ==
Date	Election	Candidate	Party	Votes	%
Virginia House of Delegates, 23rd district
Jan 10, 2006	Special	Shannon R. Valentine	Democratic	7,887	57.50
Jan 10, 2006	Special	Michael B. Harrington	Republican	5,817	42.41
Jan 10, 2006	Special	Write Ins		12	0.09
Jan 10, 2006	Special	Preston Bryant resigned; seat switched from Republican to Democratic			
Nov 6, 2007	General	Shannon R. Valentine	Democratic	4,551	95.60
Nov 6, 2007	General	Write Ins		209	4.39
Jun 9, 2009	Republican primary	T. Scott Garrett		2,126	54.01
Jun 9, 2009	Republican primary	Jeff S. Helgeson		1,810	45.98
Nov 3, 2009	General	T. Scott Garrett	Republican	10,813	50.41
Nov 3, 2009	General	Shannon R. Valentine	Democratic	10,604	49.44
Nov 3, 2009	General	Write Ins		31	0.14
Nov 3, 2009	General	Incumbent lost; seat switched from Democratic to Republican			
Nov 8, 2011	General	T. Scott Garrett	Republican	11,978	92.26
Nov 8, 2011	General	Write Ins		1,004	7.73
