= The City (magazine) =

American magazine of evangelical Christianity

- Editor: Benjamin Domenech
- Categories: Evangelical Christianity
- Frequency: Triannually
- Publisher: Robert B. Sloan
- First issue: Spring 2008
- Company: Houston Baptist University
- Country: United States
- Based in: Houston, Texas
- Website: www.civitate.org

The City is an American magazine of evangelical Christianity that was established in 2008.

== Overview ==
The magazine is published three times a year by Robert B. Sloan, the president of Houston Christian University in Houston, Texas. The editor-in-chief is Benjamin Domenech.
