= Frankston, Texas =

- Town
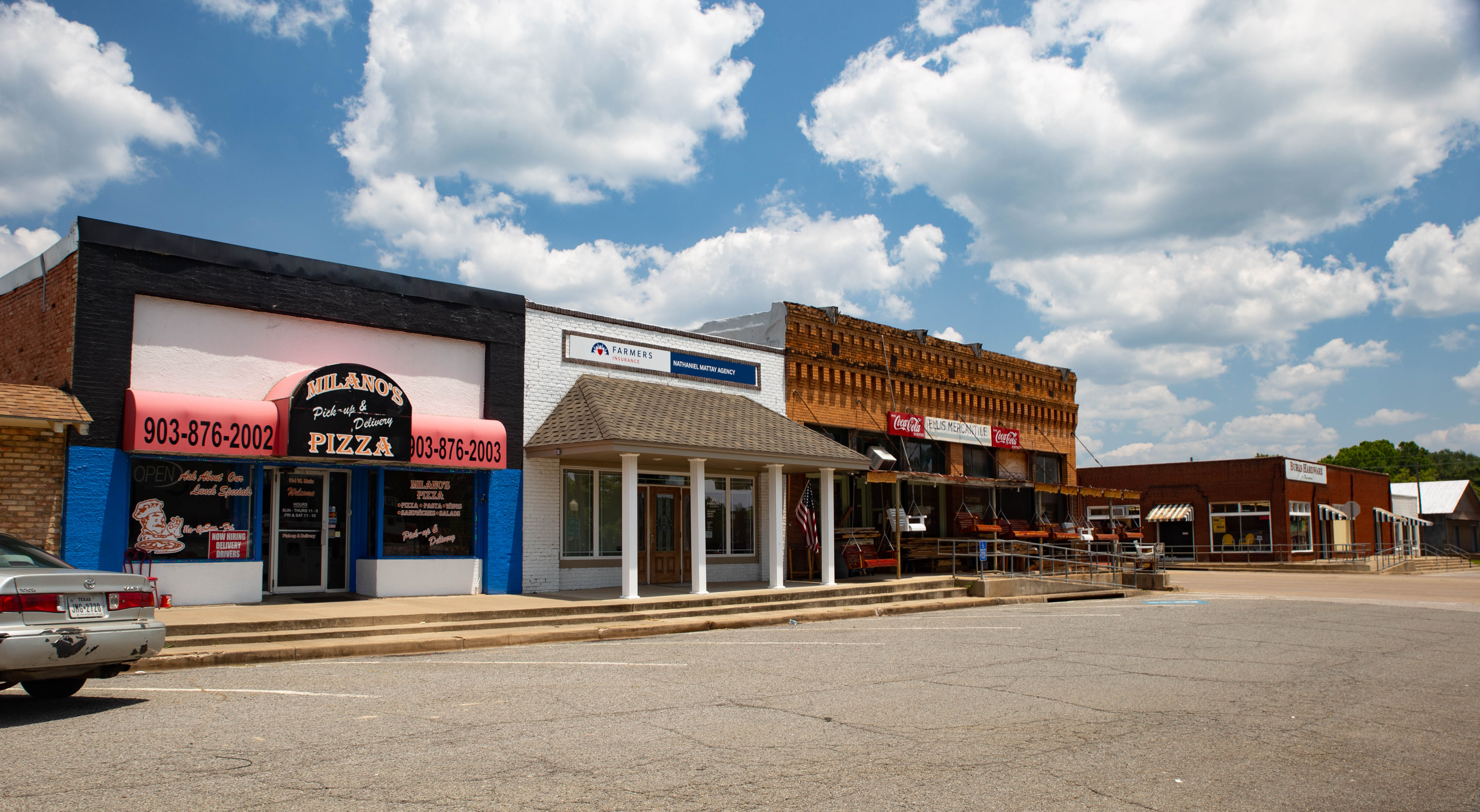
- Downtown Frankston

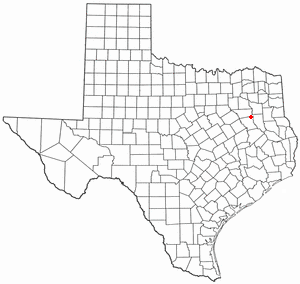
- Location of Frankston, Texas

- Coordinates: 32°03′26″N 95°30′04″W
- Country: United States
- State: Texas
- County: Anderson

Area
  - Total: 2.49 sq mi (6.44 km^{2})
  - Land: 2.48 sq mi (6.42 km^{2})
  - Water: 0.0039 sq mi (0.01 km^{2})
- Elevation: 436 ft (133 m)

Population (2020)
  - Total: 1,126
  - Density: 471.7/sq mi (182.11/km^{2})
- Time zone: UTC-6 (Central (CST))
  - Summer (DST): UTC-5 (CDT)
- ZIP code: 75763
- Area codes: 430, 903
- FIPS code: 48-27300
- GNIS feature ID: 2412653
- Website: www.frankstontexas.com

Frankston is a town in Anderson County, Texas, United States. The county has a population of 1,126 at the 2020 United States census.

== History ==
Two theories are given as to how Frankston derived its name. The one most accepted—and shown on the city's official website—is that Frankston was named for Frankie Miller, a young woman who donated land for the downtown city park. An alternate theory for the name of the town was that Frankston was named after Frank Miller, who owned the land when the railway was built. The Miller house still stands as a historical landmark in the southeastern part of town, on ACR 19. The state bought the land from him and named the city in his honor. The original Main Street still holds the name Miller Street. The junction of Highways 155 and 175 is now the center of the town.

== Geography ==
Frankston is located in northeastern Anderson County at the intersection of U.S. Highway 175 and State Highway 155. According to the United States Census Bureau, the town has a total area of 2.5 square miles (6.4 km^{2}), all land.

The climate in this area is characterized by hot, humid summers and generally mild to cool winters. According to the Köppen climate classification system, Frankston has a humid subtropical climate, Cfa on climate maps.

== Demographics ==
Historical population
Census	Pop.	Note	%±
1920	818		—
1930	1,109		35.6%
1940	1,216		9.6%
1950	1,050		−13.7%
1960	953		−9.2%
1970	1,056		10.8%
1980	1,255		18.8%
1990	1,127		−10.2%
2000	1,209		7.3%
2010	1,229		1.7%
2020	1,126		−8.4%
U.S. Decennial Census

Frankston racial composition as of 2020 (NH = Non-Hispanic) (Note: Note: the US Census treats Hispanic/Latino as an ethnic category. This table excludes Latinos from the racial categories and assigns them to a separate category. Hispanics/Latinos can be of any race.)
Race	Number	Percentage
White (NH)	869	77.18%
Black or African American (NH)	130	11.55%
Native American or Alaska Native (NH)	7	0.62%
Asian (NH)	4	0.36%
Pacific Islander (NH)	1	0.09%
Some Other Race (NH)	4	0.36%
Mixed/Multi-Racial (NH)	54	4.8%
Hispanic or Latino	57	5.06%
Total	1,126	

As of the 2020 United States census, there were 1,126 people, 456 households, and 317 families residing in the town.

According to the 2000 United States census, there were 1,209 people residing in the town of Frankston. Per 2000's census statistics, the racial and ethnic makeup of the town was 86.68% White, 10.92% African American, 0.17% Native American, 0.08% Asian, 0.91% from other races, and 1.24% from two or more races. Hispanics or Latino Americans of any race were 2.81% of the population. By 2020, its non-Hispanic white and Black or African American population remained the majority.

The town's population had a median household income of $46,250 in 2020, up from $28,125 in 2000. About 12.8% of families and 17.1% of the population lived at or below the poverty line, including 14.0% of those under age 18 and 25.6% of those age 65 or over according to the 2000 U.S. census.

== Government ==
Frankston's City Hall building, on the west side of downtown, also includes its police department and an annex for the Anderson County sheriff's department. Frankston is served by a volunteer fire department. Anderson County operates a subcourthouse located on the southwest corner of Frankston's downtown square. The U.S. Postal Service operates a post office at 400 E. Main Street.

== Education ==
Frankston is served by the Frankston Independent School District.

== Transportation ==
- U.S. Highway 175
- State Highway 155
- Farm to Market Road 19

A railroad line operated by the Southern Pacific Railroad (originally built and operated by the Texas & New Orleans Railroad) served Frankston from 1902 until its abandonment in the mid-1980s. The only remaining vestige of the rail line in the city is a building used by the railroad company as a depot; it now serves as Frankston's public library.

== Notable people ==
- Frank Beard, drummer for ZZ Top
- Herbert H. Reynolds, 11th president of Baylor University
