= Kevin Reynolds (director) =

American film director and screenwriter

- Born: Kevin Hal Reynolds; January 17, 1952 (age 74); San Antonio, Texas, U.S.
- Education: Baylor University; University of Southern California
- Years active: 1980–present
- Known for: Film director and screenwriter
- Father: Herbert H. Reynolds

Kevin Hal Reynolds (born January 17, 1952) is an American film director and screenwriter. He directed Robin Hood: Prince of Thieves, Waterworld, The Count of Monte Cristo, Fandango, and the 2016 film Risen. He was nominated for a Primetime Emmy Award for the History miniseries Hatfields & McCoys.

== Early life ==
Reynolds was born in San Antonio, Texas, the son of former Baylor University President Herbert H. Reynolds.

== Career ==
Reynolds enjoyed initial successes co-writing the Cold War hit Red Dawn in 1984 and writing and directing the Steven Spielberg-produced Fandango in 1985.

He began a long friendship with Kevin Costner after hiring him for Fandango, when Costner was a little-known actor. Reynolds later advised Costner behind the scenes for the epic western Dances with Wolves (1990), in particular with the buffalo hunting scenes, on which Reynolds was also an uncredited second unit director. Costner would again be his leading man in Robin Hood: Prince of Thieves (1991). Costner then produced Reynolds' 1994 film Rapa-Nui.

Costner brought on Reynolds to direct the post-apocalyptic film Waterworld (1995). Mid-way through filming, production problems led to conflict between them. It was reported Reynolds walked away near the end of post-production, leaving star/producer Costner to supervise the completion of editing. The two friends stopped speaking; Reynolds was later quoted as having said of Costner: "Kevin should only star in movies he directs. That way he can work with his favorite actor and director". Later, Reynolds and Costner reunited to record a commentary track for the extended special edition DVD of Robin Hood: Prince of Thieves.

Reynolds next directed the dramatic thriller One Eight Seven (1997), which gave Samuel L. Jackson his first top-billed leading role. More recent directorial efforts were two classical adaptations: The Count of Monte Cristo in 2002 and Tristan & Isolde in 2006.

Reynolds directed Costner again in the History miniseries Hatfields & McCoys in 2012. The miniseries was nominated for 16 Primetime Emmy Awards, including one for Reynolds for directing.

In 2013, Reynolds was brought aboard as director for the planned project The Resurrection of Jesus Christ, a film intended as a mystery/thriller and "unofficial sequel" to The Passion of the Christ, depicting the days following Christ's resurrection, with a script written by Paul Aiello. The film is told from the viewpoint of a Roman Tribune, ordered by Pontius Pilate to investigate growing rumors of a risen Jewish messiah, and to locate the missing body of Jesus of Nazareth in order to quell an imminent uprising in Jerusalem. Eventually titled Risen, the film was released in 2016.

== Filmography ==
Short film

Year	Title	Director	Writer
1980	Proof	Yes	Yes

Feature film

Year	Title	Director	Writer
1984	Red Dawn	No	Yes
1985	Fandango	Yes	Yes
1988	The Beast	Yes	No
1991	Robin Hood: Prince of Thieves	Yes	No
1994	Rapa-Nui	Yes	Yes
1995	Waterworld	Yes	No
1997	One Eight Seven	Yes	No
2002	The Count of Monte Cristo	Yes	No
2006	Tristan & Isolde	Yes	No
2016	Risen	Yes	Yes

Television

Year	Title	Notes
1986	Amazing Stories	Episode "You Gotta Believe Me"
2012	Hatfields & McCoys	Miniseries

== Awards and nominations ==
Year	Award	Category	Title	Result
1988	Roxanne T. Mueller Audience Choice Award	Best Film	The Beast	Nominated
1995	Golden Raspberry Awards	Worst Director	Waterworld	Nominated
1997	Tokyo International Film Festival	Grand Prix	One Eight Seven	Nominated
2012	Bronze Wrangler	Western Documentary	Hatfields & McCoys	Won
2012	Directors Guild of America	Outstanding Directing – Television Film	Hatfields & McCoys	Nominated
2012	Online Film & Television Association	Best Direction of a Motion Picture or Miniseries	Hatfields & McCoys	Nominated
2012	Primetime Emmy Awards	Outstanding Directing for a Miniseries	Hatfields & McCoys	Nominated
