= RedState =

American conservative political blog

- Website type: Political blog
- Available in: English
- Owner: Salem Media Group
- Creators: Joshua Treviño, Ben Domenech, and Mike Krempasky
- Website: redstate.com
- Registration: Optional, required to comment
- Launched: 2004; 22 years ago
- Current status: Online

RedState is an American conservative political blog.

Prior to 2017, it organized "RedState gatherings", a summer convention for conservative activists and grassroots political activism which featured many prominent public figures in conservative politics. RedState is owned by the Salem Media Group, a conservative media company.

== History ==
RedState was founded in 2004 as a 527 group by conservative bloggers Joshua Treviño, Ben Domenech, and Mike Krempasky.

In March 2006, co-founder Domenech was hired as a blogger by the Washington Post Online, but was criticised for alleged plagiarism in some of his prior writings during college. At the end of his first week, Domenech resigned, eventually admitting to plagiarism. He took a leave of absence from RedState at the time, to which he returned in July 2006. Erick Erickson, who had joined RedState in 2006, became the editor-in-chief and CEO.

On November 16, 2006, former congressman Tom DeLay posted a diary. Several other members of the House of Representatives and the Senate are regular diarists at RedState.

On December 20, 2006, RedState announced its sale to Eagle Publishing, Inc., effective January 2, 2007. Erickson remained editor-in-chief.

On July 12, 2008, RedState launched a new version of its site, called RS3, introducing new features such as the ability to organize contributor and user diaries by state; action centers allowing users to take action related to emerging political issues; links to share posts via other networking sites such as Facebook, Digg, and MySpace; and easier searching between related content on the Internet.

On August 13, 2011, Texas Governor Rick Perry announced his candidacy for President of the United States at RedState's 2011 RedState Gathering. The Austin American-Statesman reported that this was due to the growing influence of the site and Erickson.

RedState has also created numerous offshoot blogs on specific political topics, including a site opposed to then Senate Judiciary Committee ranking member Arlen Specter and a site supporting the judicial nominees of President George W. Bush.

=== Salem Media Group ===
In January 2014, Eagle Publishing was acquired by Salem Media Group. In October 2015, Erickson announced he would be leaving the site by the end of the year to focus on his radio show. Erickson and Leon Wolf were succeeded by former RedState contributors Caleb Howe and Jay Caruso as managing editor and assistant managing editor respectively.

During the 2016 presidential election, some writers on the blog endorsed Democratic candidate Hillary Clinton for President over Donald Trump. This generated substantial criticism from some conservative organizations. Some commentators such as Ann Coulter, Sean Hannity, and Laura Ingraham argued that the site had abandoned conservatism. The website has also been criticized by Donald Trump while he was a candidate.

== Notable incidents ==
In 2007, RedState banned new contributors who were posting in support of libertarian Ron Paul. The announcement on the blog read, "Effective immediately, new users may *not* shill for Ron Paul in any way shape, form or fashion."

In June 2011, Politico reported that an account executive from Eagle Publishing sent an email advertising a "RedState Endorsement Program Featuring Erick Erickson", including "Erick's Video Endorsement (subject to final approval by Erick)". Erickson said that neither he "nor his boss at Eagle" had seen the email before it went out and that "[his] endorsements are not for sale".

In August 2015, Republican presidential candidate Donald Trump was disinvited from the annual RedState gathering following controversial statements he made about American journalist Megyn Kelly; Kelly was invited to the gathering instead. RedState was then one of the main centers of conservative opposition to Trump's campaign for the Presidency, with most of its writers and editors vocally opposing Trump.

In March 2018, a RedState contributor posted a story questioning whether David Hogg, a 17-year-old survivor in the Parkland school shooting, was actually in the school during the time of the shooting. RedState backtracked later, and the writer of the story apologized. RedState added an "update" to the story, but did not provide a "correction", saying the story was based on confusing reports by other news organizations. The false RedState story was shared widely by prominent conservatives, including Erick Erickson who later deleted social media links he had posted to the erroneous story.

That same month, a RedState contributor wrote an article criticizing Tammy Duckworth's defense of an undocumented immigrant Army veteran who was deported. The RedState article said Duckworth "really doesn't have a leg to stand on"; Duckworth is a veteran who lost both her legs in Iraq in 2004. RedState's assistant editor, Andrea Ruth, who is also a double amputee, revised the statement but there seems to have been no commentary on the change.

In April 2018, there were mass firings of staff at RedState, including of managing editor Caleb Howe. CNN claimed the terminated staff had been deemed insufficiently supportive of President Trump. One of those writers fired was Patrick Frey, who alleged all the terminated staff were "Trump critics". Former RedState founder Erick Erickson also stated how it "seems the dividing line was loyalty to the President".

In January 2019, three senior contributors for RedState resigned, after they noticed that articles for RedState critical about President Trump were not promoted via social media. In an article for TheBulwark.com, Kimberly Ross and Andrea Ruth stated that "it’s hard not to note the irony that Salem Media, a company that targets “audiences interested in Christian and family-themed content and conservative values,” threw its full support behind Donald Trump, a thrice-married lying philanderer who utilized bankruptcy laws and debt to con tenants and contractors out of their money. Salem now promotes anyone who is pro-Trump, even if those people gleefully flout Christian principles."

In June 2019, RedState published an article that promoted murder of Seth Rich conspiracy theories. RedState deleted it on the same day.

In October 2019, RedState published nude photographs of California politician Katie Hill and alleged that she engaged in two extramarital affairs (with a member of her campaign staff and a member of her US House staff). Hill admitted an affair with the campaign staffer, but denied involvement with the House staffer, and the latter allegation became the subject of a House Ethics Committee inquiry. Hill announced her resignation from Congress, describing herself as a victim of revenge porn and calling for the person who distributed nude photographs of her to be punished. Nancy Pelosi, Speaker of the House, said Hill had made "some errors in judgment that made her continued service as a Member untenable." Hill sued RedState and its managing editor in December 2020. Hill was ordered by a judge to pay about $84,000 in attorney's fees for RedState's managing editor in 2021.

In September 2020, it was revealed that a pseudonymous RedState writer, "streiff", worked as a public affairs specialist for the National Institute of Allergy and Infectious Diseases, but wrote RedState pieces attacking White House coronavirus task force member Dr. Anthony Fauci. Bill Crews, "streiff", called Fauci a "mask nazi", and described him as "attention-grubbing and media-whoring." He also suggested that government officials involved in the coronavirus response deserved to be executed.

After the storming of the U.S. Capitol in January 2021, RedState published an article claiming that no "riot", "storming" or "insurrection" took place. RedState later retracted the article.

On February 3, 2021, RedState published an article stating that Alexandria Ocasio-Cortez was not inside the United States Capitol but the Cannon House Office Building during the 2021 storming of the United States Capitol. This story came out one day after Cortez released an Instagram video recounting her experience of hiding in her office bathroom during the attacks on the U.S. Capitol. The RedState article caused wide-ranging accusations against AOC on social media. Snopes found these to be mostly unfounded, noting that Cortez never claimed to have been in the main capitol building during the attack, and the office building Cortez actually found herself in during the attack is in fact part of the Capitol complex and as such was evacuated during the storming of the Capitol.

== See also ==
- Power Line
- Alternative media (U.S. political right)
