= Douglas Domenech =

American politician (born 1955)

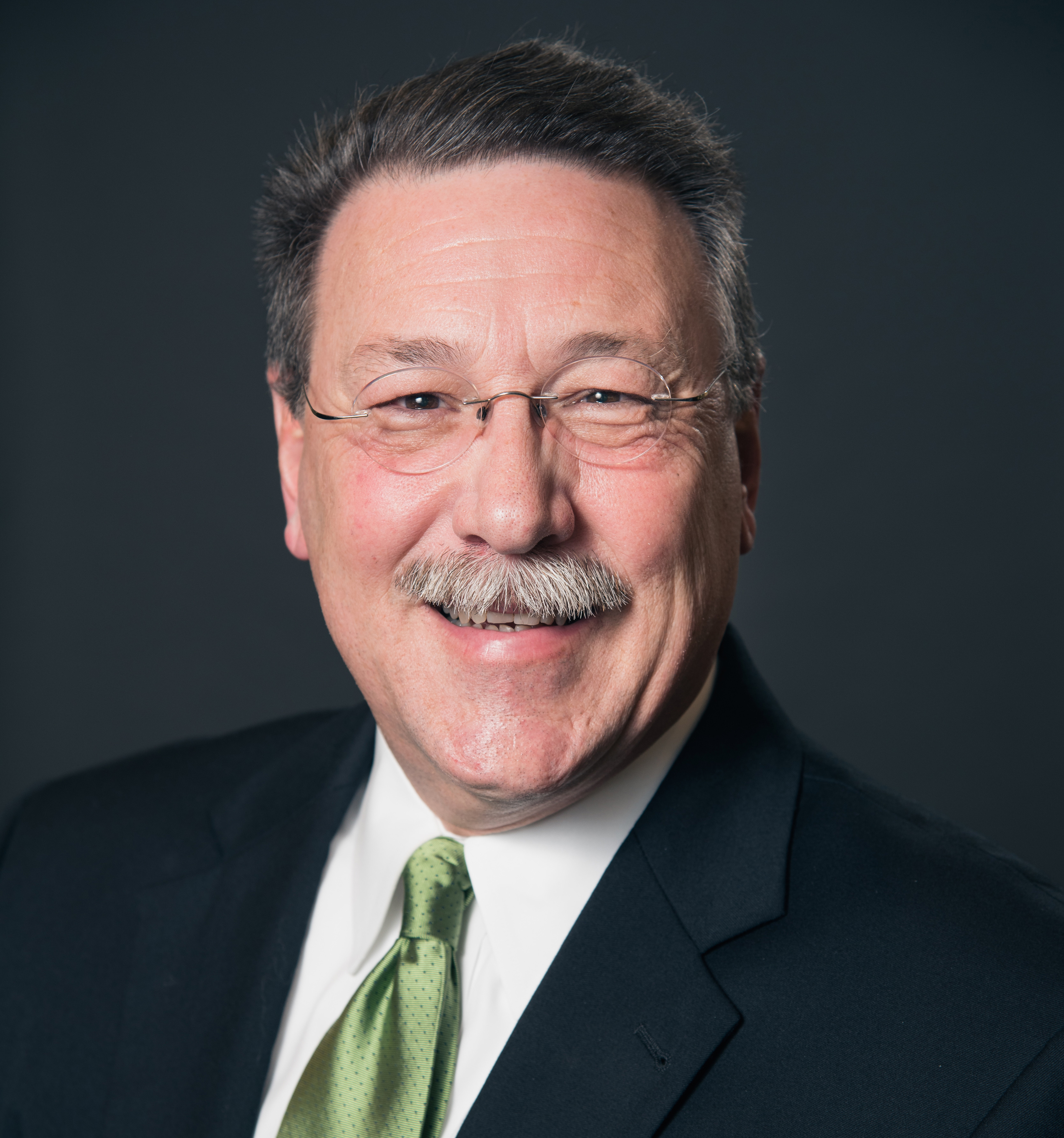
- Official portrait of Domenech

United States Assistant Secretary of the Interior for Insular Areas
- In office September 18, 2017 – January 20, 2021
- President: Donald Trump
- Preceded by: Esther Kia'aina
- Succeeded by: Carmen Cantor

8th Virginia Secretary of Natural Resources
- In office January 16, 2010 – January 11, 2014
- Governor: Bob McDonnell
- Preceded by: Preston Bryant
- Succeeded by: Molly Joseph Ward

Personal details
- Born: Douglas William Domenech; August 5, 1955 (age 70) Georgia, U.S.
- Party: Republican
- Spouse: Jeanne Marie Schram
- Children: 2, including Ben
- Education: Virginia Tech (BS)
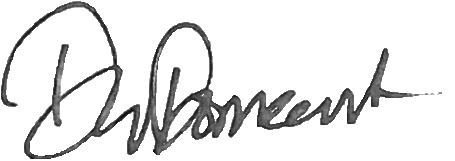
- Signature

Douglas William Domenech (born August 5, 1955) is an American government official who served as the Assistant United States Secretary of the Interior for Insular Areas in the Trump administration from 2017 to 2021. He is a former George W. Bush administration political appointee who served in roles of Deputy Chief of Staff of the United States Department of the Interior, and Senior Advisor to the Secretary of the Interior, as well as having held a position on the White House Working Group on the Political Status of Puerto Rico.

A probe by the Interior Department's Inspector General concluded that Domenech had in 2017 misused his office for personal gain by getting the EPA to hire his son-in-law. Investigators also said that Domenech had used his office to promote another family member's business.

== Early life and education ==
Born August 5, 1955, in Georgia, Douglas W. Domenech grew up in a military family and lived in Panama, the Dominican Republic, and the father's native island of Puerto Rico as a child. His father, John Domenech, served in the United States Army for 30 years and retired as a colonel. His mother, Margaret Jean Heddaeus, was born in Pittsburgh, Pennsylvania and was of German and colonial American ancestry. Domenech graduated from Antilles High School at Fort Buchanan, Puerto Rico, in 1973 and earned a B.S. in forestry and wildlife management at Virginia Tech in 1978. He is the father of blogger and columnist Ben Domenech, who is married to Meghan McCain, a daughter of the late Senator John McCain.

== Career ==
Doug Domenech served in the George W. Bush administration in the Department of the Interior as White House Liaison and as Deputy Chief of Staff.

From 2010 to 2014, Domenech served as Governor Bob McDonnell's Secretary of Natural Resources of the Commonwealth of Virginia, making him the first Hispanic and Puerto Rican person to be appointed to McDonnell's cabinet. Domenech previously worked for the Forest Resources Association.

From March 2015, Domenech was director of the Texas Public Policy Foundation's Fueling Freedom Project, which was a project to fight the Environmental Protection Agency's Clean Power Plan.

Domenech is the Interior Secretary's representative on the Advisory Committee of the Conservation Trust of Puerto Rico.

=== Ethics violation investigation ===
On April 23, 2019, The Washington Post reported that Domenech was one of six officials being investigated for ethics violations by the Interior Department's Office of Inspector General. Domenech was one of six political appointees of the Trump administration at the Interior Department under investigation for having "violated federal ethics rules by engaging with their former employers or clients on department-related business." In 2017 Trump had signed an executive order requiring appointees to recuse themselves for two years on any matters involving their former employers and clients. According to his calendar, on April 6, 2017, Domenech had two meetings with his former employer, the Texas Public Policy Foundation, while the think tank was also a party to lawsuits against the Interior Department. Six months later, one of the lawsuits was settled by the government. Domenech's ethics violation was first uncovered by The Guardian newspaper and later confirmed by the Interior Department's Inspector General.

Political offices
Preceded by Preston Bryant	Virginia Secretary of Natural Resources; 2010–2014	Succeeded by Molly Joseph Ward
