= Shannon Valentine =

American public servant and politician (born 1959)

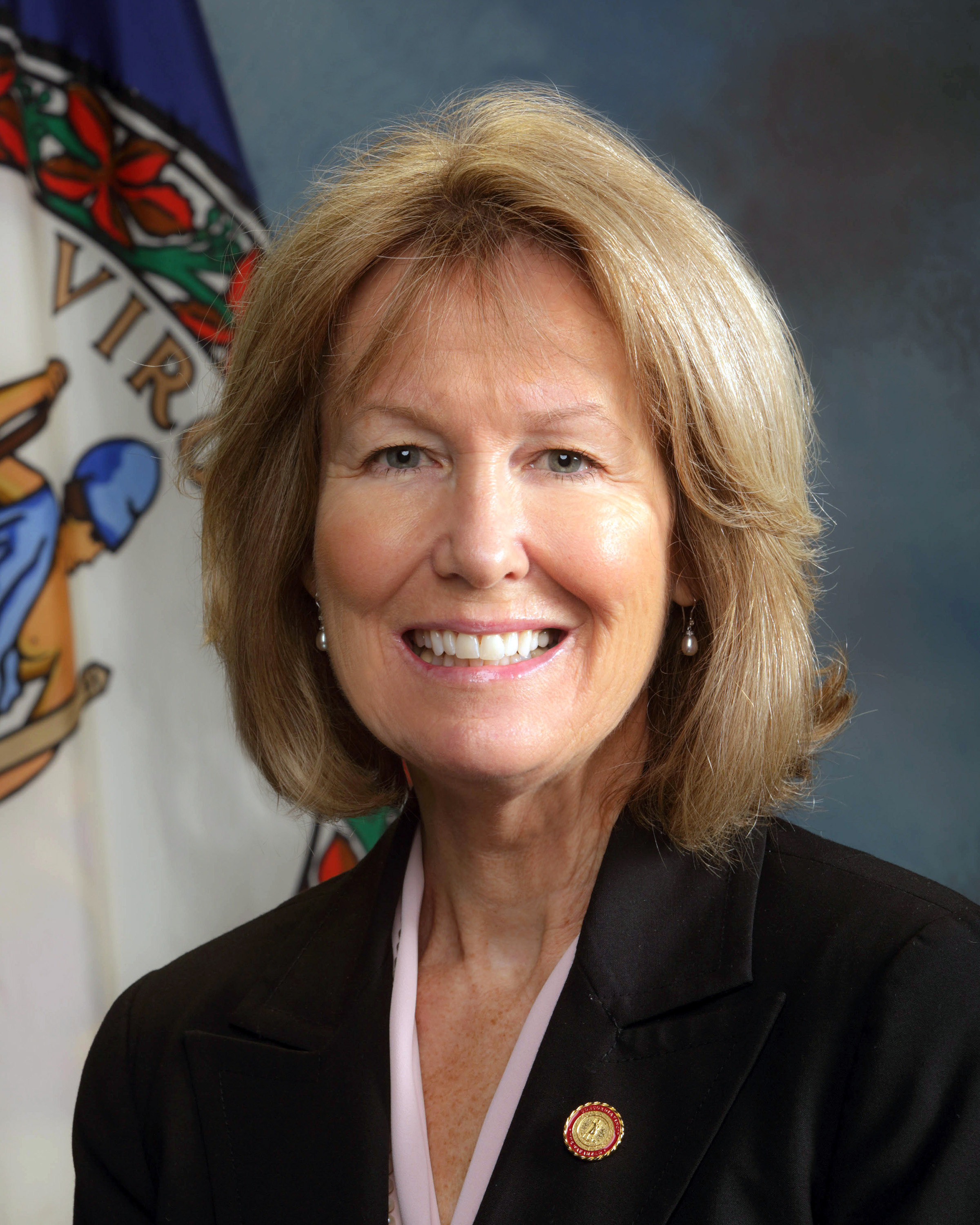
- Official portrait, 2018

14th Virginia Secretary of Transportation
- In office January 16, 2018 – January 15, 2022
- Governor: Ralph Northam
- Preceded by: Aubrey Layne
- Succeeded by: Shep Miller

Member of the Virginia House of Delegates from the 23rd district
- In office January 11, 2006 – January 13, 2010
- Preceded by: Preston Bryant
- Succeeded by: T. Scott Garrett

Personal details
- Born: Shannon White Rutter; January 31, 1959 (age 67) Wilmington, Delaware, U.S.
- Party: Democratic
- Education: University of Virginia (B.A.)

Shannon Rutter Valentine (born January 31, 1959) is an American politician who served as the Secretary of Transportation for Virginia from 2018 to 2022.

== Electoral history ==
Date	Election	Candidate	Party	Votes	%
Virginia House of Delegates, 23rd district
January 10, 2006	Special	Shannon R. Valentine	Democratic	7,887	57.50
January 10, 2006	Special	Michael B. Harrington	Republican	5,817	42.41
January 10, 2006	Special	Write Ins		12	0.09
January 10, 2006	Special	Preston Bryant resigned; seat switched from Republican to Democratic			
November 6, 2007	General	Shannon R. Valentine	Democratic	4,551	95.60
November 6, 2007	General	Write Ins		209	4.39
November 3, 2009	General	T. Scott Garrett	Republican	10,813	50.41
November 3, 2009	General	Shannon R. Valentine	Democratic	10,604	49.44
November 3, 2009	General	Write Ins		31	0.14

== Political career ==
In January 2018, Valentine was appointed Secretary of Transportation by Governor Ralph Northam. As Secretary, she also serves as Chair of the Commonwealth Transportation Board (CTB). She oversaw a $8 billion multimodal transportation system crossing eight agencies with more than 10,000 employees. As Secretary, she also serves as Chair of the Commonwealth Transportation Board (CTB). Valentine served previously in the Virginia House of Delegates 2006–2010, representing the 23rd district, made up of the city of Lynchburg, Virginia and part of Amherst County, serving on the House Transportation and Courts of Justice Committees. Following an assignment as a Director of the Transportation Policy Council in 2013 for then Governor-elect Terry McAuliffe's transition team, Valentine was appointed as the Lynchburg District representative to the CTB in May 2014. During this time, she created the first Regional Connectivity Study in Virginia that correlated transportation decisions with workforce, business expansion and recruitment and investment, covering eight modes of transportation. Her legislative priorities focused on transportation, economic development, education, and ethics. She led bipartisan efforts to create transparent government, expand clean energy production, and invest in intercity passenger rail service for the first time in Virginia's history. She is a member of the Democratic Party.

== Personal life ==
Valentine was born in Wilmington, Delaware, on January 31, 1959, and is married to Dr. Michael Valentine. They have three children. Valentine graduated from the University of Virginia with a bachelor's in economics, elected Phi Beta Kappa. She also graduated from the Sorensen Institute for Political leadership and completed an Education for Ministry certificate course through Sewanee University's School of Theology.

== Awards and accolades ==
Valentine was named the 2017 and 2021 Transportation Woman of the Year by WTS Central Virginia Chapter. She was awarded the inaugural Covington-Richards Legislative Achievement Award by Virginians for High Speed Rail, and named the 2020 Distinguished Public Official Award by the Virginia Transit Association. She has also been honored with the Humanitarian Award by the Virginia Center for Inclusive Communities, Democracy in Action Award by the League of Women Voters, Freedom Fighter Award by the NAACP, Woman of the Year in Government by the YWCA, and the Commonwealth Autism Services Award.
