= Herbert H. Reynolds =

Herbert Reynolds

11th President of Baylor University
- In office 1981–1995
- Preceded by: Abner Vernon McCall
- Succeeded by: Robert B. Sloan

Personal details
- Born: Herbert Hal Reynolds; March 20, 1930 Frankston, Texas, U.S.
- Died: May 25, 2007 (aged 77) Angel Fire, New Mexico, U.S.
- Spouse: Joy Reynolds (m. 1950)
- Children: 3, including Kevin Reynolds
- Education: Trinity University (BA); Baylor University (MA, PhD)

Military service
- Branch/service: United States Air Force
- Years of service: 1948-1968
- Unit: Japan Air Self-Defense Force

Herbert Hal Reynolds (March 20, 1930 – May 25, 2007) was an American academic administrator who worked as the president of Baylor University from 1981 to 1995.

== Early life and education ==
Reynolds was born March 20, 1930, in Frankston, Texas. He graduated from Trinity University in 1952 and received an M.A. in psychology from Baylor University in 1958, followed by a PhD in 1961.

== Career ==
From 1948 to 1968, Reynolds served in the United States Air Force and was an advisor for the Japan Air Self-Defense Force.

From 1956 to 1959, he was an assistant professor at Baylor, and from 1958 to 1961 he was a teaching fellow. In 1961, he became deputy commander and director of research at Aeromedical Research Laboratories in Alamogordo, New Mexico, where he worked on Project Mercury, Project Gemini and Project Apollo. He also worked as an adjunct professor at Baylor and the University of New Mexico. He served as commander and director of plans at the Air Force Human Resources Laboratory in 1968.

In 1969, he became executive vice-president of Baylor University. From 1981 to 1995, he served as its president. Under his leadership, Baylor University expanded significantly, added women's sports programs, and joined the Big Twelve Conference. He also moved to limit the Baptist General Convention of Texas control of the university by changing the university's charter in 1990. He served as its chancellor from 1995 to 2000. From 1994 to 1997, he was a visiting scholar at Wolfson College, Cambridge.

He served as chairman of the National Association of Independent Colleges and Universities and the Independent Colleges and Universities of Texas. From 1995, he was chair of the Texas Commission on Judicial Efficiency and a member of the Texas Select Committee on Higher Education. He was also a trustee of the Baylor College of Medicine, a director of Community Bank and Trust of Waco, and a deacon and former deacon chairman of the First Baptist Church of Waco. He was a 33rd degree Mason.

== Personal life ==
Reynolds and his wife, Joy, married in 1950 and had three children, including director and screenwriter Kevin Reynolds. He died in May 2007. Joy died in April 2022.
