= Joshua Treviño =

American political commentator

Joshua Treviño is an American political commentator and former United States Army officer. He is the chief transformation officer at the Texas Public Policy Foundation. He was a George W. Bush administration speech writer and was a 2006 Lincoln Fellow with the Claremont Institute. He was vice president for public policy at the Pacific Research Institute. He is a graduate of Furman University.

Between 2008 and 2011, Treviño was a consultant for an agency with Malaysian business interests that paid him to write a blog called Malaysia Matters. Treviño earned $389,724.70 under the arrangement. In addition to his blogging activities, Treviño organized the generation and placement of opinion pieces by ten other opinion writers who went on to write pieces about Malaysia. Outlets in which their work appeared included the Huffington Post, the San Francisco Examiner, the Washington Times, National Review, and RedState. When questioned in 2011 by Politico about whether Malaysian interests funded his activities, Treviño flatly denied it: "I was never on any 'Malaysian entity's payroll,' and I resent your assumption that I was."

In 2013, Treviño filed a retroactive statement with the Foreign Registration office of the Department of Justice. He explained the late filing by stating that he was unaware of the requirement. Britain's The Guardian banned him from writing as a result of having failed to disclose his Malaysian ties; a lawyer advised him to contact the Justice Department about filing. Treviño stated, "They let me do a retroactive filing and that was that."
