= Robert B. Sloan =

American academic and theologian (1949–2026)

Robert B. Sloan Jr.

3rd President of Houston Christian University
- In office September 1, 2006 – July 4, 2026
- Preceded by: Edward Douglas Hodo

12th President of Baylor University
- In office 1995–2005
- Preceded by: Herbert H. Reynolds
- Succeeded by: John M. Lilley

1st Dean of George W. Truett Theological Seminary
- In office 1993–1995
- Preceded by: Inaugural holder
- Succeeded by: J. Bradley Creed

Personal details
- Born: February 7, 1949 Coleman, Texas, U.S.
- Died: July 4, 2026 (aged 77)
- Spouse: Sue Collier
- Children: 7
- Education: Baylor University (BA); Princeton Theological Seminary (MDiv); University of Basel, Switzerland (D.Th.)

Robert Bryan Sloan Jr. (February 7, 1949 – July 4, 2026) was an American academic and theologian. He was the president of Houston Christian University from 2006 until his death.

== Early life and education ==
Sloan was born in 1949 in Coleman, Texas, and grew up in Abilene, Texas. He earned his B.A. from Baylor University in 1970, and his M.Div from Princeton Theological Seminary in 1973. After post-graduate research at the University of Bristol, he earned his D.Th., the Doktor der Theologie degree, from the University of Basel, Switzerland, in 1978.

After serving as an adjunct professor at Hardin-Simmons University he was on the faculty of Southwestern Baptist Theological Seminary.

== Career ==
=== Baylor University ===
Sloan joined the Department of Religion faculty at Baylor University in 1983, and was the founding dean of the George W. Truett Theological Seminary.

He served as president of Baylor University from 1995 to 2006, succeeding Herbert H. Reynolds.

In 2002, Sloan unveiled a 42-page plan titled "Baylor 2012," outlining his strategy to transform into a national university with Ph.D. programs and research professors, allowing it "to enter the top tier of American universities while reaffirming and deepening its distinctive Christian mission." His plan included twelve imperatives that were "necessary for Baylor to fulfill the Vision". Opposition to the plan, as well as several controversial financial moves, resulted in Sloan narrowly escaping a 2004 vote to oust him as president, and eventually resigning in 2005. The saga is chronicled in the 2007 book The Baylor Project: Taking Christian Higher Education to the Next Level (ISBN 1587310627).

Following a brief stint as Baylor's Chancellor in 2005–2006, Sloan served as visiting scholar at the University of St Andrews in 2006.

=== Houston Christian University ===
In September 2006, Sloan joined Houston Christian University (then known as Houston Baptist University) as its President.

In 2008 Sloan, along with the board of trustees, approved a 12-year vision document titled "The Ten Pillars: Faith and Reason in a Great City". The purpose of this plan is to enable the university to "fulfill its responsibility for the renewal of Christian Higher Education."

=== Other roles ===
Sloan served on the board of directors for the Houston Symphony and the Greater Houston Partnership in addition to leadership roles on the boards of Memorial Hermann Healthcare Systems - Community Relations, Houston Christian High School, Market Place Chaplains USA, and Orphan Outreach. He was also the publisher of the academic journal, The City. Sloan published his first young adult fantasy book in 2016 and its sequel in February 2017.

== Death ==
On July 3, 2026, Sloan suffered a sudden stroke; he died the following morning on July 4, at the age of 77.

== Publications ==
- Perspectives on John: methods and interpretation in the Fourth Gospel, with Mikeal C. Parsons (1993), ISBN 0-7734-2859-3
- Foundations for Biblical Interpretation: A Complete Library of Tools and Resources, with David S. Dockery and Kenneth A. Mathews (1994), ISBN 0-8054-1039-2
- Romans: Good News for a Troubled World, with Harry Lucenay and Bob Campbell (2000), ISBN 0-9673424-4-9
- Hamelin Stoop: The Eagle, the Cave, and the Footbridge
- Hamelin Stoop: The Lost Princess and the Jewel of Periluna
- Hamelin Stoop: The Ring of Truth
- Hamelin Stoop: The Battle of Parthogen

== See also ==
- Baylor University basketball scandal
