= Robert Yarnall Richie =

American photographer (1908–1984)

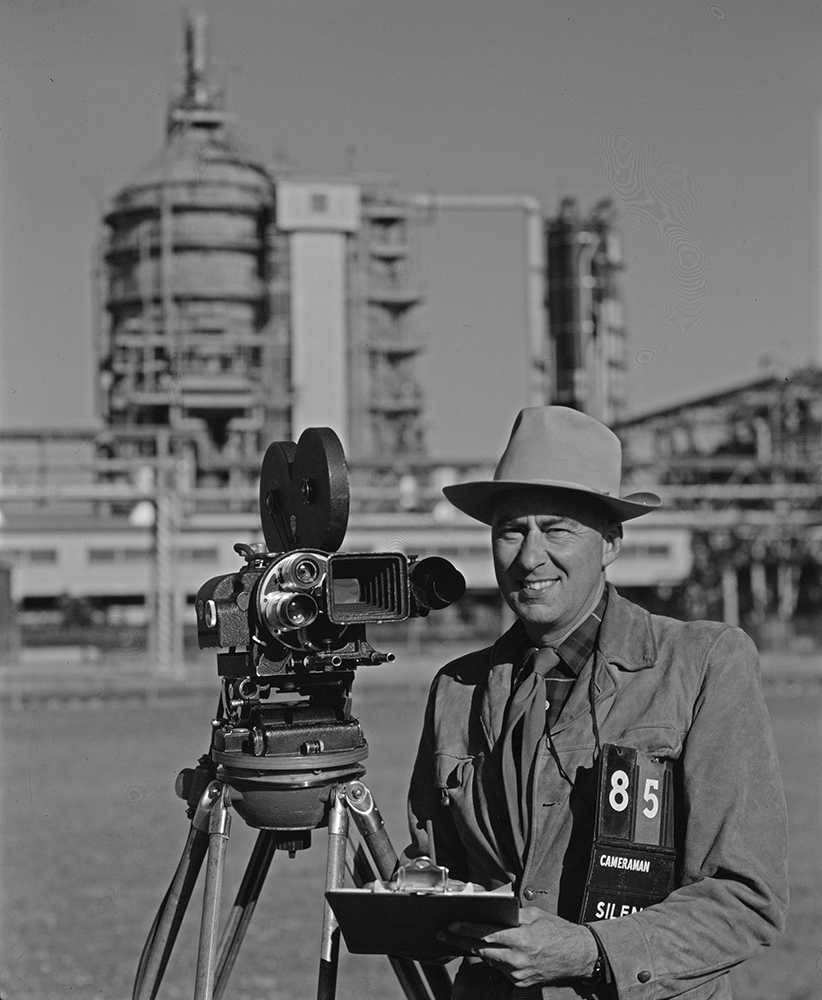
- Self-portrait, 1951
- Born: July 20, 1908; Moorestown
- Died: August 10, 1984 (aged 76)

Robert Yarnall Richie (1908–1984) was an American photographer who worked as a freelance commercial and industrial photographer, in Texas and worldwide. Richie's work is significant for its artistic qualities as well as documentary information. Richie may be best known for his oil production and aviation images in such areas as Texas, Louisiana, the Gulf of Mexico, and Saudi Arabia.

Richie had work published in the magazines Fortune, Time, Life, Scientific American, and National Geographic, and in other publications. He also contributed photos to annual reports for Fortune 500 companies such as General Motors, U.S. Steel, Gulf Oil, and Phelps Dodge.

Richie was an avid pilot, and his life work includes thousands of aerial photographs taken worldwide, as well as many photos of aircraft and other aviation-related subjects.

Many of his photos are collected in the Robert Yarnall Richie Photograph Collection, held by the DeGolyer Library at Southern Methodist University. The SMU archive contains corporate and industrial photographs made by Richie from 1932 to 1975. Many are online, and available at the SMU Central University Libraries Flickr site, at Flickr's The Commons area with no known copyright restrictions.

== Photographs by Robert Yarnall Richie ==
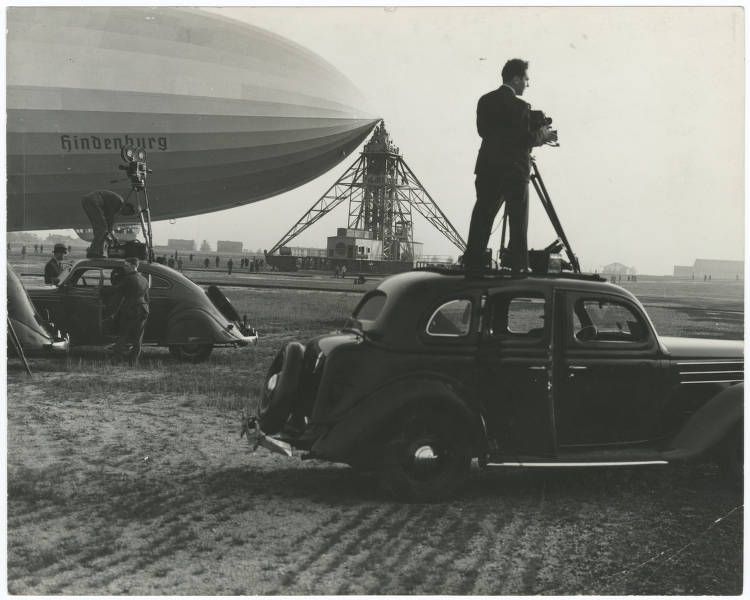
The Hindenburg in 1936

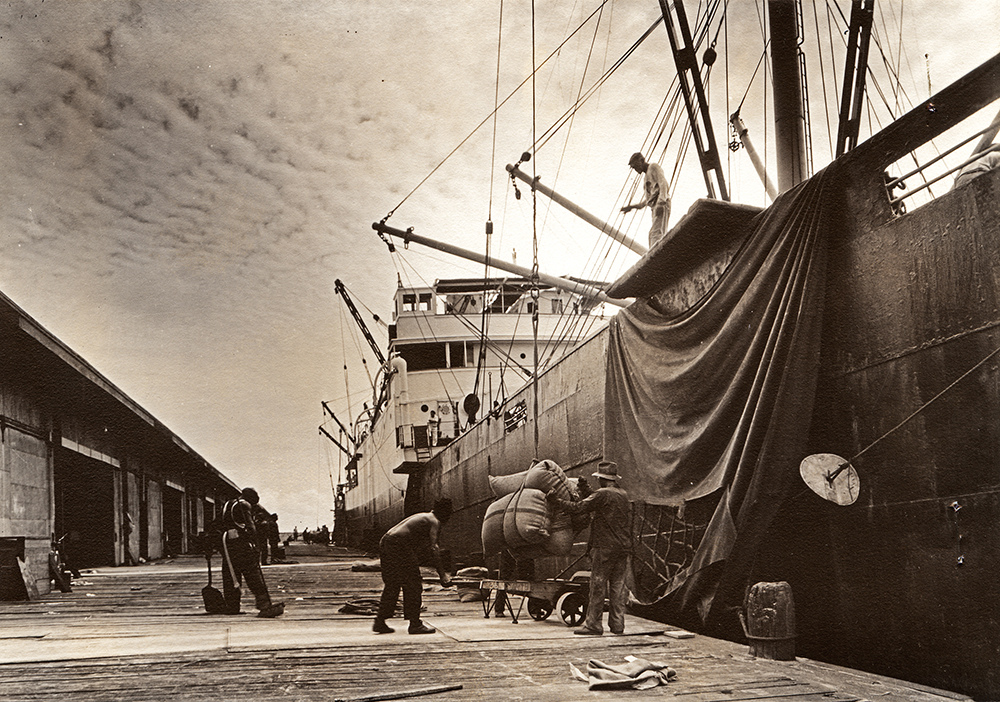
Loading Dock, Galveston Wharf, 1938

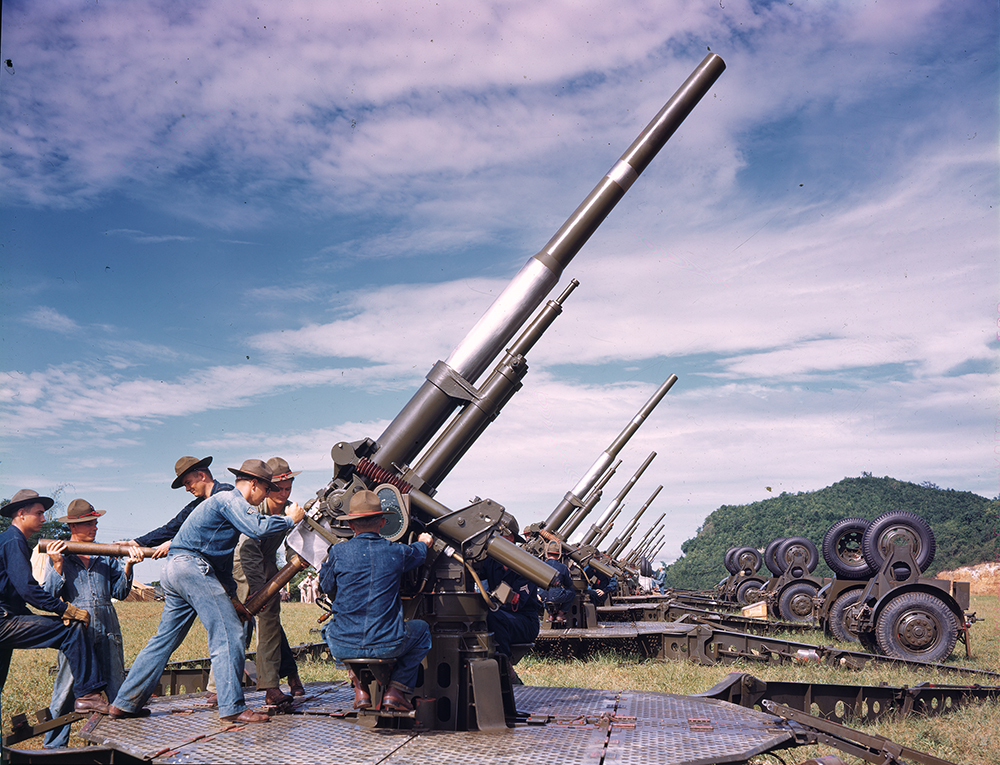
US Army, Puerto Rico, Kodachrome 1939

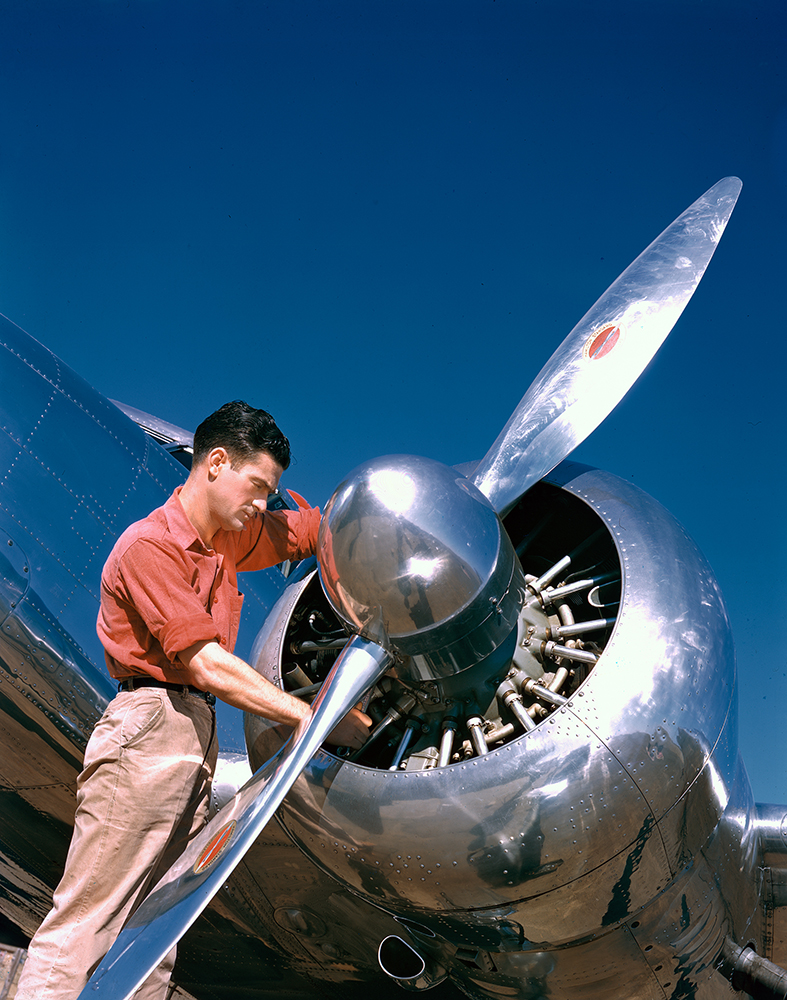
Mechanic with Lockheed Model 12 Electra Junior in 1940

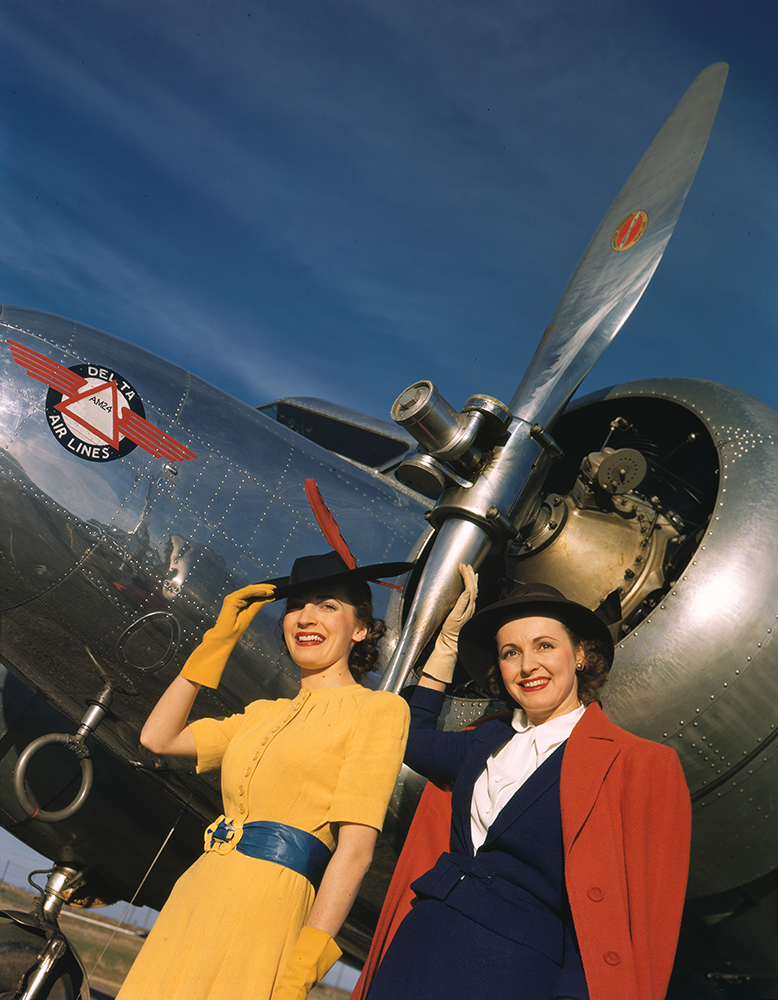
Models with a Delta Air Lines Lockheed Model 10 Electra, 1940

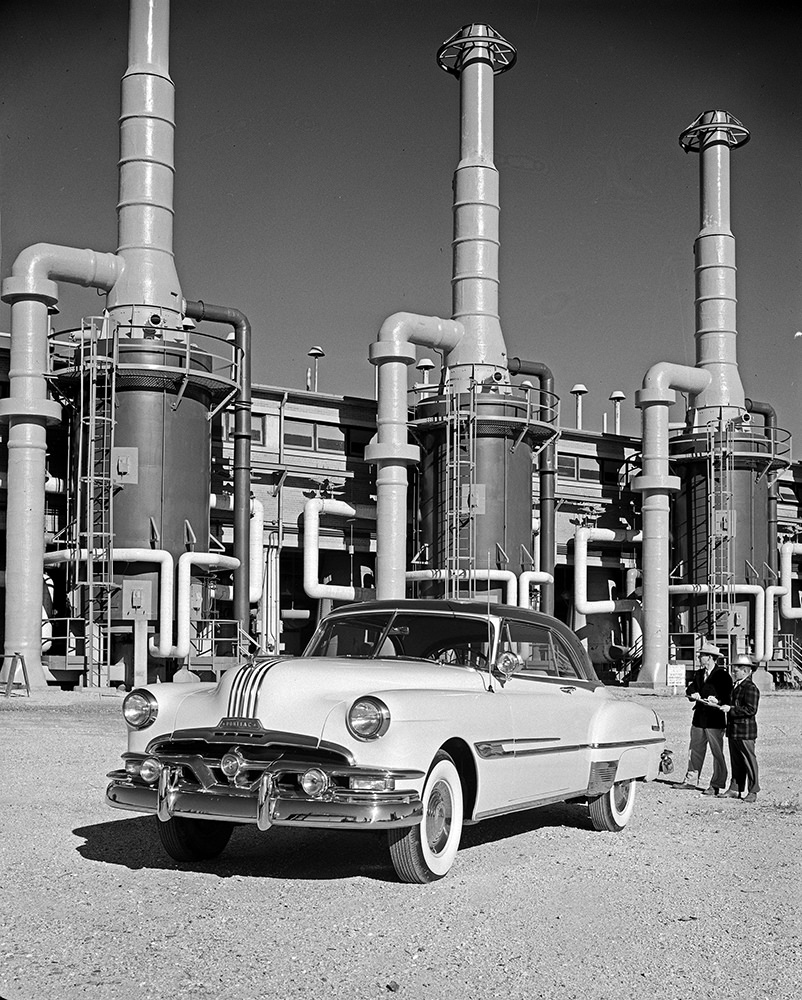
Pontiac Chieftain DeLuxe Catalina, 1952

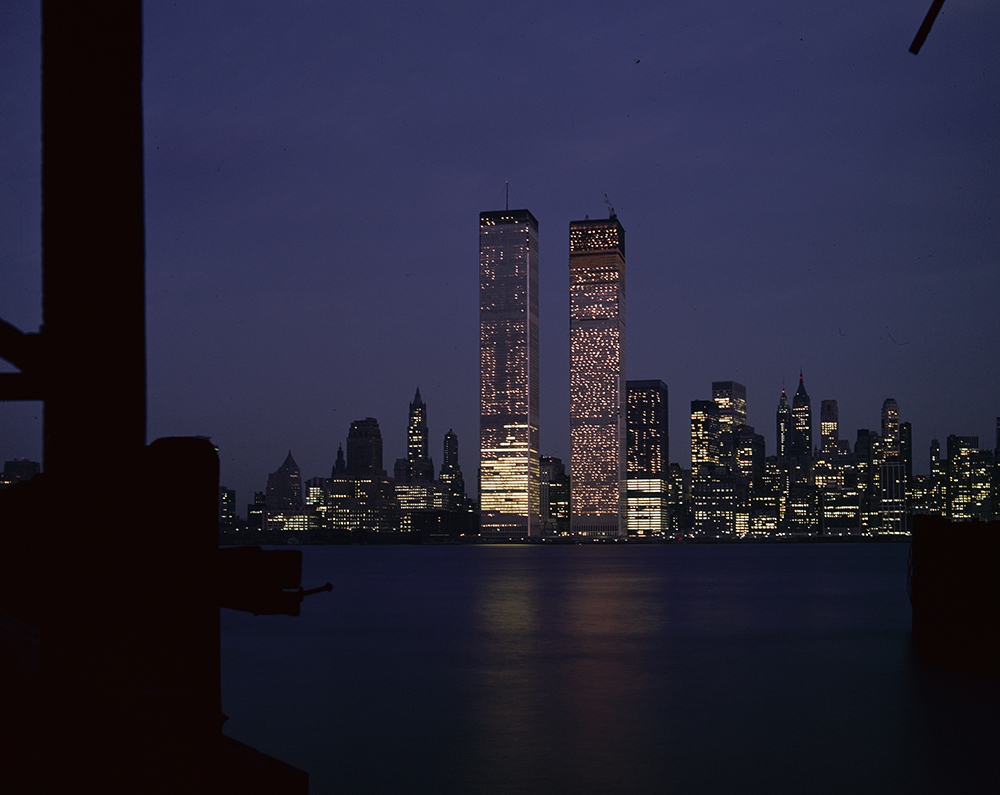
The newly constructed World Trade Center, 1971
