= Virginia Secretary of Natural Resources =

- Seal of the Commonwealth of Virginia

- Flag of Virginia

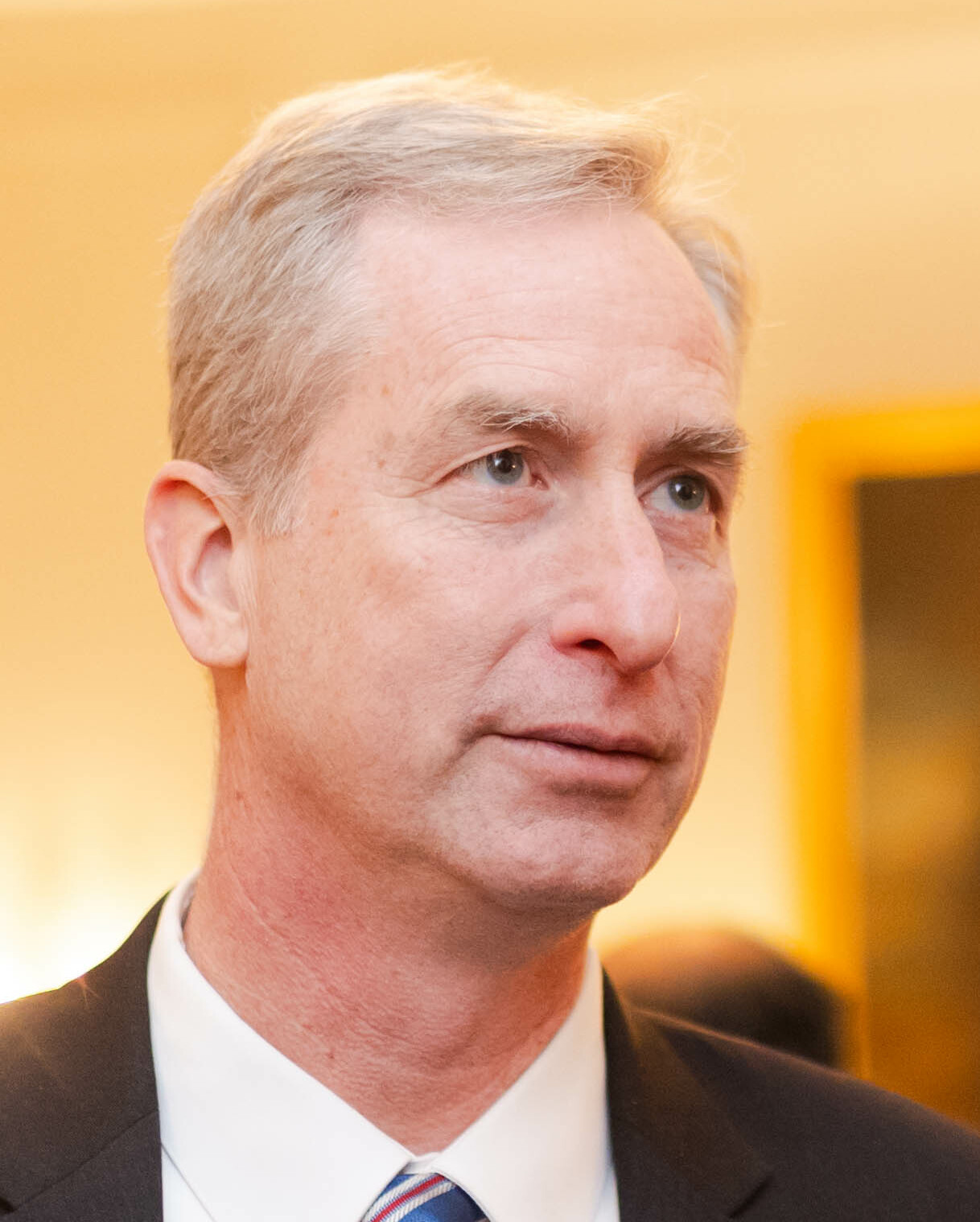
- Incumbent; David Bulova since January 17, 2026
- Style: Mr. Secretary
- Member of: Virginia Governor's Cabinet
- Appointer: The governor; with advice and consent from the General Assembly
- Term length: 4 years
- Inaugural holder: John W. Daniel II
- Formation: July 1986
- Website: naturalresources.virginia.gov

The secretary of natural and historic resources is a member of the Virginia Governor's Cabinet. It was established in 1986 after splitting from the state secretary of commerce (then called the secretary of commerce and resources). The current nominee for secretary is David Bulova, appointed by Governor Abigail Spanberger.

== List of secretaries ==
=== Natural resources (July 1986–present) ===
- John W. Daniel II (1986–1990)
- Elizabeth H. Haskell (1990–1994)
- Becky Norton Dunlop (1994–1998)
- John Paul Woodley Jr. (1998–2001)
- Ron Hamm (2001–2002)
- W. Tayloe Murphy Jr. (2002–2006)
- Preston Bryant (2006–2010)
- Douglas Domenech (2010–2014)
- Molly Joseph Ward (2014–2018)
- Matt Strickler (2018–2021)
- Ann Jennings (2021–2022)
- Andrew R. Wheeler (2022)
- Travis Voyles (2023–2025; acting from 2022–2023)
- Stefanie K. Taillon (2025–2026; acting from February–April 2025)
- David Bulova (2026–present)
