= Assistant Secretary of the Army (Civil Works) =

United States Army office

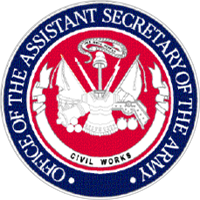
- Seal of the Office of the Assistant Secretary of the Army (Civil Works)

- Flag of an assistant secretary of the Army

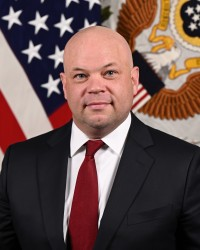
- Incumbent; Adam Telle since August 5, 2025
- United States Department of the Army
- Style: Mr. Secretary; The Honorable (formal address in writing)
- Reports to: Secretary of the Army; Under Secretary of the Army
- Seat: The Pentagon, Arlington County, Virginia, United States
- Nominator: The president with Senate advice and consent
- Term length: No fixed term
- Constituting instrument: 10. U.S.C. § 7016
- Formation: 1975
- First holder: Victor Veysey
- Succession: Joint 18th in SecDef succession in seniority of appointment
- Deputy: Principal Deputy Assistant Secretary of the Army for Civil Works
- Salary: Executive Schedule, Level IV
- Website: Official website

The assistant secretary of the Army (civil works), abbreviated ASA(CW), is an officer of the United States Department of the Army responsible for overseeing civil engineering functions of the United States Army. The assistant secretary of the Army (civil works) reports to the under secretary of the Army, who in turn reports to the secretary of the Army

Functions overseen by the assistant secretary of the Army (civil works) include the civil works of the United States Army Corps of Engineers; control of the United States National Cemetery and the United States Soldiers' and Airmen's Home National Cemetery; and the foreign non-military works of the Army Corps of Engineers. The assistant secretary of the Army (civil works) is the civilian responsible for overseeing the work of the chief of engineers.

The position was created by Section 211 of the Flood Control Act of 1970 and reaffirmed in Section 501 of the Goldwater–Nichols Act of 1986.

== Assistant secretaries of the Army (civil works), 1975–present ==
| Picture | Name | Assumed office | Left office | President appointed by | Secretary served under |
|---|---|---|---|---|---|
| | Victor Veysey | March 1975 | January 1977 | Gerald Ford | Martin Richard Hoffmann |
| | Michael Blumenfeld | April 1979 | January 1981 | Jimmy Carter | Clifford Alexander Jr. |
| | William Gianelli | April 1981 | May 1984 | Ronald Reagan | John Otho Marsh Jr. |
| | Robert K. Dawson | December 1985 | May 1987 | Ronald Reagan | John Otho Marsh Jr. |
| | Robert W. Page | December 1987 | October 1990 | Ronald Reagan; George H. W. Bush | John Otho Marsh Jr. Michael P. W. Stone |
| | Nancy P. Dorn | August 1991 | January 1993 | George H. W. Bush | Michael P. W. Stone |
| | Martin Lancaster | January 1996 | June 1997 | Bill Clinton | Togo D. West Jr. |
| | Joseph W. Westphal | June 1998 | March 5, 2001 | Bill Clinton; George W. Bush | Louis Caldera |
| | Michael Parker | October 2001 | March 2002 | George W. Bush | Thomas E. White |
| | John Paul Woodley Jr. | August 22, 2003 | April 2009 | George W. Bush; Barack Obama | Francis J. Harvey; Pete Geren |
| | Jo-Ellen Darcy | August 7, 2009 | January 20, 2017 | Barack Obama | John M. McHugh; Eric Fanning |
| | R. D. James | February 26, 2018 | January 20, 2021 | Donald Trump | Mark Esper; Ryan D. McCarthy |
| | Jaime A. Pinkham (acting) | April 19, 2021 | November 29, 2021 | Joe Biden | Christine Wormuth |
| | Michael L. Connor | November 29, 2021 | January 20, 2025 | Joe Biden | Christine Wormuth |
| | Robyn S. Colosimo (acting) | January 20, 2025 | March 31, 2025 | Donald Trump | Mark Averill (acting); Daniel P. Driscoll |
| | D. Lee Forsgren (acting) | March 31, 2025 | August 5, 2025 | Donald Trump | Daniel P. Driscoll |
| | Adam Telle | August 5, 2025 | Incumbent | Donald Trump | Daniel P. Driscoll; Adam Telle (acting) |

== Deputy assistant secretaries ==
Reporting to the assistant secretary are:

- Principal Deputy Assistant Secretary of the Army (Civil Works)
  - Deputy Assistant Secretary of the Army (Management and Budget)
  - Deputy Assistant Secretary of the Army (Project Planning and Review)
