= Alliance for Marriage =

The Alliance for Marriage (AFM), founded in 1999, was a non-profit organization based in the United States. The organization described itself as "dedicated to promoting marriage and addressing the epidemic of fatherless families in the United States." The group was founded by Matt Daniels and was headquartered in Virginia. AFM is most known for having drafted the proposed Federal Marriage Amendment (FMA) to the United States Constitution, introduced originally by Rep. Ronnie Shows (D-MS). The amendment would define marriage in the United States as the union of one man and one woman. The amendment was later renamed the Marriage Protection Amendment, which, as of 2014, last failed a Senate cloture motion in June 2006. The organization was defunct as of May 2021, although its website, with a rarely-updated blog, remained active until at least October 2020.

== Founder ==
In a 2004 profile in USA Today, Daniels claimed diverse support for the AFM, crediting it to his upbringing. He was raised by a single mother in Spanish Harlem:

Daniels' views on family, he says, are based in large part on personal experience. He insists he wants to protect what he did not have himself: a dad who stuck around to raise him in a traditional family.

Daniels was profiled in the Los Angeles Times, The Atlantic, and USA Today.

== Federal Marriage Amendment ==
The FMA as introduced in 2002 consisted of two sentences:

Marriage in the United States of America shall consist only of the union of a man and a woman. Neither this constitution or the constitution of any state, nor state or federal law, shall be construed to require that marital status or the legal incidents thereof be conferred upon unmarried couples or groups.

and was first debated in the Senate on July 14, 2004. The Federal Marriage Amendment was considered a significant issue in the 2004 presidential election. The Senate last attempted a cloture motion on the Amendment in June 2006, which failed 48-50, short of the necessary 60 votes. Later in 2006, the Alliance for Marriage announced they were shifting their focus toward building a network of state lawmakers who would support the Federal Marriage Amendment.

== See also ==
- Same-sex marriage in the United States
- Same-sex marriage legislation in the United States
