= Matthew Daniels =

American academic and conservative activist

- Born: New York City
- Education: Dartmouth College; University of Pennsylvania Law School; Brandeis University
- Occupations: Academic, political activist

Matthew Daniels is an American academic and human rights scholar.

In the late 1990s and through the 2000s, Daniels campaigned against the proposed recognition of same-sex marriage in the United States, which he viewed as a threat to the traditional family. Daniels led the drafting of the proposed Federal Marriage Amendment and unsuccessfully lobbied for its passage during the administration of President George W. Bush.

He teaches at The Institute of World Politics where he is the Chair of Law and Human Rights and founder of the Center for Human Rights and International Affairs.

== Early life and education ==
Daniels was born in 1963 in Spanish Harlem, New York City. His father was Guy Daniels, a poet and translator of Russian literature.

Daniels has described his childhood as "miserable"; his father deserted Daniels' mother when he was a toddler. She continued to raise him in Spanish Harlem, working as a secretary. In 1971, she was assaulted by four men, leaving her with a broken back. She was unable to work and went on welfare, and became depressed and alcoholic.

Daniels states that his close relationship with his Black half-brother gave him a firsthand look at racial discrimination. After college, Daniels worked for homeless services run by Black churches, and under their influence became a born-again Christian. These churches also heavily influenced his view of marriage and family and homosexuality.

Daniels earned a scholarship to Dartmouth College. He graduated from Dartmouth in 1985, the University of Pennsylvania Law School in 1993, and earned a Ph.D. in politics from Brandeis University in 2003.

== Career ==
=== 1990s ===
After graduating from Penn Law, in 1996, Daniels became the director of the Massachusetts Family Institute in Boston, affiliated with social conservative activist and author James Dobson. Daniels' work stressed the importance of fathers; he commissioned research demonstrating the negative impacts of single-mother families and advocated making divorce more difficult to obtain. "Above all," according to The Atlantic in 2004, Daniels "dedicated himself to opposing gay marriage, which he sees as the biggest threat to the traditional family."

Daniels cited his childhood without a reliable father figure as a reason for his opposition to same-sex marriage. He told USA Today that he is not anti-gay, but rather, wanted to make sure that children have both a mother and father, which recognition of same-sex marriage would jeopardize. The Atlantic in 2004 noted that while highly critical of gay marriage, he was "careful not to condemn gays themselves" and generally avoided working closely with leading social conservatives because of their polarizing language.

Daniels was a founder of the Alliance for Marriage in 1999. He was troubled by legal developments in states like Vermont and Hawaii, fearing the prospect of gay marriage legalized through the judiciary (Hawaii's Supreme Court delivered the first major legal victory to American gay marriage advocates in 1993; see Baehr v. Miike). Daniels' concerns led him to believe that only a constitutional amendment could prevent this.

=== 2000s and Federal Marriage Amendment ===
In 2001, Daniels led the drafting of the Federal Marriage Amendment through the Alliance for Marriage, working with conservative legal scholars, including former Supreme Court nominee Robert Bork, Robert P. George, and Gerard V. Bradley, over several months in the spring and summer. It was announced in July, and the profile of the Alliance was raised significantly, as was its fundraising intake. Daniels presented it to President George W. Bush that year.

According to Daniels, the Amendment was crafted so as to prohibit same-sex marriages but allow room for civil unions and other similar arrangements, which had been established in states like California at the time. (Some co-authors disagreed; Robert George and Gerard Bradley maintained that it would also prohibit at least some forms of non-marriage unions for same-sex couples.)

The draft Amendment did not gain much momentum initially. At the time, it was considered by some conservatives moot because of their established victory with the 1996 Defense of Marriage Act. Activists were generally more concerned with stem cell research, and the September 11 attacks further realigned political priorities away from other social issues.

Daniels continued to lobby for the draft to be taken up in Congress. He convinced conservative Mississippi Democratic congressman Ronnie Shows to introduce the draft amendment as a bill in May 2002. 22 co-sponsors signed on, but the bill did not advance in the House of Representatives. Shows lost his subsequent election; Daniels then worked with Republican freshman from Colorado Marilyn Musgrave, who introduced the bill again on May 21, 2003, but it received less support than the previous year.

By late 2003, gay marriage had become a major national political concern. The month after Musgraves introduced the bill, Canada began issuing marriage licenses to gay couples (specifically, in Ontario; see same-sex marriage in Canada), and shortly thereafter the United States Supreme Court struck down anti-sodomy laws in Lawrence v. Texas. Finally, Massachusetts became the first state to legalize gay marriage in November after a decision by its Supreme Court.

Daniels became controversial among American social conservative activists who did not like the Federal Marriage Amendment's allowance of civil unions and Daniels' de-emphasis of homosexuality as a Biblical sin. Many of these critics, including James Dobson and Reverend Jerry Falwell, coalesced around the Arlington Group. The Wall Street Journal reported that most of those opposed were eventually persuaded by Daniels and Musgrave to accept the proposed amendment on the grounds that more strict prohibitions of civil unions would be politically impossible to pass.

Going into the 2004 presidential elections, President Bush sought to court socially conservative voters by taking a formal stance against gay marriage while being able to position himself as a relative moderate. In January 2004, the Bush campaign thus embraced Daniels and the Alliance for Marriage position and formally backed the FMA.

The Federal Marriage Amendment failed in the Senate with 47 votes, 19 fewer than needed to pass a constitutional amendment. Daniels vowed to continue the fight, stating that the bill had already succeeded in raising public awareness and getting politicians on the record in the run up to the 2004 elections. Daniels continued to campaign in support of the amendment in 2006, which was also defeated in both the House and Senate.

Daniels' activism also drew intense criticism from gay rights' activists and civil rights organizations like the American Civil Liberties Union and Human Rights Campaign, both of which strongly opposed the Federal Marriage Amendment.

Daniels is creator and producer of the Human Rights Network, a digital public education campaign to promote human rights awareness through entertainment media. Daniels also launched the Digital Human Rights Ambassador Program at the University of Costa Rica.

=== GreatAmericans.com ===
Daniels was a director of GreatAmericans.com, founded in 2008. The project was unrelated to his previous activism and focused on highlighting "positive role models" such as military service members, firefighters, and police officers. The site was an affiliate of the Funny or Die network with support from Sequoia Capital. The website now redirects to the group's YouTube channel.

=== Human rights ===
Daniels is the Chair of Law and Human Rights at the Institute of World Politics in Washington, D.C. He is also an adjunct professor at Handong International Law School, Handong Global University. He has founded a number of projects that focus on promoting human rights. Daniels founded Human Liberty, a non-profit to raise awareness of extreme human rights violations in countries such as North Korea.

Daniels is the author of Human Liberty 2.0: Advancing Universal Rights in the Digital Age. He has published opinion pieces on threats to digital privacy, women's rights in Afghanistan, and against the use of torture as antithetical to democracy.
