= Victor Veysey =

American politician

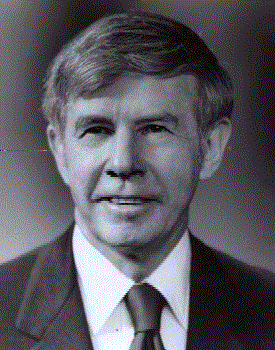

1st Assistant Secretary of the Army (Civil Works)
- In office March 1975 – January 1977
- President: Gerald Ford
- Preceded by: None
- Succeeded by: Michael Blumenfeld

Member of the U.S. House of Representatives from California
- In office January 3, 1971 – January 3, 1975
- Preceded by: John V. Tunney
- Succeeded by: James F. Lloyd (redistricting)
- Constituency: 38th district (1971–73); 43rd district (1973–75)

Member of the California State Assembly from the 75th district
- In office January 7, 1963 – January 3, 1971
- Preceded by: Richard T. Hanna
- Succeeded by: Raymond T. Seeley

Personal details
- Born: Victor Vincent Veysey; April 14, 1915 Los Angeles, California, U.S.
- Died: February 13, 2001 (aged 85) Hemet, California, U.S.
- Resting place: Riverview Cemetery; Brawley, California, U.S.
- Party: Republican
- Spouse: Janet Donaldson (m. 1940)
- Children: 4

Military service
- Branch/service: United States Navy
- Battles/wars: World War II]

Victor Vincent Veysey (April 14, 1915 – February 13, 2001) was an American Republican politician who represented California in the United States House of Representatives for two terms from 1971 to 1975. From 1975 to 1977, he served as Assistant Secretary of the Army under President Gerald Ford.

== Education ==
Born in 1915 in Los Angeles, California, Veysey grew up in Brawley and Eagle Rock, graduating from Eagle Rock High School. He received a BS in civil engineering from Caltech in 1936 and an MBA from Harvard University in 1938. He also did graduate work at Stanford University.

== Career ==
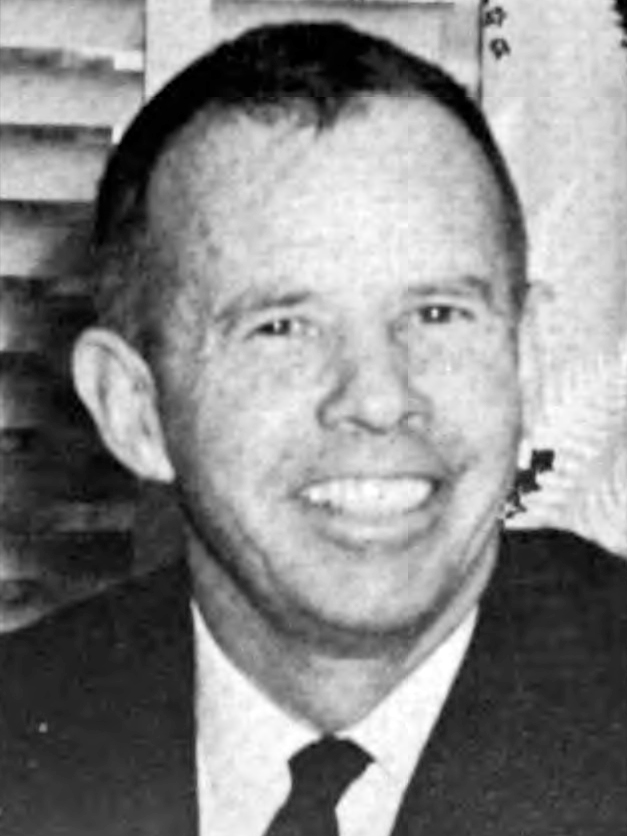
Veysey as a State Assemblymember in 1963.

Veysey was a professor at Caltech from 1938 to 1940 and from 1941 to 1946, and at Stanford University from 1940 to 1941.

He subsequently moved to the Imperial Valley where he farmed.

=== Commissions and school boards ===
He became a member of the Brawley School Board in 1955, a member of the Imperial Valley College Board in 1960 and a member of the U.S. Department of Agriculture Advisory Commission in 1959.

=== State senate ===
In 1962 Veysey was elected to the California State Assembly for the 75th district serving from 1963 to 1971.

=== Congress ===
In 1970 he was elected to Congress and reelected in 1972. He was a delegate to the 1972 Republican National Convention. In the Watergate year of 1974, he was narrowly defeated by Democratic West Covina Mayor James F. Lloyd.

=== Ford administration ===
Between 1975 and 1977 he was Assistant Secretary for Civil Works for the U.S. Army.

In 1983, he was Secretary for Industrial Relations for the State of California.

== Death ==
Veysey died in 2001 while living in Hemet and is buried at Riverview Cemetery, in Brawley.

== Electoral history ==
1970 United States House of Representatives elections in California
Party	Candidate	Votes	%
Republican	Victor Veysey	87,479	49.8
Democratic	David A. Tunno	85,684	48.8
American Independent	William E. Pasley	2,481	3.4
Total votes		175,644	100.0
Republican gain from Democratic			

1972 United States House of Representatives elections in California
Party	Candidate	Votes	%
Republican	Victor Veysey (Incumbent)	117,781	62.7
Democratic	Ernest Z. Robles	70,129	37.3
Total votes		187,910	100.0
Republican win (new seat)			

1974 United States House of Representatives elections in California
Party	Candidate	Votes	%
Democratic	James F. Lloyd	60,709	50.3
Republican	Victor Veysey (Incumbent)	60,102	49.7
Total votes		120,811	100.0
Democratic gain from Republican			

U.S. House of Representatives
Preceded by John V. Tunney	Member of the U.S. House of Representatives from California's 38th congressional district 1971–1973	Succeeded by George Brown, Jr.
New district	Member of the U.S. House of Representatives from California's 43rd congressional district 1973–1975	Succeeded by Clair Burgener
Government offices
Preceded by New Office	Assistant Secretary of the Army (Civil Works); March 1975–January 1977	Succeeded by Michael Blumenfeld
