= Martin Lancaster =

American politician from North Carolina

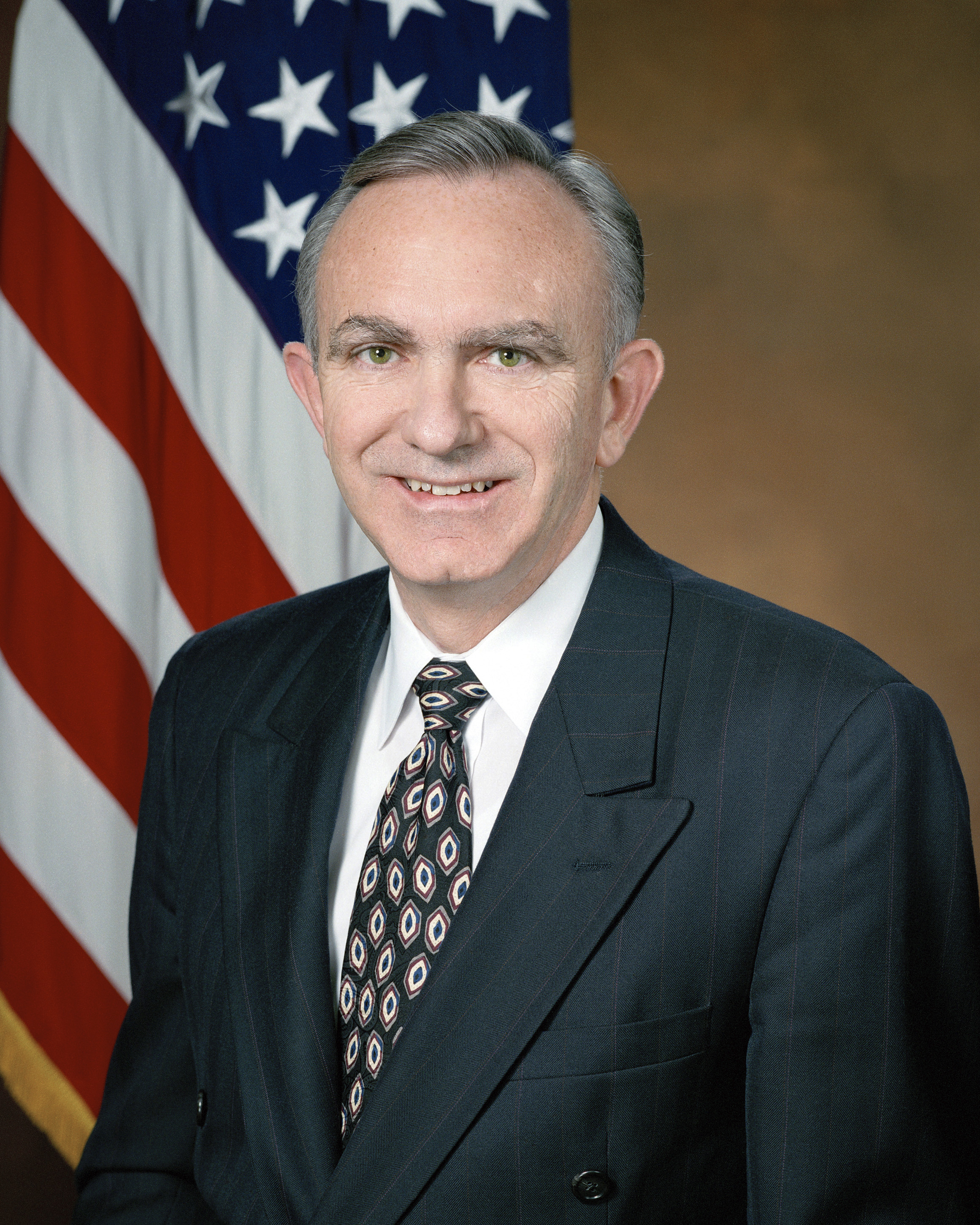

President of the North Carolina Community College System
- In office 1997–2007
- Preceded by: Lloyd V. Hackley
- Succeeded by: Scott Ralls

Assistant Secretary of the Army for Civil Works
- In office January 1996 – June 1997
- President: Bill Clinton
- Preceded by: Nancy P. Dorn
- Succeeded by: Joseph W. Westphal

Member of the U.S. House of Representatives from North Carolina's 3rd district
- In office January 3, 1987 – January 3, 1995
- Preceded by: Charles O. Whitley
- Succeeded by: Walter B. Jones Jr.

Member of the North Carolina House of Representatives
- In office January 1, 1979 – January 1, 1987
- Preceded by: Nancy Winbon Chase
- Succeeded by: John Kerr III
- Constituency: 9th district (1979–1983); 11th district (1983–1987)

Personal details
- Born: Harold Martin Lancaster; March 24, 1943 (age 83) Wayne County, North Carolina, U.S.
- Party: Democratic
- Education: University of North Carolina, Chapel Hill (BA, JD)
- Awards: Order of the British Empire (officer, 2011)

Military service
- Allegiance: United States
- Branch/service: United States Navy; United States Air Force
- Years of service: 1967–1970 (active); 1970–1993 (reserve)
- Rank: Captain
- Unit: Navy Judge Advocate General's Corps
- Battles/wars: Vietnam War

Harold Martin Lancaster, O.B.E. (born March 24, 1943) is an American politician who is the former President of the North Carolina Community College System and former Chair of the National Council of State Directors of Community Colleges. He was also United States Representative from North Carolina from 1987 to 1995.

== Life and career ==
Lancaster was raised on a tobacco farm in rural Wayne County, North Carolina and spent his childhood working in the fields; he went to the small local school and participated in local church youth activities. In 1957, he served as a Page in the North Carolina House of Representatives and in 1959, as Chief Page.

In 1961, Lancaster went to the University of North Carolina at Chapel Hill, and entered the law school at UNC after his junior year in college as a Law Alumni Scholar, graduating in 1967.

After graduating, he joined the United States Navy, serving on active duty as a judge advocate for three years, eighteen months of which were spent on the USS Hancock (CV-19) off the coast of Vietnam. Lancaster continued to serve as a reservist until 1993.

After his military service he returned to North Carolina and set up a law practice with a college classmate. In 1977, Governor Jim Hunt appointed him Chairman of the North Carolina Arts Council, a position he held for four years. This led to elective office, first to eight years in the North Carolina House of Representatives and ultimately to the U.S. Congress.

In Congress, he served on the Armed Services, Small Business, Agriculture, and Merchant Marine & Fisheries Committees. His major committee was Armed Services. Lancaster also represented the House for six years at the Chemical Weapons Convention negotiations in Geneva.

Lancaster was reelected three times without serious difficulty. However, in 1994 he faced a very credible Republican challenger in Walter B. Jones, Jr., a former Democratic state Representative who had recently switched parties. Lancaster's district had absorbed a large amount of the territory once represented by Jones' father, Walter B. Jones, Sr., in the 1990s round of redistricting. The race was initially fairly close until Walter, Jr. circulated a picture of Lancaster jogging with Bill Clinton, whose socially liberal stances (especially on allowing gays in the military) had angered voters in this socially conservative Eastern North Carolina district. In the general election, Jones defeated Lancaster by almost six points—one of many moderate Democrats in the South to be defeated in the Republican landslide that year.

Lancaster worked briefly for Governor Jim Hunt handling federal issues. President Clinton then asked that he assist him with the ratification of the Chemical Weapons Convention, which he accepted. In the fall of 1995, the president nominated Lancaster to become Assistant Secretary of the Army for Civil Works, a position for which the U.S. Senate confirmed him in January 1996. In this capacity, Lancaster was primarily responsible for policy development and advocacy for the Army Corps of Engineers before the Office of Management and Budget, the White House, and the Congress.

In 1997, Lancaster was chosen President of the North Carolina Community College System. Lancaster sought to increase state and private funding for facilities, equipment, faculty salaries and instruction and to strengthen the system's essential role in workforce and economic development. He led community college participation in the successful Higher Education Bond referendum of 2000, which included $600 million for community college construction, repair and renovation. He focused particular efforts on increasing the role of community colleges in preparing "homegrown teachers" for public schools and in workforce training for biotechnology and other high–tech industries. In the summer of 2003, he was elected Chair of the National Council of State Directors of Community Colleges.

In March 2007, Lancaster announced that he would retire as system president in the spring of 2008. After the announcement, a column in the (Raleigh) News and Observer praised his service, comparing him to former UNC system president William C. Friday. The columnist wrote that "Lancaster has well-served all of the [colleges] by making it clear to legislators that community colleges are a key, perhaps the key, to the state's economic growth and recruitment of jobs." He was named President Emeritus of the community college system in April 2008.

In March 2008, Lancaster announced that in September he would be joining the largest law firm in Raleigh, North Carolina, Smith Anderson Blount Dorsett Mitchell & Jernigan. He will serve in an "of counsel" position with the firm, concentrating in regulatory and administrative law.

In February 2009, Lancaster joined Dawson & Associates in Washington, DC as a senior advisor on Federal transportation and environmental policy.

Lancaster was made an Honorary Officer of the Most Excellent Order of the British Empire by Queen Elizabeth II in 2011, for his services to the people of Northern Ireland.

U.S. House of Representatives
Preceded by Charles O. Whitley	Member of the U.S. House of Representatives from North Carolina's 3rd congressional district 1987–1995	Succeeded by Walter B. Jones Jr.
Government offices
Preceded by Nancy P. Dorn	Assistant Secretary of the Army for Civil Works; 1996–1997	Succeeded by Joseph W. Westphal
U.S. order of precedence (ceremonial)
Preceded by Kathleen Rice as Former U.S. Representative	Order of precedence of the United States as Former U.S. Representative	Succeeded by George Holding as Former U.S. Representative
