= William Gianelli =

American engineer and public servant (1919–2020)

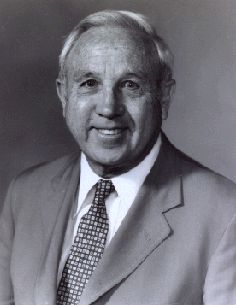

3rd United States Assistant Secretary of the Army for Civil Works
- In office April 1981 – May 1984
- President: Ronald Reagan
- Preceded by: Michael Blumenfeld
- Succeeded by: Robert K. Dawson

Personal details
- Born: February 19, 1919 Stockton, California, U.S.
- Died: March 30, 2020 (aged 101) Monterey, California, U.S.
- Party: Republican
- Education: University of California, Berkeley
- Occupation: Engineer & public official

William Reynolds Gianelli (February 19, 1919 – March 30, 2020) was an American engineer and public servant. He was the 3rd United States Assistant Secretary of the Army (Civil Works) from 1981 to 1984, serving during the Ronald Reagan administration.

== Early life ==
Gianelli was born in Stockton, California in February 1919. He was educated at the University of California, Berkeley, receiving a B.S. in 1941. He then served in the United States Army Corps of Engineers from 1941 to 1945, in the midst of World War II. In this capacity, he was involved in building airfields, water supply facilities, and other construction projects at installations in Hawaii, Saipan, Okinawa, and Korea. By the end of the war, he had attained the rank of Major.

== Early career ==
After the war, in January 1946, Gianelli took a job in the office of the State Engineer of California. After ten years in that job, he left for the California Department of Water Resources, becoming staff engineer and special assistant to the director. In 1959, he became district engineer for the CDWR's southern district.

In 1960, Gianelli left government service and formed a consulting engineering firm, Gianelli & Murray.

== Government career ==
In January 1967, Governor of California Ronald Reagan appointed Gianelli as head of the California Department of Water Resources. In that capacity, he oversaw the development of the California State Water Project.

Gianelli again left government service in 1973, becoming a consulting engineer. From 1973 to 1976, he served on the National Commission on Water Quality appointed by President of the United States Richard Nixon and chaired by Nelson Rockefeller.

In 1981, President Ronald Reagan nominated Gianelli as Assistant Secretary of the Army (Civil Works), and, after Senate Confirmation, he held this office from April 1981 until May 1984. He was chairman of the Panama Canal Commission, the last four years under special Congressional Authorization.

== Later life ==
Gianelli continued to work as a consultant after leaving government service in 1984. In 1997, he joined Dawson & Associates as an advisor on environmental permitting. He served there for more than a decade.

Gianelli was president of the Water Education Foundation, based in Sacramento, Calif., from 1985-1989. He made a major financial donation that helped the Foundation create an educational program for young professionals, which is named the William R. "Bill" Gianelli Water Leaders Class.

Government offices
Preceded by Michael Blumenfeld	Assistant Secretary of the Army (Civil Works); April 1981 – May 1984	Succeeded by Robert K. Dawson
