= Ron Hamm =

American politician (1951–2019)

5th Virginia Secretary of Natural Resources
- In office October 22, 2001 – January 12, 2002
- Governor: Jim Gilmore
- Preceded by: John Paul Woodley Jr.
- Succeeded by: W. Tayloe Murphy Jr.

Personal details
- Born: Ronald Parks Hamm; February 16, 1951
- Died: September 4, 2019 (aged 68)
- Party: Republican
- Spouse: Cheryl Wakefield
- Education: College of William & Mary; Virginia Commonwealth University

Ronald Parks Hamm (February 16, 1951 – September 4, 2019) was an American political operative who served as Virginia Secretary of Natural Resources under Governor Jim Gilmore. He previously served as Gilmore's Deputy Secretary of Natural Resources and as an aide to Virginia Congressmen Tom Davis and Tom Bliley.

Political offices
Preceded by John Paul Woodley Jr.	Virginia Secretary of Natural Resources; 2001–2002	Succeeded by W. Tayloe Murphy Jr.
