= Federal Marriage Amendment =

Proposed U.S. constitutional amendment

The Federal Marriage Amendment (FMA), also referred to by proponents as the Marriage Protection Amendment, was a proposed amendment to the United States Constitution that would have legally defined marriage as a union of one man and one woman. The FMA would also have prevented judicial extension of marriage rights to same-sex couples.

An amendment to the U.S. Constitution requires the support of two thirds of each house of Congress and ratification by three fourths of the states. The last congressional vote on the proposed amendment occurred in the House of Representatives on July 18, 2006, when the motion failed 236 to 187, falling short of the 290 votes required for passage in that body. The Senate has only voted on cloture motions with regard to the proposed amendment, the last of which was on June 7, 2006, when the motion failed 49 to 48, falling short of the 60 votes required to allow the Senate to proceed to consideration of the proposal and the 67 votes required to send the proposed amendment to the states for ratification. President George W. Bush endorsed this proposal and made it part of his campaign during the 2004 and 2006 election cycles.

== Background and current law ==
=== Role of states ===
In the United States, civil marriage is governed by state law. Each state is free to set the conditions for a valid marriage, subject to limits set by the state's own constitution and the U.S. Constitution. Traditionally, a marriage was considered valid if the requirements of the marriage law of the state where the marriage took place were fulfilled. (First Restatement of Conflicts on Marriage and Legitimacy s.121 (1934)). However, a state can refuse to recognize a marriage if the marriage violates a strong public policy of the state, even if the marriage was legal in the state where it was performed. (Restatement (Second) of Conflict of Laws § 283(2) (1971).) States historically exercised this "public policy exception" by refusing to recognize out-of-state polygamous marriages, underage marriages, incestuous marriages, and interracial marriages. Following the Windsor decision in 2013, nearly all courts that have addressed the issue have held that states with laws defining marriage as a one-man, one-woman union cannot refuse to recognize same-sex marriages that were legally performed elsewhere and must permit all people, regardless of gender or sexual orientation, the right to marry.

Same-sex marriage is currently legal in all US States. In 2003 and 2008 respectively, the Massachusetts and California supreme courts ruled in Goodridge v. Department of Public Health and In Re Marriage Cases that the states' constitutions required the state to permit same-sex marriage. The Massachusetts decision could be reversed by an amendment to the state constitution; to date, no such amendment has successfully been passed in Massachusetts. On June 2, the California Marriage Protection Act, commonly referred to as Prop 8 qualified for the 2008 General Election ballot. Voted into law on November 4, 2008, it amended the California Constitution to provide that "Only marriage between a man and a woman is valid or recognized in California". Prop 8 was later found to be unconstitutional and same-sex marriage was allowed to resume. Thirty states passed state constitutional amendments defining marriage as being between one man and one woman. On June 26, 2015, all amendments banning same-sex marriage were invalidated by the Supreme Court's ruling on Obergefell v. Hodges.

=== Federal statutes regulating marriage ===
Although individual U.S. states have the primary regulatory power with regard to marriage, the United States Congress has occasionally regulated marriage. The 1862 Morrill Anti-Bigamy Act, which made bigamy a punishable federal offense in U.S. territories, was followed by a series of federal laws designed to end the practice of polygamy. In 1996 as a reaction to a state level judicial ruling prohibiting same-sex couples from marrying that may violate Hawaii's constitutional equal protection clause (Baehr v. Miike, 80 Hawai`i 341), Congress passed the Defense of Marriage Act (DOMA), section 3 of which defined marriage as a legal union of one man and one woman for the purpose of interpreting federal law. Under DOMA section 3, the federal government did not recognize same-sex marriages, even if those unions were recognized by state law. For example, members of a same-sex couple legally married in Massachusetts could not file joint federal income tax returns even if they filed joint state income tax returns. DOMA section 3 was struck down by the U.S. Supreme Court in United States v. Windsor on June 26, 2013 and repealed by the Respect for Marriage Act on December 13, 2022.

=== The United States Constitution and federal courts ===
Federal courts have interpreted the U.S. Constitution to place some limits on states' ability to restrict access to marriage. In Loving v. Virginia, the United States Supreme Court overturned state marriage laws that barred interracial marriages on the basis that marriage is a "basic civil right..." and that "...the freedom to marry, or not marry, a person of another race resides with the individual and cannot be infringed by the State." The Supreme Court struck down a 1992 Colorado constitutional amendment that barred legislative and judicial remedies to protect homosexuals from discrimination solely on the basis of their sexual orientation in Romer v. Evans.

In 1972, the U.S. Supreme Court dismissed, "for want of a substantial question," an appeal by two men who unsuccessfully challenged Minnesota's marriage statutes in state court. Because the case, Baker v. Nelson, came to the Court through mandatory appellate review (not certiorari), the summary dismissal established Baker v. Nelson as a binding precedent.

In 2010, the United States District Court for the Northern District of California ruled that Proposition 8, passed two years earlier by a majority of voters, was unconstitutional. As in Judge Baitaillon's decision about the Nebraska law, Judge Vaughn Walker stated in his ruling that moral opposition to same-sex marriage is not sufficient reason to make a law valid. Judge Walker ruled the law violated the 14th Amendment's Equal Protection clause, as well as the Due Process Clause. The proponents of Proposition 8 appealed to the United States Court of Appeals for the Ninth Circuit, which affirmed the lower court's decision on February 7, 2012. On June 26, 2013, the U.S. Supreme Court, vacated the Ninth Circuit's ruling for lack of jurisdiction. Two days later the Ninth Circuit dissolved its stay of the district court's ruling, allowing same-sex marriage to resume in California. In 2015 the Supreme Court held in Obergefell v. Hodges that the government could not refuse to recognize same-sex marriage.

== Legislative history ==
The Federal Marriage Amendment has been introduced in the United States Congress multiple different times: in 2002, 2003, 2004, 2005, 2006, 2008, 2013, and 2015; none of which were successful.

=== 2002 ===
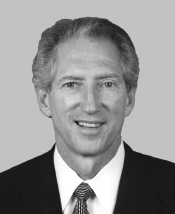
Ronnie Shows, sponsor of the first Federal Marriage Amendment

The original proposed Federal Marriage Amendment was written by the Alliance for Marriage under Matthew Daniels with the assistance of former Solicitor General and failed Supreme Court nominee Judge Robert Bork, Professor Robert P. George of Princeton University, and Professor Gerard V. Bradley of Notre Dame Law School. It was introduced in the 107th United States Congress in the House of Representatives on May 15, 2002, by Representative Ronnie Shows (D-Miss.) with 22 cosponsors, and read:

Marriage in the United States shall consist only of the union of a man and a woman. Neither this Constitution or the constitution of any State, nor state or federal law, shall be construed to require that marital status or the legal incidents thereof be conferred upon unmarried couples or groups.

The bill was designated H.J.Res 93 and was immediately referred to the House Committee on the Judiciary. On July 18, 2002, it was referred to the Subcommittee on the Constitution, which took no action on it.

=== 2003 ===
The amendment was introduced again by Rep. Marilyn Musgrave (R-Colo.) on May 21, 2003, with the same wording proposed in 2002. The bill was designated H.J.Res.56 in the House and was immediately referred to the House Committee on the Judiciary. On June 25, 2003, it was referred to the Subcommittee on the Constitution, where hearings were held on May 13, 2004. On November 23, Rep. Barney Frank (D-Mass.) objected that the amendment would interrupt Massachusetts' scheduled experiment with same-sex marriage, then scheduled to begin in May 2004. Musgrave countered that the Massachusetts marriages were court-ordered. She said: "If we're going to redefine marriage, let's let the American people, through their elected representatives, decide—not activist judges. Let the people of Massachusetts decide."

The bill was introduced in the Senate by Senator Wayne Allard (R-Colo.) on November 25, 2003, and designated S.J.Res.26. The amendment changed the language of the proposed amendment, substituting "marriage" for "marital status" and specifying that it applied to "any union other than the union of a man and a woman" rather than "unmarried couples or groups". The changes were intended to make it clear that state legislatures could still recognize civil unions if the amendment were to pass. "This new language makes the intent of the legislation even clearer: to protect marriage in this country as the union between a man and a woman, and to reinforce the authority of state legislatures to determine benefits issues related to civil unions or domestic partnerships," said Sen. Wayne Allard. It was immediately referred to the Senate Committee on the Judiciary.

=== 2004 ===
When the 2003 version of the FMA failed to advance in the Congress, Senator Allard re-introduced the Amendment on May 22, 2004, with a revised second sentence. Rep. Musgrave re-introduced the Amendment in the House on September 23, 2004, with the same revision.

The 2004 version of the Federal Marriage Amendment stated:

Marriage in the United States shall consist solely of the union of a man and a woman. Neither this Constitution nor the constitution of any State shall be construed to require that marriage or the legal incidents thereof be conferred upon any union other than the union of a man and a woman.

The bill was designated S.J.Res.30 in the Senate and was immediately referred to the Senate Committee on the Judiciary. When the bill became stuck in committee, Senator Allard re-introduced the Amendment in the Senate on July 7, 2004, where it was designated S.J.Res.40. The bill was subject to a filibuster: on July 9, 12, 13 and 14, the motion was made to proceed to consideration of the measure. On July 14, 2004, a cloture motion to force a direct vote on the FMA was defeated in the Senate by a margin of 50 nay votes to 48 yea votes. The 48 votes in support of the cloture motion were 12 votes short of the 60-vote supermajority (three-fifths) needed to end debate and force a vote on the Amendment itself. Senators John Kerry of Massachusetts and John Edwards of North Carolina skipped the filibuster vote. On July 15, 2004, the motion to proceed to consideration of the Amendment was withdrawn in the Senate. Six Republicans voted with a majority of Democrats against cloture in the Senate.

The bill was designated H.J.Res.106 in the House and was immediately referred to the House Committee on the Judiciary. On September 28, 2004, rules were recommended by the House Rules Committee with regards to debate and voting on the proposed Amendment. The rules were passed on September 30. The resolution was immediately considered. Passage of the proposed Amendment failed 227 yea votes to 186 nay votes, where 290 yea votes (two-thirds) are required for passage of a proposed Constitutional amendment.

=== 2005/2006 ===
On January 24, 2005, Senator Allard introduced the Marriage Protection Amendment, which was the 2004 version of the Federal Marriage Amendment verbatim, with 21 Republican co-sponsors. In 2006, Rep. Musgrave introduced the Marriage Protection Amendment in the House. This version had the same language as the 2004 proposal, except that the word "solely" in the first sentence was replaced by the word "only".

The bill was designated Senate Joint Resolution 1 in the Senate and was immediately referred to the Senate Committee on the Judiciary. On November 9, 2005, the Subcommittee on Constitution, Civil Rights and Property Rights approved the bill for consideration by the full Judiciary Committee. On May 18, 2006, the Judiciary Committee reported to the Senate and the bill was placed on the legislative calendar. The motion to proceed to the measure was first made on June 5, 2006. A cloture motion on the motion to proceed was then presented in Senate. On June 6 and 7, the motion to proceed to the measure was again considered in the Senate. On June 7, a cloture motion to force a direct vote on the Marriage Protection Amendment was defeated in the Senate by a margin of 48 no votes to 49 aye votes, with the vote mostly following party lines with Democrats opposing and Republicans in favor. The 49 votes in support of the cloture motion were 11 votes short of the 60-vote supermajority (three-fifths) needed to end debate and force a vote on the amendment itself. Eight Republicans opposed or did not vote; four Democrats favored or did not vote. The only senators who changed their position from the 2004 vote to the 2006 vote were Senators Judd Gregg (R-N.H.) and Arlen Specter (R-Penn.), both of whom voted aye in 2004 and no in 2006.

The bill was designated House Joint Resolution 88 in the House and was immediately referred to the House Committee on the Judiciary. On July 17, 2006, rules were recommended by the House Rules Committee with regards to debate and voting on the proposed Amendment. The rules were passed on July 18. The resolution was immediately considered. Passage of the proposed amendment failed 236 yea votes to 187 nay votes, where 290 yea votes (two-thirds) are required for passage. The motion to reconsider was immediately laid on the table and agreed to without objection. Twenty-seven Republican representatives opposed the FMA; thirty-four Democrats voted in favor of the FMA and one independent voted against the FMA in the vote on July 18, 2006, in the House.

=== 2008 ===
On May 22, 2008, Rep. Paul Broun (R-Ga.) and 91 co-sponsors introduced H.J.Res.89, which proposed the enactment of FMA. Senator Roger Wicker (R-Miss.) and eight other senators introduced similar legislation with S.J.Res.43 on June 25.

=== 2013 ===
U.S. Representative Tim Huelskamp (R-Kansas) reintroduced the FMA (H.J.Res. 51) on June 28, 2013, in response to the U.S. Supreme Court decision striking down the Defense of Marriage Act in United States v. Windsor. The bill, which had 58 cosponsors, never made it out of committee.

=== 2015 ===
Huelskamp again introduced the Federal Marriage Amendment in 2015, during the 114th Congress, as H.J.Res. 32. The amendment garnered 37 cosponsors, all Republicans. It never made it out of committee.

== Political considerations ==
=== Bush administration's stance ===
In 2003, the White House declined to take a stand on the amendment, although Press Secretary Ari Fleischer relayed that President George W. Bush believed that marriage was between a man and a woman. In his State of the Union address on January 20, 2004, President Bush alluded to the recent court decision in Massachusetts ordering the state to recognize same-sex marriages beginning in May: "Activist judges ... have begun redefining marriage by court order, without regard for the will of the people and their elected representatives.... If judges insist on forcing their arbitrary will upon the people, the only alternative left to the people would be the constitutional process." On February 24, after the same Massachusetts court reiterated that it was insisting on marriage and that civil unions were insufficient, Bush expressed support for this amendment for the first time. In August, Vice President Dick Cheney neither endorsed nor condemned the FMA, arguing that same-sex marriage is an issue for the states to decide. In 2009, Cheney stated his support for same-sex marriage on a state-by-state basis.

On January 25, 2005, according to The New York Times, Bush told a privately invited group of African-American community and religious leaders that he remained committed to amending the Constitution to "ban same-sex marriage". Over the course of the next two days, it was revealed by The Washington Post and USA Today that the Bush administration had paid columnists to promote its views. The Department of Health and Human Services paid Maggie Gallagher $21,500, and Mike McManus $49,000, to write syndicated news columns endorsing the FMA. Additionally, Gallagher also received $20,000 in 2002 and 2003 to write a report on government initiatives to strengthen marriage. McManus leads a group called "Marriage Savers" promoting marriage as defined between a man and a woman.

=== Influence on 2004 presidential election ===
By the time Americans went to the polls, John Kerry opposed the Federal Marriage Amendment and affirmatively supported civil unions, while George W. Bush supported the Federal Marriage Amendment but was not opposed to states enacting their own civil union legislation.

Previously, on February 24, 2004, Bush called for an amendment which would have outlawed same-sex marriage, and which would have disallowed states from recognizing or enforcing same-sex civil unions. Bush's statement included a requirement that any amendment "leav[e] the state legislatures free to make their own choices in defining legal arrangements other than marriage." The White House partly clarified Bush's position in a February 24, 2004 press conference with White House Press Secretary Scott McClellan, who stated that by calling on the FMA to permit states the possibility of creating other "legal arrangements," Bush specifically meant to permit states the chance of enacting civil unions. (McClellan also stated, however, that Bush did not personally support civil unions.) Similarly, at the February 25, 2004 press conference, McClellan stated that the White House intended to work with Congress to develop language for the FMA that permitted states to enact civil unions. Although Bush frequently spoke about FMA on the campaign from February and November 2004, he avoided mention of the phrase "civil unions" until an ABC News interview of October 26, 2004, aired one week before the election.

The FMA's Republican co-sponsors, Senator Wayne Allard (R-CO) and Representative Marilyn Musgrave (R-CO), announced new language for the proposed amendment on March 23, 2004, replacing the second sentence of the amendment with "Neither this Constitution, nor the constitution of any State, shall be construed to require that marriage or the legal incidents thereof be conferred upon any union other than the union of a man and a woman." Both Allard and Musgrave called the change purely "technical."

Opponents of the FMA claim polling of the public has shown a cautious response, with a number of polls indicating opposition, even in states such as Arizona and Colorado which were thought of as socially conservative at the time. They cite Pew Research Center exit polls from the 2004 elections finding that 25% of polled voters support same-sex marriage and another 35% support civil unions.

On the other hand, of the 11 states in which amendments defining marriage were on the ballot, all passed handily. Bush won in nine, including Ohio. Interpretation of some exit polling suggests that the amendments may have brought out one million additional voters, most of which came out for the first time to cast their ballots for Bush. Notably, a vast majority of these states have not voted for a Democrat in years. The two states that Bush did not win, Michigan and Oregon, still passed amendments limiting official recognition of marriage to one man one woman unions.

However, Roberta Combs, President of the Christian Coalition of America claims, "Christian evangelicals made the major difference once again this year." In the 2000 presidential election, there was some speculation that a number of evangelicals did not go to the polls and vote because of the October surprise of George W. Bush's drunk-driving arrest record. In a dozen swing states that decided the presidential election, moral values tied with the economy and jobs as the top issue in the campaign, according to Associated Press exit polls.

== Arguments against ==
This section contains arguments specific to the Federal Marriage Amendment. For arguments for and against same-sex marriage in general, see Same-sex marriage#Issues

The first sentence of H.J. Res. 56 would provide an official definition of legal marriage in the United States. Proponents claim that this is a reasonable measure, based on established custom, which defends the family and the institution of marriage. To others, it is an unfair means of excluding same-sex couples from receiving benefits from that institution. Those individuals believe the Federal Marriage Amendment discriminates against the LGBT (Lesbian, Gay, Bisexual, Transgender) community.

=== Federalism ===
Opponents of the FMA argued it would violate the states' rights to regulate marriage by federalizing the issue, which they said should be left to the states. Some used the federalism argument, including Senator John Kerry, Senator John McCain, and Representative Ron Paul, who opposed the FMA for several reasons, one of which that regulating marriage is not a proper role of the federal government. The author Jonathan Rauch wrote that "the proposed amendment strips power not from judges but from states," since the amendment would not allow any state to create same-sex marriage even by the rules of its own state-level democracy. "That conservatives would contemplate so striking a repudiation of federalism," Rauch wrote, "is a sign of the panic that same-sex marriage inspires on the right." Furthermore, constitutionally defining marriage would have reversed the choices already made in states and territories including Massachusetts, Vermont, Connecticut, New Hampshire, New York, Iowa, and the District of Columbia.

=== Unmarried heterosexual couples ===
It is argued that the 2003 version of the FMA would have severely affected the ability of heterosexual unmarried couples to seek some degree of legal protection and/or provisions.

Opponents of the FMA argue that it may complicate efforts to enforce laws against domestic abuse in heterosexual relationships involving unmarried couples. They note that two Ohio courts ruled that Ohio's similar amendment made the state's domestic violence laws unconstitutional as applied to unmarried couples, because they created a "quasi-marital relationship". (The decisions were later reversed.)

Supporters of the FMA asserted that this argument was a scare tactic and that the FMA would not prevent laws against domestic abuse from being applied to unmarried couples. In Ohio, 8 of the 10 Ohio Courts that addressed the effect of the State Amendment on Domestic Violence Laws found no conflict. Additionally several Attorneys General of other states issued legal opinions finding that no such conflict would exist. With the final ruling of the Supreme Court of Ohio, which held that the DV Statute was not in-conflict, no State faces any contention between marriage Statutes and Domestic Violence Laws.

=== Separation of church and state ===
Some religious groups argue that having the government decide whether a same-sex marriage should be legally binding on the grounds of the ideology of other religious groups restricts their religious freedom. They argue that marriage is a religious term that should not be defined by the government. Where same-sex marriage is recognized in the United States, no church or other religious institution is forced to perform same-sex marriages, but the FMA would deny the opportunity for religions which approve of same-sex marriage to perform legally binding same-sex marriages.

=== Unnecessary and ineffective ===
Opponents of the FMA have claimed that life for those in a heterosexual marriage are not materially affected by a constitutional marriage definition or legalization of same-sex marriage. They stated that the FMA was totally unnecessary because federal and state laws, combined with the state of the relevant constitutional doctrines at the time, already made court-ordered nationwide same-sex marriage unlikely for the foreseeable future. It was claimed therefore, that such an amendment was a solution in search of a problem. It was claimed that neither federal nor state courts were likely to order same-sex marriage under the traditional interpretation of the Constitution's Full Faith and Credit Clause. Nor, for the foreseeable future, it was claimed, were courts likely to mandate same-sex marriage under substantive federal constitutional doctrines, such as the Fourteenth Amendment's Due Process Clause or the Equal Protection Clause. This claim ultimately became untrue, as the Supreme Court of the United States ruled that denying the right of marriage to same-sex couples was unconstitutional under the Equal Protection Clause in its landmark 2015 ruling in Obergefell v. Hodges.

=== Institution of Marriage Amendment ===
The Concerned Women for America (CWA), an anti-feminist group, were concerned about the wording of the 2004 Federal Marriage Amendment. CWA criticized the language in the amendment because the second sentence is open to differing interpretations, and its drafters acknowledged that it was specifically worded so state legislators could create civil unions and domestic partnerships, because the CWA opposes any legal recognition of same-sex couples. CWA preferred the Institution of Marriage Amendment crafted by Home School Legal Defense Association president Michael Farris. That amendment, which has not been introduced by any member of Congress, states:

Marriage in the United States shall consist only of the union of a man and a woman. Neither the United States nor any State shall recognize or grant to any unmarried person the legal rights or status of a spouse.

== Arguments in favor ==
This section contains arguments specific to the Federal Marriage Amendment. For arguments for and against same-sex marriage in general, see Same-sex marriage#Issues

=== Restriction of perceived judicial overreach ===
Proponents of FMA argued that same-sex marriage advocates wanted to disregard federalism and use the judicial system to make same-sex marriage legal nationwide, and that only the Federal Marriage Amendment could forestall that.

Proponents of the FMA initially argued that if it were not for judicial overreach, there would be no need for an FMA; states' rights would not be violated since no state legislatures had recognized same-sex marriage. However, by the end of 2012, a number of states had enacted same-sex marriage both through the actions of their state legislatures (Vermont, New Hampshire, New York), and through popular vote (Maine, Maryland, Minnesota, Washington).

Prior to these legislative enactments and popular vote outcomes, proponents of the FMA argues that the federalism proposed by the opponents of a constitutional amendment was a contrivance for permitting federal courts to force same-sex marriage upon the whole nation, no matter what the people of the individual states desire. Proponents supported this claim with Citizens for Equal Protection v. Bruning, in which a district court struck down Nebraska's marriage amendment, even though it had been passed by a margin of seventy percent (although the amendment was later reinstated). Opponents of the FMA argued that no federal court has ever ordered a state to permit same-sex marriage. However, on February 7, 2012, a federal appeals court in a 2-to-1 decision threw out California's voter-approved restriction on same-sex marriage (Proposition 8) saying that it violated the Equal Protection clause of the U.S. Constitution.

=== Uniform application of Full Faith and Credit ===
Under the Full Faith and Credit Clause, with certain exceptions, a state is obligated to honor the judgments and declarations of other states. While some assert that a "license" could be construed as a "judgment", the majority of legal scholars disagree. However, it is pointed out that a judgment for divorce is required to be honored because judgments are required to be enforced by out-of-state jurisdictions, regardless of whether those judgments are against the public policy of the out state forum (see Williams v. North Carolina, 317 U.S. 287 (1942) (the case also stated that there is no "authority which lends support to the view that the full faith and credit clause compels the courts of one state to subordinate the local policy of that state, as respects its domiciliaries, to the statutes of any other state")). Because of the intricacies of family law and the mobility of married couples, the recognition of marriages in other states varies. The need for clarification on state uniformity in this issue requires a constitutional amendment at the federal level, particularly considering there will be a flood of marriages in out-of-state jurisdictions for purposes of obtaining a same-sex marriage license.

=== Opposite-sex marriage as necessary for child-rearing ===
FMA proponents argued that opposite-sex marriage has been given special legal protections, as the basis for child-rearing, and to legitimize lines of inheritance.

== Legislative activity ==
=== Federal level ===
Congress	Short title	Bill number(s)	Summary	Date introduced	Sponsor(s)	# of cosponsors	Latest status
107th Congress	Federal Marriage amendment	H.J.Res. 93	Constitutional Amendment - Declares that marriage in the United States shall consist only of the union of a man and a woman. States that neither this Constitution or the constitution of any State, nor State or federal law, shall be construed to require that marital status or the legal incidents thereof be conferred upon unmarried couples or groups.	May 15, 2002	Ronnie Shows (D-MS)	22	Died in the Committee on the Judiciary
108th Congress	Federal Marriage Amendment	H.J.Res. 56	Constitutional Amendment - Declares that marriage in the United States shall consist only of the union of a man and a woman. Prohibits the Constitution or any State constitution, or State or Federal law from being construed to require that marital status or its legal incidents be conferred upon unmarried couples or groups.	May 21, 2003	Marilyn Musgrave (R-CO)	131	Died in the Committee on the Judiciary
108th Congress	Federal Marriage Amendment	S.J.Res. 43	Constitutional Amendment - Declares that marriage in the United States shall consist only of the union of a man and a woman. Prohibits the Constitution or any State constitution, or State or Federal law, from being construed to require that marital status or its legal incidents be conferred upon unmarried couples or groups.	November 25, 2003	Wayne Allard (R-CO)	10	Died in the Committee on the Judiciary
108th Congress	Federal Marriage Amendment	S.J.Res. 40	Constitutional Amendment - Federal Marriage Amendment - Declares that marriage in the United States shall consist only of the union of a man and a woman. Prohibits the Constitution or any State constitution from being construed to require that marital status or its legal incidents be conferred upon any union other than that of a man and a woman.	July 7, 2004	Wayne Allard (R-CO)	19	Failed cloture motion (48-50)
108th Congress	Proposing an amendment to the Constitution of the United States relating to marriage.	H.J.Res. 106	Constitutional Amendment - Marriage Protection Amendment - Declares that marriage in the United States shall consist only of the union of a man and a woman. Prohibits the Constitution or any State constitution from being construed to require that marital status or its legal incidents be conferred upon any union other than that of a man and a woman.	September 23, 2004	Marilyn Musgrave (R-CO)	121	Failed in House (227-186)
109th Congress	Marriage Protection Amendment	S.J.Res. 1	Constitutional Amendment - Marriage Protection Amendment - Declares that: (1) marriage in the United States shall consist only of the union of a man and a woman; and (2) neither the U.S. Constitution nor the constitution of any state shall be construed to require that marriage or the legal incidents of marriage be conferred upon any other union.	January 24, 2005	Wayne Allard (R-CO)	32	Failed cloture motion (49-48)
109th Congress	Marriage Protection Amendment	H.J.Res. 88	Constitutional Amendment - Marriage Protection Amendment - Declares that: (1) marriage in the United States shall consist only of the union of a man and a woman; and (2) neither the U.S. Constitution nor the constitution of any state shall be construed to require that marriage or the legal incidents of marriage be conferred upon any other union.	June 6, 2006	Marilyn Musgrave (R-CO)	134	Failed in House (236-187)
110th Congress	Marriage Protection Amendment	H.J.Res. 89	Constitutional Amendment - Marriage Protection Amendment - Defines marriage in the United States as consisting only of the union of a man and a woman. Prohibits either the U.S. Constitution or the constitution of any state from being construed to require that marriage or the legal incidents of marriage be conferred upon any other union.	May 22, 2008	Paul Broun (R-GA)	91	Died in the Subcommittee on the Constitution and Civil Justice
110th Congress	Marriage Protection Amendment	S.J.Res. 43	Constitutional Amendment - Marriage Protection Amendment - Declares that: (1) marriage in the United States shall consist only of the union of a man and a woman; and (2) neither the U.S. Constitution nor the constitution of any state shall be construed to require that marriage or the legal incidents of marriage be conferred upon any other union.	June 25, 2008	Roger Wicker (R-MS)	17	Died in the Committee on the Judiciary
113th Congress	Proposing an amendment to the Constitution of the United States relating to marriage.	H.J.Res. 51	Constitutional Amendment - Marriage Protection Amendment - Defines marriage in the United States as consisting only of the union of a man and a woman. Prohibits either the U.S. Constitution or the constitution of any state from being construed to require that marriage or the legal incidents of marriage be conferred upon any other union.	June 28, 2013	Tim Huelskamp (R-KS)	58	Referred to the Subcommittee on the Constitution and Civil Justice
114th Congress	Proposing an amendment to the Constitution of the United States relating to marriage.	H.J.Res. 32		February 12, 2015	Tim Huelskamp (R-KS)	30	Died in Congress. Never made it out of the committee due to not enough votes on the proposal.

=== Article V convention initiated by state legislatures ===
On April 2, 2014, the Alabama House of Representatives adopted a joint resolution calling for an Article V convention to draft an amendment to the federal Constitution to define marriage as the union of only one man and only one woman in all jurisdictions of the United States.

== Public opinion ==
=== Nationwide polling ===
Polling on the subject has fluctuated widely, with opposition for such an amendment increasing steadily for more than a decade. Beginning in 2010 polls have found majority support for legal recognition of same-sex marriage. A Gallup poll conducted in May 2014 found that 55% of Americans support allowing marriage for same-sex couples, the largest percentage ever measured by the organization. The same poll found only 42% opposed, and 4% had no opinion on the issue.

A 2012 Fox News poll found that 38% of American voters support a constitutional amendment banning same-sex marriage, while 53% oppose. A 2012 United Technologies/National Journal Congressional Connection poll found that only 24% of Americans agreed that Congress should "pass a constitutional amendment to ban same-sex marriage in every state regardless of state law."

A 2011 AP-NCC poll found that 48% of Americans said they would favor such an amendment defining marriage as between a man and a woman, with about 40% strongly favoring such a change. However, 55% believe the issue should be handled at the state level.

A 2006 APR poll found that 33% of Americans favored amending the U.S. Constitution to ban same-sex marriage, while 49% felt each state should make its own laws on marriage, and 18% were unsure. In May 2006, a Gallup poll found that 50% of Americans would favor amending the federal Constitution to ban same-sex marriage, while 47% were opposed, and 3% were undecided or did not respond. An ABC News poll that year found that 42% of Americans supported amending the U.S. Constitution, banning same-sex marriage.

A 2003 Wirthlin poll found that 57% of Americans supported a constitutional amendment to define marriage as the union of a man and a woman.

=== State polling ===
Public opinion varies widely between different states. Only two states, Mississippi and Alabama, had public opinion generally more opposed to same sex marriage than in favor in 2017, with only Alabama having an absolute majority, 51%, opposed; in Mississippi, there was plurality opposition. In Louisiana, Tennessee, North Carolina, and West Virginia, there was plurality support; in all other states, there was absolute majority support. The lowest approval of same sex marriage was 41% in Alabama. The highest was 80% in Vermont and Massachusetts.
