= Nancy P. Dorn =

American government official (born 1958)

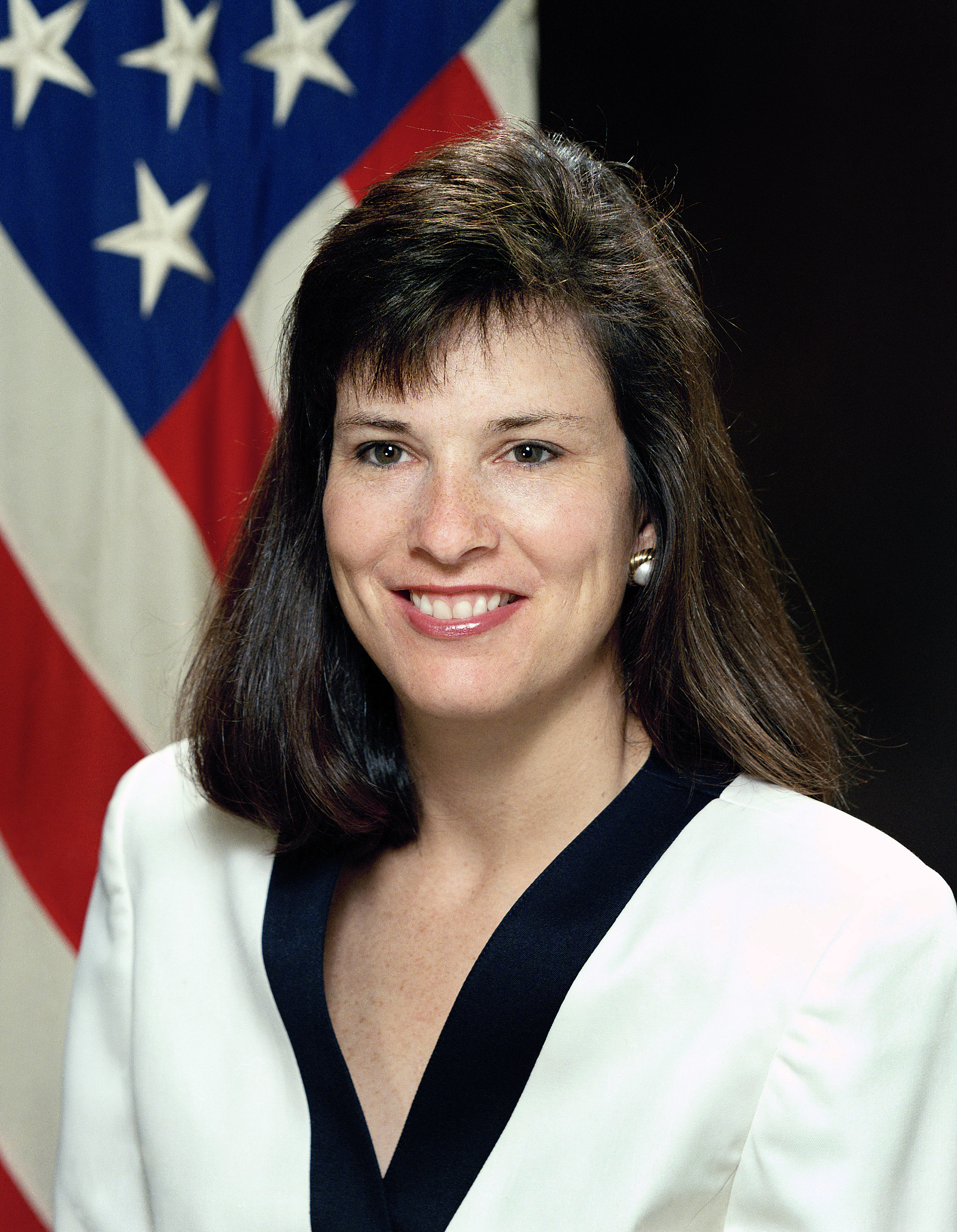

Assistant Secretary of the Army for Civil Works
- In office August 1991 – January 1993
- President: George H. W. Bush
- Preceded by: Robert W. Page
- Succeeded by: Martin Lancaster

Personal details
- Born: September 18, 1958 (age 67) Lubbock, Texas, U.S.

Nancy Patricia Dorn (born September 18, 1958) was the United States Assistant Secretary of the Army for Civil Works from 1991 to 1993. She later served as deputy director of the Office of Management and Budget from 2002 to 2003.

== Biography ==
Dorn was born in Lubbock, Texas. She attended Baylor University, graduating with a B.A. degree in 1981.

After college, Dorn got a job on the associate staff of the United States House Committee on Appropriations as a legislative assistant. From 1983 to 1986, she was the associate staff designee on the staff for Rep. Tom Loeffler (R-Tex. 21). Loeffler made Dorn his chief of staff in 1986, and she then went on to serve as Loeffler's chief campaign spokesperson during the 1986 Texas gubernatorial election, which Loeffler ultimately lost to Bill Clements.

Later in 1986, Dorn joined the United States Department of State as Deputy Assistant Secretary of State for Legislative Affairs. She moved to the White House in 1988, becoming Special Assistant to the President for Legislative Affairs. In 1990, she moved to the United States Department of Defense as Deputy Assistant Secretary of Defense for Inter-American Affairs.

On April 24, 1991, President of the United States George H. W. Bush announced his intention to nominate Dorn as Assistant Secretary of the Army (Civil Works); after Senate confirmation, she subsequently held this office from July 1991 until January 1993. During her time as Assistant Secretary, the United States Army Corps of Engineers took a wider role in environmental cleanup projects, including cleanup of nuclear production sites operated by the Department of Defense and the United States Department of Energy, and the United States Environmental Protection Agency's Superfund sites.

From 1992 to 1998, Dorn was a principal of the K Street lobbying firm of Hooper, Hooper, Owen & Gould (later known as Hooper, Owen & Winburn), with her lobbying focusing on energy, taxes, and international issues.

President of the United States Bill Clinton appointed Dorn to the board of the Inter-American Foundation in August 1997.

From 1999 to 2001, Dorn was national security adviser to House Speaker Dennis Hastert (R-Ill. 14). A minor controversy erupted in 2000, when it was reported that during her time at Hooper, Owen & Winburn, Dorn, and fellow lobbyist Charlie Wilson, had lobbied on behalf of Hutchison Whampoa at a time when Rep. Dana Rohrabacher (R-Cal. 46) had introduced a house resolution condemning Hutchison Whampoa for its ties to the Chinese Communist Party and the People's Liberation Army, and its alleged bribery of Panamanian officials to enable it to win port deals in the Panama Canal. Speaker Hastert had not been informed that Dorn had lobbied on behalf of Hutchison Whampoa, Azerbaijan, and Pakistan, which was embarrassing to Hastert when revealed.

In 2001, Dorn joined the office of Vice President of the United States Dick Cheney as a legislative affairs assistant. She became deputy director of the Office of Management and Budget the next year.

Dorn left government service in May 2003 to become Vice President of Corporate Government Relations of General Electric.

Government offices
Preceded by Robert W. Page	Assistant Secretary of the Army (Civil Works); August 1991 – January 1993	Succeeded by Martin Lancaster
