= Michael Parker (politician) =

American businessman and politician (born 1949)

Mike Parker
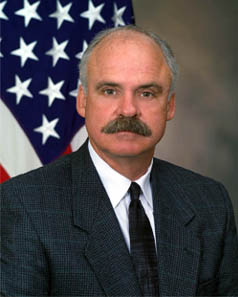

Assistant Secretary of the Army for Civil Works
- In office October 2001 – March 2002
- President: George W. Bush
- Preceded by: Joseph Westphal
- Succeeded by: John Woodley

Member of the U.S. House of Representatives from Mississippi's 4th district
- In office January 3, 1989 – January 3, 1999
- Preceded by: Wayne Dowdy
- Succeeded by: Ronnie Shows

Personal details
- Born: Paul Michael Parker; October 31, 1949 (age 76) Laurel, Mississippi, U.S.
- Party: Democratic (before 1995); Republican (1995–present)
- Education: William Carey University (BA)

Paul Michael Parker (born October 31, 1949) is an American businessman and politician from the U.S. state of Mississippi. From 1989 to 1999, he served five terms in Congress as a member of the Democratic Party and, later, the Republican Party.

In 1999, he was the Republican nominee for Governor of Mississippi. He was defeated in a tight election that was decided by the Mississippi House of Representatives. He later served as Assistant Secretary of the U.S. Army, with authority over the U.S. Army Corps of Engineers.

== Biography ==
Parker was born in Laurel, Mississippi and he graduated from William Carey College with a BA in English in 1970. Before entering politics, Parker owned and operated a funeral home business, insurance companies, land and timber companies, and a sand, clay and gravel business. Parker was elected to the House of Representatives as a Democrat in 1988 following a hard-fought primary with a wide field of contenders. The district included Jackson, Vicksburg, Natchez, McComb, and Brookhaven.

=== Party switch ===
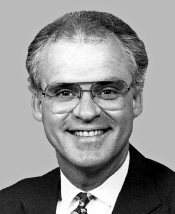
Parker during his tenure in Congress

As a Democratic congressman, Parker wore his party ties very loosely. His voting record was conservative even by Mississippi Democratic standards. During Parker's successful 1992 general election campaign, he did not endorse Democratic Presidential candidate Bill Clinton. After his re-election in November 1994, Parker voted 'Present' in the election for Speaker of the House in 1995 instead of voting for the House Democratic leader Richard Gephardt.

On November 10, 1995, Parker joined the Republican Party. Although his district was almost 40 percent African-American—one of the highest percentages for a Republican-held district—Parker was reelected with little difficulty in 1996. He did not run for re-election in 1998 in order to focus on his bid for Governor of Mississippi.

=== Campaign for governor ===
In the 1999 gubernatorial election Parker had almost 9,000 fewer votes than his Democratic opponent, Lieutenant Governor Ronnie Musgrove. However, due to the presence of two minor candidates, Musgrove came up a few thousand votes short of a majority. Under the state constitution, a gubernatorial candidate must win a majority of the popular vote and a majority of state house districts. Each candidate carried 61 of the 122 state house districts. The election was thus decided by the state house, where the Democrats had a supermajority at the time. However, Parker refused to concede, and the House elected Musgrove 86-36 along partisan lines.

=== Army Corps ===
Parker was appointed by George W. Bush as Assistant Secretary of the Army (Civil Works), with oversight of the Army Corps of Engineers, which has numerous projects in Parker's home state of Mississippi. Parker was one of the first political casualties of the Bush administration's heavily centralized management style when he spoke out to promote the Corps of Engineers priorities and was then asked to leave in the summer of 2002. In recent years Parker has been a Washington lobbyist, specializing in infrastructure issues.

=== Post-politics ===
In August 2020, Parker endorsed Democrat Joe Biden for President, along with 26 other former Republican members of Congress.

In 2023, Parker endorsed Democrat Brandon Presley for the 2023 Mississippi gubernatorial election. He appeared in a campaign commercial titled "Republicans" which featured various Republicans espousing their support for Presley.

== See also ==
- List of American politicians who switched parties in office
- List of United States representatives who switched parties

U.S. House of Representatives
Preceded by Wayne Dowdy	Member of the U.S. House of Representatives from Mississippi's 4th congressional district 1989–1999	Succeeded by Ronnie Shows
Party political offices
Preceded by Kirk Fordice	Republican nominee for Governor of Mississippi; 1999	Succeeded by Haley Barbour
Political offices
Preceded by Joseph Westphal	Assistant Secretary of the Army for Civil Works; 2001–2002	Succeeded by John Woodley
U.S. order of precedence (ceremonial)
Preceded by David R. Bowen as Former U.S. Representative	Order of precedence of the United States as Former U.S. Representative	Succeeded by Gregg Harper as Former U.S. Representative
