= Adam Telle =

American government official (born 1981/2)

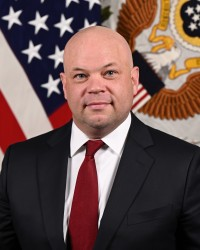
- Official portrait, 2025

Acting United States Secretary of the Army
- Incumbent
- Assumed office September 3, 2026
- President: Donald Trump
- Preceded by: Daniel P. Driscoll

United States Assistant Secretary of the Army for Civil Works
- Incumbent
- Assumed office August 5, 2025
- President: Donald Trump
- Preceded by: Michael L. Connor

Personal details
- Born: Adam R. Telle; 1981 or 1982 (age 44–45)
- Education: Mississippi State University

Adam R. Telle (born 1981 or 1982) is an American government official who has served as the acting United States secretary of the Army since September 2026 and as the 14th United States assistant secretary of the Army for civil works since August 2025.

== Early life and education ==
Adam R. Telle was born in 1981 or 1982. A native of Northport, Alabama, he attended Tuscaloosa County High School, where he was a National Merit Scholar. He later attended Mississippi State University, where he served as student body president and earned degrees in computer science and communication.

== Career ==
Telle began his career in the United States Senate, initially working for Alabama senator Richard Shelby. He later spent ten years on the staff of Mississippi senator Thad Cochran, where he served in several roles, including deputy chief of staff, legislative director, and senior national security staffer. His work for Cochran included matters related to Hurricane Katrina recovery, water resources legislation and appropriations, and the National Flood Insurance Program.

Telle later served as the senior staff member for the Senate Appropriations Subcommittee on Homeland Security. In that role, he worked under subcommittee chairs Cochran, Shelby, John Boozman, and Shelley Moore Capito.

During the first Trump administration, Telle served in the White House Office of Legislative Affairs, where he led the office's Senate team and served as Trump's chief liaison to the Senate. His work included national security and appropriations issues.

Telle returned to the Senate in 2021 to work for United States senator Bill Hagerty, initially serving as legislative director and chief advisor. In August 2021, Hagerty appointed him chief of staff.

== Assistant Secretary of the Army ==
President Donald Trump nominated Telle to serve as assistant secretary of the Army for civil works in 2025. The United States Senate confirmed his nomination on August 2, 2025, by a vote of 72–22. He was sworn in on August 5, becoming the 14th person to hold the position.

As assistant secretary, Telle has principal responsibility for establishing policy and supervising the United States Army Corps of Engineers Civil Works program. His portfolio includes commercial navigation, flood and storm damage reduction, water resources infrastructure, and permitting activities under the Clean Water Act.

== Acting Secretary of the Army ==
On September 3, 2026, Trump named Telle acting secretary of the Army, succeeding Daniel P. Driscoll. On October 1, 2026, he issued a memorandum instructing the creation of U.S. Army Futures and Autonomous Systems Command (FASCOM).

Political offices
Preceded by Michael L. Connor	United States Assistant Secretary of the Army for Civil Works; 2025–present	Incumbent
Preceded by Daniel P. Driscoll	United States Secretary of the Army; Acting; 2026–present	Incumbent
