= Jo-Ellen Darcy =

American government official

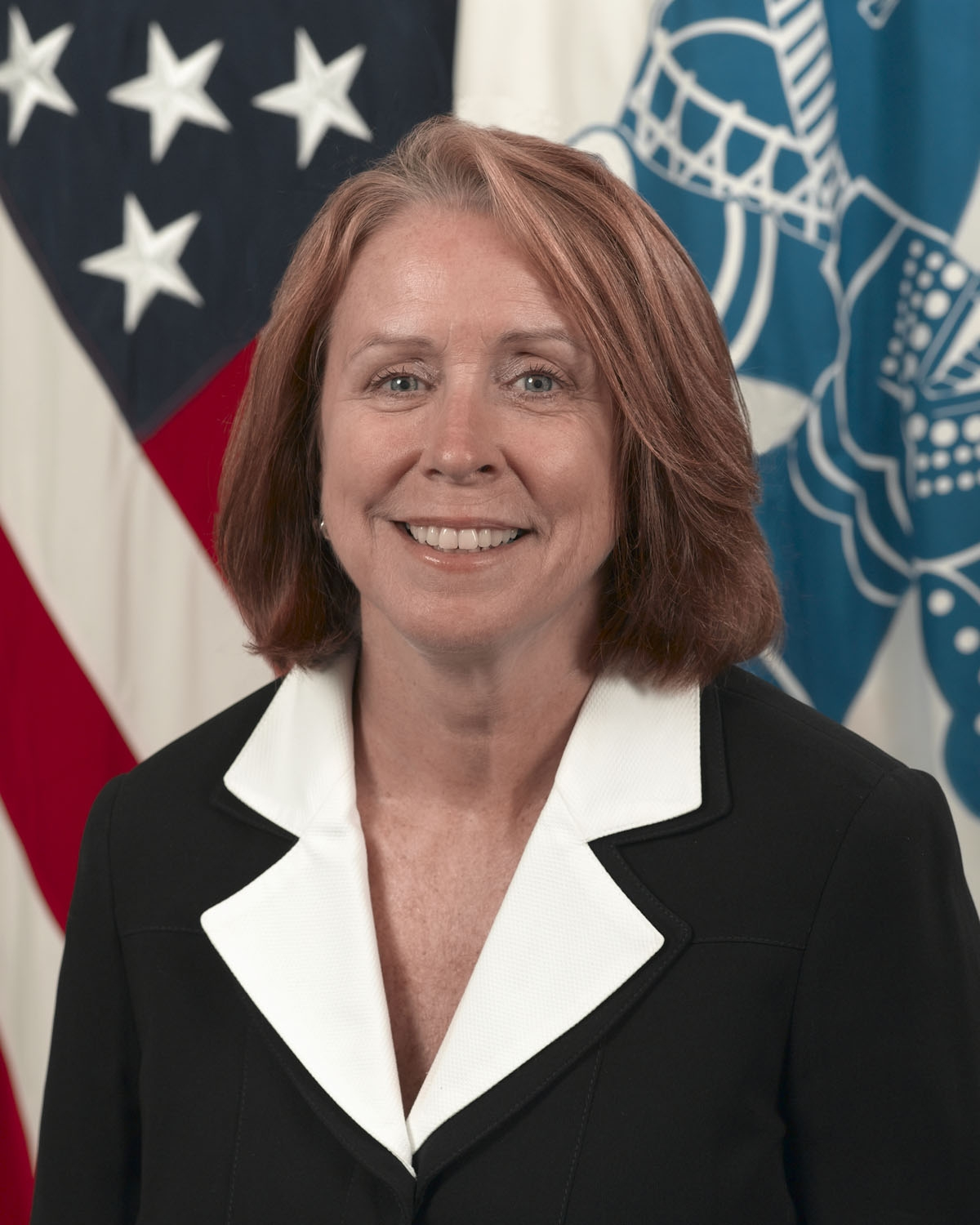

United States Assistant Secretary of the Army for Civil Works
- In office August 11, 2009 – January 20, 2017
- President: Barack Obama; Donald Trump
- Preceded by: John Paul Woodley Jr.
- Succeeded by: R. D. James

Personal details
- Born: Fitchburg, Massachusetts

Jo-Ellen Darcy is an American government official, most recently serving as the assistant secretary of the army (civil works) from August 11, 2009, to January 20, 2017.

== Biography ==
Jo-Ellen Darcy was raised in Fitchburg, Massachusetts. She attended Boston College, receiving a B.S. in Philosophy and Sociology in 1973.

Darcy initially worked as an elementary school teacher before working for the United States House Committee on Financial Services' Subcommittee on Economic Stabilization.

In the 1980s, she joined the office of Governor of Michigan James Blanchard, serving as assistant to the director of personnel for gubernatorial appointments. She worked on water resources and environmental issues while in the governor's office. In 1987, she received an M.S. in Resource Development from Michigan State University. She then served as executive director of the Michigan Great Lakes and Water Resources Planning Commission.

After Blanchard left office in 1991, she worked as a lobbyist for the Investment Company Institute.

In 1993, Darcy became a staff member of the United States Senate Committee on Environment and Public Works. During her seven years on the EPW Committee staff, she worked on the Safe Drinking Water Act, the Clean Water Act, the committee's oversight of the United States Army Corps of Engineers and the Federal Emergency Management Agency, and Everglades restoration.

With the start of the 107th United States Congress, Darcy became the Senior Environmental Advisor to the United States Senate Committee on Finance. She served in this capacity for nine years.

On April 3, 2009, President of the United States Barack Obama nominated Darcy as Assistant Secretary of the Army (Civil Works), and, after Senate Confirmation, she assumed office on August 11, 2009.

On December 4, 2016, during the Dakota Access Pipeline protests, Assistant Secretary Darcy announced that the Army would not grant an easement for the pipeline to be drilled under Lake Oahe near the Standing Rock Indian Reservation.

Government offices
Preceded by John Paul Woodley Jr.	Assistant Secretary of the Army (Civil Works); August 9, 2009 – January 20, 2017	Succeeded by R. D. James
