= 1999 Mississippi gubernatorial election =

- November 2, 1999; January 4, 2000 (contingent election)
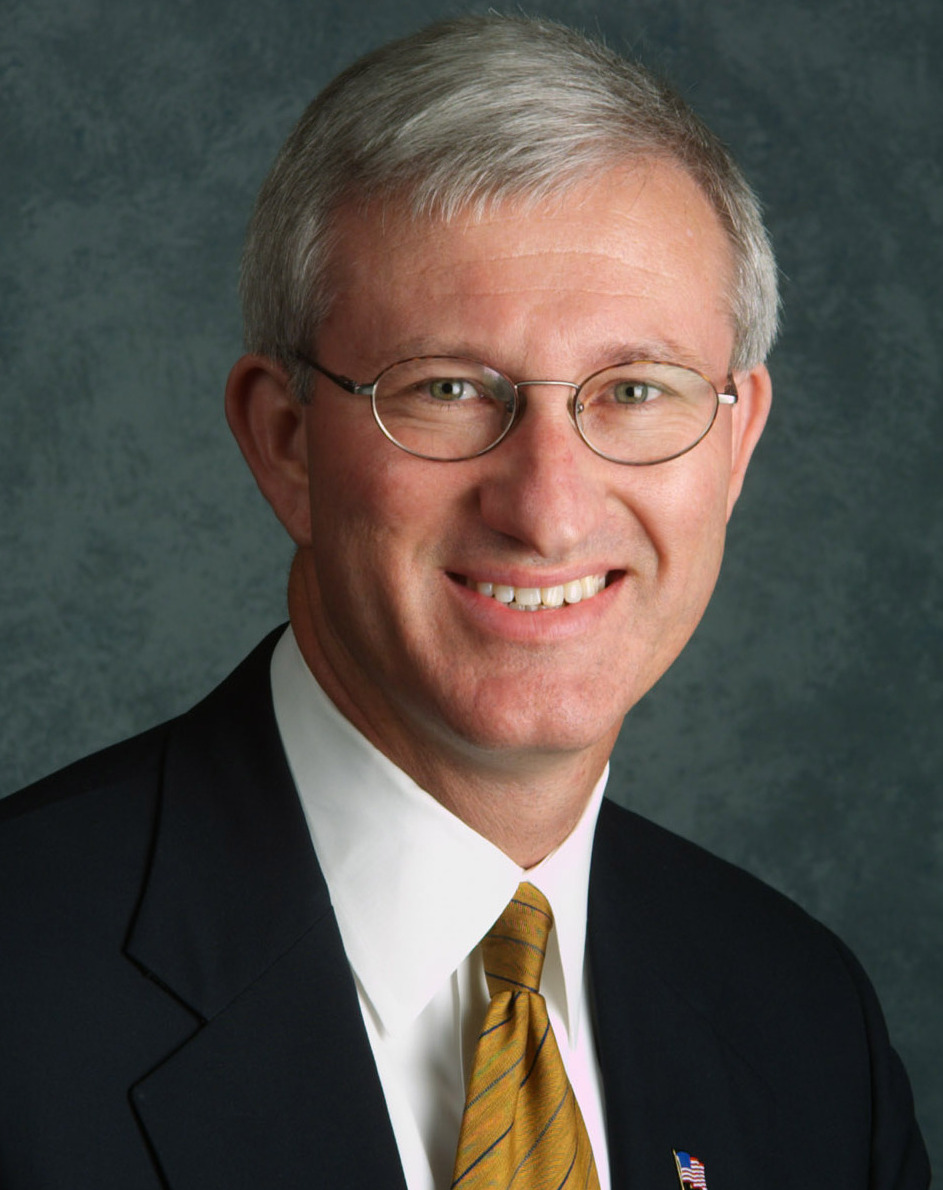

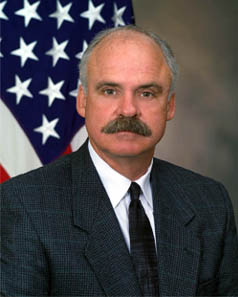
Nominee	Ronnie Musgrove	Michael Parker
Party	Democratic	Republican
Electoral vote	61	61
House vote	86	36
Popular vote	379,033	370,691
Percentage	49.62%	48.52%
- County results Musgrove: 40–50% 50–60% 60–70% 70–80% Parker: 40–50% 50–60% 60–70% 70–80%
Governor before election
Kirk Fordice
Republican
Elected Governor
Ronnie Musgrove
Democratic
via contingent election

The 1999 Mississippi gubernatorial election took place on November 2, 1999 to elect the governor of Mississippi. Republican incumbent Kirk Fordice was ineligible to run for reelection due to term limits. Because no candidate received a majority of the vote, the election was decided by the Mississippi House of Representatives, which elected Democratic lieutenant governor Ronnie Musgrove over U.S. representative Mike Parker.

In the general election, Democrat Lieutenant Governor Ronnie Musgrove won a plurality of the vote over Republican Congressman Mike Parker. Per the Mississippi Constitution, since no candidate had received a majority of the vote, the election was decided by the Mississippi House of Representatives in a contingent election. On January 4, 2000, the House voted 86–36, which was nearly along partisan lines, to elect Musgrove governor. As of 2026, this remains the last time a Democrat was elected Governor of Mississippi.

== Republican primary ==
=== Candidates ===
- George "Wagon Wheel" Blair
- Eddie Briggs, former lieutenant governor of Mississippi
- Dan Gibson
- Shawn O'Hara
- Mike Parker, former U.S. representative from Brookhaven
- Charlie Williams

=== Results ===
Mississippi Republican gubernatorial primary, 1999
Party	Candidate	Votes	%
Republican	Mike Parker	77,674	50.72
Republican	Eddie Briggs	42,763	27.92
Republican	Charlie Williams	17,176	11.22
Republican	Dan Gibson	11,348	7.41
Republican	George "Wagon Wheel" Blair	2,453	1.60
Republican	Shawn O'Hara	1,728	1.13
Total votes		153,142	100.00

== Democratic primary ==
=== Candidates ===
- Richard Barrett
- Charles Bell
- Carrie Harris
- James W. "Bootie" Hunt
- Ronnie Musgrove, lieutenant governor of Mississippi
- Katie Perrone
- Jim Roberts, former Mississippi public safety commissioner

=== Results ===
Mississippi Democratic gubernatorial primary, 1999
Party	Candidate	Votes	%
Democratic	Ronnie Musgrove	309,519	56.74
Democratic	Jim Roberts	142,617	26.14
Democratic	Richard Barrett	32,383	5.94
Democratic	Katie Perrone	16,476	3.02
Democratic	Charles Bell	13,159	2.41
Democratic	Carrie Harris	11,645	2.14
Democratic	James W. "Bootie" Hunt	11,572	2.12
Total votes		537,371	100.00

== General election ==
=== Candidates ===
- Jerry Ladner (Reform)
- Ronnie Musgrove, lieutenant governor of Mississippi (Democratic)
- Mike Parker, former U.S. representative from Brookhaven (Republican)
- Helen Perkins (Independent)

=== Polling ===
Poll source	Date(s)	Sample size	Margin of error	Mike Parker (R)	Ronnie Musgrove (D)	Other / undecided (Note: Calculated by taking the difference of 100% and all other candidates combined.)
Mason-Dixon Polling & Strategy	October 19, 1999	605	—	47%	42%	11%

=== Results ===
Under the 1890 Constitution of Mississippi, gubernatorial candidates must win a majority of the popular vote and a majority of state house districts to be elected.

With neither candidate winning the required popular and electoral majority, the Mississippi House of Representatives, where the Democrats had a supermajority at the time, decided between the two candidates with the most votes. Parker refused to concede, and the House elected Musgrove 86-36 along partisan lines.

Candidate	Party	Popular vote		Electoral vote		House vote	
Candidate	Party	Votes	%	Votes	%	Votes	%
Ronnie Musgrove	Democratic Party	379,033	49.62	61	50.00	86	70.49
Michael Parker	Republican Party	370,691	48.52	61	50.00	36	29.51
Jerry Ladner	Reform Party	8,208	1.07				
Helen Perkins	Independent	6,005	0.79				
Total		763,937	100.00	122	100.00	122	100.00

==== By county ====
County	Michael Parker Republican		Ronnie Musgrove Democratic		Various candidates Other parties		Margin		Total
County	#	%	#	%	#	%	#	%	Total
Adams	4,906	41.42%	6,815	57.53%	124	1.05%	1,909	16.12%	11,845
Alcorn	2,885	39.70%	4,198	57.77%	184	2.53%	1,313	18.07%	7,267
Amite	3,110	53.26%	2,593	44.41%	136	2.33%	-517	-8.85%	5,839
Attala	2,790	50.39%	2,680	48.40%	67	1.21%	-110	-1.99%	5,537
Benton	636	26.66%	1,653	69.28%	97	4.07%	1,017	42.62%	2,386
Bolivar	3,806	35.13%	6,765	62.44%	263	2.43%	2,959	27.31%	10,834
Calhoun	2,449	51.23%	2,249	47.05%	82	1.72%	-200	-4.18%	4,780
Carroll	2,734	54.95%	2,165	43.52%	76	1.53%	-569	-11.44%	4,975
Chickasaw	2,812	42.27%	3,397	51.07%	443	6.66%	585	8.79%	6,652
Choctaw	1,644	52.98%	1,393	44.89%	66	2.13%	-251	-8.09%	3,103
Claiborne	954	22.97%	3,114	74.96%	86	2.07%	2,160	52.00%	4,154
Clarke	3,457	53.35%	2,869	44.27%	154	2.38%	-588	-9.07%	6,480
Clay	2,247	39.16%	3,402	59.29%	89	1.55%	1,155	20.13%	5,738
Coahoma	1,822	29.83%	4,208	68.89%	78	1.28%	2,386	39.06%	6,108
Copiah	4,250	51.53%	3,910	47.41%	87	1.05%	-340	-4.12%	8,247
Covington	2,834	52.09%	2,504	46.02%	103	1.89%	-330	-6.07%	5,441
DeSoto	9,301	49.71%	9,144	48.87%	265	1.42%	-157	-0.84%	18,710
Forrest	8,105	50.26%	7,832	48.56%	190	1.18%	-273	-1.69%	16,127
Franklin	2,051	62.30%	1,205	36.60%	36	1.09%	-846	-25.70%	3,292
George	2,755	49.19%	2,742	48.96%	104	1.86%	-13	-0.23%	5,601
Greene	1,407	47.03%	1,549	51.77%	36	1.20%	142	4.75%	2,992
Grenada	2,975	45.52%	3,502	53.59%	58	0.89%	527	8.06%	6,535
Hancock	6,026	47.88%	5,595	44.46%	964	7.66%	-431	-3.42%	12,585
Harrison	19,246	53.25%	16,120	44.60%	779	2.16%	-3,126	-8.65%	36,145
Hinds	28,389	42.65%	36,788	55.27%	1,385	2.08%	8,399	12.62%	66,562
Holmes	1,587	25.83%	4,465	72.67%	92	1.50%	2,878	46.84%	6,144
Humphreys	1,874	38.39%	2,844	58.25%	164	3.36%	970	19.87%	4,882
Issaquena	284	35.02%	494	60.91%	33	4.07%	210	25.89%	811
Itawamba	2,619	45.05%	3,121	53.69%	73	1.26%	502	8.64%	5,813
Jackson	17,736	56.33%	13,076	41.53%	676	2.15%	-4,660	-14.80%	31,488
Jasper	2,272	41.53%	3,104	56.74%	95	1.74%	832	15.21%	5,471
Jefferson	647	23.62%	2,053	74.95%	39	1.42%	1,406	51.33%	2,739
Jefferson Davis	1,912	39.41%	2,890	59.58%	49	1.01%	978	20.16%	4,851
Jones	10,501	54.03%	8,664	44.57%	272	1.40%	-1,837	-9.45%	19,437
Kemper	1,851	40.13%	2,682	58.14%	80	1.73%	831	18.01%	4,613
Lafayette	3,910	41.50%	5,390	57.21%	121	1.28%	1,480	15.71%	9,421
Lamar	7,844	60.35%	4,948	38.07%	205	1.58%	-2,896	-22.28%	12,997
Lauderdale	11,341	58.62%	7,684	39.72%	320	1.65%	-3,657	-18.90%	19,345
Lawrence	3,121	53.55%	2,627	45.08%	80	1.37%	-494	-8.48%	5,828
Leake	2,922	52.41%	2,589	46.44%	64	1.15%	-333	-5.97%	5,575
Lee	8,341	49.03%	8,501	49.97%	170	1.00%	160	0.94%	17,012
Leflore	3,824	42.32%	4,855	53.73%	357	3.95%	1,031	11.41%	9,036
Lincoln	7,408	65.60%	3,788	33.54%	97	0.86%	-3,620	-32.06%	11,293
Lowndes	8,131	50.52%	7,732	48.04%	231	1.44%	-399	-2.48%	16,094
Madison	13,228	59.68%	8,683	39.17%	254	1.15%	-4,545	-20.51%	22,165
Marion	4,694	54.36%	3,854	44.63%	87	1.01%	-840	-9.73%	8,635
Marshall	2,234	31.17%	4,845	67.60%	88	1.23%	2,611	36.43%	7,167
Monroe	3,687	40.07%	5,409	58.79%	105	1.14%	1,722	18.72%	9,201
Montgomery	1,991	44.59%	2,404	53.84%	70	1.57%	413	9.25%	4,465
Neshoba	3,849	53.70%	3,201	44.66%	118	1.65%	-648	-9.04%	7,168
Newton	3,723	60.34%	2,357	38.20%	90	1.46%	-1,366	-22.14%	6,170
Noxubee	1,487	31.03%	3,179	66.34%	126	2.63%	1,692	35.31%	4,792
Oktibbeha	5,014	47.18%	5,460	51.37%	154	1.45%	446	4.20%	10,628
Panola	2,095	22.49%	7,140	76.63%	82	0.88%	5,045	54.15%	9,317
Pearl River	7,213	53.41%	5,895	43.65%	398	2.95%	-1,318	-9.76%	13,506
Perry	1,892	53.80%	1,571	44.67%	54	1.54%	-321	-9.13%	3,517
Pike	6,025	47.68%	6,463	51.14%	149	1.18%	438	3.47%	12,637
Pontotoc	4,080	55.42%	3,175	43.13%	107	1.45%	-905	-12.29%	7,362
Prentiss	2,922	39.90%	4,271	58.32%	131	1.79%	1,349	18.42%	7,324
Quitman	852	24.47%	2,486	71.40%	144	4.14%	1,634	46.93%	3,482
Rankin	21,587	70.41%	8,751	28.54%	323	1.05%	-12,836	-41.86%	30,661
Scott	3,683	53.28%	3,148	45.54%	81	1.17%	-535	-7.74%	6,912
Sharkey	999	41.08%	1,376	56.58%	57	2.34%	377	15.50%	2,432
Simpson	5,272	56.11%	3,972	42.28%	151	1.61%	-1,300	-13.84%	9,395
Smith	3,092	56.08%	2,337	42.38%	85	1.54%	-755	-13.69%	5,514
Stone	2,349	49.59%	2,203	46.51%	185	3.91%	-146	-3.08%	4,737
Sunflower	2,685	38.06%	4,270	60.53%	99	1.40%	1,585	22.47%	7,054
Tallahatchie	1,819	34.24%	3,361	63.27%	132	2.48%	1,542	29.03%	5,312
Tate	1,935	32.86%	3,861	65.57%	92	1.56%	1,926	32.71%	5,888
Tippah	2,938	41.21%	3,999	56.09%	193	2.71%	1,061	14.88%	7,130
Tishomingo	2,083	41.73%	2,786	55.81%	123	2.46%	703	14.08%	4,992
Tunica	658	25.33%	1,829	70.40%	111	4.27%	1,171	45.07%	2,598
Union	3,145	44.59%	3,823	54.20%	85	1.21%	678	9.61%	7,053
Walthall	2,330	54.98%	1,813	42.78%	95	2.24%	-517	-12.20%	4,238
Warren	8,345	55.30%	6,564	43.50%	182	1.21%	-1,781	-11.80%	15,091
Washington	5,370	41.97%	7,123	55.67%	301	2.35%	1,753	13.70%	12,794
Wayne	3,111	43.71%	3,860	54.24%	146	2.05%	749	10.52%	7,117
Webster	2,491	55.25%	1,949	43.22%	69	1.53%	-542	-12.02%	4,509
Wilkinson	1,008	41.52%	1,356	55.85%	64	2.64%	348	14.33%	2,428
Winston	3,187	49.10%	3,224	49.67%	80	1.23%	37	0.57%	6,491
Yalobusha	1,588	37.65%	2,550	60.46%	80	1.90%	962	22.81%	4,218
Yazoo	4,314	47.66%	4,586	50.66%	152	1.68%	272	3.00%	9,052
Totals	370,691	48.52%	379,033	49.62%	14,213	1.86%	8,342	1.09%	763,937

Counties that flipped from Republican to Democratic

- Greene
- Grenada
- Itawamba
- Jasper
- Lafayette
- Lee
- Monroe
- Montgomery
- Prentiss
- Tate
- Tippah
- Tishomingo
- Union
- Wayne
- Winston
- Yazoo

Counties that flipped from Tied to Democratic

- Panola
