= Robert K. Dawson (public official) =

American lawyer

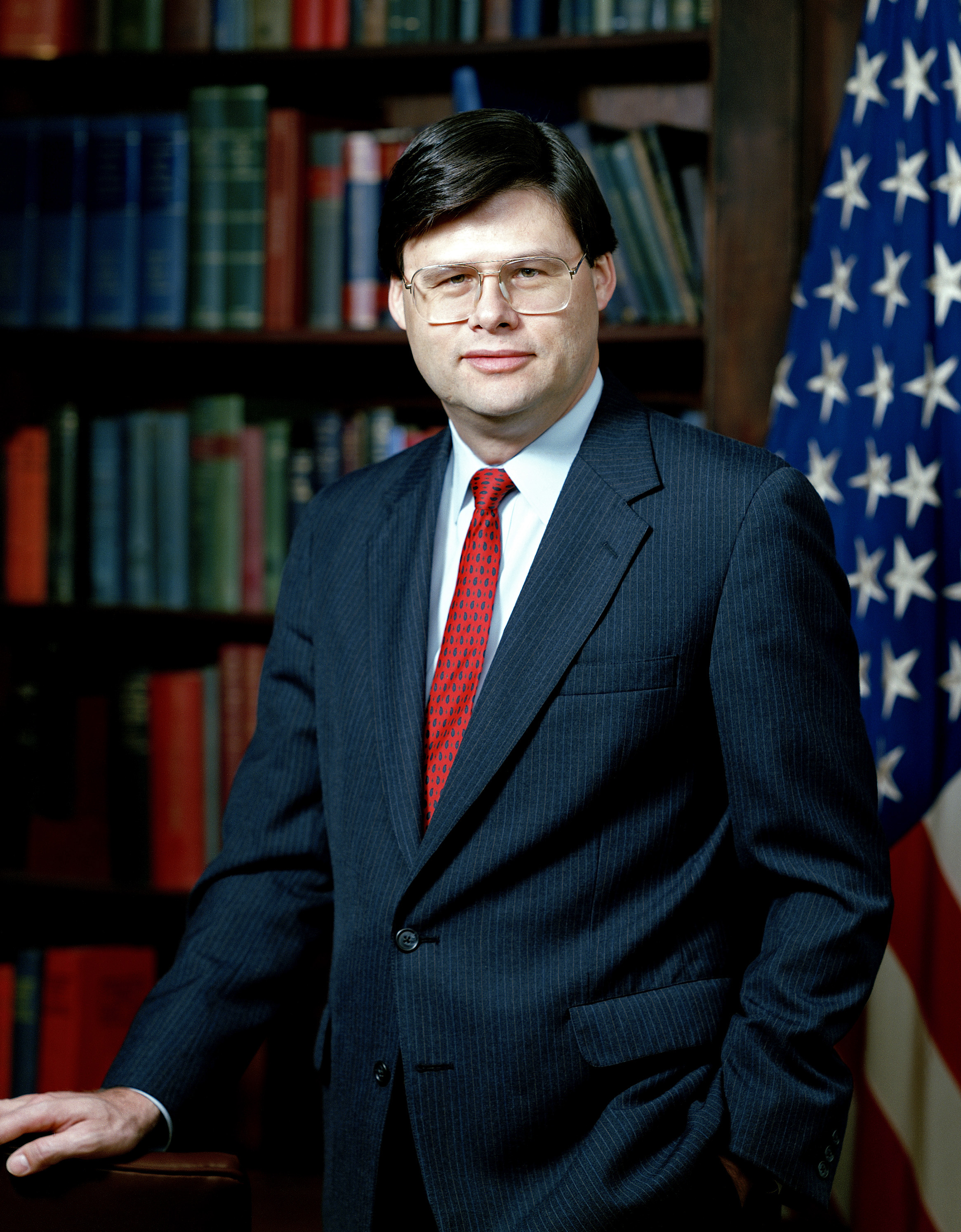
Robert K. Dawson in December 1986

Robert K. Dawson (born January 22, 1946) worked as United States Assistant Secretary of the Army (Civil Works) from 1985 to 1987.

== Biography ==
Robert K. Dawson was born in Scottsboro, Alabama. He was educated at Tulane University, which he attended on a football scholarship, graduating with a B.S. in psychology and chemistry in 1968. He then attended the Cumberland School of Law at Samford University, where he served on the editorial board of the Law Review and as student body president, receiving his J.D. in 1971 and gaining admittance to the State Bar of Alabama that same year.

After law school, Dawson moved to Washington, D.C. to become a legislative assistant of Rep. Jack Edwards (R–Ala. 1). In 1974, he became administrator of the U.S. House Committee on Public Works and Transportation.

He worked there until 1981, when he became Principal Deputy Assistant Secretary of the Army (Civil Works). He became Acting Assistant Secretary of the Army (Civil Works) in 1984. In June 1985, President of the United States Ronald Reagan nominated Dawson as Assistant Secretary of the Army (Civil Works), and, after Senate Confirmation, he held this office from December 1985 to May 1987. His major effort as Assistant Secretary of the Army (Civil Works) was achieving enactment of the Water Resources Development Act of 1986.

In 1987, Dawson became Director for Natural Resources, Science, and Technology for the Office of Management and Budget. In this capacity, he oversaw 1/4 of the United States federal budget, including the budgets of the Departments of the Interior, Agriculture, and Energy, NASA, Environmental Protection Agency, Tennessee Valley Authority, the Army Corps of Engineers Civil Works Program, the Council on Environmental Quality, the Nuclear Regulatory Commission, the Smithsonian Institution, the Woodrow Wilson International Center for Scholars, and the National Gallery of Art.

Dawson left government service in 1989 and became Vice Chairman at the lobbying firm Cassidy & Associates. In 1997, he founded Dawson & Associates, a lobbying firm specializing in federal water regulation and environmental permitting. His son, Stephen Dawson, serves as the company's Executive Vice President and Chief Counsel.

He is a member of the Alabama Bar and the Board of Governors at the Wesley Theological Seminary, Washington, D.C.

He is married to Susan Lee Dawson. They have two children and four grandchildren.

Government offices
Preceded by William Gianelli	Assistant Secretary of the Army (Civil Works); December 1985 – May 1987	Succeeded by Robert W. Page
