= Michael Blumenfeld =

American executive

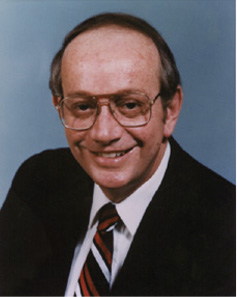

Assistant Secretary of the Army (Civil Works)
- In office April 1979 – January 1981
- President: Jimmy Carter
- Preceded by: Victor Veysey
- Succeeded by: William Gianelli

Personal details
- Born: November 10, 1934 Brooklyn, New York, U.S.
- Died: August 8, 2026 Lawrence Kansas USA
- Spouse: Catherine (Eck) Blumenfeld
- Education: Harvard College (B.A.); Harvard Business School (M.B.A.)

Michael Blumenfeld (born 1934) is an American executive who served as United States Assistant Secretary of the Army (Civil Works) from 1979 to 1981.

== Biography ==
Michael Blumenfeld was born in Brooklyn on November 10, 1934. He served in the United States Army from 1953 to 1956. He was educated at Harvard College, graduating with a B.A. in 1958. He then attended Harvard Business School, receiving an M.B.A. in 1960.

Upon graduation from business school, Blumenfeld took a job with Benton & Bowles, a New York advertising agency, as an assistant account executive. He worked at Benton & Bowles until 1967, becoming vice president and account supervisor. The accounts he managed included Zest, Gravy Train, Benson & Hedges, and The U.S. Committee for UNICEF.

In 1967, Blumenfeld joined the Equal Employment Opportunity Commission as Director of Public Affairs and Education.

He returned to the private sector in 1969, becoming assistant to the vice president, public affairs of Consolidated Edison. The next year, however, he joined the administration of New York Mayor John Lindsay as Deputy Health Services Administrator of New York City. From 1973 to 1977, he was the director of public affairs of New York University.

Mr. Blumenfeld was appointed Deputy Undersecretary of the Army in April, 1977, and shortly thereafter as Acting Assistant Secretary (Civil Works). President Carter nominated him as Assistant Secretary (ASA/CW) in January, 1979 and he received Senate confirmation later that year. As ASA(CW), he provided leadership to the Army Corps of Engineers, the Panama Canal Company, and the administration of the Arlington National Cemetery. In late 1979 he also became the first chairman of the bi-national Panama Canal Commission, which was established by the Panama Canal Treaties of 1977, to administer the Canal until the turnover to Panama December 31, 1999.

After leaving the Department of the Army, Blumenfeld worked as an executive at Harvard University, the Kansas Power and Light Company, and Empire Blue Cross and Blue Shield of New York. In 1999, Blumenfeld and his wife Cathy retired to Lawrence, Kansas. In retirement, he taught Western Civilization at the University of Kansas.

Government offices
Preceded by Victor Veysey	Assistant Secretary of the Army (Civil Works); April 1979 – January 1981	Succeeded by William Gianelli
