= John Paul Woodley Jr. =

American government executive (born 1953)

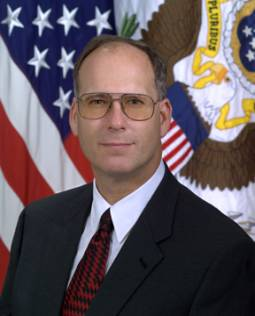

United States Assistant Secretary of the Army for Civil Works
- In office August 22, 2003 – April 2009
- President: George W. Bush; Barack Obama
- Preceded by: Michael Parker
- Succeeded by: Jo-Ellen Darcy

4th Virginia Secretary of Natural Resources
- In office January 1998 – October 2001
- Governor: Jim Gilmore
- Preceded by: Becky Norton Dunlop
- Succeeded by: Ron Hamm

Personal details
- Born: John Paul Woodley Jr. September 28, 1953 (age 73) Shreveport, Louisiana, U.S.
- Party: Republican
- Education: Washington and Lee University (BA, JD)

Military service
- Allegiance: United States
- Branch/service: United States Army
- Years of service: 1979–1985
- Unit: J.A.G. Corps

John Paul Woodley Jr. (born September 28, 1953) was United States Assistant Secretary of the Army (Civil Works) from 2003 to 2009.

== Biography ==
John Paul Woodley Jr. was raised in Shreveport, Louisiana. He attended Washington and Lee University on an Army Reserve Officers' Training Corps scholarship, receiving a B.A. in 1974. He then attended the Washington and Lee University School of Law, graduating with a J.D. in 1977.

On active duty in the United States Army, Woodley served in the Judge Advocate General's Corps, United States Army from 1979 to 1985.

In 1994, Woodley became Deputy Attorney General of Virginia for Government Operations, in which capacity he oversaw litigation involving various Virginia state agencies' administration, finance, transportation, economic development, and natural resources.

In January 1998, Governor of Virginia Jim Gilmore appointed Woodley to his cabinet as Secretary of Natural Resources.

In October 2001, President of the United States George W. Bush named Woodley Assistant Deputy Undersecretary of Defense (Environment). In 2003, President Bush used his recess appointment powers to appoint Woodley Assistant Secretary of the Army (Civil Works) and he held this office from August 22, 2003, until December 8, 2004, when his recess appointment expired. In 2005, President Bush nominated Woodley as Assistant Secretary of the Army (Civil Works), and, after Senate confirmation, Woodley held this office from May 16, 2005 until April 2009.

Since leaving the United States Department of the Army, Woodley has worked for the consulting and lobbying firm Advantus Strategies.

Political offices
Preceded by Becky Norton Dunlop	Virginia Secretary of Natural Resources; 1998–2001	Succeeded by Ron Hamm
Government offices
Preceded by Michael Parker	Assistant Secretary of the Army (Civil Works); 2003–2009	Succeeded by Jo-Ellen Darcy
