= Mark Averill =

American retired Colonel

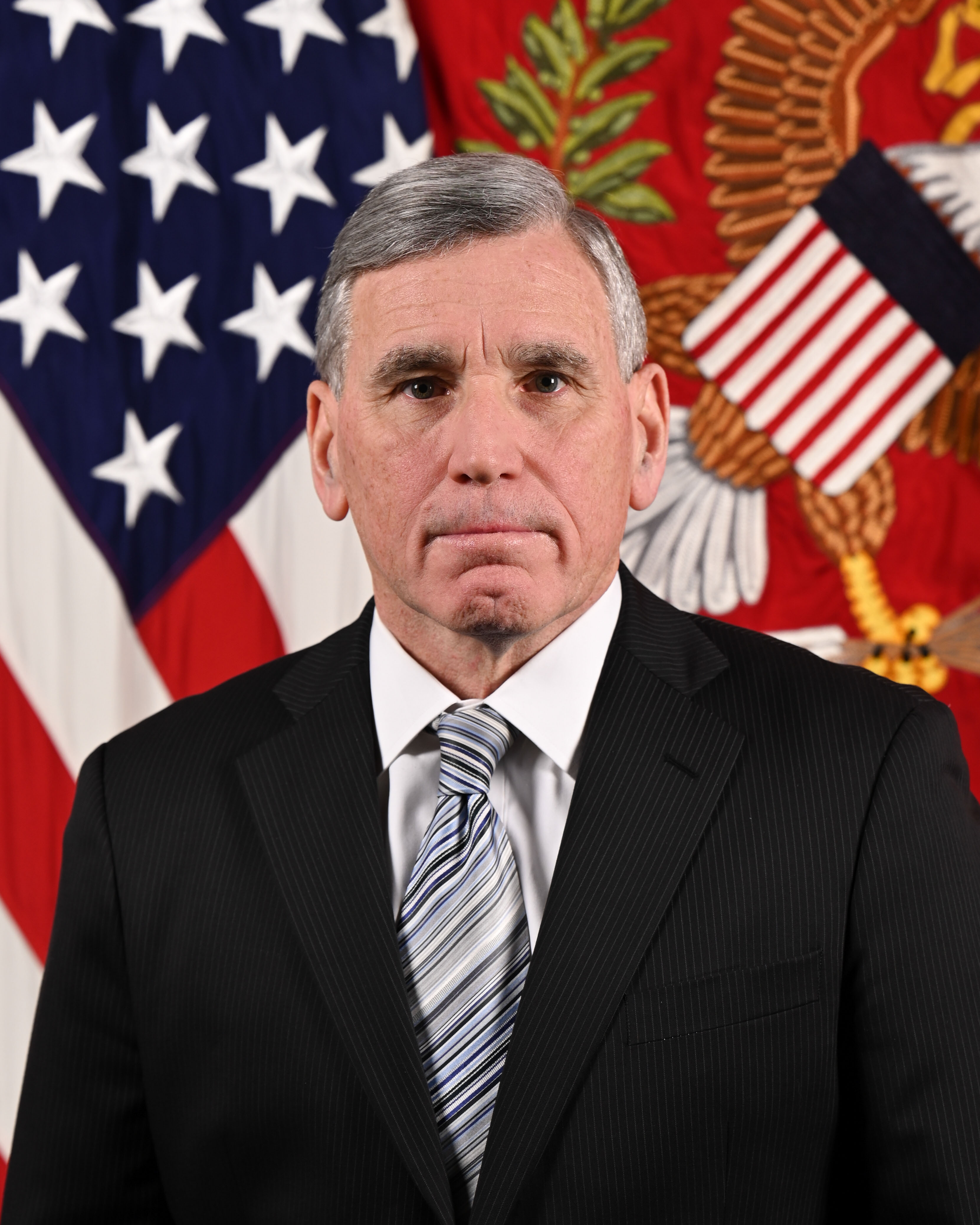
- Official portrait, 2025

Acting United States Secretary of the Army
- In office January 20, 2025 – February 25, 2025
- President: Donald Trump
- Deputy: David R. Fitzgerald (acting)
- Preceded by: Christine Wormuth
- Succeeded by: Daniel P. Driscoll

Personal details
- Spouse: Mary Averill
- Education: United States Military Academy (BS); Marine Corps University (MS)

Military service
- Allegiance: United States
- Branch/service: United States Army
- Rank: Colonel

Mark F. Averill is an American retired Colonel who was the acting United States secretary of the Army from January 2025 from February 2025.

Prior to his appointment, Averill was the administrative assistant to the secretary of the Army, where he was the senior career civilian in the United States Army.

From December 2013 to January 2022, Averill was the deputy administrative assistant to the secretary of the Army and executive director of the US Army Resources and Programs Agency in HQDA. He was also the director of resource management, Office of the Deputy Chief of Staff, G-4; director of force projection and distribution, Office of the Deputy Chief of Staff, G-4; and chief of the Army Requirements and Resourcing Board, Office of the Deputy Chief of Staff G-3/5/7.

He is a member of the Association of the United States Army.

== Education ==
Averill attended the Marine Corps War College, the Marine Corps School of Advanced Warfighting, and the Marine Corps Command and Staff College.

Averill holds a Bachelor of Science from the United States Military Academy at West Point, NY and a Master of Science in Strategic Studies from the Marine Corps University.

== Career ==
On January 20, 2025, President Donald Trump appointed Averill the acting United States secretary of the Army.

Political offices
Preceded by Christine Wormuth	United States Secretary of the Army; Acting; 2025	Succeeded by Daniel P. Driscoll
