= Robert W. Page =

American businessman

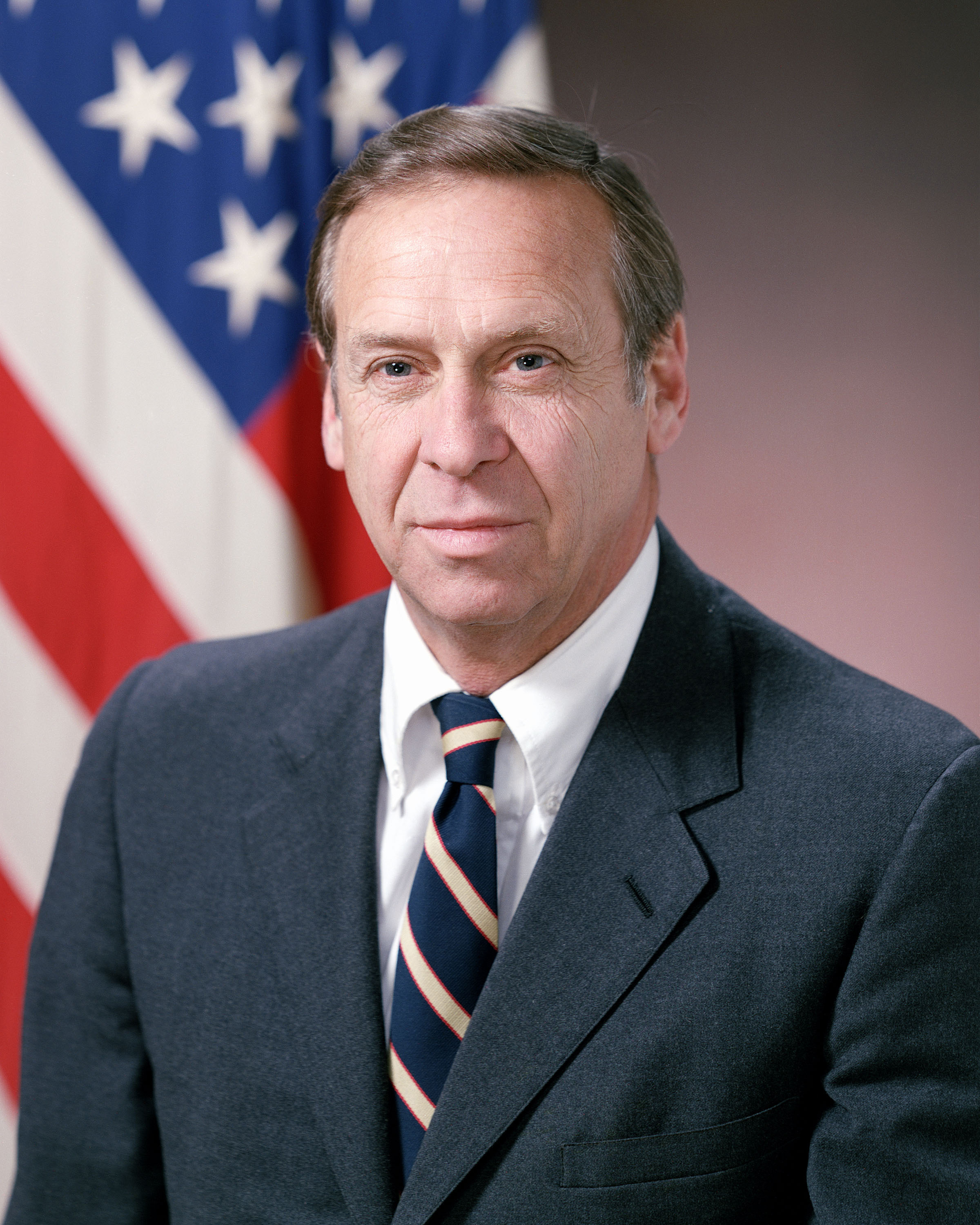
- Page in 1987

Assistant Secretary of the Army (Civil Works)
- In office December 1987 – October 1990
- President: Ronald Reagan; George H. W. Bush
- Preceded by: Robert K. Dawson
- Succeeded by: Nancy P. Dorn

Personal details
- Born: Robert Wesley Page; January 22, 1927 Dallas, Texas, U.S.
- Died: June 29, 2010 (aged 83) Washington, D.C., U.S.
- Spouse: Nancy Anne Eaton (m. 1952)
- Children: 4
- Occupation: Businessman

Military service
- Allegiance: United States
- Branch/service: United States Navy
- Battles/wars: World War II

Robert Wesley Page (January 22, 1927 – June 29, 2010) was an American businessman who served as United States Assistant Secretary of the Army (Civil Works) from 1987 to 1990.

== Biography ==
Page was born on January 22, 1927, in Dallas, Texas. During World War II, he served in the United States Navy in the Pacific Theater. After the war, he attended Texas A&M University, graduating with a B.S. in 1951.

Page was recruited by the Central Intelligence Agency after graduation. He spent over two years with the agency, including an assignment in Iran. Later in the 1950s, Page taught engineering at the American University of Beirut.

From 1961 to 1962, Page was vice president of the Southeast Drilling Company. He was assistant general manager at Bechtel from 1962 to 1967. In 1967, he became vice president of construction of Rockefeller Family and Associates, working there until 1972 when he became president and CEO of the George A. Fuller Co. From 1976 to 1981, he was president and CEO of the Rust Engineering Co. He became president and CEO of M.W. Kellogg in 1981, and was then president and CEO of Kellogg Rust, Inc. from 1983 to 1984. He remained at Kellogg, Rust, Inc. until 1987. He was Chairman of the Panama Canal Commission from December 1985 until May 1987.

In 1987, President of the United States Ronald Reagan nominated Page as Assistant Secretary of the Army (Civil Works), and he assumed office in December 1987. He was later re-nominated to the post by George H. W. Bush and served as Assistant Secretary until October 1990.

After leaving government service, Page was executive vice president of McDermott International, Inc., from 1991 until 1994.

== Personal ==
Page was the son of Archie Cleo Page (December 20, 1899 – May 4, 1980) and Zelma Tyler (September 4, 1910 – March 20, 1967), who were married on March 28, 1925 but later divorced.

Page married Nancy Anne Eaton on July 13, 1952, in Springfield, Massachusetts. The couple had three sons and a daughter.

Page died at his home in the Georgetown neighborhood of Washington, D.C., on June 29, 2010.

Government offices
Preceded by Robert K. Dawson	Assistant Secretary of the Army (Civil Works); December 1987 – October 1990	Succeeded by Nancy P. Dorn
