= Ronnie Shows =

American politician (born 1947)

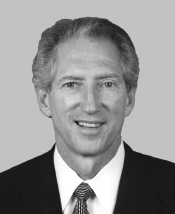

Member of the U.S. House of Representatives from Mississippi's 4th district
- In office January 3, 1999 – January 3, 2003
- Preceded by: Mike Parker
- Succeeded by: Chip Pickering (redistricted)

Member of the Mississippi State Senate
- In office January 8, 1980 – January 5, 1988
- Preceded by: Ike Sanford
- Succeeded by: Billy Harvey
- Constituency: 42nd district (1980–1984); 41st district (1984–1988)

Personal details
- Born: Clifford Ronald Shows; January 26, 1947 (age 79) Moselle, Mississippi, U.S.
- Party: Democratic
- Education: University of Southern Mississippi (BS)

Clifford Ronald Shows (born January 26, 1947) is an American educator and former Democratic member of the United States House of Representatives from Mississippi. He served two terms in Congress from 1999 to 2003.

== Biography ==
Shows was born in Moselle, Mississippi on January 26, 1947. He graduated from Moselle High School in 1965 and from the University of Southern Mississippi in 1971, earning degrees in education and political science. Shows worked as a teacher, before being elected as circuit clerk of Jefferson Davis County in 1976. From 1980 until 1988, he was a member of the Mississippi State Senate. After the senate, he was elected to the Mississippi Transportation Commission for the Southern District; he served from 1988-1998.

=== Congress ===
A Democrat, Shows was elected to Congress in 1998 and represented Mississippi's 4th district from January 3, 1999, until January 3, 2003. In 2002, Shows was pitted against fellow Congressman Chip Pickering, a Republican from the neighboring 3rd District, after Mississippi lost a seat in the 2000 Congressional redistricting. Shows' Jackson-based district was dismantled and split between three neighboring districts. The largest chunk, including his home in Bassfield, was placed in Pickering's district. The new district heavily favored Pickering; notably, it was seven points whiter than Shows' old district and contained over 60 percent of Pickering's former territory. Pickering soundly defeated Shows with over 60% of the vote in the new 3rd District.

In the 107th Congress, Shows introduced the Federal Marriage Amendment with 22 cosponsors and would have amended the U.S. Constitution to define marriage as legally between one man and one woman. The Amendment failed to advance in Congress.

Shows is a resident of Bassfield, Mississippi.

U.S. House of Representatives
Preceded by Mike Parker	Member of the U.S. House of Representatives from Mississippi's 4th congressional district 1999–2003	Succeeded by Gene Taylor
U.S. order of precedence (ceremonial)
Preceded by Webb Franklin as Former U.S. Representative	Order of precedence of the United States as Former U.S. Representative	Succeeded by David D. Phelps as Former U.S. Representative
