= Daniel P. Driscoll =

American politician (born 1986)

Dan Driscoll
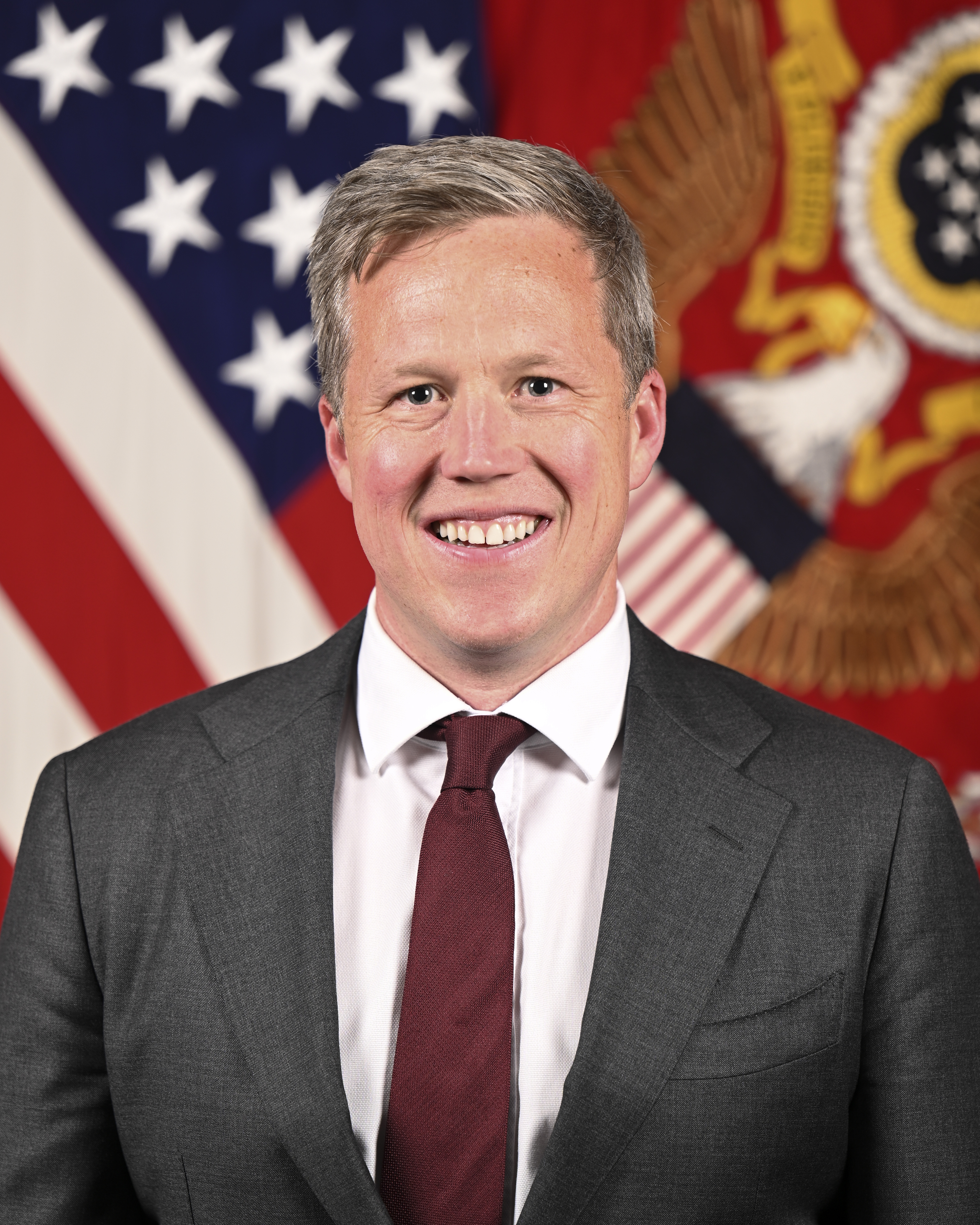
- Official portrait, 2025

26th United States Secretary of the Army
- In office February 25, 2025 – September 2, 2026
- President: Donald Trump
- Deputy: David Fitzgerald (acting); Mike Obadal
- Preceded by: Christine Wormuth
- Succeeded by: Adam Telle (acting)

Acting Director of the Bureau of Alcohol, Tobacco, Firearms and Explosives
- In office April 10, 2025 – April 30, 2026
- President: Donald Trump
- Preceded by: Kash Patel (acting)
- Succeeded by: Robert Cekada

Personal details
- Born: Daniel Patrick Driscoll; 1986 (age 39–40) Boone, North Carolina, U.S.
- Party: Republican
- Spouse: Cassie Driscoll
- Children: 2
- Education: University of North Carolina, Chapel Hill (BS); Yale University (JD)

Military service
- Branch/service: United States Army
- Years of service: 2007–2011
- Rank: First Lieutenant
- Battles/wars: Iraq War
- Awards: Army Commendation Medal; Ranger tab; Combat Action Badge

Daniel Patrick Driscoll (born 1986) is an American investment banker and former military officer who served as the United States secretary of the Army from 2025 to 2026. Driscoll additionally served as the acting director of the Bureau of Alcohol, Tobacco, Firearms and Explosives from 2025 to 2026.

Driscoll graduated from the University of North Carolina, Chapel Hill with a bachelor's degree in 2007. He served in the United States Army for four years, eventually becoming a first lieutenant. Driscoll graduated from Yale Law School with a Juris Doctor in 2014. He worked at several investment firms in North Carolina. After North Carolina representative Mark Meadows announced that he would resign to serve as the White House chief of staff in December 2019, Driscoll ran in the United States House of Representatives election to succeed him. Driscoll lost the Republican primary in March 2020.

In December 2024, President-elect Donald Trump named Driscoll as his nominee to serve as the United States secretary of the Army. The Senate voted to confirm Driscoll in February 2025. As the secretary of the Army, Driscoll was involved in modernizing the Army's technology. He was closely aligned with General Randy George, the Army's chief of staff. Amid a dispute with Secretary of Defense Pete Hegseth, Driscoll resigned in September 2026.

== Early life, military service, and education (1986–2014) ==
Daniel Patrick Driscoll was born in 1986 in Boone, North Carolina. Driscoll's grandfather was a decoder in World War II, and his father was an infantryman in the Vietnam War. Driscoll was raised in Banner Elk, North Carolina. He graduated from Watauga High School in May 2004, where he met his eventual wife, Cassie; they have two children. Driscoll graduated from the University of North Carolina, Chapel Hill in May 2007.

Driscoll graduated from the Officer Candidate School and became a commissioned officer in the United States Army in August 2007. He was deployed as part of the 10th Mountain Division to Iraq from October 2009 to July 2010. In the 10th Mountain Division, Driscoll was a cavalry scout. He completed the Ranger School. Driscoll left military service in March 2011 as a first lieutenant.

Driscoll attended Yale Law School on the G.I. Bill and the Elliot Goldstein Scholarship for corporate law students, graduating in 2014 with a Juris Doctor. At Yale University, Driscoll became an associate of JD Vance. He was involved in the Yale Veterans Legal Services Clinic, held an externship with a U.S. attorney's office, and interned for the Senate Committee on Veterans' Affairs. Driscoll later clerked for Chief Judge Alex Kozinski of the Court of Appeals for the Ninth Circuit. He additionally received a Yale Law School grant to serve as an observer at the Guantanamo Bay detention camp.

== Career ==
=== Private equity (2014–2025) ===
After graduating from Yale, Driscoll began working at BlackArch Partners. By February 2016, he had become an associate at BlackArch and was involved in advocating for General Electric to move its headquarters to North Carolina. Driscoll briefly quit his job after the birth of his first child. By May 2018, Driscoll had become the director of business innovation at the investment firm 100watt. He later served as the chief operating officer of Flex Capital.

=== U.S. congressional campaign in North Carolina (2019–2020) ===
After North Carolina representative Mark Meadows announced that he would resign to serve as the White House chief of staff in December 2019, Driscoll announced that he would run in the United States House of Representatives election for North Carolina's eleventh congressional district. According to Driscoll, Meadows's resignation accelerated his family's plans to move to Western North Carolina. His campaign was oriented around national security issues. By February 2020, Driscoll had garnered nearly US$500,000, receiving significant funding from the With Honor Fund. In the Republican primary in March, Driscoll received the sixth most votes in an election that resulted in a runoff between the businesswoman Lynda Bennett and the political aide Madison Cawthorn.

== Secretary of the Army (2025–2026) ==
=== Nomination and confirmation ===
On December 4, 2024, President-elect Donald Trump named Driscoll as his nominee to serve as the United States secretary of the Army. Driscoll appeared before the Senate Committee on Armed Services on January 30, 2025. He told the committee that he would seek to resolve the Army's recruiting crisis by using non-monetary incentives, including expanding the Junior Reserve Officers' Training Corps and the Future Soldier Prep Course. Driscoll's hearing occurred the day after a passenger jet and an Army helicopter collided over the Potomac River; Driscoll stated that he would consider ending flight training in high-traffic areas. The Senate Committee on Armed Services voted to advance Driscoll's nomination on February 11. The Senate voted to confirm Driscoll in a 66–28 vote on February 25. He was the youngest person to be confirmed as the secretary of the Army.

=== Tenure ===
Driscoll is sworn in by Vice President JD Vance in February 2025

Driscoll was sworn in by Vice President JD Vance on February 28, 2025. That month, Driscoll and Elbridge Colby, Trump's nominee to serve as the under secretary of defense for policy, allegedly proposed to Secretary of Defense Pete Hegseth that the Department of Defense's civilian harm mitigation and response be eliminated, according to the Office of Inspector General of the United States Department of Defense. In April, Hegseth ordered Driscoll to "implement a comprehensive transformation strategy"; in response, Driscoll and General Randy George, the chief of staff of the Army, announced the Army Transformation Initiative.

The Army Transformation Initiative's initial measures included swearing in four technology executives as lieutenant colonels in the Army Reserve, cutting production on vehicles such as the M10 Booker, and consolidating the Futures and Training and Doctrine Commands. In an interview with Axios in May, Driscoll stated that he had received "air cover" for the initiative amid criticism from lawmakers. In June 2025, Driscoll revised the Army Transformation Initiative to target "procurement, reorganizing and reshuffling, and firing". He sought to revise the Army's process of purchasing technology towards commercially available products, as opposed to bespoke projects, and established a program, SkyFoundry, for increasing drone manufacturing capacity.

Driscoll was involved in planning the United States Army 250th Anniversary Parade in June 2025. In July, Driscoll directed the United States Military Academy to review its hiring policies and to rescind its employment offer to Jen Easterly, the former director of the Cybersecurity and Infrastructure Security Agency. That month, Driscoll met with Hawaii governor Josh Green to continue using land leased for the Pohakuloa Training Area. According to Ohio governor Mike DeWine, Driscoll requested additional National Guard troops to be deployed to Washington, D.C. in August. At an Association of the United States Army meeting in October, Driscoll stated that he wanted to "get human stupidity out of the way" to fix quality-of-life issues on bases.

In November 2025, Trump dispatched Driscoll, George, and General Chris Donahue, the commanding general of United States Army Europe and Africa, to Kyiv to negotiate an end to the Russo-Ukrainian war. According to The Wall Street Journal, the decision to send them to Ukraine was motivated by a belief that Russia would be open to negotiating with officials in the U.S. military. Axios later reported that Vance had suggested sending Driscoll to Ukraine. Driscoll met with Ukrainian president Volodymyr Zelenskyy in Kyiv; with European officials—alongside Secretary of State Marco Rubio—in Geneva; and with Russian officials in Abu Dhabi. He presented Zelenskyy with Trump's 28-point peace plan.

=== Conflict with Hegseth and resignation ===
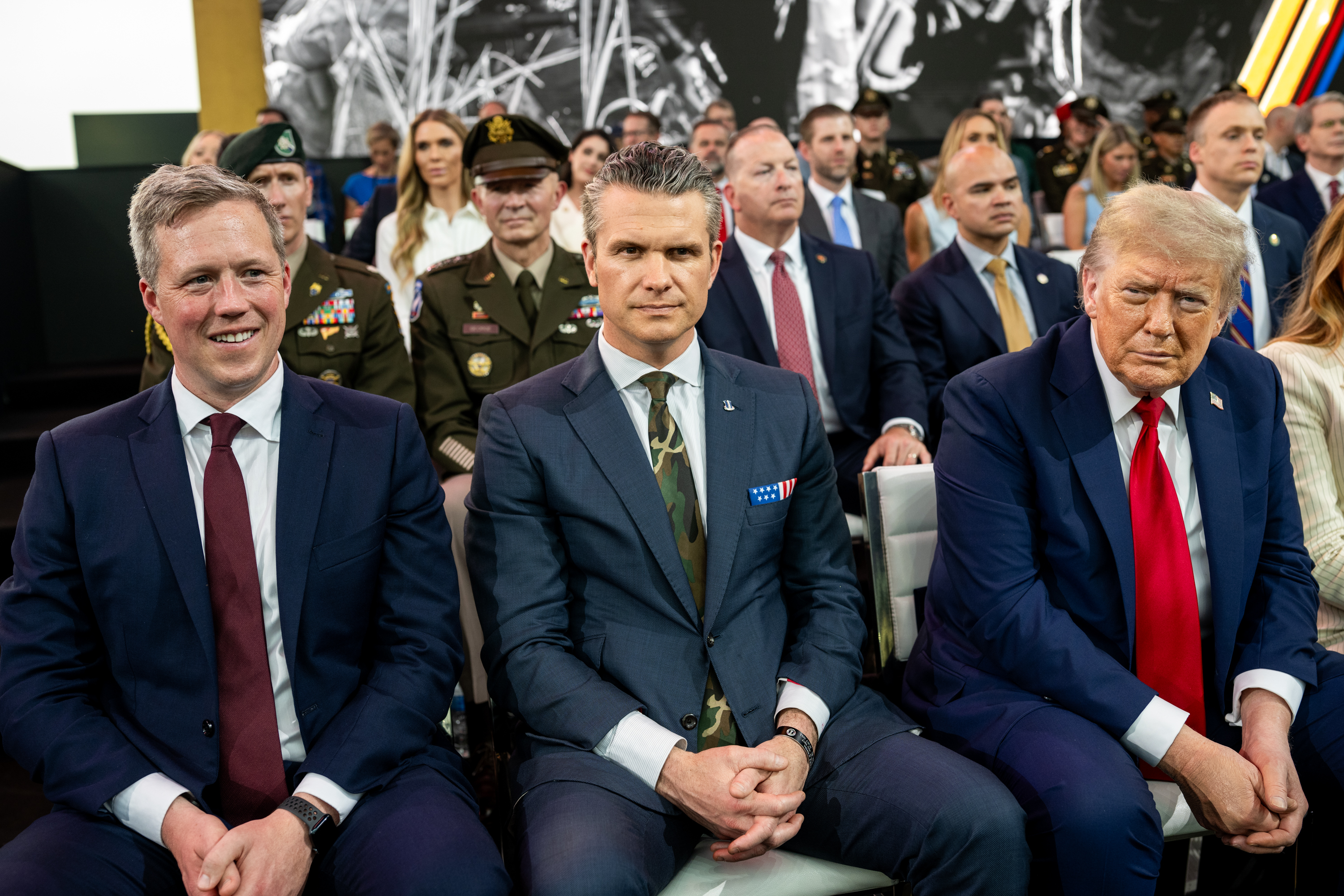
Driscoll (left) and Hegseth (center) in June 2025

According to The Hill, Hegseth began an internal conflict with Driscoll after Trump named the latter to lead negotiations to end the Russo-Ukrainian war; Hegseth was reportedly concerned by rumors that Driscoll was his possible successor. In February 2026, Hegseth fired one of Driscoll's advisors, Colonel David Butler. The following month, The New York Times reported that Hegseth had asked Driscoll to block the promotions of two Black and two female officers to be one-star generals; Driscoll repeatedly refused the request, citing their experience. The conflict between Hegseth and Driscoll intensified after Hegseth fired George, a Driscoll ally.

In August 2026, The Wall Street Journal reported that Driscoll was expected to resign by the end of the year amid his conflict with Hegseth. Driscoll's decision occurred as peace efforts in Ukraine had stalled and his modernization effort had been scaled back. According to The New York Times, Driscoll and Hegseth were "barely on speaking terms". The Atlantic later reported that Driscoll had brought his concerns about Hegseth's purge of generals directly to Trump. Trump purportedly urged Driscoll to remain in his position through that year's elections, according to The Washington Post; the Trump administration disputed the account of Driscoll's meeting with Trump. On August 31, the Journal reported that Driscoll had submitted his resignation. Driscoll left the Department of the Army on September 2.

== Acting Director of the Bureau of Alcohol, Tobacco, Firearms and Explosives (2025–2026) ==
On April 9, 2025, Driscoll was appointed as the acting director of the Bureau of Alcohol, Tobacco, Firearms and Explosives, succeeding Kash Patel, the director of the Federal Bureau of Investigation. Driscoll was formally sworn in the following day. According to The New York Times, officials in the Trump administration decided to appoint Driscoll shortly after Patel became the acting director in February, but had not informed Driscoll of their decision until his appointment. Robert Cekada was confirmed as the director of the Bureau of Alcohol, Tobacco, Firearms and Explosives in April 2026.

== Views ==
While running for North Carolina's eleventh congressional district in 2020, Driscoll advocated for constructing President Donald Trump's border wall, lowering taxes, and job creation through deregulation.

== Awards and decorations ==
Driscoll's awards and decorations include:

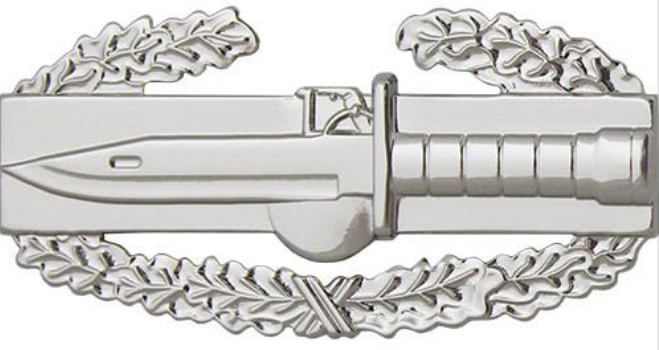

Combat Action Badge
Army Commendation Medal	National Defense Service Medal	Iraq Campaign Medal with one campaign star
Global War on Terrorism Service Medal	Army Service Ribbon	Overseas Service Ribbon

== Electoral history ==
2020 United States House of Representatives Republican Party primary for North Carolina's eleventh congressional district
Party	Candidate	Votes	%
Republican	Lynda Bennett	20,510	22.7
Republican	Madison Cawthorn	18,418	20.4
Republican	Jim Davis	17,400	19.3
Republican	Chuck Archerd	8,233	9.1
Republican	Wayne King	7,834	8.7
Republican	Dan Driscoll	7,768	8.6
Republican	Joey Osborne	6,420	7.1
Republican	Vance Patterson	2,228	2.5
Republican	Matthew Burril	520	0.6
Republican	Albert Wiley	389	0.4
Republican	Dillon Gentry	382	0.4
Republican	Steven Fekete	175	0.2
Total votes		90,277	100.0

Political offices
Preceded by Christine Wormuth	United States Secretary of the Army; 2025–2026	Succeeded by Adam Telle; Acting
Preceded by Kash Patel; Acting	Director of the Bureau of Alcohol, Tobacco, Firearms and Explosives; Acting; 2025–2026	Succeeded by Robert Cekada
