= Judge Estes =

Judge Estes may refer to:

- Joe Ewing Estes (1903–1989), judge of the United States District Court for the Northern District of Texas
- William Lee Estes (1870–1930), judge of the United States District Court for the Eastern District of Texas
