= Jane Boyle =

Jane Boyle may refer to:

- Jane J. Boyle (born 1954), American judge
- Jane Boyle (curler) (born 1973), Canadian curler
