= Barefoot Sanders =

American judge (1925–2008)

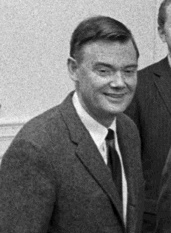
- Sanders in 1969

Senior Judge of the United States District Court for the Northern District of Texas
- In office January 1, 1996 – September 21, 2008

Chief Judge of the United States District Court for the Northern District of Texas
- In office 1989–1995
- Preceded by: Robert William Porter
- Succeeded by: Jerry Buchmeyer

Judge of the United States District Court for the Northern District of Texas
- In office April 26, 1979 – January 1, 1996
- Appointed by: Jimmy Carter
- Preceded by: Seat established
- Succeeded by: Barbara M. Lynn

White House Director of Legislative Affairs
- In office May 1967 – January 20, 1969
- President: Lyndon B. Johnson
- Preceded by: Larry O'Brien (1965)
- Succeeded by: Bryce Harlow

United States Assistant Attorney General for the Civil Division
- In office 1966–1967
- President: Lyndon B. Johnson
- Preceded by: John W. Douglas
- Succeeded by: Edwin Weisl

United States Attorney for the Northern District of Texas
- In office 1961–1965
- President: John F. Kennedy; Lyndon B. Johnson
- Preceded by: William West
- Succeeded by: Melvin Diggs

Member of the Texas House of Representatives from the 51-4 district
- In office January 13, 1953 – January 13, 1959
- Preceded by: Constituency established
- Succeeded by: Tom James

Personal details
- Born: Harold Barefoot Sanders Jr. February 5, 1925 Dallas, Texas, U.S.
- Died: September 21, 2008 (aged 83) Dallas, Texas, U.S.
- Party: Democratic
- Children: 4
- Education: University of Texas, Austin (BA, JD)

Harold Barefoot Sanders Jr. (February 5, 1925 – September 21, 2008) was an American attorney, politician, and jurist who served as a United States district judge of the United States District Court for the Northern District of Texas and counsel to President Lyndon B. Johnson. He was best known for overseeing the lawsuit to desegregate the Dallas Independent School District.

== Early life ==
Sanders was born in Dallas, Texas to H.B. Sanders and the former May Elizabeth Forrester. "Barefoot" was the maiden name of his paternal grandmother, Dennie Barefoot. Early in his life, Sanders went by "H.B." He graduated from North Dallas High School in 1942. He served in the United States Navy during World War II between 1943 and 1946. While attending the University of Texas, Sanders was elected student body president in 1947. He was affiliated with Phi Delta Theta, Blue Key, Phi Delta Phi, Phi Delta Kappa and the Texas Cowboys. Sanders received a Bachelor of Arts degree from the University of Texas at Austin in 1949, and a Juris Doctor in 1950 from the University of Texas School of Law.

== Career ==
Sanders worked in private practice with the Dallas law firm of Clark, West, Keller, Sanders and Butler from 1950 through 1961 and from 1969 until 1979.

=== Texas House of Representatives ===
A Democrat, Sanders served in the Texas House of Representatives from 1953 to 1959. During his tenure in the Texas Legislature, he sponsored the Texas Securities Act, the Texas Probate Code, the Texas Mental Health Code, and legislation creating the Trinity River Authority. In 1958, Sanders ran for Texas's 5th congressional district, but lost in the general election to Republican incumbent Bruce Alger.

=== United States Attorney ===
In 1961, President John F. Kennedy appointed Sanders United States Attorney for the Northern District of Texas, a position he held until 1965. During his time as United States Attorney, Sanders played a minor role in the transition of power between Presidents Kennedy and Johnson following Kennedy's assassination in Dallas on November 22, 1963. Sanders was, according to an interview, tasked with finding Federal District Judge Sarah T. Hughes to administer the oath of office to Johnson:

LBJ called Irving Goldberg from the plane and asked, "Who can swear me in?" Goldberg called me, and I said, "Well, we know a federal judge can." Then I got a call from the president's plane, with the command "Find Sarah Hughes." Coincidentally, Judge Hughes, Jan [Judge Sanders's wife] and I were supposed to go to Austin that night for a dinner for President Kennedy. I reached her at home and said, "They need you to swear in the vice president at Love Field. Please get out there." She said, "Is there an oath?" I said, "Yes, but we haven't found it yet." She said, "Don't worry about it; I'll make one up." She was very resourceful, you know. By the time she got to the airplane, someone had already called it into the plane. We quickly realized that it is in the Constitution.

=== Johnson administration ===
From 1965 to 1967, Sanders served as Assistant Deputy Attorney General and Assistant Attorney General in the United States Department of Justice in Washington, D.C. and was instrumental in the passage of the Voting Rights Act of 1965. In 1967, President Lyndon Johnson appointed him Legislative Counsel to the President to manage the White House legislative program.

In 1968, Johnson nominated Sanders to a seat on the United States Court of Appeals for the District of Columbia Circuit. Johnson's presidency ended before the United States Senate cast a vote on Sanders's nomination, and President Richard Nixon did not renominate Sanders. Nixon appointed George MacKinnon to that seat instead.

=== 1972 United States Senate campaign ===
In 1972, Sanders ran for the United States Senate. He narrowly defeated former US Senator Ralph Yarborough in the Democratic primary runoff, but lost the general election to incumbent Republican John Tower.

=== Federal judicial service ===
On February 6, 1979, President Jimmy Carter nominated Sanders to a new seat on the United States District Court for the Northern District of Texas created by 92 Stat. 1629. He was confirmed by the United States Senate on April 24, 1979, and received his commission two days later. Sanders served as chief judge of the Northern District of Texas from 1989 to 1995. During his tenure as a federal district judge, Sanders held many positions on committees related to the function of the judiciary. He served as chair of the Judicial Conference Committee on the Judicial Branch (1994–97); as a member of the Judicial Panel on Multidistrict Litigation (1992–2000); and as chair, National Conference of Federal Trial Judges, American Bar Association (1988–89). He assumed senior status on January 1, 1996, and inactive senior status on July 7, 2006. His service was terminated by his death on September 21, 2008.

==== Dallas ISD desegregation lawsuit ====
Though Sanders handled thousands of civil and criminal cases during his tenure as a federal judge, he is best known in Texas for his role as judge in the Tasby v. Estes litigation brought against the Dallas Independent School District in the 1970s, in which plaintiff Sam Tasby charged that the Dallas ISD was still a segregated school district. The litigation began before Sanders became a federal judge, but he took over the case until its conclusion in 2003, and had oversight of many Dallas ISD activities related to racial balance until that time. Though the Tasby litigation was not the first desegregation lawsuit against Dallas ISD, it is the most famous.

Until 1961, Dallas was the largest city in the South with a segregated school system. That same year, the Dallas ISD school board implemented a desegregation plan – the so-called Stairstep Plan – under order of the Fifth Circuit Court of Appeals. In September of that year, eighteen black students started first grade classes in what had been whites-only institutions.

In spite of tremendous dissatisfaction with Dallas ISD and continual complaints by the Dallas NAACP, Dallas ISD declared itself desegregated in 1967. Litigation that continued for three more decades proved that declaration inappropriate. Sam Tasby filed a lawsuit against Dallas ISD charging discrimination prohibited under Brown v. Board of Education on October 6, 1970. Federal Judge William M. Taylor presided over a trial of the case from July 12 to July 16, 1971. He ordered the school district to create a new desegregation plan, which the district published on July 23, 1971.

Four years later, in July 1975, the United States Court of Appeals for the Fifth Circuit rejected several parts of the plan and ordered a new desegregation plan implemented by January 1976. Other parties, including the NAACP, were added to the suit. On February 2, 1976, Judge Taylor presided over a second desegregation trial, and by April, a new desegregation plan was issued. The Fifth Circuit rejected most of this plan as well. The most controversial part of this plan centered around busing, and Judge Taylor held an additional hearing on the case. Taylor removed himself from the case on March 21, 1981, to "avoid any further possibility that a desegregation plan might be overturned," and the case was assigned to Judge Sanders.

After additional hearings, Sanders ruled that Dallas ISD continued to show signs of racial segregation, but concluded that busing would not solve the problem. He ordered parties to submit new desegregation plans, and then issued his own, ordering:

This Judgment constitutes the Desegregation Plan for the Dallas Independent School District ("DISD" or "the District") and is rendered pursuant to, and is to be construed in the light of and consistent with, (1) the Court's Memorandum Opinion dated August 3, 1981; (2) the Stipulation dated December 1, 1981, and approved by the Court on December 2, 1981; and (3) the Court's Memorandum Opinions and Orders dated December 7, 1981; December 21, 1981; January 4, 1982; and February 1, 1982. This Judgment supersedes the final judgment rendered by this Court in 1976. All programs provided for in this Judgment must be initiated by the beginning of the DISD 1982-83 school year, or sooner if feasible, unless otherwise herein provided.

The school district fought Sanders decision until August 1983, when the Fifth Circuit upheld Sanders' plan; at that time, the Dallas ISD board of trustees unanimously accepted the court's decision.

On January 9, 2003, a formal hearing was held to determine the legal status of the Dallas ISD. Some members of the public said that the desegregation, while a good thing, did more harm than good and as a result of the white flight that occurred in the late 1970s and early 1980s the school district had swung from predominantly white to predominantly minority. Sanders offered no answer to any of the public questions but concluded the session by taking all comments into advisement.

Decades of oversight finally came to an end in June 2003, when Sanders ruled that Dallas ISD was no longer subject to his oversight and was desegregated.

During the summer of 2009, Sanders was honored by the Dallas ISD when the Board of Trustees renamed the School of Government, Law, & Law Enforcement to Judge Barefoot Sanders Law Magnet.

== Personal life ==
Sanders was married to the former Jan Scurlock. He and his wife had four children. She was an activist for SANE/FREEZE (now Peace Action).

His oldest daughter, Janet, is a judge on the Massachusetts Superior Court. His son, Harold III, is a musician, composer, and owner of Barefoot Music whose best-known work is the theme to the reality TV competition series Top Chef.

== See also ==
- Lyndon B. Johnson judicial appointment controversies

Political offices
Vacant Title next held by Larry O'Brien; 1965	White House Director of Legislative Affairs; 1967–1969	Succeeded by Bryce Harlow
Party political offices
Preceded by Waggoner Carr	Democratic nominee for U.S. Senator from Texas (Class 2); 1972	Succeeded by Bob Krueger
Legal offices
New seat	Judge of the United States District Court for the Northern District of Texas; 1979–1996	Succeeded by Barbara M. Lynn
Preceded by Robert William Porter	Chief Judge of the United States District Court for the Northern District of Texas; 1989–1995	Succeeded by Jerry Buchmeyer
