= Courtney Coker =

American attorney (born 1976)

Courtney Leigh Coker

Judge of the United States District Court for the Northern District of Texas
- Designate
- Assuming office TBD
- Appointed by: Donald Trump
- Succeeding: David C. Godbey

Personal details
- Born: Courtney Leigh Coker; 1976 (age 49–50) Bowling Green, Kentucky
- Education: Centre College (B.A.); Mississippi College (J.D.)
- Awards: Kentucky Colonel

Courtney Leigh Coker (born 1976) is an American attorney currently serving as an Assistant United States Attorney for the Northern District of Texas. He is a designate to serve as a judge on the United States District Court for the Northern District of Texas.

== Education ==
Born in 1976 in Bowling Green, Kentucky, Coker received a Bachelor of Arts degree in 1999 from Centre College and a Juris Doctor in 2002 from the Mississippi College School of Law (now the Mississippi Christian University School of Law). He was a law clerk at the Baxley Law Firm, PLLC from 2000 to 2001 and a law clerk at the law firm of Derek L. Hall, Attorney at Law from 2001 to 2002. He was appointed a Kentucky Colonel in 1999.

== Career ==
Coker has served in the United States Attorney's Office for the Northern District of Texas since 2020, as Deputy Criminal Chief from 2020 to 2021, as an Assistant United States Attorney from 2021 to 2025 and as First Assistant United States Attorney since 2025. He served as Criminal Chief in the United States Attorney's Office for the Southern District of Mississippi from 2017 to 2019. He served as an Assistant United States Attorney in the United States Attorney's Office for the Middle District of Tennessee from 2016 to 2017. He served as an Assistant United States Attorney in the United States Attorney's Office for the Southern District of Florida from 2011 to 2016. He served as an Assistant United States Attorney in the United States Attorney's Office for the District of Puerto Rico from 2008 to 2011. He was an Adjunct Professor of Trial Practice at the Mississippi College of Law for the January 2007 term. He was a Partner at Coker and Cole, PLLC from 2005 to 2007. He was a Partner at Banks, Coker and Cole, PLLC from 2004 to 2005. He was an Associate Attorney at the law firm of John M. Colette and Associates from 2002 to 2004.

=== Nomination to district court ===
On August 18, 2026, President Donald Trump announced his intention to nominate Coker to an undesignated seat on the United States District Court for the Northern District of Texas. On November 10, 2026, the Senate Judiciary Committee reported his nomination to the full Senate on a 12–10 party line vote. The U.S. Senate confirmed his nomination by a vote of 49–41 on November 20, 2026.

== Personal ==
Coker resides in Flower Mound, Texas.

Legal offices
Preceded by David C. Godbey	Judge of the United States District Court for the Northern District of Texas; Taking office 2026	Designate
