= Jerry Buchmeyer =

American judge

Jerry L. Buchmeyer
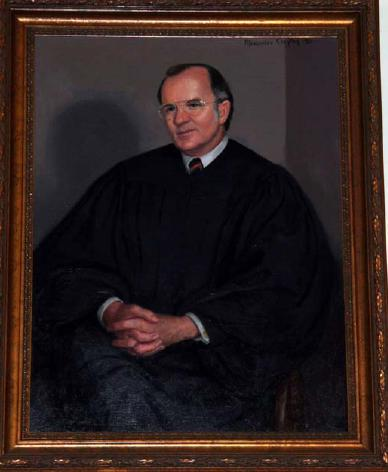

Senior Judge of the United States District Court for the Northern District of Texas
- In office September 5, 2003 – September 21, 2009

Chief Judge of the United States District Court for the Northern District of Texas
- In office 1995–2001
- Preceded by: Barefoot Sanders
- Succeeded by: A. Joe Fish

Judge of the United States District Court for the Northern District of Texas
- In office October 5, 1979 – September 5, 2003
- Appointed by: Jimmy Carter
- Preceded by: William McLaughlin Taylor Jr.
- Succeeded by: Jane J. Boyle

Personal details
- Born: Jerry Lynn Buchmeyer; September 5, 1933 Overton, Texas, U.S.
- Died: September 21, 2009 (aged 76) San Marcos, Texas, U.S.
- Education: Kilgore College (AA); University of Texas at Austin (BA, LLB)

Jerry Lynn Buchmeyer (September 5, 1933 – September 21, 2009) was an American lawyer and jurist who served as a United States district judge of the United States District Court for the Northern District of Texas in Dallas, Texas.

== Early life and education ==
Born in Overton, Texas, on September 5, 1933, Buchmeyer received an Associate of Arts degree from Kilgore Junior College (now Kilgore College) in 1953, his Bachelor of Arts degree from the University of Texas at Austin in 1956, and his Bachelor of Laws from the University of Texas School of Law in 1957.

== Career ==
From 1958 to 1979, Buchmeyer worked in private law practice in Dallas at the law firm of Thompson & Knight.

=== Federal judicial service ===
Buchmeyer was nominated by President Jimmy Carter on August 3, 1979, to a seat on the United States District Court for the Northern District of Texas vacated by Judge William McLaughlin Taylor Jr. He was confirmed by the United States Senate on October 4, 1979, and received his commission on October 5, 1979. He served as chief judge from 1995 to 2001. He assumed senior status on September 5, 2003. His service terminated on September 21, 2009, due to his death in San Marcos, Texas.

Legal offices
Preceded by William McLaughlin Taylor Jr.	Judge of the United States District Court for the Northern District of Texas; 1979–2003	Succeeded by Jane J. Boyle
Preceded by Barefoot Sanders	Chief Judge of the United States District Court for the Northern District of Texas; 1995–2001	Succeeded by A. Joe Fish
