= Samuel Ray Cummings =

American judge (born 1944)

Senior Judge of the United States District Court for the Northern District of Texas
- Incumbent
- Assumed office December 31, 2014

Judge of the United States District Court for the Northern District of Texas
- In office December 9, 1987 – December 31, 2014
- Appointed by: Ronald Reagan
- Preceded by: Halbert Owen Woodward
- Succeeded by: James Wesley Hendrix

Personal details
- Born: Samuel Ray Commings; October 18, 1944 (age 81) Lubbock, Texas, U.S.
- Education: Texas Tech University (BBA); Baylor University (JD)

Samuel Ray Cummings (born October 18, 1944) is a senior United States district judge of the United States District Court for the Northern District of Texas.

== Education and career ==
Cummings was born in Lubbock, Texas. He received a Bachelor of Business Administration from Texas Tech University in 1967 and a Juris Doctor from Baylor Law School in 1970. He was in private practice in Amarillo, Texas from 1970 to 1987.

=== Federal judicial service ===
On July 31, 1987, Cummings was nominated by President Ronald Reagan to a seat on the United States District Court for the Northern District of Texas vacated by Judge Halbert Owen Woodward. Cummings was confirmed by the United States Senate on December 8, 1987, and received his commission on December 9, 1987. He assumed senior status on December 31, 2014.

=== Notable cases ===
On November 16, 2016, Cummings issued a permanent nationwide injunction blocking President Barack Obama's "persuader rule", finding, that its attempt to require an employer's attorney to publicly disclose advise provided to persuade against unionization violated the First Amendment to the United States Constitution.

== Sources ==
Legal offices
Preceded by Halbert Owen Woodward	Judge of the United States District Court for the Northern District of Texas; 1987–2014	Succeeded by James Wesley Hendrix
