= Eldon Brooks Mahon =

American judge (1918–2005)

Senior Judge of the United States District Court for the Northern District of Texas
- In office October 1, 1989 – December 3, 2005

Judge of the United States District Court for the Northern District of Texas
- In office July 3, 1972 – October 1, 1989
- Appointed by: Richard Nixon
- Preceded by: Joe Ewing Estes
- Succeeded by: John H. McBryde

Personal details
- Born: Eldon Brooks Mahon; April 9, 1918 Loraine, Texas, U.S.
- Died: December 3, 2005 (aged 87) Fort Worth, Texas, U.S.
- Education: McMurry University (B.A.); University of Texas School of Law (LL.B.)

Eldon Brooks Mahon (April 9, 1918 – December 3, 2005) was a United States district judge of the United States District Court for the Northern District of Texas.

== Education and career ==
Born in Loraine, Texas, Mahon received a Bachelor of Arts degree from McMurry University in 1939 and a Bachelor of Laws from the University of Texas School of Law in 1942.

He was in the United States Army Air Corps from August 1942 to November 1945 and became a captain. He was a law clerk for Justice J. E. Hickman of the Texas Supreme Court from 1945 to 1946. He was county attorney of Mitchell County, Texas in 1947. He was state district attorney of the Texas 32nd Judicial District from 1948 to 1960. He was a judge of the Texas State District Court for the 32nd Judicial District from 1961 to 1963. He was vice president of the Texas Electric Service Company (TESCO) from 1963 to 1964. He was in private practice in Abilene, Texas from 1964 to 1968. He was the United States Attorney for the Northern District of Texas from 1968 to 1972.

== Federal judicial service ==
Mahon was nominated by President Richard Nixon on June 23, 1972, to a seat on the United States District Court for the Northern District of Texas vacated by Judge Joe Ewing Estes. He was confirmed by the United States Senate on June 28, 1972, and received his commission on July 3, 1972. He assumed senior status on October 1, 1989. Mahon served in that capacity until his death on December 3, 2005, in Fort Worth, Texas.

== Sources ==
Legal offices
| Preceded by Joe Ewing Estes | Judge of the United States District Court for the Northern District of Texas; 1972–1989 | Succeeded by John H. McBryde |
