= Sarah T. Hughes =

American jurist (1896–1985)

Sarah Hughes
- Hughes in 1972

Senior Judge of the United States District Court for the Northern District of Texas
- In office August 4, 1975 – April 23, 1985

Judge of the United States District Court for the Northern District of Texas
- In office October 5, 1961 – August 4, 1975
- Appointed by: John F. Kennedy
- Preceded by: Seat established
- Succeeded by: Patrick Higginbotham

Personal details
- Born: Sarah Augusta Tilghman; August 2, 1896 Baltimore, Maryland, U.S.
- Died: April 23, 1985 (aged 88) Dallas, Texas, U.S.
- Party: Democratic
- Spouse: George E. Hughes (m. 1922; died 1964)
- Education: Goucher College (BA); George Washington University (LLB)

Sarah Tilghman Hughes (born Sarah Augusta Tilghman; August 2, 1896 – April 23, 1985) was an American lawyer and federal judge who served on the United States District Court for the Northern District of Texas. She is best known as the judge who swore in Lyndon B. Johnson as President of the United States on Air Force One after President John F. Kennedy was assassinated in Dallas on November 22, 1963. She is the only woman to have sworn in a US president. The photo depicting Hughes administering the oath of office to Johnson is widely viewed as the most famous photo ever taken aboard Air Force One.

== Early life, family and education ==
Born Sarah Augusta Tilghman in Baltimore, Maryland, she was the daughter of Elizabeth (née Haughton) and James Cooke Tilghman. She went to high school at Western Female High School (now Western High School) in Baltimore, where she was elected president of the freshman class. Standing only five feet one-half inch at maturity, she was described by a classmate as "small but terrible". Her determined personality extended to the athletic field where she participated in intramural track and field, gymnastics, and basketball. Her strong personal discipline was seen in her habit of going to bed by 8 pm and getting up at 4 am, a habit she continued through much of her life. After graduating from Western High School, she attended Goucher College, a then-all-women's college in central Baltimore near home. She participated in athletics at Goucher and graduated with a Bachelor of Arts degree in 1917.

Two years later, she moved to Washington, D.C. and attended night classes at The George Washington University Law School. She graduated with a Bachelor of Laws in 1922.

== Career ==
After college, Hughes taught science at Salem Academy in Winston-Salem, North Carolina, for two years. After her move to Washington, D.C. and enrollment in night classes at The George Washington University Law School, she worked as a police officer during the day. As a police officer, Hughes did not carry a gun or wear a police uniform because she worked to prevent crimes among women and girls, patrolling areas where female runaways and prostitutes were normally found. Her job was an expression of the progressive idea of rehabilitation instead of punishment. Hughes later credited this job with instilling in her a sense of commitment and responsibility to women and children. At that time she lived in a tent home near the Potomac River and commuted to the campus by canoe each evening.

In 1922, she moved to Dallas, Texas, with her husband George Ernest Hughes, whom she had met at law school. He quickly found employment, but Sarah faced significant obstacles as a woman during a time in which law firms generally did not regard women as qualified. Eventually, Priest, Herndon, and Ledbetter, a small law firm, gave her a rent-free space and even referred some cases to her in exchange for her services as a receptionist.

As her practice grew, she became increasingly active in local women's organizations. She joined the Zonta Club, the Business and Professional Women's Club, the Dallas Women's Political League, the League of Women Voters, YWCA, Dallas College Club, and the American Association of University Women. Hughes served as Chair of the AAUW Committee on the Economic and Legal Status of Women, advocating equal pay jury service for women, and improved status and recognition for women in the Armed Services.

She practiced law for eight years in Dallas before becoming involved in politics, first being elected in 1930 to three terms in the Texas House of Representatives as a Democrat. In 1935, Hughes accepted an appointment as a state judge from Governor James Burr V. Allred for the Fourteenth District Court in Dallas, becoming the state's first female district judge. In 1936, she was elected to the same post. She was re-elected six more times and remained in that post until 1961.

== Federal judicial service ==
Hughes received a recess appointment from President John F. Kennedy on October 5, 1961, to the United States District Court for the Northern District of Texas, to a new seat authorized by 75 Stat. 80. She was nominated to the same position by President Kennedy on January 15, 1962. She was confirmed by the United States Senate on March 16, 1962, and received her commission on March 17, 1962. She was the only female judge appointed by President Kennedy, the first female federal judge in Texas and the third female to serve in the federal judiciary. She assumed senior status on August 4, 1975. Her service terminated with her death on April 23, 1985.

=== Circumstances of appointment ===
The appointment almost did not happen, according to the historian Robert Caro, because the Kennedy administration thought that Hughes was "too old" and they were seeking younger jurists for the lifetime tenure afforded under Article III for federal judgeships. Hughes had been a "longtime Johnson ally", and as vice president, Johnson had asked Robert F. Kennedy, the attorney general of the United States and brother of President John F. Kennedy, "to nominate Mrs. Hughes" for the Federal bench, but the United States Justice Department turned him down. Johnson then offered the job to another attorney. However, Hughes was also an ally of the speaker of the House, Sam Rayburn, who held up a bill important to Robert Kennedy until Hughes' appointment was announced. Johnson was outraged at the chain of events because it appeared to be an intentional attempt to insult him, and made him look like the "biggest liar and fool in the history of the State of Texas". President Kennedy's White House appointments secretary called it a "terrible mistake", citing negligence on the part of Kennedy's staff. The story of how Hughes received her appointment made the rounds of Washington, D.C. insiders, including the political gossip columnists Evans and Novak, which hurt Johnson's reputation for political effectiveness. Historian Steven Gillon agrees with Caro's story, although it was not cross-cited.

== Women on juries ==
Hughes was concerned over the ineligibility of women in Texas to serve on juries even though they had the right to vote. She and Helen Edmunds Moore coauthored a proposed amendment that would allow women on juries in Texas, but the bill failed and went nowhere. Despite defeat, Hughes became closely identified with this cause and few people were recognized as working harder for this right. Due in part to Hughes's work, Texas women secured the right to serve on juries in 1954.

== Administering the oath of office ==
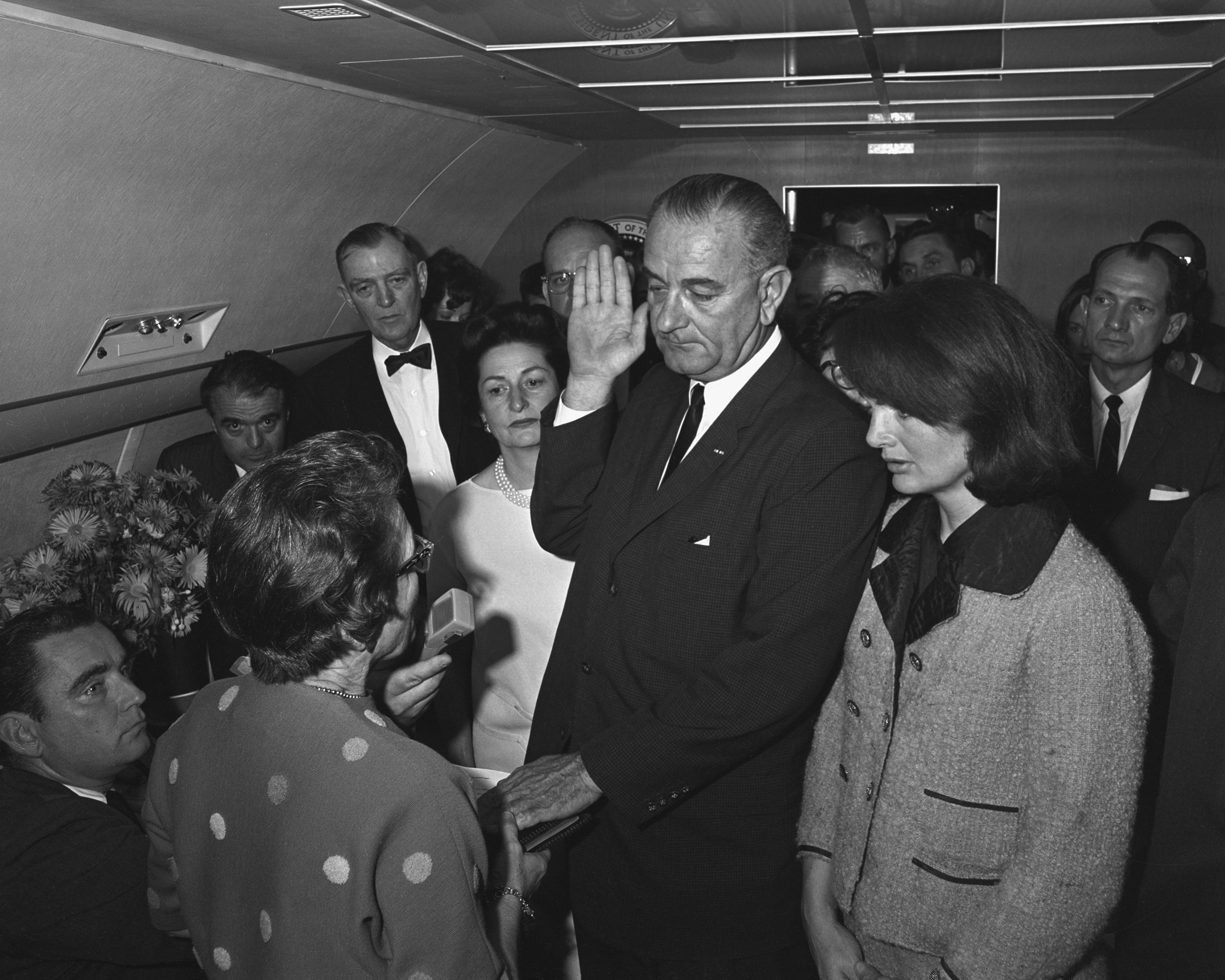
Judge Hughes swears in Lyndon B. Johnson as President of the United States as Jacqueline Kennedy (still wearing her blood-stained pink chanel suit) and Lady Bird Johnson look on. Photo by Cecil W. Stoughton.

Two years into her tenure as a federal district judge, on November 22, 1963, Hughes was called upon to administer the oath of office to Lyndon B. Johnson after the assassination of President Kennedy, a task usually performed by the Chief Justice of the United States. According to an interview with Barefoot Sanders, who was United States Attorney for the Northern District of Texas at the time:

LBJ called Irving Goldberg from the plane and asked, 'Who can swear me in?' Goldberg called me, and I said, 'Well, we know a federal judge can.' Then I got a call from the President's plane, with the command 'Find Sarah Hughes.' Coincidentally, Judge Hughes, Jan [Sanders' wife] and I [Sanders] were supposed to go to Austin that night for a dinner for President Kennedy. I reached her at home and said, 'They need you to swear in the Vice President at Love Field. Please get out there.'

She said, 'Is there an oath?'

I said, 'Yes, but we haven't found it yet.'

She said, 'Don't worry about it; I'll make one up.'

She was very resourceful, you know. By the time she got to the airplane, someone had already called it into the plane. We quickly realized that it is in the Constitution [Art. II, Sec. 1, cl. 8].

Because of this, Hughes was the most suitable choice. Sanders and Hughes no doubt believed those rationales, but Johnson had other reasons to choose her, according to Caro: "He knew who he wanted - and she was in Dallas". Citing another historian, Max Holland, Caro noted that the circumstances surrounding Hughes's appointment meant that she "'personified Johnson's utter powerlessness'" when he was vice president. The new president ordered his staff, "'Get Sarah Hughes ... Find her.'"

Hughes was found and driven to Love Field, while Air Force One—and thus the inauguration of the new president—was held up just for her. Caro asserts that Johnson, in his insecurities, chose Hughes to show to the world that he was now powerful. Two other historians (Holland and Gillen) agree with Caro's assessment that Johnson was still upset that he'd not been consulted on Hughes's appointment in the first place, so it was a way to placate his ego. On the other hand, Johnson needed to make sure that "the swearing-in take place at the earliest possible moment ... to demonstrate, quickly, continuity and stability to the nation and the world. ... " Johnson used the "few minutes to spare" while waiting for Hughes to arrive to plead to Kennedy's staffers to stay awhile for the transition. Finally, she arrived, along with the media and Jackie Kennedy; only then the swearing-in could take place. Hughes noted that Jackie's "eyes 'were cast down'" when Johnson nodded to the judge to start the oath of office.

== Other significant contributions ==
Hughes was involved in multiple court decisions, including Roe v. Wade, Shultz v. Brookhaven General Hospital, and Taylor v. Sterrett. Hughes was a member of the three-judge panel that first heard the case of Roe v. Wade; the panel's decision was subsequently affirmed by the Supreme Court of the United States. In Taylor v. Sterrett, she argued to upgrade prisoner treatment in the Dallas County jail. Hughes noted that "the Dallas County Jail was very much in need of change. It was in deplorable condition, and [she] think[s], that under [her] jurisdiction, it became one of the best jails in the whole United States".

== Later years ==
She retired from the active federal bench in 1975, though she continued to work as a judge with senior status until 1982. A close friend of Lyndon Johnson and his family, Hughes participated in his inauguration in 1965, took part in the book signing of Lady Bird Johnson's White House memoirs, and participated in the dedication of the Lyndon Baines Johnson Library and Museum.

== Legacy ==
The Sarah T. Hughes Field Politics Center at Hughes' alma mater, Goucher College, was founded in the 1950s with a grant from the Maurice and Laura Falk Foundation. The special collections reading room of the University of North Texas Libraries is also named in her honor.

The dress Hughes wore when swearing in Lyndon Johnson on Air Force One was donated to a wax museum in Grand Prairie, Texas, but it was destroyed in a fire in 1988.

== Personal life and death ==
At law school, she met George Ernest Hughes, and they married March 13, 1922, the same year she received her law degree. Hughes and her husband were Episcopalians. They had no children. George died on June 1, 1964.

In 1982, Hughes suffered a debilitating stroke which confined her to a nursing home in Dallas. She died three years later on April 23, 1985.

== Bibliography ==
- La Forte, Robert S. "Hughes, Sarah Tilghman." Handbook of Texas Online. Accessed December 1, 2013.
- La Forte, Robert S. and Richard Himmel. "Sarah T. Hughes, John F. Kennedy, and the Johnson Inaugural, 1963." East Texas Historical Journal 27, no. 2 (1989): 35–41.
- Payne, Darwin. Indomitable Sarah: The Life of Judge Sarah T. Hughes. Dallas: Southern Methodist University Press, 2004.
- Riddlesperger, James W. "Sarah T. Hughes." Master's thesis, North Texas State University, 1980.

== See also ==
- List of first women lawyers and judges in Texas

Legal offices
New seat	Judge of the United States District Court for the Northern District of Texas; 1961–1975	Succeeded by Patrick Higginbotham
