= 1922 Texas gubernatorial election =

- November 7, 1922
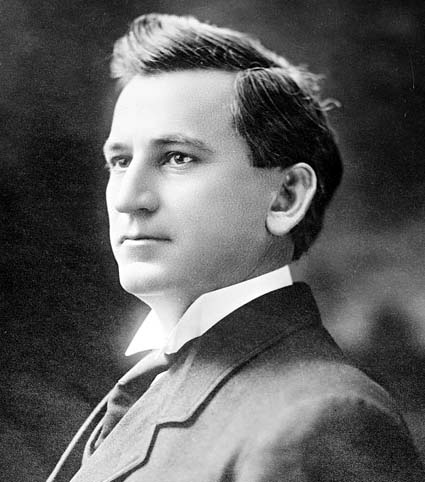

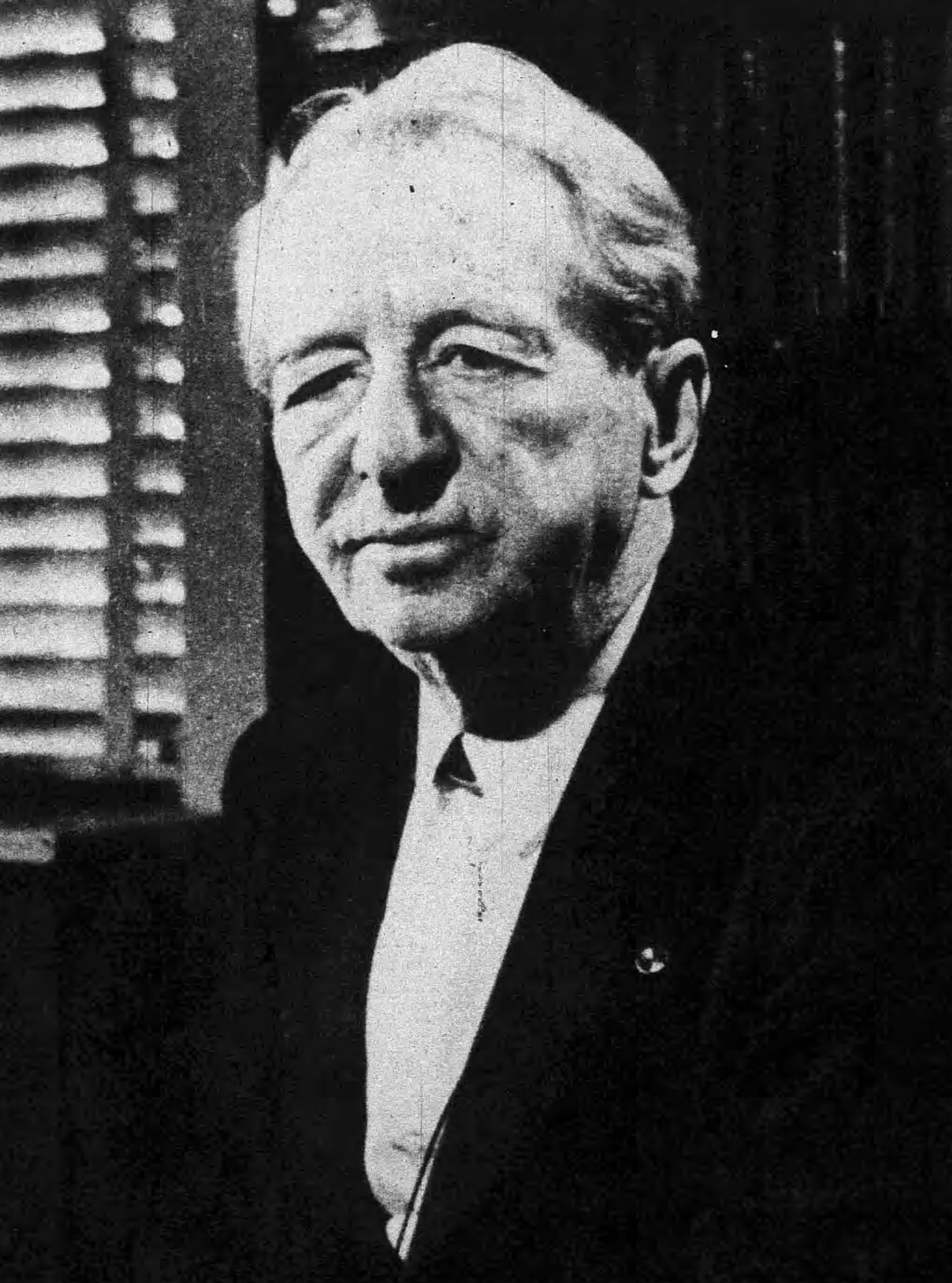
Nominee	Pat Morris Neff	William Hawley Atwell
Party	Democratic	Republican
Popular vote	334,199	73,327
Percentage	82.01%	17.99%
- County results Neff: 50–60% 60–70% 70–80% 80–90% >90% Atwell: 50–60% 60–70% 70–80% 80–90% No vote
Governor before election
Pat Morris Neff
Democratic
Elected Governor
Pat Morris Neff
Democratic

The 1922 Texas gubernatorial election was held on November 7, 1922 in order to elect the Governor of Texas. Incumbent Democratic Governor Pat Morris Neff won re-election to a second term, defeating Republican candidate William Hawley Atwell in a landslide.

== Democratic primary ==
Governor Neff won in the Democratic party primary against three different challengers relatively comfortably, and narrowly avoided a runoff.

=== Results ===
Democratic primary results
Party	Candidate	Votes	%
Democratic	Patrick Morris Neff (incumbent)	318,000	53.90
Democratic	Fred S. Rogers	195,941	33.21
Democratic	Harry T. Warner	57,671	9.78
Democratic	W. W. "Cap" King	18,368	3.11
Total votes		589,980	100.00

== General election ==
On election day, 7 November 1922, Democratic nominee and incumbent Governor Pat Morris Neff won the election by a margin of 260,872 votes against his opponent Republican nominee William Hawley Atwell, thereby retaining Democratic control over the office of Governor. He was sworn in for his second term on January 20, 1923.

=== Results ===
Texas gubernatorial election, 1922
Party	Candidate	Votes	%
Democratic	Pat Morris Neff (incumbent)	334,199	82.01
Republican	William Hawley Atwell	73,327	17.99
Total votes		407,526	100.00
Democratic hold			
