= Reed O'Connor =

American judge (born 1965)

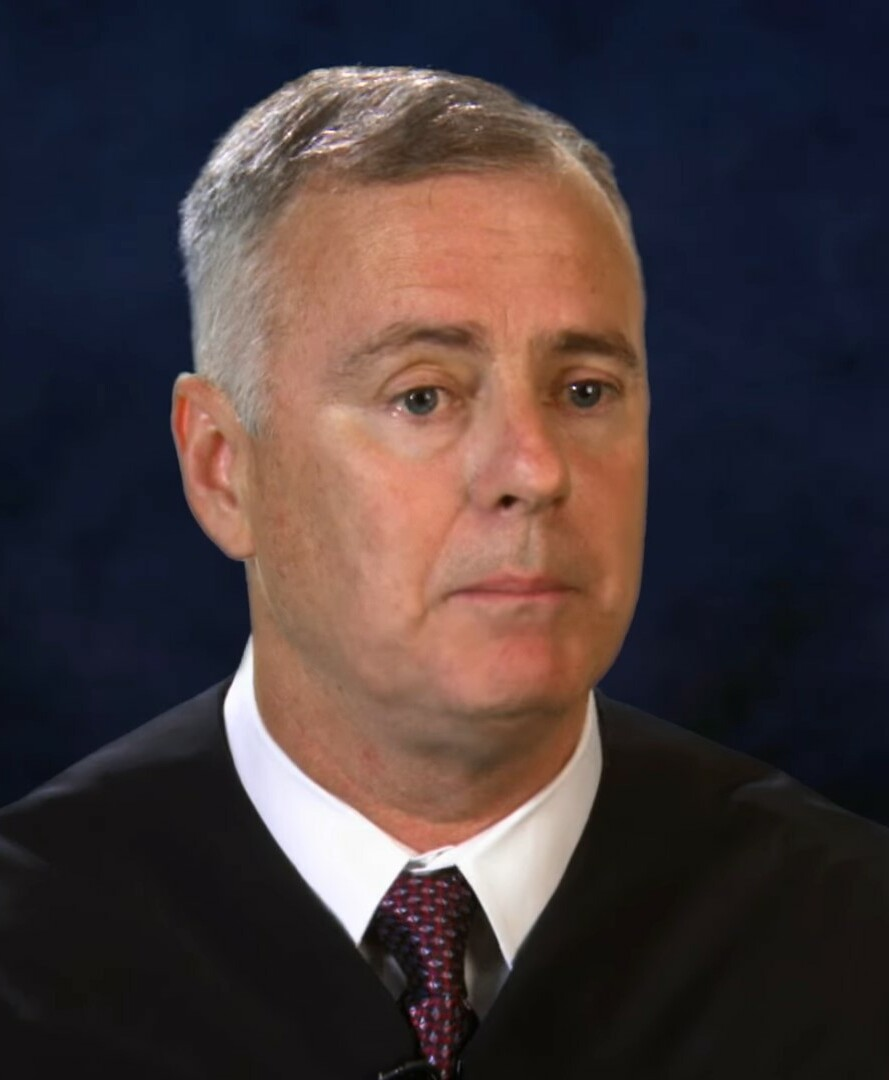
- O'Connor in 2018

Chief Judge of the United States District Court for the Northern District of Texas
- Incumbent
- Assumed office August 18, 2025
- Preceded by: David C. Godbey

Judge of the United States District Court for the Northern District of Texas
- Incumbent
- Assumed office November 21, 2007
- Appointed by: George W. Bush
- Preceded by: A. Joe Fish

Personal details
- Born: Reed Charles O'Connor; 1965 (age 60–61) Houston, Texas, U.S.
- Party: Republican
- Education: University of Houston (BS); South Texas College of Law (JD)

Reed Charles O'Connor (born 1965) is a chief United States district judge of the United States District Court for the Northern District of Texas. He was nominated by President George W. Bush in 2007.

Critics claim that O'Connor has become a "go-to" favorite for conservative lawyers, as he reliably rules against Democratic policies and for Republican policies. Attorneys General in Texas appear to strategically file cases in O'Connor's jurisdiction so that he will hear them.

== Early life and career ==
Born in Houston to George John O'Connor and Eileen Star Boyle, O'Connor received a Bachelor of Science degree from the University of Houston in 1986 and a Juris Doctor from South Texas College of Law in 1989. He was in private practice in Texas from 1989 to 1994 and an assistant district attorney with the Tarrant County District Attorney's Office in Fort Worth, Texas from 1994 to 1998. O'Connor then served as Assistant United States Attorney of the Northern District of Texas from 1998 to 2007. From 2003 to 2007, he worked on the staff of the United States Senate Committee on the Judiciary. and served as chief counsel to U.S. Senator John Cornyn from 2005 to 2007.

=== Federal judicial service ===
On June 27, 2007, O'Connor was nominated by President George W. Bush to a seat on the United States District Court for the Northern District of Texas vacated by A. Joe Fish. The United States Senate confirmed O'Connor's appointment on November 16, 2007, and he received his commission on November 21, 2007. He became the chief judge on August 18, 2025.

=== Significant cases ===
O'Connor has widely been described as conservative, and many of his rulings have been reversed on appeal. He has long been active in the Federalist Society, and is a contributor who has frequently spoken at the organization's events in Texas. According to his critics, O'Connor has become a "go-to" favorite for conservative lawyers, because, they claim, he reliably rules against Democratic policies and for Republican policies. Attorneys General in Texas appear to strategically file cases in O'Connor's jurisdiction so that he will hear them.

On February 11, 2015, O'Connor held that a portion of the federal Gun Control Act of 1968 was unconstitutional. This ruling was reversed on appeal.

On March 26, 2015, O'Connor enjoined the federal government's definition of marriage as it relates to the Family and Medical Leave Act of 1993. He dissolved the injunction following the Supreme Court's decision in Obergefell v. Hodges.

On August 21, 2016, O'Connor issued a ruling against the Obama administration dealing with the government's interpretation of Title IX rules. The guidance from the White House was issued in May 2016, and addresses the Title IX requirement that schools receiving federal funding not discriminate against students on the basis of sex. The guidance required that transgender students be allowed to use the bathroom that corresponds to their gender identity. O'Connor ruled that the new guidelines did not receive proper notice and comment prior to publication, and that Title IX and its implementing regulation are "not ambiguous" as to the "plain meaning of the term sex as used". He then issued a nationwide injunction preventing them from being enforced with respect to students' access to "intimate facilities." The Obama administration appealed the decision, but the Trump administration rescinded the guidance and moved to dismiss the appeal.

On December 31, 2016, in a separate case, O'Connor issued a preliminary injunction against enforcement of the Obama administration's regulations implementing Section 1557 of the Affordable Care Act (prohibiting sex discrimination in federally funded health programs) as a likely violation of the Religious Freedom Restoration Act and what he said was an improper inclusion of gender identity discrimination.

In early 2018, O'Connor held the Certification Rule of the Affordable Care Act unconstitutional in Texas v. Commissioner of Internal Revenue, concluding that it violated the nondelegation doctrine. This ruling was reversed on appeal.

In 2018, O'Connor ruled that the Indian Child Welfare Act was unconstitutional. The Fifth Circuit reversed O'Connor's ruling on appeal, and the reversal was upheld by the Supreme Court in Haaland v. Brackeen (2023).

On October 31, 2021, O'Connor ruled that the First Amendment and the Religious Freedom Restoration Act provide religious employers an exemption from Title VII of the Civil Rights Act's ban on discrimination "on the basis of...sex".

In 2022, O'Connor issued a preliminary injunction blocking the Pentagon from enforcing a COVID-19 vaccine requirement for its Navy Seals. O'Connor said the U.S. government had "no license" to abrogate the freedoms of the Navy SEALs. The preliminary injunction was partially stayed by the Supreme Court on March 25, 2022.

In October 2022, O'Connor ruled that the Boeing Company committed criminal acts when not disclosing the MCAS system of the FAA. This contradicted the previous settlement the federal government made with Boeing, and opened the door for new legal action by victims families.

In VanDerStok v. Garland (2023), O'Connor issued a nationwide injunction blocking a rule issued in 2022 by the ATF that classified receiver blanks as "firearms" or firearm "frames or receivers" within the meaning of the Gun Control Act. By classifying receiver blanks as firearms, the ATF rule required such receiver blanks to have serial numbers, required manufacturers of such receiver blanks to be licensed, and required commercial sellers to conduct background checks for purchasers. O'Connor determined that the ATF rule exceeded the agency's authority, ruling that receiver blanks were not firearms or firearm receivers. The U.S. appealed to the Fifth Circuit, and O'Connor's injunction was administratively stayed by the U.S. Supreme Court pending further proceedings. The Supreme Court later reversed O'Connor's opinion in Bondi v. VanDerStok, in an opinion written by Trump appointee Neil Gorsuch. On remand, in Defense Distributed v. Blanche (2026), O'Connor ruled for the remaining plaintiffs on their constitutional claims.

In an act criticized as an example of forum shopping, Elon Musk's website X (Twitter) filed two lawsuits in O'Connor's court division although neither it nor the defendants are located in Texas. Judge O'Connor drew additional scrutiny after published reports revealed that he owned stock in Tesla, another company run by Musk. On August 13, 2024, Judge O'Connor recused himself from one of those cases — the lawsuit against the World Federation of Advertisers.

In May 2026, while the Department of Justice prosecutors were still in talks with Rhode Island Hospital for access to medical records of juveniles who sought treatment for gender dysphoria, the DOJ filed an enforcement action before O'Connor's court in Texas. The DOJ then attempted to seek enforcement of the order, but was denied by Rhode Island's Judge Mary McElroy on May 14, who concluded O'Connor's subpoena "lacks a congressionally authorized purpose" and was issued "for an improper purpose in bad faith." On May 18, O'Connor then issued an injunction "claiming to prohibit the hospital from seeking relief in the federal courts that oversee Rhode Island under threat of contempt" and forced the hospital to turn over the records. The injunction had been characterized as an "abuse of power" and was largely successful as the First Circuit refused to hear a request from the hospital to issue an order to allow the hospital not to hand over the records to anyone.

In June 2026, O'Connor joined Judge Mark T. Pittman in giving sentences totaling 450 years to nine defendants in the 2025 Prairieland ICE detention center incident, which were described as "stunningly severe." According to the defendants' committee, O'Connor stated in his sentencing that "the state wants to send a message to anyone who shares a similar ideology" (i.e. anti-fascism).

On June 22, 2026, Texas Attorney General Ken Paxton and America First Legal filed Texas v. Department of Justice in the Wichita Falls Division, challenging the administrative closure rule, a Justice Department rule related to immigration removal proceedings. Hours later, Texas and the second Trump administration asked the court to vacate the rule and to prevent the rule from being enacted in the future. The same day, O'Connor granted the parties motion for a consent judgment. In October 2026, represented by Democracy Forward, Democratic-led cities filed Baltimore v. Texas, asking the Supreme Court to stay O'Connor's judgement after O'Connor denied the cities' motion to intervene. The cities said there was the "the absence of a genuine controversy". The Supreme Court denied the stay.

=== Affordable Care Act ===
On December 14, 2018, O'Connor ruled that the Affordable Care Act was unconstitutional. O'Connor ruled that the individual mandate was unconstitutional by saying "[the] Individual Mandate can no longer be fairly read as an exercise of Congress's Tax Power and is still impermissible under the Interstate Commerce Clause—meaning the Individual Mandate is unconstitutional." This is in reference to National Federation of Independent Business v. Sebelius (2012) which ruled that the individual mandate was constitutional because of the tax penalty. The penalty was reduced to $0 by the 2017 tax bill starting in 2019. The ruling was deemed likely to be appealed, with both Republican and Democratic legal experts saying that the legal challenge to the Affordable Care Act was unlikely to succeed. The Affordable Care Act would remain in effect throughout the appeals process. President Donald Trump commended the ruling on Twitter.

Legal experts who both support and oppose the Affordable Care Act harshly criticized O'Connor's ruling, with The Washington Post noting that legal scholars considered O'Connor's ruling "as a tortured effort to rewrite not just the law but congressional history." Ted Frank, director of litigation at the conservative Competitive Enterprise Institute said the ruling was "embarrassingly bad." Nicholas Bagley said O'Connor's ruling was "about as naked a piece of judicial activism as I have ever seen; I don't even think it's close." Jonathan H. Adler and Abbe R. Gluck, who were on opposing sides of the 2012 and 2015 Supreme Court challenges to the Affordable Care Act, wrote a joint opinion editorial in The New York Times where they described the ruling as "lawless", "a mockery of the rule of law and basic principles of democracy" and "an exercise of raw judicial power."

While O'Connor's ruling was upheld on appeal to the United States Court of Appeals for the Fifth Circuit, O'Connor and the Fifth Circuit were reversed by the Supreme Court of the United States in a 7-2 ruling issued on June 17, 2021, which stated that the parties involved in the lawsuit did not have standing to bring the suit. Associate Justice Stephen Breyer was joined in the majority by Chief Justice John Roberts and Associate Justices Clarence Thomas, Sonia Sotomayor, Elena Kagan, Brett Kavanaugh, and Amy Coney Barrett. Thomas wrote a concurring opinion while Associate Justice Samuel Alito wrote a dissenting opinion and was joined by Associate Justice Neil Gorsuch.

In Kennedy v. Braidwood Management, Inc., on March 30, 2023, O'Connor sided with a group of employers and individuals in Texas who argued that the Affordable Care Act's provision mandating that businesses provide their employees with free coverage of preventative services including mammograms, colonoscopies, mental health screenings, and the HIV prevention drug PrEP was unconstitutional. Coverage recommendations are driven by the volunteer U.S. Preventive Services Task Force; O'Connor ruled that enforcing these recommendations was "unlawful" and violated the Appointments Clause of the U.S. Constitution. He also wrote that the coverage requirements violate employers' religious beliefs "by making them complicit in facilitating homosexual behavior, drug use, and sexual activity outside of marriage between one man and one woman." The Supreme Court later reversed his ruling in 2025.

Legal offices
Preceded by A. Joe Fish	Judge of the United States District Court for the Northern District of Texas; 2007–present	Incumbent
Preceded by David C. Godbey	Chief Judge of the United States District Court for the Northern District of Texas; 2025–present	Incumbent
