= United States District Court for the Northern District of Texas =

United States federal district court in Texas

Coordinates: 32°46′44″N 96°48′07″W

- (N.D. Tex.)
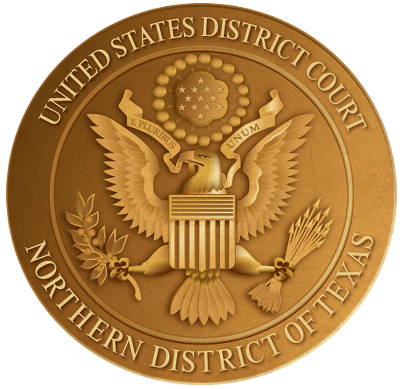
- Location: Earle Cabell Federal Building and Courthouse (Dallas) More locations: Eldon B. Mahon U.S. Courthouse (Fort Worth); Abilene; J. Marvin Jones Federal Building and U.S. Courthouse (Amarillo); Lubbock; San Angelo; Wichita Falls
- Appeals to: Fifth Circuit
- Established: February 24, 1879
- Judges: 12
- Chief Judge: Reed O'Connor

Officers of the court
- U.S. Attorney: Ryan Raybould
- www.txnd.uscourts.gov

The United States District Court for the Northern District of Texas (in case citations, N.D. Tex.) is a United States district court. Its first judge, Andrew Phelps McCormick, was appointed to the court on April 10, 1879. The court convenes in Dallas, Texas, with divisions in Fort Worth, Amarillo, Abilene, Lubbock, San Angelo, and Wichita Falls. It has jurisdiction over 100 counties in the northern and central parts of the U.S. state of Texas.

The United States Attorney's Office for the Northern District of Texas represents the United States in civil and criminal litigation in the court. The U.S. Attorney is Ryan Raybould, who was confirmed by the U.S. Senate in May 2026.

Appeals from this court are heard by the U.S. Court of Appeals for the Fifth Circuit, which includes Louisiana, Mississippi and Texas (except for patent claims and claims against the U.S. government under the Tucker Act, which are appealed to the Federal Circuit).

== Jurisdiction ==
The Northern District of Texas has seven court divisions, covering the following counties:

- The Abilene Division, covering Callahan, Eastland, Fisher, Haskell, Howard, Jones, Mitchell, Nolan, Shackelford, Stephens, Stonewall, Taylor, and Throckmorton counties.
- The Amarillo Division, covering Armstrong, Briscoe, Carson, Castro, Childress, Collingsworth, Dallam, Deaf Smith, Donley, Gray, Hall, Hansford, Hartley, Hemphill, Hutchinson, Lipscomb, Moore, Ochiltree, Oldham, Parmer, Potter, Randall, Roberts, Sherman, Swisher, and Wheeler counties.
- The Dallas Division, covering Dallas, Ellis, Hunt, Johnson, Kaufman, Navarro, and Rockwall counties.
- The Fort Worth Division, covering Comanche, Erath, Hood, Jack, Palo Pinto, Parker, Tarrant, and Wise counties.
- The Lubbock Division, covering Bailey, Borden, Cochran, Crosby, Dawson, Dickens, Floyd, Gaines, Garza, Hale, Hockley, Kent, Lamb, Lubbock, Lynn, Motley, Scurry, Terry, and Yoakum counties.
- The San Angelo Division, covering Brown, Coke, Coleman, Concho, Crockett, Glasscock, Irion, Menard, Mills, Reagan, Runnels, Schleicher, Sterling, Sutton, and Tom Green counties.
- The Wichita Falls Division, covering Archer, Baylor, Clay, Cottle, Foard, Hardeman, King, Knox, Montague, Wichita, Wilbarger, and Young counties.

== History ==
The first federal judge in Texas was John C. Watrous, who was appointed on May 26, 1846, and had previously served as Attorney General of the Republic of Texas. He was assigned to hold court in Galveston, at the time, the largest city in the state. As seat of the United States District Court for the District of Texas, the Galveston court had jurisdiction over the whole state. On February 21, 1857, the state was divided into two districts, Eastern and Western, with Judge Watrous continuing in the Eastern district. Judge Watrous and Judge Thomas Howard DuVal, of the Western District of Texas, left the state on the secession of Texas from the Union, the only two United States judges not to resign their posts in states that seceded. When Texas was restored to the Union, Watrous and DuVal resumed their duties and served until 1870.

In 1879, Texas was further subdivided with the creation of the United States District Court for the Northern District of Texas, using territory taken from both the Eastern and Western districts.

In the twenty-first century, the Northern District of Texas has become a destination for forum shopping by conservative judicial activists who hope to use the conservative lean of the judges to gain favorable ideological decisions.

== Current judges ==
As of November 20, 2026:

#	Title	Judge	Duty station	Born	Term of service			Appointed by
#	Title	Judge	Duty station	Born	Active	Chief	Senior	Appointed by
34	Chief Judge	Reed O'Connor	Fort Worth	1965	2007–present	2025–present	—	G.W. Bush
29	District Judge	Sam A. Lindsay	Dallas	1951	1998–present	—	—	Clinton
32	District Judge	James E. Kinkeade	Dallas	1951	2002–present	—	—	G.W. Bush
35	District Judge	Karen Gren Scholer	Dallas	1957	2018–present	—	—	Trump
36	District Judge	Matthew Kacsmaryk	Amarillo	1977	2019–present	—	—	Trump
37	District Judge	Mark T. Pittman	Fort Worth	1975	2019–present	—	—	Trump
38	District Judge	Brantley Starr	Dallas	1979	2019–present	—	—	Trump
39	District Judge	James Wesley Hendrix	Lubbock	1977	2019–present	—	—	Trump
40	District Judge	Ada Brown	Dallas	1974	2019–present	—	—	Trump
41	District Judge	Kasdin Mitchell	Dallas	1985	2026–present	—	—	Trump
42	District Judge	Courtney Coker	Dallas	1976	beg. 2026	—	—	Trump
43	District Judge	vacant	—	—	—	—	—	—
21	Senior Judge	A. Joe Fish	Dallas	1942	1983–2007	2002–2007	2007–present	Reagan
22	Senior Judge	Robert B. Maloney	inactive	1933	1985–2000	—	2000–present	Reagan
23	Senior Judge	Sidney A. Fitzwater	Dallas	1953	1986–2018	2007–2014	2018–present	Reagan
24	Senior Judge	Samuel Ray Cummings	Lubbock	1944	1987–2014	—	2014–present	Reagan
27	Senior Judge	Terry R. Means	Fort Worth	1948	1991–2013	—	2013–present	G.H.W. Bush
31	Senior Judge	David C. Godbey	Dallas	1957	2002–2025	2022–2025	2025–present	G.W. Bush
33	Senior Judge	Jane J. Boyle	Dallas	1954	2004–2025	—	2025–present	G.W. Bush

== Vacancies and pending nominations ==
Seat	Prior judge's duty station	Seat last held by	Vacancy reason	Date of vacancy	Nominee	Date of nomination
2	Dallas	Jane J. Boyle	Senior status	October 1, 2025	T. Elliot Gaiser	November 16, 2026

== Former judges ==
#	Judge	Born–died	Active service	Chief Judge	Senior status	Appointed by	Reason for termination
1	Andrew Phelps McCormick	1832–1916	1879–1892	—	—	Hayes	elevation
2	John B. Rector	1837–1898	1892–1898	—	—	B. Harrison	death
3	Edward Roscoe Meek	1865–1939	1899–1935	—	1935–1939	McKinley	death
4	James Clifton Wilson	1874–1951	1919–1951	—	—	Wilson	retirement
5	William Hawley Atwell	1869–1961	1923–1954	1948–1954	1954–1961	Harding	death
6	Thomas Whitfield Davidson	1876–1974	1936–1965	1954–1959	1965–1974	F. Roosevelt	death
7	Joseph Brannon Dooley	1889–1967	1947–1966	1959	1966–1967	Truman	death
8	Joe Ewing Estes	1903–1989	1955–1972	1959–1972	1972–1989	Eisenhower	death
9	Leo Brewster	1903–1979	1961–1973	1972–1973	1973–1979	Kennedy	death
10	Sarah T. Hughes	1896–1985	1961–1975	—	1975–1985	Kennedy	death
11	William McLaughlin Taylor Jr.	1909–1985	1966–1979	1973–1977	1979–1985	L. Johnson	death
12	Halbert Owen Woodward	1918–2000	1968–1986	1977–1986	1986–2000	L. Johnson	death
13	Robert Madden Hill	1928–1987	1970–1984	—	—	Nixon	elevation
14	Eldon Brooks Mahon	1918–2005	1972–1989	—	1989–2005	Nixon	death
15	Robert William Porter	1926–1991	1974–1990	1986–1989	1990–1991	Nixon	death
16	Patrick Higginbotham	1938–present	1975–1982	—	—	Ford	elevation
17	David Owen Belew Jr.	1920–2001	1979–1990	—	1990–2001	Carter	death
18	Mary Lou Robinson	1926–2019	1979–2016	—	2016–2019	Carter	death
19	Harold Barefoot Sanders Jr.	1925–2008	1979–1996	1989–1995	1996–2008	Carter	death
20	Jerry Buchmeyer	1933–2009	1979–2003	1995–2001	2003–2009	Carter	death
25	John H. McBryde	1931–2022	1990–2018	—	2018–2022	G.H.W. Bush	death
26	Jorge Antonio Solis	1951–2021	1991–2016	2014–2016	—	G.H.W. Bush	retirement
28	Elton Joe Kendall	1954–present	1992–2002	—	—	G.H.W. Bush	resignation
30	Barbara M. Lynn	1952–present	1999–2023	2016–2022	2023–2025	Clinton	retirement

== Chief judges ==
Chief judges have administrative responsibilities with respect to their district court. Unlike the Supreme Court, where one justice is specifically nominated to be chief, the office of chief judge rotates among the district court judges. To be chief, a judge must have been in active service on the court for at least one year, be under the age of 65, and have not previously served as chief judge.

A vacancy is filled by the judge highest in seniority among the group of qualified judges. The chief judge serves for a term of seven years, or until age 70, whichever occurs first. The age restrictions are waived if no members of the court would otherwise be qualified for the position.

When the office was created in 1948, the chief judge was the longest-serving judge who had not elected to retire, on what has since 1958 been known as senior status, or declined to serve as chief judge. After August 6, 1959, judges could not become or remain chief after turning 70 years old. The current rules have been in operation since October 1, 1982.

== Succession of seats ==
Seat 1
Seat established on February 24, 1879 by 20 Stat. 318
McCormick	1879–1892
Rector	1892–1898
Seat abolished on April 9, 1898 pursuant to 30 Stat. 240

Seat 2
Seat established on February 9, 1898 by 30 Stat. 240
Meek	1899–1935
Davidson	1936–1965
Taylor, Jr.	1966–1979
Buchmeyer	1979–2003
Boyle	2004–2025
vacant	2025–present

Seat 3
Seat established on February 26, 1919 by 40 Stat. 1183
Wilson	1919–1947
Dooley	1947–1966
Woodward	1968–1986
Cummings	1987–2014
Hendrix	2019–present

Seat 4
Seat established on September 14, 1922 by 42 Stat. 837 (temporary)
Seat made permanent on August 19, 1935 by 49 Stat. 659
Atwell	1923–1954
Estes	1955–1972
Mahon	1972–1989
McBryde	1990–2018
Pittman	2019–present

Seat 5
Seat established on May 19, 1961 by 75 Stat. 80
Brewster	1961–1973
Porter	1974–1990
Solis	1991–2016
Scholer	2018–present

Seat 6
Seat established on May 19, 1961 by 75 Stat. 80
Hughes	1962–1975
Higginbotham	1975–1982
Fish	1983–2007
O'Connor	2007–present

Seat 7
Seat established on June 2, 1970 by 84 Stat. 294
Hill	1970–1984
Fitzwater	1986–2018
Starr	2019–present

Seat 8
Seat established on October 20, 1978 by 92 Stat. 1629
Belew, Jr.	1979–1990
Means	1991–2013
Brown	2019–present

Seat 9
Seat established on October 20, 1978 by 92 Stat. 1629
Robinson	1979–2016
Kacsmaryk	2019–present

Seat 10
Seat established on October 20, 1978 by 92 Stat. 1629
Sanders	1979–1996
Lynn	1999–2023
Mitchell	2026–present

Seat 11
Seat established on July 10, 1984 by 98 Stat. 333
Maloney	1985–2000
Godbey	2002–2025
Coker	2026–present

Seat 12
Seat established on December 1, 1990 by 104 Stat. 5089
Kendall	1992–2002
Kinkeade	2002–present

Seat 13
Seat established on December 1, 1990 by 104 Stat. 5089
Lindsay	1998–present

== See also ==
- Courts of Texas
- List of current United States district judges
- List of United States federal courthouses in Texas
