= Joseph Brannon Dooley =

American judge (1889–1967)

Senior Judge of the United States District Court for the Northern District of Texas
- In office October 1, 1966 – January 19, 1967

Chief Judge of the United States District Court for the Northern District of Texas
- In office 1959
- Preceded by: Thomas Whitfield Davidson
- Succeeded by: Joe Ewing Estes

Judge of the United States District Court for the Northern District of Texas
- In office July 9, 1947 – October 1, 1966
- Appointed by: Harry S. Truman
- Preceded by: James Clifton Wilson
- Succeeded by: Halbert Owen Woodward

Personal details
- Born: Joseph Brannon Dooley; December 13, 1889 San Angelo, Texas, U.S.
- Died: January 19, 1967 (aged 77)
- Education: University of Texas School of Law (LL.B.)

Joseph Brannon Dooley (December 13, 1889 – January 19, 1967) was a United States district judge of the United States District Court for the Northern District of Texas.

== Education and career ==
Born in San Angelo, Texas, Dooley received a Bachelor of Laws from the University of Texas School of Law in 1911. He was in private practice in Amarillo, Texas from 1911 to 1947, serving as President of the State Bar of Texas from 1944 to 1945.

== Federal judicial service ==
On January 8, 1947, Dooley was nominated by President Harry S. Truman to a seat on the United States District Court for the Northern District of Texas vacated by Judge James Clifton Wilson. Dooley was confirmed by the United States Senate on July 8, 1947, and received his commission on July 9, 1947. He served as Chief Judge in 1959, and assumed senior status on October 1, 1966. Dooley served in that capacity until his death on January 19, 1967.

== Sources ==
Legal offices
Preceded by James Clifton Wilson	Judge of the United States District Court for the Northern District of Texas; 1947–1966	Succeeded by Halbert Owen Woodward
Preceded by Thomas Whitfield Davidson	Chief Judge of the United States District Court for the Northern District of Texas; 1959	Succeeded by Joe Ewing Estes
