= Thomas Whitfield Davidson =

American judge (1876–1974)

Senior Judge of the United States District Court for the Northern District of Texas
- In office November 1, 1965 – January 26, 1974

Chief Judge of the United States District Court for the Northern District of Texas
- In office 1954–1959
- Preceded by: William H. Atwell
- Succeeded by: Joseph Brannon Dooley

Judge of the United States District Court for the Northern District of Texas
- In office February 5, 1936 – November 1, 1965
- Appointed by: Franklin D. Roosevelt
- Preceded by: Edward Roscoe Meek
- Succeeded by: William McLaughlin Taylor Jr.

27th Lieutenant Governor of Texas
- In office January 16, 1923 – January 20, 1925
- Governor: Pat Morris Neff
- Preceded by: Lynch Davidson
- Succeeded by: Barry Miller

Personal details
- Born: Thomas Whitfield Davidson; September 23, 1876 Harrison County, Texas, U.S.
- Died: January 26, 1974 (aged 97)
- Education: read law

Thomas Whitfield Davidson (September 23, 1876 – January 26, 1974) was a United States district judge of the United States District Court for the Northern District of Texas.

== Education and career ==
Born in Harrison County, Texas, Davidson read law to enter the bar in 1903. He briefly attended East Texas State Normal College (now Texas A&M University–Commerce) before studying at the University of Chicago and then Columbia University. He was in private practice in Marshall, Texas from 1903 to 1907. He was the city attorney of Marshall 1907 to 1914, thereafter resuming his private practice in Dallas, Texas until 1920. Davidson was a member of the Texas Senate from 1920 to 1922, and was lieutenant governor of Texas from 1923 to 1925 serving under Governor Pat Morris Neff. He then returned to private practice in Dallas until 1936.

== Federal judicial service ==
On January 22, 1936, Davidson was nominated by President Franklin D. Roosevelt to a seat on the United States District Court for the Northern District of Texas vacated by Judge Edward Roscoe Meek. Davidson was confirmed by the United States Senate on January 30, 1936, and received his commission on February 5, 1936. He served as Chief Judge from 1954 to 1959, and assumed senior status on November 1, 1965, holding that position until his death on January 26, 1974.

== Sources ==
Party political offices
Preceded by Lynch Davidson	Democratic nominee for Lieutenant Governor of Texas; 1922	Succeeded by Barry Miller
Political offices
Preceded by Lynch Davidson	Lieutenant Governor of Texas; 1923–1925	Succeeded by Barry Miller
Legal offices
Preceded by Edward Roscoe Meek	Judge of the United States District Court for the Northern District of Texas; 1936–1965	Succeeded by William McLaughlin Taylor Jr.
Preceded by William H. Atwell	Chief Judge of the United States District Court for the Northern District of Texas; 1954–1959	Succeeded by Joseph Brannon Dooley
