= Halbert Owen Woodward =

American judge

Senior Judge of the United States District Court for the Northern District of Texas
- In office December 30, 1986 – October 2, 2000

Chief Judge of the United States District Court for the Northern District of Texas
- In office 1977–1986
- Preceded by: William McLaughlin Taylor Jr.
- Succeeded by: Robert William Porter

Judge of the United States District Court for the Northern District of Texas
- In office June 7, 1968 – December 30, 1986
- Appointed by: Lyndon B. Johnson
- Preceded by: Joseph Brannon Dooley
- Succeeded by: Samuel Ray Cummings

Personal details
- Born: Halbert Owen Woodward; April 8, 1918 Coleman, Texas, U.S.
- Died: October 2, 2000 (aged 82) Brownwood, Texas, U.S.
- Education: University of Texas at Austin (BBA, LLB)

Halbert Owen Woodward (April 8, 1918 – October 2, 2000) was a United States district judge of the United States District Court for the Northern District of Texas.

== Education and career ==
Born in Coleman, Texas, Woodward received a Bachelor of Business Administration degree from the University of Texas at Austin in 1940 and a Bachelor of Laws from the University of Texas School of Law in 1940. He was a hearing examiner for the Texas Employment Commission from 1940 to 1941. He was a title examiner for the Humble Oil and Refining Company from 1941 to 1942. He was in the United States Navy as a Lieutenant during World War II, from 1942 to 1945. He was a land and title supervisor for the Humble Oil and Refining Company from 1945 to 1949. He was in private practice in Coleman from 1949 to 1968. He was a member of the Highway Commission of the State of Texas from 1959 to 1968, and chairman from 1967 to 1968.

== Federal judicial service ==
Woodward was nominated by President Lyndon B. Johnson on April 25, 1968, to a seat on the United States District Court for the Northern District of Texas vacated by Judge Joseph Brannon Dooley. He was confirmed by the United States Senate on June 6, 1968, and received his commission on June 7, 1968. He served as Chief Judge from 1977 to 1986. He assumed senior status on December 30, 1986. Woodward served in that capacity until his death on October 2, 2000, in Brownwood, Texas.

== Sources ==
Legal offices
Preceded by Joseph Brannon Dooley	Judge of the United States District Court for the Northern District of Texas; 1968–1986	Succeeded by Samuel Ray Cummings
Preceded by William McLaughlin Taylor Jr.	Chief Judge of the United States District Court for the Northern District of Texas; 1977–1986	Succeeded by Robert William Porter
