= Jennifer Walker Elrod =

American judge (born 1966)

Jennifer Elrod
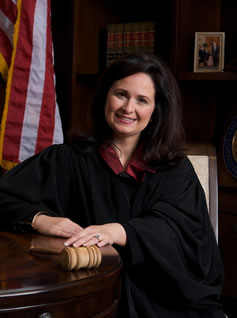
- Elrod in 2007

Chief Judge of the United States Court of Appeals for the Fifth Circuit
- Incumbent
- Assumed office October 4, 2024
- Preceded by: Priscilla Richman

Judge of the United States Court of Appeals for the Fifth Circuit
- Incumbent
- Assumed office October 19, 2007
- Appointed by: George W. Bush
- Preceded by: Patrick Higginbotham

Judge of the 190th Texas District Court
- In office April 23, 2002 – October 4, 2007
- Appointed by: Rick Perry
- Preceded by: John Devine
- Succeeded by: Patricia Kerrigan

Personal details
- Born: Jennifer Leigh Walker; 1966 (age 59–60) Port Arthur, Texas, U.S.
- Party: Republican
- Education: Baylor University (BA); Harvard University (JD)

Jennifer Walker Elrod (née Walker; 1966) is an American lawyer and jurist serving as the chief United States circuit judge of the United States Court of Appeals for the Fifth Circuit. She previously served as a state court judge on the 190th District Court of Texas from 2002 to 2007.

== Background ==
Elrod was born Jennifer Leigh Walker in 1966 in Port Arthur, Texas, and grew up in Baytown, Texas.

After high school, Elrod studied economics at Baylor University, graduating in 1988 with a Bachelor of Arts, magna cum laude. At Baylor, she was the Outstanding Graduating Senior of the Honors Program and was eventually named Outstanding Young Alumna. She went to Harvard Law School in 1989 and received her Juris Doctor in 1992, graduating cum laude. At Harvard Law School, she was a member of the Board of Student Advisers, an active member of the Harvard Federalist Society, and a finalist in the Ames Moot Court competition. She became a member of the State Bar of Texas in 1992.

After law school, Elrod was a law clerk for Judge Sim Lake of the United States District Court for the Southern District of Texas from 1992 to 1994. She then entered private practice at the law firm Baker Botts.

== Judicial career ==
=== State judicial service ===
In 2002, Governor Rick Perry appointed Elrod to be a judge on the 190th District Court in Harris County. She was elected to the judgeship in the 2002 general election, and again in 2006 when she ran unopposed. As a state district court judge, she presided over jury and bench trials involving civil litigation. Elrod remained on the Harris County bench until her confirmation to the Fifth Circuit.

=== Federal judicial service ===
President George W. Bush nominated Elrod to a vacancy on the New Orleans-based United States Court of Appeals for the Fifth Circuit, the primary court of appeals for all federal trial court cases in Texas, Mississippi and Louisiana, on March 29, 2007, She succeeded Judge Patrick Higginbotham, who assumed senior status on August 26, 2006. Elrod received a hearing before the Senate Judiciary Committee on July 19, 2007, and was voted out of committee on September 20, 2007. She was confirmed by the United States Senate by voice vote on October 4, 2007. She received her commission on October 19, 2007. She maintains chambers in Houston, Texas.

She has authored significant rulings against abortion rights, gun control and Obamacare. In 2022, Elrod ruled that the SEC's in-house adjudication of securities fraud charges was unconstitutional under the Seventh Amendment, Article I, and Article II of the Constitution. The Supreme Court affirmed her ruling on Seventh Amendment grounds in a 6–3 decision in 2024.

On October 4, 2024, Elrod was named chief judge of the Fifth Circuit.

Elrod has served on the Judicial Conference of the United States in multiple capacities. From 2018 to 2024, Elrod was a member of the Committee on Codes of Conduct, serving as Chair from 2021 to 2024. She also previously served on the Committee on Judicial Security. In 2025, Chief Justice John Roberts appointed Elrod to the Judicial Conference's Executive Committee.

== Law clerks ==
Elrod's former law clerks include:

- Phil Axt, Solicitor General of North Dakota and nominee for judge, United States District Court for the District of North Dakota
- Katy Boatman, justice, Texas Courts of Appeals
- Catherine Eschbach, Principal Deputy General Counsel, United States Equal Employment Opportunity Commission
- April Farris, justice, Texas Courts of Appeals
- John Greil, Clinical Professor, University of Texas at Austin School of Law
- Caleb Orr (2024-2025), Senior Advisor to the President and Senior Advisor for Policy for International Affairs and former Assistant Secretary of State for Economic and Business Affairs
- Jordan Pratt (2014-2015), judge, United States District Court for the Middle District of Florida

== Sources ==
- "Elrod, Jennifer Walker". Federal Judicial Center.
- "Advisors". Harvard Journal of Law & Public Policy. 24 March 2009.
- "Jennifer Walker Elrod". The Federalist Society.

Legal offices
Preceded by Patrick Higginbotham	Judge of the United States Court of Appeals for the Fifth Circuit; 2007–present	Incumbent
Preceded by Priscilla Richman	Chief Judge of the United States Court of Appeals for the Fifth Circuit; 2024–present	Incumbent
