= John H. McBryde =

American judge (1931–2022)

Senior Judge of the United States District Court for the Northern District of Texas
- In office October 9, 2018 – December 25, 2022

Judge of the United States District Court for the Northern District of Texas
- In office August 7, 1990 – October 9, 2018
- Appointed by: George H. W. Bush
- Preceded by: Eldon Brooks Mahon
- Succeeded by: Mark T. Pittman

Personal details
- Born: October 9, 1931 Jackson, Mississippi, U.S.
- Died: December 25, 2022 (aged 91)
- Education: Texas Christian University (BS); University of Texas (LLB)

John Henry McBryde (October 9, 1931 – December 25, 2022) was an American lawyer who served as a United States district judge of the United States District Court for the Northern District of Texas from 1990 to 2022.

== Education and career ==
McBryde was born in Jackson, Mississippi, on October 9, 1931. He received a Bachelor of Science degree from Texas Christian University in 1953. He received a Bachelor of Laws from the University of Texas School of Law in 1956. He was in private practice in Fort Worth from 1956 to 1990.

== Federal judicial service ==
McBryde was nominated by President George H. W. Bush on May 11, 1990, to a seat on the United States District Court for the Northern District of Texas vacated by Judge Eldon B. Mahon. He was confirmed by the United States Senate on August 3, 1990, and received his commission on August 7, 1990. He assumed senior status on October 9, 2018.

== Fifth Circuit sanctions ==
On December 31, 1997, the Judicial Council of the Fifth Circuit Court of the United States issued an order sanctioning Judge McBryde for conduct prejudicial to the effective administration of the business of the courts.

== Personal life and death ==
McBryde died on December 25, 2022, at the age of 91.

Legal offices
| Preceded by Eldon Brooks Mahon | Judge of the United States District Court for the Northern District of Texas; 1990–2018 | Succeeded by Mark T. Pittman |
