= Leo Brewster =

American judge

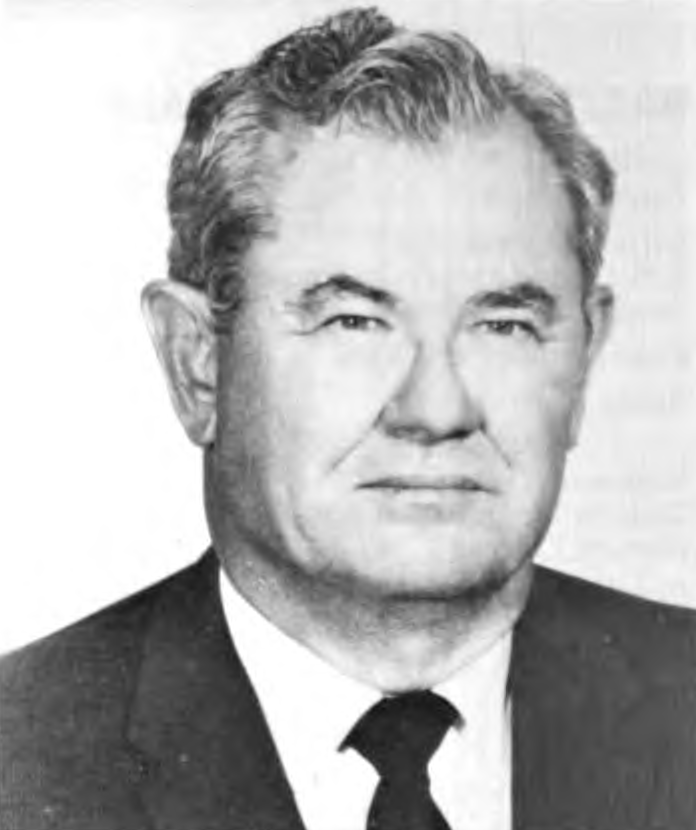

Senior Judge of the United States District Court for the Northern District of Texas
- In office November 1, 1973 – November 27, 1979

Chief Judge of the United States District Court for the Northern District of Texas
- In office 1972–1973
- Preceded by: Joe Ewing Estes
- Succeeded by: William McLaughlin Taylor Jr.

Judge of the United States District Court for the Northern District of Texas
- In office October 5, 1961 – November 1, 1973
- Appointed by: John F. Kennedy
- Preceded by: Seat established by 75 Stat. 80
- Succeeded by: Robert William Porter

Personal details
- Born: Henry Leo Brewster; October 16, 1903 Fort Worth, Texas, U.S.
- Died: November 27, 1979 (aged 76) Fort Worth, Texas, U.S.
- Education: University of Texas School of Law (LL.B.)

Henry Leo Brewster (October 16, 1903 – November 27, 1979) was a United States district judge of the United States District Court for the Northern District of Texas.

== Education and career ==
Born in Fort Worth, Texas, Brewster received a Bachelor of Laws from the University of Texas School of Law in 1926. He was in private practice in Fort Worth from 1926 to 1962. He was an assistant district attorney of Tarrant County, Texas from 1935 to 1939.

== Federal judicial service ==
On October 5, 1961, Brewster received a recess appointment from President John F. Kennedy to a new seat on the United States District Court for the Northern District of Texas created by 75 Stat. 80. He was formally nominated to the same seat by President Kennedy on January 15, 1962. He was confirmed by the United States Senate on March 16, 1962, and received his commission on March 17, 1962. He served as Chief Judge from 1972 to 1973, assuming senior status on November 1, 1973. Brewster served in that capacity until his death on November 27, 1979, in Fort Worth.

== Sources ==
Legal offices
| Preceded by Seat established by 75 Stat. 80 | Judge of the United States District Court for the Northern District of Texas; 1961–1973 | Succeeded by Robert William Porter |
| Preceded by Joe Ewing Estes | Chief Judge of the United States District Court for the Northern District of Texas; 1972–1973 | Succeeded by William McLaughlin Taylor Jr. |
