= Karen Gren Scholer =

American judge (born 1957)

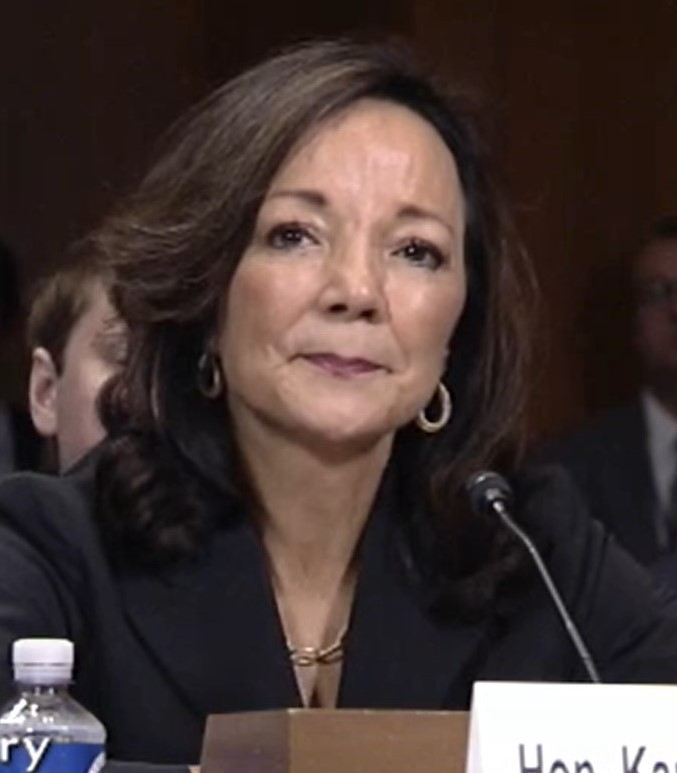

Judge of the United States District Court for the Northern District of Texas
- Incumbent
- Assumed office March 6, 2018
- Appointed by: Donald Trump
- Preceded by: Jorge Antonio Solis

Judge of the 95th District Court of Texas
- In office January 1, 2001 – December 31, 2008
- Succeeded by: Ken Molberg

Personal details
- Born: Karen Anne Gren; 1957 (age 68–69) Tokyo, Japan
- Party: Republican
- Education: Rice University (BA); Cornell University (JD)

Karen Anne Gren Scholer (née Gren; born 1957) is an American lawyer who serves as a United States district judge of the United States District Court for the Northern District of Texas.

== Biography ==
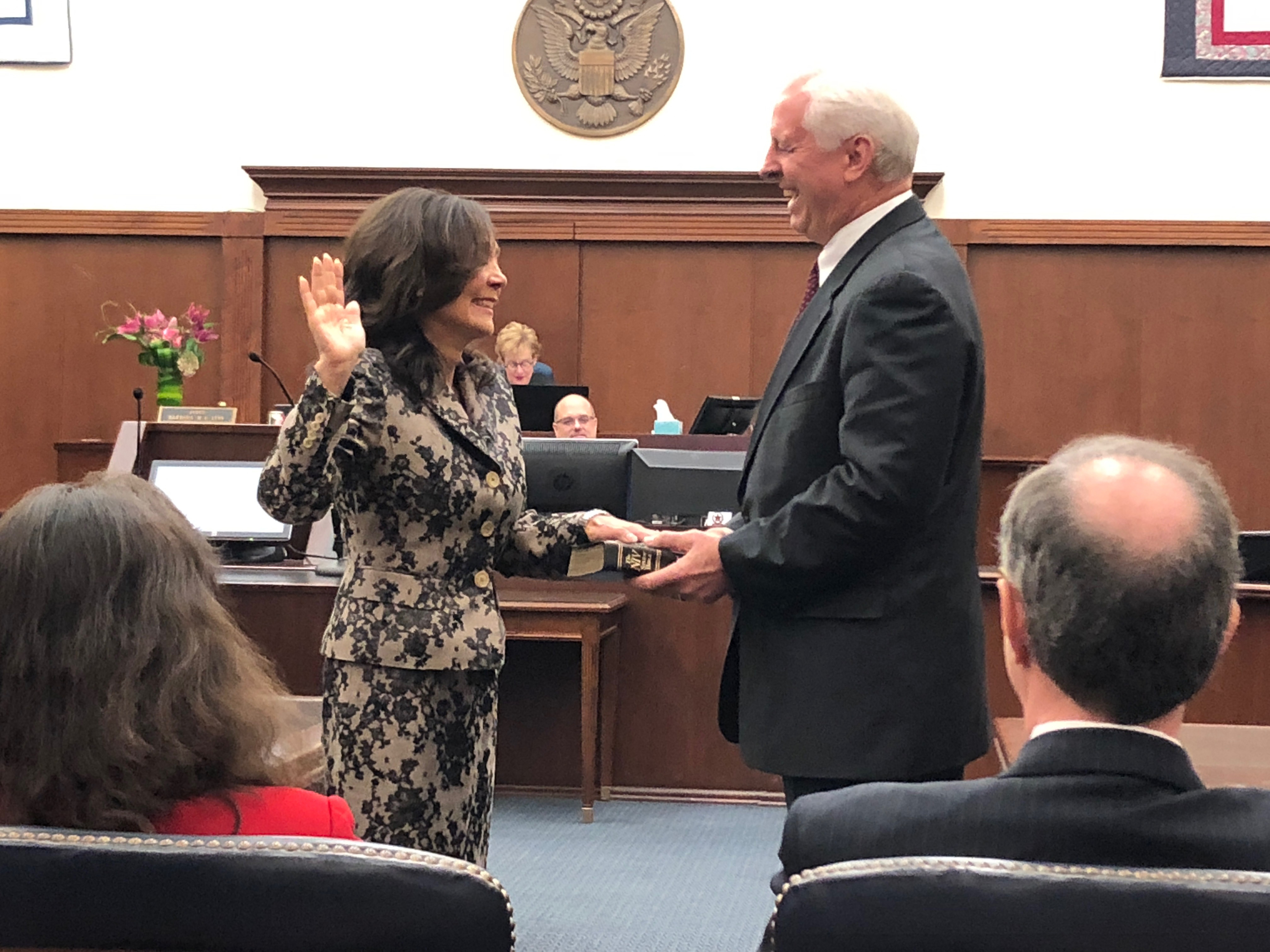
Scholer being sworn in in 2018

Scholer received a Bachelor of Arts degree in 1979 from Rice University. She received a Juris Doctor in 1982 from Cornell Law School. She started her legal career as an associate at the law firm of Strasburger & Price, LLP, in Dallas, where she was employed from 1982 to 1996. She was elevated to partner in 1989. From 1996 to 2000, she was a partner at the law firm of Andrews Kurth in Houston. In private practice, she focused on employment, commercial, and anti trust law.

In 2000, Scholer was elected as a Republican to be a state district judge for the 95th Judicial District Court of Dallas County She was re-elected without opposition in 2004, serving in this position until 2008. In 2007, she also served as the presiding judge for the Dallas County Civil District Judges. From 2009 to 2013, she was a partner at the law firm of Jones Day. From 2014 to 2018, Scholer was a principal in the law firm of Carter Scholer Arnett Hamada & Mockler, PLLC, where she specialized in business litigation, complex tort litigation, and alternative dispute resolution. She was promoted to a co-managing partner in 2015.

== Federal judicial service ==
=== Expired nomination to Eastern District of Texas under Obama ===
On March 15, 2016, President Barack Obama agreed with U.S. Senators John Cornyn and Ted Cruz to nominate Scholer to serve as a United States district judge of the United States District Court for the Eastern District of Texas as part of a bipartisan package of nominees which included E. Scott Frost, to the seat vacated by Judge Richard A. Schell, who assumed senior status on March 10, 2015. On September 7, 2016, a hearing before the Senate Judiciary Committee was held on her nomination. Her nomination generated no controversy, but the Senate had a large backlog of nominees and bills. Her nomination expired on January 3, 2017, with the end of the 114th Congress.

=== Nomination to Northern District of Texas under Trump ===
On September 7, 2017, Scholer was renominated to a district court by President Donald Trump. However, she was nominated to serve as a United States district judge of the United States District Court for the Northern District of Texas, to the seat vacated by Judge Jorge Antonio Solis, who retired on May 1, 2016. On October 26, 2017, her nomination was reported out of committee by a voice vote. On March 1, 2018, the Senate invoked cloture on her nomination by a 96–1 vote. On March 5, her nomination was confirmed by a 95–0 vote. She received her commission on March 6, 2018, and was sworn into office on March 7, 2018. Scholer is the first Asian-American federal district judge in the state of Texas.

== Electoral history ==
2000

95th Judicial District Court – Republican Primary, March 14, 2000
Party	Candidate	Votes	%
Republican	Karen Johnson	37,540	54.68%
Republican	Sally Montgomery	31,117	45.32%
Majority		6,423	9.36%
Total votes		68,657	100.00%

95th Judicial District Court – Election Results, November 7, 2000
Party	Candidate	Votes	%	±%
Republican	Karen Johnson	316,866	100.00%	±0.00%
Majority		316,866	100.00%	±0.00%
Total votes		316,866	100.00%	±0.00%
Republican hold		Swing	±0.00%	

2004

95th Judicial District Court – Republican Primary, March 9, 2004
Party	Candidate	Votes	%	±%
Republican	Karen Johnson	23,400	100.00%	+45.32%
Majority		23,400	100.00%	+90.64%
Total votes		23,400	100.00%	−65.92%

95th Judicial District Court – Election Results, November 2, 2004
Party	Candidate	Votes	%	±%
Republican	Karen Johnson		100.00%	±0.00%
Majority			100.00%	±0.00%
Total votes			100.00%	±0.00%
Republican hold		Swing	±0.00%	

== See also ==
- Barack Obama judicial appointment controversies
- List of Asian American jurists
- List of first women lawyers and judges in Texas

Legal offices
Preceded by Jorge Antonio Solis	Judge of the United States District Court for the Northern District of Texas; 2018–present	Incumbent
