= Mississippi Christian University School of Law =

Law school in Jackson, Mississippi, US

- Motto: Motion to succeed
- Parent school: Mississippi Christian University
- Established: 1930
- School type: Private
- Parent endowment: $89.2 Million
- Dean: John P. Anderson
- Location: Jackson, Mississippi, US; 32.302952°N 90.187332°W
- Enrollment: 432 (FT)
- Faculty: 25 (FT) 10 (PT)
- USNWR ranking: 158th (tie) (2025)
- Bar pass rate: 81.63% (2025 first-time takers) 88.24% (2025 in Mississippi) 88.89% (2025 in Louisiana) |url=https://www.abarequireddisclosures.org/BarPassageOutcomes.aspx |access-date=September 26, 2026}}
- Website: law.mc.edu
- ABA profile: Mississippi College School of Law

Mississippi Christian University School of Law (MC Law or MC Law School) is the law school of Mississippi Christian University, a private university in Jackson, Mississippi. MC Law is one of two law schools in the state of Mississippi and the only law school in Jackson, the state capital. It is accredited by the American Bar Association.

== History ==
The law school was founded in 1930 as the Jackson School of Law. In 1975, the law school was acquired by Mississippi College, which changed its name in 2026 to Mississippi Christian University. In 1980, MC Law gained full ABA accreditation. MC Law is one of two law schools in the state of Mississippi, and the only law school in the capital, Jackson. Since 1990, MC Law has been a member of the Association of American Law Schools (AALS).

The law school changed its name as a part of the main campus's bicentennital celebration and name change in 2026.

== Campus ==
The Mississippi Christian University School of Law is located in the historic sector of downtown Jackson, within walking distance of City Hall, the Mississippi Supreme Court, the Federal District Courts, historic Farish Street, and the Governor's Mansion.

In December 2005, MC Law completed a construction and renovation project which more than doubled the size of the original campus. A new classroom building was added along with an auditorium building. The Law Library occupies three floors in the Law School's West Wing, and contains one of the largest Mississippi collections of legal books, journals and microforms including statutes, court reports, digests, encyclopedias, treatises, loose-leaf services, periodicals and government documents. Beginning in 2013, the Law Library is also the repository of the Mississippi Legislature's video archive footage. The main campus for Mississippi Christian University is located about 15 miles to the west in Clinton, Mississippi.

== Academics ==
MC Law enjoys a strong bar passage rate. In 2025, its graduates passed at an 89% rate in Mississippi and 93.7% in Louisiana.

MC Law offers courses in common law and a certificate in Louisiana civil law.

MC Law has more than 25 full-time faculty members in all major disciplines of law, with more than 20% of the faculty holding a PhD or equivalent degree, and more than 50% of the faculty with an LL.M. or Masters in a specialized field. The Law School provides a national certificate programs for civil law training, and hosts six centers, the Mississippi Christian University Law Review, and a Moot Court program. The Law School also offers an externship program with more than 50 students at any one time placed in externships, and more than 85% of MC Law students completing an externship or working part-time in the legal field prior to graduation. Since 2010, the Law School has offered a one-year LL.M. degree in U.S. legal studies for students holding law degrees from foreign law programs.

Each year, MC Law offers students study abroad programs in France, Cuba, Mexico, and South Korea. MC Law was one of the first U.S. law schools to offer a program in Cuba, and the only U.S. law school to offer a program in 2026.

== Admissions ==
For the class entering in 2024, the law school accepted 481 out of 725 applicants (a 66.34% acceptance rate) with 132 of those accepted enrolling, a 27.44% yield rate (the percentage of accepted students who enrolled). Seven students were not included in the acceptance statistics. The class consists of 139 students. The median LSAT score was 150 and the median undergraduate GPA was 3.31. The reported 25th/75th percentile LSAT scores and GPAs were 147/154 and 3.04/3.62.

== Employment ==
According to MC Law's official 2025 ABA-required disclosures, 85% of the Class of 2024 were employed in professional positions with 76% of the class having obtained JD-required employment (i.e., as attorneys) within 10 months after graduation.

MC Law ranked #26 in the country in 2025 and #30 in 2026 for rates of placing graduates in federal judicial clerkships. MC Law ranked #2 in the country for biggest gains in federal judicial clerkships from 2021 to 2025.

MC Law was also #1 Army JAG feeder school in the country in 2023 and 2024. Pre-Law Magazine ranks MC Law a top school for Health Law and Family Law.

== Notable alumni ==
- Medgar Evers (2026) - civil rights activist, honorary degree
- Kristi Haskins Johnson (2008) - Judge, U.S. District Court for the Southern District of Mississippi
- Jenifer Branning (2004) - Justice, Mississippi Supreme Court.
- Andy Gipson (2002) - Politician; Mississippi Agriculture and Commerce Commissioner
- Sean Tindell (2001) - Mississippi Public Safety Commissioner
- Jennifer Riley Collins (1999) - Executive Director of the Mississippi ACLU
- Stephen Dillard (1996) - Chief Judge of the Georgia Court of Appeals
- Joey Fillingane (1998) - Mississippi State Senator 2007–Present
- Jason White (1998) - Mississippi Speaker of the House
- Robert Hurt (1995) - member, United States House of Representatives for Virginia's 5th District 2012–2017
- Amy Tuck (1989) - former Lieutenant Governor, Mississippi
- Sharion Aycock (1980) - Judge, U.S. District Court for the Northern District of Mississippi
- William F. Winter - Former Governor of Mississippi, honorary degree

Two MC Law graduates, Krissy Nobile and G. Todd Butler, each recently argued cases before the United States Supreme Court..

In 2026 President Donald Trump nominated MC Law graduate G. Todd Butler to the U.S. Court of Appeals for the 5th Circuit to fill the seat held by Judge Leslie H. Southwick.

In 2026 President Trump also nominated MC Law graduate Courtney Coker to the U.S. District Court for the Northern District of Texas.

== See also ==
- Mississippi Christian University main campus in Clinton, Mississippi
