= Jorge Antonio Solis =

American judge (1951–2021)

Chief Judge of the United States District Court for the Northern District of Texas
- In office November 13, 2014 – May 1, 2016
- Preceded by: Sidney A. Fitzwater
- Succeeded by: Barbara M. Lynn

Judge of the United States District Court for the Northern District of Texas
- In office September 16, 1991 – May 1, 2016
- Appointed by: George H. W. Bush
- Preceded by: Robert William Porter
- Succeeded by: Karen Gren Scholer

Personal details
- Born: May 1, 1951 San Ygnacio, Texas, U.S.
- Died: October 8, 2021 (aged 70)
- Education: McMurry College (BA); University of Texas School of Law (JD)

Jorge Antonio Solis (May 1, 1951 – October 8, 2021) was a United States District Judge and Chief Judge of the United States District Court for the Northern District of Texas.

== Education and career ==
Born in San Ygnacio, Texas, Solis received a Bachelor of Arts degree from McMurry College in 1973 and a Juris Doctor from the University of Texas School of Law in 1976. He was an assistant criminal district attorney of the Taylor County Criminal District Attorney's Office in Abilene, Taylor County, Texas from 1976 to 1981. He was in private practice from 1981 to 1982, after which he returned to the Taylor County Criminal District Attorney's Office as a criminal district attorney from 1983 to 1987. He was a special prosecutor for the Narcotics Task Force in 1988. Solis then served as a Judge of the 350th District Court of Texas from 1989 to 1991.

== Federal judicial service ==
On June 19, 1991, Solis was nominated by President George H. W. Bush to a seat on the United States District Court for the Northern District of Texas vacated by Judge Robert William Porter. Solis was confirmed by the United States Senate on September 12, 1991, and received his commission on September 16, 1991. He became Chief Judge on November 13, 2014. He served as Chief Judge until he retired on May 1, 2016.

== See also ==
- List of Hispanic and Latino American jurists

Legal offices
| Preceded by Robert William Porter | Judge of the United States District Court for the Northern District of Texas; 1991–2016 | Succeeded by Karen Gren Scholer |
| Preceded by Sidney A. Fitzwater | Chief Judge of the United States District Court for the Northern District of Texas; 2014–2016 | Succeeded by Barbara M. Lynn |
