= Robert Madden Hill =

American judge (1928–1987)

Judge of the United States Court of Appeals for the Fifth Circuit
- In office June 15, 1984 – October 19, 1987
- Appointed by: Ronald Reagan
- Preceded by: John Robert Brown
- Succeeded by: Jacques L. Wiener Jr.

Judge of the United States District Court for the Northern District of Texas
- In office December 1, 1970 – July 20, 1984
- Appointed by: Richard Nixon
- Preceded by: Seat established by 84 Stat. 294
- Succeeded by: Sidney A. Fitzwater

Personal details
- Born: Robert Madden Hill; January 13, 1928 Dallas, Texas
- Died: October 19, 1987 (aged 59)
- Education: University of Texas (BBA, LLB)

Robert Madden Hill (January 13, 1928 – October 19, 1987) was a United States circuit judge of the United States Court of Appeals for the Fifth Circuit and a United States district judge of the United States District Court for the Northern District of Texas.

== Education and career ==
Born in Dallas, Texas, Hill received a Bachelor of Business Administration degree from the University of Texas in 1948 and a Bachelor of Laws from the University of Texas School of Law in 1950. He was in private practice in Dallas from 1950 to 1970.

== Federal judicial service ==
On October 7, 1970, Hill was nominated by President Richard Nixon to a new seat on the United States District Court for the Northern District of Texas created by 84 Stat. 294. He was confirmed by the United States Senate on November 25, 1970, and received his commission on December 1, 1970. His service terminated on July 20, 1984, due to elevation to the Fifth Circuit.

On June 4, 1984, President Ronald Reagan nominated Hill to a seat on the United States Court of Appeals for the Fifth Circuit vacated by Judge John Robert Brown. Hill was confirmed by the Senate on June 15, 1984, and received his commission the same day. He served in that capacity until his death.

== Death ==
Hill died on October 19, 1987, of an asthma attack, while on a flight from Africa. He and his wife had been returning from a vacation in Kenya.

== Sources ==
Legal offices
Preceded by Seat established by 84 Stat. 294	Judge of the United States District Court for the Northern District of Texas; 1970–1984	Succeeded by Sidney A. Fitzwater
Preceded by John Robert Brown	Judge of the United States Court of Appeals for the Fifth Circuit; 1984–1987	Succeeded by Jacques L. Wiener Jr.
