= Barbara M. Lynn =

American judge (born 1952)

Barbara M. G. Lynn
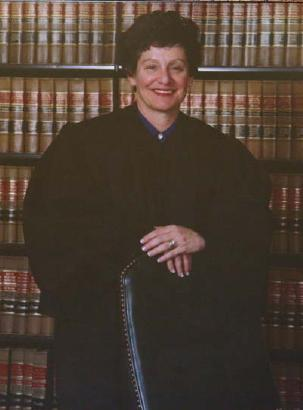
- Judge Lynn, circa 1999

Senior Judge of the United States District Court for the Northern District of Texas
- In office May 15, 2023 – August 1, 2025

Chief Judge of the United States District Court for the Northern District of Texas
- In office May 1, 2016 – September 6, 2022
- Preceded by: Jorge Antonio Solis
- Succeeded by: David C. Godbey

Judge of the United States District Court for the Northern District of Texas
- In office November 22, 1999 – May 15, 2023
- Appointed by: Bill Clinton
- Preceded by: Barefoot Sanders
- Succeeded by: Kasdin Mitchell

Personal details
- Born: September 19, 1952 (age 73) Binghamton, New York, U.S.
- Education: University of Virginia (BA); Southern Methodist University (JD)

Barbara M. G. Lynn (born September 19, 1952) is a former United States district judge of the United States District Court for the Northern District of Texas, with chambers in Dallas, Texas from 1999 to 2025.

== Early life and education ==
Born in Binghamton, New York, Lynn received a Bachelor of Arts degree from University of Virginia in 1973 where she was the first woman member of the Jefferson Literary and Debating Society. She received a Juris Doctor from Southern Methodist University Dedman School of Law in 1976.

== Career ==
Lynn was in private practice from 1976 to 1999 at the law firm Carrington Coleman in Dallas. Lynn was the firm's first female associate, from 1976 to 1982, and then became the firm's first female partner, from 1983 to 1999, prior to joining the bench.

=== Federal judicial service ===
On March 25, 1999, Lynn was nominated by President Bill Clinton to a seat on the United States District Court for the Northern District of Texas vacated by Barefoot Sanders. She was confirmed by the United States Senate on November 17, 1999, and received her commission on November 22, 1999. On May 1, 2016, she became the chief judge of the Northern District of Texas, the first woman to hold the position. Her term as chief judge ended on September 6, 2022. She assumed senior status on May 15, 2023, and retired from the court on August 1, 2025.

=== Notable cases ===
==== Dallas Mayor corruption ====
Lynn was the presiding judge in the case of former Dallas Mayor Pro-Tempore Don Hill. Hill, and his wife Sheila Farrington Hill were sentenced on February 26, 2010, after being convicted on bribery and money laundering charges. Don Hill was sentenced to eighteen years in prison while his wife was sentenced to nine years in prison. The judge called the actions "a betrayal to our city".

==== Lyrick Studios vs. Big Idea Productions ====
In 2001, film studio Lyrick Studios filed a lawsuit against Big Idea Productions, creator of the Christian show VeggieTales, for "breach of contract." The judge assigned to the case was Lynn, who denied Big Idea's request for summary judgement, thereby allowing the case to go to trial in April 2003. Lyrick argued that they had a binding though unsigned agreement with Big Idea to distribute VeggieTales for the company, and that Big Idea had breached the deal by moving to Warner Music at the end of 2001.

A jury ruled against Big Idea Productions and Lynn awarded Lyrick $11M as well as legal fees, causing Big Idea to file for bankruptcy. Big Idea appealed Lynn's ruling and the United States Court of Appeals for the Fifth Circuit overturned the judgement in August 2005, ruling that faxes and memos set out by Lyrick were not sufficient under the law; therefore, Lynn should have granted Big Idea's request for summary judgement.

==== Duncan v. Bonta ====
Sitting with the Ninth Circuit, Lynn dissented when the 9th circuit blocked California's law limiting gun magazine capacity to 10 bullets. The ruling was made on August 14, 2020. On November 30, 2021, the 9th circuit in a 7-4 decision, sitting en banc, reversed the prior decision and upheld the law, thus affirming Lynn's dissent.

== See also ==
- List of Jewish American jurists

Legal offices
Preceded by Barefoot Sanders	Judge of the United States District Court for the Northern District of Texas; 1999–2023	Succeeded by Kasdin Mitchell
Preceded by Jorge Antonio Solis	Chief Judge of the United States District Court for the Northern District of Texas; 2016–2022	Succeeded by David C. Godbey
