= William H. Atwell =

American judge

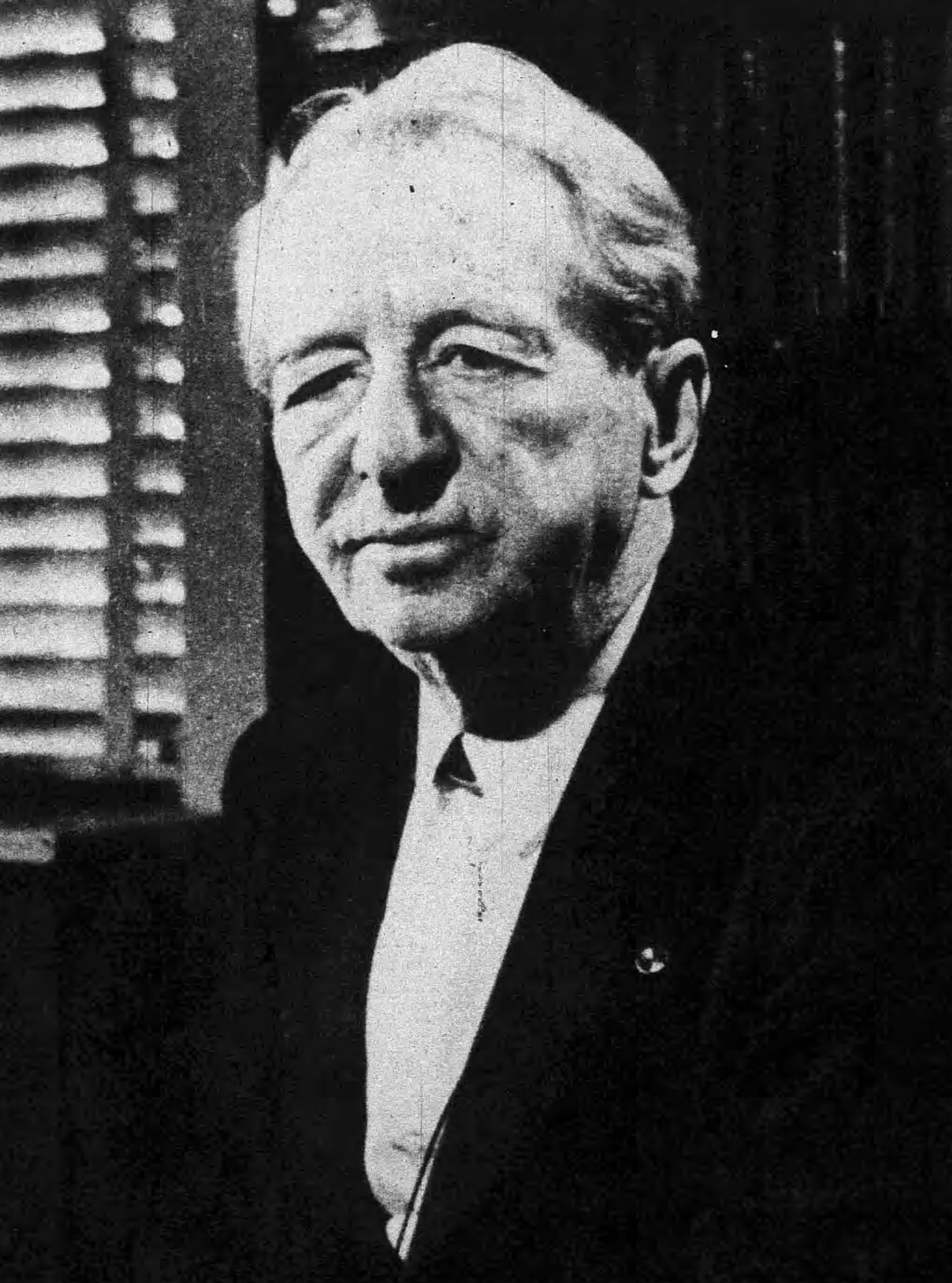

Senior Judge of the United States District Court for the Northern District of Texas
- In office December 31, 1954 – December 22, 1961

Chief Judge of the United States District Court for the Northern District of Texas
- In office 1948–1954
- Preceded by: Office established
- Succeeded by: Thomas Davidson

Judge of the United States District Court for the Northern District of Texas
- In office January 9, 1923 – December 31, 1954
- Appointed by: Warren G. Harding
- Preceded by: Seat established 42 Stat. 837
- Succeeded by: Joe Estes

Personal details
- Born: William Hawley Atwell; June 9, 1869 Sparta, Wisconsin, U.S.
- Died: December 22, 1961 (aged 92)
- Party: Republican
- Education: Southwestern University (AB, BS); University of Texas School of Law (LLB)

William Hawley Atwell (June 9, 1869 – December 22, 1961), frequently known as W. H. Atwell, was a United States district judge of the United States District Court for the Northern District of Texas.

== Education and career ==
Born in Sparta, Wisconsin, Atwell received an Artium Baccalaureus degree and Bachelor of Science degree from Southwestern University in 1889, and a Bachelor of Laws from the University of Texas School of Law in 1891. He was in private practice in Dallas, Texas, from 1891 to 1898. He was the United States Attorney for the Northern District of Texas from 1898 to 1913, thereafter returning to private practice in Dallas until 1924. Attwell also ran for Governor of Texas in 1922 as a Republican, but lost in a landslide, only receiving 18% of the vote. Atwell also served as the first commissioner for the Dallas Zoo, a position he held from 1912 to 1914.

== Federal judicial service ==
On December 30, 1922, Atwell was nominated by President Warren G. Harding to a new seat on the United States District Court for the Northern District of Texas created by 42 Stat. 837. He was confirmed by the United States Senate on January 9, 1923, and received his commission the same day. He served as Chief Judge from 1948 to 1954, assuming senior status on December 31, 1954. Atwell continued to serve in that capacity until his death on December 22, 1961.

== See also ==
- List of United States federal judges by longevity of service

== Sources ==
Party political offices
Preceded by J. G. Culbertson	Republican nominee for Governor of Texas; 1922	Succeeded by George C. Butte
Legal offices
Preceded by Seat established by 42 Stat. 837	Judge of the United States District Court for the Northern District of Texas; 1923–1954	Succeeded by Joe Ewing Estes
Preceded by Office established	Chief Judge of the United States District Court for the Northern District of Texas; 1948–1954	Succeeded by Thomas Whitfield Davidson
