= Robert William Porter =

American judge

Senior Judge of the United States District Court for the Northern District of Texas
- In office January 17, 1990 – November 6, 1991

Chief Judge of the United States District Court for the Northern District of Texas
- In office 1986–1989
- Preceded by: Halbert Owen Woodward
- Succeeded by: Barefoot Sanders

Judge of the United States District Court for the Northern District of Texas
- In office June 20, 1974 – January 17, 1990
- Appointed by: Richard Nixon
- Preceded by: Leo Brewster
- Succeeded by: Jorge Antonio Solis

Personal details
- Born: Robert William Porter; August 13, 1926 Monmouth, Illinois, U.S.
- Died: November 6, 1991 (aged 65) Dallas, Texas, U.S.
- Education: Monmouth College (A.B.); University of Michigan Law School (J.D.)

Robert William Porter (August 13, 1926 – November 6, 1991) was a United States district judge of the United States District Court for the Northern District of Texas.

== Education and career ==
Robert William Porter was born in Monmouth, Illinois. He served in the United States Navy during World War II from 1944 to 1946. Following his military service, he pursued higher education, earning an Artium Baccalaureus degree from Monmouth College in 1949 and a Juris Doctor from the University of Michigan Law School in 1952.

Upon completing his legal education, he began his professional career as home office counsel for the Reserve Life Insurance Company in Dallas, Texas, a position he held from 1952 to 1954. Subsequently, he entered private legal practice in Dallas, where he remained active from 1954 to 1974.

In addition to his legal career, he was engaged in public service. He served as a Councilman for the city of Richardson, from 1961 to 1966, and as Mayor from 1966 to 1967. During his tenure as Mayor, he also held the position of Mayor Pro Tem in 1966. From 1972 to 1974, he served as special counsel for County of Dallas.

== Federal judicial service ==
Porter was nominated by President Richard Nixon on April 22, 1974, to a seat on the United States District Court for the Northern District of Texas vacated by Judge Leo Brewster. He was confirmed by the United States Senate on June 13, 1974, and received his commission on June 20, 1974. He served as Chief Judge from 1986 to 1989. He assumed senior status due to a certified disability on January 17, 1990. His service terminated on November 6, 1991, due to his death in Dallas.

== Sources ==
Legal offices
Preceded by Leo Brewster	Judge of the United States District Court for the Northern District of Texas; 1974–1990	Succeeded by Jorge Antonio Solis
Preceded by Halbert Owen Woodward	Chief Judge of the United States District Court for the Northern District of Texas; 1986–1989	Succeeded by Barefoot Sanders
