= Brantley Starr =

American judge (born 1979)

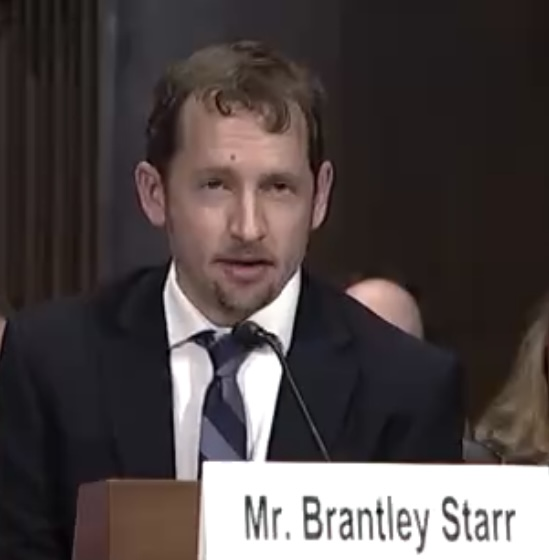

Judge of the United States District Court for the Northern District of Texas
- Incumbent
- Assumed office August 6, 2019
- Appointed by: Donald Trump
- Preceded by: Sidney A. Fitzwater

Deputy First Assistant Attorney General of Texas
- In office 2016–2019

Personal details
- Born: 1979 (age 46–47) San Antonio, Texas, U.S.
- Education: Abilene Christian University (BA); University of Texas (JD)

Brantley David Starr (born 1979) is a United States district judge of the United States District Court for the Northern District of Texas.

== Biography ==
Starr was born in 1979 in San Antonio, Texas. Ken Starr, who served as Solicitor General of the United States and as a judge of the United States Court of Appeals for the District of Columbia Circuit, is his uncle.

Starr received a Bachelor of Arts, summa cum laude, from Abilene Christian University in 2001 and a Juris Doctor from the University of Texas School of Law in 2004, where he was editor-in-chief of the Texas Review of Law and Politics.

After graduating from law school, he was a law clerk to then-Justice Don Willett of the Supreme Court of Texas. Starr then served as a staff attorney to Justice Eva Guzman of the Supreme Court of Texas, and then worked as an Assistant Attorney General, Assistant Solicitor General, and Deputy Attorney General for Legal Counsel, all in the office of the Attorney General of Texas. From 2016 to 2019, he served as the Deputy First Assistant Attorney General of Texas, under Ken Paxton.

=== Federal judicial service ===
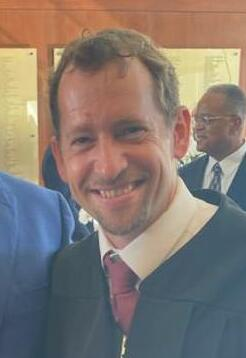
Starr in 2022

On March 8, 2019, President Donald Trump announced his intent to nominate Starr to serve as a United States District Judge of the United States District Court for the Northern District of Texas. On March 11, 2019, President Trump nominated Starr to the seat vacated by Judge Sidney A. Fitzwater, who assumed senior status on September 22, 2018. On April 10, 2019, a hearing on his nomination was held before the Senate Judiciary Committee. On May 9, 2019, his nomination was reported out of committee by a 12–10 vote. On July 30, 2019, the United States Senate invoked cloture on his nomination by a 51–37 vote. On July 31, 2019, his nomination was confirmed by a 51–39 vote. He received his judicial commission on August 6, 2019.

In May 2023, Starr banned lawyers from submitting AI-generated case filings that have not been reviewed by a human, noting that:

[Generative artificial intelligence] platforms in their current states are prone to hallucinations and bias. On hallucinations, they make stuff up—even quotes and citations. Another issue is reliability or bias. While attorneys swear an oath to set aside their personal prejudices, biases, and beliefs to faithfully uphold the law and represent their clients, generative artificial intelligence is the product of programming devised by humans who did not have to swear such an oath. As such, these systems hold no allegiance to any client, the rule of law, or the laws and Constitution of the United States (or, as addressed above, the truth). Unbound by any sense of duty, honor, or justice, such programs act according to computer code rather than conviction, based on programming rather than principle.

In August 2023, Starr ordered three Southwest Airlines lawyers to attend religious-liberty training by the Alliance Defending Freedom (ADF), a conservative Christian legal advocacy group. This was blocked by the Fifth Circuit, ruling “The Southwest attorneys … would likely suffer a violation of their constitutional rights.”

== Memberships ==
He has been a member of the Federalist Society since 2005.

Legal offices
Preceded by Sidney A. Fitzwater	Judge of the United States District Court for the Northern District of Texas; 2019–present	Incumbent
