= Kasdin Mitchell =

American judge (born 1985)

Kasdin Miller Mitchell

Judge of the United States District Court for the Northern District of Texas
- Incumbent
- Assumed office October 2, 2026
- Appointed by: Donald Trump
- Preceded by: Barbara M. Lynn

Personal details
- Born: Kasdin Elizabeth Miller; 1985 (age 40–41) Anniston, Alabama, U.S.
- Education: Yale University (BA, JD)

Kasdin Miller Mitchell (née Miller; born 1985) is an American judge who serves as a United States district judge of the United States District Court for the Northern District of Texas since 2026. From 2017 to 2026, she worked at the law firm of Kirkland & Ellis, becoming partner in 2018.

== Education ==
Mitchell was born Kasdin Elizabeth Miller in 1985 in Anniston, Alabama. She received her Bachelor of Arts degree in 2007 from Yale University and her Juris Doctor in 2012 from Yale Law School. She served as a law clerk for Judge William H. Pryor Jr. of the United States Court of Appeals for the Eleventh Circuit and Justice Clarence Thomas of the Supreme Court of the United States.

== Career ==
Mitchell worked as the assistant press secretary to First Lady Laura Bush. She also served in the Office of Fossil Energy at the U.S. Department of Energy, where she worked on issues related to oil, gas and coal. Mitchell was a partner at the law firm of Kirkland & Ellis at its Dallas office.

=== Federal judicial service ===
On May 11, 2026, President Donald Trump announced his intention to nominate Mitchell to an undesignated seat on the United States District Court for the Northern District of Texas. On May 12, 2026, Trump nominated Mitchell to the seat on the Northern District of Texas vacated by Judge Barbara M. Lynn. On July 16, 2026, her nomination was reported to the Senate by a 11–10 party-line vote. On September 17, 2026, her nomination was confirmed by a 49–45 vote. She received her judicial commission on October 2, 2026.

== Personal ==
Mitchell married David Welles Mitchell on October 11, 2014. They reside in Dallas, Texas.

Legal offices
Preceded by Barbara M. Lynn	Judge of the United States District Court for the Northern District of Texas; 2026–present	Incumbent
