= William Estes =

William Estes may refer to:

- William Kaye Estes (born 1919), American scientist
- William Lee Estes (1870–1930), U.S. federal judge
- Will Estes (born 1978), American actor
- William R. Estes (born 1852) Minnesota politician
