= Patrick Higginbotham =

American judge (born 1938)

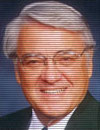

Senior Judge of the United States Court of Appeals for the Fifth Circuit
- Incumbent
- Assumed office August 28, 2006

Judge of the United States Court of Appeals for the Fifth Circuit
- In office July 30, 1982 – August 28, 2006
- Appointed by: Ronald Reagan
- Preceded by: Reynaldo Guerra Garza
- Succeeded by: Jennifer Walker Elrod

Judge of the United States District Court for the Northern District of Texas
- In office December 12, 1975 – August 3, 1982
- Appointed by: Gerald Ford
- Preceded by: Sarah T. Hughes
- Succeeded by: A. Joe Fish

Personal details
- Born: Patrick Errol Higginbotham; December 16, 1938 (age 87) McCalla, Alabama, U.S.
- Spouse: Elizabeth O'Neal (died 2017)
- Children: 2
- Education: University of Alabama (BA, LLB)

Patrick Errol Higginbotham (born December 16, 1938) is an American judge and lawyer who serves as a senior United States circuit judge of the United States Court of Appeals for the Fifth Circuit.

== Background and education ==
Higginbotham was born in McCalla, Alabama, to George and Ann Higginbotham (née Tumlin). The youngest of three, Higginbotham showed academic promise early in life.

Higginbotham grew up in a poor family in rural Alabama. After his father and mother separated, he followed his mother to Bessemer, Alabama. With money scarce, the family had to find alternative methods to finance college. Higginbotham's brother did this by joining the United States Navy to get a GI Bill. Patrick Higginbotham himself, however, soon became interested in tennis from the ages of 11 or 12, a result of his mother bringing him along to Montevallo, Alabama while attending its university for women. Trading a knife for a racket, he would play through high school, becoming the top player in the 18 and under rankings in the state, earning him a scholarship.

Higginbotham received a Bachelor of Arts degree from the University of Alabama in 1960, attending on a tennis scholarship offered to him by then-Athletic-Director Paul "Bear" Bryant and serving as the team captain. He finished college and law school in just five years and received in 1961 a Bachelor of Laws from the University of Alabama School of Law at Tuscaloosa, where he also met Elizabeth, his eventual wife of 52 years.

== Career ==
He was in the United States Air Force, JAG Corps from 1961 to 1964, an experience that Higginbotham would consider to be a turning point in his life. It was also during this time, where he would marry his wife. He then joined Coke & Coke in Dallas, Texas from 1964 to 1975, where he primarily worked in antitrust litigation. He was an adjunct professor of constitutional law at the Southern Methodist University School of Law in 1976.

== Federal judicial service ==
=== District court ===
Higginbotham was nominated by President Gerald Ford on December 2, 1975, to a seat on the United States District Court for the Northern District of Texas vacated by Judge Sarah T. Hughes. He was confirmed by the United States Senate on December 12, 1975, and received commission the same day. At the time he was appointed to the District Court, he was the youngest sitting judge in the country. His service was terminated on August 3, 1982, due to elevation to the Fifth Circuit. He was succeeded by Judge Joe Fish.

=== Appellate court ===
Higginbotham was nominated by President Ronald Reagan on July 1, 1982, to a seat on the United States Court of Appeals for the Fifth Circuit vacated by Judge Reynaldo Guerra Garza. He was unanimously confirmed by the Senate on July 27, 1982, and received commission on July 30, 1982. In 2005, he moved his chambers from Dallas, Texas to Austin, Texas. He assumed senior status on August 28, 2006.

== Supreme Court consideration ==
In 1986, when the nomination of Robert Bork to the Supreme Court of the United States was flailing, Higginbotham was widely considered the leading replacement candidate. After Senators Lloyd Bentsen and Dennis DeConcini came out in support of his nomination, the Reagan administration, unwilling to allow the senators to both prevent the appointment of Bork and dictate the next nominee, declined to nominate Higginbotham. The nomination eventually went to Ninth Circuit Judge Anthony Kennedy.

== Other service ==
For many years, Higginbotham was a faculty member at the Federal Judicial Center and, as an appointee of Chief Justice William Rehnquist, the chairman of the Advisory Committee on Civil Rules. He served as president of the American Inns of Court Foundation, and in 1996 the Dallas chapter of that organization renamed itself after him. He has been a leading proponent and former chairman of The Center for American and International Law, a Dallas-based organization which aims to train foreign and domestic lawyers and police officers, a Fellow of the American Bar Association, chairman of its Appellate Judges Conference, member of the Board of Editors of the ABA Journal, and advisor to the National Center for State Courts on its study of habeas corpus. He is also a lifetime member of the American Law Institute and a member of the Board of Overseers, Institute of Civil Justice, RAND Corporation.

As a professor of constitutional law, Higginbotham taught at the Southern Methodist University School of Law. He also taught at the University of Alabama School of Law during the fall semesters of 1995, 1997, and 1999, as well as the University of Texas School of Law in 1998, Texas Tech University School of Law during the spring of 1999, and the St. Marie's School of Law.

== Speeches and writings ==
Higginbotham has published a number of articles in law reviews and newspapers. He is also a frequent speaker on various legal topics, particularly the death penalty and the decline of jury trials, having lectured at places including the Universities of Alabama, Chicago, St. Mary's, Texas, Texas Tech, Columbia, Duke, and Penn, as well as Case Western, Northwestern, Utah, Loyola, Hofstra, the National Science Foundation, The American College of Trial Lawyers and the National Institute of Trial Advocacy.

== Personal life ==
Higginbotham married Elizabeth O'Neal in August 1961. They were married until her death from Alzheimer's disease on June 10, 2017, at the age of 78. They had two daughters.

== Notable opinions ==
- In In re LTV Securities Litigation, 88 F.R.D. 134 (N.D. Tex. 1980), Higginbotham formulated one of the earliest versions of the "fraud on the market" theory of loss causation, using language later quoted by the Supreme Court when it adopted the theory, see Basic, Inc. v. Levinson, 485 U.S. 224, 244 (1988).
- In Schultea v. Wood, 47 F.3d 1427 (5th Cir. 1995) (en banc), Higginbotham allowed under Rule 7 notice pleading in potential qualified immunity cases but required, in reply to an allegation of qualified immunity, more detailed pleading, a tack later approved by the Supreme Court.
- In Flores v. City of Boerne, 73 F.3d 1352 (5th Cir. 1996), Higginbotham upheld the Religious Freedom Restoration Act against the claim that the Act exceeded Congress's powers under the Fourteenth Amendment. The Supreme Court later reversed the decision.
- In Doe v. Beaumont Independent School District, 240 F.3d 462 (5th Cir. 2001) (en banc), Higginbotham found that public school students and their parents had standing to challenge district's "Clergy in Schools" volunteer counseling program and that facts issues required reversal of summary judgment to defendants.
- In Van Orden v. Perry, 351 F.3d 173 (5th Cir. 2003), Higginbotham upheld against an Establishment Clause challenge a Ten Commandments display on the Texas State Capitol, concluding that its secular history and purpose rendered it constitutional. The Supreme Court later affirmed.
- Between 2000 and 2006, Higginbotham, sitting as the Circuit Judge along with two district judges in a Voting Rights Act three-judge panel, twice changed Texas's Congressional districts. His later effort, which struck a balance between competing interests while hewing closely to the Texas legislature's intent, was widely hailed.
- In June Medical Services v. Russo, 30 F.3d 397 (5th Cir. 2018), Higginbotham dissented in a case upholding Louisiana's Act 620, which requires physicians performing abortions to have active admitting privileges at a hospital within thirty miles of a clinic. Higginbotham criticized the majority for reviewing the statute de novo, as a district court would, saying, "Appellate judges are not the triers of fact. It is apparent that when abortion comes on stage it shadows the role of settled judicial rules."
- In Barnes v. Felix, 91 F.4th 393 (5th Cir. 2024), Higginbotham wrote the (majority and) concurring opinion later cited by the Supreme Court in its reversal (US 91 F.4th 393) stating that the "moment of threat" rule formerly used by the Fifth Circuit in its excessive-force inquiry (whether officers or other persons were in danger at moment of threat that resulted in officers' use of deadly force) should be vacated, and that the Court should adopt the "totality of the circumstances" rule. Higginbotham's concurring opinion pointed out judicial shortcomings: "A routine traffic stop has again ended in the death of an unarmed black man, and again we cloak a police officer with qualified immunity, shielding his liability." The Supreme Court adopted the "totality of the circumstances" rule, as recommended by Higginbotham.

== Awards and recognition ==
- The 100 Most Powerful People For the 80's (Next Magazine) - 1981
- Daniel J. Meador Outstanding Alumnus Award (University of Alabama) - 1986
- Samuel E. Gates Litigation Award (American College of Trial Lawyers) - 1997
- A. Sherman Christensen Award (American Inns of Court) - 2002
- Jurist of the Year Award (Texas Chapters of the American Board of Trial Advocates) - 2006
- Lewis F. Powell, Jr. Award for Professionalism and Ethics at a Celebration of Excellence (presented by Justice Alito in the United States Supreme Court) - 2008
- Chief Justice John Marshall Award for Lifetime achievement from the JAG Association - 2010
- St. Thomas More Award (St. Mary's School of Law, San Antonio, Texas) - 2011
- Chief Justice Jack Pope Professionalism and Integrity Award (Texas Center for Legal Ethics) - 2013

== See also ==
- George H. W. Bush Supreme Court candidates
- List of United States federal judges by longevity of service

Legal offices
Preceded by Sarah T. Hughes	Judge of the United States District Court for the Northern District of Texas; 1975–1982	Succeeded by A. Joe Fish
Preceded by Reynaldo Guerra Garza	Judge of the United States Court of Appeals for the Fifth Circuit; 1982–2006	Succeeded by Jennifer Walker Elrod
