= Robert B. Maloney =

American judge (born 1933)

Senior Judge of the United States District Court for the Northern District of Texas
- Incumbent
- Assumed office August 31, 2000

Judge of the United States District Court for the Northern District of Texas
- In office October 17, 1985 – August 31, 2000
- Appointed by: Ronald Reagan
- Preceded by: Seat established by 98 Stat. 333
- Succeeded by: David C. Godbey

Personal details
- Born: January 31, 1933 (age 93) Dallas, Texas, U.S.
- Relatives: Dorothy Malone (sister)
- Education: Southern Methodist University (BBA, JD)

Robert B. Maloney (born January 31, 1933) is an inactive senior United States district judge of the United States District Court for the Northern District of Texas.

== Education and career ==
Born in Dallas, Maloney received a Bachelor of Business Administration from Southern Methodist University in 1956 and a Juris Doctor from Southern Methodist University School of Law in 1960. He was an assistant district attorney of Dallas County, Texas, from 1961 to 1962. He was in private practice in Dallas from 1962 to 1984. He was a Texas state representative from 1973 to 1982. He was an associate justice of the Court of Appeals for the Fifth Judicial Circuit in Dallas, from 1983 to 1985. Maloney is also the brother of the late Academy Award-winning actress Dorothy Malone.

=== Federal judicial service ===
Maloney was nominated by President Ronald Reagan on July 23, 1985, to the United States District Court for the Northern District of Texas, to a new seat created by 98 Stat. 333. He was confirmed by the United States Senate on October 16, 1985, and received his commission on October 17, 1985. He assumed senior status on August 31, 2000. Maloney is currently in inactive senior status, meaning that he does not hear cases nor participate in the business of the court.

== Sources ==
Legal offices
Preceded by Seat established by 98 Stat. 333	Judge of the United States District Court for the Northern District of Texas; 1985–2000	Succeeded by David C. Godbey
