= A. Joe Fish =

American judge (born 1942)

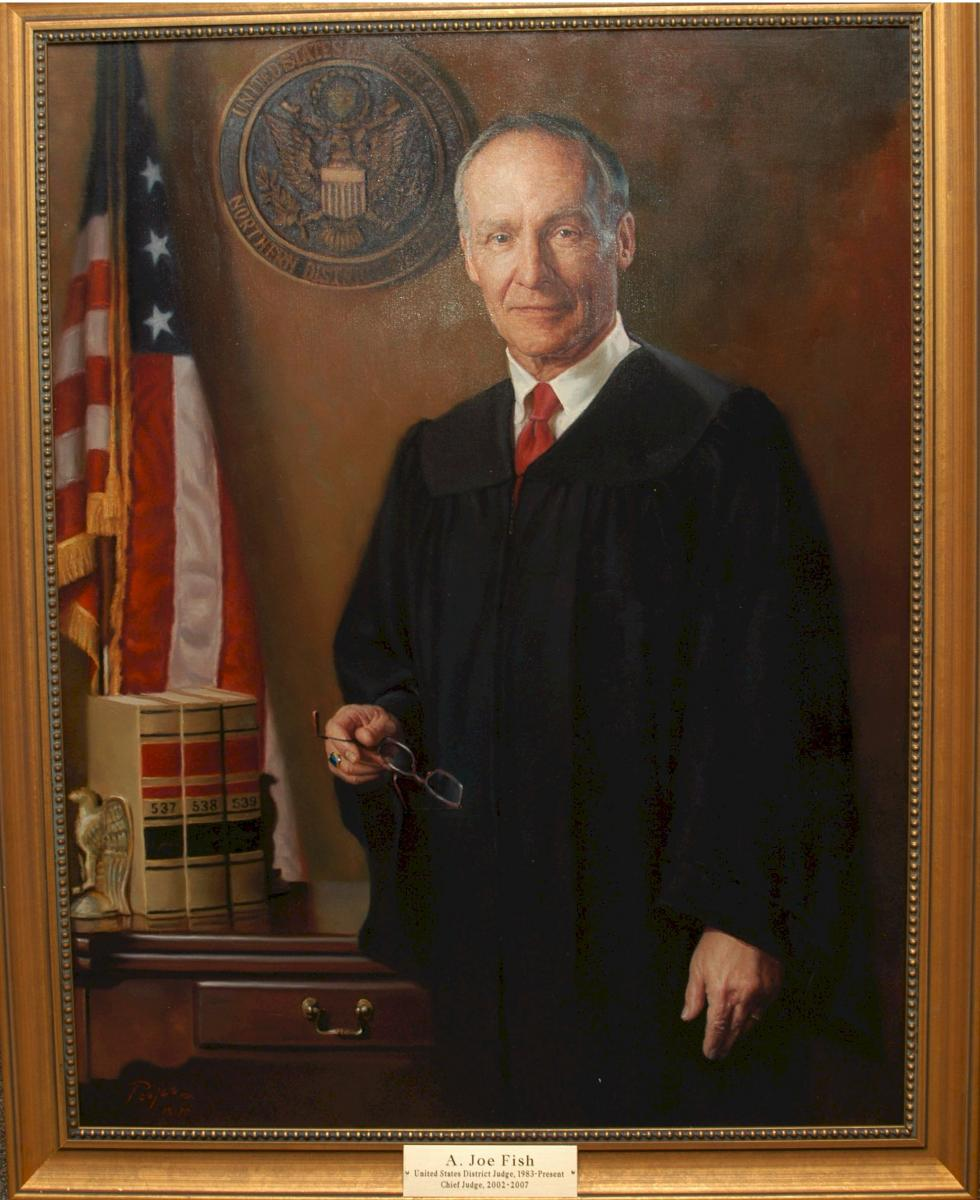

Senior Judge of the United States District Court for the Northern District of Texas
- Incumbent
- Assumed office November 12, 2007

Chief Judge of the United States District Court for the Northern District of Texas
- In office 2002–2007
- Preceded by: Jerry Buchmeyer
- Succeeded by: Sidney A. Fitzwater

Judge of the United States District Court for the Northern District of Texas
- In office February 24, 1983 – November 12, 2007
- Appointed by: Ronald Reagan
- Preceded by: Patrick Higginbotham
- Succeeded by: Reed O'Connor

Personal details
- Born: Allen Joe Fish; November 12, 1942 (age 83) Los Angeles, California, U.S.
- Education: Yale University (BA, LLB)

Allen Joe Fish (born November 12, 1942) is a senior United States district judge of the United States District Court for the Northern District of Texas in Dallas.

== Education and career ==
Fish was born in Los Angeles. He received his Bachelor of Arts degree from Yale University in 1965 and his Bachelor of Laws from Yale Law School in 1968. He was a Sergeant in the United States Army Reserve from 1968 to 1974, and was in private practice in Dallas, Texas, from 1968 to 1980. In 1980 he was elected to the 95th Judicial District Court of Dallas County. From 1981 to 1983 he was a judge on the Fifth District of the Texas Court of Appeals in Dallas.

=== Federal judicial service ===
On January 31, 1983, Fish was nominated by President Ronald Reagan to a seat on the United States District Court for the Northern District of Texas vacated by Judge Patrick Higginbotham. Fish was confirmed by the United States Senate less than a month later, on February 23, 1983, and received his commission the following day. He served as Chief Judge of the district from 2002 to 2007, assuming senior status on November 12, 2007.

Legal offices
Preceded by Patrick Higginbotham	Judge of the United States District Court for the Northern District of Texas; 1983–2007	Succeeded by Reed O'Connor
Preceded by Jerry Buchmeyer	Chief Judge of the United States District Court for the Northern District of Texas; 2002–2007	Succeeded by Sidney A. Fitzwater
