= Sidney A. Fitzwater =

American judge (born 1953)

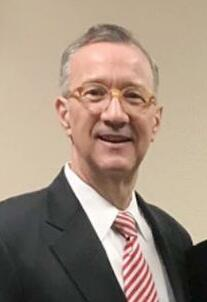

Senior Judge of the United States District Court for the Northern District of Texas
- Incumbent
- Assumed office September 22, 2018

Chief Judge of the United States District Court for the Northern District of Texas
- In office 2007–2014
- Preceded by: A. Joe Fish
- Succeeded by: Jorge Antonio Solis

Judge of the United States District Court for the Northern District of Texas
- In office March 19, 1986 – September 22, 2018
- Appointed by: Ronald Reagan
- Preceded by: Robert Madden Hill
- Succeeded by: Brantley Starr

Personal details
- Born: Sidney Allen Fitzwater; September 22, 1953 (age 72) Olney, Maryland, U.S.
- Education: Baylor University (BA, JD)

Sidney Allen Fitzwater (born September 22, 1953) is a senior United States district judge of the United States District Court for the Northern District of Texas in Dallas, Texas.

== Education and career ==
Born in Olney, Maryland, Fitzwater earned his Bachelor of Arts degree from Baylor University, and his Juris Doctor from Baylor Law School in 1976, where he was Associate Editor of the Baylor Law Review. Fitzwater worked in private legal practice in Houston, Texas from 1976 until 1978 and in private legal practice in Dallas, Texas from 1978 until 1982. He later served as a state district judge on the 298th Judicial District in Dallas from 1982 to 1986.

=== Federal judicial service ===
On January 29, 1986, Fitzwater was nominated by President Ronald Reagan to a seat on the United States District Court for the Northern District of Texas vacated by Judge Robert Madden Hill. Fitzwater's nomination sparked controversy in part because of allegations raised at his confirmation hearing about alleged voter intimidation in African-American neighborhoods in south Dallas during the unsuccessful 1982 re-election campaign of Texas Governor Bill Clements.

He addressed the allegations at his confirmation hearing by apologizing and by asserting that he was not aware that he was asked to place signs—reading "You Can Be Imprisoned" and giving vague descriptions of campaign violations—only in black neighborhoods in south Dallas. Fitzwater testified that he thought he was participating in an anti-vote-fraud effort, and he noted that he later was dropped from a federal lawsuit by minority groups. Fitzwater also noted that the lawsuit later was dismissed. At his second hearing in February 1986, Fitzwater told the United States Senate Committee on the Judiciary that he would not participate in such signposting again. "I had no personal intent, nor was I attempting to intimidate minority voters", Fitzwater told Senator Biden (D-DE).

Despite this controversy, the Senate Judiciary Committee voted 10–5 on February 27, 1986, to refer Fitzwater's nomination to the full Senate. The United States Senate confirmed Fitzwater by a 52–42 vote on March 18, 1986. He received his commission on March 19, 1986. At age 32, he was one of the youngest lawyers ever appointed to the federal bench. He served as Chief Judge from 2007 to 2014. He assumed senior status on September 22, 2018.

=== Expired nomination to federal court of appeals ===
On January 24, 1992, President George H. W. Bush nominated Fitzwater to the United States Court of Appeals for the Fifth Circuit. However, with the Senate Judiciary Committee controlled by Democrats, Fitzwater's nomination languished, and he never received a hearing before Bush's presidency ended. President Bill Clinton chose not to renominate Fitzwater to the Fifth Circuit, nominating Fortunato Benavides instead.

=== Notable cases ===
Fitzwater presided over the SEC's civil suit against Mark Cuban for insider trading. Fitzwater granted Cuban's motion to dismiss but the ruling was reversed by the Fifth Circuit.

== See also ==
- George H.W. Bush judicial appointment controversies
- List of United States federal judges by longevity of service

Legal offices
| Preceded by Robert Madden Hill | Judge of the United States District Court for the Northern District of Texas; 1986–2018 | Succeeded by Brantley Starr |
| Preceded by A. Joe Fish | Chief Judge of the United States District Court for the Northern District of Texas; 2007–2014 | Succeeded by Jorge Antonio Solis |
