= Jane J. Boyle =

American judge (born 1954)

Jane Jackson Boyle

Senior Judge of the United States District Court for the Northern District of Texas
- Incumbent
- Assumed office October 1, 2025

Judge of the United States District Court for the Northern District of Texas
- In office June 29, 2004 – October 1, 2025
- Appointed by: George W. Bush
- Preceded by: Jerry Buchmeyer
- Succeeded by: vacant

Magistrate Judge of the United States District Court for the Northern District of Texas
- In office 1990–2002

Personal details
- Born: Jane Ellen Jackson; December 15, 1954 (age 71) Sharon, Pennsylvania, U.S.
- Education: University of Texas (BS); Southern Methodist University (JD)

Jane Ellen Jackson Boyle (born December 15, 1954) is a senior United States district judge of the United States District Court for the Northern District of Texas.

== Early life and education ==
Born in Sharon, Pennsylvania, Boyle graduated from the University of Texas with her Bachelor of Science degree in 1977 and later from Dedman School of Law at Southern Methodist University with a Juris Doctor in 1981.

== Career ==
Boyle was a misdemeanor and felony prosecutor in the Dallas County District Attorney's Office from 1981 to 1985 and was a chief felony prosecutor from 1985 to 1987. Boyle was an assistant United States attorney for the U.S. Attorney's Office, Northern District of Texas from 1987 to 1990. She served as a United States magistrate judge of the Northern District of Texas from 1990 to 2002. In 2002, Boyle became the United States Attorney for the Northern District of Texas until her appointment as a federal judge in 2004.

=== Federal judicial service ===
On November 24, 2003, Boyle was nominated to serve as a United States district judge of the United States District Court for the Northern District of Texas by President George W. Bush, to a seat vacated by Judge Jerry Buchmeyer. Boyle was confirmed by the Senate on June 17, 2004 by a 99–0 vote and received her commission on June 29, 2004.

On August 28, 2025, Boyle announced that she was taking Senior Status effective October 1, 2025.

== Sources ==
Legal offices
Preceded by Jerry Buchmeyer	Judge of the United States District Court for the Northern District of Texas; 2004–2025	Vacant
