= Joe Ewing Estes =

American judge (1903–1989)

Senior Judge of the United States District Court for the Northern District of Texas
- In office July 1, 1972 – October 24, 1989

Chief Judge of the United States District Court for the Northern District of Texas
- In office 1959–1972
- Preceded by: Joseph Brannon Dooley
- Succeeded by: Leo Brewster

Judge of the United States District Court for the Northern District of Texas
- In office August 1, 1955 – July 1, 1972
- Appointed by: Dwight D. Eisenhower
- Preceded by: William H. Atwell
- Succeeded by: Eldon Brooks Mahon

Personal details
- Born: Joe Ewing Estes; October 24, 1903 Commerce, Texas, U.S.
- Died: October 24, 1989 (aged 86)
- Education: University of Texas at Austin (LLB)

Joe Ewing Estes (October 24, 1903 – October 24, 1989) was a United States district judge of the United States District Court for the Northern District of Texas.

== Education and career ==
Born in Commerce, Texas, Estes received a Bachelor of Laws from the University of Texas School of Law in 1927. He was in private practice in Commerce from 1928 to 1930, and then in Fort Worth, Texas until 1942. He served in the United States Naval Reserve during World War II, from 1942 to 1945, achieving the rank of Lieutenant. He thereafter returned to private practice, in Dallas, Texas from 1946 to 1955.

== Federal judicial service ==
On July 18, 1955, Estes was nominated by President Dwight D. Eisenhower to a seat on the United States District Court for the Northern District of Texas vacated by Judge William H. Atwell. Estes was confirmed by the United States Senate on July 28, 1955, and received his commission on August 1, 1955. He served as Chief Judge from 1959 to 1972 and as a member of the Judicial Conference of the United States from 1969 to 1971. He assumed senior status on July 1, 1972. He served as a Judge of the Temporary Emergency Court of Appeals from 1972 to 1987. He remained in senior status until his death on October 24, 1989, his 86th birthday.

== Sources ==
Legal offices
Preceded by William H. Atwell	Judge of the United States District Court for the Northern District of Texas; 1955–1972	Succeeded by Eldon Brooks Mahon
Preceded by Joseph Brannon Dooley	Chief Judge of the United States District Court for the Northern District of Texas; 1959–1972	Succeeded by Leo Brewster
