= David C. Godbey =

American judge (born 1957)

Senior Judge of the United States District Court for the Northern District of Texas
- Incumbent
- Assumed office September 17, 2025

Chief Judge of the United States District Court for the Northern District of Texas
- In office September 6, 2022 – August 18, 2025
- Preceded by: Barbara M. Lynn
- Succeeded by: Reed O'Connor

Judge of the United States District Court for the Northern District of Texas
- In office August 2, 2002 – September 17, 2025
- Appointed by: George W. Bush
- Preceded by: Robert B. Maloney
- Succeeded by: vacant

Personal details
- Born: David Charles Godbey; September 17, 1957 (age 68) Temple, Texas, U.S.
- Education: Southern Methodist University (BS, BSEE); Harvard University (JD)

David Charles Godbey (born September 17, 1957) is a senior United States district judge of the United States District Court for the Northern District of Texas.

== Education and career ==
Godbey was born in Temple, Texas. He received a Bachelor of Science degree and Bachelor of Science in Electrical Engineering degree from Southern Methodist University in 1978 and a Juris Doctor from Harvard Law School in 1982. He was a law clerk to Judge Irving Loeb Goldberg of the United States Court of Appeals for the Fifth Circuit from 1982 to 1983. He was in private practice in Dallas from 1983 to 1994. He was a judge on the 160th District Court, State of Texas from 1994 to 2002.

=== Federal judicial service ===
Godbey was nominated by President George W. Bush on January 23, 2002, to a seat vacated by Judge Robert B. Maloney. He was confirmed by the United States Senate on August 1, 2002, and received his commission on August 2, 2002. He sits in Dallas. He became chief judge on September 6, 2022. He assumed senior status on September 17, 2025.

== Sources ==
- John Council, "A Black Belt in a Black Robe", Texas Lawyer, July 27, 2009 (registration required)

Legal offices
Preceded by Robert B. Maloney	Judge of the United States District Court for the Northern District of Texas; 2002–2025	Vacant
Preceded by Barbara M. Lynn	Judge of the United States District Court for the Northern District of Texas; 2022–2025	Succeeded by Reed O'Connor
