= William McLaughlin Taylor Jr. =

American judge

Senior Judge of the United States District Court for the Northern District of Texas
- In office February 7, 1979 – June 17, 1985

Chief Judge of the United States District Court for the Northern District of Texas
- In office 1973–1977
- Preceded by: Leo Brewster
- Succeeded by: Halbert Owen Woodward

Judge of the United States District Court for the Northern District of Texas
- In office July 22, 1966 – February 7, 1979
- Appointed by: Lyndon B. Johnson
- Preceded by: Thomas Whitfield Davidson
- Succeeded by: Jerry Buchmeyer

Personal details
- Born: William McLaughlin Taylor Jr. February 7, 1909 Denton, Texas, U.S.
- Died: June 17, 1985 (aged 76)
- Education: Southern Methodist University School of Law (LL.B.)

William McLaughlin Taylor Jr. (February 7, 1909 – June 17, 1985) was a United States district judge of the United States District Court for the Northern District of Texas.

== Education and career ==
Born in Denton, Texas, Taylor's father, William M. Taylor, was an attorney who would go on to serve on the Supreme Court of Texas. Taylor received a Bachelor of Laws from Southern Methodist University School of Law in 1932. He was in private practice from 1932 to 1933, and was then an assistant district attorney of the Civil Department of the State of Texas from 1933 to 1936, and an assistant city attorney from 1936 to 1939. He returned to private practice in Dallas, Texas from 1939 to 1946. He was a Reserve Captain in the United States Marine Corps during World War II, from 1944 to 1945, again returning to private practice in Dallas from 1946 to 1949. He was a judge of the 134th District Court of Dallas County, Texas from 1949 to 1953. He was again in private practice in Dallas from 1953 to 1966.

== Federal judicial service ==
On June 28, 1966, Taylor was nominated by President Lyndon B. Johnson to a seat on the United States District Court for the Northern District of Texas vacated by Judge Thomas Whitfield Davidson. Taylor was confirmed by the United States Senate on July 22, 1966, and received his commission the same day. He served as Chief Judge from 1973 to 1977, assuming senior status on February 7, 1979, and serving in that capacity until his death on June 17, 1985.

Legal offices
Preceded by Thomas Whitfield Davidson	Judge of the United States District Court for the Northern District of Texas; 1966–1979	Succeeded by Jerry Buchmeyer
Preceded by Leo Brewster	Chief Judge of the United States District Court for the Northern District of Texas; 1973–1977	Succeeded by Halbert Owen Woodward
