= List of Yale Law School alumni =

This is a list of notable alumni of Yale Law School, the law school of the American Yale University, located in New Haven, Connecticut. (For a list of notable Yale University graduates, see the list of Yale University people.) Records are kept by the Association of Yale Alumni.

All degrees listed below are LL.B. (the primary professional degree in law conferred by Yale Law School until 1971) or J.D. (the primary professional degree in law conferred since 1971), unless noted otherwise.

Yale Law's three–year J.D. (LL.B., before 1971) program enrolls an incoming class of approximately 200 students, one of the smallest incoming class sizes of all top law schools.

== Academia ==
=== University presidents ===
- Nicholas Allard (1979), president and dean of Brooklyn Law School
- Michelle Anderson (born 1967), president of Brooklyn College
- Nancy Y. Bekavac (1973), president of Scripps College
- Alfred Benjamin Butts (1930), chancellor of the University of Mississippi
- Gerhard Casper (LL.M. 1962), president of Stanford University
- Hiram Chodosh (1990), president of Claremont McKenna College
- Ronald J. Daniels (1988), president of Johns Hopkins University
- Nora Demleitner (1992), president of St. John's College - Annapolis
- JoAnne A. Epps (1976), provost, Temple University
- William R. Greiner, president of the University at Buffalo
- Ira Michael Heyman (1956), chancellor of the University of California, Berkeley
- Robert Hutchins (1925), president and chancellor of the University of Chicago
- Joseph S. Iseman (1941), acting president of Bennington College
- Thomas H. Jackson (1975), president of University of Rochester
- Marvin Krislov (1988), president of Oberlin College
- Ted Landsmark (1973), president of the Boston Architectural College
- Frederick M. Lawrence (1980), president of Brandeis University
- Edward H. Levi (1938), president of the University of Chicago
- Wallace Loh, president of the University of Maryland, College Park
- Linda Lorimer, vice president of Yale University; president of Randolph-Macon Woman's College
- Jennifer Mnookin (1995), president of Columbia University, chancellor of the University of Wisconsin-Madison, and dean of UCLA School of Law
- Cyrus Northrop, president of the University of Minnesota
- Russell K. Osgood (1974), president of Grinnell College, dean of Cornell Law School, and dean of Washington University School of Law
- Ariel Porat (1990), president of Tel Aviv University
- Robert Prichard (LL.M. 1976), president of the University of Toronto
- Wendell Pritchett, chancellor of Rutgers University–Camden, provost of the University of Pennsylvania
- Michael H. Schill (1984), president of the University of Oregon
- Clayton Spencer (1985), president of Bates College
- Stephen Joel Trachtenberg (1962), president of George Washington University
- Louis Vogel (LL.M. 1982), president of Panthéon-Assas University
- Joan Wexler, president and dean of Brooklyn Law School

=== Law school deans ===
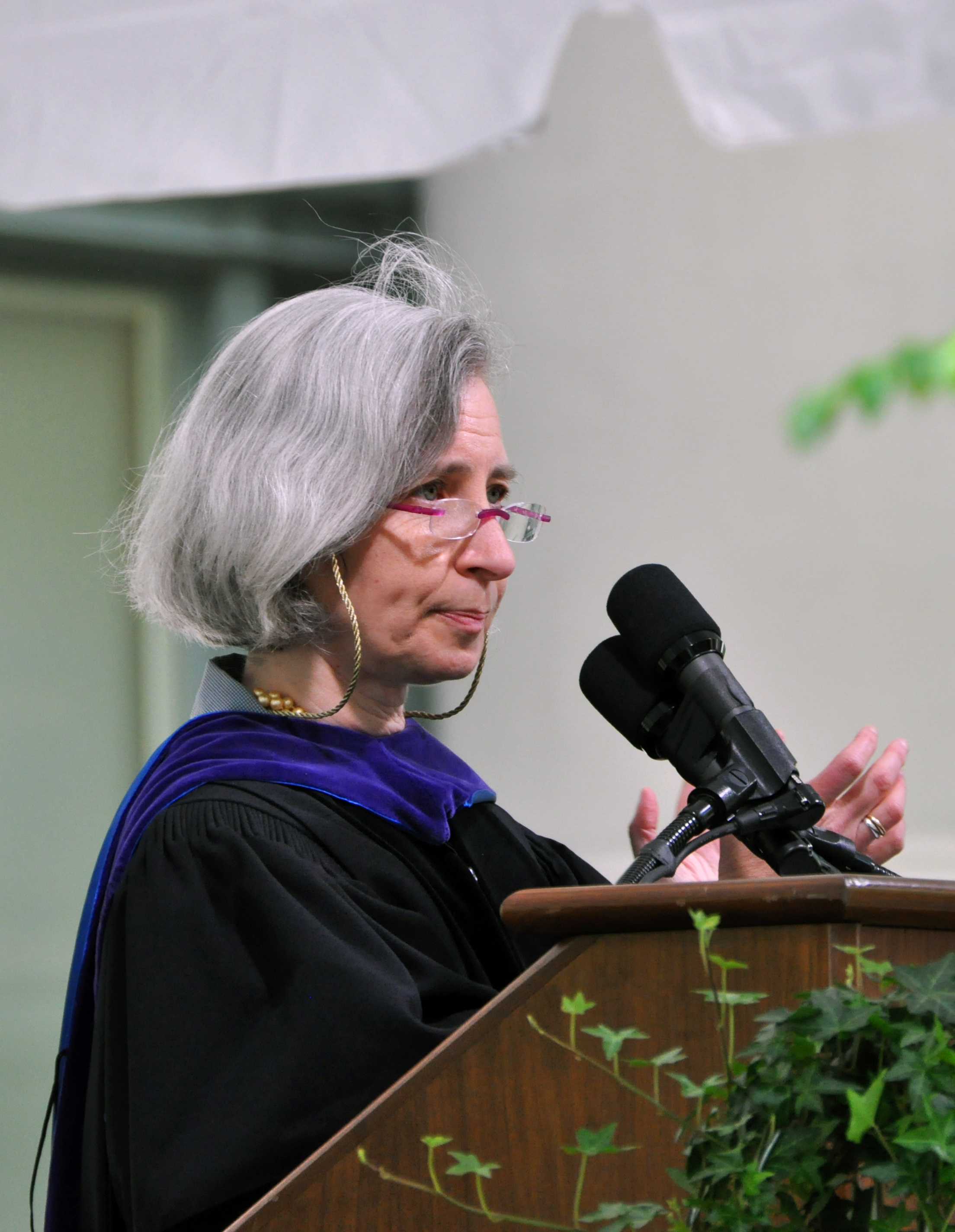
Dean of Harvard Law School Martha Minow '79

- T. Alexander Aleinikoff (1977), dean of Georgetown University Law Center
- Mark C. Alexander, dean of Villanova University Charles Widger School of Law
- Michelle Anderson (1994), dean of City University of New York Law School
- Evan Caminker (1986), dean of the University of Michigan Law School
- Nora Demleitner (1992), dean of the Washington and Lee University School of Law
- John Hart Ely (1963), dean of Stanford Law School
- JoAnne A. Epps (1976), dean of Temple Law School
- Sarah Harding, dean of Schulich School of Law
- Robert Klonoff (1979), dean of Lewis & Clark Law School
- Anthony T. Kronman (1975), dean of Yale Law School
- Saul Levmore (1980), dean of the University of Chicago Law School
- Paul Mahoney (1984), dean of the University of Virginia School of Law
- Earl F. Martin (LL.M. 1996), dean of Gonzaga University School of Law
- Michael Meltsner (JD 1960), dean of Northeastern University School of Law
- Martha Minow (1979), dean of Harvard Law School
- Russell D. Niles (LL.M. 1931), dean of New York University School of Law
- Louis H. Pollak (1943), dean of Yale Law School and the University of Pennsylvania Law School
- Robert Post (1977), dean of Yale Law School
- Norman Redlich (1950), dean of New York University School of Law
- Richard Revesz (1983), dean of New York University School of Law
- Cristina M. Rodríguez (2000), dean of Yale Law School
- Michael H. Schill (1984), dean of UCLA Law School and University of Chicago Law School
- David Schizer (1993), dean of Columbia Law School
- Aviam Soifer (1972), dean of the William S. Richardson School of Law
- William Treanor (1985), dean of Georgetown University Law Center
- Frans Vanistendael (LL.M.), dean of Katholieke Universiteit Leuven
- Kevin K. Washburn (1993), dean of the University of New Mexico School of Law

=== Legal scholars ===
==== Constitutional law ====
- Bruce Ackerman (1967), professor at Yale Law School and author of Social justice in the Liberal State
- Akhil Amar (1984), professor at Yale Law School
- Vikram Amar (1988), professor at the University of California Davis School of Law
- C. Edwin Baker, professor at the University of Pennsylvania Law School
- Charles Black, professor at Yale Law School
- Philip Bobbitt (1975), professor at Columbia Law School and author of The Shield of Achilles: War, Peace, and the Course of History
- William Eskridge (1978), professor at Yale Law School
- Noah Feldman (1997), professor at Harvard Law School; scholar on Islamic law
- Paul W. Kahn (1980), professor at Yale Law School
- Charles A. Reich (1952), professor at Yale Law School
- Kermit Roosevelt III (1997), professor at the University of Pennsylvania Law School
- Reva Siegel (1986), professor at Yale Law School
- Carol M. Swain (M.S.L. Law), professor of political science and law at Vanderbilt University
- Charles Alan Wright (1949), professor at University of Texas School of Law
- Kenji Yoshino (1996), professor at New York University School of Law
- Johannes Reich (1975), professor at the University of Zurich

==== Criminal law ====
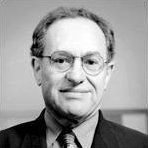
Legal scholar Alan Dershowitz '62

- Barbara Babcock (1963), professor at Stanford Law School
- Alan Dershowitz (1962), professor at Harvard Law School
- Don Kates, professor at Saint Louis University School of Law
- Mark Osler (1990), professor at the University of St. Thomas School of Law, clemency advocate, and critic of capital punishment

==== Civil and human rights law ====
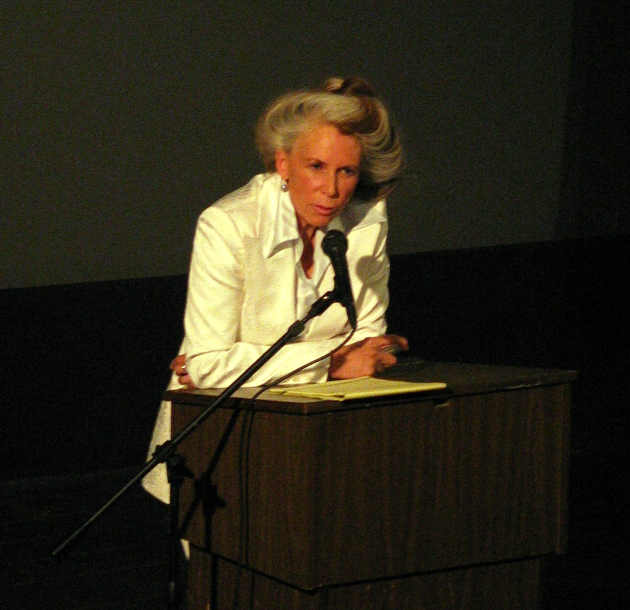
Legal scholar Catharine MacKinnon '77

- David D. Cole (1984), professor at Georgetown University Law Center
- Lani Guinier (1974), professor at Harvard Law School; the first tenured female African–American professor at Harvard Law School
- Christof Heyns (LL.M.), professor at the Institute for International and Comparative Law in Africa
- Randall Kennedy (1982), professor at Harvard Law School
- Andrew Koppelman (1989), professor at Northwestern University
- Catharine MacKinnon (1977), professor at the University of Michigan Law School
- Tobias Barrington Wolff (1997), professor at the University of Pennsylvania Law School

==== Intellectual property ====
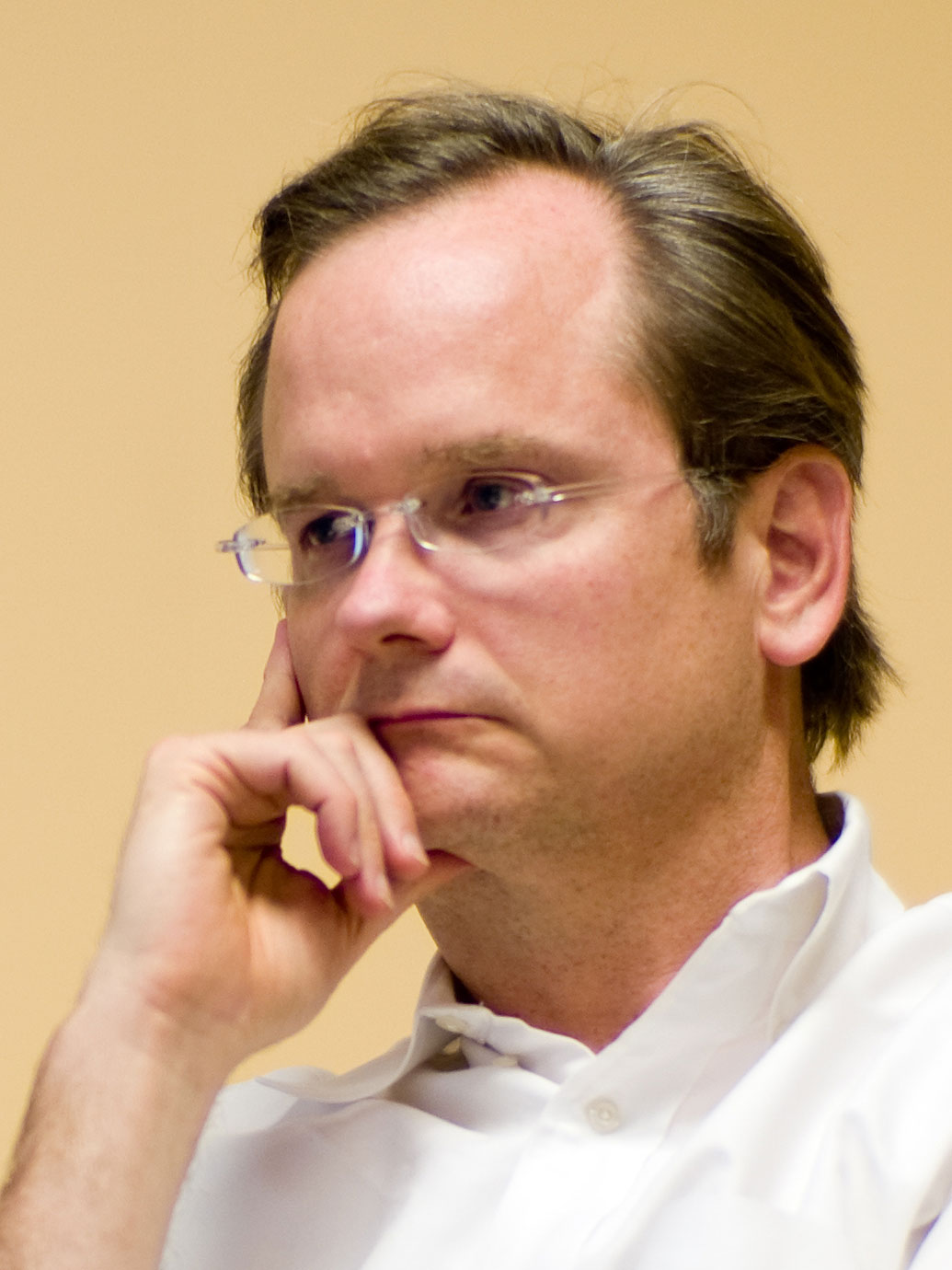
Legal scholar Lawrence Lessig '89

- Ryan Abbott, professor at the University of Surrey School of Law
- Lori Andrews, professor at Chicago–Kent College of Law
- Susan P. Crawford, professor at the Benjamin N. Cardozo School of Law
- Lawrence Lessig, professor at Harvard Law School and professor at Stanford Law School, where he founded the Center for Internet and Society
- Eben Moglen (1985), professor at Columbia Law School and founder of the Software Freedom Law Center

==== International law ====
- Harold J. Berman (1947), professor at Harvard Law School and Emory Law School
- George Bermann (1971), professor at Columbia Law School
- Rosa Brooks (1996), professor at Georgetown University Law Center
- Steve Charnovitz (1998), professor at George Washington University Law Schoolt
- Jerome Cohen (1955), professor at New York University School of Lawt
- Jack Goldsmith (1989), professor at Harvard Law School
- David O'Keeffe (LL.M. 1978), professor of European Law at University of Durham, University College London, and the University of London
- John Yoo (1992), professor at the University of California, Berkeley, School of Law

==== Jurisprudence ====
- Peter Berkowitz, professor at George Mason University School of Law
- Jules Coleman (1976), professor at Yale Law School
- Arthur Corbin (1899), professor at Yale Law School
- Jan Deutsch (1962), professor at Yale Law School
- Richard Epstein (1968), professor at New York University Law School
- Duncan Kennedy (1970), professor at Harvard Law
- Karl Llewellyn, professor at Columbia Law School and University of Chicago Law School

==== Law professors ====
- Matthew Adler (1991), law professor at Duke Law School
- Ian Ayres (1986), professor at Yale Law School and the Yale School of Management
- David C. Baldus (1964, LL.M. 1969), professor at the University of Iowa College of Law
- Boris Bittker (1941), professor at Yale Law School
- David Blankfein-Tabachnick (M.S.L. 2008), professor and associate dean at Michigan State University College of Law
- Peter A. Bradford (1964), professor at Vermont Law School
- Tomiko Brown-Nagin, professor at Harvard Law School
- Stephen Carter, professor at Yale Law School
- John C. Coffee (1969), professor at Columbia Law School
- Arthur Linton Corbin (1899), professor at Yale Law School
- Omar Dajani, professor at McGeorge School of Law
- Harlon L. Dalton, professor at Yale Law School
- Adrienne Davis, professor at Washington University in St. Louis
- Stuart L. Deutsch (1969), professor at Rutgers School of Law–Newark
- Bill Dodge (1991), professor at the University of California, Hastings College of the Law
- Elizabeth Emens (2002), professor at Columbia Law School
- Cynthia Estlund (1983), professor at New York University School of Law
- Bill Felstiner (1958), professor at Cardiff University
- Claire Finkelstein (1993), professor at the University of Pennsylvania Law School
- Nicole Garnett (1995), professor at Notre Dame Law School
- Richard Garnett (1995), professor at Notre Dame Law School
- Michael Gottesman, professor at Georgetown University Law Center
- Daniel Halberstam, professor at the University of Michigan Law School
- Clarence Halbert (1897), co–founder of William Mitchell College of Law
- Kermit L. Hall, legal historian and member of the Assassination Records Review Board
- Philip Hamburger (1982), professor at Columbia Law School
- Samuel Issacharoff (1983), professor at New York University School of Law
- Brian Kalt (1997), professor at Michigan State University College of Law
- Michael I. Krauss (LL.M. 1978), professor at George Mason University School of Law
- Ethan Leib (2003), professor at Fordham Law School
- Louis Loss (1937), professor at Harvard Law School
- Jonathan R. Macey (1982), professor at Yale Law School
- Robert T. Miller (1997), professor at the University of Iowa College of Law
- Eric L. Muller (1987), professor at the University of North Carolina School of Law
- H. Jefferson Powell (1982), professor at George Washington University School of Law
- David E. Pozen (2007), professor at Columbia Law School
- Jedediah Purdy (2001), professor at Duke University Law School
- Charles A. Reich (1952), professor at Yale Law School
- Glenn Reynolds, professor at the University of Tennessee College of Law
- L. Song Richardson (1966/67), chancellor's professor of law, University of California, Irvine School of Law
- Deborah Rhode (1977), professor at Stanford Law School
- Daniel Richman (1984), professor of law at Columbia Law School
- Fred Rodell (1931), professor at Yale Law School
- Joel Rogers, professor at the University of Wisconsin Law School
- Chris William Sanchirico (1994), professor at the University of Pennsylvania Law School
- Brett Scharffs (1992), professor at the J. Reuben Clark Law School
- Wesley Alba Sturges (1923), professor at Yale Law School
- Eleanor Swift, professor at the UC Berkeley School of Law
- Donald F. Turner (1950), professor at Harvard Law School
- Mark Tushnet (1971), professor at Harvard Law School
- Steven Walt (1988), professor at the University of Virginia School of Law
- Matthew Waxman, professor at Columbia Law School
- Mark S. Weiner, professor at Rutgers School of Law–Newark
- Charles Whitebread, professor at the University of Southern California Law School
- Steven Wilf, professor at the University of Connecticut School of Law
- Michael Wishnie, professor at Yale Law School
- Theodore Salisbury Woolsey, professor at Yale Law School
- Katra Zajc (LL.M.), professor at the University of Ljubljana

=== Other scholars ===
- Peter Berkowitz, professor of political science at Harvard University
- Scott Boorman (1978), professor of sociology at Yale University
- Lawrence Douglas (1989), professor at Amherst College
- Henry Louis Gates (did not graduate), professor of history at Harvard University
- Murray Gerstenhaber (1948), mathematician and professor at the University of Pennsylvania
- Austin Sarat (1988), professor of political science at Amherst College
- Ian Shapiro (1987), professor of political science at Yale University
- Ruth Wedgwood, professor of international relations at the School of Advanced International Studies
- Michael Woodford, professor of economics at Columbia University
- Kyu Ho Youm (M.S.L.), professor of journalism at the University of Oregon

== Activism and nonprofits ==
- Jasper Alston Atkins (1922), civil rights activist and the first black editor of the Yale Law Journal
- Carla Anderson Hills, 5th chairwoman of the Council on Foreign Relations
- Deborah Archer (1996), president of the American Civil Liberties Union
- D'Army Bailey (1967), civil rights activist and founder of the National Civil Rights Museum
- Mark Barnes (1984), attorney and AIDS activist
- Craig Becker, labor attorney and a member of the National Labor Relations Board
- Dana Berliner, public interest attorney at the Institute for justice
- Cornell William Brooks, former president & CEO, NAACP
- Kathleen Neal Cleaver, prominent member of the Black Panther Party
- Bill Drayton (1970), founder of Ashoka: Innovators for the Public
- Marian Wright Edelman (1963), president and founder of the Children's Defense Fund
- Robert Gnaizda, co-founder of the Greenlining Institute
- Seth Green, founder of Americans for Informed Democracy
- John P. Hannah, senior fellow at the Washington Institute for Near East Policy
- Kenneth Hecht, public interest attorney and advocate for improved access to affordable, nutritious food
- Louis Clayton Jones, civil rights activist and founder of the National Conference of Black Lawyers
- Van Jones (1993), founder of Green For All
- Bruce J. Katz (1985), vice president of the Brookings Institution
- Bayless Manning (1949), 1st president of the Council on Foreign Relations
- Gay McDougall, executive director of Global Rights
- Michael Meltsner, first assistant counsel for the NAACP Legal Defense Fund
- Creighton Miller, founder of the National Football League Players Association labor union
- Lisa Richette, child welfare activist
- Catherine Roraback (1948), civil rights attorney best known for representing the plaintiffs in the 1965 Supreme Court case Griswold v. Connecticut
- Kenneth Roth (1980), executive director of Human Rights Watch
- Linda Rottenberg, founder of Endeavor
- Andrew Shapiro, founder of GreenOrder
- James Speth (1969), attorney and environmental activist
- Gregory Stanton, founder and president of Genocide Watch
- R. Douglas Stuart Jr. (1946), founder of the America First Committee while a student at Yale Law
- Neera Tanden (1996), president of the Center for American Progress
- William Taylor (1954), civil rights activist
- Jesselyn Radack (1995), human rights lawyer
- Krish O'Mara Vignarajah, president and CEO of Lutheran Immigration and Refugee Service
- John P. Wheeler III (1975), chairman of the Vietnam Veterans Memorial Fund

== Arts and architecture ==
- T. Bill Andrews, abstract impressionist painter
- Iwan Tirta (1964), fashion designer

== Attorneys ==
=== Private sector ===
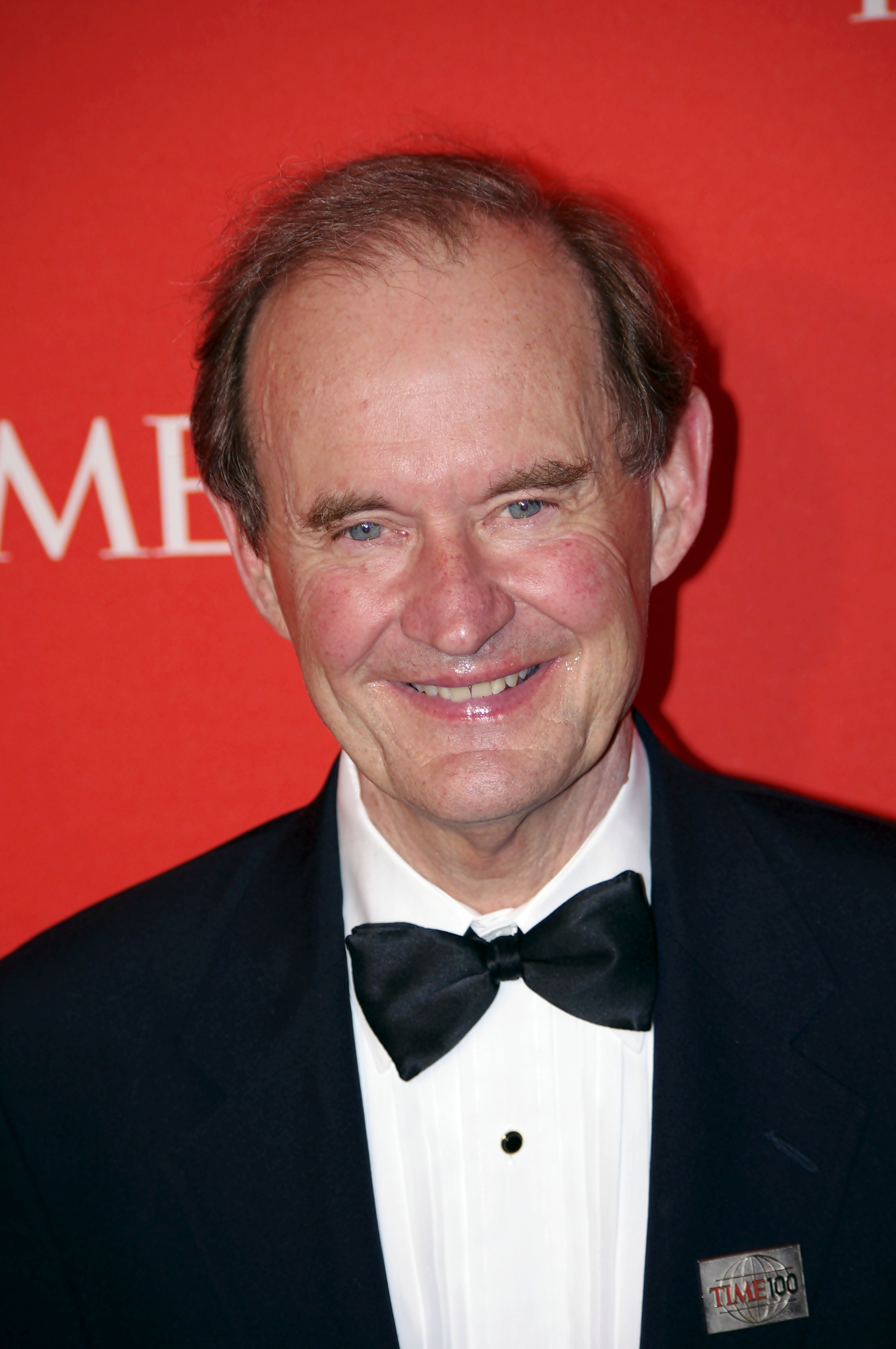
Attorney David Boies '66

- Floyd Abrams (1960), attorney at Cahill Gordon & Reindel
- Douglas Arant (1923), attorney
- Michael F. Armstrong, attorney
- Francis N. Bangs (1847), founding partner of Bangs & Stetson, now Davis, Polk & Wardwell
- Thomas D. Barr (1931–2008), lawyer at Cravath, Swaine & Moore
- Bouvier Beale, attorney and first cousin of Jacqueline Kennedy Onassis and Lee Radziwill
- Hunter Biden, founding partner of Oldaker, Biden & Belai son of Joe Biden
- David Boies (1966), chairman of Boies, Schiller & Flexner
- Ralph Cavanagh, environmental attorney and co–director of the air/energy program at the Natural Resources Defense Council
- William Coblentz (1947), attorney who played an important role in California politics after World War II
- Julien Davies Cornell, attorney noted for his defense of Ezra Pound
- J. Richardson Dilworth (1942), attorney for the Rockefeller family
- Peter E. Fleming Jr. (1958), criminal defense attorney
- Bob Giuffra (1987), partner with Sullivan & Cromwell
- Charles Halpern (1964), co-founder of the Center for Law and Social Policy
- James Hamilton (1969), assistant chief counsel for the United States Senate Watergate Committee
- Whitfield Jack (1932), attorney in Shreveport, Louisiana
- David E. Kendall (1971), attorney who advised Bill Clinton during the Lewinsky scandal and the Impeachment of Bill Clinton
- George Kern (1952), partner of Sullivan & Cromwell
- Abha Khanna (2007), attorney known for redistricting law and voting rights
- Henry T. King (1943), prosecutor at the Nuremberg trials
- Arthur Kramer, founding partner of Kramer Levin
- Mark I. Levy (1975), appellate attorney
- Arthur Mag, legal counsel to Harry S. Truman
- Bessie Margolin (1933), labor attorney
- Ann Olivarius (1986), sexual harassment lawyer
- Stephen Shulman (1958), attorney most notable for representing Egil Krogh in the Watergate scandal
- Paul M. Smith (1979), attorney at Jenner & Block
- Louis W. Tompros, lawyer
- Leonard Weinglass (1958), criminal defense attorney and constitutional law advocate
- Arnold M. Zack (1956), arbitrator and mediator of labor management disputes

=== U.S. attorneys general ===
- Mark D. Agrast (1985), deputy assistant attorney general for the Office of Legislative Affairs of the United States Department of Justice
- Herbert Brownell Jr. (1927), U.S. attorney general
- Homer Stille Cummings (1893), U.S. attorney general
- Nicholas Katzenbach (1947), U.S. attorney general
- Peter Keisler (1985), acting U.S. attorney general
- Edward H. Levi (1938), U.S. attorney general
- Wayne MacVeagh (1856), U.S. attorney general
- Michael B. Mukasey (1967), U.S. attorney general
- Edwards Pierrepont (1840), U.S. attorney general
- Alphonso Taft (1838), U.S. attorney general

=== U.S. solicitors general ===
- Drew S. Days, III (1966), U.S. solicitor general
- Walter E. Dellinger III (1966), acting solicitor general
- Neal Katyal (1995), acting solicitor general
- Thomas D. Thacher (did not graduate), U.S. solicitor general
- Seth P. Waxman (1977), U.S. solicitor general

=== State attorneys general ===
- Rob Bonta (1998), attorney general of California
- James M. Brown (1967), Oregon attorney general
- Kimberly B. Cheney (1964), Vermont attorney general
- Robert E. Cooper Jr. (1983), Tennessee attorney general
- Robert Del Tufo (1958), New Jersey attorney general
- Stephen H. Sachs, attorney general of Maryland
- John Wesley Wescott, attorney general of New Jersey

=== Other ===
- Chesa Boudin (2011), district attorney of San Francisco
- Lloyd Cutler (1939), White House counsel
- Tali Farhadian (2003), US federal prosecutor
- Dawn Johnsen (1986), head of the Office of Legal Counsel
- Eric Miller (1995), U.S. attorney for Vermont
- Robert M. Morgenthau (1948), New York County district attorney
- Jesselyn Radack (1995), ethics adviser to the United States Department of Justice
- Marissa Roy (2017), Los Angeles City Attorney
- Danielle Sassoon (2011), United States Attorney for the Southern District of New York
- Andrea R. Wood (1998), senior counsel for the United States Securities and Exchange Commission

== Business ==
- Lon Babby (1976), president of the Phoenix Suns
- Jeff Ballabon, senior vice president of CBS News; founder of Coordinating Council on Jerusalem
- Alfred Wellington Carter (1893), manager of Parker Ranch and founder of the Hawaii Meat Company
- Dick Cass (1971), president of the Baltimore Ravens
- Sam Cohn (1956), co-founder of International Creative Management and talent agent
- E. Virgil Conway (1956), chairman and CEO of the New York State Metropolitan Transportation Authority
- Michael R. Eisenson (1981), co-founder, managing director, and CEO of Charlesbank Capital Partners
- Charles E. Fraser, real estate developer
- Arthur Frommer (1953), publisher of Frommer's travel guidebook series
- Tom Glocer, CEO of Thomson Reuters and Reuters
- Najeeb Halaby (1940), businessman and father of Queen Noor of Jordan
- Robert S. Harrison, financier
- Joel Hyatt, co-founder of Current TV
- Eli Jacobs (1964), financier and owner of the Baltimore Orioles
- William M. Jennings, executive in the National Hockey League and president of the New York Rangers
- Victor S. Johnson, Jr., president of Aladdin Industries
- John Koskinen, non-executive chairman of Freddie Mac
- Michael E. Levine (1965), airline executive
- Larry Lucchino (1971), president and CEO of the Boston Red Sox
- J. Howard Marshall (1931), oil magnate, known for his marriage to Anna Nicole Smith
- Mark McCormack, founder of IMG
- Nicolas D. Muzin (1975), founder of Stonington Global
- Neal Pilson (1963), former president of CBS Sports
- Robert Pozen (1972, J.S.D. 1973), vice chairman and president of Fidelity Investments
- Vivek Ramaswamy (2013), founder and CEO of Roivant Sciences
- Ken Stern, CEO of National Public Radio
- John Butler Talcott (1846), industrialist and founder of the New Britain Museum of American Art
- Brooks Thomas, CEO of Harper & Row
- Raymond S. Troubh, independent financial consultant, general partner at Lazard, interim chairman of Enron
- Tim and Nina Zagat (1966), co-founders and publishers of Zagat
- John E. Zuccotti (1963), real estate developer and namesake of Zuccotti Park

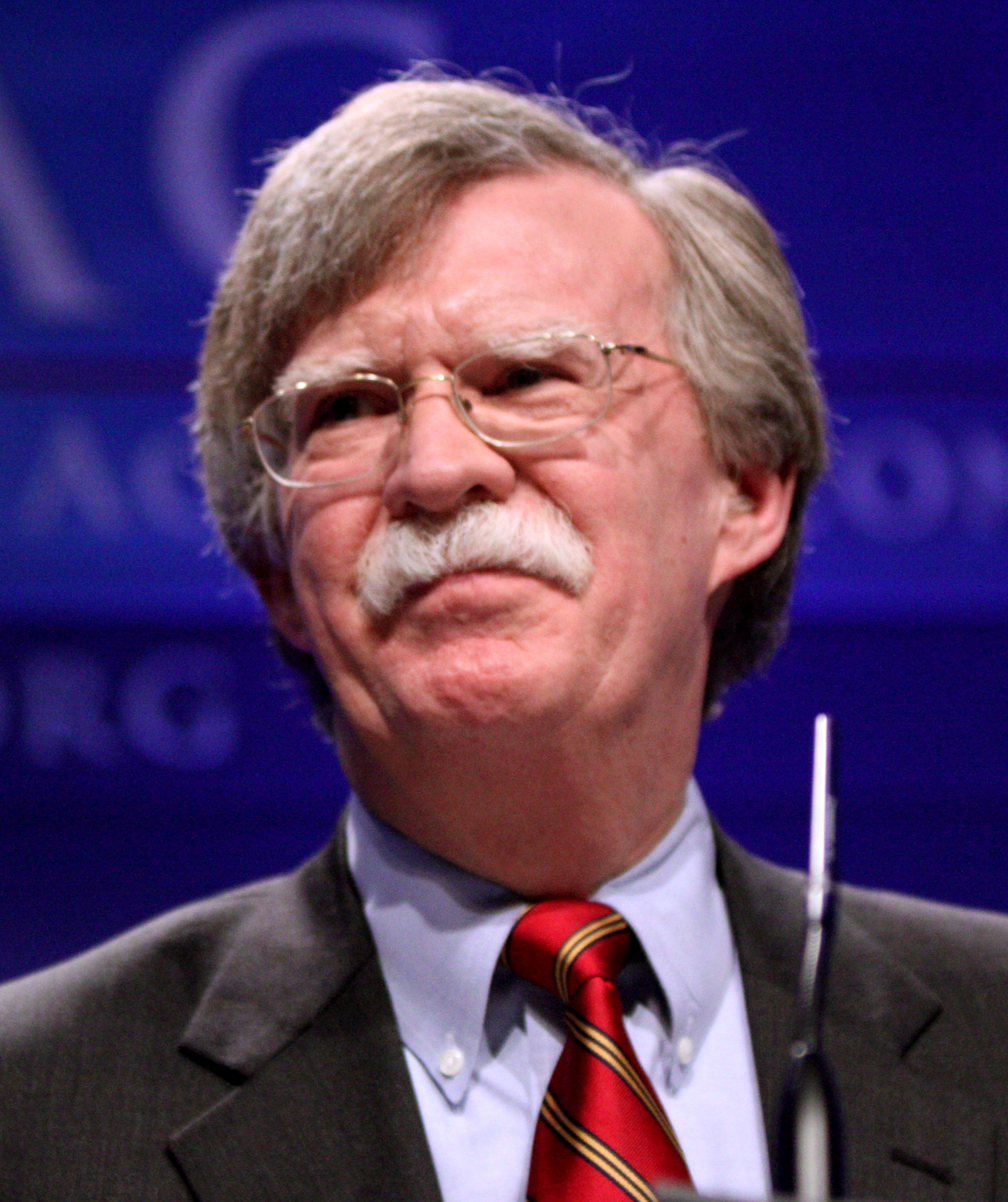
Ambassador John R. Bolton '74

== Diplomacy ==
- William H. Stiles (1849) United States chargé d'affaires to the Austrian Empire
- John R. Bolton (1974), United States ambassador to the United Nations
- Winthrop G. Brown (1930), U.S. ambassador to South Korea
- John Danforth (1963), United States ambassador to the United Nations
- Richard N. Gardner (1951), U.S. ambassador to Spain; U.S. ambassador to Italy
- Ulric Haynes (1956), U.S. ambassador to Algeria
- David Huebner (1986), U.S. ambassador to New Zealand
- George Pratt Ingersoll (1885), U.S. ambassador to Thailand
- Eugene M. Locke (1940), U.S. ambassador to Pakistan
- Robert McCallum Jr. (1973), U.S. ambassador to Australia
- John O'Leary (1969), U.S. ambassador to Chile
- Sargent Shriver (1941), U.S. ambassador to France; the driving force behind the Peace Corps
- Gerard C. Smith (1938), chief delegate to the Strategic Arms Limitation Talks and director of the Arms Control and Disarmament Agency
- R. Douglas Stuart Jr. (1946), U.S. ambassador to Norway
- Peter Tufo, U.S. ambassador to Hungary

== Entertainment ==
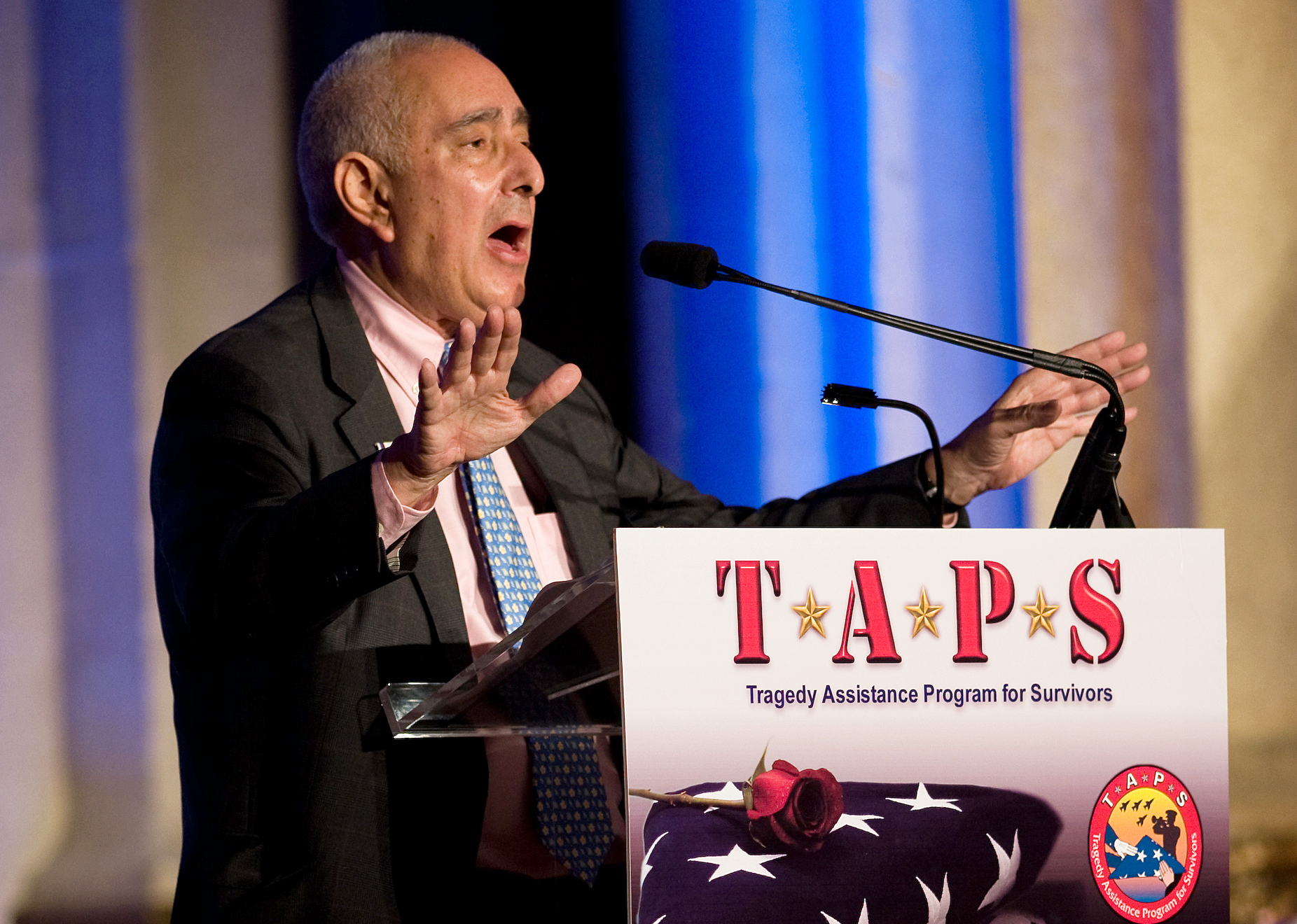
Actor Ben Stein '70

- Lisa Bloom (1986), anchor of Lisa Bloom: Open Court on Court TV
- La Carmina, Canadian fashion blogger, author, journalist, and host on CNNGo
- Katy Chevigny, documentary filmmaker
- Jeff Greenfield (1967), senior political correspondent for CBS Evening News
- Van Jones (1993), political analyst for CNN
- Charlie Korsmo (2006), actor and lawyer the film adaptation of Dick Tracy, Hook, and Can't Hardly Wait
- Mark Levine, progressive political pundit and radio host
- Yul Kwon (2000), host of American Revealed on PBS and winner of Survivor: Cook Islands
- D. G. Martin, host of North Carolina Bookwatch on UNC-TV
- Michael Medved (did not graduate), radio talk show host
- David Milch (did not graduate), television writer and producer
- Gene Sperling (1985), writer on The West Wing
- Ben Stein (1970), actor and host of Win Ben Stein's Money
- Frederick Wiseman (1954), acclaimed documentarian and filmmaker

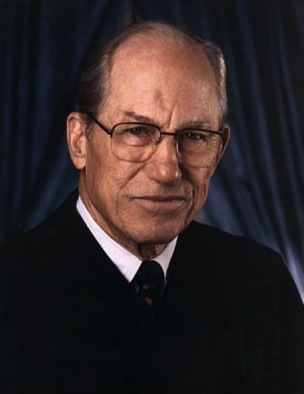
Supreme Court justice Byron White '46

== Judges ==
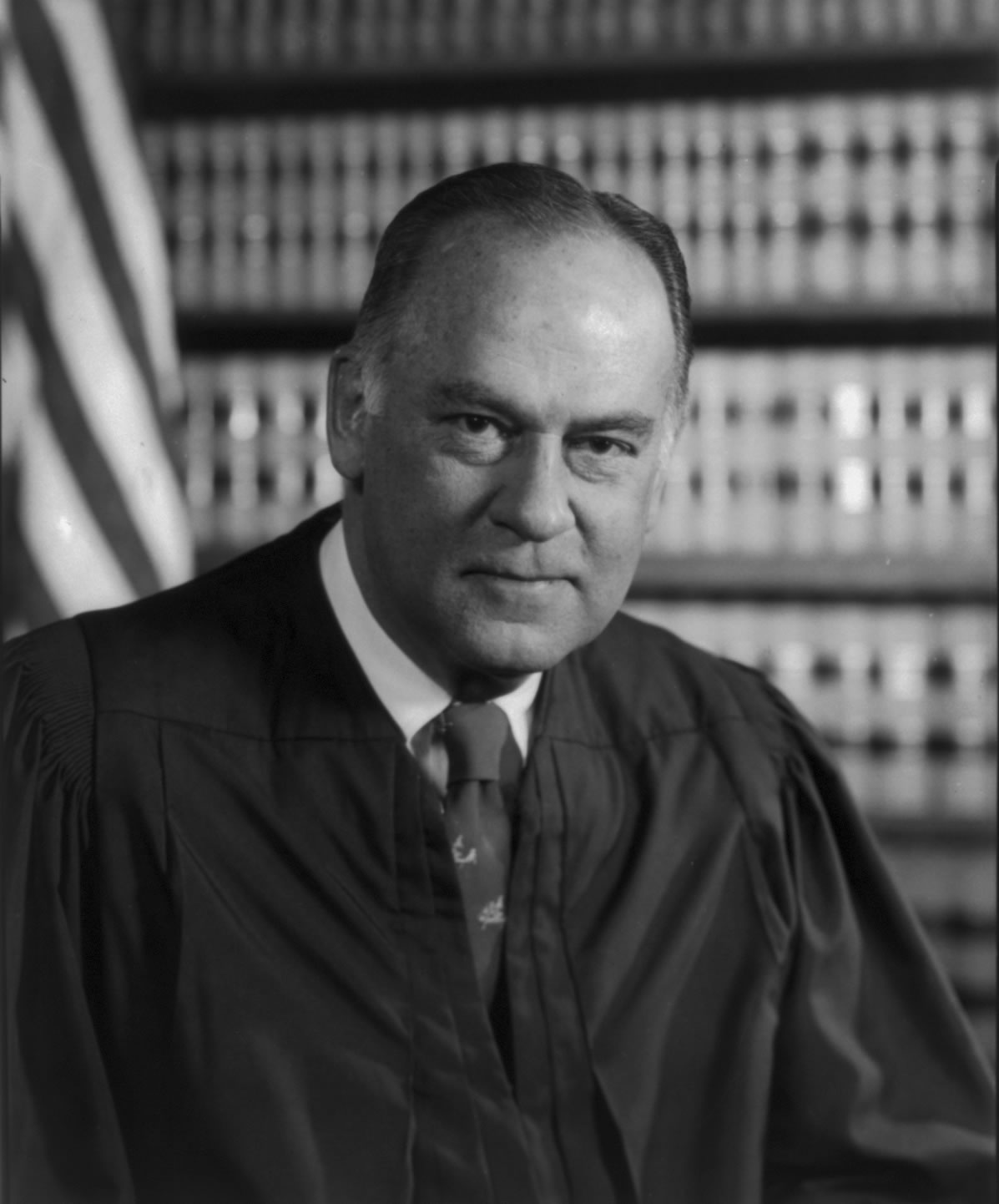
Supreme Court justice Potter Stewart '41

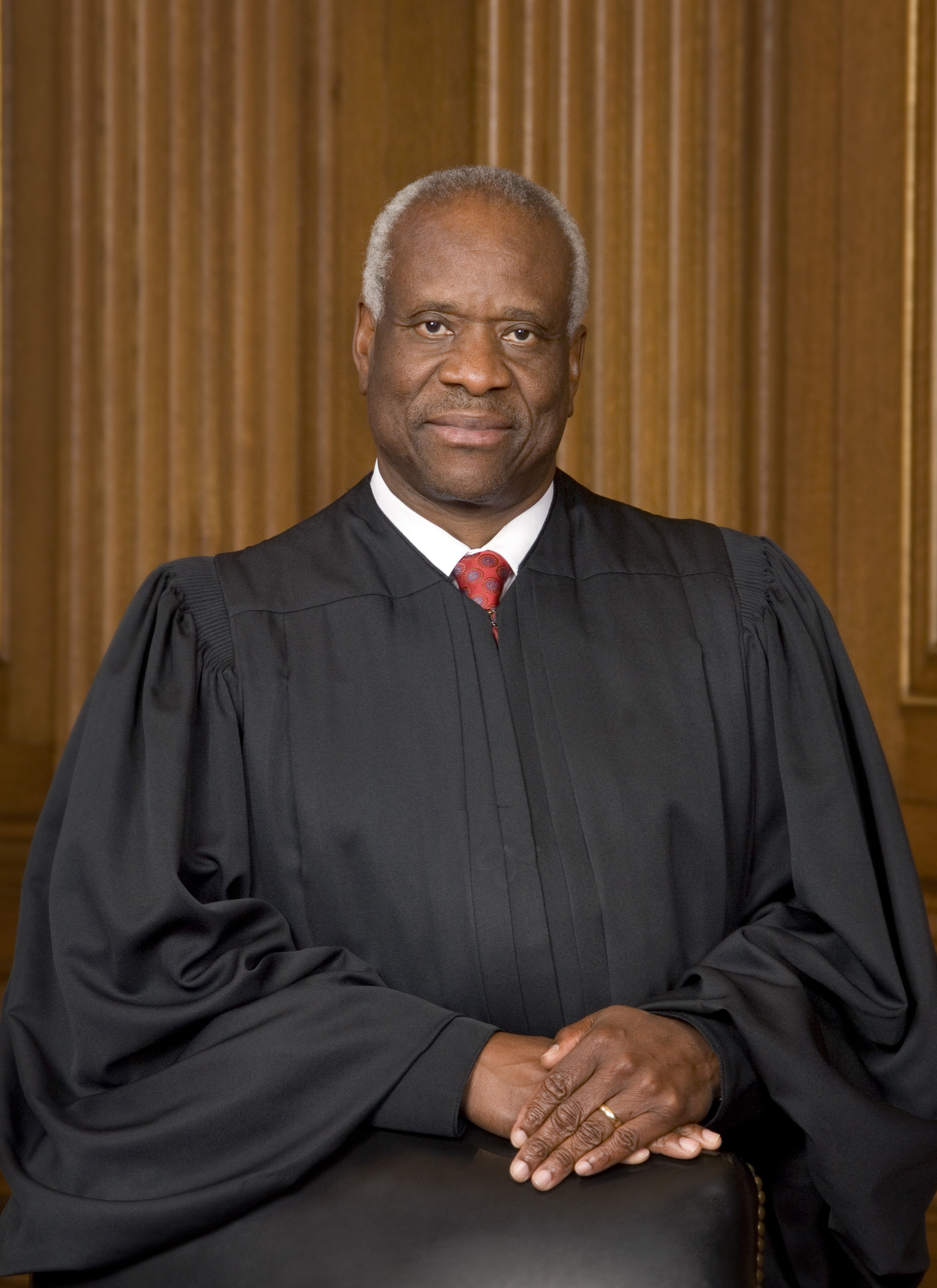
Supreme Court justice Clarence Thomas '74

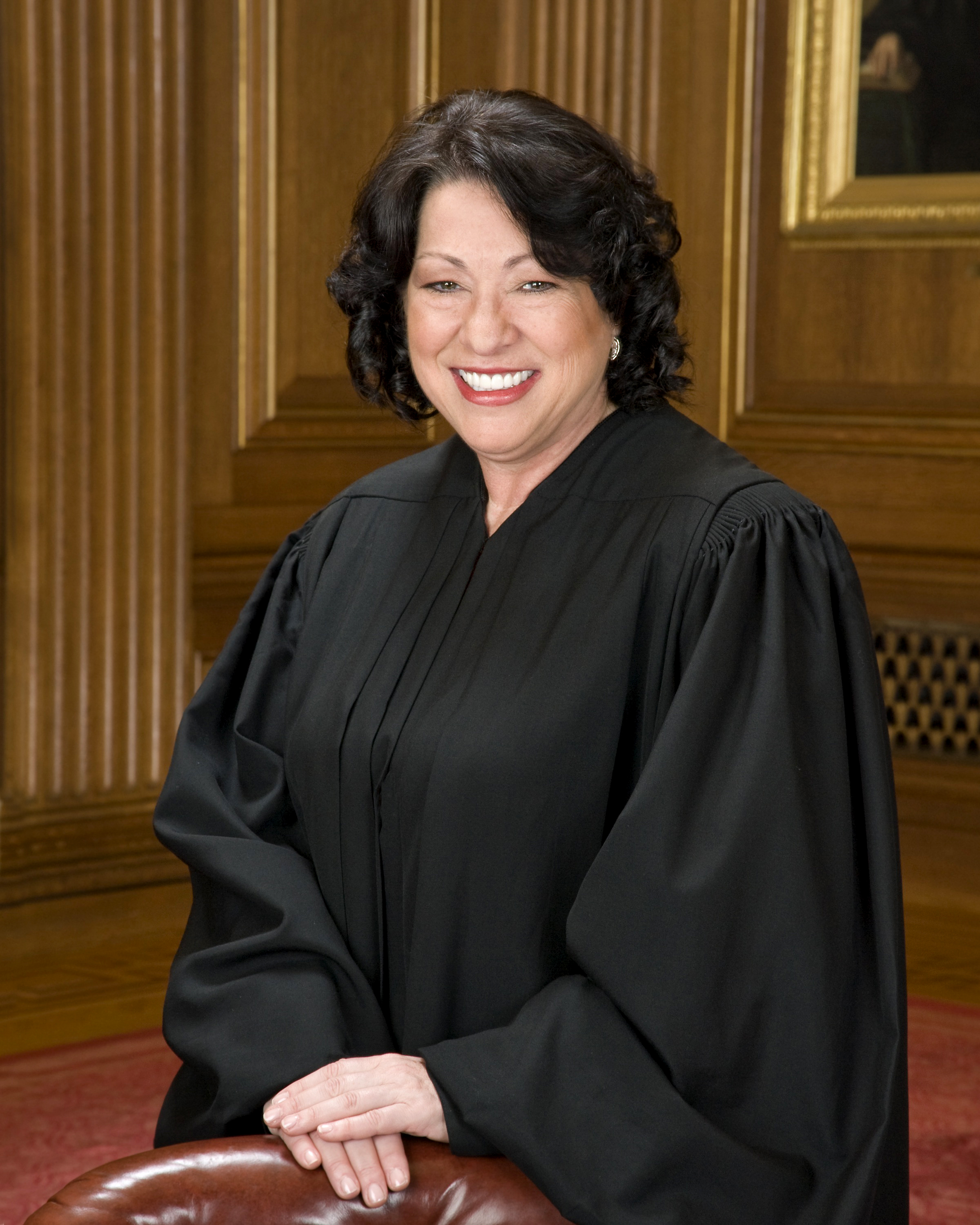
Supreme Court justice Sonia Sotomayor '79

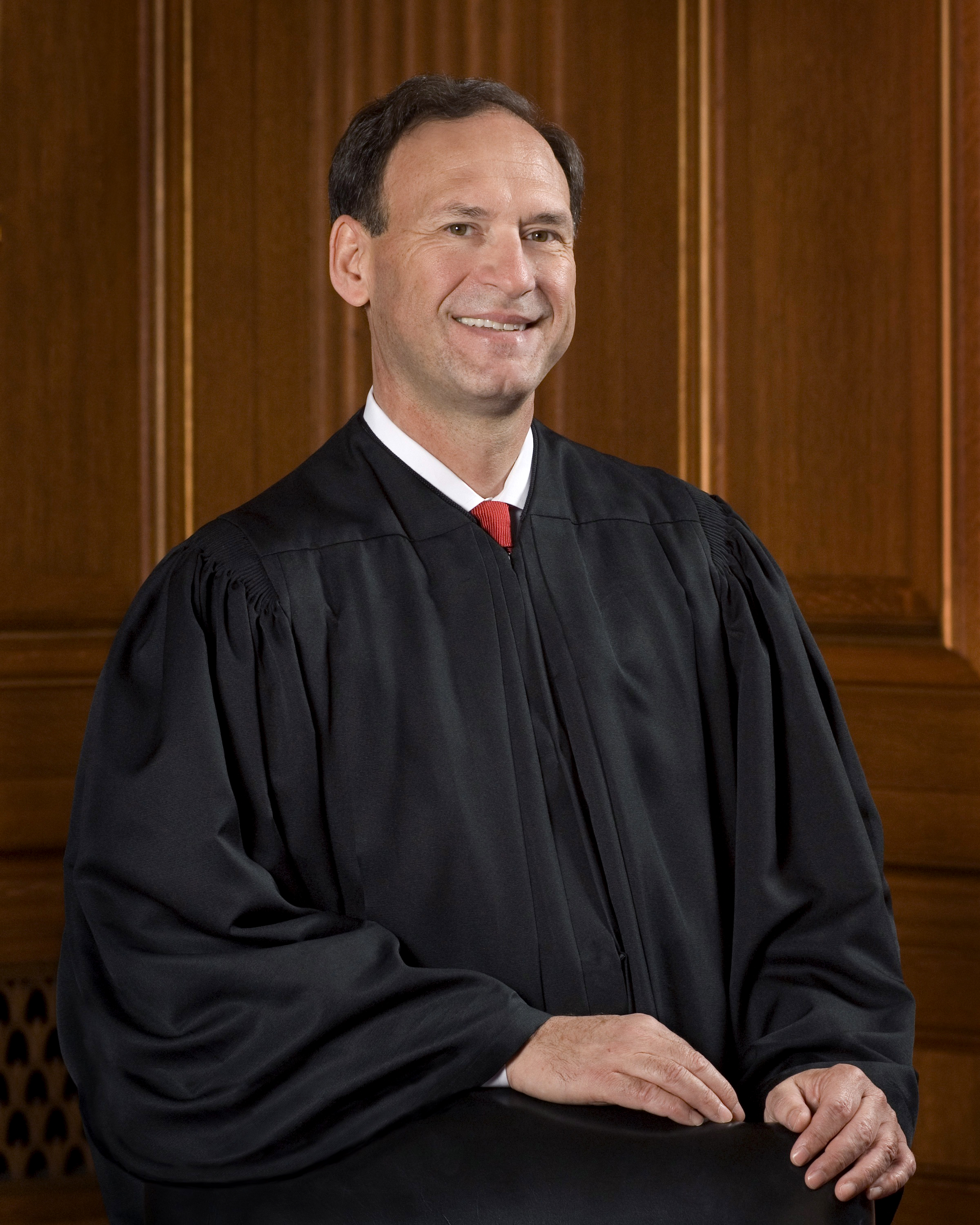
Supreme Court justice Samuel Alito '75

=== U.S. Supreme Court justices ===
- Samuel Alito (1975), associate justice
- Henry Billings Brown (did not graduate), associate justice
- David Davis (1835), associate justice
- Abe Fortas (1933), associate justice
- Brett Kavanaugh (1990), associate justice
- Sherman Minton (1916), associate justice
- George Shiras Jr. (1853), associate justice
- Sonia Sotomayor (1979), associate justice
- Potter Stewart (1941), associate justice
- Clarence Thomas (1974), associate justice
- Byron White (1946), associate justice

=== Federal courts of appeals ===
- Robert P. Anderson (1929), judge for the U.S. Court of Appeals for the Second Circuit
- Herschel W. Arant (1915), judge for the U.S. Court of Appeals for the Sixth Circuit
- Edward R. Becker (1957), chief judge of the U.S. Court of Appeals for the Third Circuit
- Duane Benton (1975), judge for the U.S. Court of Appeals for the Eighth Circuit
- Stephanos Bibas (1994), judge for the U.S. Court of Appeals for the Third Circuit
- Wilbur F. Booth (1888), judge for the U.S. Court of Appeals for the Eighth Circuit
- José A. Cabranes (1965), judge for the U.S. Court of Appeals for the Second Circuit
- Guido Calabresi (1958), judge for the U.S. Court of Appeals for the Second Circuit
- Charles Edward Clark (1913), judge for the U.S. Court of Appeals for the Second Circuit
- Eric L. Clay (1972), judge for the U.S. Court of Appeals for the Sixth Circuit
- Richard Clifton, judge for the U.S. Court of Appeals for the Ninth Circuit
- R. Guy Cole Jr. (1975), chief judge of the U.S. Court of Appeals for the Sixth Circuit
- Steven Colloton (1988), judge for the U.S. Court of Appeals for the Eighth Circuit
- Richard Cudahy (1955), judge for the U.S. Court of Appeals for the Seventh Circuit
- Conrad K. Cyr (1956), judge for the U.S. Court of Appeals for the First Circuit
- William A. Fletcher (1975), judge for the U.S. Court of Appeals for the Ninth Circuit
- Arianna J. Freeman (2007), judge for the U.S. Court of Appeals for the Third Circuit
- Susan P. Graber (1972), judge for the U.S. Court of Appeals for the Ninth Circuit
- Morton Ira Greenberg (1957), judge for the U.S. Court of Appeals for the Third Circuit
- Pamela Harris (1990), judge for the U.S. Court of Appeals for the Fourth Circuit
- David Hamilton (1983), judge for the U.S. Court of Appeals for the Seventh Circuit
- A. Leon Higginbotham Jr. (1952), judge for the U.S. Court of Appeals for the Third Circuit
- Stephen A. Higginson (1987), judge for the U.S. Court of Appeals for the Fifth Circuit
- Carroll C. Hincks, judge for the U.S. Court of Appeals for the Second Circuit
- Andrew D. Hurwitz (1972), judge for the U.S. Court of Appeals for the Ninth Circuit
- Robert Katzmann (1980), judge for the U.S. Court of Appeals for the Second Circuit
- Carolyn Dineen King (1962), judge for the U.S. Court of Appeals for the Fifth Circuit
- Kermit Lipez (1967), judge for the U.S. Court of Appeals for the First Circuit
- Eunice C. Lee (1996), judge for the U.S Court of Appeals for the Second Circuit
- Scott Matheson Jr. (1980), judge for the U.S. Court of Appeals for the Tenth Circuit
- William Ernest Miller (1933), judge for the U.S. Court of Appeals for the Sixth Circuit
- Jon O. Newman (1956), judge for the U.S. Court of Appeals for the Second Circuit
- Barrington Daniels Parker Jr. (1969), judge for the U.S. Court of Appeals for the Second Circuit,
- Jill A. Pryor (1988), judge for the U.S. Court of Appeals for the Eleventh Circuit
- Robert Raymar (1972), judge for the U.S. Court of Appeals for the Third Circuit
- Stephen Reinhardt (1954), judge for the U.S. Court of Appeals for the Ninth Circuit
- Roger Robb (1931), judge for the U.S. Court of Appeals for the District of Columbia Circuit
- Oliver Seth (1940), chief judge of the U.S. Court of Appeals for the Tenth Circuit
- Richard G. Taranto (1981), judge for the U.S. Court of Appeals for the Federal Circuit
- Albert Tate Jr. (1947), judge for the U.S. Court of Appeals for the Fifth Circuit
- William H. Timbers, judge for the U.S. Court of Appeals for the Second Circuit
- William Kneeland Townsend, judge for the U.S. Court of Appeals for the Second Circuit
- Patricia Wald (1951), chief judge of the U.S. Court of Appeals for the District of Columbia Circuit
- George Thomas Washington (1932), judge for the U.S. Court of Appeals for the District of Columbia Circuit
- Ralph Winter (1960), judge for the U.S. Court of Appeals for the Second Circuit

=== Federal district courts ===
- Ronnie Abrams (1993), judge for the U.S. District Court for the Southern District of New York
- William Acker (1952), judge for the U.S. District Court for the Northern District of Alabama
- Roy Altman (2007), judge for the U.S. District Court for the Southern District of Florida
- Cecilia Altonaga (1986), judge for the U.S. District Court for the Southern District of Florida
- Harold Baer Jr. (1957), judge for the U.S. District Court for the Southern District of New York
- David Barlow, judge for the U.S. District Court for the District of Utah
- James E. Boasberg (1990), judge for the U.S. District Court for the District of Columbia
- Paul D. Borman (LL.M. 1964), judge for the U.S. District Court for the Eastern District of Michigan
- Howard C. Bratton (1947), chief judge of the U.S. District Court for the District of New Mexico
- Philip A. Brimmer (1985), judge for the U.S. District Court for the District of Colorado
- Ellen Bree Burns (1923), chief judge of the U.S. District Court for the District of Connecticut
- Edward N. Cahn (1958), judge for the U.S. District Court for the Eastern District of Pennsylvania
- Charles Hardy Carr (1926), judge for the U.S. District Court for the Southern District of California and the U.S. District Court for the Central District of California
- Paul Charlton, judge for the U.S. District Court for the District of Puerto Rico
- Frank C. Damrell Jr. (1964), judge for the U.S. District Court for the Eastern District of California
- Joseph A. Diclerico Jr. (1966), chief judge of the U.S. District Court for the District of New Hampshire
- Jan E. DuBois (1957), judge for the U.S. District Court for the Eastern District of Pennsylvania
- Warren William Eginton (1951), judge for the U.S. District Court for the District of Connecticut
- David A. Faber (1967), judge for the U.S. District Court for the Southern District of West Virginia
- Eldon E. Fallon (LL.M. 1963), judge for the U.S. District Court for the Eastern District of Louisiana
- A. Joe Fish (1968), chief judge of the U.S. District Court for the Northern District of Texas
- Dabney L. Friedrich (1992), judge for the U.S. District Court for the District of Columbia
- Jesse M. Furman (1998), judge for the U.S. District Court for the Southern District of New York
- Nina Gershon (1965), judge for the U.S. District Court for the Eastern District of New York
- Nancy Gertner (1971), judge for the U.S. District Court for the District of Massachusetts
- Gerhard Gesell (1935), judge for the U.S. District Court for the District of Columbia
- James Tyrone Giles (1967), judge for the U.S. District Court for the Eastern District of Pennsylvania
- Charles S. Haight Jr. (1955), judge for the U.S. District Court for the Southern District of New York
- Jean Constance Hamilton (LL.M. 1982), chief judge of the U.S. District Court for the Eastern District of Missouri
- A. Andrew Hauk (1942), chief judge of the U.S. District Court for the Central District of California
- Dale Ho, judge of the U.S. District Court for the Southern District of New York
- Truman McGill Hobbs (1948), chief judge of the U.S. District Court for the Middle District of Alabama
- Marvin Katz (1954), judge for the U.S. District Court for the Eastern District of Pennsylvania
- Bruce William Kauffman (1959), judge for the U.S. District Court for the Eastern District of Pennsylvania
- Samuel Pailthorpe King (1940), judge for the U.S. District Court for the District of Hawaii
- John A. Kronstadt (1976), judge for the U.S. District Court for the Central District of California
- Morris E. Lasker (1941), judge for the U.S. District Court for the Southern District of New York
- Victor Marrero (1968), judge for the U.S. District Court for the Southern District of New York
- Frank Hampton McFadden (1955), judge for the U.S. District Court for the Northern District of Alabama
- Richard Wellington McLaren (1942), judge for the U.S. District Court for the Northern District of Illinois
- Arvo Mikkanen (1986), U.S. District Court for the Northern District of Oklahoma
- Louis F. Oberdorfer (1946), judge for the U.S. District Court for the District of Columbia
- James Francis Thaddeus O'Connor (1909), judge for the U.S. District Court for the Southern District of California
- J. Paul Oetken (1991), judge for the U.S. District Court for the Southern District of New York
- Jill Parrish (1985), judge for the U.S. District Court for the District of Utah
- James Perry Platt (1875), judge for the U.S. District Court for the District of Connecticut
- Thomas Collier Platt Jr. (1950), judge for the U.S. District Court for the Eastern District of New York
- Louis H. Pollak (1948), judge for the U.S. District Court for the Eastern District of Pennsylvania
- Michael Ponsor (1975), judge for the U.S. District Court for the District of Massachusetts
- Michael Shea (1993), judge for the U.S. District Court for the District of Connecticut
- Oliver Perry Shiras (1856), judge for the U.S. District Court for the Northern District of Iowa
- Dominic J. Squatrito (1965), judge for the U.S. District Court for the District of Connecticut
- Leonard P. Stark (1996), judge for the U.S. District Court for the District of Delaware
- Edwin DeHaven Steel Jr. (1931), judge for the U.S. District Court for the District of Delaware
- Sidney Stein (1969), judge for the U.S. District Court for the Southern District of New York
- Richard J. Sullivan (1990), judge for the U.S. District Court for the Southern District of New York
- Robert W. Sweet (1948), judge for the U.S. District Court for the Southern District of New York
- Robert Taylor (1924), chief judge of the U.S. District Court for the Eastern District of Tennessee
- Charles Henry Tenney (1936), judge for the U.S. District Court for the Southern District of New York
- Edwin Stark Thomas (1895), judge for the U.S. District Court for the District of Connecticut
- Alvin Thompson (1978), judge for the U.S. District Court for the District of Connecticut
- Myron H. Thompson (1972), chief judge of the U.S. District Court for the Middle District of Alabama
- Stefan R. Underhill (1982), judge for the U.S. District Court for the District of Connecticut
- William H. Walls (1957), judge for the U.S. District Court for the District of New Jersey
- Henry Travillion Wingate (1972), chief judge of the U.S. District Court for the Southern District of Mississippi
- Gregory Howard Woods (1995), judge of the U.S. District Court for the Southern District of New York; general counsel of the United States Department of Energy
- Caleb Merrill Wright (1933), chief judge of the U.S. District Court for the District of Delaware
- William H. Yohn Jr. (1960), judge for the U.S. District Court for the Eastern District of Pennsylvania
- Robert Carmine Zampano (1954), judge for the U.S. District Court for the District of Connecticut

=== Other U.S. courts ===
- Gary S. Katzmann (1979), judge for the United States Court of International Trade
- J. Rich Leonard (1976), U.S. Bankruptcy judge for the Eastern District of North Carolina
- Albert Levitt (1923), judge for the District Court of the Virgin Islands
- Lyman E. Munson (1851), justice of the Territorial Montana Supreme Court
- William Josiah Tilson (1896, LL.M. 1897), judge for the United States Court of International Trade

=== State judges ===
- Theo Angelis (1999), associate justice of the Washington Supreme Court
- Christopher L. Avery (1897), associate justice of the Connecticut Supreme Court
- William B. Chandler III, chancellor, Delaware Court of Chancery
- John M. Comley (1920), associate justice of the Connecticut Supreme Court
- Bessie Dewar, associate justice, Massachusetts Supreme Judicial Court
- Rick Haselton, chief judge, Oregon Court of Appeals
- Ernest A. Inglis, chief justice, Connecticut Supreme Court
- Jeffrey W. Johnson (1985), judge, California Court of Appeal
- Leondra Kruger (2001), associate justice, California Supreme Court
- Hans A. Linde (1966), justice, Oregon Supreme Court; correspondent for CBS Evening News
- Goodwin Liu (1998), associate justice, California Supreme Court
- William M. Maltbie (1905), chief justice, Connecticut Supreme Court
- Monica Márquez (1997), associate justice, Colorado Supreme Court
- Margaret H. Marshall, chief justice, Massachusetts Supreme Judicial Court
- Marshall F. McComb (1919), associate justice, California Supreme Court
- Walter Myers Jr. (1938), associate justice, Indiana Supreme Court
- George W. Wheeler (1883), chief justice, Connecticut Supreme Court
- J. Craig Wright (1954), associate justice, Ohio Supreme Court

=== Local courts ===
- Jane Bolin (1931), judge for the New York City Domestic Relations Court; the first African–American woman to serve as a judge in the United States

=== Non-United States judicial figures ===
- Luís Roberto Barroso (LL.M. 1989), judge for the Supreme Court of Brazil
- Leo Barry (LL.M. 1968), justice for the Supreme Court of Newfoundland and Labrador
- Daryl Dawson (LL.M. 1956), justice of the High Court of Australia
- Todd Ducharme (LL.M. 1991), Ontario Superior Court of Justice
- Enrique Fernando (1948), chief justice of the Supreme Court of the Philippines
- Stephan Harbarth (LL.M. 2000), president of the Federal Constitutional Court of Germany
- Rosalyn Higgins (J.S.D. 1962), English judge and president of the International Court of Justice
- Philip Jessup (1924), judge for the International Court of Justice
- Gérard La Forest (LL.M. 1965), puisne justice of the Supreme Court of Canada
- Johnnie Lewis (LL.M. 1971), chief justice of Liberia
- Cecilia Muñoz-Palma (LL.M. 1954), first woman appointed to the Supreme Court of the Philippines
- Shigeru Oda (J.S.D. 1953), Japanese judge for the International Court of Justice
- Ksenija Turkoviç, Croatian judge at the European Court of Human Rights

== Literature and journalism ==
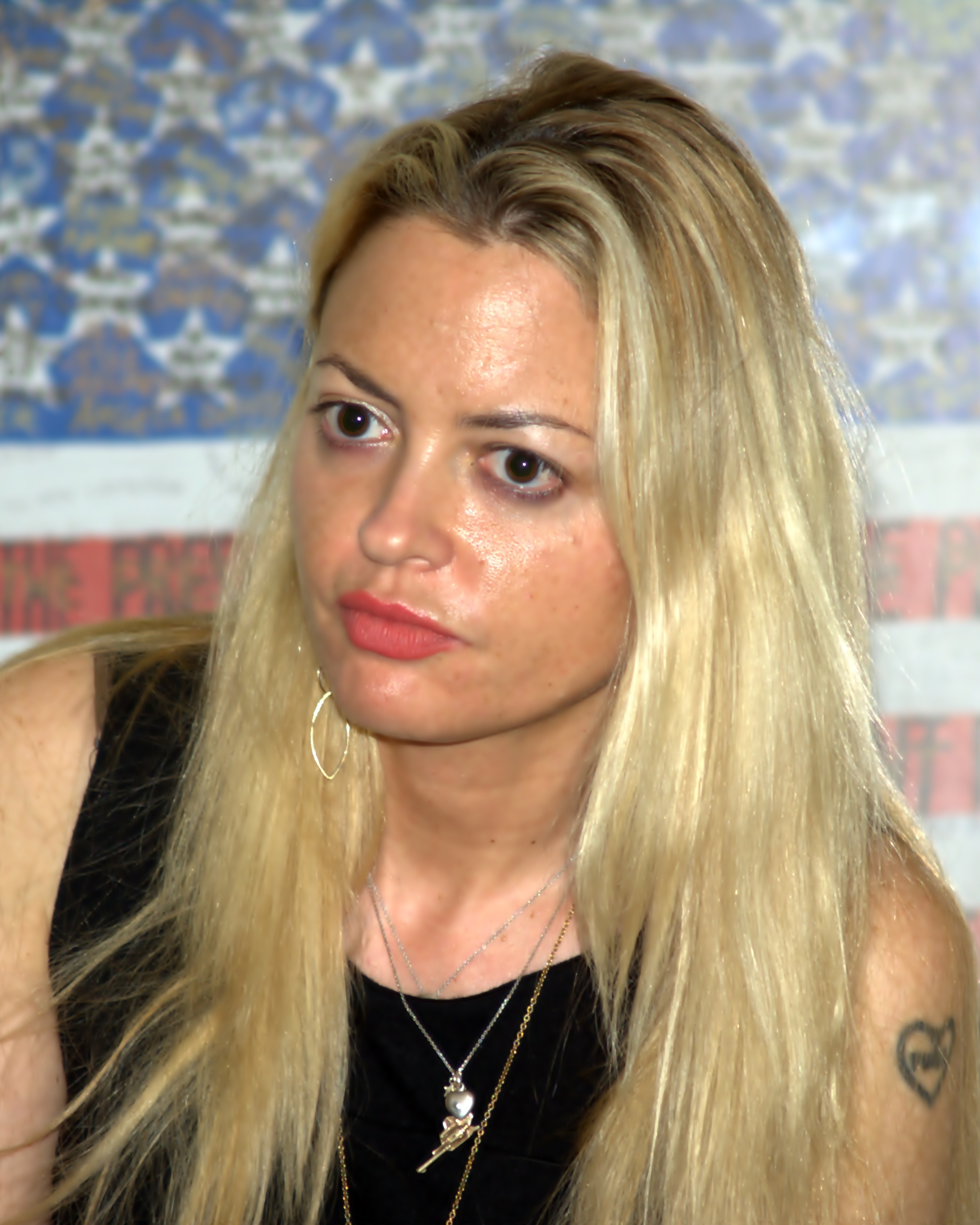
Writer Elizabeth Wurtzel '08

- Renata Adler (1979), novelist, staff writer for The New Yorker, and film critic for The New York Times
- Joseph Amiel (1962), writer of popular fiction
- Aditi Banerjee, co-author and editor of Invading the Sacred
- Michael Barone (1969), conservative political analyst, pundit, and journalist; principal author of The Almanac of American Politics
- Emily Bazelon (2000), staff writer, The New York Times Magazine, senior editor of Slate Magazine
- Chesa Boudin (2011), progressive writer
- Lan Cao, novelist, author of Monkey Bridge and The Lotus and the Storm
- Stephen Carter (1979), novelist
- Ken Chen, poet
- Bob Cohn, executive editor of Wired
- Lanny Davis (1970), political commentator and author of Scandal: How "Gotcha" Politics Is Destroying America
- Nelson Antonio Denis (1980), editorial director of El Diario/La Prensa, former member of the New York State Assembly'
- Heidi W. Durrow (1995), novelist
- Ronan Farrow (2009), contributor to The New Yorker and Pulitzer Prize winner
- Craig Forman, foreign correspondent and bureau chief for The Wall Street Journal
- Jack Fuller, Pulitzer Prize-winning journalist and president of the Tribune Company
- Robin Goldstein (2002), food and wine critic
- Linda Greenhouse (M.S.L. 1978), Supreme Court correspondent for The New York Times
- Adam Haslett (2003), short story writer
- Julie Hilden (1992), novelist
- Laura Chapman Hruska, novelist and co-founder and editor-in-chief of Soho Press
- Jamil Jivani (2013), author and politician
- Bruce Judson (1984), author of business and public policy books
- Jonathan Kay (1997), editor-in-chief of The Walrus
- Patrick Radden Keefe, staff writer for The New Yorker
- Ernest Knaebel (1896, LL.M. 1897), 11th Reporter of Decisions of the Supreme Court of the United States
- David Lat (1999), founder and managing editor of Above the Law, a blog about the legal profession
- Edward Lazarus (1987), author of the non-fiction book Closed Chambers
- Adam Liptak (1988), Supreme Court correspondent for The New York Times
- He Li (2003), Chinese-language poet
- Walter Lord (1948), author of the A Night to Remember
- Daniyal Mueenuddin (1996), short story writer
- Victor Navasky (1959), editor and publisher of The Nation; chairman of the Columbia Journalism Review
- Viveca Novak (M.S.L.), political correspondent for Time
- David Orr (1999), poet
- Matthew Pearl, novelist
- Daniel Pink, author
- Gretchen Rubin (1995), author
- Charlie Savage (2003), reporter for The New York Times
- Luiza Savage, Washington bureau chief, Maclean's magazine
- Robert B. Silvers (did not graduate), co-founder and editor of The New York Review of Books
- David Stewart (1978), non-fiction writer
- Julius Taranto (2016), novelist
- Alina Tugend (M.S.L.), columnist for The New York Times
- Qian Julie Wang (2012), author
- Clement Wood, poet
- Elizabeth Wurtzel (2008), author of the memoir Prozac Nation
- Monica Youn, poet

== Military ==
- Alexander T. Hawthorn (did not graduate), Confederate States Army general
- Edward J. Stackpole (1915), U.S. Army major general
- Alfred Terry, general of the Union Army during the American Civil War

President Bill Clinton '73

== Politics ==
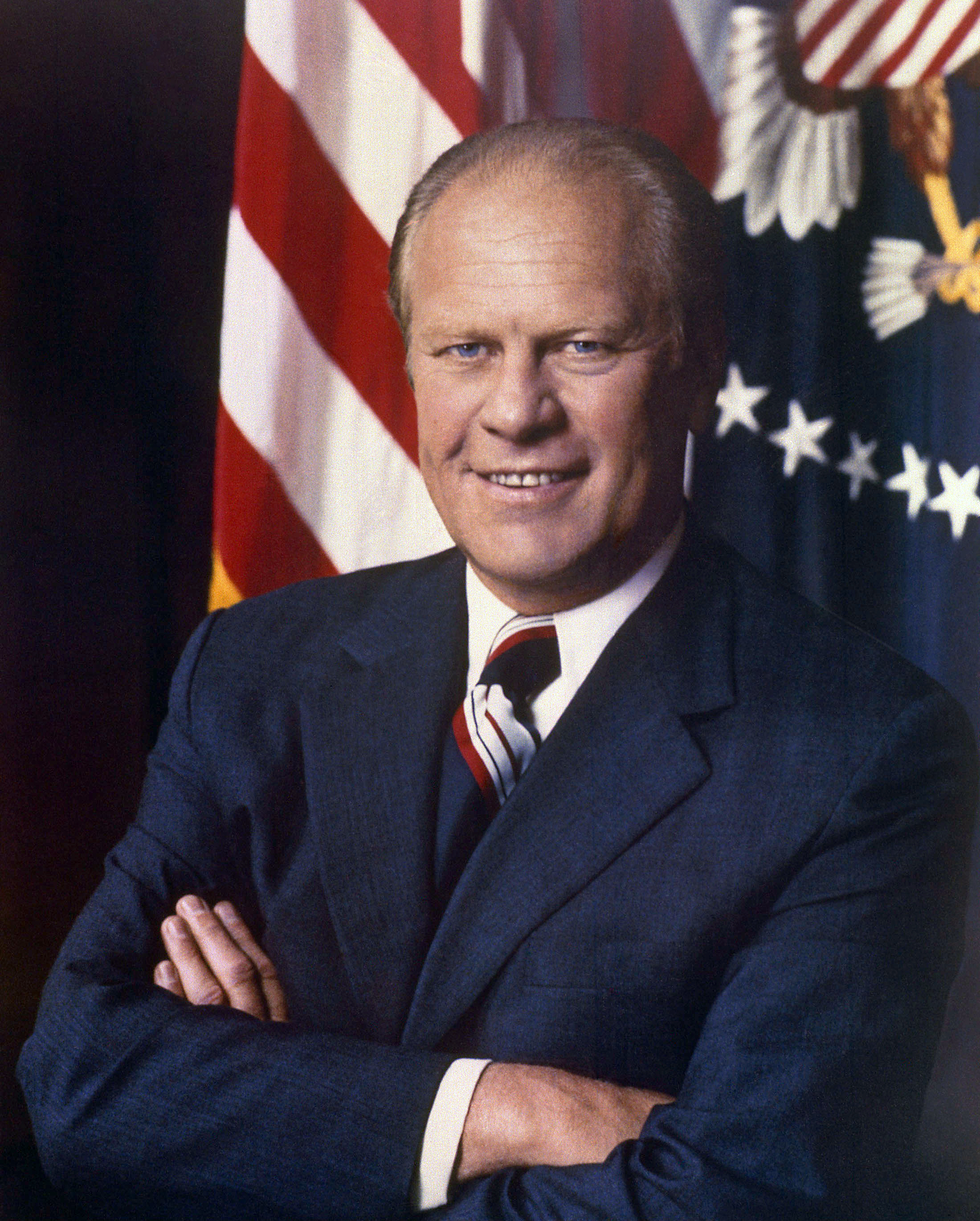
President Gerald Ford '41

=== U.S. presidents ===
- Bill Clinton (1973), president of the United States
- Gerald Ford (1941), president of the United States

=== U.S. vice presidents ===
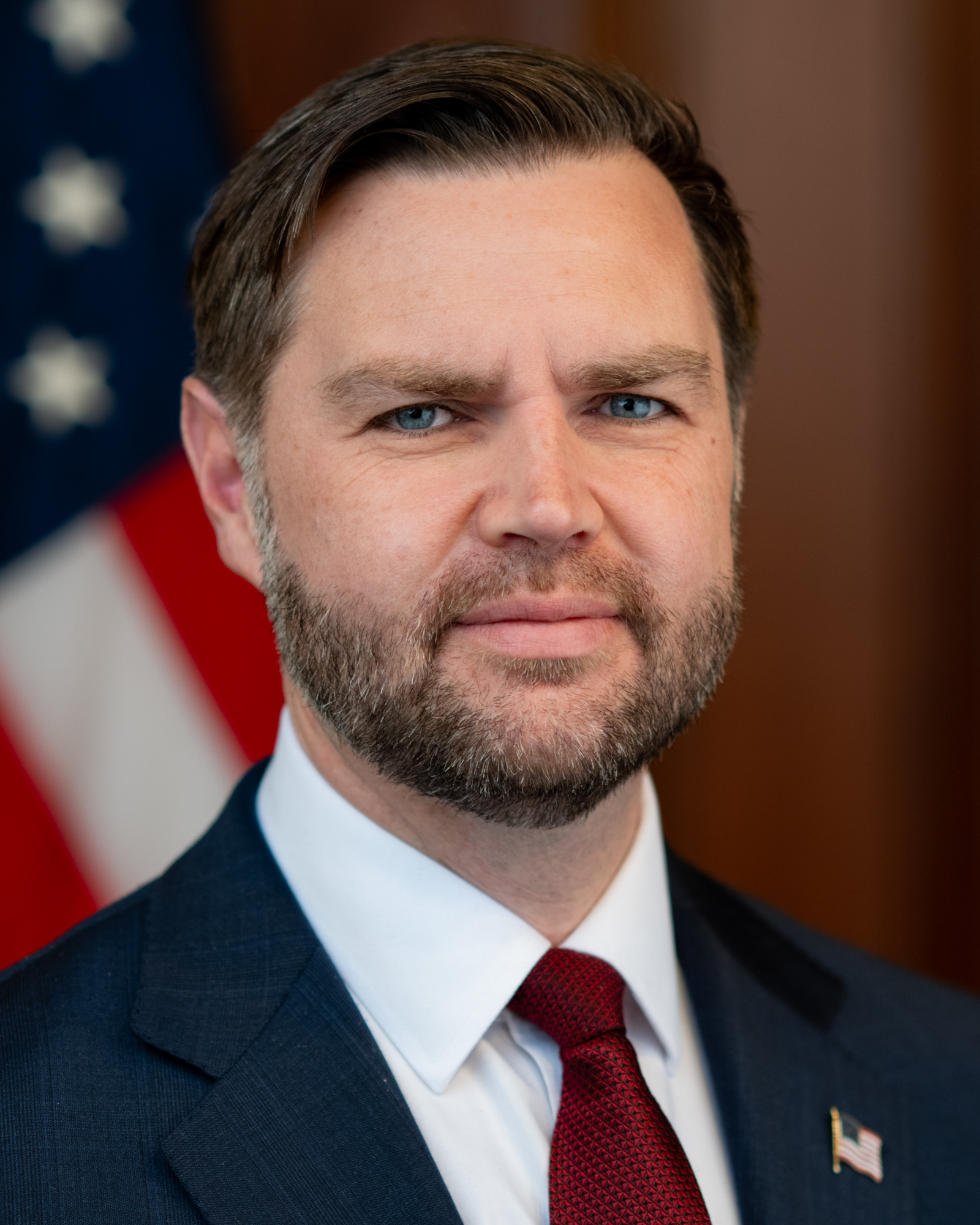
Vice President JD Vance '13

- JD Vance (2013), vice president of the United States

=== U.S. cabinet ===
- Daniel P. Driscoll (2014), secretary of the Army
- Clifford Alexander Jr. (1958), secretary of the Army
- Alex Azar (1991), secretary of health and human services
- John Bryson (1969), secretary of commerce
- Hillary Clinton (1973), United States secretary of state
- Richard Danzig (1971), secretary of the Navy
- Henry H. Fowler (1932), secretary of the treasury
- Gordon Gray (1933), secretary of the Army
- Carla Anderson Hills (1958), secretary of housing and urban development
- John King Jr., United States secretary of education
- Victor H. Metcalf (1876), United States Department of Commerce and Labor, secretary of the Navy
- Gina Raimondo (1998), secretary of commerce
- Robert Reich (1973), secretary of labor
- Stanley Rogers Resor (1942), secretary of the Army
- Robert Rubin (1964), secretary of the treasury
- Gene Sperling (1985), director of the National Economic Council
- Jake Sullivan (2003), national security advisor
- Alphonso Taft (1838), secretary of war
- Cyrus Vance (1942), secretary of state
- Christopher A. Wray (1992), director of the Federal Bureau of Investigation
- Eugene M. Zuckert (1936), secretary of the Air Force

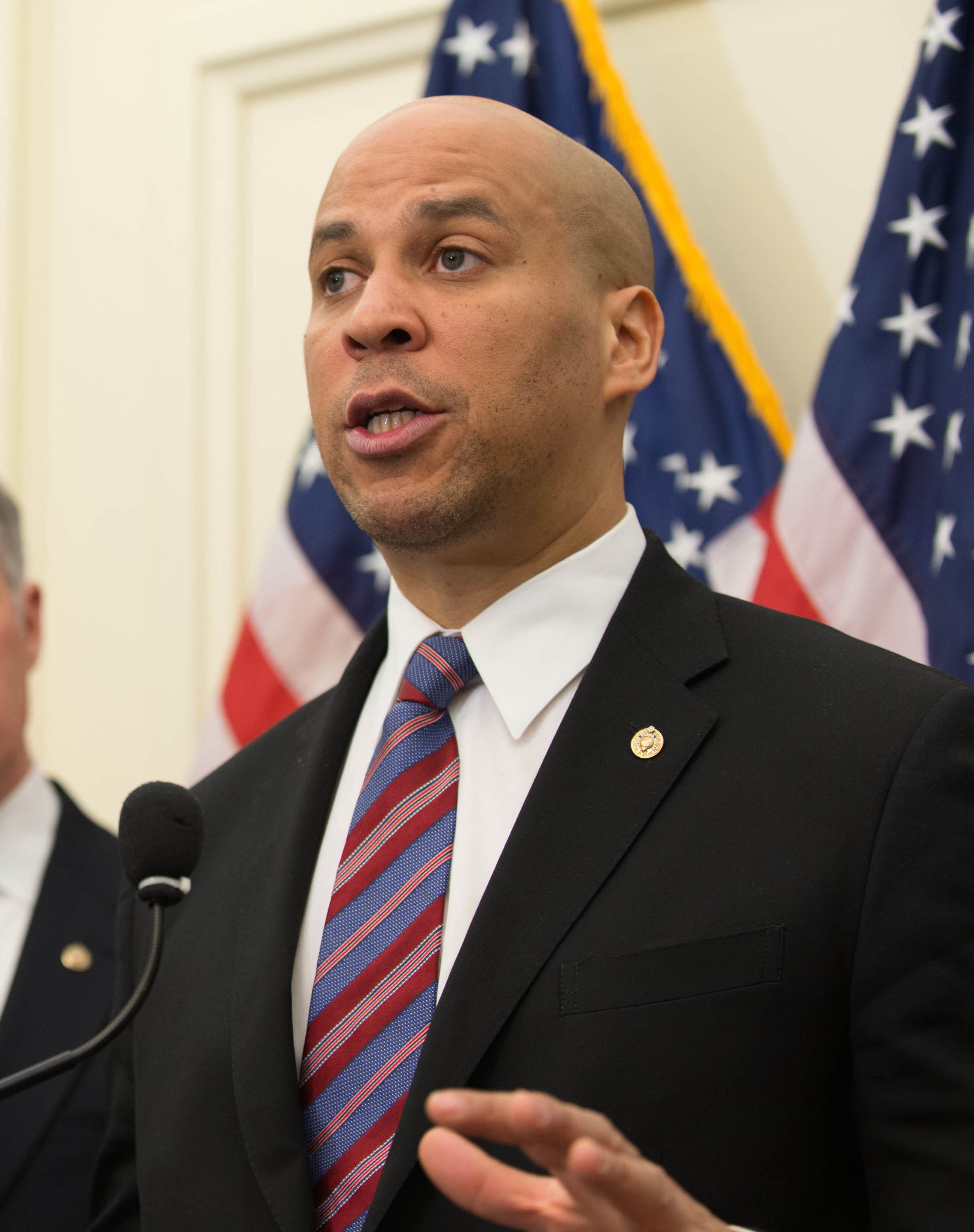
Senator Cory Booker '97

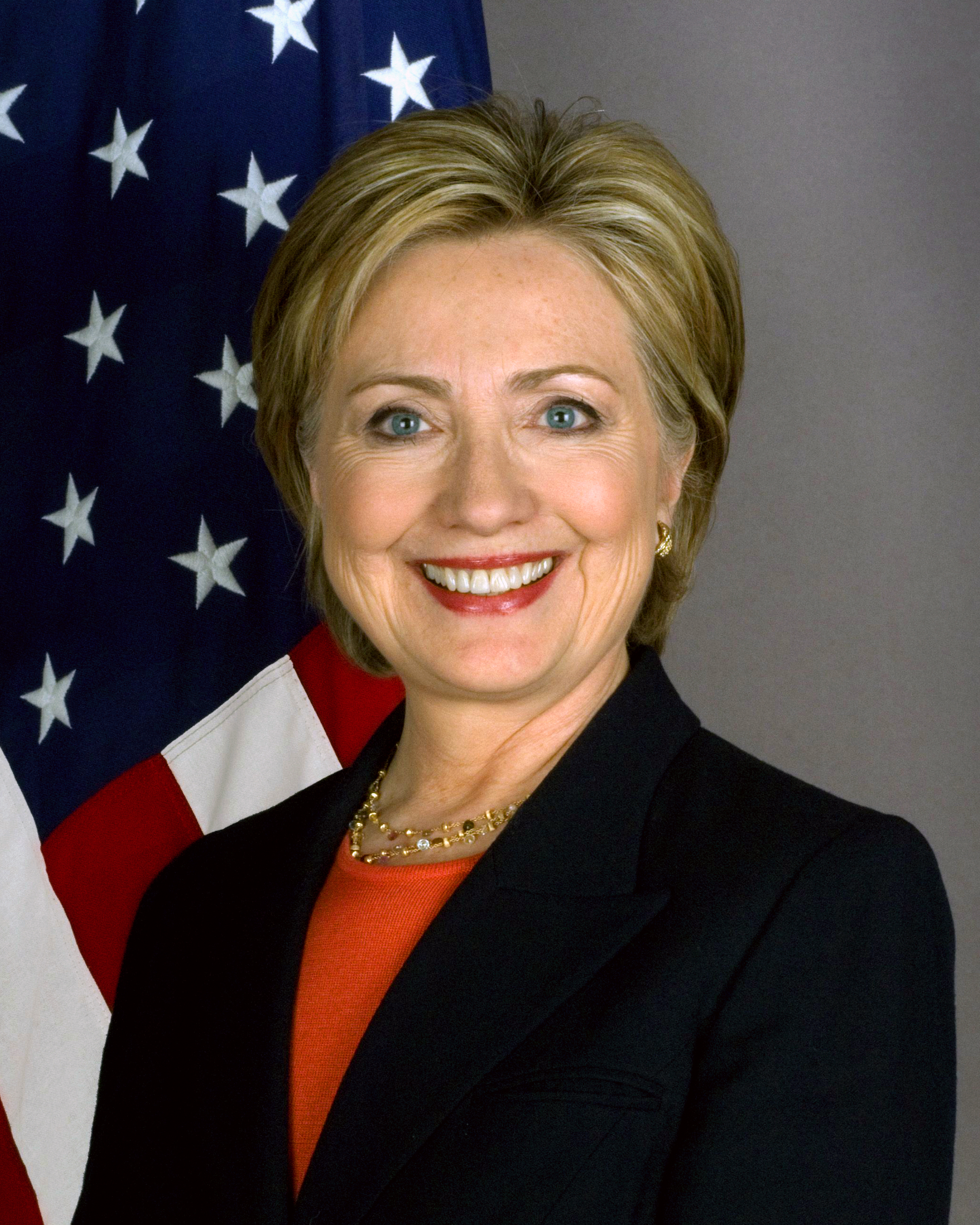
Secretary of State Hillary Clinton '73

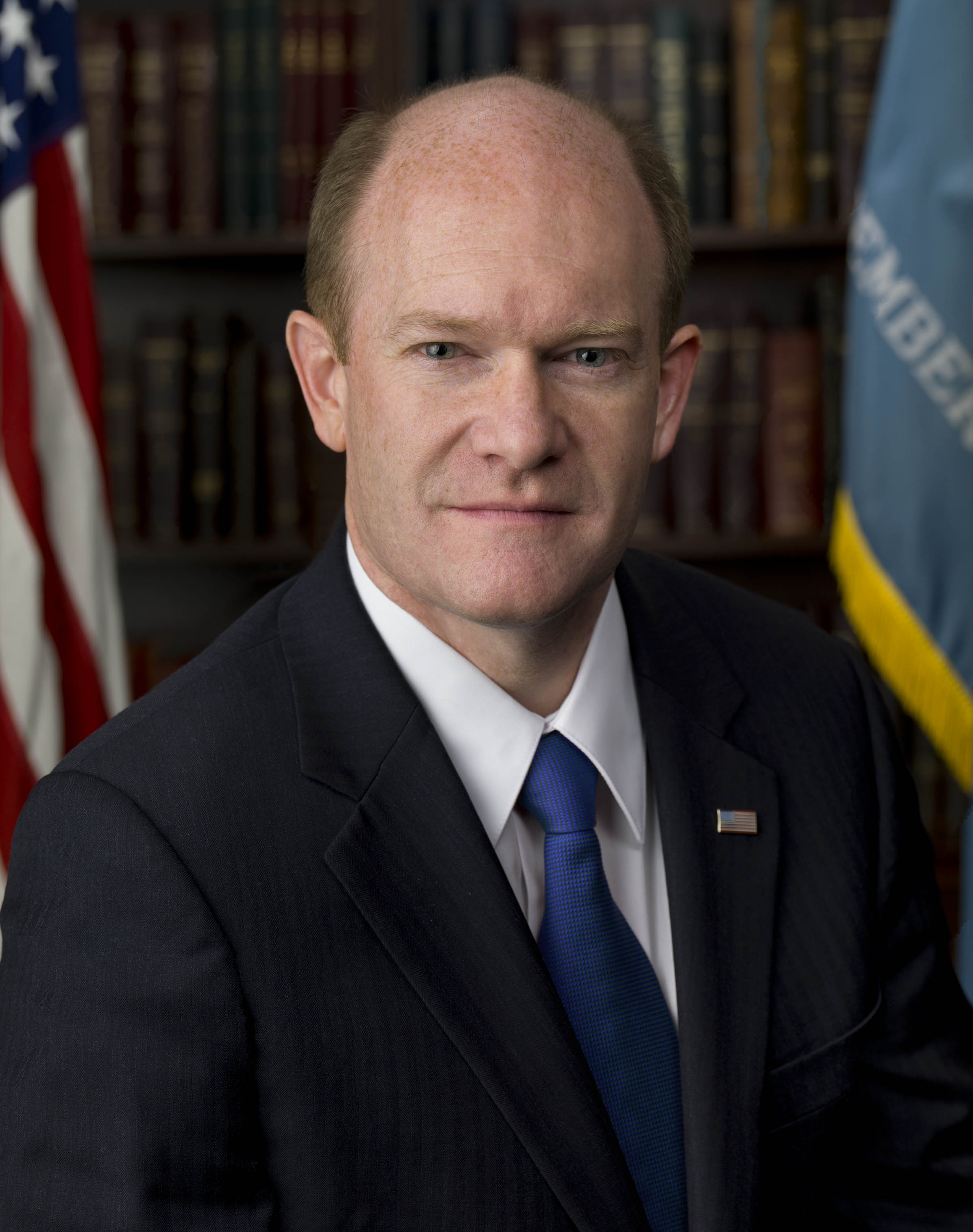
Senator Chris Coons '92

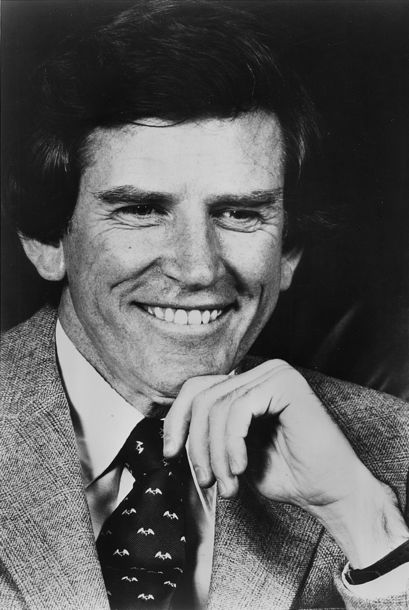
Senator Gary Hart '64

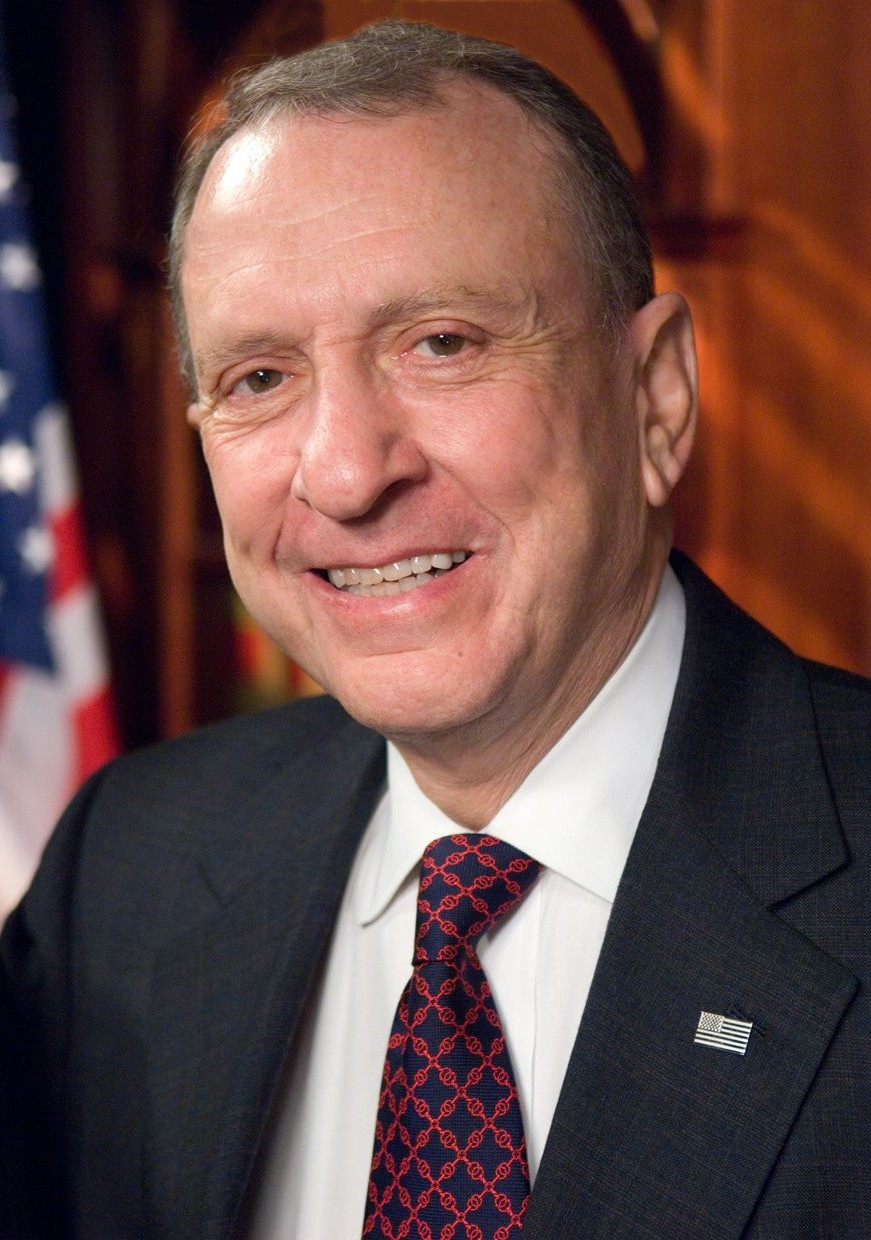
Senator Arlen Specter '56

=== U.S. Senate ===
- Raymond E. Baldwin (1921), U.S. senator from Connecticut
- Thomas F. Bayard, Jr. (1893), U.S. senator from Delaware
- Judah P. Benjamin (did not graduate), U.S. senator from Louisiana, secretary of state of the Confederate States
- Michael Bennet (1993), U.S. senator from Colorado
- Richard Blumenthal (1973), U.S. senator from Connecticut
- Cory Booker (1997), U.S. senator from New Jersey, mayor of Newark, New Jersey
- James L. Buckley (1950), U.S. senator from New York
- Hillary Clinton (1973), U.S. senator from New York
- Chris Coons (1992), U.S. senator from Delaware
- John A. Danaher (1922), U.S. senator from Connecticut
- John Danforth (1961), U.S. senator from Missouri
- David Davis (1835), U.S. senator from Illinois
- Thomas J. Dodd (1933), U.S. senator from Connecticut
- Peter H. Dominick (1940), U.S. senator from Colorado
- Charles Goodell (1951), U.S. senator from New York
- Gary Hart (1964), U.S. senator from Colorado
- Josh Hawley (2006), U.S. senator from Missouri
- Estes Kefauver (1927), U.S. senator from Tennessee
- Alfred B. Kittredge, U.S. senator from South Dakota
- Joseph Lieberman (1967), U.S. senator from Connecticut
- Augustine Lonergan (1902), U.S. senator from Connecticut
- Brien McMahon (1927), U.S. senator from Connecticut
- Trusten Polk (1831), U.S. senator from Missouri
- Julius Rockwell (1826), U.S. senator from Massachusetts
- Arlen Specter (1956), U.S. senator from Pennsylvania
- Paul Tsongas (1967), U.S. senator from Massachusetts
- Harris Wofford (1954), U.S. senator from Pennsylvania

=== U.S. House of Representatives ===
- Lewis Beach (1856), U.S. representative from New York
- Carroll L. Beedy (1906), U.S. representative from Maine
- Jackson Edward Betts (1929), U.S. representative from Ohio
- Jonathan Brewster Bingham (1939), U.S. representative from New York
- Clay Stone Briggs (1899), U.S. representative from Texas
- C. Pope Caldwell (1899), U.S. representative from New York
- Charles T. Canady (1979), U.S. representative from Florida
- James Colgate Cleveland (1948), U.S. representative from New Hampshire
- Thomas C. Coffin, U.S. representative from Idaho
- Sam Coppersmith (1982), U.S. representative from Arizona
- Albert W. Cretella (1921), U.S. representative from Connecticut
- Peter Deutsch (1982), U.S. representative from Florida
- Allen Ertel (1965), U.S. representative from Pennsylvania
- Elizabeth Esty (1985), U.S. representative from Connecticut
- Richard P. Freeman (1894), U.S. representative from Connecticut
- Peter Frelinghuysen Jr. (1941), U.S. representative from New Jersey
- Foster Furcolo (1936), U.S. representative from Massachusetts
- Edwin W. Higgins (1897), U.S. representative from Connecticut
- Peter Hoagland (1968), U.S. representative from Nebraska
- Colin M. Ingersoll, U.S. representative from Connecticut
- Donald J. Irwin (1954), U.S. representative from Connecticut
- Stephen Wright Kellogg (1848), U.S. representative from Connecticut
- Ro Khanna (2001), U.S. representative from California
- Kevin Kiley (2012), U.S. representative from California
- Franklin F. Korell (did not graduate), U.S. representative from Oregon
- William Lemke, U.S. representative from North Dakota
- John Lindsay (1948), U.S. representative from New York
- Dwight Loomis (1847), U.S. representative from Connecticut
- Allard K. Lowenstein (1954), U.S. representative from New York
- John Miller (1964), U.S. representative from Washington
- Bruce Morrison (1973), U.S. representative from Connecticut
- Eleanor Holmes Norton (1964), U.S. representative from Washington, D.C.
- Miner G. Norton (1880), U.S. representative from Ohio
- George M. O'Brien (1947), U.S. representative from Illinois
- Tom Perriello (2001), U.S. representative from Virginia
- Aaron F. Perry, U.S. representative from Ohio
- William Scranton, U.S. representative from Pennsylvania
- David Skaggs (1967), U.S. representative from Colorado
- J. Joseph Smith (1927), U.S. representative from Connecticut
- Wint Smith (1922), U.S. representative from Kansas
- John Spratt (1969), U.S. representative from South Carolina
- Joseph E. Talbot (1925), U.S. representative from Connecticut
- Frank Tejeda (LL.M. 1989), U.S. representative from Texas
- John Q. Tilson (1893), U.S. representative from Connecticut
- William H. Upson (1845), U.S. representative from Ohio
- Stuyvesant Wainwright (1947), U.S. representative from New York
- Mel Watt (1970), U.S. representative from North Carolina
- Washington F. Willcox (1862), U.S. representative from Connecticut
- David Wu (1982), U.S. representative from Oregon
- Dick Zimmer (1969), U.S. representative from New Jersey

=== Governors ===
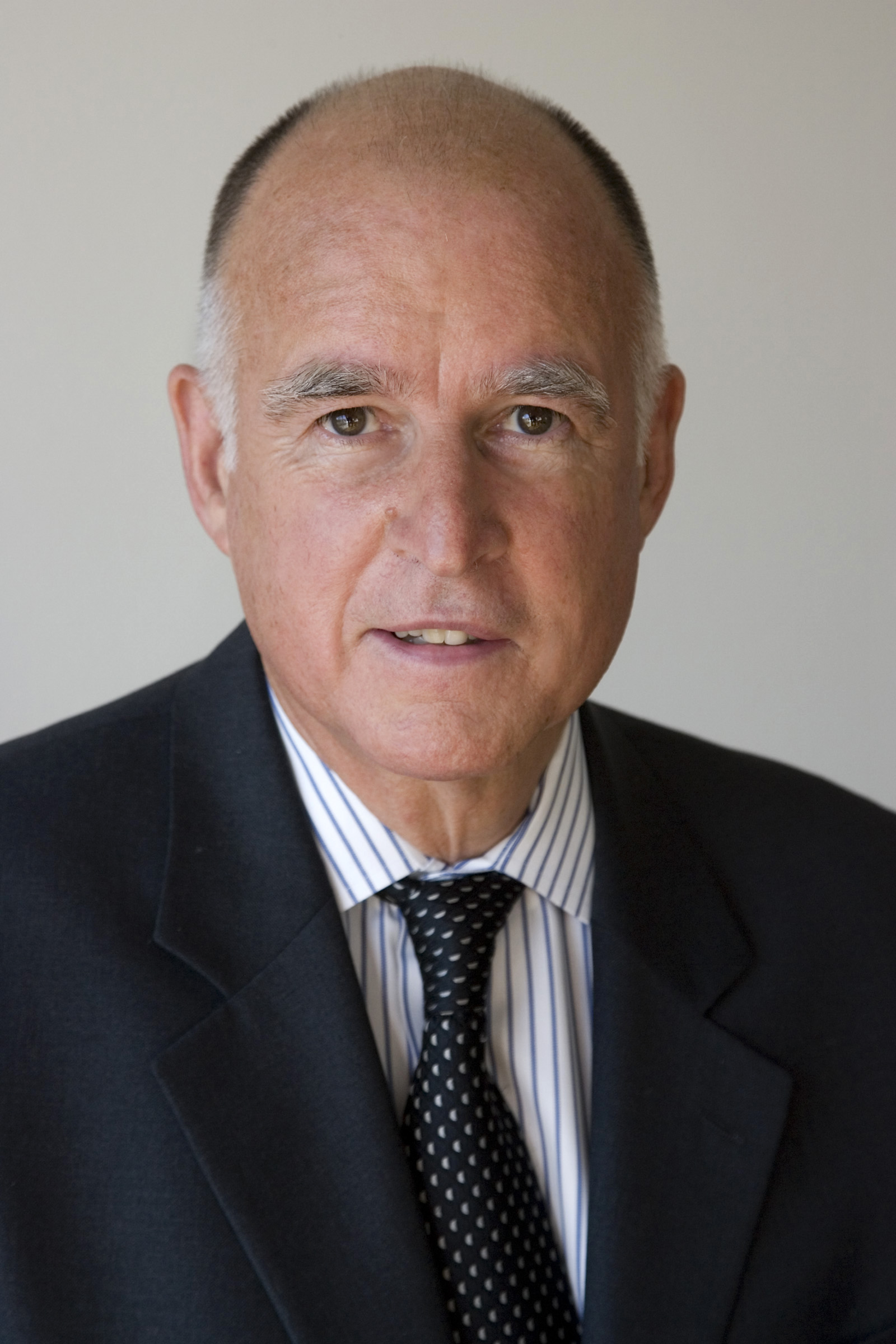
Governor of California Jerry Brown '64

- Jerry Brown (1964), governor of California
- Foster Furcolo (1936), governor of Massachusetts
- Bibb Graves (1896), governor of Alabama
- Henry Baldwin Harrison, governor of Connecticut
- William W. Hoppin, governor of Rhode Island
- William J. Mills (1877), governor of New Mexico Territory
- Gina Raimondo (1998), governor of Rhode Island, United States secretary of commerce
- Raymond P. Shafer (1941), governor of Pennsylvania

=== State politicians ===
- Peter H. Behr (1940), California State Senate
- Asa S. Bloomer (1916), Vermont House of Representatives and Vermont Senate
- Eliphalet Adams Bulkeley (1824), Connecticut State Senate, Connecticut House of Representatives
- John A. Busterud (1949), California State Assembly
- Wilson Hart Clark (1845), Connecticut State Senate
- Nelson Antonio Denis (1980), New York State Assembly
- Matthew Denn (1991), lieutenant governor of Delaware
- Tilton E. Doolittle (1846), speaker of the House of the Connecticut House of Representatives and United States attorney for the district of Connecticut
- John R. Dunne (1954), New York Senate
- Daniel C. Esty (1986), commissioner of the Connecticut Department of Energy and Environmental Protection
- Shirley Adele Field, Oregon House of Representatives
- Tom Foley, Pennsylvania secretary of labor and industry
- Ammi Giddings, Connecticut Senate
- Harrison J. Goldin (1960), New York Senate
- Cyrus Habib, 16th lieutenant governor of Washington, Washington State Senate, Washington House of Representatives
- L. W. Housel (1900), Connecticut House of Representatives
- Michael Johnston, Colorado Senate
- Daniel Kagan, Colorado House of Representatives
- Jeff King, Kansas Senate
- Kris Kobach (1995), secretary of state of Kansas, Kansas attorney general
- John Latta (1859), lieutenant governor of Pennsylvania
- Frederick Lippitt (1946), Rhode Island House of Representatives
- J. Edward Meyer (1961), Connecticut Senate
- Robert W. Naylor (1969), California State Assembly; chair of the California Republican Party
- Charles R. Nesbitt (1947), attorney general of Oklahoma, Oklahoma secretary of energy
- Larry Obhof, president of the Ohio Senate
- Edwin Archer Randolph, Virginia House of Delegates, Virginia Senate; first African-American to graduate from the law school
- James Paull, president of the West Virginia Senate
- Jamie Pedersen, majority leader of the Washington State Senate, Washington House of Representatives
- Charles B. Perry, speaker of the Wisconsin State Assembly
- Shirley Adelson Siegel (1941), solicitor general of New York
- Bryan Townsend, Delaware Senate
- Francis W. Treadway (1892), 30th lieutenant governor of Ohio
- Ralph E. Van Norstrand (1961), minority leader of the Connecticut General Assembly; speaker of the Connecticut House of Representatives
- Anthony Van Wyck (1844), Wisconsin State Senate
- Portia Wu (1998), secretary of the Maryland Department of Labor

=== Local politics ===
- Luke Bronin (2006), mayor of Hartford, Connecticut
- Richard Buery (1997), deputy mayor of New York City
- George Williamson Crawford (1903), second Black graduate of the Law School and corporation counsel of the City of New Haven
- David Hansell (1983), commissioner of the New York City Administration for Children's Services
- Bruce Harris, mayor of Chatham Borough, New Jersey
- Robert J. Harris, mayor of Ann Arbor, Michigan
- John Lindsay (1948), mayor of New York City
- Charles Phelps Taft II (1921), mayor of Cincinnati
- Caroline Van Zile (2012), solicitor general of Washington, D.C.

=== Other U.S. offices ===
- Meade Alcorn, chairman of the Republican National Committee
- Dillon Anderson (1929), National Security advisor
- Joe Andrew (1985), chairman of the Democratic National Committee
- Michael Barr (1992), assistant secretary for Financial Institutions of the United States Department of the Treasury
- Rubén Berríos (1961), Senate of Puerto Rico
- Matthew Berry, general counsel to the United States House of Representatives
- Alan Bersin (born 1946), U.S. attorney for the Southern District of California, California secretary of education, commissioner of US Customs and Border Protection, US Department of Homeland Security secretary for International Affairs, and INTERPOL vice president
- Boris Bershteyn (2004), associate White House counsel
- William L. Borden (1947), executive director of United States Congress Joint Committee on Atomic Energy
- Beth Brinkmann (1985), assistant to the U.S. solicitor general
- Antonia Handler Chayes (did not graduate), U.S. under secretary of the Air Force
- William S. Culbertson (1910), president of the United States Tariff Commission
- Michael Harrington, chairman of Democratic Socialists of America
- William Thaddeus Coleman III, general counsel of the Army
- Brian Deese, director of the National Economic Council
- Mathea Falco (1968), assistant secretary of state for international narcotics and law enforcement affairs
- Roswell Gilpatric (1931), deputy secretary of defense
- Fred T. Goldberg Jr. (1973), commissioner of Internal Revenue
- Stephen Hadley (1972), national security advisor
- Coleman Hicks (1968), general counsel of the Navy
- Steven S. Honigman (1973), general counsel of the Navy
- Jerry MacArthur Hultin (1972), under secretary of the Navy
- Reed Hundt (1974), chairman of the Federal Communications Commission
- Rashad Hussain (2005), U.S. special envoy to the Organisation of Islamic Cooperation
- Harrison Loesch (1939), assistant secretary of the Interior
- Malcolm A. MacIntyre, U.S. under secretary of the Air Force
- Burke Marshall (1951), U.S. assistant attorney general for the Civil Rights Division of the United States Department of Justice
- Joe Miller (1995), United States senator from Alaska
- Roderic L. O'Connor (1947), assistant secretary of state for security and consular affairs
- Stephen A. Oxman, assistant secretary of state for European and Canadian affairs
- Troy A. Paredes, commissioner of the Securities and Exchange Commission
- Michael Pertschuk (1959), chairman of the Federal Trade Commission
- Randal Quarles (1984), under secretary for domestic finance
- Eugene Rostow (1937), under secretary of state for political affairs
- Usha Vance (2013), Second Lady of the United States
- Kevin K. Washburn (1993), assistant secretary for Indian affairs
- Neal S. Wolin, deputy secretary of the treasury
- R. James Woolsey Jr. (1968), 16th director of Central Intelligence
- Adam Yarmolinsky, political appointee who served in numerous capacities in the Kennedy, Johnson, and Carter administrations
- David Yassky, New York City Council

=== Non-United States political figures ===
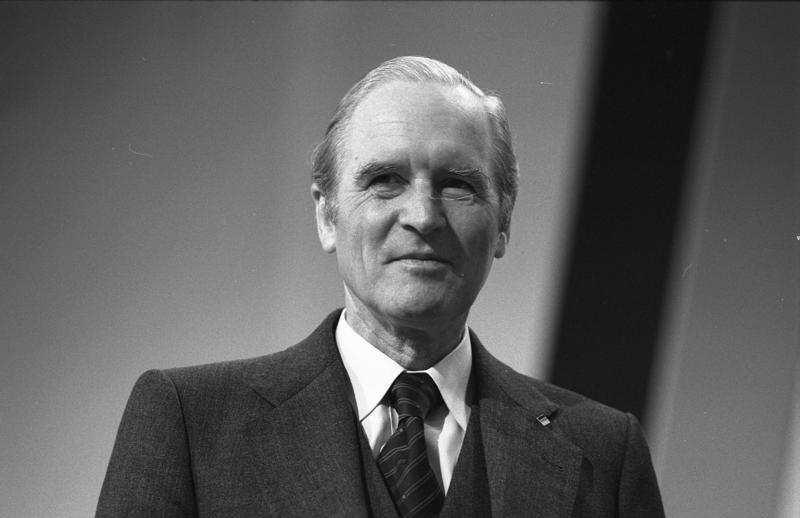
President of Germany Karl Carstens '49

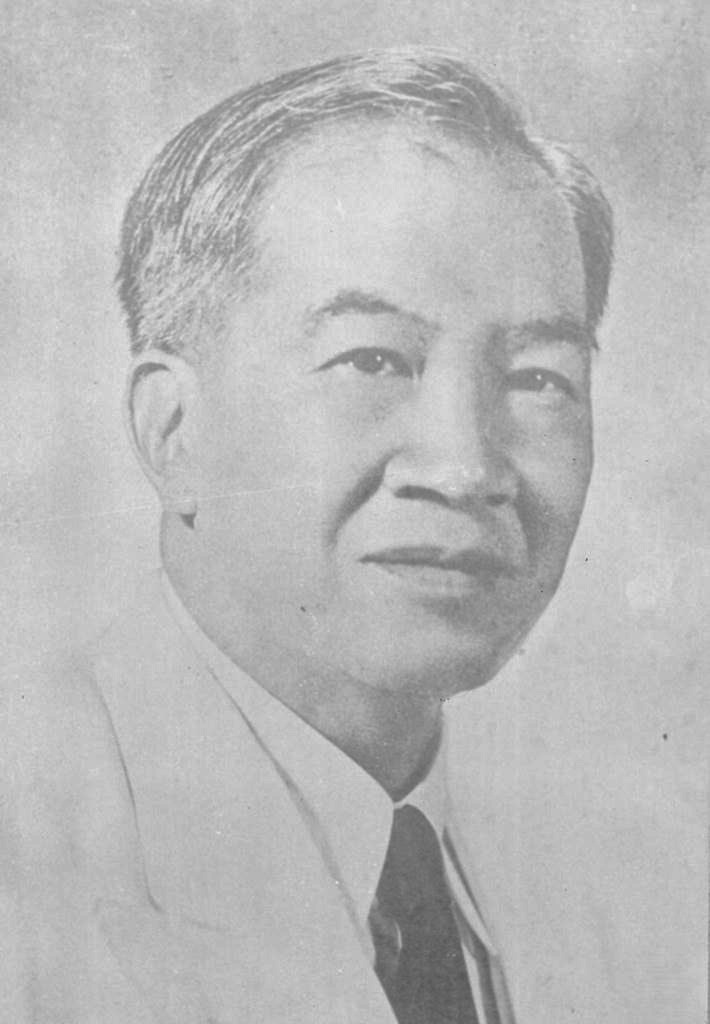
President of the Philippines José P. Laurel '20

==== Heads of state ====
- Karl Carstens (LL.M. 1949), president of Germany
- Jose P. Laurel (J.S.D. 1920), president of the Philippines
- Salvador Laurel (J.S.D. 1960), vice president of the Philippines, prime minister of the Philippines
- Peter Mutharika (LL.M., J.S.D.), president of the Republic of Malawi, former minister of foreign affairs of Malawi

==== Other political figures ====
- Ron Atkey (LL.M. 1966), House of Commons of Canada
- Kwesi Botchwey (LL.M.), Ministry of Finance and Economic Planning (Ghana)
- Irwin Cotler (LL.M. 1966), minister of justice (Canada)
- Wan Exiang (LL.M. 1987), vice chairperson of the National People's Congress
- Francisco Afan Delgado (LL.M. 1909), senator of the Philippines
- Philip S. Deloria, founder and 1st secretary-general of the World Council of Indigenous Peoples
- Eoghan Fitzsimons (LL.M. 1966), attorney general of Ireland
- David Howarth (LL.M. 1983), member of Parliament (United Kingdom)
- S. Jayakumar (LL.M. 1966), senior minister of Singapore
- Antonio La Viña, undersecretary of the Department of Environment and Natural Resources of the Philippines
- Stavros Lambrinidis (1988), member of the European Parliament; vice president of the European Parliament, minister for Foreign Affairs (Greece); European Union special representative for Human Rights, European Union ambassador to the U.S.
- Jovito Salonga (J.S.D. 1949), president of the Senate of the Philippines
- Lebbeus R. Wilfley (1892), attorney general of the Philippines
- Michael Yaki, commissioner of the United States Commission on Civil Rights

=== International organization figures ===
- Stavros Lambrinidis (J.D. 1988), European Union special representative for Human Rights
- Josefina Phodaca-Ambrosio (LL.M. 1957), first Asian and only Filipino to become president of Federacion Internacional de Abogadas
- Johan C. Verbeke (LL.M. 1978), head of the United Nations Observer Mission in Georgia

== Sports ==
- Rodney Aller, masters skier
- Al Hessberg (1941), college football player
- Fay Moulton, Olympic sprinter and college football player
- William G. Norton, college football coach
- Jim O'Rourke (1887), Major League Baseball player and manager
- Ted St. Germaine (1914), professional football player in the National Football League
- Vanessa Selbst (2012), professional poker player
- Tom Shevlin (1906), four-year track star; All-American end and captain
- Fay Vincent (1963), 8th Commissioner of Major League Baseball

== Other ==
- Dyke Brown (1941), founder of The Athenian School
- John Anthony Flood, sociologist, legal academic, consultant, author
- Richard Green (1987), psychiatrist specializing in homosexuality and transsexualism
- Stewart Rhodes (2004), founder of the Oath Keepers, convicted for seditious conspiracy in the January 6 United States Capitol attack
- Pat Robertson (1955), televangelist and founder of Regent University
- Sherman Day Thacher (1886), founder of The Thacher School
- Yona Reiss (1991), chief rabbinical judge of the Chicago Rabbinical Council

== Fictitional alumni ==
- Arthur Branch, character on the TV series Law & Order
- Alexis Davis, character on the TV series General Hospital
- Greg Foster, character on the TV series The Young and the Restless
- Amy Gardner, character on the TV series The West Wing
- Josh Lyman, character on the TV series The West Wing
- Jordan McDeere, character on the TV series Studio 60 on the Sunset Strip
- Selina Meyer, character on the TV series Veep
- Wayne Palmer, character on the TV series 24
- Bruce Wayne, alter ego of Batman, as disclosed in Detective Comics 439
