= Meltsner =

Meltsner is a surname. Notable people with the surname include:

- Michael Meltsner (born 1937), American lawyer and law professor
- Paul Meltsner (1905–1966), American artist
