= Stuart L. Deutsch =

Stuart L. Deutsch was Dean and Professor of Law at Rutgers School of Law–Newark from 1999 to 2009. Upon stepping down as dean, he was awarded the title of University Professor in recognition of his service as dean.

Formerly a professor of law, co-director of the Program in Environmental and Energy Law, and founding director of the Institute for Science, Law, and Technology at the Chicago-Kent College of Law at the Illinois Institute of Technology, he also served as interim dean in 1996–97, and as associate dean for academic affairs and associate dean for interdisciplinary programs. Deutsch's expertise at that time, prior to his becoming a university administrator, was in the fields of environmental law and land use. He authored Deutsch's Illinois Environmental Laws Annotated, and for 18 years was coeditor of Land Use and Environment Law Review. He also practiced law in New York City, even though he never received his law license from the State of New York. Deutsch earned his J.D. from Yale Law School in 1969, and his LL.M. from Harvard Law School in 1974, where he was a Fellow in Law and the Humanities.

Deutsch has been a member of bar and national organization committees concerning the legal profession and legal education. These include the New Jersey Supreme Court Commission on Professionalism, the New Jersey Institute for Continuing Legal Education, and the American Bar Association`s Section of Legal Education and Admissions to the Bar Technology Committee.

Deutsch has served on the board of directors of the Chicago Audubon Society; as a hearing officer for the Chicago Commission on Human Relations, where he presided over more than 20 cases and a dozen full hearings; as chair of the North Suburban Fair Housing Center; and as chair of the Interfaith Housing Development Corporation. He was a pro bono attorney for the Leadership Council for Metropolitan Open Communities, the umbrella fair housing organization in the Chicago metropolitan area.
