= David E. Pozen =

David Pozen is the Charles Keller Beekman Professor of Law at Columbia University, where he specializes in constitutional law, information law, and nonprofit law. Pozen has written extensively in the area of constitutional law.

== Education and career ==
Pozen graduated from the Roxbury Latin School. He received a Bachelor of Arts degree from Yale College in 2002, a Master of Science degree from Oxford University in 2003, and a Juris Doctor degree from Yale Law School in 2007.

From 2010 to 2012, Pozen served as special advisor to Harold Hongju Koh at the U.S. Department of State. Previously, he was a law clerk for Justice John Paul Stevens on the U.S. Supreme Court and Judge Merrick Garland on the U.S. Court of Appeals for the District of Columbia Circuit, as well as a special assistant to Ted Kennedy on the Senate Judiciary Committee.

Pozen has published dozens of articles, essays, and book chapters and edited two volumes for Columbia University Press, Troubling Transparency: The History and Future of Freedom of Information in 2018 (with Michael Schudson) and The Perilous Public Square: Structural Threats to Free Expression Today in 2020. In 2019, Pozen received the Early Career Scholars Medal from the American Law Institute.

In April 2024, Pozen's book, The Constitution of the War on Drugs, was published. Its publisher calls it an "[a]uthoritative and first-of-its-kind critical constitutional history of the 'war on drugs' [that] [s]hows how the war on drugs was shaped by constitutional law, and how constitutional law was shaped by the war on drugs."

== Works ==
Pozen's works as of 2022 include:

- “Structural Biases in Structural Constitutional Law,” (with Jonathan S. Gould), 97 NYU Law Review, 2022.
- “The Puzzles and Possibilities of Article V,” (with Thomas P. Schmidt), 121 Columbia Law Review, 2021.
- “Anti-Modalities,” (with Adam M. Samaha), 119 Michigan Law Review, 2021.
- “A Computational Analysis of Constitutional Polarization,” (with Eric L. Talley & Julian Nyarko), 105 Cornell Law Review, 2019.
- “A Skeptical View of Information Fiduciaries,” (with Lina M. Khan), 133 Harvard Law Review, 2019.
- “The Search for an Egalitarian First Amendment,” (with Jeremy K. Kessler), 118 Columbia Law Review, 2018.
- “Transparency's Ideological Drift,” 128 Yale Law Journal, 2018.
- “How Constitutional Norms Break Down,” (with Josh Chafetz), 65 UCLA Law Review, 2018.
- “Asymmetric Constitutional Hardball,” (with Joseph Fishkin), 118 Columbia Law Review, 2018.
- “Freedom of Information Beyond the Freedom of Information Act,” 165 University of Pennsylvania Law Review, 2017.
- “Working Themselves Impure: A Life Cycle Theory of Legal Theories,” (with Jeremy K. Kessler), 83 University of Chicago Law Review, 2016.
- “Constitutional Bad Faith,” 129 Harvard Law Review, 2016.
- “Privacy-Privacy Tradeoffs,” 83 University of Chicago Law Review, 2016.
- “Uncivil Obedience,” (with Jessica Bulman-Pozen), 115 Columbia Law Review, 2015.
- “Self-Help and the Separation of Powers,” 124 Yale Law Journal, 2014.
- “The Leaky Leviathan: Why the Government Condemns and Condones Unlawful Disclosures of Information,” 127 Harvard Law Review, 2013.

== See also ==
- Bibliography of the United States Constitution
