= Seth Green (executive) =

Seth Green assumed the position of Dean of the Graham School of Continuing Liberal and Professional Studies at University of Chicago in 2021. He previously served as the Founding Director of the Baumhart Center for Social Enterprise and Responsibility at loyloa University Chicago, an interdisciplinary center that explores how to harness the positive power of business strategy to build a better world. Prior to Loyola, Green led Youth & Opportunity United, a nonprofit that empowers low-income youth to realize post-secondary and life success. During his time at Y.O.U., Green oversaw the Campaign for Youth Opportunity that led to the organization's current state-of-the-art headquarters and youth center. Before Y.O.U., Green led two other social ventures and served as a consultant at McKinsey & Co.

Green has been a featured speaker at the U.S. House, U.S. Senate, World Bank, United Nations, Associated Press, and other leading institutions. He served as a facilitator at the Clinton Global Initiative and as a guest at the White House Summit. For his leadership, he received Search for Common Ground's award for International Understanding.

Green is a frequent contributor to the media, having served as a guest on C-SPAN's Washington Journal, the Montel Williams Show, CNN, and MSNBC, and written op-eds for the Christian Science Monitor and Miami Herald. In addition, his work with has been featured by hundreds of publications, including the New York Times, Washington Post, Associated Press, Chronicle of Higher Education, and Marie Claire.

A Marshall scholar, Green graduated summa cum laude from Princeton University and earned master's degrees in Development Studies from the London School of Economics and in Women's Studies from Oxford University. He completed a JD degree at Yale Law School, where he was named an Olin Fellow by the Center for Studies in Law, Economics, and Public Policy.
