= Steven Walt =

Law academic

Steven D. Walt (/wɔːlt/) is a law professor at the University of Virginia School of Law. He teaches courses on contracts, sales/commercial paper, legal philosophy, bankruptcy and secured transactions.

== Biography ==
Walt graduated cum laude with a B.A. from Kalamazoo College in 1976. Walt also holds an M.A. and Ph.D. in philosophy from the University of Chicago (received in 1978 and 1984, respectively).

He earned his J.D. from Yale Law School in 1988 and was an associate professor at the University of San Diego for three years. He joined the University of Virginia School of Law faculty after visiting for one year as a professor of law from the University of San Diego. He is currently the Percy Brown Jr., Professor of Law and John V. Ray Research Professor of Law at the University of Virginia School of Law.

He has received several academic awards, including a Whiting National Fellowship in the Humanities. In addition, he has been a visiting research scholar at Nuffield College, Oxford, and an Amoco Foundation Term Assistant Professor of Legal Studies at the Wharton School of the University of Pennsylvania. He is a member of the American Society for Political and Legal Philosophy.

== Publications ==
=== Books ===
- Gillette, Clayton P.; Walt, Steven D. (2015). Sales Law: Domestic and International (Concepts and Insights Series) (3rd ed.). Foundation Press. ISBN 978-1628101454.
- Kraus, Jody S.; Walt, Steven D., eds. (2007). The Jurisprudential Foundations of Corporate and Commercial Law (Cambridge Studies in Philosophy and Law). Cambridge, England: Cambridge University Press. ISBN 978-0521591577.
- Warren, William D.; Walt, Steven D. (2010). Commercial Law (University Casebook Series) (8th ed.). Sweet & Maxwell. ISBN 978-1599417851.
- Warren, William D.; Walt, Steven D. (2010). Payments and Credits (University Casebook Series) (8th ed.). West Academic Publishing. ISBN 978-1599417462.
- Warren, William D.; Walt, Steven D. (2010). Secured Transactions in Personal Property (University Casebook Series) (8th ed.). Foundation Press. ISBN 978-1599417578.
- Warren, William D.; Walt, Steven D. (2004). Commercial Law (University Casebook Series) (6th ed.). Foundation Press. ISBN 1587787393.

=== Journal articles ===
- Gillette, Clayton P.; Walt, Steven (2008). "Uniformity and Diversity in Payment Systems". Chicago-Kent Law Review. 83: 499.
- Goldsmith, Jack; Walt, Steven (May 1998). "Erie and the Irrelevance of Legal Positivism". Virginia Law Review. 84 (4): 673–713. doi:10.2307/1073753. JSTOR 1073753.
- Hynes, Richard M.; Walt, Steven (Summer 2010). "Why Banks Are Not Allowed in Bankruptcy". Washington & Lee Law Review. 67: 985.
- Kraus, Jody S.; Walt, Steven (June 1999). "In Defense of the Incorporation Strategy". University of Virginia Law School, Legal Studies Working Paper. 99–4. SSRN 170011.
- Walt, Steven (1991). "Expectations, Loss Distribution and Commercial Impracticability". Indiana Law Review. 24: 65.
- Walt, Steven (November 1991). "Book Review: Some Problems of Pragmatic Jurisprudence". Texas Law Review. 70: 317.
- Walt, Steven (1991). "For Specific Performance under the United Nations Sales Convention". Texas International Law Journal. 26: 211.
- Walt, Steven (1995). "The Case for Laundered Security Interests". Tennessee Law Review. 63: 369.
- Walt, Steven (1998). "Decision by Division: The Contractarian Structure of Commercial Arbitration". Rutgers Law Review. 51: 369.
- Walt, Steven (1998). "Generosity in Bankruptcy: The New Place of Charitable Contributions in Fraudulent Conveyance Law". Loyala of Los Angeles Law Review. 32: 1029.
- Walt, Steven (1998). "Novelty and the Risks of Uniform Sales Law". Virginia Journal of International Law. 39: 671.
- Walt, Steven (2000). "Collective Inaction and Investment: The Political Economy of Delay in Bankruptcy Reform". Emory Law Journal. 49: 1211. SSRN 198913.
- Walt, Steven (2000). "Introduction: Privatization and Its Prospects". Virginia Journal of International Law. 41: 517.
- Walt, Steven (November 2006). "Eliminating Corrective Justice". Virginia Law Review. 92 (7): 1311–1323. JSTOR 4144955.
- Walt, Steven; Laufer, William S. (1990). "Why Personhood Doesn't Matter: Corporate Criminal Liability and Sanctions". American Journal of Criminal Law. 18: 263.
- Walt, Steven; Sherwin, Emily L. (1993). "Contribution Arguments in Commercial Law". Emory Law Journal. 42 (4): 897.
