= Arthur Mag =

American lawyer (1896–1981)

- Born: October 11, 1896; New Britain, Connecticut
- Died: October 23, 1981 (aged 85); Los Angeles, California
- Education: Yale Law School (LL.B.); Yale University (A.B.)
- Occupation: Lawyer

Arthur Mag (October 11, 1896 – October 23, 1981) was a Kansas City lawyer and philanthropist. He was a named partner in the law firm of Stinson Mag and Fizzell.

== Early years ==
Arthur Mag was born in New Britain, Connecticut. He served in the U.S. Navy for two years during World War I. He later attended Yale University where he received an A.B. degree in 1918. He then attended Yale Law School where he was a member of the law review. He received his LL.B. in 1920.

== Career ==
After graduating from law school, Mag moved to Kansas City to join the law firm of Rozzelle, Vineyard, Thacher and Boys. Within three years, Thacher had retired, Rozzelle and Vineyard both died and Boys suffered a nervous breakdown which left him unable to manage the firm. In 1923, at just 26 years old, Mag took over the firm and managed to retain all of its clients despite the loss of all of the firm's senior attorneys. In order to handle the substantial workload, Mag recruited Paul Stinson, a rising young trial lawyer, to join the firm as a partner. Bob Ryland joined the firm in 1924. He was followed in 1927 by Roy Thomson. At that time, the firm became known as Ryland, Stinson, Mag and Thomson. Soon thereafter, Arthur Mag was designated the firm's first managing partner. Mag was the principal architect of the firm and guided it until his death in 1981, at which time the firm was named Stinson Mag and Fizzell. In 2002, Stinson Mag and Fizzell merged with Morrison Hecker to form Stinson Morrison Hecker.

Arthur Mag was a preeminent corporate attorney whose clients spanned the United States. Many of Mag's corporate clients also turned to him for legal advice in their personal matters. As a result, he became well known for his work in the area of trusts and estates as well. Mag pioneered the theory that trustees should be given broad, general powers to direct the efforts and funds entrusted to them. Along with Stinson, he successfully defended this approach in Irwin et al. v. Swinney et al.. which was decided in 1931.

== Notable client ==
Arthur Mag was President Harry Truman's legal counsel from 1945 to 1967. He prepared a variety of legal documents for Truman, including his will. A collection of Arthur Mag's papers and correspondence with Truman are housed at the Harry S. Truman Presidential Library and Museum in Independence, Missouri.

Mag was a founding trustee of the University of Missouri at Kansas City.

== Civic leadership ==
Through his work involving trusts and estates and his dedication to the community, Arthur Mag became an important civic leader in Kansas City. He shared the title of Kansas Citian of the year in 1964. He was instrumental in the creation of the Kansas City Association of Trusts and Foundations. He was a founding trustee of the University of Kansas City, Menorah Medical Center, Midwest Research Institute, the Starlight Theatre Association, the Greater Kansas City Mental Health Foundation, and many other hospitals, charities and schools of higher education. At the time of his death in 1981, he was a director at no fewer than 14 companies.
