= GreenOrder =

- Company type: Private
- Industry: Consulting firm
- Founded: 2000
- Founder: Andrew L. Shapiro
- Defunct: 2012
- Fate: Merged with Cleantech Group

GreenOrder was a management consulting group specialising in environmental sustainability. It was established in 2000 by Andrew L. Shapiro.

== History ==
Shapiro got the idea for GreenOrder from the Wetlands Preserve, an environmentally friendly nightclub in the TriBeCa area of New York City. GreenOrder was acquired by LRN in 2008 and operated as a wholly owned subsidiary.

GreenOrder worked with companies like Polo Ralph Lauren and General Motors. It worked with Saudi Basic Industries (SABIC) in making investments in green technologies and products. In 2011, GreenOrder Partner Truman Semans took part in delivering the keynote addresses at the World Future Energy Summit in Abu Dhabi. GreenOrder served as a principal strategic adviser on General Electric's ecomagination portfolio, including involvement in the ecomagination Product Review process.

In 2012, GreenOrder was merged with Cleantech Group LLC. GreenOrder no longer exists as a separate entity.
