= David Blankfein-Tabachnick =

American legal scholar and law professor

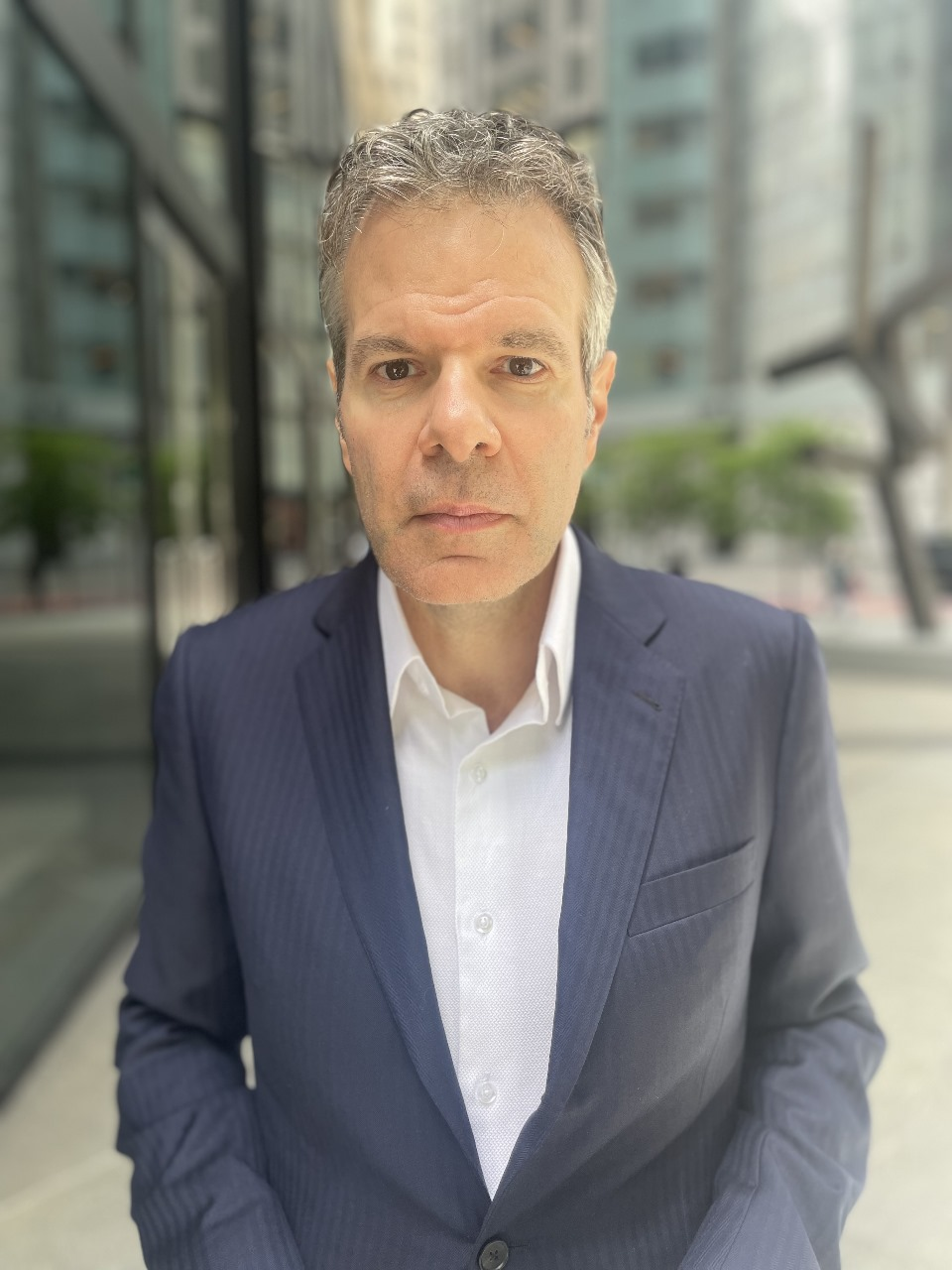
- Education: Yale Law School, University of Virginia
- Occupations: Law professor, legal scholar, associate dean
- Known for: Private law, taxation and tax policy, intellectual property, legal and political theory, law and economics

David Blankfein-Tabachnick (born August 6, 1971) is an American legal scholar and law professor. He is Professor of Law and Associate Dean for Faculty Affairs and Intellectual Life at Michigan State University College of Law.

== Academic career ==
David Blankfein-Tabachnick joined the Michigan State University College of Law faculty in 2014. In 2015-16, he was a Visiting Associate Professor at Washington University in St. Louis School of Law, teaching Criminal Law, Copyright, and Property. He has also been a visiting scholar at the Yale Law School. In 2017, David Blankfein-Tabachnick was appointed Faculty Advisor to the Michigan State Law Review. He was appointed Associate Dean for Research in 2023 and later that year promoted to Associate Dean for Faculty Affairs and Intellectual Life. Blankfein-Tabachnick served as Visiting Professor of Law at the University of Michigan in the spring of 2023, teaching Contracts and Intellectual Property.

== Research and scholarship ==
Blankfein-Tabachnick’s research focuses on private law, taxation, and intellectual property. His work examines the structure and normative dimensions of bankruptcy, contract, property, tort, and tax law. He and Kevin Kordana have collaborated on an interpretation of John Rawls's theory of justice as it applies to private law. His work on intellectual property appeared in the California Law Review, accompanied by a response from Robert P. Merges. Samuel Freeman has also responded to his collaborative work in the Virginia Law Review.

== Teaching awards ==
While at the University of Virginia, he received a university-wide award for excellence in teaching. In 2021, he received the Michigan State University All-University Teacher-Scholar Award.

== Selected publications ==
- Blankfein-Tabachnick, David; Kordana, Kevin A. (November 30, 2022). "On Rawlsian Contractualism and the Private Law". Virginia Law Review. 108 (7).
- Blankfein-Tabachnick, David (February 3, 2021). "Maximizing Intellectual Property: Optimality, Synchronicity, and Distributive Justice". St. John's Law Review. 94 (1).
- Blankfein-Tabachnick, David; Kordana, Kevin A. (December 22, 2017). "Kaplow and Shavell and the Priority of Income Taxation and Transfer". Hastings Law Journal. 69 (1).
- Blankfein-Tabachnick, David (2016). "Property, Duress, and Consensual Relationships". Michigan Law Review. 114 (6): 1013. doi:10.36644/mlr.114.6.property.
- Blankfein-Tabachnick, David H. (2013). "Intellectual Property Doctrine and Midlevel Principles". California Law Review. 101 (5). JSTOR 23784348.
- Blankfein-Tabachnick, David; Kordana, Kevin A. "On Belling the Cat: Rawls and Tort as Corrective Justice" (PDF). Virginia Law Review. 92 (7).
- Blankfein-Tabachnick, David (January 1, 2013). "Does Intellectual Property Law Have Foundations? A Review of Robert Merges's Justifying Intellectual Property". Connecticut Law Review. 45 (3).
- Kordana, Kevin A.; Blankfein Tabachnick, David H. (July 2, 2008). "The Rawlsian View of Private Ordering". Social Philosophy and Policy. 25 (2). Cambridge University Press. doi:10.1017/S0265052508080278.
- Kordana, Kevin A.; Tabachnick, David H. (July 2006). "Taxation, the Private Law, and Distributive Justice". Social Philosophy and Policy. 23 (2). Cambridge University Press. doi:10.1017/S0265052506060201.
