= Andrew L. Shapiro =

Andrew L. Shapiro has been an influential voice on environmental innovation in business for a decade. He has built a career, and a pioneering advisory group, GreenOrder, around the idea that sustainability can be a critical driver of profitable growth.

Through his speaking engagement, authorship and professional practice, Andrew has helped business leaders of some of the world's largest companies building an integrated culture of environmental innovation that creates long-term business value. His vision shaped the discourse around sustainable practices in the corporate world long before the phrase "going green" was commonly used in such environments. The management consulting group GreenOrder, founded in 2000, is recognized for its groundbreaking work with GE, DuPont, General Motors, JPMorgan Chase, Pfizer and Polo Ralph Lauren, among others.

Since 2004, Andrew and the GreenOrder have guided the creation and development of GE's award-winning, multi-billion dollar ecomagination initiative. GreenOrder continues to work with Jeff Immelt and his senior team, as well as multiple GE business units on implementation, training and the identification of new product and market opportunities.

Andrew's interdisciplinary approach encourages senior executives to use environmental sustainability as a lens to transform how they see their business. He is a frequent presenter, panelist and advisor, and his views have been quoted extensively in print and broadcast media, including The New York Times, Vanity Fair, CNN and MSNBC. Tom Friedman, notable journalist and Pulitzer Prize recipient, has included Andrew's thoughts and quotes in his best-selling book, Hot, Flat and Crowded. Recent presentations include TED, the Forbes CEO Forum, World Environmental Center, Fortune Brainstorm Green, the Aspen Ideas Festival and the Wall Street Journal Eco:nomics conference.

Andrew has been profiled in a New York Times business section feature, "A Dollars-and-Cents Man with a Green Philosophy," and he was named one of two dozen "Enviro All-Stars" by Outside magazine. He is the only strategist on Inc. magazine's list of "50 entrepreneurs who are changing the way we live today." He is a member of the Urban Land Institute Trustees' Advisory Committee on Energy and Climate Change; the advisory committee of the Center for Business and the Environment at Yale; and the board of the Southern Center for Human Rights. Andrew is also co-founder and chairman of GO Ventures, which creates and invests in cleantech and green businesses including California Bioenergy, Class Green Capital and GreenYour.com. He serves on the advisory boards of a number of companies, including LivingHomes, Meetup.com, and Serious Materials.

Andrew Shapiro is a Brown University and Yale Law School graduate. While at Yale, he was co-editor-in-chief of The Yale Journal of Law & the Humanities. He later was a contributing editor for The Nation magazine. He has served as director of the Aspen Institute Internet Policy Project. In 1992 Andrew authored We're Number One!: Where America Stands-and Falls-in the New World Order. In 1999 Andrew authored The Control Revolution: How the Internet is Putting Individuals in Charge and Changing the World We Know, which discusses the consequences of the uninhibited personalization afforded by the Internet. In 2000 Andrew founded GreenOrder, "the go-to consulting company for green business."
