= Michael Meltsner =

American lawyer and legal scholar

Michael Meltsner (born 1937) is an American lawyer, the George J. and Kathleen Waters Matthews distinguished University Professor of law (and former dean) at Northeastern University School of Law and author. Meltsner was educated at Oberlin College and the Yale Law School.

As first assistant counsel to the NAACP Legal Defense and Educational Fund he served as counsel in many leading civil rights cases of the 1960s, including those that led to the integration of Southern hospitals and medical facilities, and a moratorium on capital punishment. With special permission from the justices, he argued and won a capital case before the United States Supreme Court at the age of 26. He served as counsel in the 1968 Virginia case that led to the end of the “all deliberate speed” doctrine and brought the first winning case under employment discrimination provisions of title vii of the 1964 civil rights act. He represented Mohammad Ali in the litigation that enabled his return to the boxing ring.

In 1977, he joined with Felicia Kentridge and Arthur Chaskalson to help found South Africa’s Legal Resource Center, modeling it after the NAACP Legal Defense Fund. In 1987 he became a Massachusetts licensed marriage and family therapist but continued to teach and practice law. From 2000 to 2005, he was hired to direct d the first year law program at the Harvard Law School.

He married Heli Spiegel in 1961. They have two children, Jessica Meltsner of Blacksburg Virginia and Molly Meltsner of Seattle Washington and four grandchildren.

Board memberships include the Legal Action Center and Mass Humanities. Meltsner sits on the board of the Legal Action Center. He is a winner of many awards including a Berlin American Academy prize Fellowship, a Guggenheim Fellowship, the Hugo Bedau Award for capital punishment scholarship and an American Bar Association Silver Gabel media award. In 2012 John Jay College (CUNY) conferred an Honorary Doctor of Laws calling him "the principal architect of the death penalty abolition movement in the United States."

== Selected publications ==
- Philip G Schrag and Michael Meltsner, Reflections on Clinical Education, Northeastern University Press, 1998, ISBN 1-55553-339-6
- Cruel and Unusual: The Supreme Court and Capital Punishment, (Quid Pro Books Section Edition, 2011) ISBN 978-1-61027-098-4
- The Making of a Civil Rights Lawyer, University of Virginia Press, 2006, ISBN 0-8139-2501-0
- In Our Name: A Play of the Torture Years, Norwood Press, 2010
- Short Takes, A Novel, Random House, 1979
- Race Rape and Injustice, University of Tennessee Press, 2012
