= Barack Obama judicial appointment controversies =

Overview of the judicial appointment controversies of Barack Obama

U.S. President Barack Obama nominated over 400 individuals for federal judgeships during his presidency. Of these nominations, Congress confirmed 329 judgeships, 173 during the 111th & 112th Congresses and 156 during the 113th and 114th Congresses.

Republicans successfully blocked some confirmations, either by filibuster or voting against cloture, even while the Democratic caucus held a Senate majority (2009–2015). Senator Chuck Grassley, then-ranking Republican on the judiciary, said that more nominees could have been considered if not for the January 2012 National Labor Relations Board recess appointments; the Supreme Court later unanimously ruled these January 2012 appointments illegal in NLRB v. Noel Canning.

In response, Senate Majority Leader Harry Reid invoked the so-called parliamentary nuclear option on November 21, 2013, which changed the Senate's confirmation threshold for all executive nominees except for the Supreme Court. While Senate confirmations of Obama judicial nominees rose in 2014 following the "nuclear option," the greatest number of rejection of Obama nominees occurred following the 2014 United States Senate elections, where the Republicans gained nine seats and majority control of the chamber. Obama ultimately nominated 70 individuals for 104 different federal judgeships during this Congress, with 20 confirmations.

With the death of Antonin Scalia in February 2016 in the beginning of a presidential election year, the Republican majority in the Senate made it their stated policy to refuse to consider any nominee to the Supreme Court, arguing that the next president should be the one to appoint Scalia's replacement. Obama nominated Merrick Garland for the open Supreme Court seat, but the Senate did not consider the nomination.

== List of unsuccessful federal judicial nominations ==
Obama made 80 nominations for federal judgeships that were not confirmed by the Senate. Of these, 7 were withdrawn by Obama, while the other 73 expired at an adjournment of the Senate, including 54 that were pending at the close of the 114th Congress. As of December 4, 2023, 23 of his unsuccessful nominees had been nominated to federal judgeships by subsequent presidents, with 22 of them having been confirmed.

Nominee	Court	Nomination date	Date of final action	Final action	Subsequent federal judicial nominations	Seat filled by	Ref.
Supreme Court
Merrick Garland	SCOTUS	March 16, 2016	January 3, 2017	returned to the president		Neil Gorsuch	
Courts of appeals
Robert N. Chatigny	2nd Cir.	February 24, 2010	September 13, 2010	returned to the president		Christopher F. Droney	
Goodwin Liu	9th Cir.	February 24, 2010	July 29, 2011	withdrawn by Pres. Obama		Jacqueline Nguyen	
Edward C. DuMont	Fed. Cir.	April 14, 2010	January 5, 2011	withdrawn by Pres. Obama		Richard G. Taranto	
Victoria F. Nourse	7th Cir.	July 14, 2010	January 5, 2011	returned to the president		Michael B. Brennan	
Caitlin Halligan	D.C. Cir.	September 29, 2010	March 22, 2013	withdrawn by Pres. Obama		Patricia Millett	
Stephen Six	10th Cir.	March 9, 2011	January 3, 2012	returned to the president		Nancy Moritz	
Donald Karl Schott	7th Cir.	January 12, 2016	January 3, 2017	returned to the president		Michael B. Brennan	
Myra C. Selby	7th Cir.	January 12, 2016	January 3, 2017	returned to the president		Amy Coney Barrett	
Jennifer Klemetsrud Puhl	8th Cir.	January 28, 2016	January 3, 2017	returned to the president		Ralph R. Erickson	
Abdul Kallon	11th Cir.	February 11, 2016	January 3, 2017	returned to the president		Kevin Newsom	
Lucy Koh	9th Cir.	February 25, 2016	January 3, 2017	returned to the president	9th Cir. (nominated September 20, 2021, confirmed December 13, 2021)	Daniel P. Collins	
Rebecca Ross Haywood	3rd Cir.	March 15, 2016	January 3, 2017	returned to the president		Stephanos Bibas	
Lisabeth Tabor Hughes	6th Cir.	March 17, 2016	January 3, 2017	returned to the president		Amul Thapar	
District courts
Louis B. Butler	W.D. Wis.	September 30, 2009	January 3, 2012	returned to the president		James D. Peterson	
Charles Bernard Day	D. Md.	July 21, 2010	January 5, 2011	withdrawn by Pres. Obama		George L. Russell III	
Michael Green	W.D.N.Y.	January 26, 2011	January 3, 2012	returned to the president		Frank P. Geraci Jr.	
Natasha Perdew Silas	N.D. Ga.	January 26, 2011	January 3, 2012	returned to the president		Mark Howard Cohen	
Linda T. Walker	N.D. Ga.	January 26, 2011	January 3, 2012	returned to the president		Leigh Martin May	
Arvo Mikkanen	N.D. Okla.	February 2, 2011	January 3, 2012	returned to the president		John E. Dowdell	
Elissa F. Cadish	D. Nev.	February 16, 2012	January 4, 2013	withdrawn by Pres. Obama		Richard Boulware II	
William L. Thomas	S.D. Fla.	November 14, 2012	January 4, 2013	returned to the president		Robin L. Rosenberg	
Jennifer Prescod May-Parker	E.D.N.C.	June 20, 2013	January 6, 2014	returned to the president		Richard E. Myers II	
Alison Renee Lee	D.S.C.	June 26, 2013	January 6, 2014	withdrawn by Pres. Obama		A. Marvin Quattlebaum Jr.	
Michael P. Boggs	N.D. Ga.	December 19, 2013	January 6, 2014	returned to the president		Michael Lawrence Brown	
Mary Barzee Flores	S.D. Fla.	February 26, 2015	January 3, 2017	returned to the president		Rodney Smith	
Julien Neals	D.N.J.	February 26, 2015	January 3, 2017	returned to the president	D.N.J. (nominated April 19, 2021, confirmed June 8, 2021)	Evelyn Padin	
Edward L. Stanton III	W.D. Tenn.	May 21, 2015	January 3, 2017	returned to the president		Tommy Parker	
Mark A. Young	C.D. Cal.	July 16, 2015	January 3, 2017	returned to the president		Stanley Blumenfeld	
Susan Paradise Baxter	W.D. Pa.	July 30, 2015	January 3, 2017	returned to the president	W.D. Pa. (nominated December 20, 2017, confirmed August 28, 2018)	Herself	
Inga S. Bernstein	D. Mass.	July 30, 2015	January 3, 2017	returned to the president		Angel Kelley	
Gary R. Brown	E.D.N.Y.	July 30, 2015	January 3, 2017	returned to the president	E.D.N.Y. (nominated May 15, 2018, confirmed December 19, 2019)	Himself	
Robert J. Colville	W.D. Pa.	July 30, 2015	January 3, 2017	returned to the president	W.D. Pa. (nominated March 5, 2019, confirmed December 19, 2019)	Marilyn Horan	
Marilyn Horan	W.D. Pa.	July 30, 2015	January 3, 2017	returned to the president	W.D. Pa. (nominated December 20, 2017, confirmed September 6, 2018)	Peter J. Phipps	
Dax Eric López	N.D. Ga.	July 30, 2015	January 3, 2017	returned to the president		Michael Lawrence Brown	
John Milton Younge	E.D. Pa.	July 30, 2015	January 3, 2017	returned to the president	E.D. Pa. (nominated July 17, 2018, confirmed July 31, 2019)	Himself	
Clare E. Connors	D. Haw.	September 8, 2015	January 3, 2017	returned to the president		Jill Otake	
Stephanie A. Gallagher	D. Md.	September 8, 2015	January 3, 2017	returned to the president	D. Md. (nominated June 11, 2018, confirmed September 11, 2019)	Herself	
Mary S. McElroy	D.R.I.	September 8, 2015	January 3, 2017	returned to the president	D.R.I. (nominated April 12, 2018, confirmed September 11, 2019)	Herself	
Paul Lewis Abrams	C.D. Cal.	December 16, 2015	January 3, 2017	returned to the president		John W. Holcomb	
Suzanne Mitchell	W.D. Okla.	December 16, 2015	January 3, 2017	returned to the president		Patrick Wyrick	
Scott L. Palk	W.D. Okla.	December 16, 2015	January 3, 2017	returned to the president	W.D. Okla. (nominated May 8, 2017, confirmed October 26, 2017)	Himself	
Ronald G. Russell	D. Utah	December 16, 2015	January 3, 2017	returned to the president		Howard C. Nielson Jr.	
Winfield D. Ong	S.D. Ind.	January 12, 2016	January 3, 2017	returned to the president		James R. Sweeney II	
Terrence J. Campbell	D. Kan.	January 28, 2016	January 3, 2017	returned to the president		Holly Teeter	
Stephanie A. Finley	W.D. La.	February 4, 2016	January 3, 2017	returned to the president		Michael J. Juneau	
Claude J. Kelly III	E.D. La.	February 4, 2016	January 3, 2017	returned to the president		Barry Ashe	
Donald W. Beatty	D.S.C.	February 25, 2016	January 3, 2017	returned to the president		A. Marvin Quattlebaum Jr.	
Donald C. Coggins Jr.	D.S.C.	February 25, 2016	January 3, 2017	returned to the president	D.S.C. (nominated August 3, 2017, confirmed November 16, 2017)	Himself	
David Counts	W.D. Tex.	March 15, 2016	January 3, 2017	returned to the president	W.D. Tex. (nominated September 11, 2017, confirmed January 11, 2018)	Himself	
E. Scott Frost	N.D. Tex.	March 15, 2016	January 3, 2017	returned to the president		James Wesley Hendrix	
James Wesley Hendrix	N.D. Tex.	March 15, 2016	January 3, 2017	returned to the president	N.D. Tex. (nominated January 17, 2019, confirmed July 30, 2019)	Karen Gren Scholer	
Irma Carrillo Ramirez	N.D. Tex.	March 15, 2016	January 3, 2017	returned to the president	5th Cir. (nominated April 17, 2023, confirmed December 4, 2023)	Ada Brown	
Karen Gren Scholer	E.D. Tex.	March 15, 2016	January 3, 2017	returned to the president	N.D. Tex. (nominated September 7, 2017, confirmed March 5, 2018)	Sean D. Jordan	
Kathleen Marie Sweet	W.D.N.Y.	March 15, 2016	January 3, 2017	returned to the president		John Sinatra	
David Nye	D. Idaho	April 5, 2016	January 3, 2017	returned to the president	D. Idaho (nominated May 8, 2017, confirmed July 12, 2017)	Himself	
Beth M. Andrus	W.D. Wash.	April 14, 2016	January 3, 2017	returned to the president		Lauren J. King	
J. Michael Diaz	W.D. Wash.	April 14, 2016	January 3, 2017	returned to the president		John H. Chun	
Kathleen M. O'Sullivan	W.D. Wash.	April 14, 2016	January 3, 2017	returned to the president	President Trump announced intention to re-nominate but never did so	Tana Lin	
Patricia D. Barksdale	M.D. Fla.	April 28, 2016	January 3, 2017	returned to the president		Wendy Berger	
Todd E. Edelman	D.D.C.	April 28, 2016	January 3, 2017	returned to the president	D.D.C. (nominated September 27, 2022, returned January 3, 2024)	Carl J. Nichols	
William F. Jung	M.D. Fla.	April 28, 2016	January 3, 2017	returned to the president	M.D. Fla. (nominated December 21, 2017, confirmed September 6, 2018)	Himself	
Philip R. Lammens	N.D. Fla.	April 28, 2016	January 3, 2017	returned to the president		T. Kent Wetherell II	
Florence Y. Pan	D.D.C.	April 28, 2016	January 3, 2017	returned to the president	D.D.C. (nominated June 15, 2021, confirmed September 23, 2021); D.C. Cir. (nominated May 25, 2022, confirmed September 20, 2022)	Dabney L. Friedrich	
Regina M. Rodriguez	D. Colo.	April 28, 2016	January 3, 2017	returned to the president	D. Colo. (nominated April 19, 2021, confirmed June 8, 2021)	Daniel D. Domenico	
Patricia Timmons-Goodson	E.D.N.C.	April 28, 2016	January 3, 2017	returned to the president		Richard E. Myers II	
Anne Traum	D. Nev.	April 28, 2016	January 3, 2017	returned to the president	D. Nev. (nominated November 3, 2021, confirmed March 23, 2022)	Herself	
Abid Riaz Qureshi	D.D.C.	September 6, 2016	January 3, 2017	returned to the president		Timothy J. Kelly	
Diane Gujarati	E.D.N.Y.	September 13, 2016	January 3, 2017	returned to the president	E.D.N.Y. (nominated May 15, 2018, confirmed September 10, 2020)	Herself	
Court of International Trade
Jeanne E. Davidson	Intl. Trade	September 8, 2014	January 7, 2015	returned to the president		M. Miller Baker	
Elizabeth J. Drake	Intl. Trade	July 30, 2015	January 3, 2017	returned to the president		Timothy M. Reif	
Article I courts
Gloria Wilson Shelton	Vet. Cl.	June 22, 2011	January 24, 2012	withdrawn by Pres. Obama		Margaret Bartley	
Nancy B. Firestone	Fed. Cl.	April 10, 2014	January 7, 2015	returned to the president		Ryan T. Holte	
Thomas L. Halkowski	Fed. Cl.	April 10, 2014	January 7, 2015	returned to the president		David A. Tapp	
Armando Bonilla	Fed. Cl.	May 21, 2014	January 7, 2015	returned to the president	Fed. Cl. (nominated July 13, 2021, confirmed December 18, 2021)	Himself	
Patricia M. McCarthy	Fed. Cl.	May 21, 2014	January 7, 2015	returned to the president		Matthew H. Solomson	
Jeri Somers	Fed. Cl.	May 21, 2014	January 7, 2015	returned to the president		Richard Hertling	
Elizabeth A. Copeland	T.C.	May 4, 2015	January 3, 2017	returned to the president	T.C. (nominated August 3, 2017, confirmed August 28, 2018)	Patrick J. Urda	
Vik Edwin Stoll	T.C.	November 9, 2015	January 3, 2017	returned to the president		Elizabeth A. Copeland	
Article IV courts
Frances Tydingco-Gatewood	D. Guam	May 18, 2016	January 3, 2017	returned to the president		TBD	

== Nomination of Merrick Garland to the Supreme Court ==
Following the death of Associate Justice of the Supreme Court Antonin Scalia in February 2016, President Obama nominated Merrick Garland to fill Scalia's seat on the Supreme Court. At the time of his nomination, Garland was the Chief Judge of the United States Court of Appeals for the District of Columbia Circuit. Scalia's death led to an unusual situation in which a Democratic president had the opportunity to appoint a Supreme Court nominee while the Republicans controlled the United States Senate; before Scalia's death; such a situation last occurred when a Senate Republican majority confirmed Grover Cleveland's nomination of Rufus Wheeler Peckham in 1895. While Garland himself was not personally controversial, Scalia was considered one of the more conservative members of the Supreme Court. Political and legal commentators noted that a more liberal replacement could shift the Court's ideological balance for many years into the future, as the confirmation of Garland would have given Democratic appointees a majority on the Supreme Court for the first time since the Harry Blackmun's confirmation in 1970.

Following Scalia's death, Republican Senate leaders announced that they did not plan to consider any Supreme Court nomination during the president's last year in office, citing the upcoming 2016 United States presidential election. Senate Democrats argued that there was sufficient time to vote on a nominee before the election. Garland's nomination ultimately expired on January 3, 2017, with the end of the 114th Congress. The nomination remained before the Senate for 293 days, the longest such nomination in American history Supreme Court nomination.

On January 31, 2017, President Donald Trump announced his selection of Judge Neil Gorsuch for the open Supreme Court seat. Gorsuch was confirmed on April 7, 2017, by a Republican-majority Senate, 54–45 and sworn in on April 10, 2017.

== Failed, stalled or filibustered appellate nominations ==
=== Failed nominations ===
- United States Court of Appeals for the Second Circuit
  - Robert Chatigny (of Connecticut), to seat vacated by Guido Calabresi: during the 111th Congress, Connecticut Senator Chris Dodd recommended Chatigny for a judgeship on the Second Circuit, and he was nominated by President Obama on February 24, 2010. Critics of Chatigny's nomination highlighted his controversial performance during the trial of serial killer Michael Bruce Ross, for whom Chatigny granted a temporary stay of execution. In addition, opponents cited a 2001 ruling declaring that a sex offender registration system violated a convict's civil rights and right to privacy, a ruling that drew bipartisan condemnation. His nomination was returned by the Senate on August 5, 2010, and Dodd, his main sponsor, did not seek reelection to the U.S. Senate that year. Chatigny removed his name from consideration and was not renominated. Obama ultimately chose U.S. District Judge Christopher F. Droney to fill the seat, and the Senate confirmed Droney without opposition on November 28, 2011.
- United States Court of Appeals for the Ninth Circuit
  - Goodwin Liu (of California), to newly created seat: Liu was nominated on February 24, 2010. His nomination was returned by the Senate on August 5, 2010. Liu had faced opposition from Republicans who described him as an "extreme liberal" because of his outspoken support of same-sex marriage and affirmative action, and his 2008 article advocating for Constitutional protection of welfare benefits. He was also denounced for his personal criticism of the Supreme Court nominations of John Roberts and Samuel Alito, and his consideration as a possible Supreme Court candidate. Liu was renominated at the start of the 112th Congress. On May 17, 2011, Senate Majority Leader Harry Reid filed for cloture on Liu's nomination, with 60 votes needed to proceed to a floor vote on Liu's nomination; the cloture motion attracted only 52 of the 60 aye votes required. On May 25, 2011, Liu wrote to Obama requesting that his nomination be withdrawn due to the improbability that he would receive a floor vote. On July 26, 2011, Governor Jerry Brown nominated Liu to a seat on the Supreme Court of California, and he was sworn in on September 1, 2011. Obama nominated U.S. District Judge Jacqueline Nguyen to the Ninth Circuit seat to which Liu had been nominated, and the Senate confirmed her without opposition on May 7, 2012.
- United States Court of Appeals for the Federal Circuit
  - Edward C. DuMont: DuMont was nominated to the Federal Circuit on April 14, 2010. If confirmed, DuMont would have been the first openly gay United States appeals court judge. The Senate Judiciary Committee did not schedule a hearing on the nomination despite holding hearings and votes for two later nominees to the same court. A spokesperson for Senator Chuck Grassley, the ranking Republican on the committee, said in August 2011 only that "There are questions in Mr. DuMont's background investigation that have to be resolved." In November 2011, the National Law Journal reported that DuMont had submitted a letter to President Obama, asking that the president withdraw his nomination because one or more senators of the minority party on the Committee refused to allow the committee to give him a hearing; Obama withdrew DuMont's nomination later that day. In November 2011, Obama nominated Richard G. Taranto to the seat to which DuMont had been nominated, and the Senate confirmed him without opposition on March 11, 2013.
- United States Court of Appeals for the Seventh Circuit
  - Victoria F. Nourse (of Wisconsin), to a seat vacated by Terence T. Evans: Nourse, a former counsel for the U.S. Senate Judiciary Committee, was recommended by Senator Russ Feingold After defeating Senator Feingold in the 2010 midterm elections, newly elected Senator Ron Johnson blocked Nourse's nomination. Nourse was not renominated. Obama nominated Donald Karl Schott, who was approved by the Judiciary Committee but did not receive a vote on the floor. The seat was ultimately filled in 2018 by President Trump nominee Michael B. Brennan.
  - Myra C. Selby (of Indiana), to a seat vacated by John Daniel Tinder: Selby, the first black American and the first woman appointed to the Indiana Supreme Court, was nominated by President Obama on January 12, 2016. Republican Senator Dan Coats blue slipped the nomination, and the nomination stalled out in the Judiciary Committee. The seat was ultimately filled in 2017 by Trump nominee Amy Coney Barrett, who would later join the Supreme Court following the death of Ruth Bader Ginsburg.
- United States Court of Appeals for the Tenth Circuit
  - Stephen Six (of Kansas), to seat vacated by Deanell Reece Tacha. Former Kansas Attorney General Six was opposed by both home state senators. Republicans claimed that he was a liberal extremist who would substitute his personal opinions for the law and the Constitution. Six's critics strongly condemned his conduct in a 2008 investigation of physician George Tiller, who was charged with performing illegal late-term abortions. Six was accused of improperly quashing a subpoena for Tiller's patient records. Based on this criticism, the Senate Judiciary Committee did not act upon the nomination, and it was returned to the president on December 17, 2011, pursuant to the rules of the Senate. President Obama later chose Kansas Supreme Court Justice Nancy Moritz to fill the seat to which Six had been nominated, and the Senate easily confirmed Moritz on May 5, 2014.
- United States Court of Appeals for the District of Columbia Circuit
  - Caitlin Halligan (of New York), to seat vacated by John Roberts: on September 29, 2010, President Obama nominated New York Solicitor Halligan. Her argument that "gun manufacturers, wholesalers, and retailers contributed to a 'public nuisance' of illegal handguns in the state [of New York]," prompted critics to claim that she was a liberal ideologue who would not uphold the Second Amendment and would base rulings on personal opinion rather than the law. Halligan's nomination failed to reach the threshold for cloture. Obama renominated Halligan to the D.C. Circuit in June 2012, The nomination was again returned to the President on August 3, 2012, and Obama renominated Halligan to the seat for a third time on September 19, 2012. On March 22, 2013, the President officially withdrew Halligan's nomination. On June 4, 2013, Obama nominated Patricia Millett to fill the vacancy, and the Senate confirmed her on December 10, 2013.

=== Successful appointments ===
- United States Court of Appeals for the Seventh Circuit
  - David Hamilton (of Indiana), to seat vacated by Kenneth Francis Ripple: Hamilton was nominated on March 17, 2009. Prior to President Obama's successful appointment of Hamilton, President George W. Bush had unsuccessfully nominated Philip P. Simon to succeed Judge Ripple, who assumed senior status in September 2008. Hamilton's nomination generated opposition from groups who objected to some of his rulings while serving as a judge on the U.S. District Court for the Southern District of Indiana, particularly those dealing with abortion and prayer. However, Hamilton received the support of both Senators from Indiana, including Republican Senator Richard Lugar. On November 17, 2009, the United States Senate invoked cloture on his nomination by a 70–29 vote. Hamilton was confirmed on November 19, 2009, by a 59–39 vote. Lugar was the only Republican to vote for the confirmation of Hamilton.
- United States Court of Appeals for the Third Circuit
  - Patty Shwartz (of New Jersey), to seat vacated by Maryanne Trump Barry: New Jersey Democratic Senator Bob Menendez did not return his blue slip, which effectively blocked the nomination. In January 2012, The New York Times reported that Senator Menendez did not provide a reason for the blue slip, noting that Shwartz long had been in a relationship with the head of the New Jersey federal prosecutor's public corruption unit which investigated Menendez during the 2006 United States Senate election in New Jersey, an investigation that Menendez contended was politically motivated. On January 13, 2012, Menendez dropped his opposition to Shwartz's nomination, and the Judiciary Committee reported her nomination to the floor of the Senate by a 10–6 vote. On January 2, 2013, her nomination was returned to the President due to the sine die adjournment of the Senate. On January 3, 2013, she was renominated. Her nomination was reported to the floor by the Senate Judiciary Committee on February 14, 2013, by a 11–7 vote, and the Senate confirmed her nomination on April 9, 2013, by a 64–34 vote.
- United States Court of Appeals for the Ninth Circuit
  - Andrew D. Hurwitz (of Arizona), to seat vacated by Mary M. Schroeder: In a 2002 law review article, Hurwitz wrote that he had helped create, and still admires, the legal framework for Judge Jon O. Newman's opinion striking down Connecticut's abortion law in 1972 prior to Roe v. Wade. While Hurwitz's home-state senators supported his nomination, other Republican senators objected to it. The Senate invoke cloture on his nomination on June 11, 2012, by a 60–31 vote. Hurwitz was confirmed on June 12, 2012, by a voice vote.
- United States Court of Appeals for the Tenth Circuit
  - Robert E. Bacharach (of Oklahoma), to seat vacated by Robert Harlan Henry. A United States magistrate judge of the United States District Court for the Western District of Oklahoma since 1999, Bacharach's nomination failed to receive enough votes to invoke cloture. While Republicans had no objection to Bachrach himself, they contended that the consideration of his nomination came too late in a presidential election year, citing the informal Thurmond Rule. After President Obama's re-election, Bacharach was confirmed on February 25, 2013, by a 93–0 vote.
- United States Court of Appeals for the Eleventh Circuit
  - Adalberto Jordan (of Florida), to seat vacated by Susan H. Black. While Republicans did not have specific objections to the nomination, Republican senators, such as Mike Lee, objected to Obama's nominations during this time period in response to recess appointments made in January 2012, to the National Labor Relations Board. On February 9, 2012, Senator Harry Reid motioned to invoke cloture on Jordan's nomination, which was invoked on February 13, 2012, by an 89–5 vote. The Senate confirmed Jordan on February 15, 2012, by a 94–5 vote.
  - Jill A. Pryor, to the United States Court of Appeals for the Eleventh Circuit. Originally nominated February 16, 2012, to seat vacated by Stanley F. Birch. Georgia's two Republican senators, Johnny Isakson and Saxby Chambliss, refused to return their blue slips, thus blocking her nomination. In September 2013, it was reported that a deal was in the works between the White House and the senators to ensure a hearing on Pryor’s nomination and to fill the other district court vacancies within Georgia, thus upsetting those in the Georgia's Democratic delegation. On June 19, 2014, her nomination was reported out of committee by voice vote. On July 30, 2014, Senator Harry Reid motioned to invoke cloture on Pryor's nomination. On July 31, 2014, the United States Senate invoked cloture on Pryor's nomination by a 58–33 vote. On September 8, 2014, her nomination was confirmed by a 97–0 vote.
- United States Court of Appeals for the District of Columbia Circuit
  - Patricia Millett, Cornelia Pillard, and Robert L. Wilkins to seats vacated by John G. Roberts Jr., Douglas H. Ginsburg, and David B. Sentelle, respectively: in November 2013, Republicans opposed the confirmation of three nominees to the D.C. Circuit Court of Appeals, citing the caseload while accusing President Obama of "court packing," evoking President Franklin D. Roosevelt's Judicial Procedures Reform Bill of 1937. This set of objections resulted in Senate Majority Leader Harry Reid invoking the so-called parliamentary nuclear option on November 21, 2013, which changed the Senate's confirmation threshold for all executive nominees except for the Supreme Court. Millet was confirmed on December 10, 2013, by a 56–38 vote. Pillard was confirmed on December 11, 2013, by a 51–44 vote. Wilkins was confirmed on January 13, 2014, by a 55–43 vote. The confirmations marked the first time the U.S. Court of Appeals for the D.C. Circuit had a full complement of judges since Clarence Thomas left the court on October 23, 1991, upon his elevation to the Supreme Court.

== Failed, stalled or filibustered district court nominations ==
=== Failed nominations ===
- United States District Court for the Western District of Wisconsin
  - Louis B. Butler: Butler unsuccessfully ran for the Wisconsin Supreme Court in 2000 and lost by a wide margin. He was appointed to the Wisconsin Supreme Court in 2004, but narrowly lost the 2008 election to retain the seat. On September 30, 2009, President Obama nominated Butler to serve on the District Court. Critics argued that Butler should not be appointed to the federal bench after having been twice rejected by the voters of his state, and labeled him as liberal ideologue who was hostile toward tough criminal sentences and the rights of gun owners. He was also criticized for a ruling which effectively overturned the state's limits on non-economic damages in medical malpractice suits and a ruling in which he supported "collective liability" in lead paint cases in which companies could be held liable for products that they didn't produce, leading to charges of being overly beholden to trial lawyers. Wisconsin Senator Ron Johnson, elected in 2010, immediately placed a hold on Butler's nomination once he took office in 2011, and the Senate returned Butler's nomination to the White House in December 2011 without consideration. On November 7, 2013, Obama nominated James D. Peterson to fill this vacancy, and he was confirmed overwhelmingly on May 8, 2014.
- United States District Court for the District of Maryland
  - Charles Bernard Day: Day, a U.S. magistrate judge in Maryland, was initially nominated in July 2010, but his nomination was withdrawn by President Obama on October 31, 2011. Day did not receive a hearing in the Judiciary Committee. Senator Chuck Grassley stated that Committee members had "insurmountable concerns" about matters raised during a background investigation of Day, adding that Day "is aware of those problems and is free to share that information if he so desires." In November 2011, Obama nominated Baltimore Circuit Court Judge George Levi Russell III to fill this vacancy, and he was confirmed on May 14, 2012.
- United States District Court for the Western District of New York
  - Michael Charles Green: Green, then the Monroe County District Attorney in western New York, was nominated on January 26, 2011. The nomination was reported out of the Senate Judiciary Committee, but the nomination stalled in the Senate and was returned to the president at the end of 2011. In follow-up questions to his hearing testimony, several Republican senators focused on Green's decision to seek drug treatment rather than jail for some offenders, while others queried Green about his views on the death penalty. On December 18, 2011, a White House spokesman told a local newspaper that President Obama would not renominate Green to the seat. "Mike Green would have made an outstanding judge, and it is very unfortunate not only for him, but for a strong judiciary, that partisan politics stood in the way," Senator Chuck Schumer said in a statement on December 18, 2011. On December 19, 2011, Green said at a press conference that he blamed local opposition on his failed judicial nomination, as a result of his prosecution of public corruption. In May 2012, Obama nominated longtime Rochester judge Frank Paul Geraci, Jr. to fill thisvacancy, and he was confirmed unanimously on December 13, 2012.
- United States District Court for the Northern District of Oklahoma
  - Arvo Mikkanen: Mikkanen was nominated following a recommendation from Democratic Governor Brad Henry. His nomination was immediately met with opposition from members of Oklahoma's congressional delegation, with Republican Senators James Inhofe and Tom Coburn and Democratic Representative Dan Boren expressing disappointment that they were not consulted on the nomination. Opposition to Mikkanen's nomination centered around procedural grounds, and President Obama ultimately nominated then-federal magistrate judge John E. Dowdell to fill the vacancy. The Senate confirmed Dowdell unanimously on December 11, 2012.
- United States District Court for the Northern District of Georgia
  - Natasha Perdew Silas: Georgia's two Republican senators, Johnny Isakson and Saxby Chambliss, opposed Silas, a staff attorney at the Federal Public Defender program for Northern Georgia, for reasons which they declined to discuss publicly. As a result, Silas did not receive a hearing before the Senate Judiciary Committee. Her nomination was returned to Obama on December 17, 2011. On December 19, 2013, Obama nominated Mark Howard Cohen to fill this vacancy. He was confirmed on November 18, 2014.
  - Linda T. Walker: Originally nominated on January 26, 2011. Her nomination expired when it was returned to the President on December 17, 2011. On December 19, 2013, Obama nominated Leigh Martin May to fill this vacancy. She was confirmed without opposition on November 13, 2014.
  - Michael P. Boggs: Originally nominated on December 19, 2013, to the seat expected to be vacated by Judge Julie E. Carnes, who was nominated to United States Court of Appeals for the Eleventh Circuit on the same day. David Scott, U.S. Representative from Georgia's 13th district, criticized the nomination of Boggs because of Boggs' votes in the legislature to retain Confederate insignia in the state flag of Georgia, restrict abortion, and ban same-sex marriage. Boggs was nominated as part of a group of nominees that won approval of Georgia's U.S. senators, to allow votes on their nominations. He received a hearing before the Senate Judiciary Committee on May 13, 2014, but his nomination was not reported from committee. On December 30, 2014, Senator Chambliss revealed that he had been advised in late November by White House chief of staff Denis McDonough that Boggs would not be renominated. On July 30, 2015, the President nominated judge Dax Eric López to the vacancy.
  - Dax Eric López: On July 30, 2015, President Obama nominated DeKalb County Circuit Court Judge López to serve as a Federal judge, to the seat vacated by Julie E. Carnes, who was elevated to the United States Court of Appeals for the Eleventh Circuit. Senator David Perdue announced that he would not return Lopez's blue slip due to the treatment by Democrats of the prior nominee, Michael P. Boggs, effectively killing Lopez's nomination. The seat was later filled by Trump nominee Michael Lawrence Brown.
- United States District Court for the District of Nevada
  - Elissa F. Cadish: On February 16, 2012, President Obama nominated Cadish, a Clark County District Court Judge, to be a judge for the United States District Court for the District of Nevada. She would have replaced Philip M. Pro who took senior status in 2011. Because Senator Heller had refused to return his blue slip, the Senate Judiciary Committee did not hold a hearing on her nomination. Heller's opposition to her nomination and his invocation of "senatorial courtesy" was because of a statement by Cadish indicating that she believed that there was no individual right to keep and bear arms, a statement which was made in 2008, prior to Supreme Court decisions explicitly recognizing an individual right to keep and bear arms. On March 8, 2013, Cadish requested that President Obama withdraw her nomination, and on March 13, 2013, Obama formally withdrew the nomination. On January 16, 2014, Obama nominated Richard F. Boulware to fill this vacancy, and he was confirmed on June 10, 2014.
- United States District Court for the Southern District of Florida
  - William L. Thomas: On November 14, 2012, President Obama nominated Dade County Circuit Court Judge Thomas to a seat on the U.S. District Court for the Southern District of Florida to replace Adalberto Jordan. If confirmed, Thomas would have been the first openly gay black male to serve as a federal judge. On January 2, 2013, his nomination was returned to the President, due to the sine die adjournment of the Senate. On January 3, 2013, he was renominated to the same office. On September 19, 2013, Senator Marco Rubio announced that – although originally he recommended Thomas to the President – he would not return his blue slip. His nomination was returned to the President because of the sine die adjournment of Congress on January 3, 2014. Obama decided not to resubmitt the nomination a third time. Palm Beach County Circuit Court Judge Robin L. Rosenberg was nominated to the seat on February 26, 2014, and she was confirmed on July 22, 2014.
- United States District Court for the District of South Carolina
  - Alison Renee Lee: A Richland County Circuit Court Judge since 1999, Lee was originally nominated on June 26, 2013, to the seat being vacated by Cameron McGowan Currie, who took senior status on October 3, 2013. South Carolina Senators Lindsey Graham and Tim Scott opposed her nomination because of a controversial decision that she made involving burglary suspect Lorenzo Young. Lee consolidated his bonds and reduced the bond total from $225,000 to $175,000 for Young, who subsequently was released and then later charged in a July 1 murder. Because of opposition from her home state senators and no opportunity of receiving a committee hearing, on September 18, 2014, Obama withdrew her nomination. The seat was filled in 2019 by Trump nominee A. Marvin Quattlebaum Jr.
- United States District Court for the Eastern District of North Carolina
  - Jennifer Prescod May-Parker: Originally nominated June 20, 2013, to the seat vacated by Malcolm Jones Howard, she did not receive a hearing. Senator Richard Burr did not return his blue slip. Her nomination was returned on December 16, 2014, because of the adjournment of the 113th Congress. President Obama chose not to renominate her. The seat was later filled by Trump nominee Richard E. Myers II.
- United States District Court for the District of Kansas
  - Terrence J. Campbell: On January 28, 2016, President Obama nominated Campbell to serve as a judge of the United States District Court for the District of Kansas, to the seat vacated by Kathryn H. Vratil, who took senior status on April 22, 2014. Campbell generated no controversy, but his nomination was not acted upon. On December 7, 2016, Campbell, in letters to Obama and Kansas Senators Pat Roberts and Jerry Moran, requested that his name be withdrawn from further consideration. His nomination expired on January 3, 2017, at the end of the 114th Congress. The seat was later filled by Trump nominee Holly Lou Teeter.
- United States District Court for the District of Utah
  - Ronald G. Russell: On December 16, 2015, President Obama nominated former Centerville Mayor Russell to serve on the United States District Court for the District of Utah, to the seat vacated by Ted Stewart, who took senior status on September 1, 2014. Russell, a Republican, had the support of Utah Senators Orrin Hatch and Mike Lee. Russell received a hearing before the Senate Judiciary Committee on April 20, 2016, and was approved without objection on May 19. However, Russell's nomination stalled on the floor, due to the blockade on confirmations imposed by Senate Majority Leader Mitch McConnell, and Democratic objections to expediting Russell's nomination without confirming longer-pending Democrats. Without floor action, Russell's nomination was returned to the White House unconfirmed on January 3, 2017. The seat was later filled by Trump nominee Howard C. Nielson Jr.

=== Successful nominations ===
- United States District Court for the District of Rhode Island
  - John J. McConnell, Jr.: McConnell was first nominated on March 10, 2010. McConnell had donated hundreds of thousands of dollars to Democratic campaigns, including over eight thousand each to the campaigns of Rhode Island Senators Jack Reed and Sheldon Whitehouse. McConnell's critics contended that his prolific political contributions suggest that McConnell would be a partisan judge. On May 4, 2011, the Senate invoked cloture on McConnell's nomination in a 63–33 vote, and he was confirmed later that same day in a 50–44 vote. At the time, the cloture petition to break the filibuster marked one of the rare instances that such a motion had been required to force a vote on a district court nominee, with only three prior instances recorded.
- United States District Court for the Northern District of California
  - Edward M. Chen: Chen faced opposition due to his work as an attorney for the ACLU. On May 5, 2011, Senator Harry Reid received unanimous consent from the Senate to proceed to an executive session of the Senate at a future time, eliminating the need to file for cloture on Chen's nomination. On May 10, 2011, Chen was confirmed by a 56–42 vote.
- United States District Court for the District of Arizona
  - Rosemary Márquez: On June 23, 2011, President Obama nominated Marquez, a Tucson defense attorney, to the federal court in Arizona. However, Arizona's two Republican senators, John McCain and Jon Kyl, refused to return their blue slips. McCain said that he did not believe that Marquez was qualified, telling a newspaper, "I've been working with Sen. Kyl, but we do not feel at this time that she's qualified." On January 28, 2014, the Senate Judiciary Committee held a hearing on her nomination as well as five other individuals nominated to the same court. She was confirmed on May 15, 2014, by a vote of 81–15.
- United States District Court for the Eastern District of Missouri
  - Ronnie L. White: On November 7, 2013, President Obama nominated Missouri Supreme Court Justice White to serve on the United States District Court for the Eastern District of Missouri. White had previously been nominated for the same position by President Bill Clinton in 1997, but the nomination was defeated. The nomination drew controversy, as Republicans charged White as being a liberal ideologue who was biased in favor of criminal defendants. He received a hearing before the United States Senate Judiciary Committee on May 20, 2014. On June 19, 2014, his nomination was reported out of committee by a vote of 10–8. On July 16, 2014, the Senate voted 54–43 for cloture on White's nomination, ending a Republican-led filibuster. Later that same day, senators voted 53–44 to confirm White.

== Impacts of vacancies ==
A 2016 study found that the current rate of federal judicial vacancies (10 percent) had led prosecutors to dismiss more cases and had led defendants to be more likely to plead guilty and less likely to be incarcerated. The authors found that "the current rate of vacancies has resulted in 1,000 fewer prison inmates annually compared to a fully-staffed court system, a 1.5 percent decrease."

== Nominations that were made at the end of Obama's term and later renominated ==
=== Successful renominations ===
- United States District Court for the District of Colorado
  - Regina M. Rodriguez: On April 28, 2016, President Barack Obama nominated Rodriguez to serve as a United States District Judge of the United States District Court for the District of Colorado, to the seat vacated by Judge Robert E. Blackburn, who took senior status on April 12, 2016. Ramirez generated little controversy, but her nomination expired on January 3, 2017, with the end of the 114th Congress, with Trump nominee Daniel D. Domenico being appointed instead. On April 19, 2021, President Joe Biden renominated Rodriguez to the seat vacated by Judge Marcia S. Krieger, who took senior status on March 3, 2019. On June 8, 2021, her nomination was confirmed by a U.S. Senate vote of 72–28.
- United States District Court for the District of Columbia
  - Florence Y. Pan: On April 28, 2016, President Barack Obama nominated Pan to serve as a United States District Judge of the United States District Court for the District of Columbia, to the seat vacated by Judge Reggie Walton, who took senior status on December 31, 2015. Pan was recommended by the American Bar Association and generated no controversy. On July 13, 2016, a hearing on her nomination was held before the United States Senate Committee on the Judiciary. On September 15, 2016, her nomination was reported out of committee by voice vote. Her nomination expired on January 3, 2017, with the end of the 114th Congress, with Trump nominee Dabney L. Friedrich being appointed instead. On March 30, 2021, President Joe Biden announced his intent to nominate Pan to serve as a United States district judge for the United States District Court for the District of Columbia. On June 15, 2021, her nomination was sent to the Senate. President Biden nominated Pan to the seat vacated by Judge Ketanji Brown Jackson, who was nominated to serve as a Circuit Judge for the D.C. Circuit. On September 23, 2021, the Senate confirmed her nomination by a vote of 68–30.
- United States District Court for the Middle District of Florida
  - William F. Jung: On April 28, 2016, President Obama nominated Jung to serve as a judge of the United States District Court for the Middle District of Florida, to the seat vacated by Anne C. Conway, who took senior status on August 1, 2015. Jung had been previously nominated for the same court by President George W. Bush in 2008, but the nomination was not acted upon by Senate Democrats, with Obama nominee Charlene Honeywell being appointed to that seat instead. Like before, his nomination drew no controversy. For this 2016 nomination, the American Bar Association Standing Committee on the Federal Judiciary rated Jung unanimously "Well Qualified." In spite of this, his nomination expired on January 3, 2017, with the end of the 114th Congress. On December 21, 2017, he was nominated a third time by President Trump. On February 14, 2018, a hearing on his nomination was held. On March 15, 2018, his nomination was reported out of committee by voice vote. On September 6, 2018, his nomination was confirmed by voice vote.
- United States District Court for the District of Idaho
  - David Nye: On the recommendation of Senators Mike Crapo and Jim Risch, President Obama nominated state Appellate Judge Nye on April 5, 2016, to serve as a judge of the United States District Court for the District of Idaho. Nye was nominated to the seat vacated by Edward Lodge, who took senior status on July 3, 2015. The Senate Judiciary Committee held a hearing on June 21, 2016. On July 14, 2016, his nomination was reported out of committee by voice vote. His nomination expired on January 3, 2017, with the end of the 114th Congress. Senators Crapo and Risch indicated that if Nye was not confirmed in the 114th Congress, then they would recommend him to President Trump for renomination in the 115th Congress. He was subsequently renominated by Trump in 2017, and his nomination was confirmed unanimously on July 12, 2017.
- United States District Court for the District of Maryland
  - Stephanie A. Gallagher: On September 8, 2015, President Obama nominated Gallagher to serve as a judge of the United States District Court for the District of Maryland, to the seat vacated by William D. Quarles Jr., who took senior status on February 1, 2016. She received a hearing before the Senate Judiciary Committee on April 20, 2016. On May 19, 2016, her nomination was reported out of committee by voice vote. Her nomination expired on January 3, 2017, with the end of the 114th Congress. On June 7, 2018, President Trump announced his intent to renominate Gallagher to the same seat. On June 11, 2018, her nomination was sent to the Senate. On October 11, 2018, her nomination was reported out of committee by a 20–1 vote. On January 3, 2019, her nomination was returned to the President under Rule XXXI, Paragraph 6 of the United States Senate. On April 8, 2019, Trump announced the renomination of Gallagher. On May 21, 2019, her nomination was sent to the Senate. On September 11, 2019, her nomination was confirmed by a voice vote.
- United States District Court for the District of Nevada
  - Anne Traum: On April 28, 2016, President Barack Obama nominated Traum to serve as a United States district judge of the United States District Court for the District of Nevada, to the seat vacated by Judge Robert Clive Jones, who took senior status on February 1, 2016. Her nomination expired on January 3, 2017, with the end of the 114th Congress. On November 3, 2021, President Joe Biden announced his intent to nominate Traum to serve as a United States district judge of the United States District Court for the District of Nevada. On December 15, 2021, a hearing on her nomination was held before the Senate Judiciary Committee. On January 3, 2022, her nomination was returned to the President under Rule XXXI, Paragraph 6 of the United States Senate; and she was later renominated the same day. On March 23, 2022, the United States Senate confirmed her nomination by a 49–47 vote.
- United States District Court for the District of New Jersey
  - Julien Xavier Neals: In 2015, Obama nominated Neals to be a United States district judge to the seat vacated by Judge Faith S. Hochberg, who retired on March 6, 2015. His nomination generated no controversy and the U.S. Senate Judiciary Committee voted to approve the nomination on a voice vote. However, the full U.S. Senate never acted upon the nomination. The seat would eventually be filled by Biden nominee Evelyn Padin. On March 30, 2021, President Joe Biden renominated Neals to the seat vacated by William J. Martini, who took senior status on February 10, 2015. On June 8, 2021, his nomination was confirmed by a U.S. Senate vote of 66–33.
- United States District Court for the Eastern District of New York
  - Gary R. Brown: On July 30, 2015, President Obama nominated Brown to serve as a judge of the United States District Court for the Eastern District of New York, to the seat vacated by Sandra J. Feuerstein, who assumed senior status on January 21, 2015. He received a hearing before the Senate Judiciary Committee on October 21, 2015. Brown generated no controversy and on November 5, 2015, his nomination was reported out of committee by voice vote. His nomination expired on January 3, 2017, at the end of the 114th Congress. In August 2017, Brown was one of several candidates pitched by the White House to U.S. senators from New York Chuck Schumer and Kirsten Gillibrand as judicial candidates for vacancies on the federal courts in New York. On May 10, 2018, President Trump announced his intent to renominate Brown to the same seat. On May 15, 2018, his nomination was sent to the Senate. On September 13, 2018, his nomination was reported out of committee by a 21–0 vote. On January 3, 2019, her nomination was returned to the President under Rule XXXI, Paragraph 6 of the United States Senate. On April 8, 2019, Trump announced the renomination of Brown to the same seat. On May 21, 2019, his nomination was sent to the Senate. On December 19, 2019, his nomination was confirmed by voice vote.
  - Diane Gujarati: On September 13, 2016, President Obama nominated Gujarati to serve as a judge of the United States District Court for the Eastern District of New York, to the seat vacated by John Gleeson, who resigned on March 9, 2016. No one objected to Gujarti, but her nomination came late in a Presidential election year and was not acted upon. Her nomination expired on January 3, 2017, with the end of the 114th Congress. In August 2017, Gujarati was one of several candidates pitched to New York senators Chuck Schumer and Kirsten Gillibrand by the White House as judicial candidates for vacancies on the federal courts in New York. On May 10, 2018, President Trump announced his intent to renominate Gujarati to the same seat. On May 15, 2018, her nomination was sent to the Senate. On August 1, 2018, a hearing on her nomination was held before the Senate Judiciary Committee. On September 13, 2018, her nomination was reported out of committee by a 21–0 vote. On January 3, 2019, her nomination was returned to the President under Rule XXXI, Paragraph 6 of the United States Senate. On April 8, 2019, Trump announced the renomination of Gujarati. On May 21, 2019, her nomination was sent to the Senate. On September 10, 2020, her nomination was confirmed by a U.S. Senate vote of 99–0. Gujarati is the first Indian American to serve as an Article III federal judge in New York.
- United States District Court for the Western District of Oklahoma
  - Scott L. Palk: An Assistant Dean of Students at the University of Oklahoma College of Law, Palk's nomination was the result of a compromise between President Obama and Oklahoma's home-state Senators. On December 16, 2015, Obama nominated Palk to serve as a judge of the United States District Court for the Western District of Oklahoma, to the seat vacated by Stephen P. Friot, who took senior status on December 1, 2014. He received a hearing before the Senate Judiciary Committee on April 20, 2016. On May 19, 2016, his nomination was reported out of committee by voice vote. His nomination expired on January 3, 2017, with the end of the 114th Congress. On May 8, 2017, he was renominated by President Trump, and his nomination was confirmed on October 26, 2017, by a vote of 79–16.
- United States District Court for the Eastern District of Pennsylvania
  - John Milton Younge: On July 30, 2015, President Obama nominated longtime state Common Pleas Judge Younge to serve as a judge of the United States District Court for the Eastern District of Pennsylvania, to the seat vacated by Mary A. McLaughlin, who assumed senior status on November 18, 2013. He received a hearing before the Senate Judiciary Committee on December 9, 2015. His nomination expired on January 3, 2017, with the end of the 114th Congress. On July 13, 2018. President Trump announced his intent to renominate Younge to the same seat. On July 17, 2018, his nomination was sent to the Senate. On July 31, 2019, the Senate confirmed his nomination by voice vote.
- United States District Court for the Western District of Pennsylvania
  - Susan Paradise Baxter: On July 30, 2015, President Obama nominated Baxter to serve as a judge on the United States District Court for the Western District of Pennsylvania, to the seat vacated by Sean J. McLaughlin who resigned on August 16, 2013. She received a hearing on December 9, 2015. On January 28, 2016, her nomination was reported out of committee by voice vote. Her nomination expired on January 3, 2017, with the end of the 114th Congress. On December 20, 2017, her renomination to the same seat was announced by President Trump and sent to the Senate. On February 15, 2018, the Senate Judiciary Committee voted to support her nomination on a voice vote. On August 28, 2018, her nomination was confirmed by voice vote.
  - Marilyn Horan: On July 30, 2015, President Obama nominated Judge Horan to serve as a judge of the United States District Court for the Western District of Pennsylvania, to the seat vacated by Terrence F. McVerry, who assumed senior status on September 30, 2013. She received a hearing on December 9, 2015. On January 28, 2016, her nomination was reported out of committee by voice vote. Her nomination expired on January 3, 2017, with the end of the 114th Congress, with Trump nominee Peter J. Phipps being appointed to the seat instead. On December 20, 2017, her renomination to the same court was announced by President Trump and sent to the Senate. She was nominated to the seat vacated by Gary L. Lancaster, who died on April 24, 2013. On February 15, 2018, the Senate Judiciary Committee voted to support her nomination on a voice vote. On September 6, 2018, her nomination was confirmed by voice vote.
  - Robert J. Colville: On July 30, 2015, President Obama nominated Colville to the seat vacated due to the death of Judge Gary L. Lancaster, on April 24, 2013. He received a hearing before the Senate Judiciary Committee on December 9, 2015. His nomination expired on January 3, 2017, with the end of the 114th Congress, with fellow former Obama nominee Marilyn Horan being appointed instead. On March 1, 2019, President Trump announced his intent to nominate Colville to serve as a United States district judge for the United States District Court for the Western District of Pennsylvania. On March 5, 2019, his nomination was sent to the Senate. President Trump nominated Colville to the seat vacated by Arthur J. Schwab, who took senior status on January 1, 2018. On May 9, 2019, his nomination was reported out of committee by a 15–7 vote. On December 19, 2019, his nomination was confirmed by a vote of 66–27.
- United States District Court for the District of Rhode Island
  - Mary S. McElroy: On September 8, 2015, President Obama nominated McElroy to serve as a judge of the United States District Court for the District of Rhode Island, to the seat vacated by Mary M. Lisi, who took senior status on October 1, 2015. She received a hearing before the Senate Judiciary Committee on December 9, 2015. On January 28, 2016, her nomination was reported out of committee by voice vote. Her nomination expired on January 3, 2017, with the end of the 114th Congress. On April 10, 2018, President Trump announced his intent to renominate McElroy to the same seat. On April 12, 2018, her nomination was sent to the Senate. On October 11, 2018, her nomination was reported out of committee by a 19–2 vote. On January 3, 2019, her nomination was returned to the President under Rule XXXI, Paragraph 6 of the United States Senate. On April 8, 2019, Trump announced the renomination of McElroy. On May 21, 2019, her nomination was sent to the Senate. On September 11, 2019, her nomination was confirmed by a voice vote.
- United States District Court for the District of South Carolina
  - Donald C. Coggins Jr.: On February 25, 2016, President Obama nominated Coggins to serve as a judge of the United States District Court for the District of South Carolina, to the seat vacated by Joseph F. Anderson, who took senior status on November 16, 2014. On June 21, 2016, a hearing was held on his nomination. On July 14, 2016, his nomination was reported out of committee by voice vote. His nomination expired on January 3, 2017, with the end of the 114th Congress. On August 3, 2017, President Trump renominated Coggins to the same seat. His nomination was reported out of committee by voice vote on September 14, 2017. On November 16, 2017, his nomination was confirmed by a vote of 96–0.
- United States District Court for the Eastern District of Texas
  - Karen Gren Scholer: On March 15, 2016, President Obama nominated former Dallas County Judge Scholer to serve as a judge of the United States District Court for the Eastern District of Texas, to the seat vacated by Richard A. Schell, who took senior status on March 10, 2015. Scholer was nominated with the support of Texas's two senators, both Republicans, in a compromise. On September 7, 2016, a hearing was held on her nomination. Her nomination expired on January 3, 2017, with the end of the 114th Congress, with Trump nominee Sean D. Jordan being appointed instead. On September 7, 2017, President Trump nominated her to serve on the United States District Court for the Northern District of Texas, to the seat vacated by Jorge Antonio Solis, who retired on May 1, 2016. On October 26, 2017, her nomination was reported out of committee by voice vote. On March 5, the Senate confirmed her in a 95–0 vote.
- United States District Court for the Northern District of Texas
  - James Wesley Hendrix: On March 15, 2016, President Obama nominated Hendrix to serve as a judge of the United States District Court for the Northern District of Texas, to the seat vacated by Jorge Antonio Solis, who retired on May 1, 2016. On September 7, 2016, a hearing was held on his nomination. His nomination expired on January 3, 2017, with the end of the 114th Congress, with fellow former Obama nominee Karen Gren Scholer being appointed instead. On January 16, 2019, President Trump announced his intent to renominate Hendrix to the same court. On January 17, 2019, his nomination was sent to the Senate. Trump nominated Hendrix to the seat on the United States District Court for the Northern District of Texas vacated by Samuel Ray Cummings, who took senior status on December 31, 2014. On July 30, 2019, his nomination was confirmed by a vote of 89–1.
- United States District Court for the Western District of Texas
  - Walter David Counts III: On March 15, 2016, President Obama nominated U.S. Magistrate Judge Counts to serve as a judge of the United States District Court for the Western District of Texas, to the seat vacated by Robert A. Junell, who took senior status on February 13, 2015. Counts was selected as a compromise between the Obama White House and the state's two U.S. senators, both Republicans. On September 7, 2016, a hearing was held on his nomination. While Counts generated no controversy, the nomination expired on January 3, 2017, with the end of the 114th Congress. On September 7, 2017, President Trump renominated Counts to the same seat. On October 26, 2017, his nomination was reported out of committee by voice vote. On January 11, 2018, the Senate voted to confirm Counts by a vote of 96–0.

== See also ==
- Barack Obama Supreme Court candidates
- United States federal judge
- Judicial appointment history for United States federal courts
- Deaths of United States federal judges in active service
