= Sandra Doorley =

American lawyer

District Attorney of Monroe County, New York
- In office January 1, 2012 – August 31, 2025
- Preceded by: Michael Charles Green
- Succeeded by: Brian Green

Personal details
- Party: Republican (2015–2025); Democratic (2009–2015); Republican (before 2009)
- Education: University at Albany (BA); Syracuse University (JD)
- Profession: Attorney
- Known for: First woman to serve as Monroe County District Attorney, and viral police interaction video

Sandra Doorley is an American attorney. She was the District Attorney of Monroe County, New York, from 2012 until 2025. She took office in January 2012, succeeding Michael Charles Green. Doorley is the first woman to serve as Monroe County District Attorney. Doorley changed political parties twice over the course of her career, beginning as a Republican, registering as a Democrat in 2009, and then returning to the Republican party in 2015. Following a 2024 viral video that showed her invoking her position in an attempt to avoid a speeding ticket, Doorley was investigated and censured by both Monroe County and New York State ethics boards. She retired in August of 2025 without completing her final term.

== Education ==
Doorley obtained a bachelor's degree from the University at Albany and received her Juris Doctor degree from Syracuse University.

== Career ==
Before becoming district attorney, Doorley was a prosecutor in the Monroe County District Attorney's Office for approximately 20 years.

In November 2011, Doorley was elected Monroe County District Attorney, defeating Republican candidate Bill Taylor. She was sworn in on December 30, 2011, at the Rochester Girls and Boys Club. Michael Charles Green (whom she succeeded) joined Doorley's office as an advisor, but departed in February 2012 for another position. She is the first woman to hold the office of District Attorney in Monroe County.

In 2015, Doorley switched her party affiliation to the Republican Party. "Don't judge me by the political party that I'm affiliated with," she said. "Look at the work that I've done". Doorley was re-elected in 2015, 2019, and 2023.

Despite previously indicating that she intended to complete her term, Doorley announced her retirement on August 1, 2025, effective August 31. Governor Hochul appointed her successor, Irondequoit judge Brian Green, to the District Attorney office the following month.

== 2024 traffic stop incident ==
On April 22, 2024, Doorley was spotted by Webster Police traveling at 55 mph (89 km/h) in a 35 mph (56 km/h) zone. The observing officer activated his emergency lights and siren and attempted to conduct a traffic stop, but Doorley did not pull over; instead, she drove home and called the Webster Chief of Police while being pursued. Webster Police body cam footage shows Doorley displaying her badge, refusing to follow orders, and directing expletives at the investigating officer while repeatedly invoking her position. Doorley stated, “I am going to prosecute myself. You know what I am going to do with the ticket?” Doorley received a speeding ticket. In a statement the following day, Doorley apologized for her conduct and informed the public that she had pleaded guilty to the speeding ticket. Video of the confrontation between Doorley and the officer went viral.

Governor Kathy Hochul referred Doorley to the Commission on Prosecutorial Conduct in the aftermath of the traffic stop incident. The Monroe County Office of Public Integrity opened its own investigation, and in July released a report finding that Doorley's behavior was "rude at best, and more accurately described as abusive", and noted that her unsafe driving of a county-owned vehicle and attempt to "secure unwarranted privileges or exemptions" for herself were both violations of county ethics codes. It referred the case to the Monroe County Board of Ethics for action and cooperation with other investigating agencies. In July 2025, the Commission on Prosecutorial Conduct issued a 13-page report on the incident, noting that Doorley had testified about her intentions to vacate her position and recommending that she be publicly censured for her misconduct.

== See also ==
- List of American politicians who switched parties in office
