= James Halpern =

American judge (born 1945)

Jim Halpern

Senior Judge of the United States Tax Court
- Incumbent
- Assumed office October 16, 2015
- In office July 2, 2005 – December 1, 2000

Judge of the United States Tax Court
- In office November 2, 2005 – October 16, 2015
- Appointed by: George W. Bush
- Preceded by: Himself
- Succeeded by: Elizabeth A. Copeland
- In office July 3, 1990 – July 2, 2005
- Appointed by: George H. W. Bush
- Preceded by: Meade Whitaker
- Succeeded by: Himself

Personal details
- Born: October 16, 1945 (age 80) New York City, New York, U.S.
- Spouse: Nancy Nord
- Education: University of Pennsylvania (BA, JD); New York University (LLM)

James S. Halpern (born October 16, 1945, in Brooklyn, New York) is an American lawyer who serves as a senior judge of the United States Tax Court.

Halpern attended Hackley School in Tarrytown, New York until 1963 and earned a B.S. at the Wharton School of the University of Pennsylvania in 1967. He received a Juris Doctor from the University of Pennsylvania Law School in 1972, followed by a Master of Laws in taxation from New York University Law School in 1975, earned while he worked as an associate in the law firm of Mudge, Rose, Guthrie and Alexander in New York City.

He taught law at Washington and Lee University and St. John's University, and New York University until 1979, then briefly returned to private practice with Roberts and Holland in New York City before joining the legal staff of the Internal Revenue Service from 1980 to 1983.

He was a partner with Baker Hostetler in Washington, D.C. from 1983 to 1990, while also teaching on a limited basis at George Washington University.

Halpern was appointed by President George H. W. Bush as Judge, United States Tax Court, on July 3, 1990, for a term ending July 2, 2005, and re-appointed by George W. Bush on November 2, 2005, for a term ending November 1, 2020. He retired on October 16, 2015, but continues to perform judicial duties as senior judge on recall.

Halpern is married to former Consumer Product Safety Commission acting chair, Nancy Nord. He has a son and daughter.

== Other ==
- Colonel, U.S. Army Reserve (retired).

== Notes ==
Legal offices
Preceded by Meade Whitaker	Judge of the United States Tax Court; 1990–2005	Succeeded by Himself
Preceded by Himself	Judge of the United States Tax Court; 2005–2015	Succeeded by Elizabeth A. Copeland
