= Judge Tidwell =

Judge Tidwell may refer to:

- George Ernest Tidwell (1931–2011), judge of the United States District Court for the Northern District of Georgia
- Moody R. Tidwell III (1939–2026), judge of the United States Court of Federal Claims
