= Edward C. DuMont =

American lawyer (born 1961)

Edward DuMont
- Born: December 1961 (age 64); Oakland, California, U.S.
- Education: Yale University (BA); Stanford University (JD)

Edward Carroll DuMont (born December 1961) is a former Solicitor General of California. In 2010 and 2011 he was nominated by President Barack Obama to a seat on the United States Court of Appeals for the Federal Circuit. In November 2011, however, DuMont sent a letter to President Obama asking him to withdraw his nomination to the judgeship. Obama withdrew DuMont's nomination on November 10, 2011, nominating Richard G. Taranto in DuMont's place. DuMont thereafter served for five years as solicitor general of the state of California.

== Early life and education ==
Born in Oakland, California, and raised in northern California, DuMont received a Bachelor of Arts (summa cum laude, Phi Beta Kappa, Warren Memorial High Scholarship Prize) from Yale University in 1983, and a Juris Doctor from Stanford Law School in 1986. DuMont then served as a law clerk to Judge Richard A. Posner of the United States Court of Appeals for the Seventh Circuit from 1986 to 1987. After his clerkship, he was awarded a Henry Luce Scholarship, which allowed him to spend a year working at a law firm in Bangkok, Thailand.

== Career ==
DuMont spent several years as an assistant to the United States Solicitor General at that time, Seth Waxman, and as an associate deputy attorney general in the United States Department of Justice, handling issues relating to computer crime, e-commerce and privacy. DuMont has argued twenty cases before the Supreme Court of the United States, and has briefed many more. Those cases have covered a wide range of legal issues.

DuMont joined WilmerHale in 2002.

=== Failed nomination to the Federal Circuit ===
On April 14, 2010, President Barack Obama nominated DuMont to fill the vacancy on the United States Court of Appeals for the Federal Circuit that was to be created by Judge Paul Redmond Michel retiring on May 31, 2010. DuMont's nomination languished for more than 18 months without a hearing. NPR commented on the delay in an August 4, 2011 article, stating that "Some of the longest waiting nominees, Louis B. Butler of Wisconsin, Charles Bernard Day of Maryland and Edward Dumont of Washington happen to be black or openly gay".

DuMont would have been the first openly gay United States appeals court judge. His partner is Newton Kendig.

The United States Senate Committee on the Judiciary never scheduled a hearing on the nomination. On November 9, 2011, the National Law Journal reported that DuMont had submitted a letter to President Obama, asking that the president withdraw his nomination. Obama did so on November 10, 2011. The seat was then filled by Obama's appointment of Richard G. Taranto.

=== California Solicitor General ===
After his failed judicial nomination, DuMont remained at WilmerHale. On October 28, 2013, California Attorney General Kamala Harris appointed DuMont to be California's solicitor general, serving as the chief appellate lawyer for the California Department of Justice. DuMont stepped down effective August 19, 2019, and was succeeded by Michael Mongan.

== See also ==
- Barack Obama judicial appointment controversies
