= Judge Whitaker (disambiguation) =

Wetzel Whitaker (1908–1985) was a filmmaker and animator known as Judge Whitaker. Judge Whitaker may also refer to:

- Meade Whitaker (1919–2005), judge of the United States Tax Court
- Samuel Estill Whitaker (1886–1967), judge of the United States Court of Claims

== See also ==
- Charles Evans Whittaker (1901–1973), judge of the United States Court of Appeals for the Eighth Circuit before being elevated to the Supreme Court
