= Isaac Jack Martin =

American judge (1908–1966)

Associate Judge of the United States Court of Customs and Patent Appeals
- In office August 6, 1958 – November 5, 1966
- Appointed by: Dwight D. Eisenhower
- Preceded by: William Purington Cole Jr.
- Succeeded by: Phillip Baldwin

Personal details
- Born: Isaac Jack Martin; July 18, 1908 Cincinnati, Ohio
- Died: November 5, 1966 (aged 58) Washington, D.C.
- Resting place: United Jewish Cemetery; Evanston, Ohio
- Education: University of Cincinnati College of Law (LL.B.)

Isaac Jack Martin (July 18, 1908 – November 5, 1966) was an associate judge of the United States Court of Customs and Patent Appeals.

== Early life ==
Martin was born on July 18, 1908, in Cincinnati, Ohio. He received a Bachelor of Laws in 1932 from the University of Cincinnati College of Law, graduating Order of the Coif.

== Career ==
He entered private practice in Cincinnati from 1932 to 1940. He was an assistant prosecutor for Hamilton County, Ohio from 1933 to 1940. He was in private practice in Philadelphia, Pennsylvania from 1941 to 1944. He was an administrative assistant to United States Senator Robert A. Taft of Ohio from 1944 to 1953. He was an administrative assistant to President Dwight D. Eisenhower from 1953 to 1958.

=== Federal judicial service ===
Martin was nominated by President Dwight D. Eisenhower on July 18, 1958, to a seat on the United States Court of Customs and Patent Appeals vacated by Judge William Purington Cole Jr. He was confirmed by the United States Senate on August 5, 1958, and received his commission on August 6, 1958. Martin was initially appointed as a Judge under Article I, but the court was raised to Article III status by operation of law on August 25, 1958, and Martin thereafter served as an Article III Judge. His service terminated on November 5, 1966, due to his death.

== Death ==
Martin died November 5, 1966, in Washington, D.C. Martin was Jewish and is interred at the United Jewish Cemetery in Evanston, Ohio.

Legal offices
Preceded by William Purington Cole Jr.	Associate Judge of the United States Court of Customs and Patent Appeals; 1958–1966	Succeeded by Phillip Baldwin
