= Beth M. Andrus =

American judge

Beth Marie Andrus

Judge of the Court of Appeals of Washington, Division I
- Incumbent
- Assumed office June 2018
- Appointed by: Jay Inslee
- Preceded by: Ronald Cox

Judge of the Superior Court of Washington for King County
- In office July 2010 – June 2018
- Appointed by: Christine Gregoire
- Succeeded by: Mafé Rajul

Personal details
- Born: October 3, 1963 (age 62) Saginaw, Michigan, U.S.
- Education: Wayne State University (BA); University of Minnesota (JD)
- Profession: Attorney

Beth Marie Andrus (born October 3, 1963) is a Washington State Judge and is a former nominee to be a United States district judge of the United States District Court for the Western District of Washington.

== Biography ==
Andrus was born October 3, 1963, in Saginaw, Michigan. She received at Bachelor of Arts degree, summa cum laude, in 1985 from Wayne State University. She received a Juris Doctor, cum laude, in 1988 from the University of Minnesota Law School. She began her legal career as a law clerk to Judge Gerald Heaney of the United States Court of Appeals for the Eighth Circuit, from 1988 to 1989. She worked at the law firm of Schweppe, Krug & Tausend in 1989 and at the law firm of Miller, Nash, Weiner, Hager & Carlsen (now Miller, Nash, Graham & Dunn LLP), from 1990 to 1995, both firms located in Seattle, Washington. From 1995 to 2010, she was a partner at the law firm of Skellenger Bender, P.S., in Seattle. From 2010 to 2018, she served as a Superior Court Judge for Washington's King County Superior Court. In 2018, she was appointed to Division One of the Washington State Court of Appeals.

== Expired nomination to district court ==
On April 14, 2016, President Barack Obama nominated Andrus to serve as a United States District Judge of the United States District Court for the Western District of Washington, to the seat vacated by Judge Robert S. Lasnik, who took senior status on January 27, 2016. Her nomination expired on January 3, 2017, with the end of the 114th Congress.

== See also ==
- Barack Obama judicial appointment controversies
