= Miller Nash =

American law firm based in Portland, Oregon

Miller Nash LLP
- Headquarters: Portland, Oregon, United States; 45.5173°N 122.6781°W
- No. of offices: 6
- No. of attorneys: 147 (2024)
- Key people: Kieran J Curley (managing partner)
- Date founded: 1873
- Company type: Limited liability partnership
- Website: millernash.com

Miller Nash LLP is an American law firm based in Portland, Oregon. Founded in 1873, the firm operates as a limited liability partnership and has 147 attorneys across its offices. As of 2024, it was the third largest law firm in Portland, with 98 attorneys in the city. The firm's headquarters are in the 11W building in Downtown Portland, with additional offices in Seattle, Vancouver, Washington, Long Beach, California, Anchorage, Alaska and Boise, Idaho.

== History ==
The firm began in 1873 as Northup & Gilbert, founded by William B. Gilbert and Henry H. Northup. In 1876, former Oregon governor A. C. Gibbs joined the firm, but departed the following year. John M. Gearin joined in 1884 and later served in the U.S. Congress. Other notable partners included Wallace McCamant, W. Lair Thompson, and Ralph King, among others. In 1970, the firm moved into what is now the Standard Insurance Center, and the names Miller and Nash first appeared in the firm's title. The firm relocated to the U.S. Bancorp Tower in 1983 and opened an office in Seattle in 1985.

The Miller Nash name was adopted in 1999. In 2014, the firm announced a merger with Seattle-based Graham & Dunn, which was completed on January 2, 2015. The merger brought Graham & Dunn's Long Beach office into the firm, expanding its West Coast presence.

In 2023, the Seattle office moved from Pier 70 to 605 S Union Station in the Chinatown-International District (CID). In 2024, the Portland headquarters moved from the U.S. Bancorp tower to the newly built Eleven West building, and the firm opened a new office in Boise, Idaho

In 2012, the firm was criticized for representing fishermen involved in conflicts with the environmental group Sea Shepherd regarding safety at sea.

== Recognition ==
In the 2025 Chambers USA Guide, Miller Nash received 12 state practice area rankings and two national rankings, along with 29 individual attorney recognitions. The firm was ranked nationally for its Cannabis Law and Native American Law practices, and regionally in Oregon and Washington for areas including banking & finance, bankruptcy/restructuring, construction, corporate/M&A, insurance, intellectual property, labor and employment, litigation, and real estate.

Attorneys from the firm also routinely appear in Best Lawyers in America and Super Lawyers.

== Notable people ==
- Beth M. Andrus – Judge of the Washington State Court of Appeals, Division I
- Henry Breithaupt – Judge of the Oregon Tax Court (2001–2017)
- Stephen Bushong – Justice of the Oregon Supreme Court
- Elisa Dozono – Judge of the Multnomah County Circuit Court
- A. C. Gibbs – Governor of Oregon (1862–1866)
- William B. Gilbert – Judge of the U.S. Court of Appeals for the Ninth Circuit
- John M. Gearin – U.S. Congressman from Oregon (1907–1909)
- David Hercher – Bankruptcy Judge for the United States Bankruptcy Court, District of Oregon
- Wallace McCamant – Justice of the Oregon Supreme Court and Judge of the U.S. Court of Appeals
- Michael W. Mosman – U.S. Attorney for the District of Oregon and Judge of the U.S. District Court
- Teresa Pearson – Bankruptcy Judge for the United States Bankruptcy Court, District of Oregon
- W. Lair Thompson – Oregon state legislator and Senate President
- Max Williams – Oregon state legislator and Director of the Oregon Department of Corrections
