= Victoria F. Nourse =

American academic (born 1958)

Victoria Nourse
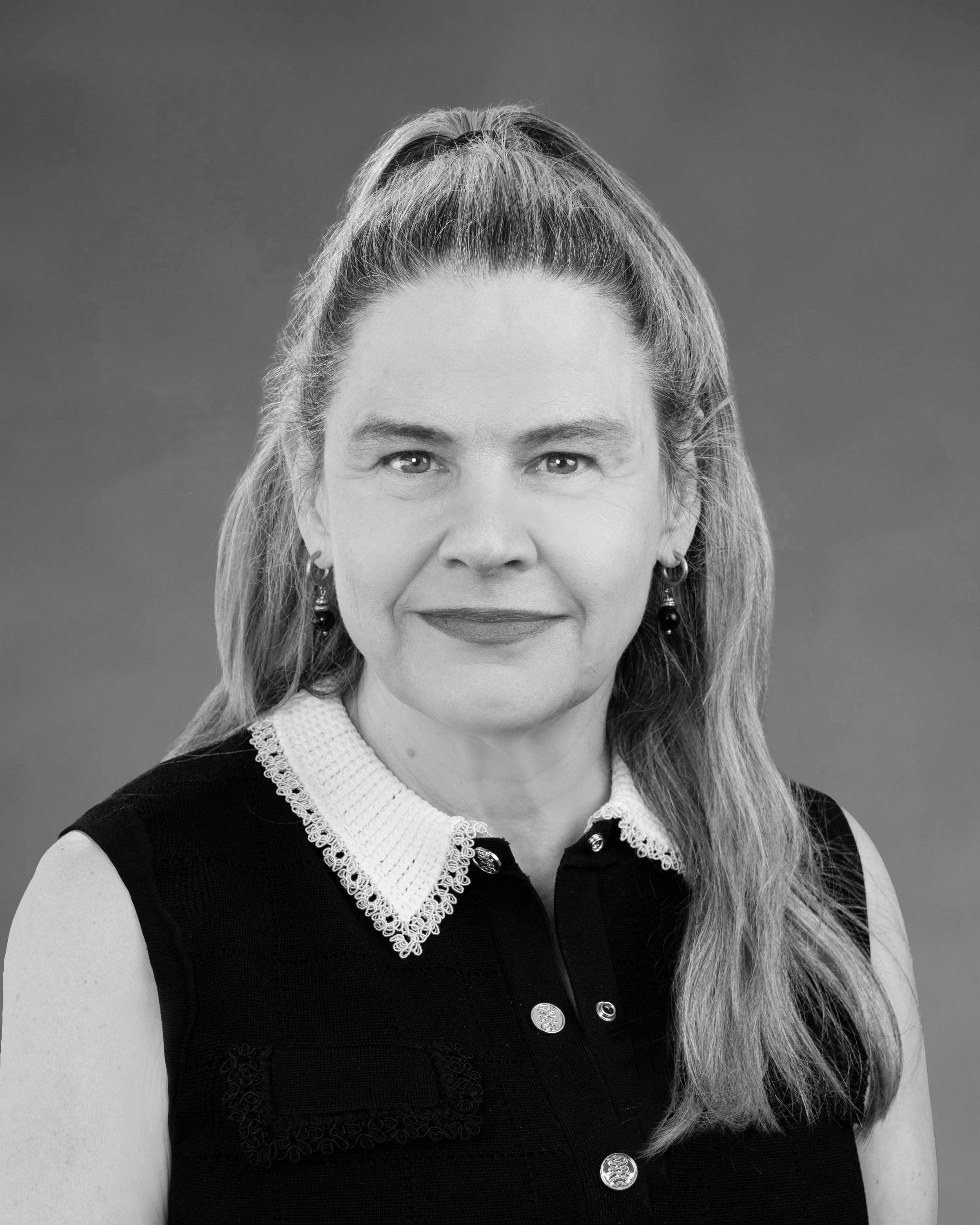
- Official portrait, 2023

Vice Chair of the United States Commission on Civil Rights
- Incumbent
- Assumed office July 21, 2023
- President: Joe Biden; Donald Trump
- Preceded by: Patricia Timmons-Goodson

Personal details
- Born: November 9, 1958 (age 67) Dunedin, Florida, U.S.
- Party: Democratic
- Education: Stanford University (BA); UC Berkeley School of Law (JD)
- Website: Official website

Victoria Frances Nourse (born November 9, 1958) is an American lawyer and executive director serving as the vice chair of the United States Commission on Civil Rights since 2023. A member of the Democratic Party, she has served as the professor at law at the Georgetown University Law Center since 2019.

Nourse has published extensively on Congress, the separation of powers and statutory interpretation. She regularly appears as a legal expert on media outlets such as CNN, PBS and NPR, providing interpretation of national judicial and political developments. Her more recent scholarship and public commentary have centered on the trials and impeachments of Donald Trump, the Supreme Court, and current challenges facing American democracy.

== Early life and education ==
Nourse was born in Dunedin, Florida, grew up in Marblehead Massachusetts, and received her Bachelor of Arts from Stanford University Phi Beta Kappa in 1980 and later received a Juris Doctor from the University of California, Berkeley School of Law in 1984, where she was named to the Order of the Coif.

== Career ==
=== Early career ===
After graduating from law school at UC Berkeley, Nourse clerked for Edward Weinfeld of the United States District Court for the Southern District of New York in 1984 and 1985. From 1985 to 1988, she worked in for the law firm of Paul, Weiss, Rifkind, Wharton & Garrison. In 1987 she worked as an assistant counsel on the United States Senate Committee to Investigate the Iran-Contra Affair.

From 1988 to 1990, Nourse was an appellate attorney with the United States Department of Justice working in the civil division. From 1990 to 1993, she worked as counsel and special counsel for the United States Senate Judiciary Committee and played a key role in drafting the Violence Against Women Act (VAWA) under the leadership of then-Senator Joe Biden. Despite Senator Biden's public recognition of Nourse's contribution, national controversy was generated when he subsequently claimed to have authored the Act.

Nourse's historic battle to uphold VAWA has been extensively documented in the media and books such as "Equal: Women Reshape American Law" by Fred Strebeigh. The book included Nourse alongside Supreme Court Justice Ruth Bader Ginsburg as a woman who had a history-changing effect on the law.

=== Academic career ===
From 1996 to 1997, Nourse was a visiting professor of law at the University of Maryland School of Law. From 1997 to 2002, Nourse was an associate professor of law at the University of Wisconsin Law School. During the fall semester of 2002, she was a visiting professor of law at Yale Law School and taught law at New York University School of Law in the spring of 2003. Nourse returned to the University of Wisconsin Law School from 2005 until 2008 as the Burrus-Bascom Professor. From 2008 to 2010, Nourse was the LQC Lamar Professor of Law at Emory University School of Law in Atlanta.

In February 2019, Nourse was installed as the inaugural Ralph V. Whitworth Professor of Law at the Georgetown University Law Center.

=== Consideration for the Seventh Circuit ===
On January 22, 2010, United States senators Herb Kohl and Russ Feingold forwarded four names to the Obama White House for consideration to fill the vacancy on the Seventh Circuit Court of Appeals created when Judge Terence T. Evans assumed senior status. Nourse was recommended along with District Court Judge Lynn Adelman, Richard Sankovitz, and Dean Strang. On July 14, 2010, Obama nominated Nourse to the vacancy. Her nomination was returned to the President on December 17, 2011, pursuant to the rules of the Senate.

=== United States Commission on Civil Rights ===
On March 16, 2023, Nourse was sworn in as a presidential appointee to the United States Commission on Civil Rights for a term of six years. On July 21, 2023, pursuant to her designation by President Biden, she was installed as Vice Chair of the commission by unanimous vote. Addressing her designation as Vice Chair in April 2023, Nourse spoke of President Biden's longstanding influence on her political philosophy: "He taught me everything I know about bipartisanship... I know that we can work together. I've done it before."

== Personal ==
Nourse is married with two children. She was the daughter-in-law of United States federal judge Richard D. Cudahy.

== See also ==
- United States Commission on Civil Rights
- Violence Against Women Act
- Iran–Contra affair
- Barack Obama judicial appointment controversies
