= William L. Thomas =

American judge

William Thomas
- Born: 1967 (age 58–59); Uniontown, Pennsylvania, U.S.
- Education: Washington & Jefferson College (BA); Temple University (JD)

William L. Thomas (born 1967) is a circuit judge for Florida's Eleventh Judicial Circuit and former nominee for United States district judge for the United States District Court for the Southern District of Florida.

== Background ==
Thomas was raised by his mother, who raised ten children on her own after his father's death in a car accident. Thomas grew up with his family on welfare and living in housing projects in the small town of Republic, in Southwestern Pennsylvania. The housing project (Dunlap Creek Village Projects) was located in a neighborhood marred by crime and violence. Thomas' mother emphasized sacrifice and education and helped instill in Thomas a strong desire to earn an education and realize his goals in life.

Thomas earned a Bachelor of Arts degree from Washington & Jefferson College in 1991 and a Juris Doctor from Temple University Beasley School of Law in 1994. He became an assistant state public defender in Miami-Dade County in 1994 and was selected to become an assistant federal public defender in the Southern District of Florida in 1997 where he represented defendants in all types of complex cases (including drug conspiracy, Hobbs Act robbery and fraud) in federal court.

== Judicial service ==
In 2005, Thomas was elected to be a judge on the Miami-Dade Circuit Court, where he has presided over both civil cases (including complex medical malpractice, business litigation, tobacco litigation, eminent domain, wrongful death) and criminal cases (including death penalty, murder, robbery, rape). In the 2011 Judicial Elections, despite other incumbent judges drawing opposition, Judge Thomas was re-elected without opposition.

=== Failed federal district court nomination ===
On November 14, 2012, President Barack Obama nominated Thomas to a seat on the United States District Court for the Southern District of Florida to replace U.S. District Judge Adalberto Jordan whose nomination to the U.S. Court of Appeals for the Eleventh Circuit was approved in February 2012. Thomas is openly gay. If confirmed, Thomas will be the first out gay African American man to serve as a federal judge. On January 2, 2013, his nomination was returned to the President, due to the sine die adjournment of the Senate.

On January 3, 2013, he was renominated to the same office. On September 19, 2013, Senator Marco Rubio announced that he would not return his blue slip for Thomas, effectively preventing the possibility of a hearing or confirmation vote, even though Rubio had suggested Thomas for the post in the first place. Thomas' nomination was returned to the President due to the sine die adjournment of Congress on January 3, 2014. President Obama has decided not to submit Thomas' nomination a third time.

In May 2021, Thomas was once again considered for an appointment to the U.S. District Court for the Southern District of Florida, applying for and securing an interview with Representative Debbie Wasserman Schultz's Florida Federal Judicial Nominating Commission for the Southern District of Florida. However, it was announced later in the month that he had ultimately not been among the finalists whose names were submitted for recommendation by Wasserman Schultz to President Joe Biden for nomination to one of the two open seats that were open on the court at the time.

== See also ==
- Barack Obama judicial appointment controversies
- List of LGBT jurists in the United States
