= Charles Bernard Day =

American judge (born 1957)

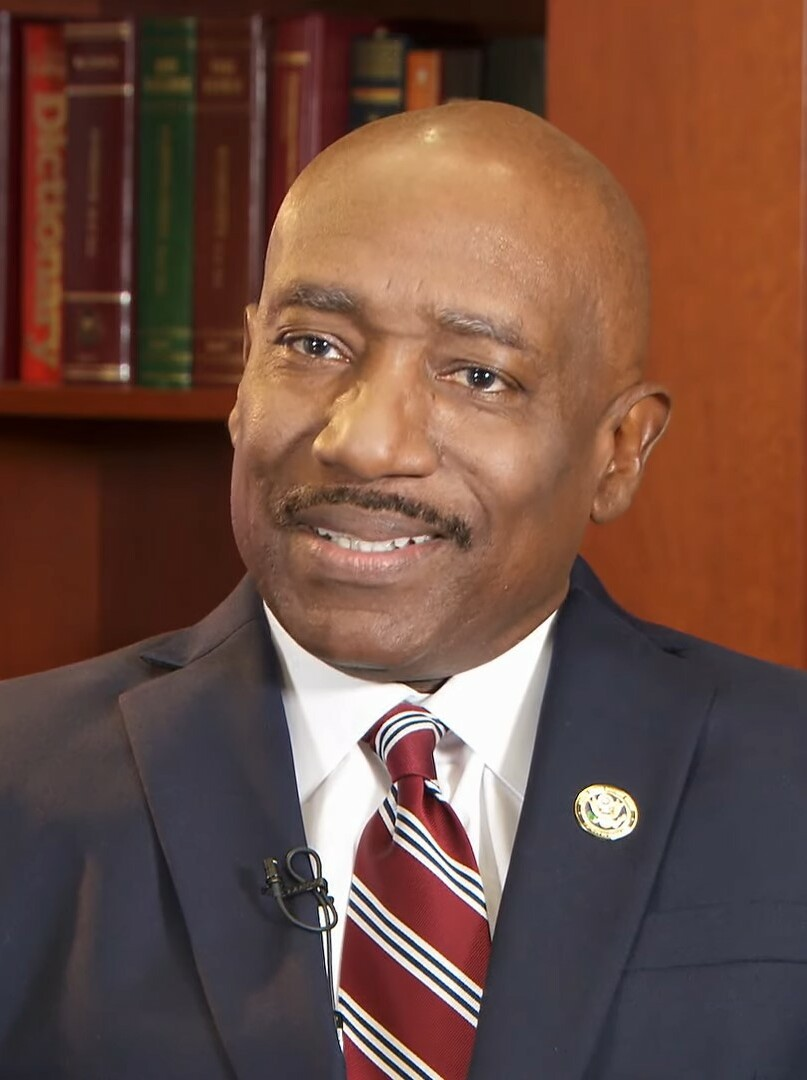
- Day in 2019

Magistrate Judge of the United States District Court for the District of Maryland
- In office 1997 – April 12, 2022

Personal details
- Born: April 12, 1957 (age 69)
- Education: University of Maryland (BA, JD); American University (MS)

Charles Bernard Day (born April 12, 1957) is a former United States magistrate judge and former nominee to be a United States district judge of the United States District Court for the District of Maryland. His nomination to a life-tenure, federal district court judgeship during 2010 and 2011 ran aground amid opposition from Republican senators, who objected to moving forward with a United States Senate Committee on the Judiciary hearing on his nomination after what were reported to be "insurmountable concerns" by Republicans over matters raised during Day's background investigation.

== Early life and education ==
Day was born on April 12, 1957 in Dothan, Alabama. He earned a Bachelor of Arts in criminal justice from the University of Maryland in 1978, a Master of Science in judicial administration in 1980 from American University and a Juris Doctor in 1984 from the University of Maryland School of Law.

== Career ==
Day began his legal career in 1985 as an assistant state's attorney for Montgomery County, Maryland. In 1989, he joined the Washington, D.C. law firm Sherman, Meehan, Curtin & Ain, working as a civil litigation attorney with the firm, being promoted to partner in 1995.

=== Federal judicial service ===
In 1997, Day was appointed by the judges on the United States District Court for the District of Maryland to be a federal magistrate judge. He retired on April 12, 2022.

=== Failed nomination to federal district court ===
On July 21, 2010, President Barack Obama nominated Day to a judicial seat on the United States District Court for the District of Maryland, to fill the vacancy created by the Judge Peter J. Messitte to assume senior status. Day's nomination lapsed at the end of 2010, and President Obama renominated him on January 5, 2011.

However, Day's nomination languished for more than a year, and he never received a hearing before the United States Senate Committee on the Judiciary, which is the standard procedure for a judicial nominee to be considered for a floor vote before the full Senate. NPR commented on the delay in an August 4, 2011 article, stating that "Some of the longest waiting nominees, Louis B. Butler of Wisconsin, Charles Bernard Day of Maryland and Edward C. DuMont of Washington happen to be black or openly gay". Without comment, Obama withdrew Day's nomination on October 31, 2011.

After Day's nomination was withdrawn, a spokeswoman for U.S. Sen. Charles Grassley, the ranking member of the U.S. Senate Judiciary Committee, told the Blog of Legal Times in an e-mail that some committee members had "insurmountable concerns" about matters raised during Day's background investigation. Those concerns, which the spokeswoman declined to elaborate on, were what prompted Republican senators to block a committee hearing on Day. The spokeswoman also told the Blog of Legal Times that Day "is aware of those problems and is free to share that information if he so desires."

In the wake of the failed nomination, Maryland's two Democratic senators, Barbara Mikulski and Ben Cardin, issued a joint statement stating that they were "very disappointed" that Day's nomination had stalled in committee. "Judge Day is an extraordinary jurist, greatly respected by the Maryland legal community," the statement read. "He has the experience and qualities that are needed in our judges. He also understands the day to day lives of ordinary Americans, and the need for their rights to be protected."

== See also ==
- Barack Obama judicial appointment controversies
- List of African-American jurists
