= Louis Spector =

American judge (1918–2003)

Judge of the United States Court of Federal Claims
- In office October 1, 1982 – May 31, 1983
- Appointed by: operation of law
- Preceded by: seat established
- Succeeded by: Moody R. Tidwell III

Personal details
- Born: April 4, 1918 Niagara Falls, New York, U.S.
- Died: January 4, 2003 (aged 84) Falls Church, Virginia, U.S.
- Education: Niagara University; University of Buffalo (LLB)

Louis Spector (April 4, 1918 – January 4, 2003) was an attorney with the U.S. Army Corps of Engineers, and later served as a judge of the United States Court of Federal Claims from 1982 to 1983.

Born in Niagara Falls, New York, Spector attended Niagara University, and received a Bachelor of Laws from the University of Buffalo Law School in 1940. He entered private practice in Buffalo, New York, from 1941 to 1942, and then served in the United States Army during World War II. He did not serve overseas, but was assistant chief of the Legal Branch, U.S. Army Corps of Engineers in Buffalo from 1942 to 1943, and then affiliated with the Atomic Bomb Project in Oak Ridge, Tennessee, from 1943 to 1945.

Spector remained with the Army Corps of Engineers after the war, serving as chief of the Claims, Appeals, and Litigation Section in Chicago, Illinois from 1945 to 1946, and then a chief of the Legal Branch and Real Estate Division in Buffalo from 1946 to 1953. He was executive director of the Port Authority of Buffalo from 1953 to 1954 before becoming a member of the Board of Contract Appeals for the Army Corps of Engineers from 1954 to 1959, then Chairman of the United States Army Panel for the Armed Services Board of Contract Appeals from 1959 to 1962, and finally first chairman of the Unified Armed Services Board of Contract Appeals from 1962 to 1968.

In 1982, Spector became a trial judge of the U.S. Court of Claims, serving in that capacity until October 1, 1982, when he was appointed by operation of law to a new seat on the United States Court of Federal Claims authorized by the Federal Courts Improvement Act, 96 Stat. 27. Spector assumed senior status on May 31, 1983, and resigned from the bench entirely on January 4, 1985. He died in Falls Church, Virginia.
