= James Wesley Hendrix =

American judge (born 1977)

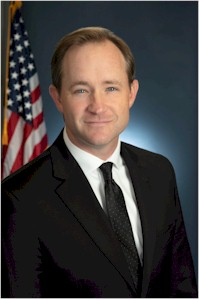

Judge of the United States District Court for the Northern District of Texas
- Incumbent
- Assumed office August 8, 2019
- Appointed by: Donald Trump
- Preceded by: Samuel Ray Cummings

Personal details
- Born: 1977 (age 47–48); Lubbock, Texas, U.S.
- Education: University of Chicago (BA); University of Texas at Austin (JD)

James Wesley Hendrix (born 1977) is a United States district judge of the United States District Court for the Northern District of Texas and former assistant United States attorney for the same district. He presides over the Northern District's Lubbock, Abilene, and San Angelo Divisions, which account for 47 of the Northern District's 100 counties, and span an area larger than Pennsylvania.

== Early life and education ==
Hendrix was born in Lubbock, Texas, and graduated from Lubbock High School. He received a Bachelor of Arts, with honors, in 2000 from the University of Chicago, where he was selected as a student marshal and inducted into Phi Beta Kappa. He earned his Juris Doctor, with high honors, in 2003 from the University of Texas School of Law, where he served on the Texas Law Review and was selected as a chancellor.

== Career ==
After graduating from law school, Hendrix began his legal career as a law clerk to Judge Patrick Higginbotham of the United States Court of Appeals for the Fifth Circuit, in which capacity he served from 2003 to 2004.

Between 2004 and 2007, he was an associate at Baker Botts, practicing complex commercial and intellectual-property litigation in state and federal courts. His practice covered a wide range of civil matters, including energy, wage-and-hour, patent, information-technology, real estate, and employment litigation. He represented both plaintiffs and defendants.

In 2007, he began work as an assistant United States attorney for the Northern District of Texas, representing the United States at trial and on appeal. He helped prosecute Hosam Smadi, who was convicted of attempting to use a weapon of mass destruction in a downtown Dallas skyscraper. He also briefed and argued the Dallas City Hall corruption case, where the Fifth Circuit affirmed the bribery, extortion, and money-laundering convictions and sentences of multiple defendants. He argued over 25 appeals at the Fifth and Seventh Circuits, including two en banc arguments, and served as sole counsel in over 350 appeals involving, among other things, terrorism, public corruption, organized crime, child exploitation, violent crime, and financial fraud. He also served on various trial teams—trying cases, briefing and arguing dispositive motions, and handling sentencing hearings. He regularly taught courses at the Department of Justice's National Advocacy Center and served as a CLE instructor.

Hendrix became chief of the appellate division in 2012. As chief, he served as the office's lead appellate litigator and as a member of the senior management team. He regularly coordinated with the Department of Justice's Criminal Division Appellate Section and the Office of the Solicitor General regarding cases appealed to and argued before the U.S. Supreme Court. In 2015, he began serving on the Appellate Chiefs Working Group for the United States Attorney General's Advisory Committee. In 2017, he became Chair of the Appellate Chiefs Working Group and a member of the Attorney General's Advisory Committee.

Hendrix teaches courses about federal sentencing law and policy as an adjunct professor at Texas Tech University School of Law. In 2020, Texas Tech University's School of Law Alumni Association selected Hendrix to receive the Outstanding Service Award.

=== Federal judicial service ===
==== Expired nomination to district court under Obama ====
On March 15, 2016, President Barack Obama nominated Hendrix to serve as a United States district judge of the United States District Court for the Northern District of Texas, to the seat vacated by Judge Jorge Antonio Solis, who retired on May 1, 2016. On September 7, 2016, a hearing before the Senate Judiciary Committee was held on his nomination. His nomination expired on January 3, 2017, with the end of the 114th Congress.

==== Renomination to district court under Trump ====
On January 16, 2019, President Donald Trump announced his intent to renominate Hendrix to serve as a United States district judge for the United States District Court for the Northern District of Texas. On January 17, 2019, his nomination was sent to the Senate. President Trump nominated Hendrix to the seat vacated by Judge Samuel Ray Cummings, who assumed senior status on December 31, 2014. On April 4, 2019, his nomination was reported out of committee by a 22–0 vote. On July 30, 2019, the United States Senate invoked cloture on his nomination by an 85–5 vote. His nomination was confirmed later that day by an 89–1 vote. He received his judicial commission on August 8, 2019.

=== Notable opinions ===
In August 2022, Hendrix enjoined a directive from the U.S. Department of Health and Human Services that required doctors to provide abortions under the Emergency Medical Treatment and Active Labor Act (EMTALA). Hendrix concluded that the HHS’s directive went “well beyond EMTALA’s text, which protects both mothers and unborn children, is silent as to abortion” and does not preempt state law. The Fifth Circuit affirmed Hendrix’s decision and the U.S. Supreme Court declined to reverse the Fifth Circuit’s holding.

Across multiple decisions spanning two years, Hendrix temporarily and subsequently permanently enjoined U.S. Department of Health and Human Services guidance that would have mandated that all staff of the Head Start program receive a COVID-19 vaccination and required near-universal masking of children enrolled in the program. In temporarily enjoining the guidance, Hendrix found that the agency “cannot act without Congressional authorization,” and that the government had failed to comply with the Administrative Procedure Act (APA). HHS subsequently repealed both requirements.

On February 27, 2024, Hendrix found that a rule implemented by House Democrats during the COVID-19 pandemic allowing virtual and proxy votes to count toward a quorum violated the Quorum Clause of the Constitution. This contradicted the opinion of the House Parliamentarian, who had determined that rules allowed members to vote remotely and that their presence counted toward a quorum. In accordance with this ruling, Hendrix imposed an injunction against the implementation of the Pregnant Workers Fairness Act in Texas.

In March 2024, Hendrix struck down a U.S. Department of Transportation rule that would have required that states set declining targets for greenhouse gas emissions from vehicles using the national highway system. In vacating the rule, Hendrix found that the rule was unauthorized and exceed the Department of Transportation’s authority. A federal judge in Kentucky subsequently struck down the rule on similar grounds. The Department of Transportation initially sought appellate review of the decision, but it subsequently dismissed its appeal in 2025, during the second Trump administration.

In June 2021, Hendrix dismissed a lawsuit brought by Planned Parenthood challenging the City of Lubbock’s “sanctuary city for the unborn” ordinance. The ordinance, which banned abortions at the moment of conception, allowed the unborn child’s parents and relatives to sue abortion providers. In dismissing the case, Hendrix concluded that Planned Parenthood did not have standing to pursue its claims, and, therefore, the court did not have jurisdiction to rule on the merits of the case. Planned Parenthood appealed Hendrix’s decision, but it later dropped its challenge.

In December 2022, Hendrix granted a preliminary injunction preventing the U.S. Army from taking action against service members who refused to receive a COVID-19 vaccination on religious grounds. Particularly, Hendrix concluded that the Army’s refusal to make reasonable accommodations for sincerely held religious beliefs violated the Religious Freedom Restoration Act (RFRA). Among other things, Hendrix found that the Army failed to conduct an “individualized” analysis of each objector’s request and that less restrictive means would have been unsuccessful. Congress later required the Army to rescind its COVID-19 vaccination mandate. After Congress’s recission of the mandate, Hendrix denied in part a motion to dismiss the suit because one servicemember’s claim remained live.

== See also ==
- Barack Obama judicial appointment controversies

Legal offices
Preceded by Samuel Ray Cummings	Judge of the United States District Court for the Northern District of Texas; 2019–present	Incumbent
