= Alison Renee Lee =

South Carolina Judge

Alison Lee

Personal details
- Born: 1958 (age 67–68) Washington, D.C., U.S.
- Education: Vassar College (AB); Tulane University (JD)

Alison Renee Lee (born 1958) is a retired South Carolina circuit judge in the Fifth Judicial Circuit and former nominee for United States district judge of the United States District Court for the District of South Carolina.

== Biography ==
Lee was born in 1958 in Washington, D.C. She received a Bachelor of Arts degree in 1979 from Vassar College. She received her Juris Doctor in 1982 from Tulane Law School. She served as a law clerk for Judge Israel M. Augustine, Jr. on the Louisiana Court of Appeals, Fourth Circuit from 1982 to 1983 and as a law clerk for Judge C. Tolbert Goolsby Jr. on the South Carolina Court of Appeals from 1983 to 1984. From 1984 to 1989, she practiced civil litigation with the McNair Law Firm. From 1989 to 1994, she worked as a staff counsel for the South Carolina legislative counsel. From 1994 to 1999, she served as an administrative law judge in South Carolina. From 1999 to 2023, she served as a circuit judge in South Carolina's Fifth Judicial Circuit. In that role, she presided over both criminal and civil trials and handled appeals in municipal, magistrate and zoning cases. Lee retired from active status on May 16, 2023.

=== Failed nomination to federal district court ===
On June 26, 2013, President Barack Obama nominated Lee to serve as a United States district judge of the United States District Court for the District of South Carolina, to the seat being vacated by Judge Cameron McGowan Currie, who took senior status on October 3, 2013.

Senators Lindsey Graham and Tim Scott opposed her nomination because of a controversial decision she made involving burglary suspect Lorenzo Young. Lee consolidated bonds and reduced the total from $225,000 to $175,000 for Young, who subsequently was released and then later charged in the July 1 slaying of a 33-year-old woman.

Due to opposition from her home state senators and a no opportunity of receiving a hearing, President Obama withdrew her nomination on September 18, 2014.

=== Failed run for state court of appeals ===
On February 6, 2019 Lee was defeated in the race for a seat on the South Carolina Court of Appeals by Blake Hewitt, in a vote by the South Carolina Legislature. Her loss prompted a walkout by approximately 20 Black members of the house and senate, in protest over the confirmation of a white lawyer with no judicial experience over a black judge with over 20 years on the bench. It was her sixth bid for a seat on the Court of Appeals.

== See also ==
- Barack Obama judicial appointment controversies
- List of African-American jurists
