= Phillip Baldwin =

American judge (1924–2002)

Phillip Benjamin Baldwin
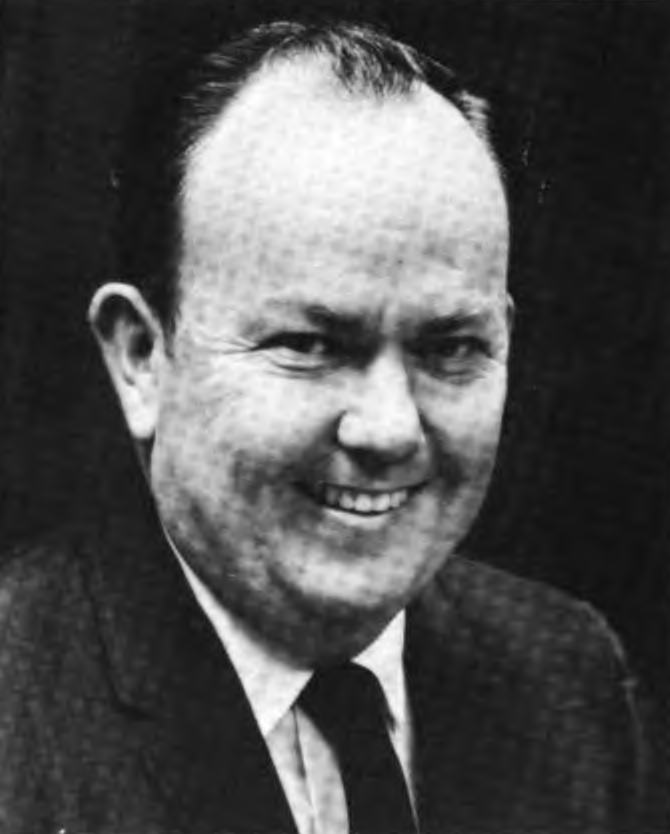

Senior Judge of the United States Court of Appeals for the Federal Circuit
- In office November 24, 1986 – April 8, 1991

Judge of the United States Court of Appeals for the Federal Circuit
- In office October 1, 1982 – November 24, 1986
- Appointed by: operation of law
- Preceded by: Seat established by 96 Stat. 25
- Succeeded by: Paul Redmond Michel

Associate Judge of the United States Court of Customs and Patent Appeals
- In office July 25, 1968 – October 1, 1982
- Appointed by: Lyndon B. Johnson
- Preceded by: Isaac Jack Martin
- Succeeded by: Seat abolished

Personal details
- Born: Phillip Benjamin Baldwin; December 23, 1924 Marshall, Texas, U.S.
- Died: April 20, 2002 (aged 77) Shreveport, Louisiana, U.S.
- Education: University of North Texas (BA); Baylor Law School; South Texas College of Law

Phillip Benjamin Baldwin (December 23, 1924 – April 20, 2002) was a Senior Judge of the United States Court of Appeals for the Federal Circuit and previously was an Associate Judge of the United States Court of Customs and Patent Appeals.

== Education and career ==
Baldwin was born in Marshall, Texas, the son of Lucile Jones Baldwin and John Browning Baldwin, M.D., and brother of John Browning "Jack" Baldwin, Jr., Mary Jane Baldwin Sanders and Francis Scott "Scotty" Baldwin, Sr. He was the great-grandson of William Fitzpatrick Baldwin, M.D., after whom the community of Baldwin, Texas was named in 1845. Baldwin was a United States Army Air Corps pilot from 1943 to 1946, flying B-25 Mitchells in the South West Pacific theatre of World War II on low-level bombing raids. His unit was the 405th Flight Squadron, 38th Bombardment Group, of the Fifth Air Force. He earned the Asiatic-Pacific Campaign Medal with six bronze service stars (Luzon, Western Pacific, New Guinea, Borneo, China Sea offensive, and the air offensive of Japan). He was also decorated with the American Campaign Medal and by the Philippine Government with the Philippine Liberation Medal. Baldwin later went on to pursue his undergraduate degree at North Texas State University, receiving a Bachelor of Arts degree in 1949. He studied at Baylor Law School before graduating from the South Texas College of Law Houston. He went into private practice in his hometown of Marshall and then moved on to public service a year later, serving as Assistant District Attorney for Harrison County, Texas and later District Attorney. In 1959, he returned to private practice in Marshall with his brother, Scotty Baldwin, and remained there until his appointment to the federal bench in 1968. Following his retirement from the federal judiciary in 1991, he joined California-based JAMS Mediation, Arbitration and ADR Services as an arbitrator and special master handling intellectual property disputes in Dallas, Houston and New York.

== Federal judicial service ==
Baldwin was nominated by President Lyndon B. Johnson on May 29, 1968, to a seat on the United States Court of Customs and Patent Appeals vacated by Judge Isaac Jack Martin. He was confirmed by the United States Senate on July 25, 1968, and received his commission on July 25, 1968. He was reassigned by operation of law on October 1, 1982, to the United States Court of Appeals for the Federal Circuit, to a new seat authorized by 96 Stat. 25. He assumed senior status due to a certified disability on November 24, 1986. His service terminated on April 8, 1991, due to his retirement. He died in Shreveport, Louisiana on April 20, 2002. His chamber papers and personal records were donated to South Texas College of Law Houston in 2005.

== Notable case ==
Baldwin was the author of In re Moore (444 F. 2d 572, 170 U.S.P.Q. (BNA) 260 (Fed. Cir. 1987)), a patent law case establishing the logical asymmetry of the "prior invention" standard between patent interference claims and Rule 131 affidavits.

== Personal life ==
Baldwin was married to Mertie Bellamy Baldwin for 54 years. He had four children, Rebecca Baldwin Clark, Jane Baldwin Chrisenberry, Phillip Baldwin, Jr., and Nancy Baldwin Rohtert.

Legal offices
Preceded by Isaac Jack Martin	Associate Judge of the United States Court of Customs and Patent Appeals; 1968–1982	Succeeded by Seat abolished
Preceded by Seat established by 96 Stat. 25	Judge of the United States Court of Appeals for the Federal Circuit; 1982–1991	Succeeded by Paul Redmond Michel
