= Eleven West =

Building in Portland, Oregon, U.S.

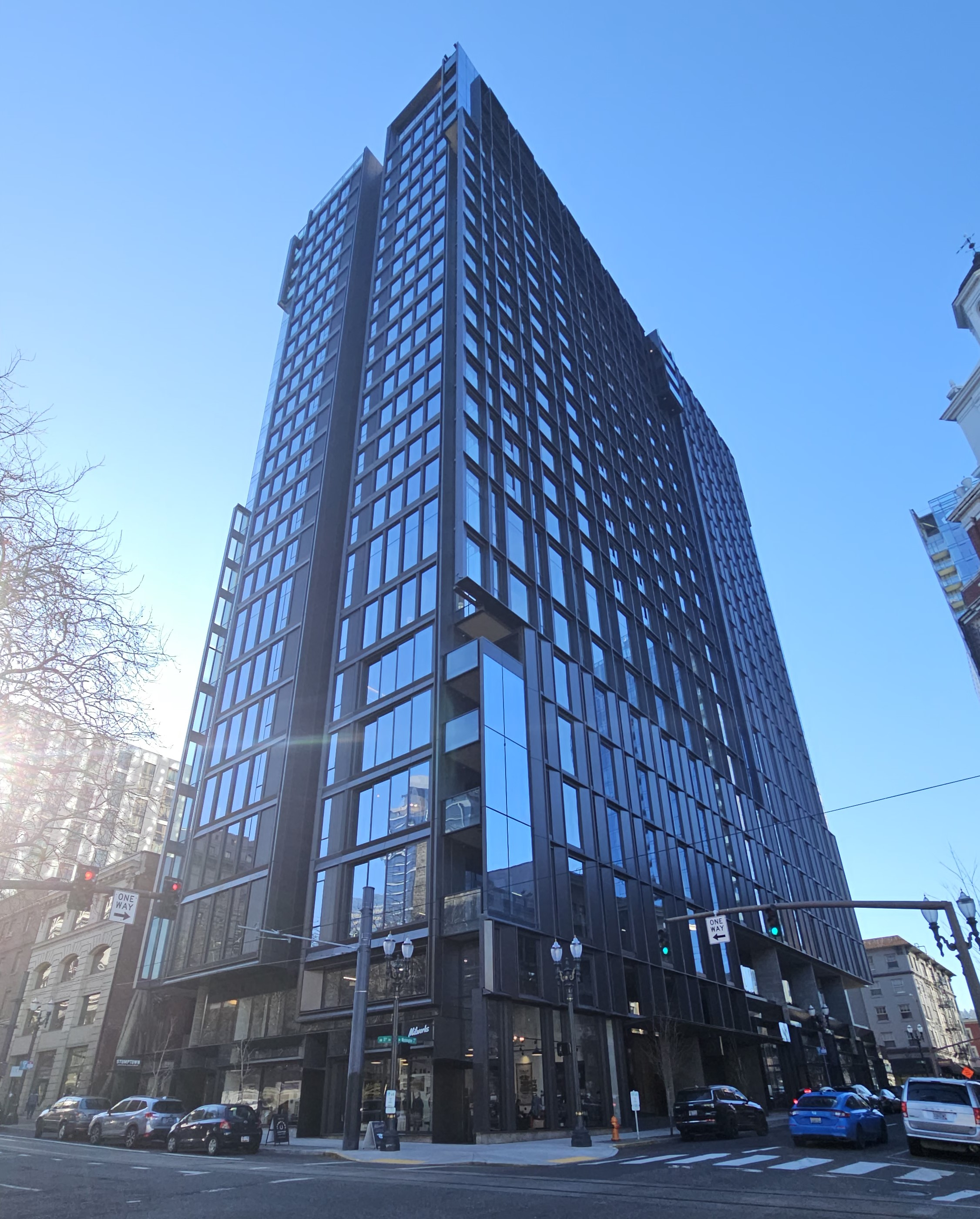
- Interactive map of the Eleven West area

General information
- Status: Completed
- Location: Portland, Oregon, United States
- Coordinates: 45.521504°N 122.682841°W
- Current tenants: Panic; Miller Nash
- Construction stopped: 2023
- Completed: March 2023

Height
- Height: 300-foot (91 m)

Technical details
- Floor count: 24

Design and construction
- Architecture firm: ZGF Architects
- Main contractor: Turner Construction

Eleven West is a 24-story building in Portland, Oregon, United States. Designed by architectural firm, ZGF Architects, and structural engineering firm, KPFF, and built by Turner Construction, the building opened in March 2023. The 300-foot (91 m) tall building features 107,000 square feet (9,900 m^{2}) of office space, 213 apartments, retail on the street level, and underground parking. Tenants include, JGP Wealth Management, a Stumptown Coffee Roasters cafe, software company Panic, and the law firm Miller Nash, amongst others.

== History ==
Planning for a building at the location to replace a parking lot by developer Gerding Edlen started as early as 2010. More concrete plans for a 24-story tower on the west end of Portland's downtown were announced by developer Greg Goodman in 2017. Construction on the project began in 2020. The first lease for space in the building was with Orrick, Herrington & Sutcliffe, a law firm. Construction on the building finished in March 2023. In November 2023, the general contractor Turner Construction filed a lien on the property. Stumptown Coffee Roasters opened a cafe on the ground floor of 11W in April 2024. 11 West sits kitty corner across SW Washington Street from Twelve West, which was developed by the same developer and designed by the same architecture firm.

== Details ==
The mixed-use 300 foot tall building has 24 floors, plus four floors of underground parking. There is about 8,000 square feet (740 m^{2}) of commercial space on the ground floor, with 107,000 square feet (9,900 m^{2}) of office space overall, plus 213 apartments. The apartments have access to an outdoor pool the eighth floor, and a rooftop balcony.

== See also ==
- List of tallest buildings in Portland, Oregon
