= Arvo Mikkanen =

Assistant United States Attorney in Oklahoma, United States

Arvo Quoetone Mikkanen

Assistant United States Attorney
- Incumbent
- Assumed office 1994
- Appointed by: Bill Clinton

Personal details
- Born: Arvo Quoetone Mikkanen; April 1961 (age 64–65) Denver, Colorado, U.S.
- Education: Dartmouth College (BA); Yale University (JD)

Arvo Quoetone Mikkanen (born April 1961) is an Assistant United States Attorney in the Office of the United States Attorney for the Western District of Oklahoma and a former federal judicial nominee for the United States District Court for the Northern District of Oklahoma. He has been a judicial law clerk, civil practitioner, judge, tribal prosecutor, law professor, and federal criminal prosecutor during his legal career which began in 1986. Mikkanen is a lecturer and frequent instructor in federal criminal investigations, prosecution issues and Indian affairs law. From 1991 to 1994, he served as chief justice of the Supreme Court of the Cheyenne and Arapaho Tribes.

== Early life and education ==
Mikkanen is an enrolled member of the Kiowa Tribe of Oklahoma, a federally recognized Indian tribe, and is also of Comanche and Finnish descent. He received an A.B. magna cum laude from Dartmouth College in 1983, graduating Phi Beta Kappa. He received the William S. Churchill prize as the outstanding freshman at Dartmouth College for the Class of 1983 and received the Morrell Goldberg Prize for academic service several years later. He was also the recipient of the Gold United States Congressional Award from the U.S. Congress in 1985. He received a J.D. from Yale Law School in 1986, and was the Class Marshal for the Class of 1986 at the Yale Law School and while at Yale received the Beinecke Award in 1986. After graduating law school, Mikkanen served as a law clerk for Judge Lawrence S. Margolis of the United States Claims Court, and followed that with a clerkship for Judge Robert M. Parker of the United States District Court for the Eastern District of Texas.

== Legal experience ==
Mikkanen has been a federal prosecutor since 1994 and has prosecuted cases involving violent crimes, physical and sexual assaults, homicides, firearms offenses, immigration offenses, wildlife violations, embezzlement, drug offenses, government corruption, as well a civil cases involving administrative law, foreclosures, and government regulations. As of 2022, he had been counsel of record in over 750 cases in the U.S. District Court for the Western District of Oklahoma, having handled numerous civil cases, juvenile delinquency adjudications, and criminal prosecutions, including bench and jury trials, as well as oral arguments before the U.S. Court of Appeals for the 10th Circuit.

Prior to joining the U.S. Attorney's Office, Mikkanen was an associate attorney and litigator with the Andrews Davis law firm in Oklahoma City from 1988 to 1994 where he engaged in business practice, products liability defense, trademark law, real estate law, insurance defense, and commercial litigation in state and federal courts. He is a member of the Oklahoma Bar Association, having resided in Norman, Oklahoma since 1988.

== Judicial experience ==
Mikkanen served as a judge of the Court of Indian Offenses for the Anadarko Area Tribes from 1988 to 1994, a federally administered tribal court which is part of the United States Department of the Interior. He also served as chief justice of the Supreme Court of the Cheyenne and Arapaho Tribes from 1991 to 1994. He published numerous opinions during his period of service as a judge.

== Awards, honors, and teaching activities ==
Mikkanen received the Oklahoma Bar Association's Outstanding Pro Bono Service Award in 1992, and the Equal Access to Justice - Pro Bono Publico Award from Oklahoma Indian Legal Services in 1992. He was the recipient of the American Bar Association's Spirit of Excellence Award in 2004 and received the Sonja Atetewuthtakewa Award for Distinguished Service in the Protection of Native American Children in 2003. He also served as an adjunct professor of law at the Oklahoma City University School of Law from 1988 to 2000. In 2011 he was presented the 2011 Exceptional Service Award from the National Association of Former United States Attorneys. In 2012 Mikkanen received the Attorney General's Award for Exceptional Service in Indian Country during the 60th Annual Attorney General's Awards Ceremony which recognizes both department employees and others for their outstanding dedication to carrying out the U.S. Department of Justice's missions. The Attorney General's Award for Exceptional Service in Indian Country recognizes extraordinary efforts by department employees that demonstrate a commitment to fight crime in Indian Country. Mikkanen received the award in recognition of his exceptional and long-standing efforts to enhance law enforcement response to crime. He has been an instructor for the Bureau of Indian Affairs' Criminal Justice in Indian Country Training over twenty times and instructed on this topic as part of the Oklahoma Highway Patrol's Police Academy repeatedly. Mikkanen has received recognition for meritorious service from the Federal Bureau of Investigation ("FBI") and a Certificate of Appreciation from the Bureau of Alcohol, Tobacco, Firearms & Explosives ("ATF") for contributions in the prosecution of federal crimes. He served as the president of the Oklahoma Indian Bar Association ("OIBA") for over 30 years.

== Federal judicial nomination ==
Mikkanen was a federal judicial nominee for more than 10 months in 2011, but his nomination immediately encountered opposition from Oklahoma's congressional delegation. The nomination languished without a hearing before the United States Senate Committee on the Judiciary, and the White House ultimately nominated another candidate for that judgeship. Mikkanen was recommended for the judgeship on the United States District Court for the Northern District of Oklahoma by Democratic Governor Brad Henry. On February 2, 2011, President Barack Obama formally nominated Mikkanen to a seat on the Northern District of Oklahoma that had been vacated by Judge Terence C. Kern, who had taken senior status in January 2010. Mikkanen's nomination was immediately met with opposition from members of Oklahoma's congressional delegation, with Republican Senators Jim Inhofe and Tom Coburn and Democratic Representative Dan Boren expressing disappointment that they were not consulted on the nomination. However, an official in Obama White House speaking off the record disputed that they did consult with the Oklahoma congressional delegation. Public opposition to Mikkanen's nomination has centered around procedural grounds rather than substantive issues about Mikkanen himself.

Had he been confirmed, Mikkanen would have been only the third Native American ever to serve on the federal bench, after Frank Howell Seay and Michael Burrage. His nomination was returned to the President on December 17, 2011, pursuant to the rules of the Senate, and Obama did not renominate Mikkanen to the judgeship. In February 2012, Obama nominated John E. Dowdell to fill the vacancy, and the Senate confirmed Dowdell to the seat in December 2012.

== See also ==
- Barack Obama judicial appointment controversies
- List of Native American jurists
