= Suzanne Mitchell =

American judge

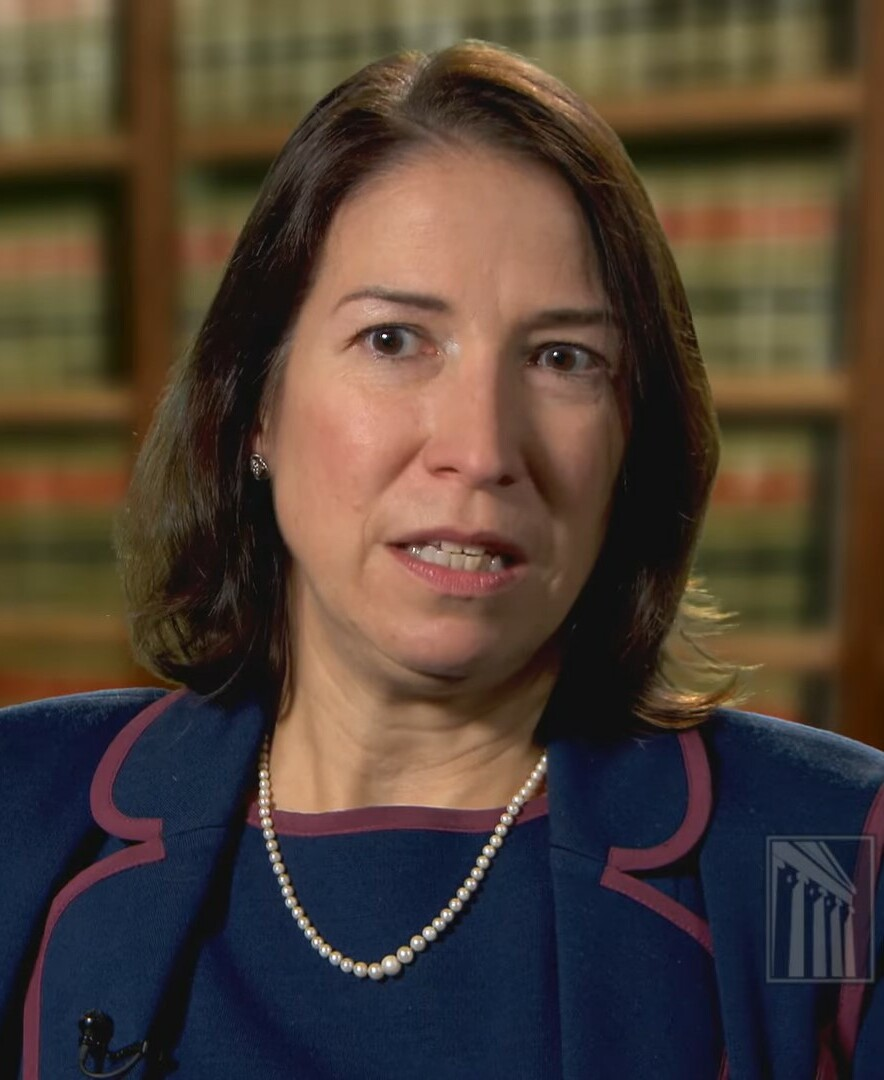
- Mitchell in 2019

Magistrate Judge of the United States District Court for the Western District of Oklahoma
- Incumbent
- Assumed office February 1, 2013

Personal details
- Born: 1968 (age 57–58) Bronxville, New York, U.S.
- Education: Georgetown University (BSFS); George Washington University (JD)

Suzanne Mitchell (born 1968) is a United States magistrate judge for the Western District of Oklahoma and is a former nominee to be a United States district judge of the United States District Court for the Western District of Oklahoma.

== Biography ==
Mitchell received a Bachelor of Science in Foreign Service degree in 1990 from Georgetown University. She received a Juris Doctor, magna cum laude, in 1996 from the George Washington University Law School, graduating Order of the Coif. She served as a law clerk to Judge Robert Harlan Henry of the United States Court of Appeals for the Tenth Circuit and later served as a senior law clerk to Judge Henry, from 1999 to 2010. From 1997 to 1999, she was a transactional attorney for an Oklahoma city based law firm. She served as an Assistant United States Attorney in the Appellate Division of the United States Attorney's Office for the Western District of Oklahoma, from 2010 to 2013. Since 2013, she has served as a United States magistrate judge in the Western District of Oklahoma.

== Expired nomination to district court ==
On December 16, 2015, President Barack Obama nominated Mitchell to serve as a United States District Judge of the United States District Court for the Western District of Oklahoma, to the seat vacated by Judge David Lynn Russell, who took senior status on July 7, 2013. She received a hearing before the United States Senate Judiciary Committee on April 20, 2016. On May 19, 2016, her nomination was reported out of committee by voice vote. Her nomination expired on January 3, 2017, with the end of the 114th Congress.

== Personal life ==
She is married to Samuel R. Fulkerson, a managing shareholder at Ogletree Deakins law firm, and resides in Oklahoma City, Oklahoma. They have four children.

She is serving as the 2024-2025 President of the Oklahoma City Rotary Club.
