= Richard G. Taranto =

American judge (born 1957)

Richard Taranto
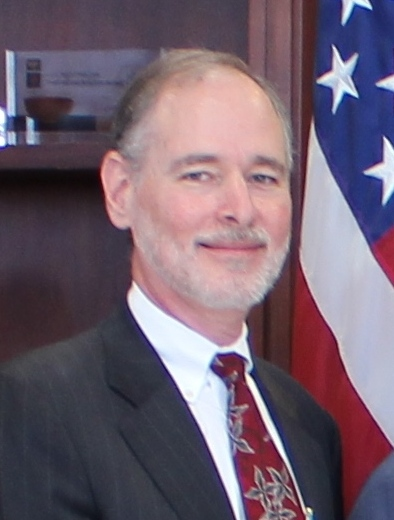
- Taranto in 2013

Judge of the United States Court of Appeals for the Federal Circuit
- Incumbent
- Assumed office March 12, 2013
- Appointed by: Barack Obama
- Preceded by: Paul Redmond Michel

Personal details
- Born: Richard Gary Taranto; May 6, 1957 (age 69) New York City, New York, U.S.
- Education: Pomona College (BA); University of Wisconsin, Madison (attended); Yale University (JD)

Richard Gary Taranto (born May 6, 1957) is a United States circuit judge of the United States Court of Appeals for the Federal Circuit.

== Biography ==
Taranto was born in New York City on May 6, 1957. He received a Bachelor of Arts degree, summa cum laude, in 1977 from Pomona College in Claremont, California. He spent a semester each at Yale University and then the University of Wisconsin–Madison in their Ph.D. programs in Mathematics. He then received his Juris Doctor from Yale Law School in 1981. While in law school he served as an article and book editor for the Yale Law Journal. Upon completion of law school, he clerked for Judge Abraham David Sofaer of the United States District Court for the Southern District of New York from 1981 to 1982. From 1982 to 1983, he clerked for Judge Robert Bork of the United States Court of Appeals for the District of Columbia Circuit. He then clerked for Justice Sandra Day O'Connor of the United States Supreme Court. From 1984 to 1986, Taranto worked at the law firm of Onek, Klein & Farr in Washington, D.C. From 1986 to 1989 he spent three years as an assistant to the Solicitor General. In 1989, he returned to Onek, Klein & Farr (later named Farr & Taranto) as a partner.

Taranto has taught a course on patent law at Harvard Law School and various courses at Georgetown University Law Center. Since 2009, he has served as a member of the appellate rules advisory committee for the United States Judicial Conference. He has argued nineteen cases before the United States Supreme Court.

== Federal judicial service ==
On November 10, 2011, President Obama nominated Taranto to serve as a United States circuit judge of the United States Court of Appeals for the Federal Circuit to replace Paul Redmond Michel, who retired in 2010. The previous nominee for this position, Edward C. DuMont, withdrew after his nomination languished in the Senate for eighteen months without action. On January 2, 2013, Taranto's nomination was returned to the President, due to the sine die adjournment of the Senate.

On January 3, 2013, Taranto was re-nominated to the same office. On February 7, 2013, the Senate Judiciary Committee reported his nomination to the floor by voice vote. On March 11, 2013, the Senate confirmed him by a 91–0 vote. He received his commission on March 12, 2013, and assumed office on March 15, 2013.

== See also ==
- List of law clerks for the eighth seat of the Supreme Court of the United States

Legal offices
Preceded by Paul Redmond Michel	Judge of the United States Court of Appeals for the Federal Circuit; 2013–present	Incumbent
