= Moody R. Tidwell III =

American judge (1939–2026)

Moody Tidwell
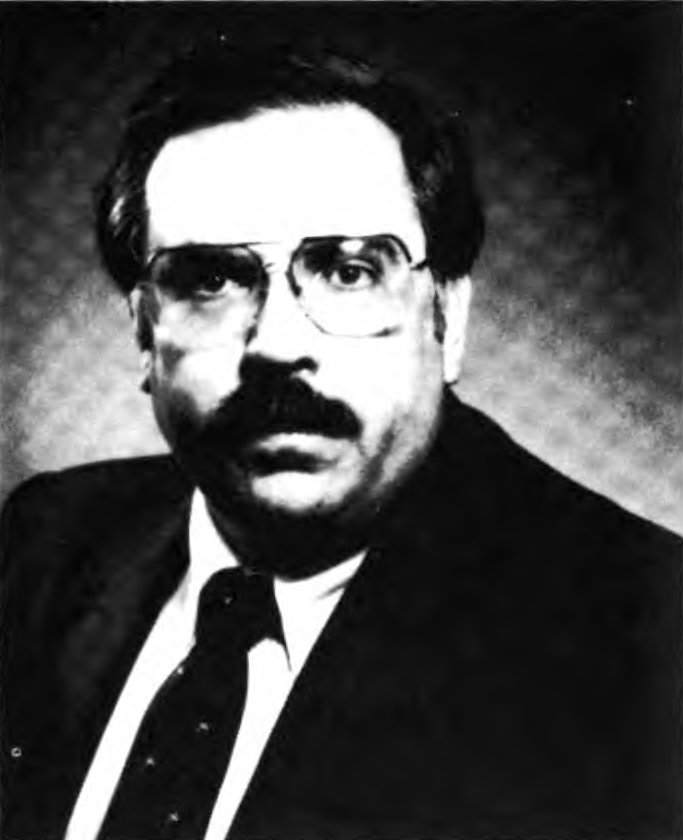

Senior Judge of the United States Court of Federal Claims
- In office May 16, 1998 – April 2, 2026

Judge of the United States Court of Federal Claims
- In office May 17, 1983 – May 16, 1998
- Appointed by: Ronald Reagan
- Preceded by: Louis Spector
- Succeeded by: Nancy B. Firestone

Personal details
- Born: Moody Rudolph Tidwell III; February 15, 1939 Kansas City, Missouri, U.S.
- Died: April 2, 2026 (aged 87)
- Spouse: Serena Cox
- Children: 2
- Education: Ohio Wesleyan University (BA); American University (JD); George Washington University (LLM)

Military service
- Branch/service: United States Coast Guard
- Years of service: 1962–1966

Moody Rudolph Tidwell III (February 15, 1939 – April 2, 2026) was an American judge of the United States Court of Federal Claims.

== Early life, education, and career ==
Born in Kansas City, Missouri, Tidwell's father, Moody R. Tidwell Jr., was an officer in the United States Air Force Judge Advocate General's Corps, who eventually became a Major General in that branch. Tidwell received a Bachelor of Arts from Ohio Wesleyan University in 1961 and served in the U.S. Coast Guard from 1962 to 1966. He received a Juris Doctor from American University, Washington College of Law, in 1965. He was an attorney in the Office of the General Counsel for the U.S. Government Accounting Office from 1965 to 1969.

Tidwell then held a series of positions within the United States Department of the Interior, first as a staff attorney from 1969 to 1971, then as an assistant solicitor for procurement until 1974, associate solicitor for general law until 1976, and associate solicitor for energy and resources until 1977. During this time, Tidwell received a Master of Laws degree from the George Washington University Law School in 1974.

Tidwell was an associate solicitor for mine safety and health in the U.S. Department of Labor from 1977 to 1980, and was then deputy solicitor and counselor to the United States Secretary of the Interior from 1980 to 1983. Tidwell also served as corporate secretary and as a board member for KECO Industries, Inc., from 1979 to 1982.

=== Claims court service ===
On March 30, 1983, Tidwell was nominated by President Ronald Reagan to a seat on the United States Claims Court vacated by Judge Louis Spector. Confirmed by the Senate on May 16, 1983, Tidwell received his commission the following day. He assumed senior status on May 16, 1998, and served in that capacity until his death.

== Personal life and death ==
Tidwell and his wife Rena had two sons, Gregory T. Tidwell and Jeremy H. Tidwell.

Tidwell died of natural causes at the age of 87 on April 2, 2026.

Legal offices
Preceded by Louis Spector	Judge of the United States Court of Federal Claims; 1983–1998	Succeeded by Nancy B. Firestone
