= Nancy B. Firestone =

American judge (1951–2022)

Nancy Firestone
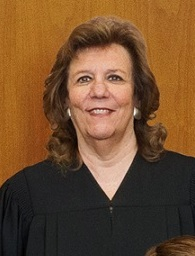
- Firestone in 2017

Senior Judge of the United States Court of Federal Claims
- In office October 22, 2013 – October 3, 2022

Judge of the United States Court of Federal Claims
- In office October 22, 1998 – October 22, 2013
- Appointed by: Bill Clinton
- Preceded by: Moody R. Tidwell III
- Succeeded by: Ryan T. Holte

Personal details
- Born: October 17, 1951 Manchester, New Hampshire, U.S.
- Died: October 3, 2022 (aged 70) Washington, D.C., U.S.
- Spouse: Patricia Payne
- Children: 1
- Education: Washington University in St. Louis (BA); University of Missouri, Kansas City (JD)

Nancy Beth Firestone (October 17, 1951 – October 3, 2022) was a judge of the United States Court of Federal Claims, appointed to that court in 1998 by President Bill Clinton.

== Early life, education, and career ==
Born in Manchester, New Hampshire, Firestone received a Bachelor of Arts from Washington University in St. Louis in 1973 and a Juris Doctor from the University of Missouri–Kansas City School of Law in 1977. Firestone served in various capacities as an attorney with the United States Department of Justice from 1977 to 1989. She was the associate deputy administrator of the Environmental Protection Agency from 1989 to 1992, and a judge on that agency's environmental appeals board from 1992 to 1995, when she returned to the Justice Department as deputy assistant attorney general in the Environment and Natural Resources division. Firestone was also an adjunct professor at the Georgetown University Law Center.

=== Claims court service ===
On October 22, 1998, Firestone was appointed judge of the United States Court of Federal Claims by President Bill Clinton. On October 22, 2013, Nancy Firestone retired from active service on the United States Court of Federal Claims, effectively assuming senior status in that capacity. On April 10, 2014, President Barack Obama nominated Firestone to a serve a second 15-year term. She received a hearing on her re-nomination before the United States Senate Judiciary Committee for June 4, 2014. On June 19, 2014, her nomination was reported out of committee by voice vote.

On December 16, 2014, her nomination was returned to the President due to the sine die adjournment of the 113th Congress. On January 7, 2015, President Obama renominated her to the same position. On February 26, 2015, her nomination was reported out of committee by voice vote. Her nomination expired with the end of the 114th Congress on January 3, 2017. She died on October 3, 2022, at the age of 70.

Legal offices
Preceded by Moody R. Tidwell III	Judge of the United States Court of Federal Claims; 1998–2013	Succeeded by Ryan T. Holte
