= Elizabeth A. Copeland =

American judge (born 1964)

Elizabeth Copeland
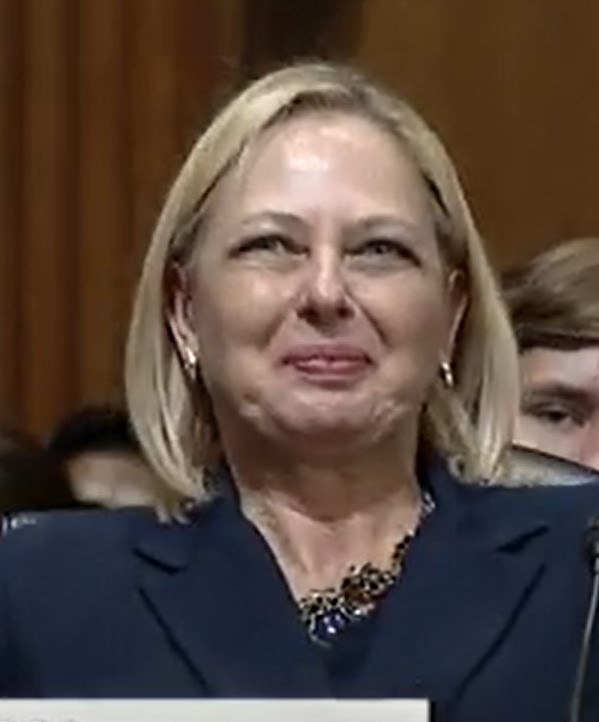
- Copeland in 2018

Judge of the United States Tax Court
- Incumbent
- Assumed office October 12, 2018
- Appointed by: Donald Trump
- Preceded by: James Halpern

Personal details
- Born: June 1, 1964 (age 61) Colorado Springs, Colorado, U.S.
- Education: University of Texas, Austin (BBA, JD)

Elizabeth Ann Copeland (born June 1, 1964) is an American lawyer who serves as a judge of the United States Tax Court.

== Biography ==
Copeland was born on June 1, 1964, in Colorado Springs, Colorado. She received a Bachelor of Business Administration degree, cum laude, in 1986 from the University of Texas at Austin. Prior to attending law school, she worked at Ernst & Whinney (now Ernst & Young) from 1986 to 1989. Copeland received a Juris Doctor in 1992 from the University of Texas School of Law. While attending law school, she served as a law clerk to Justice Eugene A. Cook of the Supreme Court of Texas. She began her legal career as an attorney adviser to Judge Mary Ann Cohen of the United States Tax Court, from 1992 to 1993. From 1993 to 2012, she practiced law with the firm of Oppenheimer, Blend, Harrison & Tate, Inc., becoming a shareholder in 2000. She practiced law with the firm of Strasburger & Price, LLP, in San Antonio, Texas, from 2012 to 2018, when she became a judge. She handled all matters pertaining to federal income taxation, including planning and tax controversies, and also dealt with the Internal Revenue Service at the administrative appeals level and in litigation.

=== Recognition and certifications ===
Copeland has been board certified in tax law by the Texas Board of Legal Specialization since 2002. Tax Analysts named her a 2012 Tax Person of the Year in its national edition of Tax Notes. She served as chair of the State Bar of Texas Tax Section in 2013 to 2014 and is a Certified Public Accountant.

== United States Tax Court service ==
=== Expired nomination under Obama ===
On May 4, 2015, President Barack Obama nominated Copeland to serve as a Judge of the United States Tax Court, to the seat vacated by Judge Diane Kroupa, who retired on June 16, 2014. She received a hearing before the United States Senate Committee on Finance on January 29, 2016. On April 18, 2016, her nomination was reported out of committee by a 26–0 vote. Her nomination expired on January 3, 2017, with the end of the 114th Congress.

=== Renomination to tax court under Trump ===
On August 3, 2017, President Donald Trump nominated Copeland to serve as a Judge of the United States Tax Court, to the seat vacated by Judge James Halpern, who retired on October 16, 2015. The Senate Finance Committee held a hearing on her nomination on June 12, 2018, and then voted out her nomination unanimously on June 28, 2018. On August 28, 2018, her nomination was confirmed by voice vote. She took office on October 12, 2018.

Legal offices
Preceded by James Halpern	Judge of the United States Tax Court; 2018–present	Incumbent
