= Ryan T. Holte =

American judge (born 1983)

Ryan Holte
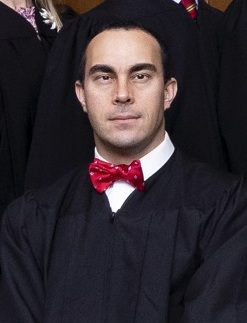
- Holte in 2022

Judge of the United States Court of Federal Claims
- Incumbent
- Assumed office July 11, 2019
- Appointed by: Donald Trump
- Preceded by: Nancy B. Firestone

Personal details
- Born: Ryan Thomas Holte; October 3, 1983 (age 42) Napa, California, U.S.
- Education: California Polytechnic State University, Maritime (BS); University of California, Davis (JD)

Ryan Thomas Holte (born October 3, 1983) is a judge of the United States Court of Federal Claims.

== Biography ==
Holte graduated from Jesuit High School in Sacramento, California. Holte received his Bachelor of Engineering, magna cum laude, from the California State University Maritime Academy. He earned his Juris Doctor from the UC Davis School of Law, where he served as a staff editor of the UC Davis Business Law Journal.

Upon graduating from law school, Holte was a law clerk to Judge Loren A. Smith of the United States Court of Federal Claims and Judge Stanley F. Birch Jr. of the United States Court of Appeals for the Eleventh Circuit.

Before joining the law faculty at Akron, he served for four years on the faculty at Southern Illinois University School of Law, worked as a trial attorney at the United States Federal Trade Commission, and practiced law as an associate at Jones Day. From 2017 to 2019 he served as the David L. Brennan Associate Professor of Law and the director of the Center for Intellectual Property Law and Technology at the University of Akron School of Law. He taught and researched in the areas of property and intellectual property law and is a recognized expert in these areas, completing numerous academic research fellowships and funded research grants. He also served as general counsel, partner, and co-inventor of an electrical engineering technology company.

Holte is a co-inventor of U.S. Patent Numbers 9,523,773; 10,338,226; 10,564,286; 11,067,696; and 11,762,099; all titled "System and methods for countering satellite-navigated munitions."

=== Court of Federal Claims service ===
On September 28, 2017, President Donald Trump nominated Holte to serve as a judge of the United States Court of Federal Claims for a term of 15 years, to the seat vacated by Judge Nancy B. Firestone, who assumed senior status on October 22, 2013. On February 14, 2018, a hearing on his nomination was held before the Senate Judiciary Committee On March 15, 2018, his nomination was reported out of committee by a 14–7 vote. On January 3, 2019, his nomination was returned to the President under Rule XXXI, Paragraph 6 of the United States Senate. On January 23, 2019, President Trump announced his intent to renominate Holte for a federal judgeship. His nomination was sent to the Senate later that day. On February 7, 2019, his nomination was reported out of committee by a 15–7 vote.

On June 5, 2019, the Senate invoked cloture on his nomination by a 60–33 vote. On June 10, 2019, his nomination was confirmed by a 60–35 vote. He received his judicial commission on July 11, 2019. He took the oath of office on July 26, 2019.

=== Notable opinions ===
In Campo v. United States, 157 Fed. Cl. 584 (2021), Holte referred to John Locke's 1690 Second Treatise of Government, where Locke wrote "the labour of his body, and the work of his hands, we may say, are properly his. Whatsoever then he removes out of the state that nature hath provided, and left it in, he hath mixed his labour with, and joined to it something that is his own, and thereby makes it his property." Relying on these principles of labor theory, as well as Louisiana precedent and federal common law, Holte held that Louisiana oyster growers may claim property rights in the fruits of their labor—oysters.

In Giesecke & Devrient GmbH v. United States, 150 Fed. Cl. 330 (2020), Holte evaluated whether the Court of Federal Claims has jurisdiction to award attorneys' fees pursuant to 35 U.S.C. § 285. In doing so, Holte remarked that "[a] limited judiciary is central to our system of governance." Quoting Elihu Root's The Importance of an Independent Judiciary, 72 Independent 704, 704 (1912), Holte continued: "The judge is always confined within the narrow limits of reasonable interpretation. It is not his function or within his power to enlarge or improve or change the law. . . . By virtue of the special duty imposed upon them, our courts are excluded from playing the part of reformers." And reviewing Federalist No. 78 to explain the limitations imposed on courts by the Constitution of the United States, Holte emphasized that Alexander Hamilton recognized at the Founding that the courts are "bound down by strict rules and precedents, which serve to define and point out their duty in every particular case that comes before them." Holte was later affirmed by the U.S. Court of Appeals for the Federal Circuit on other grounds.

In a patent case, E-Numerate Sols., Inc. v. United States, 170 Fed. Cl. 147 (2024), Holte issued one of his many claim construction opinions since joining the Court. There, Holte issued a 56-page opinion construing 18 patent claim terms related to computer code.

Holte's notable cases span other subject matter as well. For example, in the tax dispute Actavis Labs., FL, Inc. v. United States, 161 Fed. Cl. 334 (2022), Holte determined Hatch-Waxman patent infringement litigation defense expenses are tax deductible under both the Supreme Court's Origin of the Claim Test and Treasury Regulation § 1.263(a)-4. Holte's decision was discussed by the U.S. Court of Appeals for the Third Circuit in its precedential opinion reaching the same conclusion in Mylan Inc & Subsidiaries v. Comm'r of Internal Revenue, 76 F.4th 230, 245 (3d Cir. 2023).

Holte has also embraced corpus linguistics, using it in his 2020 decision in Nycal Offshore Dev. Corp. v. United States, 148 Fed. Cl. 1 (2020) to determine the meaning of an ambiguous Reconstruction era statute. In doing so, Holte looked to "passage-era dictionary definitions" to understand the provision's "ordinary meaning when" it was passed.

== Memberships ==
He has been a member of the Federalist Society since 2005.

Legal offices
Preceded by Nancy B. Firestone	Judge of the United States Court of Federal Claims; 2019–present	Incumbent
