= Mark A. Young =

American lawyer

Mark Young
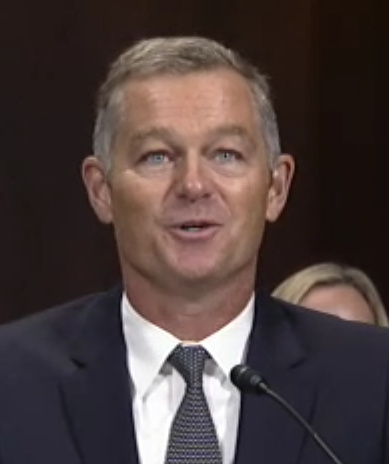

Judge of the Los Angeles County Superior Court
- Incumbent
- Assumed office 2008

Personal details
- Born: Mark Anthony Hannan Young; 1969 (age 55–56); Melbourne, Australia
- Education: University of California, Los; Angeles (BA); University of Southern California (JD)

Mark Anthony Hannan Young (born 1969) is an American lawyer and California Judge and is a former nominee to be a United States district judge of the United States District Court for the Central District of California.

== Biography ==
Young received a Bachelor of Arts degree in 1991 from the University of California, Los Angeles. He received a Juris Doctor in 1995 from the University of Southern California Gould School of Law. He started his legal career as an associate at the law firm of White & Case, from 1995 to 1998. From 1998 to 2008, he served as an Assistant United States Attorney in the Central District of California, as Deputy Chief of the Organized Crime Drug Task Force, from 2005 to 2007, and as Executive Assistant United States Attorney, from 2007 to 2008. Since 2008, he has served as a Judge of the Los Angeles County Superior Court, where he presides over criminal matters.

== Expired nomination to district court ==
On July 17, 2015, President Obama nominated Young to serve as a United States District Judge of the United States District Court for the Central District of California, to the seat vacated by Judge Audrey B. Collins, who retired on August 1, 2014. He received a hearing before the United States Senate Judiciary Committee on October 21, 2015. On November 5, 2015 his nomination was reported out of committee by voice vote. His nomination expired on January 3, 2017, with the end of the 114th Congress.
