= Michael Green (New York lawyer) =

Michael Charles Green (born 1961) is the executive commissioner of the New York State Division of Criminal Justice Services (DCJS). He is the former District Attorney for Monroe County, New York. During 2011, he was a federal judicial nominee for the United States District Court for the Western District of New York, and although he was reported out of committee to the floor of the United States Senate, Green never received a floor vote, and President Obama did not renominate him in the next session of Congress.

== Early life and education ==
A native of Henrietta, New York, Green attended McQuaid Jesuit High School in Rochester, New York. He received a Bachelor of Science degree from LeMoyne College in Syracuse, New York in 1983. Green then earned his Juris Doctor from Western New England College School of Law in 1986.

== Career ==
Green joined the Monroe County district attorney's office in 1987. In 2001, Monroe County District Attorney Howard Relin appointed Green to be first assistant district attorney. Green was elected as Monroe County District Attorney in 2003, after Relin chose not to seek reelection.

Green had been a member of the Republican Party prior to running for office in 2003, but the party was not supportive of his candidacy. Green won election in 2003 after switching to the Democratic Party.

Prior to being elected District Attorney, Green served as an Assistant District Attorney for 17 years. For the three years before his election, he served as the First Assistant District Attorney, responsible for the homicide prosecutions in Monroe County.

He has served in numerous other capacities in the office, including as the Capital Crimes Prosecutor, Deputy Chief of the Major Felony Bureau, Chief of the DWI Bureau, and trial attorney in the Major Felony Bureau. He has tried over 100 jury trials, and has prosecuted 40 homicide cases. He has been lead prosecutor on four first degree murder cases, including one of the few capital cases to end with a death sentence in New York. As District Attorney, Green continues to personally prosecute homicide and other high-profile cases.

== Judicial nomination ==
In July 2010, New York Senator Charles Schumer recommended Green to fill a vacancy on the United States District Court for the Western District of New York. On January 26, 2011, President Barack Obama formally nominated Green to a judgeship on the Western District of New York. Green would have filled the vacancy created by Judge David G. Larimer.

Green's nomination was voted out of the United States Senate Committee on the Judiciary in June 2011, but his nomination languished on the Senate floor for the next six months. Utah Sen. Mike Lee was the lone senator to oppose Green in the committee vote, and no Republican senators publicly explained their opposition to his nomination. In follow-up questions to his hearing testimony, however, several Republican senators focused on Green's decision to seek drug treatment rather than jail for some offenders, while others queried Green about his views on the death penalty.

Ultimately, at the behest of Senate Republicans, Green's nomination was one of a small number of executive and judicial branch nominations to be returned to President Obama on December 17, 2011, pursuant to the rules of the Senate. On December 18, 2011, a White House spokesman told a local newspaper that Obama would not be renominating Green to the seat. "Mike Green would have made an outstanding judge and it is very unfortunate not only for him, but for a strong judiciary, that partisan politics stood in the way," Schumer said in a statement on December 18, 2011.

On December 19, 2011, Green said at a press conference that he blamed local opposition on his failed judicial nomination, as a result of his prosecution of public corruption. "I'm proud of the decisions I've made as DA,” Green said. "I can hold my head up high and leave this office."

== After the judicial nomination ==
Green completed his term as district attorney at the end of December 2011. He did not seek re-election in November 2011.

In February 2012, New York Governor Andrew Cuomo named Green as Executive Commissioner of the New York State Division of Criminal Justice Services (DCJS).

in 2017, Green was accused of punishing female employees for speaking up about sexual harassment in the workplace.

== See also ==
- Barack Obama judicial appointment controversies
- https://www.democratandchronicle.com/story/news/politics/albany/2018/12/27/michael-green-dcjs-harassment-claims/2421750002/
