= Meade Whitaker =

American judge (1919–2005)

Meade Whitaker (March 22, 1919 – October 5, 2005) was a judge of the United States Tax Court from 1982 to 1989.

== Early life, education, and career ==
Born in Washington, D.C., Whitaker was raised in New York, and received a B.A. with honors from Yale University in 1940. He served in the United States Marine Corps during World War II, from 1941 to 1946, after which he received an LL.B. from the University of Virginia in 1948. While a student there, he served on the board of editors of the Virginia Law Review, and was a member of the Order of the Coif. Whitaker was admitted to the bar in Alabama in 1948, thereafter working for the Birmingham, Alabama firm of Cabaniss & Johnston and its successors for over two decades.

== Government service and later life ==
Whitaker served as Tax Legislative Counsel of the United States Department of the Treasury from July 1969 to October 1970, thereafter returning to private practice until 1973, when President Richard Nixon nominated Whitaker to the position of Chief Counsel for the Internal Revenue Service, where he served from September 1973 to January 1977. He worked for the firm of Arter and Hadden in Washington, D.C. from 1977 to 1978, and was then Director for Federal Taxes for the Ford Motor Company in Dearborn, Michigan from 1978 to 1981.

On November 14, 1981, President Ronald Reagan appointed Whitaker to a seat on the United States Tax Court, for a 15-year term, beginning January 12, 1982. Whitaker assumed senior status March 22, 1987, and retired from the court entirely on January 31, 1995.

== Personal life and death ==
Whitaker married Carol DeKleva on December 26, 1972. He had a daughter and two sons from a previous marriage, one of whom predeceased him. Whitaker died at Memorial Hospital in Easton, Maryland, at the age of 86.
