= NSPM-7 =

2025 US President Trump national security directive

- Countering Domestic Terrorism and Organized Political Violence
- President: Donald Trump
- Signed: September 25, 2025; 13 months ago

Federal Register details
- Federal Register document number: 2025-19141
- Publication date: September 30, 2025
- Document citation: 90 FR 47225

Designating Antifa as a Domestic Terrorist Organization
- President: Donald Trump
- Signed: September 22, 2025; 13 months ago

Federal Register details
- Federal Register document number: 2025-18709
- Publication date: September 25, 2025
- Document citation: 90 FR 46317

Donald Trump signs NSPM-7 on September 25, 2025.

National Security Presidential Memorandum-7 (NSPM-7), titled "Countering Domestic Terrorism and Organized Political Violence", is a United States National Security Presidential Memorandum (NSPM) issued by President Donald Trump on September 25, 2025. NSPM-7 directs a "comprehensive" strategy to "disrupt" entities and individuals purported to be "engaged in acts of political violence and intimidation". NSPM-7 describes such alleged political violence as "sophisticated, organized campaigns" united by anti-fascism, with "common threads animating this violent conduct include anti-Americanism, anti-capitalism, and anti-Christianity; support for the overthrow of the United States Government; extremism on migration, race, and gender; and hostility towards those who hold traditional American views on family, religion, and morality."

NSPM-7 was criticized as seeking to chill and target opponents which broadly includes anyone who holds supposed anti-capitalist or anti-American views and organizes around those ideas. The Brennan Center said, "much of NSPM-7 is squarely directed at speech and nonviolent action by organizations and individuals protected by the First Amendment."

Days before signing NSPM-7, Trump signed an order, "Designating Antifa as a Domestic Terrorist Organization".

== Background ==
The emergence of antifa in modern conservative political discourse in the US dates back to Donald Trump's first inauguration on January 20, 2017, when white supremacist Richard B. Spencer was punched in the face by a masked protester. Republican lawmakers have since made efforts to pass legislation against antifa, including the unsuccessful Unmasking Antifa Act of 2018 introduced by Dan Donovan and an unsuccessful resolution introduced Bill Cassidy and Ted Cruz in 2019. In 2020, FBI Director Christopher A. Wray told the House Committee on Homeland Security that antifa is "not a group or an organization. It’s a movement or an ideology."

=== Reactions to the assassination of Charlie Kirk ===
The organized doxxing campaigns, the organized riots, the organized street violence, the organized campaigns of dehumanization, vilification, posting people’s addresses, combining that with messaging that’s designed to trigger, incite violence in the actual organized cells that carry out and facilitate the violence. It is a vast domestic terror movement. ... With God as my witness, we are going to use every resource we have at the Department of Justice, Homeland Security, and throughout this government to identify, disrupt, dismantle and destroy these networks and make America safe again for the American people.

–Stephen Miller, White House deputy chief of staff, speaking with Vice President JD Vance who was hosting The Charlie Kirk Show on September 15 after the assassination of Charlie Kirk

After the September 10 assassination of right-wing political activist Charlie Kirk, White House deputy chief of staff Stephen Miller alleged there was an "organized campaign that led to this assassination", describing it as a "vast domestic terror movement" that the federal government would pursue with "every resource we have at the Department of Justice, Homeland Security, and throughout this government to identify, disrupt, dismantle and destroy these networks." On September 17, Kyle Shideler, a director at the Center for Security Policy, published a memo in The American Mind of the Claremont Institute calling for the Trump administration to create a "Far-Left Violent Extremist" category of domestic terrorism.

=== Executive order designating of antifa as a domestic terrorist organization ===
Three days before the issuance of NSPM-7, Trump signed an order, "Designating Antifa as a Domestic Terrorist Organization". Antifa is not an "organization," but rather a movement. Designation of US organizations as terrorist organizations does not exist under US law absent a connection to a foreign terrorist organization.

Current Affairs described the British government's June 23, 2025 proscription of Palestine Action, a Palestine solidarity direct action network based in the UK, as a terrorist organization, as a counterpart to NSPM-7. In August 2026, the US labeled Palestine Action a specially designated global terrorist.

== Content ==
The first paragraph says "Heinous assassinations and other acts of political violence in the United States have dramatically increased in recent years" and specifically reference the Assassination of Charlie Kirk, Killing of Brian Thompson, Brett Kavanaugh assassination plot, two assassination attempts against Donald Trump during the 2024 Presidential election cycle, 2025 Dallas ICE facility shooting and "a more than 1,000 percent increase in attacks on" ICE.

The order alleges: "political violence is not a series of isolated incidents and does not emerge organically. Instead, it is a culmination of sophisticated, organized campaigns of targeted intimidation, radicalization, threats, and violence". It argues: "A new law enforcement strategy that investigates all participants in these criminal and terroristic conspiracies — including the organized structures, networks, entities, organizations, funding sources, and predicate actions behind them — is required (...) to investigate and disrupt networks, entities, and organizations (...) Through this comprehensive strategy, law enforcement will disband and uproot networks, entities, and organizations that promote organized violence, violent intimidation, conspiracies against rights, and other efforts to disrupt the functioning of a democratic society." The order also claims:

There are common recurrent motivations and indicia uniting this pattern of violent and terroristic activities under the umbrella of self-described “anti-fascism.” These movements portray foundational American principles (e.g., support for law enforcement and border control) as “fascist” to justify and encourage acts of violent revolution. This “anti-fascist” lie has become the organizing rallying cry used by domestic terrorists to wage a violent assault against democratic institutions, constitutional rights, and fundamental American liberties. Common threads animating this violent conduct include anti-Americanism, anti-capitalism, and anti-Christianity; support for the overthrow of the United States Government; extremism on migration, race, and gender; and hostility towards those who hold traditional American views on family, religion, and morality. As described in the Order of September 22, 2025 (Designating Antifa as a Domestic Terrorist Organization)

NSPM-7 instructs the Joint Terrorism Task Force (JTTF) to "coordinate and supervise a comprehensive national strategy to investigate, prosecute, and disrupt entities and individuals engaged in acts of political violence and intimidation designed to suppress lawful political activity or obstruct the rule of law," and investigate "all participants in these criminal and terroristic conspiracies—including the organized structures, networks, entities, organizations, funding sources, and predicate actions behind them."

The United States Attorney General was instructed to prosecute federal crimes related to these investigations, and to "issue specific guidance that ensures domestic terrorism priorities include politically motivated terrorist acts" such as assault, civil disorder, destruction of property, organized doxing, looting, rioting, swatting, threats of violence, and trespass. The Attorney General may also "recommend that any group or entity whose members are engaged in activities meeting the definition of 'domestic terrorism' in 18 U.S.C. 2331(5) merits designation as a 'domestic terrorist organization.'" The Treasury Secretary and Commissioner of Internal Revenue are instructed to disrupt the funding sources of organizations found to be involved in "political violence or domestic terrorism."

== Actions ==
Three days before the issuance of NSPM-7, Antifa was designated as a "Domestic Terrorist Organization" under an executive order by President Donald Trump.

The memorandum was subsequently cited in a September 29, 2025, memorandum by the United States Attorney General Pam Bondi titled "Ending Political Violence Against ICE [Immigration and Customs Enforcement]."

In November 2025, the administration announced it would designate four European Antifa groups as Foreign Terrorist Organizations. The State Department's press release said the designation "supports President Trump’s National Security Presidential Memorandum-7".

On December 4, 2025, Bondi issued a memo instructing federal prosecutors and law enforcement to investigate Antifa and other "extremist groups" performing "domestic terrorism" activities per NSPM-7 (including "tax crimes" against the IRS), the FBI to compile a list of "domestic terrorism" organizations, and "review their files and holdings for Antifa and Antifa-related intelligence and information and coordinate delivery of such material to the FBI for review."

According to an internal report, the FBI has launched "criminal and domestic terrorism investigations" into "threats against immigration enforcement activity."

Following the killing of Alex Pretti, the Department of Homeland Security launched Operation Puppet Master and Project Whipple Shield, two surveillance operations targeting progressive organizations, labor unions, and other groups allegedly opposed to the Trump administration's Operation Metro Surge. Undercover agents infiltrated protest group chats and attempted to entice people into discussing or committing crimes. Agents also infiltrated community meetings held in churches, schools and parks and tracked license plate numbers to compile names of people who attended gatherings. Agents used facial recognition software Clearview AI to compile photo dossiers of activists. DHS agents also filed administrative subpoenas to obtain the financial records of multiple organizations. Organizations targeted include the AFL-CIO, Sunrise Movement, Service Employees International Union, Minneapolis Federation of Educators, Minnesota Association of Professional Employees, Democratic Socialists of America, Showing Up for Racial Justice, Minnesota 50501, and Communications Workers of America. The New York Times noted that the operations were reminiscent of COINTELPRO.

In January 2026, following the killing of Renée Good by an by ICE agent in Minneapolis, Vice President JD Vance announced an assistant attorney general, with "all the benefits, all the resources, all the authority of a special counsel, but (...) run out of the White House under the supervision of me and the president", "who is going to prosecute and investigate their fraud and their violence more aggressively" as part of what the administration is doing "to try to find the financing networks and the domestic terrorism networks that legitimate this violence, that fund this violence, and that of course engage in the violence."

In March 2026, a jury convicted 9 people of providing material support to terrorists for the 2025 Alvarado ICE facility incident in "the first time that terrorism charges had been successfully brought against purported members of Antifa." Later that same month, CBS News reported that the FBI and IRS were forming a new incentive to investigate non-profit organizations over suspected links to domestic terrorism.

In April 2026 Ken Klippenstein reported that in the 2027 fiscal year budget request by Trump, it was stated that the FBI created at some point between September 2025 and March 2026 the "NSPM-7 Joint Mission center" which the budget request described as including people from ten agencies and is tasked to counter targets of NSPM-7 "by integrating intelligence, operational support, and financial analysis" to identify and prosecute targets of NSPM-7 and related actors. The same month Zeteo obtained FBI e-mails which revealed that the FBI was conducting training for U.S. state and local law enforcement on the directive.

In May 2026, the White House published a counterterrorism strategy that included references to "violent left-wing extremists, including anarchists and anti-fascists" as one of three main terrorist threats to the United States, citing "the politically motivated killings of Christians and conservatives committed by violent left-wing extremists". The document also stated that the US counterterrorism strategy would "prioritize the rapid identification and neutralization of violent secular political groups whose ideology is anti-American, radically pro-transgender, and anarchists", "map their ties to international organizations like Antifa, and use law enforcement tools to cripple them operationally before they can maim or kill the innocent." Klippenstein described the strategy as equating forms of left-wing extremism as being equivalent to legacy terrorist threats such as Islamic and narcoterrorism. He also suggested a potential crackdown on pro-Palestinian groups due to its references to “new and deepening alliances between the far-left and Islamists, i.e., the 'Red-Green' alliance," with Klippenstein stating that the term "Red-Green alliance" is used to suggest a conspiratorial alignment between the American left and radical Islam.

In July 2026, secretary of state Marco Rubio, citing NSPM-7, announced a policy banning visas for people aligned with "far-left terrorism" and who participated in "economic sabotage". It did not provide definitions for the terms, with Roger Williams University law professor Peter Margulies stating that Boycott, Divestment and Sanctions (BDS) and environmental activists could be targeted by the policy.

In August 2026, the State Department announced it would designate Autistici/Inventati as a Specially Designated Global Terrorist.

=== Prosecutions ===
A group of alleged antifa members involved in the 2025 Prairieland ICE detention center incident were prosecuted in federal district Court in Fort Worth, Texas. On June 25, 2026, they were sentenced to thirty to hundred years in prison. All the defendants have appealed their convictions.

Another group in Minnesota tracking ICE activity were investigated under NSPM-7 on various charges, including conspiring to impede or injure a federal officer, interstate stalking, felony assault, solicitation to commit a crime of violence, and interstate threats.

== Reactions ==
On September 25, 2025, the American Civil Liberties Union (ACLU) issued a statement condemning the directive, with ACLU's National Security Project director writing, "Working from a fever dream of conspiracies, President Trump has launched yet another effort to investigate and intimidate his critics."

On September 26, Human Rights Watch acting executive director Federico Borello issued a statement writing that "President Trump’s order mobilizing federal law enforcement to investigate perceived opponents of his administration turns reality on its head." On the same day, the National Coalition Against Censorship characterized the directive as a "blueprint for law enforcement to cast a wide net in the name of terrorism and political violence, but it is unmistakable in targeting political opponents in its crosshairs."

By September 30, more than 3,000 NGOs had signed an open letter opposing the directive.

In October, more than 30 members of Congress sent a letter to President Trump raising constitutional and civil liberties issues and expressing concern that NSPM-7 could be used to crack down on dissent.

In a newsletter to his constituents, Democratic Congressman Ro Khanna described the memorandum as "one of his [Trump's] most dangerous power grabs yet." Elsewhere, Khanna stated, "The goal is to silence people and groups by threatening retaliation."

On October 1, 2025, Miles Taylor, who served as Chief of Staff of the United States Department of Homeland Security during the first Trump Administration, wrote that the directive was "Orwellian beyond belief."

National security journalist Fred Kaplan wrote that Trump is "laying the groundwork for a police state" with NSPM-7, which he deemed "the clearest statement of Trump's intentions." Investigative journalist Ken Klippenstein characterized the directive as treating political dissent as a form of domestic terrorism, and wrote in Truthout that NSPM-7 was "a declaration of war on anyone who does not support the Trump administration and its agenda."

The New Republic published that "McCarthyism is so back."

=== Brennan Center analysis ===
The Brennan Center for Justice found numerous flaws in an analysis of NSPM-7, along with a concomitant presidential order: "Designating Antifa as a Domestic Terrorist Organization." The Brennan report concluded, "both the order and the memo are ungrounded in fact and law." Among the criticisms:

- Regarding the legal basis, the Brennan report calls out "the failure to cite any statute or constitutional provision in support of the president’s action." The report authors state the president has no authority to declare domestic terrorist organizations, noting that the laws and Supreme Court decisions authorizing the declaration of foreign terrorist organizations had ruled out domestic designations.
- Regarding the factual basis, the Brennan report notes that the "cherry-picked" incidents of violence were not coordinated campaigns of violence and intimidation, as the NSPM memo was constructed to address.
- Regarding the scope of the orders, the Brennan Center report says that the orders could target a broad range of disfavored groups and views, encompassing "everyone from labor organizers, socialists, many libertarians, those who criticize Christianity, pro-immigration groups, anti-ICE protestors, and racial justice and transgender activists, to anyone who holds views that the administration considers to be 'anti-American.'"

== See also ==
- Donald Trump and fascism
- Mass surveillance
- McCarthyism
- Political repression in the United States
- War on terror
