= Surveillance abuse =

Unsanctioned or illegal monitoring of a person or group

Surveillance abuse is the use of surveillance methods or technology, including targeted surveillance and mass surveillance, to monitor the activity of an individual or group of individuals in ways that violate social norms, laws, or human rights.

== Patterns ==
To align with the Universal Declaration of Human Rights, use of communications surveillance must be lawful, have legitimate aims such as public safety or national security, be necessary and proportional to the legitimate aims, be monitored against abuse by judicial authority, respect due process, and provide appropriate public transparency, among other principles.

Governments have abused surveillance technologies to target protestors and dissidents in ways that result in restricting their civil and political rights, profile people on the basis of ethnicity or race in ways that support discrimination, and undermine people's right to privacy, among other impacts.

== Examples ==
During the U.S. FBI's COINTELPRO operations between 1956 and 1971, there was widespread surveillance abuse which targeted political dissidents, primarily people from the political left and civil rights movement. The Church Committee investigated and reported on these abuses in 1975–1976.

The 2013 Snowden disclosures included evidence of "LOVEINT", the practice of U.S. National Security Agency employees using their extensive monitoring capabilities to spy on a love interest or spouse.

In the 2010s and 2020s, the Pegasus Project revealed governments' espionage on journalists, opposition politicians, activists, business people and others using the private Pegasus spyware developed by the Israeli technology and cyber-arms company NSO Group. In 2025, Citizen Lab found evidence that the Italian government had targeted three European investigative journalists with Paragon Solutions spyware on their devices.

The Chinese government's persecution of Uyghurs in China (2014–present) has involved deployment of mass surveillance systems, including cellphone surveillance and biometric data, in ways that support political repression and violate human rights.

Surveillance abuse also happens on a smaller scale. In 2005, government workers in Liverpool used street CCTV pan-tilt-zoom cameras to spy on a woman in her flat. In Robbins v. Lower Merion School District (2010), parents in Pennsylvania sued their son's school for allegedly watching him through his laptop's webcam while he was at home and unaware he was being observed.

A device which may be used to abuse surveillance, called an IMSI-catcher or Stingray phone tracker, acts and looks similar to a cellphone tower but tricks mobile devices into connecting with it. After connection, an operator can intercept phone calls and text messages from anyone in the relevant area or as part of an investigation of a particular person nearby. These devices have been exported to countries with histories of abusing surveillance technologies.

Canada's Communications Security Establishment (CSE) has spied on Canadians through the public wireless internet connections in an airport in the country. Through this they gathered information on who people called or texted and where they were when they communicated with others. The CSE searched through approximately 10-15 million downloads daily.

In the United States, law enforcement has used ALPR technology to investigate women seeking reproductive care, track romantic rivals, and stalk love interests.

== See also ==
- Emergency data request
- Stalkerware
- Category:Surveillance scandals
