= LOVEINT =

Use of intelligence monitoring to spy on love interests

LOVEINT is a form of surveillance abuse where intelligence service employees make use of their extensive monitoring capabilities to spy on their love interest or spouse. The term was coined in resemblance to intelligence terminology such as SIGINT, COMINT or HUMINT.

== National Security Agency ==
The term LOVEINT originated at the NSA, where approximately one such incident is reported per year. In 2013, eight had been reported in the preceding decade, and they were the majority of unauthorized accesses reported by the NSA. Most incidents are self-reported, for example during a polygraph test. The NSA sanctions them with administrative action up to termination of employment. In five of the cases, the NSA employee resigned, preempting any administrative action. In two other cases, they retired. The worst administrative sanction handed out was "a reduction in pay for two months, a reduction in grade, and access to classified information being revoked." One case was forwarded to the Department of Justice, which declined to prosecute.

== German Federal Intelligence Service ==
In September 2007, it was reported that an employee of the German Federal Intelligence Service abused his monitoring powers to read the email traffic of his wife's lover.

== See also ==
- 2013 global surveillance disclosures
- Cyberstalking
- Surveillance abuse
- Category:Surveillance scandals
- SEXINT
- The use of LOVEINT is a major plot point in the 1994 James Cameron action comedy True Lies
- The use of LOVEINT is a partial plot point in the 2025 Rich Lee adaptation of H. G. Wells The War of the Worlds.
