= Occupy ICE =

Occupy movement-modeled U.S. protests

Occupy ICE was a series of protests, modeled on the Occupy Movement, that emerged in the United States in reaction to the Trump administration family separation policy, with a goal of disrupting operations at several U.S. Immigration and Customs Enforcement (ICE) locations.

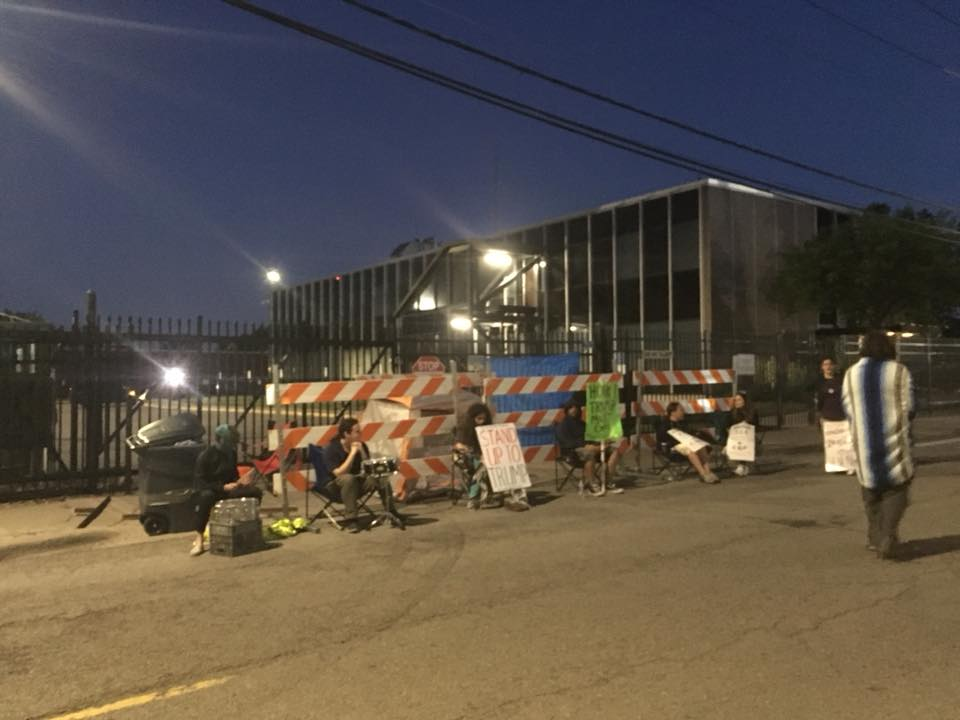
Protesters block the entrance of the Detroit ICE Field Office on June 25, 2018

== Background ==
The protests began in Portland, Oregon, on June 17, 2018, under the moniker OccupyICEPDX after a rally against President Donald Trump's "Zero Tolerance Policy" grew into a vigil and occupation, which resulted in an ICE detention center there being closed indefinitely. Protests have taken place at ICE headquarters in New York City, and at facilities in Los Angeles, Chicago, Detroit, Louisville, Washington state, and Utah.

The movement arose following media reports of more than 2000 children being separated from their parents after the parents were arrested for illegally crossing into the U.S. via Mexico. The family separation was a result of a "zero tolerance" policy enacted by Donald Trump in April 2018 as part of the Trump administration's immigration reform efforts.

While the protests have been likened to the Occupy Wall Street movement, the first series of Occupy ICE protests seen in Portland were unplanned and organic. The first camp in Portland grew from a rally organized by Jacob Bureros of Direct Action Alliance with support from local immigrant rights groups and attended by local leaders, including former Portland NAACP head and current Portland City Councilor Jo Ann Hardesty and Oregon State Representative Chris Gorsek. A vigil to honor people who had suffered from the policies grew from participants in the rally and march who stayed and talked about how to potentially have more of an impact.

== Protests ==
=== Locations ===
==== Portland, Oregon ====
On June 17, 2018, hundreds of protesters assembled outside of an ICE facility in Portland, Oregon, at a rally called by Jacob Bureros of Direct Action Alliance. Following the rally, a group of activists decided to hold a 24-hour vigil to honor the victims of the "Zero Tolerance Policy" under the moniker OccupyICEPDX. Following confrontations between ICE agents and protesters, which were broadcast by Direct Action Alliance on Facebook Live on June 18 and 19, a much larger group of people had gathered outside of the location by the 20th of June, and Immigration and Customs Enforcement announced they would close indefinitely following the city police's refusal to respond to calls for assistance by immigration agents who claimed to be in danger. Law enforcement officers working for the federal government, including Federal Police and ICE agents, moved on demonstrators in the early hours of June 28, arresting multiple activists.

The protest camp remained after the attempted sweep by law enforcement, which only succeeded in clearing the front entrance to the facility; it has been described by federal officials as a "very, very peaceful" protest camp. The camp had a well-stocked kitchen with food and supplies being donated by local residents and many prominent local businesses; onsite child care was available along with basic medical care and even a massage and meditation tent. A 6-ft wooden barricade was constructed by the community to protect the camp from the street. Near to the camp, the Department of Homeland Security built a separate barricade, with federal police erecting a metal fence around the ICE building on July 2.

It was reported on July 5 that three members of the protesters would consume only Gatorade until Portland officials removed ICE from the city in a self-proclaimed hunger strike.

Senator Bill Cassidy called for Portland Mayor Ted Wheeler to step down over the protests. President Donald Trump also criticized Wheeler.

==== Greenwich Village, New York ====
Outside of an ICE building in Greenwich Village, protesters created a rotating group protest outside the facility to call for the abolishment of the facility and an end to the immigration detention center on June 27. The activists stated they took inspiration and networked with other #OccupyICE groups, such as the groups in Portland and Philadelphia.

==== San Francisco, California ====
A camp was created outside an ICE building in San Francisco in July 2018. On July 3, protesters were witnessed blocking the driveway used by vehicles transporting detained individuals, with roughly 35 protesters claiming to not leave until the federal agency is abolished.

In the early hours of Monday, July 9, the camp was raided by the San Francisco Police Department. SFPD arrested 39 protesters, injuring several in the process.

One year later, on Tuesday, July 30, 2019, the street in front of the ICE offices was again occupied by protesters advocating that ICE be abolished. A daylong event billed as a block party became a tent encampment after dark. The encampment lasted until the early hours of the morning on August 1, 2019, when police arrested 18 persons, including one youth, citing them for illegal lodging.

==== Philadelphia, Pennsylvania ====
Outside of an ICE building in Philadelphia on July 2, there was a camp, and police acted quickly to disperse the protesters, arresting protesters and causing injuries. Confrontations between protesters and police continued for five days until the camp was finally raided and moved to City Hall. Protesters have raised demands that Philadelphia end its agreement with the federal government to allow ICE access to city police, court and prosecutorial records filed in the Preliminary Arraignment Reporting System (PARS). The city decided to end the PARS contract.

==== Louisville, Kentucky ====
Protesters began occupying the ICE offices in downtown Louisville on the morning of July 2 with 20 tents. Initially, they had barricaded the entrance/exit of the parking lot for the agency's detainee transport vans. About two hours after the barricade was erected, the Department of Homeland Security destroyed it and several of the tents. The protests continued for the whole day despite this, but protestors were forced to remain off of federally owned property. As of July 7, 2018, protestors and counter-protestors were still present behind police barricades. On Thursday, July 19, Mayor Greg Fischer and Louisville Metro Police Department forced the removal of the protest.

==== Atlanta, Georgia ====
On July 2 in Atlanta, it was reported that police threatened to arrest any protesters who didn't move, causing the protesters to move to a nearby private property. Police had previously claimed that protesters had thrown frozen water bottles and kicked officers the previous day.

==== Wichita, Kansas ====
In July 2018, protesters were asked to leave the parking lot of a private office building that had been rented for use of ICE officials in Wichita. Wichita police officers and Department of Homeland Security Officers told the protesters that they had to leave the property, as the owner did not want them to be there. Thus, many of the protesters moved to the nearby sidewalk, as it was public property. The building was being targeted as a place of protest, as it was believed that it was a detention center for immigrants, although ICE officials claimed that it was an office complex and only housed undocumented immigrants while their paperwork was being processed.

==== Detroit, Michigan ====
In June 2018, protesters placed tents in front of an ICE office within Detroit, Michigan to create a home base, although it was dismantled after five days. Activists at the location claimed demands that included a shutdown of the nation's detention centers, immediate reunification of children with their families, abolishing of ICE, and asylum for all immigrant parents detained trying to enter the United States.

==== Tacoma, Washington ====
It was reported on June 26 that the protest in Tacoma had a typical overnight population of just 20 people, but the group's numbers grew closer to 70 during daylight hours.

==== Los Angeles, California ====
On June 22, dozens of protesters assembled in LA at the Metropolitan Detention Center in protest of ICE. The protest quickly turned into a camp, which also effectively served as a blockade to the main bus entrance for the entirety of its duration. On July 2, Councilman Mike Bonin was arrested alongside 17 other protesters while blocking an additional entrance. On September 11, approximately 60 protesters blocked all entrances to the detention center. The activists decamped on September 16, its 87th day, making it the longest-running Occupy ICE encampment in the country. Over its course, 24 arrests were made, and the additional entrance was blocked multiple times. The camp continues to hold community vigils for the separated families every Friday evening at the detention center.

== Arrests ==
At least nine protesters were arrested in Portland on June 28, according to The Oregonian. In Philadelphia at least 29 protesters were cited by police for "Failure to Disperse" outside of ICE offices on July 2.

== See also ==
- Never Again Action
- Abolish ICE
- Protests against family separation policy
