= Abolish ICE =

American political movement

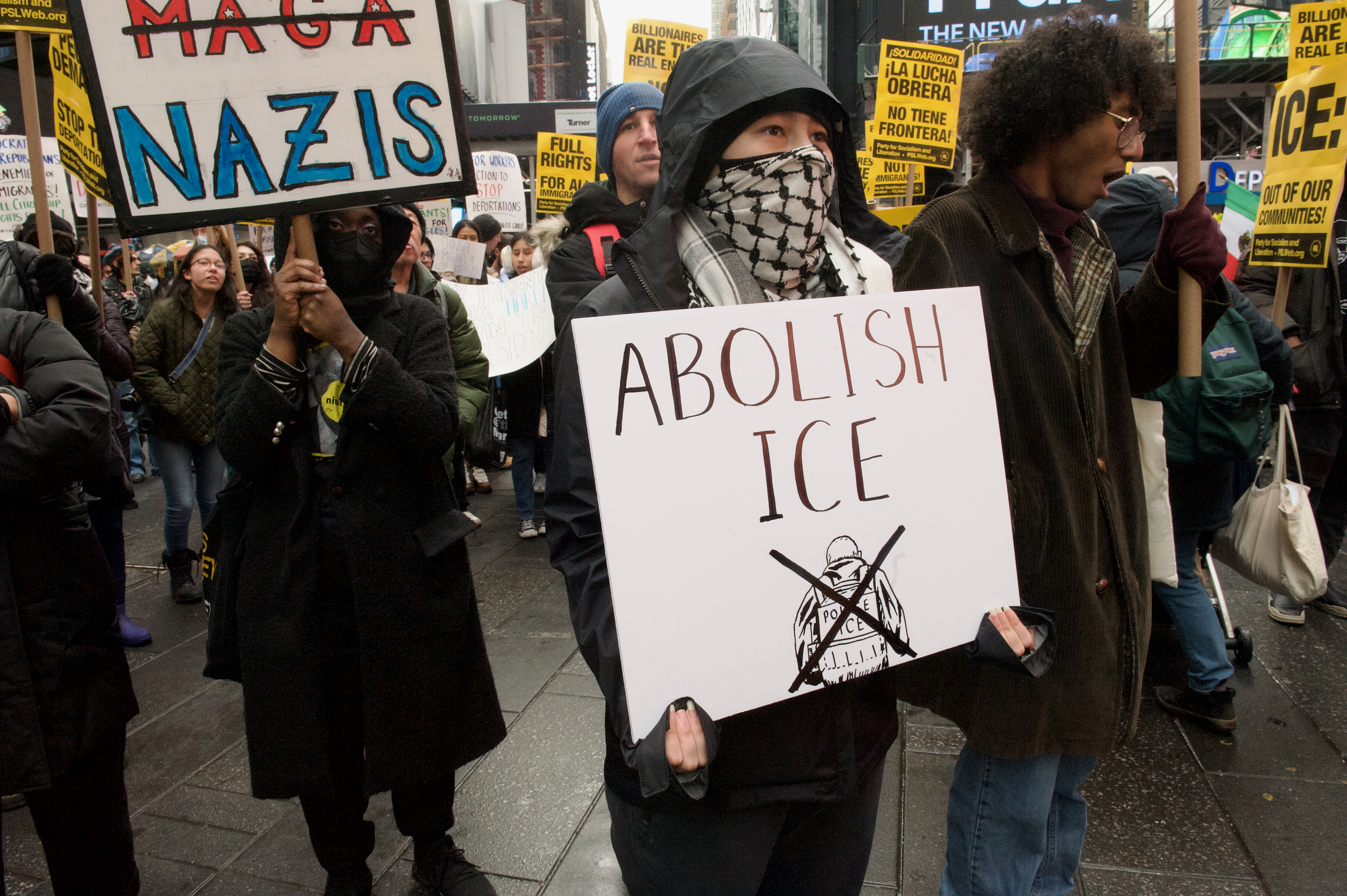
A protester in New York City holds a sign reading "Abolish ICE" in 2025.

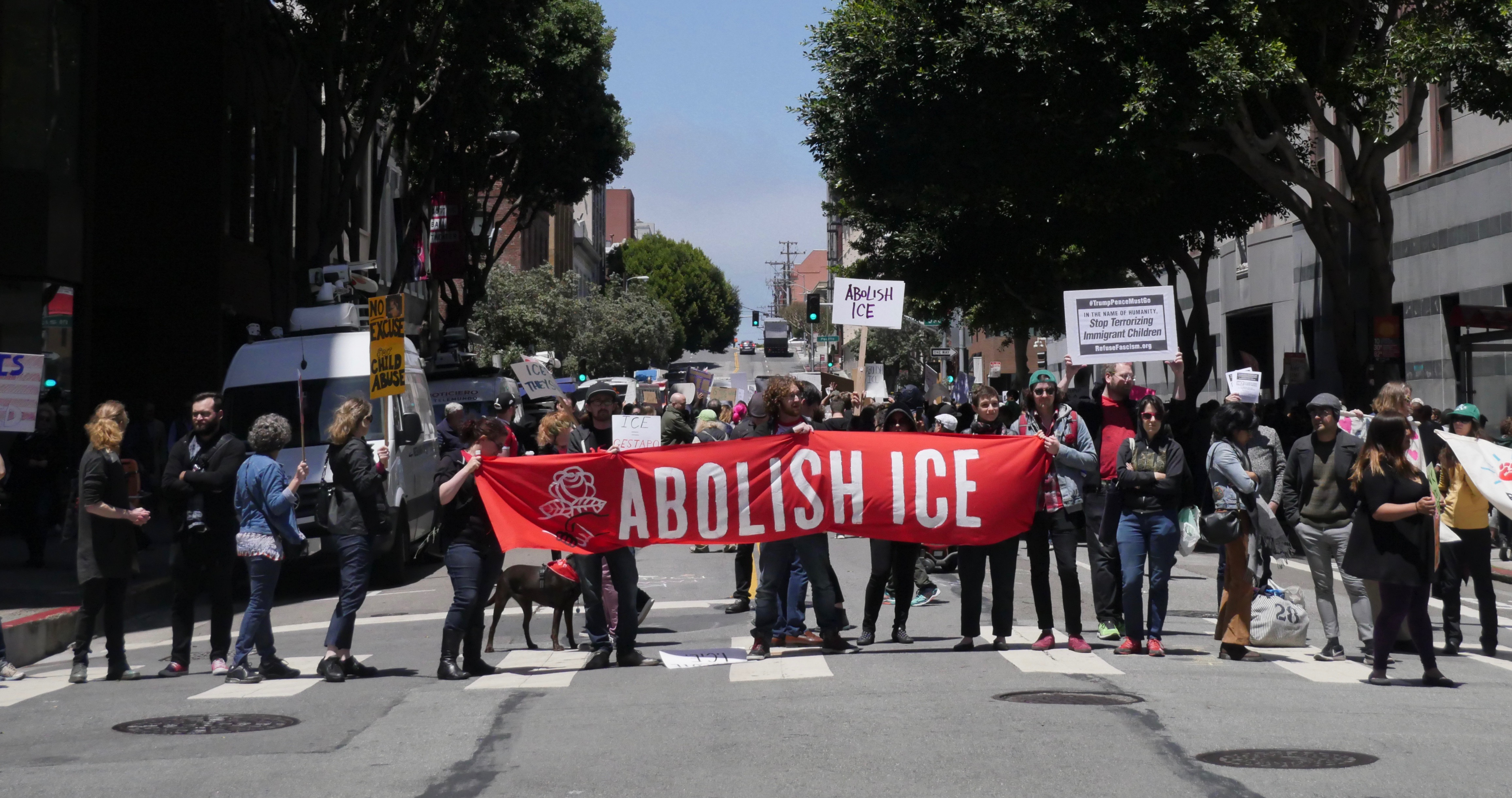
Americans hold a banner reading "Abolish ICE" at a protest in San Francisco denouncing the Trump administration's zero tolerance and family separation policies on June 19, 2018.

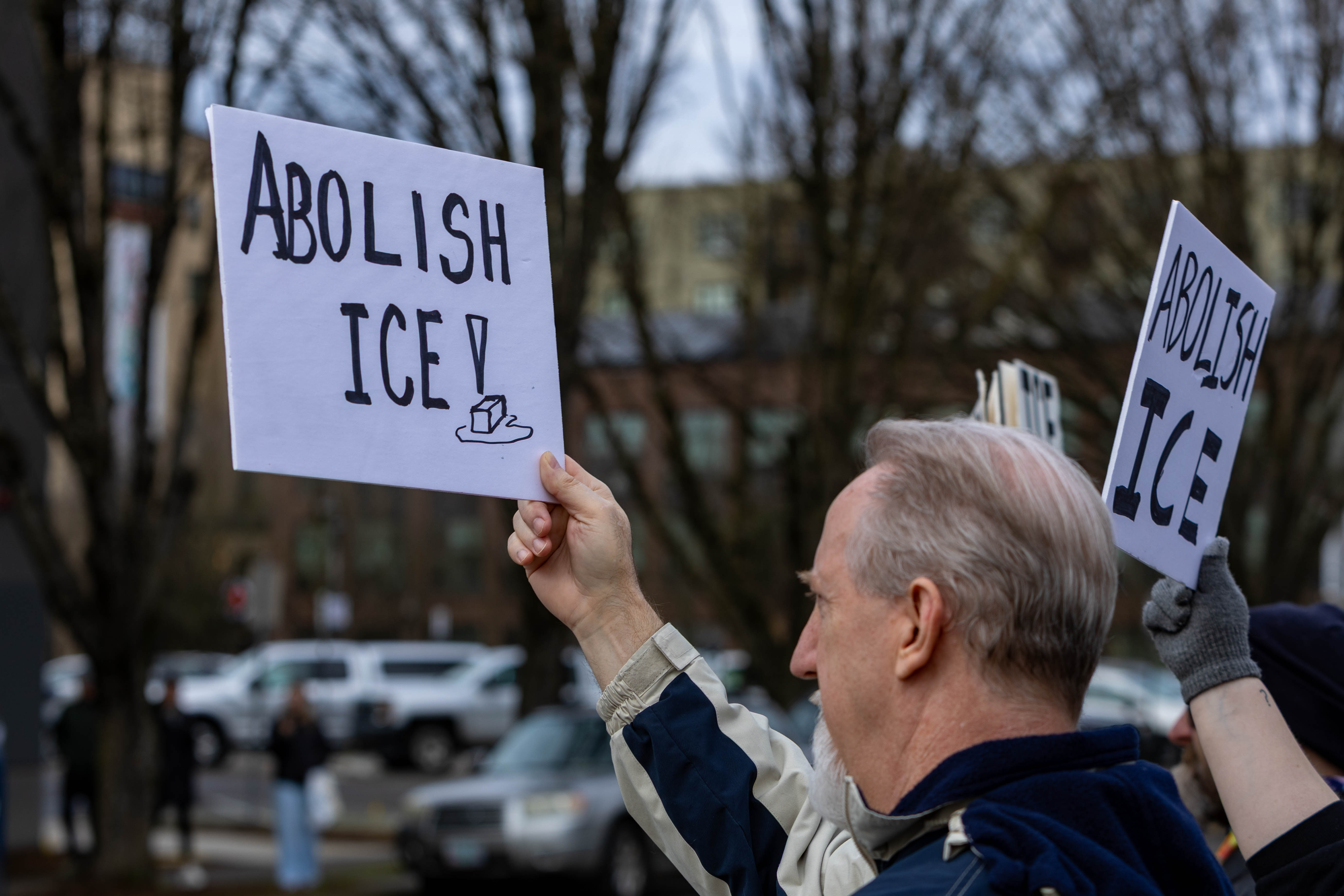
"Abolish ICE" with a stylized melting ice cube at a protest against the Killing of Renée Good in Eugene, Oregon, on January 10, 2026

Abolish ICE is a political movement seeking the abolition of the U.S. Immigration and Customs Enforcement agency (ICE). The movement gained mainstream traction in June 2018 after the controversy of the Trump administration family separation policy. The movement proposes that ICE's responsibilities be subsumed by other existing immigration agencies, as was the case before the agency's creation. Discussions particularly focus on the Enforcement and Removal Operations (ERO) department of ICE. The movement gained renewed attention during Donald Trump's second term as a result of his administration's immigration policies, as well as protests in response to the January 2026 killings of US citizens Renée Good and Alex Pretti during ICE's Operation Metro Surge in Minneapolis, Minnesota.

== Background ==
Immigration and Customs Enforcement was created in 2003 as part of the newly formed U.S. Department of Homeland Security (DHS). The agency's age has been a point of discussion, with proponents of Abolish ICE arguing that the United States can easily do without an agency that has existed for less than 20 years. Though the agency controversially expanded under Barack Obama, frustrating immigrants' rights advocates, its stated focus remained the deportation of undocumented immigrants who were convicted of a crime. In practice, however, ICE had been seen to target people solely for having entered the country illegally.

In 2014, the National Immigration Law Center (NILC) sued ICE and DHS under the Freedom of Information Act (FOIA). The NILC obtained documents that revealed the sharing of information between ICE/DHS and State Motor Vehicle Departments for the purpose of immigration enforcement. After Trump took office in January 2017, his administration began to implement harsher immigration policies, such as denying asylum to refugees and separating undocumented children from their families, which spurred the growth of the movement. Sean McElwee, co-founder of left-wing think tank Data for Progress (DFP), is credited with popularizing the slogan via the hashtag #AbolishICE. According to The Hill, "the hashtag eventually caught on in far-left Twitter circles in memes, with Twitter users incorporating 'Abolish ICE' into their display names and in other ways."

== Timeline ==
In August 2017, a series of protests against the agency took place in Oakland, California. However, a group of Oakland police escorted ICE and DHS agents to the site of a search, sparking controversy and protests over the sanctuary policy breach. ICE later said it was serving a federal search warrant for suspected child trafficking, not conducting a deportation. Conservatives criticized the protesters for interfering with the investigation.

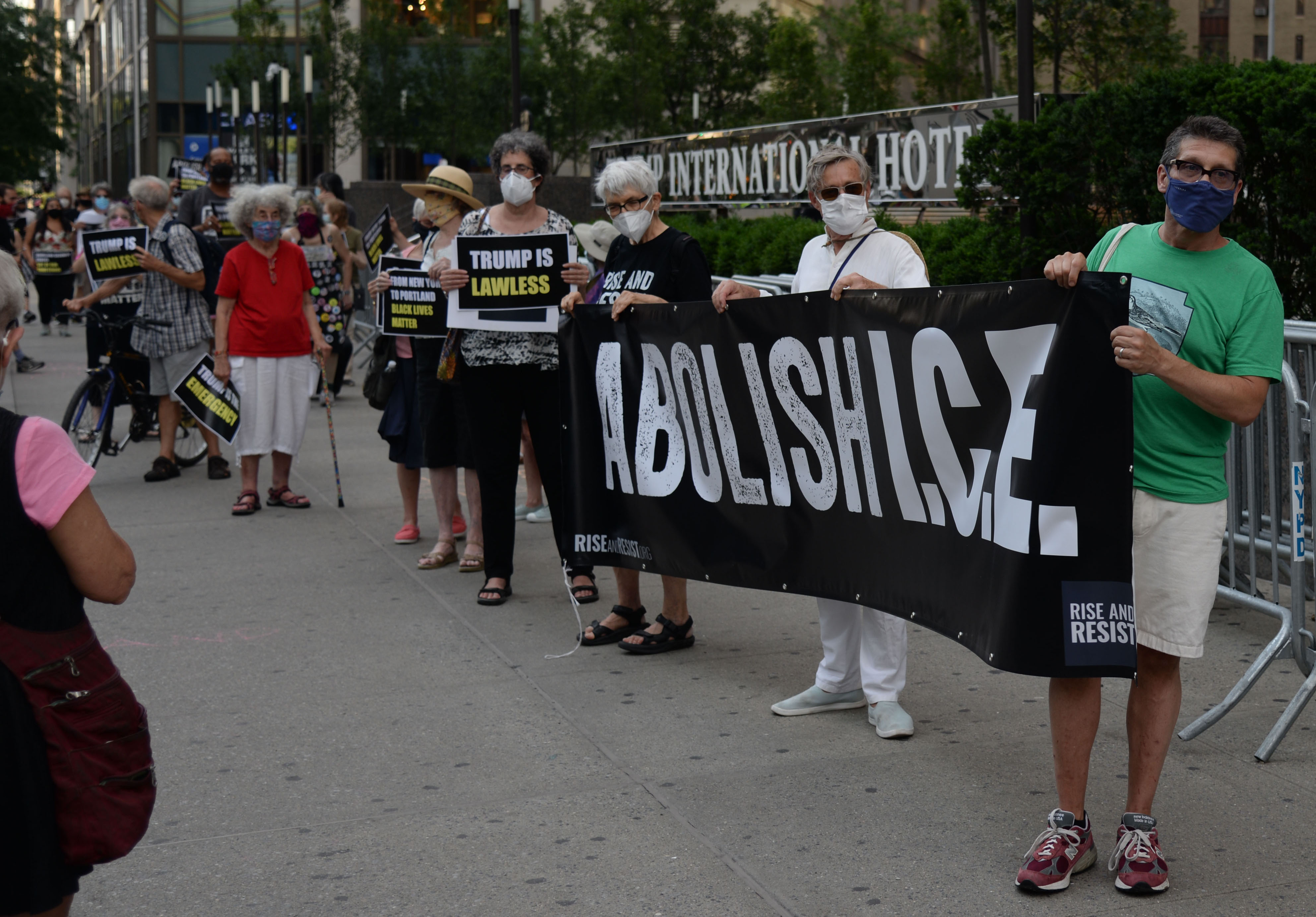
Protestors outside the Trump International Hotel in New York City, 27 July 2020

Controversy over the Trump administration family separation policy in 2018 brought the movement into the mainstream of political discussion. Dan Canon, a Democratic candidate for Congress in Indiana, was the first candidate to call for ICE to be eliminated; Randy Bryce, a Democratic congressional candidate in Wisconsin, followed soon after in April. Bryce's opponent, Paul Ryan, who was then the Speaker of the House of Representatives, said that abolishing ICE was "the craziest position I have ever seen." On June 20, at the height of the family separation controversy, protestors approached Secretary of Homeland Security Kirstjen Nielsen at a restaurant, chanting "Abolish ICE".

Alexandria Ocasio-Cortez, a democratic socialist and Democratic primary challenger to Representative Joseph Crowley, made abolishing ICE one of her top campaign issues. In the wake of her unexpected victory in June 2018, the position became more widely accepted by progressive politicians, including US Senators Elizabeth Warren and Bernie Sanders. The change was particularly strong in Ocasio-Cortez's state of New York, where Senator Kirsten Gillibrand and New York City mayor Bill de Blasio quickly embraced the abolition of ICE after the win.

In June 2018, Wisconsin congressman Mark Pocan announced that he would introduce legislation to dismantle ICE and establish a commission to determine how the government "can implement a humane immigration enforcement system," after visiting the Mexico–United States border and witnessing "the nation's immigration crisis." Pocan was joined by Pramila Jayapal of Washington and Adriano Espaillat of New York in introducing the bill, the Establishing a Humane Immigration Enforcement System Act, in July 2018.

Nineteen ICE agents wrote Secretary Nielsen a letter asking for ICE to be split into two separate agencies because they believed the institution inhibited their ability to do their job. Their proposal would separate the enforcement and removal unit, which is the subject of almost all of the controversy, from the investigations unit that focuses on issues such as fraud, human trafficking, gangs, and drug rings. They believe that sanctuary jurisdictions would be more likely to work with the investigative unit if it were separate.

=== Rallies in support of abolition ===
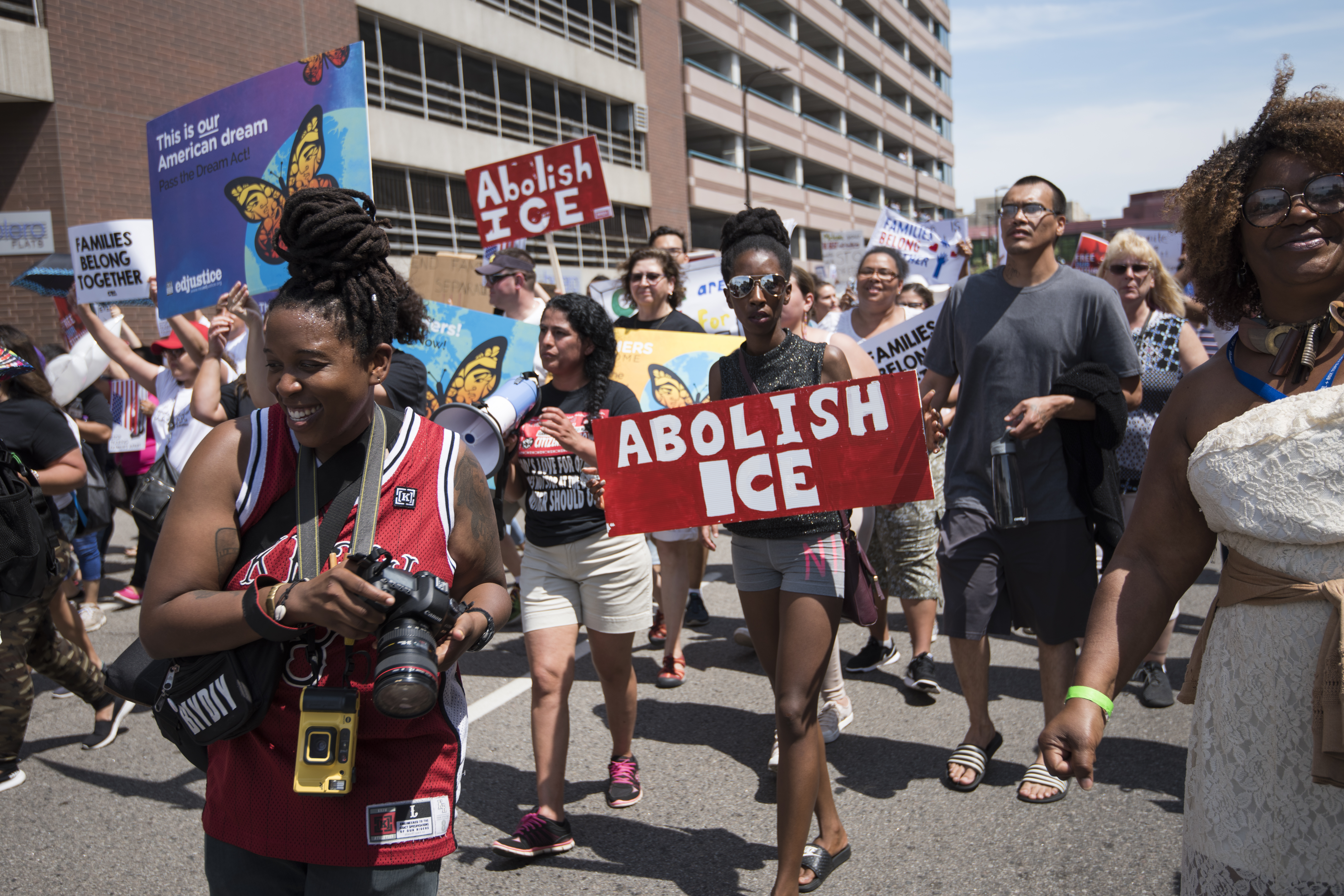
Protestors in Minneapolis call for the abolition of ICE on June 30, 2018.

Several protests, rallies, and marches—including Occupy ICE, Families Belong Together, and Women Disobey—called for the abolition of ICE and decarceration of undocumented immigrants. These rallies took place over several months in over 700 US cities and around the world. Protests calling for the abolition of ICE have erupted again under Trump's second presidency.

=== Second Trump presidency ===
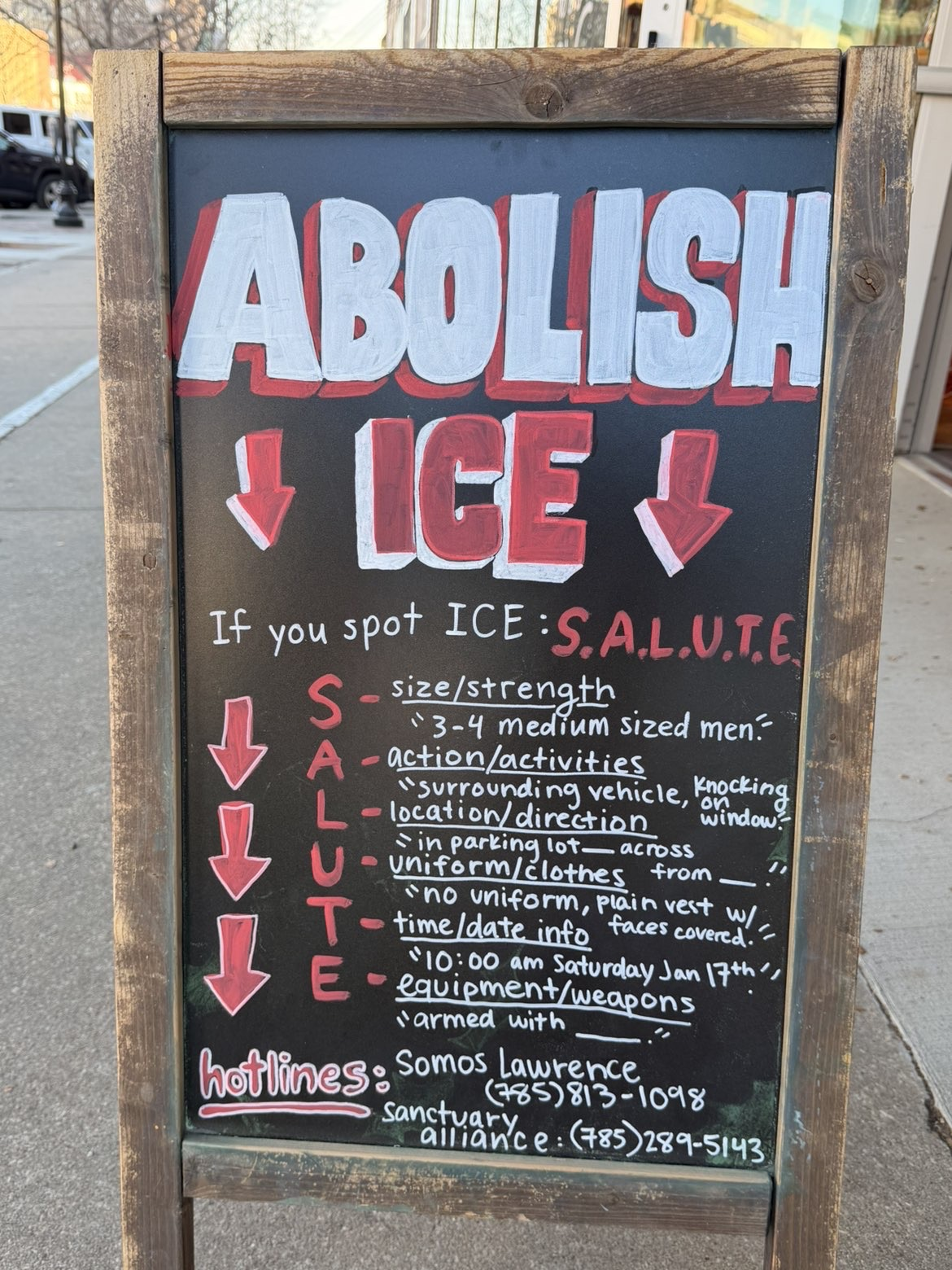
Anti-ICE reporting sign at a business in Lawrence, Kansas

New York City protesters chant "Abolish ICE!" the day after the killing of Renée Good

Under the second Trump Administration, calls to abolish ICE have increased significantly. A growing number of groups and many Democratic politicians have called for its abolition. Notable people who have called for ICE to be abolished include Senate candidate Graham Platner, Representative Alexandria Ocasio-Cortez, and Congressional candidate Cameron Kasky. Public support for abolishing the agency increased significantly in 2025 and 2026. A Civiqs poll found that in August 2024, support for abolishing ICE was just 20%, with 66% opposed. After the 2024 U.S. elections and second inauguration of Donald Trump, support rapidly increased. As of January 2026, 46% support abolishing ICE, while 43% oppose abolition.

Support for ICE's tactics and overall operations has also significantly decreased. A January 2026 YouGov poll conducted hours before the killing of Renée Good found that 52% of Americans disapproved of ICE and 39% approved. A majority of Americans also believe ICE's tactics are too forceful, with just 10% saying tactics are not forceful enough. 44% of Americans supported protests against ICE, with 42% opposed. In response to militarized ICE raids shortly after the beginning of Trump's second presidency, protests against mass deportations followed in June 2025, especially in Los Angeles, moving it "from activist circles to mainstream political debate."

== Reactions ==
Trump has accused Democrats of advocating for the abolition of ICE, saying that if "you get rid of ICE, you're going to have a country that you're going to be afraid to walk out of your house." He predicted that Democrats would get "beaten so badly" in the 2018 midterm elections because of the issue (the Democrats gained control of the House, but Republicans expanded their majority in the Senate in the elections). Then-Vice President Mike Pence visited ICE's headquarters in the wake of the controversy, calling ICE and Border Patrol agents "heroes."

Many Democratic politicians, such as Senator Amy Klobuchar of Minnesota and former Vice President Kamala Harris of California, believe that ICE should be reformed rather than abolished. Harris said that Democrats should "critically reexamine ICE" and "think about starting from scratch" with immigration policy, while Senator Bernie Sanders said that Democrats should instead encourage Trump to work with them on "a national program which deals with this serious issue."

National polling by the Pew Research Center in July 2018 found that ICE was one of the least popular government agencies. The same poll found that public support of the agency was sharply partisan: 72% of Democrats held an unfavorable view of the agency while 72% of Republicans were found to have a "favorable opinion" of it. A June 2025 Pew survey reported that 54% of Americans disapproved of ICE's increased workplace raids. A July 2025 Quinnipac University poll found that 57% of voters disapproved of how ICE was enforcing immigration laws and 64% disapproved of deporting people to third countries. NPR/PBS found that 54% of adults thought ICE had "gone too far", while CNN found that 53% of Americans opposed the expanded funding for ICE provisions in the One Big Beautiful Bill Act.

Polling by POLITICO/Morning Consult in July 2018 found that 25% of Americans favored abolishing ICE while a majority supported keeping it. In August 2018, polling by the Associated Press-NORC Center for Public Affairs Research found that 37% of Americans held an unfavorable opinion of ICE. The same poll found that 24% of Americans supported abolishing it. In January 2026, polling by The Economist/YouGov shortly after the killing of Renée Good found that 46% of Americans supported abolishing ICE, while 43% opposed. Commentators have noted that U.S. Customs and Border Protection (CBP), not ICE, is responsible for border enforcement, so abolishing ICE alone would not end the United States' ability to enforce its immigration laws, nor would it necessarily end the controversial practice of family separation that spurred support for the movement.

== See also ==
- 2025 Alvarado ICE facility incident
- 2025 Dallas ICE facility shooting
- 2025 United States protests against mass deportation
- Deaths, detentions and deportations of American citizens in the second Trump administration
- "Defund the police"
- Electronic monitoring in the United States
- ICE List
- No one is illegal
- Police abolition movement
- Police brutality
- United States Department of Homeland Security § Calls for abolition
- U.S. Immigration and Customs Enforcement § Protests and criticism
