= Mark T. Pittman =

American judge (born 1975)

Mark Pittman
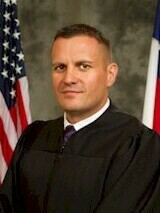

Judge of the United States District Court for the Northern District of Texas
- Incumbent
- Assumed office August 5, 2019
- Appointed by: Donald Trump
- Preceded by: John H. McBryde

Justice of the Texas Second Court of Appeals
- In office January 6, 2017 – August 5, 2019
- Appointed by: Greg Abbott
- Preceded by: Lee Ann Dauphinot
- Succeeded by: Mike Wallach

Judge of the 352nd Civil Court for Tarrant County
- In office January 8, 2015 – January 6, 2017
- Appointed by: Rick Perry
- Preceded by: Bonnie Sudderth
- Succeeded by: Josh Burgess

Personal details
- Born: Mark Timothy Pittman; 1975 (age 50–51) Big Spring, Texas, U.S.
- Education: Texas A&M University (BA); University of Texas at Austin (JD)

Mark Timothy Pittman (born 1975) is a United States district judge of the United States District Court for the Northern District of Texas and former judge of the Texas Court of Appeals. He was appointed by President Donald Trump in 2019.

== Early life and education ==
Pittman was born in Big Spring, Texas. He received his Bachelor of Arts, magna cum laude, in political science from Texas A&M University and his Juris Doctor from The University of Texas School of Law.

== Legal career ==
After graduating from law school, Pittman clerked for Judge Eldon Brooks Mahon of the United States District Court for the Northern District of Texas. He then worked as an associate at Kelly, Hart & Hallman LLP in Fort Worth. From 2004 to 2007, Pittman was a trial attorney in the Commercial Litigation Branch of the United States Department of Justice Civil Division. Pittman then served as an Assistant United States Attorney for the Northern District of Texas. Pittman later worked as a Senior Attorney at the Federal Deposit Insurance Corporation. Before becoming a judge, Pittman was an enforcement attorney with the United States Securities and Exchange Commission in Fort Worth.

== Judicial career ==
=== State judicial service ===
Pittman was a judge on the State's 352nd District Court, based in Tarrant County. In 2017, he was appointed by Texas Governor Greg Abbott to be a justice of Texas's Second Court of Appeals. He served in that capacity until he was appointed a federal judge in 2019.

=== Federal judicial service ===
On January 16, 2019, President Donald Trump announced his intent to nominate Pittman to serve as a United States district judge for the United States District Court for the Northern District of Texas. On January 17, 2019, his nomination was sent to the Senate. President Trump nominated Pittman to a seat vacated by John H. McBryde, who assumed senior status on October 9, 2018. On March 5, 2019, a hearing on his nomination was held before the Senate Judiciary Committee. On April 4, 2019, his nomination was reported out of committee by a 12–10 vote. On July 30, 2019, the Senate invoked cloture on his nomination by a 54–34 vote. On July 31, 2019, his nomination was confirmed by a 54–36 vote. He received his judicial commission on August 5, 2019. He was sworn into office on August 8, 2019.

=== Notable rulings ===
On November 8, 2021, Pittman ruled that United Airlines could impose a COVID-19 vaccine mandate on its employees while only providing unpaid leave for exempted workers.

On January 6, 2022, Pittman ordered the U.S. Food and Drug Administration (FDA) to review, redact, and release data submitted by COVID-19 vaccine manufacturer Pfizer for authorized use of the vaccine at an unprecedented rate. The data came from a Freedom of Information Act request submitted to FDA for documents beyond what was already publicly available on FDA's website as part of the approved vaccine's Action Package. Although the pace of the scheduling order required FDA to hire an additional team of contractors and expend roughly $5 million solely to comply with this FOIA request, Pittman ordered FDA to release documents at a faster pace, including at least 55,000 pages some months and at least 80,000 pages other months.

In January 2022, Pittman granted BNSF Railway's request for a preliminary injunction blocking railroad unions from striking while the dispute over the company's new "Hi Viz" availability policy was ongoing. He concluded that BNSF was likely to prevail and that a strike would cause irreparable harm to the company and public at large by disrupting supply chains.

On November 10, 2022, Pittman ruled that the Biden administration did not have the authority to forgive student loan debt through executive action through the HEROES Act.

In December 2022, Pittman ruled that Texas's law banning people from 18 to 20 years of age from carrying concealed handguns was unconstitutional in light of New York State Rifle & Pistol Association, Inc. v. Bruen.

In March 2024, Pittman ruled that the Minority Business Development Agency was wrong to consider historic discrimination based on race in its operations, citing Students for Fair Admissions v. Harvard.

In July 2024, Pittman ruled that Federal laws banning people from privately possessing alcohol stills inside their homes (26 U.S.C. § 5178(a)(1)(B)) or privately operating alcohol stills inside their homes (26 U.S.C. § 5601(6)) were unconstitutional because enacting these laws was not within the scope of Congress’ constitutionally enumerated powers.

In June 2026, Pittman issued a series of harsh sentences to eight defendants involved in an incident at the Prairieland ICE detention center on July 4, 2025. Sentences ranged from 30 years to 100 years after the defendants were classified as terrorists under the Patriot Act, and their sentences were to be served consecutively on multiple charges. The charges and sentencing are considered to be excessive by some observers considering that none of the defendants had a prior criminal record.

== Memberships ==
He is a member of the State Bar of Texas, Tarrant County Bar Association, Texas Bar Foundation, and the American Judges Association. He is vice president and a founding member of the Tarrant County Federalist Society.

Legal offices
Preceded by John H. McBryde	Judge of the United States District Court for the Northern District of Texas; 2019–present	Incumbent
