= Subpoena =

Writ to compel testimony or the yielding of evidence

A subpoena (/səˈpiː.nə/; also subpena, subpœna) or witness summons is a writ issued by a government agency, most often a court, to compel testimony by a witness or production of evidence under a penalty for failure. There are two common types of subpoenas:

1. subpoena ad testificandum orders a person to testify before the ordering authority or face punishment.
2. subpoena duces tecum orders a person or organization to bring physical evidence before the ordering authority or face punishment. This is often used for requests to mail copies of documents to a requesting party or directly to a court.

== Etymology ==
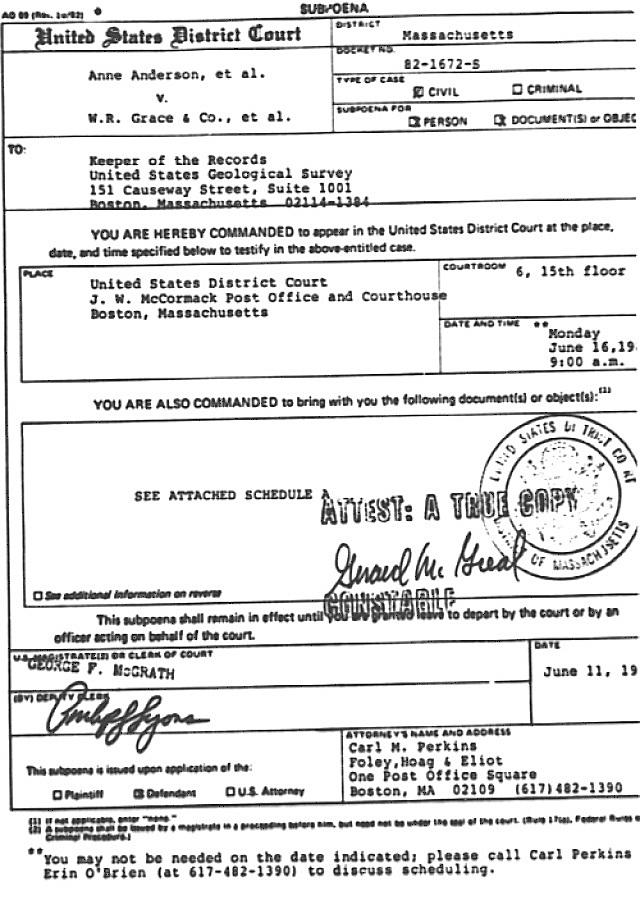
Example of subpoena in the case Anderson v. Cryovac

The term subpoena is from the Middle English suppena and the Latin phrase sub poena meaning "under penalty". It is also spelled "subpena". The subpoena has its source in English common law and it is now used almost with universal application throughout the English common law world. John Waltham, Bishop of Salisbury, is said to have created the writ of subpoena during the reign of Richard II. However, for civil proceedings in England and Wales, it is now described as a witness summons, as part of reforms to replace Latin terms with Plain English understandable to the layman.

== Process ==
=== Australia ===
In New South Wales, a court may set aside the whole, or part, of a subpoena on the basis that it is a "fishing expedition". In Lowery v Insurance Australia Ltd, the NSW Court of Appeal held that where documents requested in the schedule of a subpoena are deemed to have no relevance to the proceedings in dispute, the subpoena may be set aside as it has no legitimate forensic purpose. It was also held that it was not the role of the Court to redraft the subpoena and narrow its scope to those issues in dispute. In Victoria a subpoena is usually issued by a court registry officer, and does not require leave of the court.

=== United States ===
==== Judicial subpoena ====
Judicial subpoenas are federal court or state court orders to produce records or testimony. They are usually issued by the clerk of the court in the name of the judge presiding over the case. Additionally, court rules may permit lawyers to issue subpoenas themselves in their capacity as officers of the court. Typically subpoenas are issued "in blank" and it is the responsibility of the lawyer representing the party (plaintiff or defendant) on whose behalf the testimony is to be given to serve the subpoena on the witness. If a witness is reluctant to testify, then the personal service of subpoena is usually required with proof of service by non-party server.

The subpoena will usually be on the letterhead of the court where the case is filed, name the parties to the case, and be addressed by name to the person whose testimony is being sought. It will contain the language "You are hereby commanded to report in person to the clerk of this court" or similar, describing the specific location, scheduled date and time of the appearance. Some issuing jurisdictions include an admonishment advising the subject of the criminal penalty for failure to comply with a subpoena, and reminding him or her not to leave the court facilities until excused by a competent authority, often ending with the archaic threat "Fail not at your peril." In some situations, the person having to testify or produce documents is paid.

Pro se litigants who represent themselves, unlike lawyers, must ask a court clerk to officially issue them subpoena forms when they need to call witnesses by phone or in person, or when they need to officially request documents to be sent to them or directly to court. Any documents that have not been subpoenaed to court or verified by a witness may be dismissed by the opposite party as hearsay, unless excepted by hearsay rules or permitted by the judge. If the witness is called via long-distance phone call, then the requesting party is responsible for initiating the call and providing a payment with a prepaid phone card. Most states (including California) have further restrictions on subpoena use in criminal cases.

Some states (as is the case in Florida) require the subpoenaing party to first file a Notice of Intent to Serve Subpoena, or a Notice of Production from Non-Party ten days prior to issuing the subpoena, so that the other party may have ample time to file any objections.

Also, the party being subpoenaed has the right to object to the issuance of the subpoena, if it is for an improper purpose, such as subpoenaing records that have no relevance to the proceedings, or subpoenaing persons who would have no evidence to present, or subpoenaing records or testimony that is confidential or privileged.

The subpoena power of any state court in the United States generally ends at that state's border. Consequently, lacking any powers outside the state's border, state prosecutors and defense attorneys in a state criminal case cannot use the same procedures that they would use to obtain a subpoena for an out-of-state witness that they would for an in-state witness. Instead, they can use the processes defined by the Uniform Law to Secure the Attendance of Witnesses from Within or Without a State in Criminal Proceedings.

==== Administrative subpoena ====
Many U.S. federal agencies can issue administrative subpoenas without prior judicial oversight.

==== Grand jury subpoena ====
As part of their investigations, a grand jury can subpoena witnesses to testify.

==== Congressional subpoena ====
Standing committees in both houses of the United States Congress have the authority to send out subpoenas for legitimate lawmaking and investigation purposes. This compels the production of testimony or records. Failure to respond constitutes contempt of Congress.

==== Exceptions ====
There are several exceptions to being required to testify in court, including the following examples:

- Fifth Amendment – Under the Fifth Amendment to the United States Constitution, no person shall be compelled to be a witness against themselves. Witnesses cannot be forced to testify if the testimony may incriminate them. This right can, however, be set aside if the witness is granted immunity. This immunity allows them to testify, and makes them immune to prosecution for any crimes they confess to.
- Spousal privilege – In most cases, a person cannot be compelled to testify against their spouse. Exceptions to this rule include domestic violence or sexual abuse cases.
- Priest–penitent privilege – Communication with a counselor or priest is considered privileged, because both jobs require that clients be free to express themselves completely honestly, without fear of consequences.
- Attorney–client privilege – In order to provide competent legal advice, clients must be free to express all details to their lawyer. Communication with a lawyer is protected, and a lawyer cannot be forced to testify against a client.
- Physician–patient privilege – Medical professionals are forbidden from disclosing a patient's private medical information without the patient's permission, under the law of patient confidentiality. A doctor cannot provide testimony based upon the patient's private medical information, and a doctor cannot be compelled to disclose medical records.
- Diplomatic immunity – Foreign diplomats cannot be forced to testify in court.
- Competence – A witness may have memory or other cognitive deficits, which could affect their ability to truthfully recall events. They also may not be physically fit to appear in court.

== "Friendly subpoena" ==
A "friendly subpoena" is a subpoena that is issued to an individual or entity who might otherwise testify or submit evidence willingly without a subpoena, but is prevented from doing so due to a higher order legal, ethical or regulatory loyalty, or fiduciary responsibility, which can only be superseded by a subpoena. It is called a "friendly" subpoena because the recipient would otherwise be or is very likely to be willing to cooperate with the investigation at issue, once issued a subpoena.

== Conduct money ==
Conduct money is money paid in some legal systems to a person under the compulsion of a subpoena to pay for their expenses to attend in court. It generally incorporates a daily rate for each day the witness must attend in court (with a one-day minimum), plus a travel allowance to allow the witness to get to the place of the hearing. Generally, conduct money must be delivered with the summons for it to have legal effect. In some jurisdictions, however, failure to provide conduct money at the time the summons is served is only an irregularity but not fatal to the validity of the summons. Witnesses are generally entitled to additional conduct money if their attendance is required on more days than anticipated. Moreover, witnesses who are required to make an overnight stay to attend in court on more than one day are generally entitled to an allowance for accommodation and meals.

The rates for travel, daily attendance, accommodation, and meals are generally set under a court tariff, and are fixed for all witnesses. A witness may not refuse to appear merely because they believe the conduct money is insufficient to make up for their lost wages or actual travel expenses. Witnesses may be paid more, but the additional cost cannot be claimed against the losing party – only the tariff amount can be recovered.

Occasionally, special witnesses, such as experts, may be entitled to receive conduct money under a higher tariff. As an example, in the Canadian province of Ontario, witnesses in civil proceedings in the Superior Court are allowed a daily rate of 50.00 CAD. The travel allowance is $3.00 if the witness resides in the same city as the hearing; 24 cents per kilometre each way if the hearing is within 400 km (approx. 240 miles); or open ticket coach class airfare, plus 24 cents per kilometre to the nearest airport to both the witness and the place of hearing if the distance is over 400 km. The accommodation and meal allowance is $75.00 per overnight stay for anyone travelling more than a certain distance from the hearing.

== See also ==
- Emergency data request
- Indictment
- Summons
