= Noise demonstration =

Form of protest

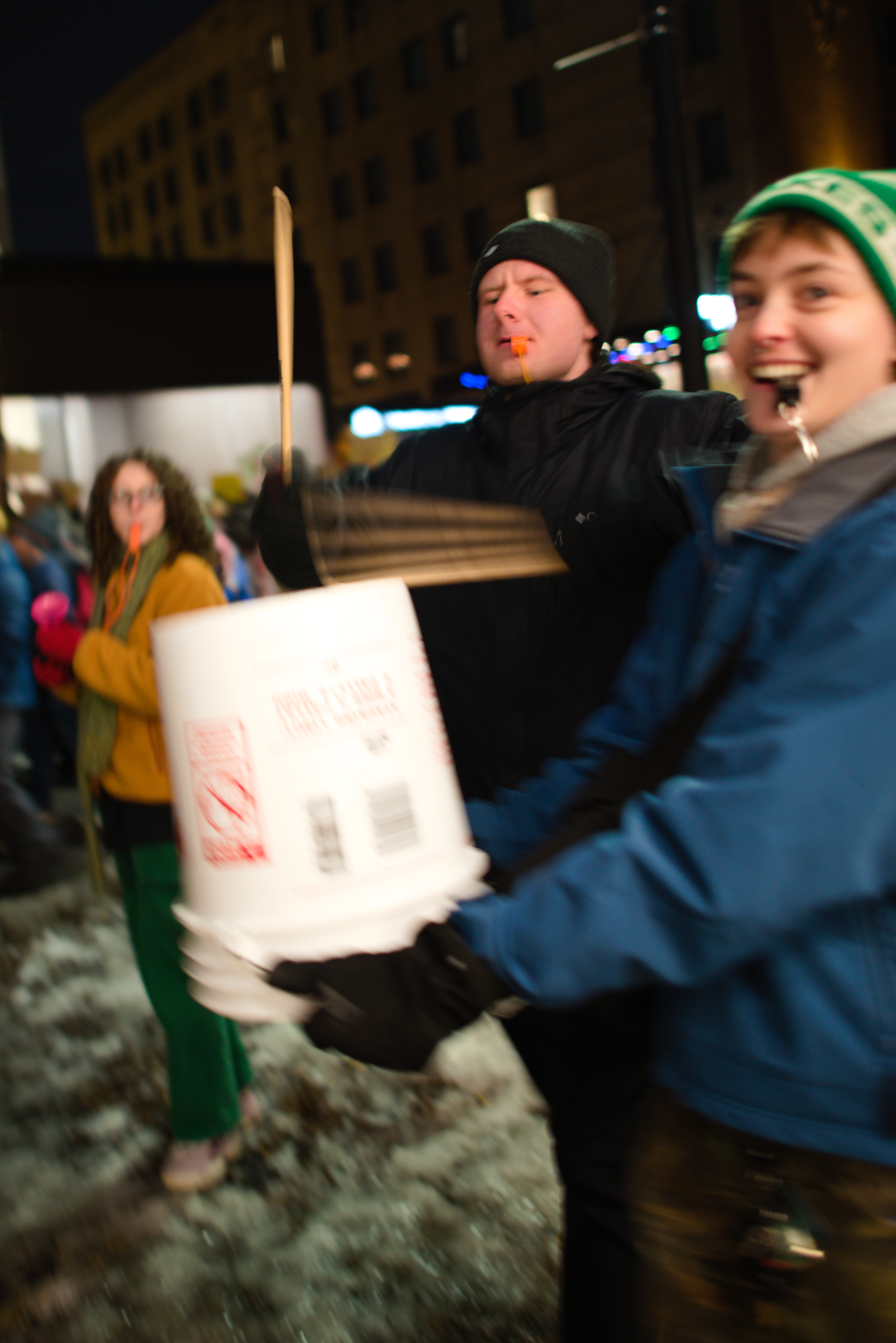
Anti-ICE protesters in Minneapolis in January 2026 blowing whistles and using a bucket as a drum.

A noise demonstration is a type of nonviolent, disruptive protest that involves participants making noise with instruments, voices, megaphones, or improvised tools like frying pans.

== Examples ==
=== United States ===
In the United States, noise demonstrations have been used outside police departments and prisons, as well as outside events such as political rallies or campaign events. In 2020, a noise demonstration was held outside the White House to disrupt a speech by President Donald Trump.

Noise demonstrations have been utilized in the 2025-2026 protests against mass deportation during the second Trump administration. Some protesters use whistles to alert other of the presence of Immigration and Customs Enforcement (ICE) agents or the occurrence of abductions by such agents. Noise demonstrations have also been held outside federal buildings and hotels housing ICE agents.

== Goals ==
There are multiple purposes to a noise demonstration and they can blend and overlap. Some goals include breaking isolation, disrupting business, waking oppressors up, resisting censorship, sharing joy, and building on-the-ground resistance connections.

If someone is captured, imprisoned, or stuck behind a border, it is possible to make enough noise that they can hear it and know there are people on the outside who care about them. Some noise demonstrations are done outside jails or prisons to show solidarity.

A key element of successful noise demonstrations is that they become impossible to ignore. Many people or systems being protested are resistant to mild protest and rely on silence or complacency. Some gatherings gain protestors from uninvolved bystanders.

== Notable instances ==
Several defendants in the 2025 Alvarado ICE facility incident—during which an Alvarado, Texas, police officer was shot—said they believed they were attending a noise demonstration and that they had no knowledge of any planned violence. The protesters were subsequently accused of membership in "antifa", which United States Attorney General Pam Bondi characterized as a "left wing terrorist organization". In October 2025, several protesters pleaded guilty to federal charges of providing material support to terrorism.

== See also ==
- Cacerolazo
- Charivari
