= 2025 Prairieland ICE detention center incident =

Civil disturbance in Alvarado, Texas, US

- Part of Protests against mass deportation during the second Trump administration
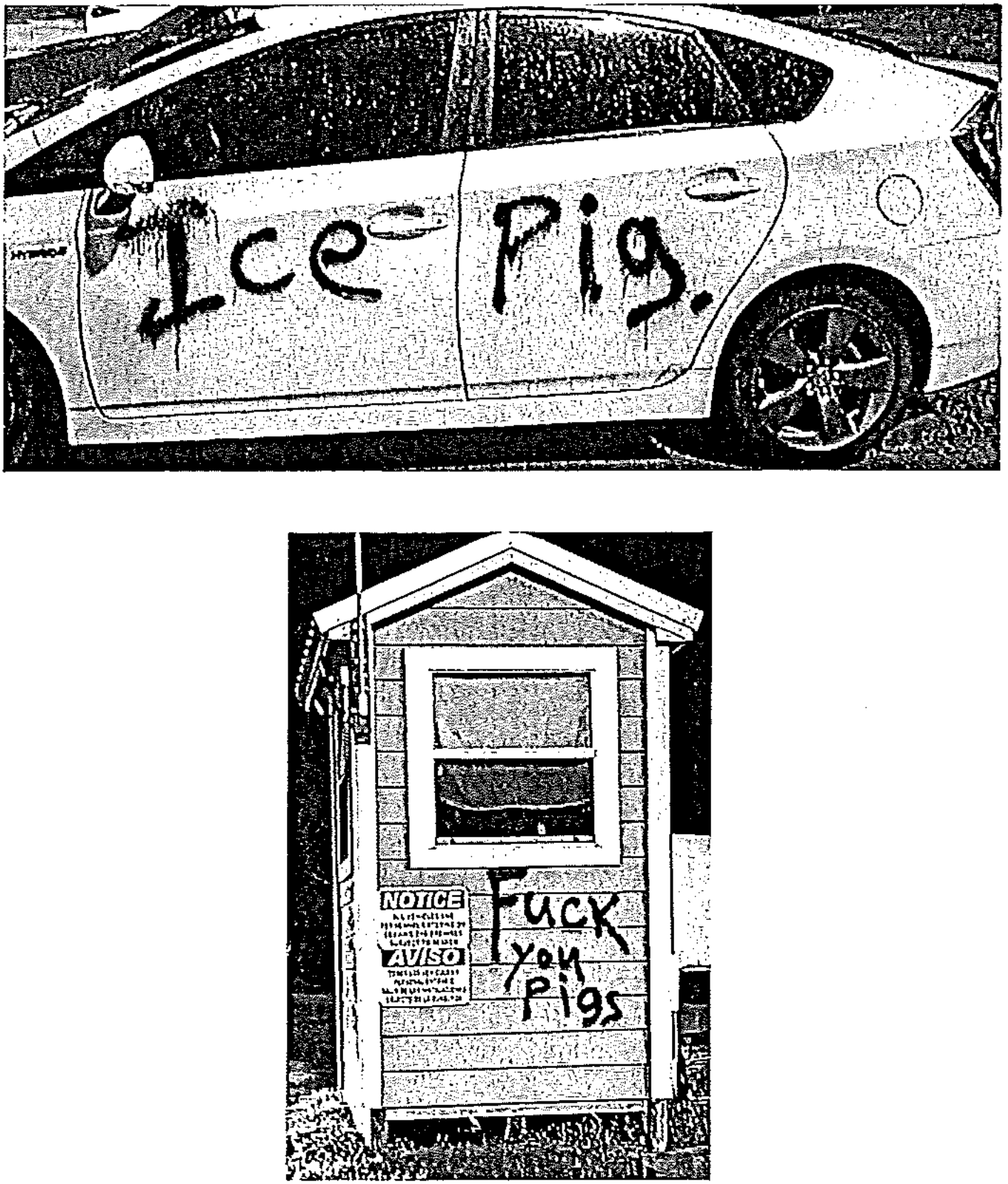
- Images from a criminal complaint. A car and a guard hut vandalized by protesters.
- Date: July 4, 2025 ca 10:37–11:05 pm CDT (UTC−05:00)
- Location: Alvarado, Texas, United States; 32.4212°N 97.1955°W
- Caused by: Opposition to ICE
- Methods: Protest, vandalism, shooting

Parties
Anti-ICE protesters	ICE; Alvarado Police Department

Casualties
- Injuries: 1 (Alvarado police officer)
- Arrested: 11 protesters, including driver not present during shooting; 11 non-protesters not at the scene
- Convictions: See section

On the evening of July 4, 2025, a civil disturbance and shooting occurred at the Immigration and Customs Enforcement (ICE) Prairieland Detention Center in Alvarado, Texas, United States, during one of a series of protests against mass deportations and mass incarcerations carried out during Donald Trump's second presidency. After executive directives from Trump, the US Department of Justice (DOJ) accused protesters and their associates of domestic terrorism; several were convicted of providing material support for terrorism and given decades-long prison sentences.

The protesters gathered at the center around 10:37 p.m.; several arrived in a van which subsequently drove away. The remaining protesters split into small groups; some set off fireworks near detention center buildings while others committed acts of vandalism. (Note: Multiple sources. Early reports are unclear about the number of protesters present.) ICE called local police; when they arrived, Lieutenant Thomas Gross of the Alvarado police pointed his pistol at two people running away from him, one of whom had a rifle. Another protester, Benjamin Hanil Song of Dallas, fired several rifle shots at three police officers; one shot struck Gross above his collarbone and exited near his spine. Gross returned fire as the protesters scattered and fled. He sustained non-life-threatening injuries and was released from a hospital within hours. Eleven individuals were arrested within a few days; within a month, Song was arrested after a manhunt, and five others were arrested.

Song and others were initially charged with attempted murder. In September 2025, following the assassination of Charlie Kirk, Trump signed an executive order designating the anti-fascist political movement antifa as a domestic terror organization, followed by NSPM-7, which instructed federal agencies to "investigate and disrupt [domestic] networks, entities, and organizations that foment political violence". In October, the DOJ charged two suspects with terrorism, the first time it had charged anyone with terrorism in connection with antifa. In November, a new federal indictment charged other defendants with providing material support for terrorism and said they were "operatives" in a "North Texas Antifa Cell". In late 2025 and early 2026, five more people connected with the event were arrested or indicted on state charges, bringing the number of accused to 22.

In November 2025, seven defendants pled guilty to federal charges of providing material support for terrorism or damaging property. In February 2026, the federal trial of nine defendants began, but U.S. District Judge Mark T. Pittman declared a mistrial. A new trial commenced days later, and in March, all nine were convicted. In June, seven were given federal prison sentences between 30 and 70 years, and Song was sentenced to 100 years—the maximum sentences allowable under federal sentencing guidelines. Attorneys for four of the convicts said they were filing appeals. Nine others were sentenced in early July, five of whom received reduced sentences for helping law enforcement or prosecutors.

Defendants and their supporters said the protesters were attending a peaceful noise demonstration and denied planning violence. They also dispute the alleged ties to antifa. At the federal trial, two cooperating defendants disclaimed earlier statements saying the others were part of antifa; one of the pair testified that she had not understood what "antifa cell" meant when she signed a guilty plea that used the term. Commentators have criticized the government for arresting and charging suspects for transporting antifascist zines or wearing black bloc clothing, arguing that that it could have a chilling effect by creating a precedent for prosecuting activists exercising their free speech rights who are associated with activities the government declares to be terrorism.

== Background ==
=== Deportation under the second Trump administration and protest ===
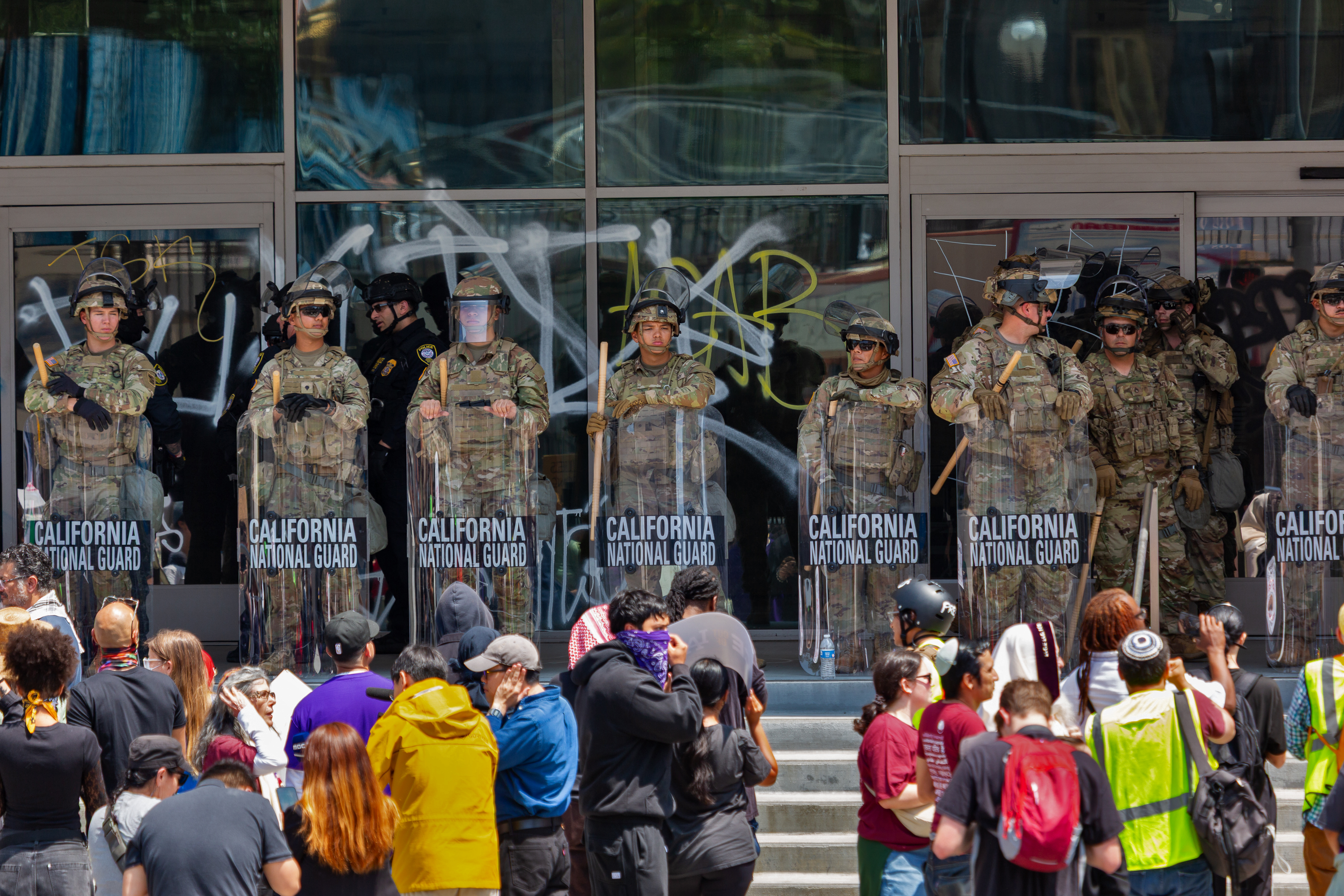
California National Guard with riot shields at June 2025 Los Angeles protests against ICE and mass deportation

During the second administration of Donald Trump, the federal government of the United States has pursued an aggressive immigrant deportation campaign, including forced detention and deportation of individuals from the United States. The main entity behind these mass deportations has been US Immigration and Customs Enforcement (ICE), which became the largest and most well-funded US federal law enforcement agency with the 2025 One Big Beautiful Bill Act.

These immigration policies have been controversial and widely criticized, with calls to abolish ICE. Protests against mass deportation during the second Trump administration led to domestic military deployments in Los Angeles in June.

=== Designation of antifa and leftist activism as domestic terrorism ===
After the September 10 assassination of right-wing political activist Charlie Kirk, White House deputy chief of staff Stephen Miller spoke of an "organized campaign that led to this assassination", describing it as a "vast domestic terror movement" that the federal government would pursue with "every resource we have at the Department of Justice, Homeland Security, and throughout this government to identify, disrupt, dismantle and destroy these networks."

On September 22, Donald Trump signed an executive order designating the anti-fascist political movement antifa as a domestic terror organization. On September 25, Trump signed National Security Presidential Memorandum 7 (NSPM-7), which directed agencies to work with local law enforcement and prioritize investigations into what it described as networks associated with politically motivated violence. It characterized these networks as ideologically motivated by "anti-Americanism, anti-capitalism, and anti-Christianity" as well as "extremism on migration, race, and gender" and animosity to "traditional American views."

== Sequence of events ==
Law enforcement statements and court filings state that, prior to the incident, several defendants participated in a group chat on Signal named "4th of July Party!" and decided to bring fireworks, firearms, and medical kits. Two participants surveilled the detention center and forwarded information about security measures and the location of the nearest police station. Autumn Hill (Note: Also known as Cameron Arnold.) and Meagan Morris (Note: Also known as Bradford Morris.) lived at a large brick home in Oak Cliff nicknamed the "Big Gay House" that served as a gathering place for local left-wing activists. On July 3, several chat members met there; prosecutors allege that they planned violence, but the protesters contend that they met to make carpooling arrangements and conduct a "gear check".

An attendee at the gear check was Benjamin Hanil Song, a 32-year-old male (Note: Song is genderfluid and uses "any/all" pronouns. "He/him" is used for narrative coherence and consistency between sources.) former US Marine Corps reservist. Song often assumed a leadership role in local leftist protests. He was active in the Socialist Rifle Association (SRA) and conducted firearms training seminars at the Big Gay House for the benefit of other local activists. Susan Kent—an SRA member who attended the gear check but not the protest and who later cooperated with prosecutors—said that Hill asked Song during the gear check whether he intended to bring guns; his response according to Kent—"Yes, I'm not getting arrested"—would later become a focal point for prosecutors.

On the evening of July 4, several protesters met at the house to carpool. The group chat had numerous members who did not participate in the carpool or gear check, and members used cryptic pseudonyms, so no one knew for certain who might show up or who all the chat members were. Eleven protesters gathered near the Prairieland Detention Center at 10:37 pm, several dressed in black "military-style" or black bloc clothing with their faces covered. Not all of the protesters wore black clothing; some wore T-shirts, shorts, tank tops, or baseball jerseys. Joy Gibson and Song showed up in neon-colored face masks because they could not find black ones. The carpoolers reported being surprised by an unfamiliar vehicle driven by a young blond man they did not recognize, Nathan "Nate" Baumann, who verified his identity with his group chat pseudonym. Baumann brought spray paint, which had not been prearranged. Savanna (Note: Spelled "Savannah" in some sources. Official documents from the federal trial and later sources use "Savanna".) Batten and a married couple, Elizabeth and Ines Soto, also arrived in a separate vehicle. Someone removed a wagon filled with fireworks from a vehicle and pushed it towards the detention center.

Law enforcement officials said the protesters conducted a "diversion" to draw ICE officers out into the open; fireworks were set off, the group split up into several smaller groups, and two protesters spray-painted vehicles and a guard structure with slogans including "Ice pig" and "traitor". The vandals also slashed a van's tires and disabled a security camera. Baumann was one of the vandals; he initially identified the second vandal as Seth Sikes, but later said it was Zachary Evetts. One small group remained near the facility entrance, apparently keeping watch. ICE officers called 911 to report the incident to local law enforcement. Two ICE officers emerged from the compound at 10:58 pm; according to law enforcement officials at a July press conference, the ICE officers were unarmed. Some protesters tossed small fireworks towards the detention center buildings; the FBI's lead investigatory agent later testified that the fireworks caused no measurable damage. One ICE officer told a group of protesters they had to leave; the officer testified that the group appeared to comply and began walking towards the vehicles.

Alvarado police arrived at 10:59 pm, and a protester in a green mask north of the nearby street intersection appeared to signal to the others using a flashlight. According to prosecutors, body camera footage from Alvarado police lieutenant Thomas Gross captures audio of someone saying "get to the rifles" before Gross orders the protesters to stop and get on the ground. Gross drew his pistol and pointed it at two people running away from him—later identified as an unnamed ICE officer chasing the second vandal, either Evetts or Sikes. The vandal ran behind a tree and Gross shifted his attention to the more distant protester in the green mask, who then fired shots in his direction. Two federal officers ran for cover. One of the shots entered the front of Gross's neck above his collarbone, injured his trapezius, and exited from his upper back. He fired three shots at the gunman. After telling another officer which way the protesters went, he was driven to a nearby parking lot and airlifted to a hospital. Initial court filings were inconsistent about the number of shooters and shots fired, saying that one or more shooters fired up to 30 shots, but later filings say that a single shooter fired 11 shots before their gun jammed. Prosecutors said the gunman in the green mask fired first. In late 2025 hearings, there was conflicting testimony regarding who fired first. According to Mark Pittman, one of the judges at trial, the gunfire ended when Song's rifle was struck by a "miracle bullet" fired by Gross. Gross's injuries did not threaten any vital organs, and he was released from a hospital within a few hours after receiving treatment.

Law enforcement recovered "AR-15 style" rifles, 12 sets of body armor, two-way radios, spray paint masks, and flyers with slogans ("Fight ICE terror with class war", "Free all political prisoners"). Batten, Baumann, Gibson, Maricela Rueda, Sikes, and the Sotos were arrested at a nearby intersection, while Evetts was arrested several hours later on foot in Venus, about 3 miles (4.8 km) away. A van seen leaving the scene was pulled over by a Johnson County detective, and the driver, Morris, admitted to transporting people to the detention center to "make some noise". Two AR-15 style rifles, two ballistic vests, a handgun, and a ballistic helmet were found in the van; Morris was arrested and jailed. Morris told the KERA (FM) radio station that she had been parked 1/2 mile (0.8 km) from the detention center and that she never exited the vehicle during the incident. One suspect had at least two cellphones inside a Faraday bag. A flag saying "Resist Fascism. Fight Oligarchy" was recovered.

A total of eleven guns were recovered; several were found in suspects' cars, disassembled in their backpacks, or left in the wagon by the detention center entrance. All of the guns found by law enforcement were legally owned by the suspects. According to n+1, most of the protesters who brought guns did so in anticipation of an armed counter-protest, but because none materialized, those other than Song did not carry guns during the event.

== Investigation and subsequent arrests ==
Hill, who had attended the protest, was arrested the next day when police served a search warrant at the Big Gay House. Song was arrested by federal authorities on July 15 after a manhunt. Authorities identified the Song as a shooter, and said he purchased one AR-15 style rifle found where the shots were fired. They said that the rifle had a binary trigger to allow rapid fire, which they described as a probable modification done after purchase. He purchased four of the guns recovered in the investigation, according to the U.S. Attorney's Office.

According to chat logs, on July 5, Song changed his username on the online chats to "DELETE" to indicate he wanted to be removed; John Phillip Thomas, the chat administrator, did so. Thomas was arrested for helping him evade capture; Rebecca Morgan was also arrested for hindering the prosecution of terrorism. According to court records, Song evaded arrest immediately after the incident by hiding in a sunflower field several hundred yards from the detention center, where cell phone records indicate that his phone was stationary for almost 24 hours. On July 6, he sent Lynette Sharp a satellite view of what prosecutors said was a suggested pickup spot in Alvarado, after which his cell phone signals ceased permanently. Chat logs indicate that Kent, Sharp and Janette Goering (an SRA member who knew Song) rented two rooms at a Cleburne hotel to plan how to help him escape, and then contacted Thomas; evidence indicates Thomas met Song and accompanied him to a Walmart store to buy new clothing before a planned meeting to hand off Song to Morgan. Police subsequently served a warrant on Thomas's home in Dallas; police said that Thomas initially denied knowing Song, but later admitted they formerly lived together.

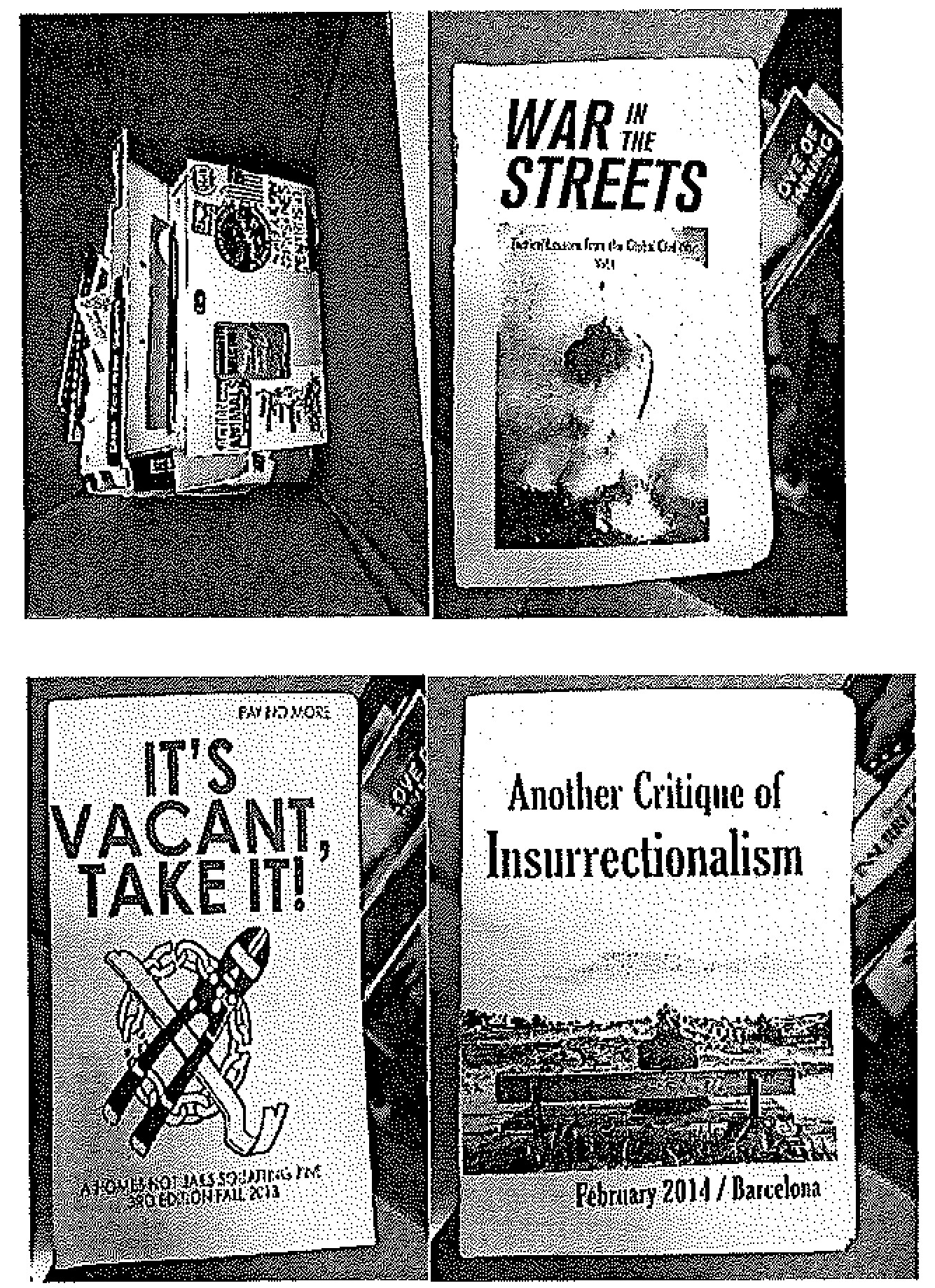
Literature seized from the Denton apartment

Rueda called her mother from jail and asked her to contact Rueda's husband, Daniel Sanchez Estrada; (Note: Also known as Des Sanchez. The composite surname Sanchez Estrada follows Spanish naming customs; Sanchez is the father's surname, which is typically used predominantly, and Estrada is the mother's surname, which is typically added only in formal settings.) when he responded, Rueda asked him to "move whatever you need to from the house". FBI agents monitored Sanchez Estrada as he arrived at his Garland house, removed several packages, and dropped off a box at a Denton apartment. Federal agents subsequently raided the apartment, discovering anti-government and anarchist documents, largely pamphlets and zines, in what appeared to be the box seen earlier. On July 7, Sanchez Estrada was arrested in Denton and charged with tampering with evidence and conspiring to tamper with evidence. The renter of the apartment was not arrested or charged.

Dario Sanchez, a Dallas teacher and SRA member, was arrested on July 15 on state charges for allegedly removing Thomas from group chats. He was released on bond but was subsequently arrested two more times, once for deleting messages from the Signal and Discord messaging apps, and again for what officials describe as an attempt to modify a Nintendo Game Boy as a remote triggering device for explosives. Sanchez said that after his initial arrest, an FBI agent offered him a deal to avoid jail time if he allowed the FBI to impersonate him online, which he interpreted as "[the FBI] angling to try and scoop up other people for no good reason"; after telling the FBI that he would not cooperate until he was allowed to talk to an attorney, he says he was placed in solitary confinement for 30 days. Sanchez was ultimately released on bond; in an interview for a January 2026 story in The New Republic, he was wearing an ankle monitor, and said he had severely curtailed his online activity to avoid inadvertently viewing "violent" online content that could be interpreted as a violation of his bond agreement.

Prosecutors produced group chat logs showing that the participants had debated at length whether they should bring guns. Song wrote that "Cops are not trained or equipped for more than one rifle, so it tends to make them back off." Other chat participants argued that a noise demonstration was low risk and the assumptions about how police would respond were "way over the top".

On September 22, Batten, Gibson, Morgan, Rueda, Sharp and Elizabeth Soto were arraigned at the United States District Court for the Northern District of Texas in Fort Worth. Supporters of the women disputed conspiracy claims and said the women believed they were attending a peaceful protest. The following day, Baumann, Evetts, Hill, Morris, Sikes, Ines Soto, Thomas and Song were arraigned at the Fort Worth court. Sikes was ordered held in jail as a flight risk, but the others were released pending a preliminary detention hearing.

On October 21, Janette Goering, who allegedly helped Kent and Sharp with the hotel room, participated in group chats, and gave Song a Faraday bag she made, was arrested on a state charge of aiding in the commission of terrorism, bringing the total number of defendants to eighteen. Prosecutors allege Goering attended the gear check and gave Song the Faraday bag there; another witness denied that Goering was present, and Kent—who knew Goering—did not mention Goering in her testimony about the gear check. Goering asserts that she gave Song the bag months earlier.

On January 5, 2026, a nineteenth person was arrested in connection with the incident. She faces two counts of hindering prosecution of terrorism. Court documents reviewed by KERA the following week allege that she sent messages asking others to delete "digital evidence" and to remove the names of defendants from Signal chats.

In May 2026, three more people were indicted by a Johnson County grand jury on state charges of engaging in organized criminal activity and hindering the prosecution of terrorism, both first-degree felonies. The indictments brought the total number of people accused in the case to 22. The trio is alleged to have helped Song evade arrest, but court documents did not make their roles clear. Their case was scheduled to go to trial later in 2026.

Summary of arrests and indictments
Name	Date of arrest or indictment	Reason for arrest or indictment	Additional references
Savanna Batten	July 4, 2025	Present at detention center	
Nathan (a.k.a. Nate) Baumann	July 4, 2025	Present at detention center (Note: Pled guilty and acted as cooperating witness at federal trial.)	
Estes (Note: Not convicted and has not pled guilty; first name omitted for privacy reasons.)	May 28, 2026	Allegedly helped Song evade capture, trial pending	
Zachary Evetts	July 5, 2025	Present at detention center	
Fowlkes	January 5, 2026	Allegedly concealed evidence, trial pending	
Joy Gibson	July 4, 2025	Present at detention center	
Janette Goering	October 21, 2025	Allegedly concealed evidence, trial pending	
Autumn Hill	July 5, 2025	Present at detention center	
Susan Kent	August 7, 2025	Helped Song evade capture (admitted)	
Rebecca Morgan	July 13, 2025	Helped Song evade capture (convicted)	
Meagan Morris	July 4, 2025	Present at detention center (driver)	
Reyna	May 28, 2026	Allegedly helped Song evade capture, trial pending	
Maricela Rueda	July 4, 2025	Present at detention center	
Dario Sanchez	July 15, 2025	Allegedly concealed evidence, trial pending	
Daniel (a.k.a. Des) Sanchez Estrada	July 7, 2025	Concealed evidence (convicted)	
Lynette Sharp	July 13, 2025	Helped Song evade capture (admitted)	
Seth Sikes	July 4, 2025	Present at detention center	
Smith	May 28, 2026	Allegedly helped Song evade capture, trial pending	
Benjamin Hanil Song	July 15, 2025	Present at detention center (shooter)	
Elizabeth (a.k.a. Liz) Soto	July 4, 2025	Present at detention center	
Ines Soto	July 4, 2025	Present at detention center	
John Phillip Thomas	July 10, 2025	Helped Song evade capture (admitted)	

== Affiliations and ideology ==
Several defendants had previously participated in protest activism. Three had prior protest-related arrests but no convictions. Batten was arrested for criminal trespass for blocking a bank door at an "Occupy Dallas" protest in 2011 as part of the Occupy Wall Street movement (the case was dismissed), and again for blocking a Dallas highway as part of an anti-ICE protest in 2018 (the charge was dropped). Ines Soto was arrested and charged with evading arrest in 2016 for his actions while protesting a speech at Texas A&M University by Richard B. Spencer, a white supremacist. Song had participated in a Black Lives Matter street protest in Austin in 2020, where he reportedly aimed his rifle at two police officers after tripping during a fracas when an officer grabbed him from behind. He was charged with aggravated assault with a deadly weapon against a peace officer, a first-degree felony in Texas, but a grand jury declined to indict him.

Song was initially named but later dropped from a 2023 lawsuit by the New Columbia Movement, a Christian nationalist organization, alleging that he and other members of the Elm Fork chapter of the John Brown Gun Club (JBGC) unlawfully intimidated New Columbia members who were protesting a drag show where the JBGC was providing security. Song was not among those arrested at the incident. The JBGC chapter effectively ceased operations after the lawsuit.

Goering, Dario Sanchez, Song and Thomas were members of the Socialist Rifle Association (SRA); Rueda participated in SRA activities although she was not a member.

Batten, Elizabeth Soto and Ines Soto ran a local reading group called the "Emma Goldman Book Club", referring to the Russian-born anarchist revolutionary writer and activist, and maintained its account on Twitter. Sanchez Estrada co-founded the club but had stepped away about a decade earlier. The Sotos also maintained a separate Twitter (later X) account for "DFW Antifa". Federal prosecutors alleged that the book club was a front organization for antifa, and played a video of a street brawl at a protest that the organization posted online as evidence of antifa affiliation at trial.

Law-enforcement officers searched the Big Gay House and found guns, body armor, a printing press, a hoodie with "chinga la migra" on it, stickers with "be gay do crime" on them, and a drawing of Trump with a swastika.

== Trials ==
National Security Presidential Memorandum–7 (NSPM-7), which designates the anti-fascist movement antifa as a domestic terrorist organization, has been described as "Trump's new legal weapon for prosecuting protestors".

Song and others were initially charged with attempted murder. After the September 10 assassination of right-wing political activist Charlie Kirk, Trump signed National Security Presidential Memorandum 7 (NSPM-7), an executive order designating the anti-fascist political movement antifa as a domestic terror organization. On October 16, 2025, the United States Department of Justice (DOJ) charged two suspects with terrorism. In a social media post, United States Attorney General Pam Bondi said the two men were part of antifa, which she characterized as a "left-wing terrorist organization". In November, a new federal indictment labeled the Prairieland defendants as "operatives" in a "North Texas Antifa Cell" and added the charge of providing material support for terrorism.

On November 19, 2025, Baumann, Gibson, Sharp, Sikes and Thomas each entered a guilty plea to one count of providing material support for terrorism in federal court in Fort Worth. An attorney for Baumann said his client was only pleading guilty to damaging property. Prosecutors alleged that the defendants were members of the so-called "North Texas Antifa Cell", but attorneys for the defendants denied that such an organization ever existed, pointing to a lack of evidence presented by the government. Baumann and Gibson said that Song's role was to alert the other protesters if police arrived, and Sikes said that Song was armed only to intimidate law enforcement if necessary to allow the others to escape.

On November 24, Kent and Morgan pleaded guilty to federal charges of providing material support for terrorism, admitting to having helped the alleged gunman evade capture. Kent also pleaded not guilty to state charges of engaging in organized criminal activity and hindering the prosecution of terrorism; her trial was expected to start in March 2026.

On January 21, 2026, Judge Mark Pittman fined three defense attorneys $500 each for filing "frivolous" motions requesting more evidence from prosecutors. Among the evidence the attorneys requested was information about past investigations into local antifa organizations. According to an investigation by In These Times, a local FBI investigation was started during the first presidency of Donald Trump to look into "Antifa DFW" and several allegedly related organizations; (Note: The other organizations investigated by the FBI were the Dallas Workers Front, Dallas Antifa, Antifa Dallas, Dallas Antifascist and DFW Anti-Fascist League.) the FBI ultimately determined in 2018 that "No potential criminal violations or priority threats to national security warranting further investigation were identified". A spokesperson for the Dallas FBI field office told In These Times that the U.S. Attorney's Office had been aware of this outcome, but it was unclear if anyone directly connected to the prosecution had known about it, as there had been turnover in the office.

On February 17, Pittman declared a mistrial during voir dire in the Fort Worth trial of Batten, Evetts, Hill, Morris, Rueda, Sanchez Estrada, Song and Elizabeth and Ines Soto. The declaration was prompted by "civil rights messaging" on a T-shirt worn by a defense attorney under her blazer during jury selection. The Fort Worth Star-Telegram identified the attorney and wrote that her shirt displayed pictures of civil rights leaders Martin Luther King Jr. and Shirley Chisholm, which the judge said risked biasing jurors. The trial was subsequently rescheduled for February 23, 2026, with a new jury pool. Pittman said the attorney will face a hearing regarding possible sanctions. The New York Times later reported that Pittman halted the proceedings when the attorney asked the potential jurors a question about the legal right to protest and referenced the recent death of civil rights leader Jesse Jackson.

On February 23, jury selection was restarted at the Eldon B. Mahon United States Courthouse in Fort Worth with a new jury pool. Unlike the previous trial, the overflow courtroom was relocated to the Earle Cabell Federal Building and Courthouse in Dallas, and all spectators had to use the overflow courtroom. As many as four of the defendants who had previously pleaded guilty were expected to testify for the prosecution. In an unusual move, Pittman said he would question the potential jurors himself, rather than allowing the prosecutors and defense attorneys to do so. The defense moved to prohibit the prosecution from mentioning antifa, arguing that the term was prejudicial, but this was rejected by the judge. The charges do not require proving that the defendants were members of a designated terrorist organization. As federal law requires jury selection to be open to the public, concerns were raised about several interruptions in the video feed to the Dallas overflow courtroom, where the spectators and some members of the defense team were watching the proceedings; the judge ordered the feed turned off in some instances but it appeared to randomly drop out at other times.

On February 24, defense attorneys for Song cross-examined Gross, who admitted that before clearly seeing Song, he had drawn his pistol, a 9mm Glock, and pointed it at two people—later identified as a protester and an ICE officer—who were running away from his position. Gross testified that one of the runners had an AR-15 style rifle. According to the Star-Telegram, defense attorneys emphasized that Song fired only after seeing Gross draw his weapon to establish that Song did so to defend a third party—the fleeing protester. An ICE officer called as a witness also testified that Gross drew his pistol before Song fired. Gross characterized the events as a series of "split-second decisions" he made "without fully being able to evaluate the scene". An FBI agent testified that Gross's decision to draw his pistol was "extremely reasonable".

Eleven shell casings from Song's rifle and two casings from Gross's pistol were collected (Gross fired three shots), but the only bullet collected as evidence was the one that struck Gross. A defense attorney for Song asserted that Song was firing at the ground and the shot that hit Gross had ricocheted. The recovered bullet showed evidence of contact with a hard surface and the attorney said that dust clouds visible in surveillance video demonstrated that Song was firing at the ground. The attorney said Song intended the shots to be "suppressive fire" but conceded that the evidence was inconclusive.

On February 27, prosecutors filed a motion to prohibit the defendants from claiming self defense or defense of a third party, calling these theories "legally unsupportable" because the defendants had prompted the police response by shooting fireworks and damaging property. Prosecutors cited an appeals court decision which determined that the Branch Davidians could not invoke this defense regarding the 1993 Waco siege because the Branch Davidians had fired before law enforcement did. Pittman granted the motion on March 3, saying that Gross's decision to draw his pistol was not "excessive as a matter of law", as Gross did not use deadly force until after Song fired.

On March 9, expert witness for the prosecution Kyle Shideler testified that he provided language that prosecutors used in the indictment of the Prairieland defendants. Shideler put himself forward as an expert on, radical Islam, "Black identity extremism" and antifa. Under cross-examination, he declared that his research was "open-sourced" and not subject to peer review or typical data analysis practices. Shideler made claims about the defendants' Signal chats despite testifying that he had no previous experience analyzing "antifa chat groups". Shideler is the director of the Center for Security Policy, a right-wing think tank, as well as the author of "How to Dismantle Far-Left Extremist Networks: A Roadmap for the Trump Administration".

On March 13, 2026, the nine defendants were convicted by a Texas jury of providing material support for terrorism, and Song was convicted of the attempted murder of a police officer.

During the trial, prosecutors said that Song was the "ringleader" of an "antifa cell", and presented wearing all-black clothing during the protest and using the app Signal as causes for a charge of material support to terrorism, saying that "Providing your body as camouflage for others to do the enumerated acts is providing support". Other acts deemed material support included operating a printing press distributing left wing magazines and retweeting "antifa" tweets. Throughout the trial, the defendants denied being members of antifa. One cooperating defendant testified that she had not known what the term meant when she signed a guilty plea provided by the government that described the protesters as an "antifa cell". Another recanted an earlier statement that he heard other unidentified members of the group describe themselves as antifa, saying that he had never actually heard any of them use the word.

=== Sentencing ===
On June 23, 2026, federal judges Pittman and Reed O'Connor sentenced Batten, Evetts, Hill, Morris, Rueda, Sanchez Estrada, Song and Elizabeth Soto to the maximum possible incarceration periods in federal prison under United States Federal Sentencing Guidelines. Within a week, attorneys for Batten, Evetts, Sanchez Estrada, and Elizabeth Soto filed notices indicating that they are appealing the convictions; further details were not forthcoming.

On July 1, O'Connor and Pittman sentenced seven of the remaining convicts; Gibson, Morgan, and Ines Soto received longer sentences, while Baumann, Sharp, Sikes and Thomas were given lesser sentences for providing helpful information to the prosecution or law enforcement.

Baumann, who was the youngest defendant and testified at length for the prosecution, was given the most lenient sentence of 22 months. According to Pittman, Sikes was the first of the suspects to offer information that helped law enforcement locate Song; Sikes said he "loved his country" and "I wish I could have stopped this."

Pittman said that Kent, who was sentenced after the others on July 6, had only peripheral involvement. Kent's defense attorney said that Kent became involved in helping Song after trying to find her then-boyfriend Sikes at the Johnson County jail on July 5, 2025; there she encountered several other defendants, who told her about their plans to help him. The attorney said Kent helped primarily to support her friends, and never personally harbored Song as others did. Kent also received a reduced sentence for having testified in favor of the prosecution.

The defendants who had been personally present at the Prairieland Detention Center were ordered by the court to "jointly and separately" pay $4,408.95 in restitution to the detention center.

Defendant	Disposition	Imposed Punishment
Benjamin Hanil Song	Convicted of: Attempted murder of two correctional officers and Alvarado Police Officer; Discharging a firearm during and in furtherance of a crime; Riot, with the intent to commit an act of violence; Providing support to terrorists, a violation of 18 U.S. Code § 2339A; Conspiracy to use and carry explosives	100 years in prison
Maricela Rueda	Convicted of: Riot, with the intent to commit an act of violence; Providing support to terrorists, a violation of 18 U.S. Code § 2339A; Conspiracy to use and carry explosives; Conspiracy to conceal documents that implicated herself	70 years in prison
Autumn Hill	Convicted of: Riot, with the intent to commit an act of violence; Providing support to terrorists, a violation of 18 U.S. Code § 2339A; Conspiracy to use and carry explosives	50 years in prison
Savanna Batten	Convicted of: Riot, with the intent to commit an act of violence; Providing support to terrorists, a violation of 18 U.S. Code § 2339A; Conspiracy to use and carry explosives	50 years in prison
Zachary Evetts	Convicted of: Riot, with the intent to commit an act of violence; Providing support to terrorists, a violation of 18 U.S. Code § 2339A	50 years in prison
Meagan Morris	Convicted of: Riot, with the intent to commit an act of violence; Providing support to terrorists, a violation of 18 U.S. Code § 2339A; Conspiracy to use and carry explosives	50 years in prison
Ines Soto	Convicted of: Riot, with the intent to commit an act of violence; Providing support to terrorists, a violation of 18 U.S. Code § 2339A; Conspiracy to use and carry explosives	50 years in prison
Elizabeth (a.k.a. Liz) Soto	Convicted of: Riot, with the intent to commit an act of violence; Providing support to terrorists, a violation of 18 U.S. Code § 2339A; Conspiracy to use and carry explosives	50 years in prison
Daniel Rolando (a.k.a. Des) Sanchez Estrada	Convicted of: Corrupting and concealing documents, interfering with their ability to be used in grand jury and criminal proceedings; Conspiracy to conceal documents that would implicate Maricela Rueda	30 years in prison
Joy Gibson	Convicted of: Providing material support to terrorists	15 years in prison
Rebecca Morgan	Convicted of: Providing material support to terrorists	15 years in prison
Lynette Read Sharp	Convicted of: Providing material support to terrorists	9 years and 2 months in prison
John Phillip Thomas	Convicted of: Providing material support to terrorists	9 years and 2 months in prison
Susan Kent	Convicted of: Providing material support to terrorists	6 years in prison
Seth Sikes	Convicted of: Providing material support to terrorists	6 years in prison
Nathan (a.k.a. Nate) Baumann	Convicted of: Providing material support to terrorists	1 year and 10 months in prison

== Reactions ==
The Intercept described the two Republican-appointed judges as choosing "to make an example of the defendants", while The New York Times pointed out that the sentences were "significantly longer than the lengthiest sentence handed down... [for] joining in the attack on the Capitol on Jan. 6, 2021."

The Guardian described the sentences handed down in the case as "unusually harsh". The New Yorker described the trial as an example of how the Trump administration has turned leftist activism into terrorism.

Sam Russek with The New Republic writes that police body camera footage released by the prosecution is unclear, that it is difficult to tell who is shooting and how many shots are fired, and the provided footage ends moments after the police lieutenant is hit.

Supporters of the arrested women dispute conspiracy claims and said the women believed they were attending a peaceful protest. In statements to Truthout and KERA, two women arrested for alleged involvement in the initial incident said they believed they were attending a peaceful "noise demonstration", intended only to "show solidarity with the detainees" by setting off fireworks, and that they had no knowledge of any planned violence.

The National Lawyers Guild (NLG) released a statement characterizing the arrests as "unchecked state repression". Xavier de Janon, director of Mass Defense for the NLG, criticized the government for holding suspects "in limbo between state and federal jurisdiction" for extended periods, allegedly making it difficult for the suspects to obtain legal representation because the nature of the charges was unclear. De Janon expressed concern that the case could set a precedent for leveling federal conspiracy charges against anyone who attends a protest that "becomes volatile", saying that "the state could just accuse you of anything and say you 'conspired' to do [it]."

Mike German, a former FBI agent and Brennan Center for Justice associate interviewed by The Texas Observer, compared the antifa allegations to the FBI's past use of anarchism allegations to label leftist protestors:

While it wasn't put in a presidential memorandum, and they didn't use the word 'antifa,' the FBI has used the word 'anarchist' just as they [use] antifa: It was a word that encompassed every kind of leftist protest and actually described nothing.

In January 2026, Texas Attorney General Ken Paxton announced an investigation of the Screwston Anti-Fascist Committee in Houston, citing the Prairieland incident as justification, although none of the defendants are from the Houston area or have been tied to the Screwston organization. The organization sells antifa-themed merchandise, has worked to identify neo-Nazis in the Houston area, and has conducted fundraisers to support the Prairieland defendants.

=== Possession of banners, literature, and zines ===
The Intercept reported that a Prairieland defendant, Daniel Sanchez Estrada, was sentenced to 30 years in prison "for moving a box of antifascist zines".

Writing for Truthout in October 2025, Andrew Lee points out that evidence against the defendants includes their possession of protest banners and anarchist literature, which is broadly considered lawful under the First Amendment, and their possession of guns, which is commonplace in Texas and is protected by state laws allowing constitutional carry. In an October article for The Intercept, Natasha Lennard mirrors these concerns, pointing to a lack of evidence for a coordinated advance plan to shoot at government agents.

In a November article for The Intercept, Seth Stern criticizes the government for "characterizing lawful activism and ideologies as terrorist conspiracies" and arresting the Denton apartment suspect, Daniel Sanchez Estrada, for possessing anarchist literature and zines, which is generally considered protected by the First Amendment:

At what point does a literary collection or newspaper subscription become prosecutorial evidence under the Trump administration's logic? Essentially, whenever it's convenient. The vagueness is a feature, not a bug. When people don't know which political materials might later be deemed evidence of criminality, the safest course is to avoid engaging with controversial ideas altogether.

== See also ==
- 2019 Tacoma immigration detention center attack
- 2024 Pacific Beach antifa trial
- 2025 Dallas ICE facility shooting
- 2025 United States protests against mass deportation
- Deportation in the second Trump administration
- Political violence in the United States
- NSPM-7
