= 2025 Dallas ICE facility shooting =

Shooting in Texas, US

- Location: 32°49′24.5″N 96°52′20.4″W; 8101 North Stemmons Freeway, Love Field, Dallas, Texas, US
- Date: September 24, 2025; 6:40 a.m. CDT (UTC−5)
- Target: United States Immigration and Customs Enforcement agents
- Attack type: Murder-suicide, sniper attack
- Weapon: 8mm bolt action rifle
- Deaths: 3 (including the perpetrator)
- Injuries: 1
- Perpetrator: Joshua Jahn
- Motive: Opposition to ICE

On September 24, 2025, 29-year-old Joshua Jahn shot three people detained by United States Immigration and Customs Enforcement (ICE) agents at an immigration facility near Interstate 35E in the Love Field area of Dallas, Texas, before shooting and killing himself. The shooter fired multiple rounds from a nearby rooftop down into the field office's sally port.

One of the victims was killed on scene, while the other two were taken to nearby hospitals in critical condition. One of them died from his injuries six days later. All three were shot in a van in the sally port. No officers or staff were injured.

Jahn, who had no known political affiliations or overt anti-ICE activity online, had a prior drug-related arrest and some experience with firearms. Authorities found "ANTI-ICE" markings on unfired ammunition at the scene and anti-ICE notes in his personal effects, leading investigators to conclude that the attack was a premeditated terrorist act, but that he acted alone and was targeting ICE agents rather than detainees. Details of the attack and Jahn's background remain under investigation.

== Background ==
The shooting came after three prior attacks at Immigration and Customs Enforcement (ICE) and Customs and Border Protection (CBP) (Note: CBP and ICE are part of the United States Department of Homeland Security. ICE is charged with immigration law enforcement generally, while CBP is focused on physical border control and collecting import duties. The United States Border Patrol is part of CBP.) facilities in Texas within the preceding three months, amid controversy about the Trump administration's large-scale deportation operations. Reuters described aggressive use of ICE agents across the country as sparking frequent protests, with ICE detention facilities becoming "flashpoints of unrest" with "heavily armed agents deploying pepper ball guns, tear gas and other chemical agents in clashes with protesters". In late July, CNN reported that multiple polls showed a majority of Americans disapproved of the agency and its immigration enforcement actions, with approval ratings falling even lower than its negative ratings during the 2018 "Abolish ICE" movement. In late August, the Pew Research Center reported that its polls showed an increasingly sharp partisan divide in views of ICE, with 72% of Republican Party supporters viewing the agency favorably, and 78% of Democratic Party supporters viewing it negatively.

On July 4, 2025, a group gathered at an ICE facility in Alvarado, Texas, vandalizing vehicles and a guard structure and setting off fireworks. At least one gunman in a nearby wooded area then allegedly fired an AR-15–style rifle at arriving police, injuring an Alvarado police officer. Several suspects had left wing ties, and investigators found anti-government, anti-ICE, and anarchist documents. Three days later, 27-year-old Ryan Louis Mosqueda, who was from Michigan but was living in nearby Weslaco, attacked a CBP facility in McAllen, Texas, firing several rifle shots into the facility but failing to gain access. Two officers and a Border Patrol employee were injured before local police and Border Patrol officers shot and killed Mosqueda. In an interview with WOOD-TV, Mosqueda's brother said that the family did not believe he had political motives and could not explain why he targeted CBP, but speculated it was due to emergent and untreated "mental health issues". On August 25, a 36-year-old Dallas man was arrested at the Dallas ICE facility for claiming he had a bomb and showing officers what he said was a detonator on his wrist.

== Shooting ==
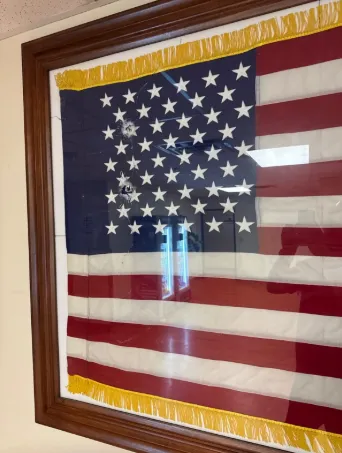
An American flag inside the facility with bullet holes

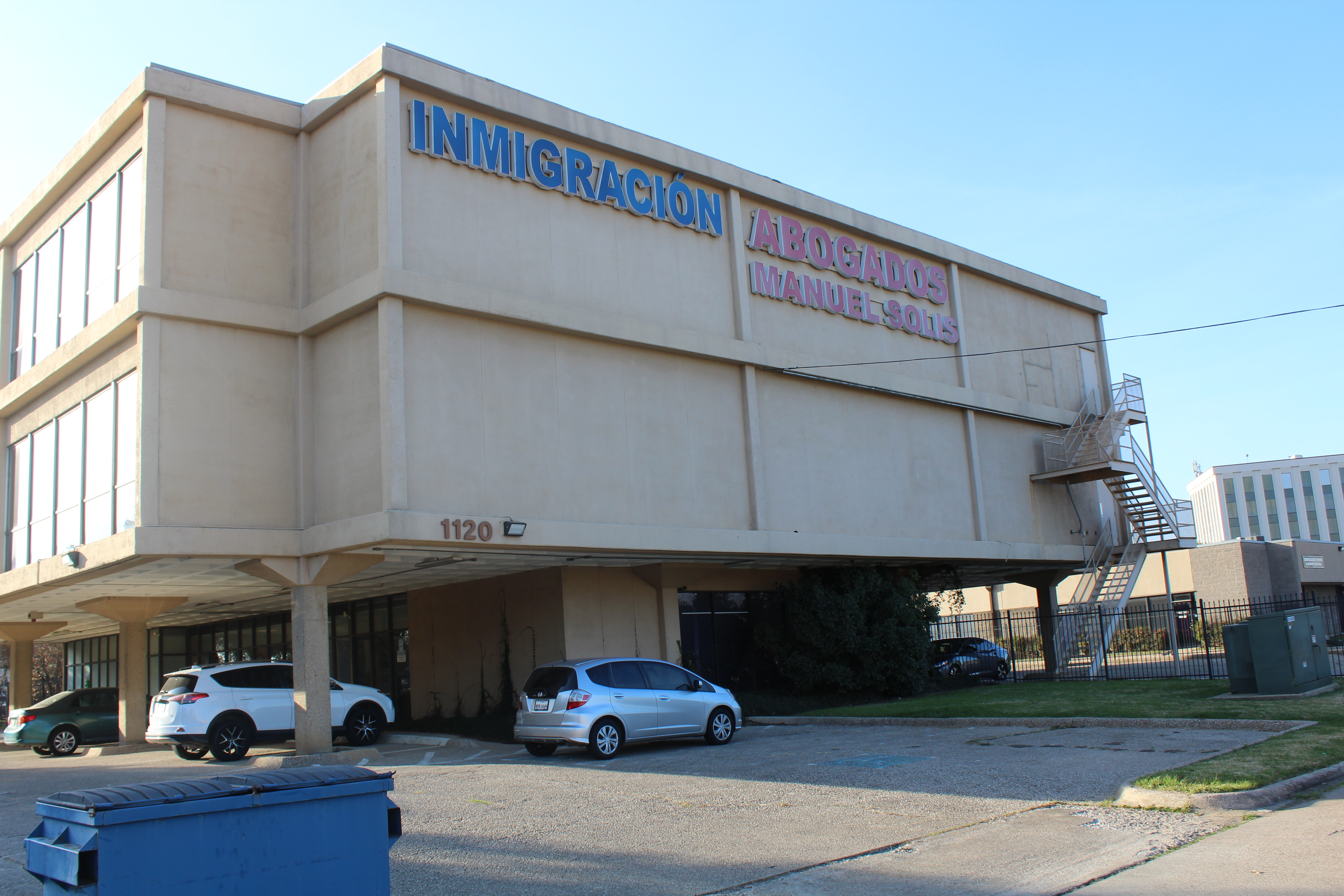
Shots were fired from the rooftop of the Abogado de Inmigración Manuel Solis building across the street

The shooter began firing at the building and a transport van in the sally port from the rooftop of a nearby attorney's office at around 6:40 a.m. The port is a fortified entryway that is commonly seen in police stations, prisons and military bases.

A witness said he heard around six to ten gunshots before the gunman shot himself. All three victims were shot inside the van. Dozens of police units and multiple ambulances were seen near the facility. According to a second witness, ICE agents evacuated all employees and visitors from the facility to a secure area until the scene was confirmed to be safe.

== Victims ==
Initially, the Department of Homeland Security (DHS) reported two of the three victims died, but later reported one of them died while the other two were in critical condition. Federal officials at first declined to divulge any other information about the victims, drawing criticism from the Texas Civil Rights Project, a civil rights advocacy group. On September 26, federal officials named the victims and described them as a Mexican man, a Venezuelan man, and a third man from an unspecified country. Officials would not confirm which victim had been killed, what criminal allegations the victims faced, or the condition and location of the wounded. A man identifying himself as his brother told the news media that the Mexican victim remained in critical condition at a local hospital.

On September 27, the Dallas County Medical Examiner's Office identified the deceased victim as Norlan Guzman-Fuentes; an anonymous DHS press release confirmed his identity and said he was from El Salvador, but did not divulge the condition or location of the other victims.

On September 30, a second shooting victim was confirmed dead: Miguel Ángel García-Hernández, the victim from Mexico. García-Hernández was 32 years old and was originally from San Luis Potosí, but had emigrated to the Dallas area with his parents about twenty years prior, and worked as a house painter. He had been placed in ICE custody after being detained on suspicion of driving while intoxicated and evading arrest in Tarrant County, Texas. At the time of his death, he had four children, and his wife was expecting the birth of their third child together.

== Perpetrator ==
Police sources identified the shooter as 29-year-old Joshua Jahn. Law enforcement responded to two addresses possibly linked to Jahn in Fairview, Texas (where Jahn and his parents lived throughout most of his life), and Durant, Oklahoma (where he once resided). Records indicated that Jahn most recently lived in Durant, but in Federal Bureau of Investigation (FBI) interviews, his parents said he had been living with them until the morning of the incident.

Jahn was born in April 1996 and grew up in Allen, Texas. He grew up in an upper middle class home, where his father was a mechanical engineer and his mother was a physical therapist. Friends interviewed by The Dallas Morning News said that while he was attending Allen High School, he was popular and good with computers, but was also a "daredevil and prankster" who became increasingly drawn to "fringe websites" and recreational drugs including marijuana and LSD. After Jahn's family moved to nearby Fairview, Jahn attended Collin College sporadically from 2013 to 2018, but is not known to have graduated. Jahn also studied mechanical engineering at the University of Texas at Dallas, but dropped out after failing most of his classes. During this time, he worked various retail jobs for short periods. Jahn was arrested in Collin County in 2015 for marijuana possession and was charged the following year.

In late 2017, in response to an internet advertisement, Jahn moved to Benton City, Washington, and worked a seasonal job harvesting legal marijuana while living in his car. His employer told The New York Times that Jahn "was just a weirdo" and "I could tell he was just lost." He said he gave extra work to Jahn because he liked him and felt sorry for him, but eventually laid him off because he was not reliable. The man also said Jahn never discussed politics around him. Jahn then returned to Texas and got a job installing solar panels on rooftops in 2018, but this job lasted "less than a few months," according to the company. The Times found no documentation of Jahn holding any job after his departure from this company in 2019, which was confirmed by friends interviewed by the Morning News. In FBI interviews, his parents said they had been his sole source of support for several years leading up to the shooting, that he had become "obsessed" with artificial intelligence and believed he was suffering from radiation sickness, and he routinely wore cotton gloves because he believed he was allergic to plastic. Friends said that he had become withdrawn socially and they were concerned about his mental health, but they did not believe he would have sought help on his own.

Jahn's brother said that he was not especially interested in politics and had not voiced opinions to his family opposing ICE, stating that "I didn't know he had any political intent at all". The brother also said his parents owned a rifle and Jahn knew how to use it but opined "He would not be able to make any shots like that." Jahn was a registered independent in Oklahoma and last voted there in November 2024; he also voted in the 2020 Texas Democratic presidential primary in March of that year. (Note: At the time of these events, Texas used an open primary system in which a voter was not required to register with a political party before voting in that party's primary election, and supporters of one party could potentially vote in an opposing party's primary to influence the outcome of the general election.) According to the Times, Jahn had an extensive online presence including at least two Reddit accounts, but little of his online activity was overtly political; most of it concerned marijuana, cars, video gaming, and South Park. Two friends interviewed by the Morning News disbelieved that he had political motivations; one said "He had an independent streak and he could give a f— about party affiliation."

== Investigation ==
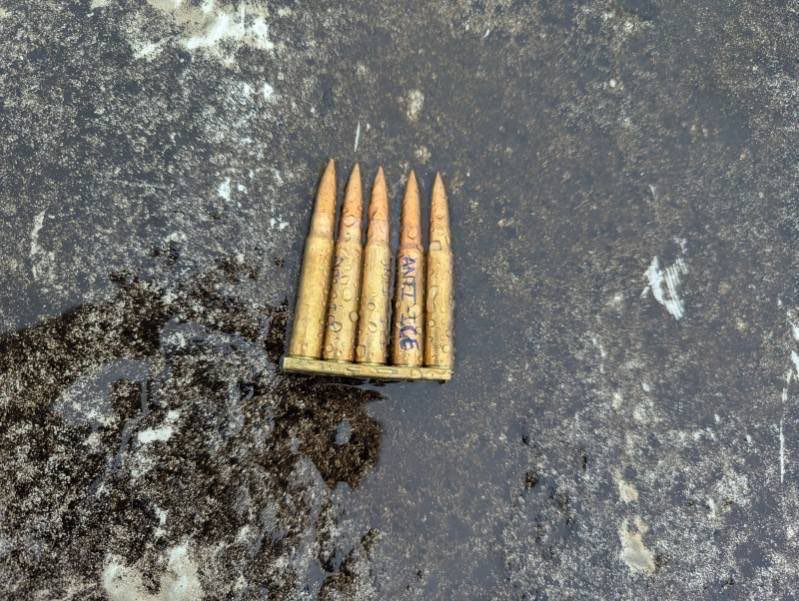
A photo of unfired ammunition with "ANTI-ICE" written on one of the casings

In a Twitter post, FBI director Kash Patel shared images of unfired rifle cartridges with the words "ANTI-ICE" written on one of the casings, alleging that they belonged to the suspect. Patel also said the shooter downloaded a document containing a list of United States Department of Homeland Security facilities, searched for apps that tracked the presence of ICE agents, sought information on ballistics and looked into video footage of the assassination of Charlie Kirk. The FBI began investigating the shooting as a targeted attack. Former FBI counter-terrorism and counterintelligence operative Eric O'Neill announced details about an investigation.

In a press briefing held on September 25, federal officials positively identified the shooter as Jahn, and said that their investigation suggested that he acted alone, that the attack was planned in advance, his motive was to terrorize ICE agents, and that he most likely intended to kill only agents and not detainees. Handwritten notes in Jahn's personal effects described ICE activities as "human trafficking", stated "I want to cause terror" and "Yes, it was just me", and said ICE employees were "showing up to collect a dirty pay check". Officials said that Jahn was seen driving his car to the building around 3 a.m. with a large ladder, which he used to access the roof, and that he used an 8mm bolt action rifle which he had purchased legally about a month earlier. Nancy Larson, the acting U.S. attorney for the Northern District of Texas, said that "We did not find evidence of [Jahn's] membership in any specific group or entity".

A sign found on a car reportedly belonging to Jahn read "Radioactive fallout from nuclear formations that've passed over these areas more than 2x since 1951." [sic]

== Reactions ==
=== Domestic ===
Axios described the shooting as triggering a "partisan blame game" as Trump administration officials and MAGA influencers immediately blamed Democrats and anti-law enforcement rhetoric more broadly for the shooting before local police had identified the suspect or a motive.

Trump was described by Reuters as having "quickly politicized" the incident, with Trump writing on Truth Social shortly after the shooting that "Radical Left Democrats" were stoking anti-ICE violence by "constantly demonizing Law Enforcement, calling for ICE to be demolished, and comparing ICE Officers to Nazis". Vice President JD Vance posted a statement on Twitter, saying that the "obsessive attack on law enforcement, particularly ICE, must stop". He added in a statement that he's "praying for everyone hurt in the attack and for their families." Secretary Kristi Noem also responded in a social media post. Noem said more ICE agents and law enforcement officers will be hired in response to the shooting and called the shooter "evil". Acting ICE director Todd Lyons called the shooting his "worst nightmare". Texas senator John Cornyn called the shooting "horrific" and said that "he would keep everyone involved in his prayers, and promising a full investigation."

Texas senator Ted Cruz also weighed in, saying that his team "is closely monitoring the situation at the facility". He spoke that "his team are praying for the swift recovery of those injured, and we are deeply grateful to the brave first responders who rushed to the scene." Texas governor Greg Abbott said the state fully supports ICE and that the attack would not slow arrests, detentions and the deportation of illegal immigrants. Marc Veasey also released a similar statement, saying that "his office is aware of the developing situation and will continue to monitor the situation", adding that "they're keeping the victims in prayer." Dallas Mayor Eric Johnson encouraged the public to withhold conclusions about the shooter and their motives.

Democratic National Committee Chair Ken Martin wrote that he was "immensely grateful" to the first responders, writing that "I'm praying for the victims and their families" and that "this kind of violence has no place in our democracy". Democrats criticized Cruz and others of selectively releasing information about the shooting to "control the narrative" of ICE agents under siege, with Democratic U.S. rep. Marc Veasey stating he was "absolutely sickened" by the comments, saying that "If they are trying to control this narrative and they don't want migrants to be the victim in this story, then they may want to slow-walk giving us any information about this so they can still keep on talking about attacks on ICE".

=== International ===
The Consulate-General of Mexico in Dallas contacted local authorities after the attack and confirmed that one of the seriously injured victims was a Mexican national. Roberto Velasco Álvarez, the North America Unit Chief, expressed concerns through diplomatic channels and requested unfettered access to their wounded national while the Secretariat of Foreign Affairs reiterated its commitment to protecting Mexican citizens in the United States.

== See also ==
- 2019 Tacoma immigration detention center attack
- 2025 Prairieland ICE detention center incident
