= Administrative subpoena =

Subpoena issued without judicial review

An administrative subpoena under United States law is a subpoena issued by a federal agency without prior judicial oversight. Unlike with judicial subpoenas that require a court order, or grand jury subpoenas that require grand jury authorization, the congressional statutes that empower administrative subpoenas allow agencies to compel the production of documents, records, or testimony without court involvement as part of their regulatory or investigative functions. Congress has expanded this authority significantly since the September 11 attacks, with agencies such as the Drug Enforcement Administration, Internal Revenue Service, Department of Homeland Security, and Securities and Exchange Commission among those empowered to issue such subpoenas.

The practice has generated substantial legal and policy debate. Critics say that administrative subpoena authority is a violation of the Fourth Amendment to the United States Constitution, arguing that it circumvents traditional warrant requirements and judicial checks on government power. Proponents say that it provides a valuable investigative tool that enables agencies to efficiently gather information necessary for law enforcement and regulatory compliance without the delays inherent in seeking court approval.

== Enforcement ==
Different U.S. federal agencies may issue administrative subpoenas for civil enforcement actions or as part of criminal investigations. Since different types of administrative subpoenas are authorized by different statutes, they have a range of enforcement procedures, but typically they rely on courts for enforcement. For this reason, recipients of some kinds of subpoenas decline to provide the requested information and instead challenge the order in court, and wait for a court to order them to comply. Courts typically exercise substantial deference to the agency requesting the subpoena in deciding whether to enforce it. The decision of a district court to enforce an administrative subpoena is held to the standard of being reviewed for abuse of discretion, itself a deferential standard.

== History ==
=== Antecedents in England ===
Historical antecedents for the modern-day administrative subpoena date back to the prerogative courts in England in the 15th to 17th centuries, including the Star Chamber, which issued warrants and subpoenas that were not subject to significant procedural safeguards or the rule of law. In English history, the power of government to compel without court involvement has been described as "absolute power" or "prerogatives", which was given by John Adams as a primary target for elimination by the American Constitution.

=== Early uses ===
Before the early 2000s, administrative subpoenas were most commonly issued by the Offices of the Inspector General of various federal agencies for civil enforcement actions. This authority was granted by the Inspector General Act of 1978. The Drug Enforcement Administration was granted administrative subpoena authority under the Comprehensive Drug Abuse Prevention and Control Act of 1970.

The Department of the Treasury's Office of Foreign Assets Control (OFAC) uses administrative subpoenas to initiate civil investigations of potential U.S. economic sanctions violations. This authority derives from the International Emergency Economic Powers Act, enacted in 1977, and the Trading With the Enemy Act of 1917. OFAC subpoenas are typically to be responded to in 30 days and require the subpoenaed party to turn over full and complete information, as well as, supporting documentation to verify the information provided in the response.

=== Expansion in the 1990s and 2000s ===
In 1996, Congress expanded the authority to issue the subpoenas to the Federal Bureau of Investigation (FBI) when investigating health care fraud cases under the Health Insurance Portability and Accountability Act. The FBI is also authorized to send national security letters, a type of administrative subpoena, to gather information for national security purposes. By the early 2000s, various executive branch agencies had 335 administrative subpoena authorities, established by various statutes. As the various statutes do not have a unified enforcement mechanism, diverge in their formulation, and do not uniformly call on judicial involvement, proposals for reform have tended appear in government watchdog reports.

=== 2010s and 2020s ===
During the first Trump presidency Twitter, Inc. sued the Department of Homeland Security over an administrative subpoena of an account critical of the administration.

Starting in the immigration policy of the first Trump administration, Immigration and Customs Enforcement has used immigration subpoenas, a form of administrative subpoena, to compel state and local governments to provide information about people to support immigration enforcement and deportation. In 2025–2026, the Department of Homeland Security has issued hundreds of administrative subpoenas to companies, including Google and Meta, to request information about people who have criticized or protested aspects of the immigration policy of the second Trump administration. Civil rights organizations, including the American Civil Liberties Union, have filed legal challenges and criticized these requests for overstepping the scope of the relevant laws and violating the First Amendment.

== See also ==
- Administrative warrant
- Emergency data request
- Stored Communications Act
- Warrantless searches in the United States
