= Ernesto Gonzalez (judge) =

American judge (born 1962)

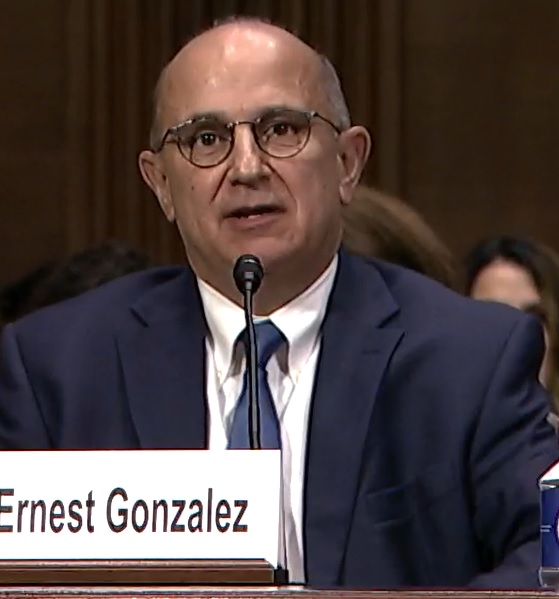

Judge of the United States District Court for the Western District of Texas
- Incumbent
- Assumed office April 9, 2024
- Appointed by: Joe Biden
- Preceded by: Philip Ray Martinez

Personal details
- Born: 1962 (age 63–64) San Antonio, Texas, U.S.
- Education: University of Texas at San Antonio (BA); Texas Southern University (JD)

Ernesto "Ernest" Gonzalez (born 1962) is an American lawyer who has served as a United States district judge of the United States District Court for the Western District of Texas since 2024. He previously served with the United States Department of Justice Criminal Division from 2023 to 2024.

== Education ==
Gonzalez received a Bachelor of Arts from the University of Texas at San Antonio in 1987 and a Juris Doctor from the Thurgood Marshall School of Law at Texas Southern University in Houston in 1993.

== Career ==
From 1994 to 2000, Gonzalez worked as an assistant district attorney in Bexar County in San Antonio, Texas. From 2000 to 2003, he was an assistant United States attorney in the U.S. Attorney's Office for the Western District of Texas and from 2003 to 2023, he served as an assistant United States attorney in the U.S. Attorney's Office for the Eastern District of Texas. From 2023 to 2024, Gonzalez served as a senior attorney advisor in the U.S. Department of Justice's Criminal Division, Narcotics and Dangerous Drugs Section.

=== Federal judicial service ===
On December 19, 2023, President Joe Biden announced his intent to nominate Gonzalez to serve as a United States district judge of the United States District Court for the Western District of Texas. His nomination received support from Senators John Cornyn and Ted Cruz. On January 10, 2024, his nomination was sent to the Senate. President Biden nominated Gonzalez to the seat vacated by Judge Frank Montalvo, who assumed senior status on December 1, 2022. On January 24, 2024, a hearing on his nomination was held before the Senate Judiciary Committee. On February 7, 2024, his nomination was withdrawn and he was renominated to the seat vacated by Judge Philip Ray Martinez, who died on February 26, 2021. On February 29, 2024, his nomination was reported out of committee by a 20–1 vote. On March 22, 2024, the United States Senate confirmed his nomination by an 88–7 vote. He received his judicial commission on April 9, 2024.

=== Controversy ===
Shortly after his confirmation, a controversy developed regarding where Gonzalez would be seated within the district. Chief Judge Alia Moses wanted to move him from the Del Rio courthouse (where Moses sits) to the Austin courthouse. Moses denied a personal motive and said she wanted Gonzalez to avoid a conflict of interest with his brother. Gonzalez's brother is a supervisor in the El Paso division of the US Attorney's Office for the Western District of Texas. An agreement was then reached with the U.S. Attorney's office and Fifth Circuit Chief Judge Priscilla Richman that Gonzalez's brother would not handle cases in Del Rio once Gonzalez took the bench.

== See also ==
- List of Hispanic and Latino American jurists

Legal offices
Preceded by Philip Ray Martinez	Judge of the United States District Court for the Western District of Texas; 2024–present	Incumbent
