= 35 Bar & Grille LLC v. City of San Antonio =

2013 United States court case

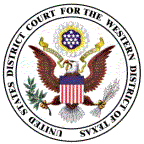
- Court: United States District Court for the Western District of Texas
- Decided: April 29, 2013
- Docket nos.: 5:13-cv-00034-FB

Court membership
- Judge sitting: Samuel Frederick Biery Jr.

35 Bar and Grille LLC, et al. v. The City of San Antonio was a court case in the U.S. District Court for the Western District of Texas. The case addressed a city ordinance about the amount of bodily coverage needed by semi-nude dancers in San Antonio, Texas. The case reached notoriety in international press when the press discovered that Chief U.S. District Judge Fred Biery's April 29, 2013 order denying a motion for a preliminary injunction was full of puns and double entendres about stripping and sexuality. During its press coverage, the case was also known by the humorous title applied to the judge's opinion of the case, The Itsy Bitsy Teeny Weeny Bikini Top v The (More) Itsy Bitsy Teeny Weeny Pastie (a reference to the song "Itsy Bitsy Teenie Weenie Yellow Polkadot Bikini").

== Background ==
In 2012, the city of San Antonio amended its city ordinances dealing with "sexually oriented businesses", or SOBs. Among other changes, the amendment redefined "nudity" to include "a state of dress that fails to completely and opaquely cover...the entire female breast". Whereas female dancers had previously been able to avoid being classified as "nude" by wearing pasties over their nipples, the new law required that they wear at minimum a bra or bikini top. Any business not meeting that requirement had to seek a permit as a SOB. The law also augmented fines associated with failure to comply with these regulations.

The amendments were proposed to address concerns from parents about the proximity of semi-nude dance clubs to schools. Police Chief Bill McManus applauded the amendment because it simplified enforcement by eliminating legal "grey areas"; he also noted connections between the presence of such establishments and area crime rates. However, strip clubs objected on the grounds that no consultation or public hearings had taken place prior to the amendments being passed. Richard Deegear, a lawyer representing several establishments, noted that "This entire process has been a disappointment because there hasn't been any process to speak of" and stated that he intended to bring the matter to court. Previous attempts by the city in 2005 to regulate these business had also been challenged in court.

== Proceedings ==
A case challenging the amendments was filed against the city on 11 January 2013 in the United States District Court for the Western District of Texas. The plaintiffs in the case were: 35 Bar and Grille, LLC; C. B. Restaurants, Inc.; E & I Enterprises, Inc.; Endless Music, LLC; FLWW, Inc.; Hacienda Club, LLC; KHG of San Antonio; Michael D's Restaurant San Antonio, Inc.; RCI Entertainment (San Antonio), Inc.; Sacolo, LTD.; Spiros Partnership, Ltd.; Tripolis Enterprises, Inc.; and the Players Club, LLC. The case was assigned to Chief U.S. District Judge Fred Biery in February 2013. Biery had previously presided over a 2003 case involving nude dancing.

Plaintiffs argued that the amendments violated their first amendment right to free speech. They also complained that forcing their dancers to be more covered would reduce the profit margin of their companies. They sought an injunction against enforcement of the ordinance.

In early February, Biery issued an order that the city not enforce the ordinance until the request for injunction was considered at a hearing.

=== Decision ===
On 29 April 2013, Judge Biery issued a decision denying the request for an injunction. He found that the plaintiffs had not met the burden of proof to justify an injunction. His decision included a loose paraphrase of the Bible and other works of literature (for example Hamlet and To Kill a Mockingbird) and a photograph of "Miss Wiggles", a 1960s-era clothed exotic dancer, in addition to the usual case references. The decision concluded "Should the parties choose to string this case out to trial on the merits, the Court encourages reasonable discovery intercourse as they navigate the peaks and valleys of litigation, perhaps to reach a happy ending".

When discussing the importance of the argument, despite its playfulness, the press described the opinion as highlighting important problems in American society. In particular, Biery's opinion also highlighted the problems inherent with the assumptions from lawmakers about stemming crime related to Sexually Oriented Businesses, writing:

While the court finds these businesses to be nefarious magnets of mischief, the court doubts several square inches of fabric will stanch the flow of violence and other secondary effects emanating from these businesses. Indeed, this case exposes the underbelly of America's Romanesque passion for entertainment, sex and money, sought to be covered with constitutional prophylaxis.

== Response ==
In the press following the ruling, many newspapers commented on the humor and amount of careful use of suggestive language within the opinion. The Telegraph called the case "world's cheekiest written ruling". Similarly, The Huffington Post business section called the case "one of the funniest, most eloquent court documents we've ever seen."

The lawyer representing the strip clubs expressed a similar opinion to the press when talking about the ruling telling local press "one of the most entertaining things I've ever seen".
