= List of St. Mary's University School of Law people =

List of people associated with St. Mary's University School of Law

This is list of notable alumni of St. Mary's University School of Law.

== Judiciary ==
- Elma Salinas Ender, J.D. 1978, first Hispanic woman to serve on a state district court in Texas; Judge of the 341st Judicial District in Laredo from 1983 until her retirement in 2012
- David Alan Ezra, J.D. 1972, U.S. District Judge, United States District Court for the District of Hawaii
- Paul W. Green, J.D. 1977, Justice, Texas Supreme Court
- Thad Heartfield, J.D. 1965, Chief Judge, United States District Court for the Eastern District of Texas
- Kathleen Cardone, J.D. 1979, U.S. District Judge, United States District for the Western District of Texas
- Barbara Hervey, J.D. 1979, Place 7 judge of the Texas Court of Criminal Appeals; first elected in 2000
- Julie Kocurek, J.D. 1990, presiding judge of the 390th District Court in Travis County, Texas.
- Marina Garcia Marmolejo, J.D. 1996, U.S. District Judge, United States District Court for the Southern District of Texas
- Rose Spector, J.D. 1965, First woman elected, in 1992, to serve as a Justice of the Texas Supreme Court
- Nelson Wolff, J.D. 1966, Judge, Bexar County Court (2001–2018); Mayor of San Antonio, Texas (1991–1995); Former Texas State Senator for Texas's 26th Senate District (1973–1975); Former Texas State Representative from Bexar County (1971–1973)

== Elected officials ==
- John Cornyn, J.D. 1977, U.S. Senator from Texas since 2002; Senate Minority Whip since 2013; Former Justice of the Texas Supreme Court; 49th Attorney General of Texas (1999–2002)
- Victor De Yurre, J.D., former member of the Miami City Commission
- Michael McCaul, J.D. 1987, U.S. Representative from Texas's 10th Congressional District
- Glenn Hegar, M.A. and J.D. 1997, Texas State Senator 2007–2014; Member of the Texas House from 2003 to 2007; elected Texas Comptroller of Public Accounts in 2014 State General Election
- Alfonso “Poncho” Nevarez, Jr, J.D. 1999, Texas House of Representatives from January 8, 2013 – January 12, 2021; Texas Monthly included him on its 2019 "Worst Legislators" list; arrested for cocaine possession
- Carlos Uresti, J.D. 1992, Former Texas State Senator for Texas's 19th Senate District
- Kika de la Garza, J.D. 1952, Former U.S. Representative for Texas's 15th Congressional District, former Chairman of House Agriculture Committee, Former Texas State Representative
- Blake Farenthold, J.D. 1989, Former U.S. Representative for Texas's 27th Congressional District
- Charlie Gonzalez, J.D. 1972, Former U.S. Representative for Texas's 20th Congressional District
- Henry B. Gonzalez, J.D. 1943, Former U.S. Representative for Texas's 20th Congressional District; Former Chairman of the House Committee on Financial Services
- Michael McCaul, J.D. 1987, U.S. Representative for Texas's 10th Congressional District; Chairman of the House Committee on Homeland Security
- Scott McInnis, J.D. 1980, Former U.S. Representative from Colorado's 3rd congressional district
- Walter Thomas Price IV, J.D., Texas State Representative for Texas's 87th House District
- Stuart Bowen, J.D. 1991, Special Inspector General for Iraq Reconstruction
- Tom Corbett, J.D. 1975, 46th Governor of Pennsylvania (2011–2015), 46th Attorney General of Pennsylvania (2005–2011), Former U.S. Attorney for the Western District of Pennsylvania
- Peter Kinder, J.D. 1979, 46th Lieutenant Governor of Missouri
- Rolando Pablos, J.D. 1998, 111th Texas Secretary of State
- Pete Saenz, J. D. 1983, Mayor of Laredo, Texas (2014-2022)
- Eddie Morales, J. D. 2000, Texas State Representative

== Other ==
- Hayden C. Covington, J.D. 1933, Legal Counsel for the Watch Tower Bible and Tract Society of Pennsylvania in the mid-20th century (had argued many cases Before the U.S. Supreme Court)
- Charles Fincher, J.D. 1971, American cartoonist ("Thadeus & Weez")
- Mario G. Obledo, LL.B. 1960, co-founder of the Mexican American Legal Defense and Education Fund
- Chris Marrou, J.D. 2007, former news anchor for KENS-TV
