= Ben Rice (disambiguation) =

Ben Rice (born 1999) is an American baseball player.

Ben or Benjamin Rice may also refer to:

- Benjamin F. Rice (1828–1905), American politician, United States senator from Arkansas
- Ben Herbert Rice Jr. (1889–1964), United States federal judge
- Ben Rice (author) (born 1972), British author
- Ben Rice (producer), American record producer, songwriter and musician
