= Temporary Emergency Court of Appeals =

The Temporary Emergency Court of Appeals was established by the United States Congress in December 1971 with exclusive jurisdiction to hear appeals from the decisions of the U.S. district courts in cases arising under the wage and price control program of the Economic Stabilization Act of 1970.

Congress authorized the Chief Justice of the United States to appoint to the temporary court three or more district and appeals court judges, each of whom was to serve on a part-time basis for an indefinite term. The court exercised the same powers as a U.S. court of appeals, and it was authorized to prescribe its own rules of practice, which it did when its three district and six circuit court judges convened for the first time in February 1972. The Temporary Emergency Court of Appeals was modeled on the Emergency Court of Appeals, which was established in 1942 to hear appeals in cases involving various wartime price control measures and which heard its last case in 1961.

It was created by the Act of December 22, 1971 (Pub. L. 92–210, 85 Stat. 743). Although the Economic Stabilization Act expired in 1974, Congress extended the operation of the Temporary Emergency Court of Appeals in the Emergency Petroleum Allocation Act of 1973. The court exercised the judicial review provisions of the energy price stabilization program established by the act. The temporary court’s jurisdiction was further expanded in the Energy Policy and Conservation Act of 1975 and the Emergency Natural Gas Act of 1977 (91 Stat. 4). The Act of October 29, 1992 (Pub. L. 102–572, 106 Stat. 4506) abolished the Temporary Emergency Court of Appeals and transferred both its jurisdiction and its pending cases to the U.S. Court of Appeals for the Federal Circuit effective March 29, 1993.

== List of judges ==
The following judges were members of the Temporary Emergency Court of Appeals:

Judge	Active service	Chief Judge
Robert P. Anderson	1972–1978	
James Marshall Carter	1972–1979	
Albert Sherman Christensen	1972–1993	
Joe Ewing Estes	1972–1987	
William H. Hastie	1972–1976	
John Simpson Hastings	1972–1976	
Frank Minis Johnson	1972–1982	
Edward Allen Tamm	1972–1981	1972–1981
Martin Donald Van Oosterhout	1972–1977	
Robert A. Grant	1976–1993	
Joe McDonald Ingraham	1976–1988	
William James Jameson	1976–1987	
William H. Becker	1977–1992	
Dudley Baldwin Bonsal	1977–1987	
Walter Pettus Gewin	1977–1981	
Walter Edward Hoffman	1977–1993	
John Keating Regan	1977–1987	
Herbert Peter Sorg	1977–1979	
Alfonso Zirpoli	1977–1987	
Frederick Bernard Lacey	1978–1986	
Ben C. Duniway	1979–1986	
Earl R. Larson	1979–1982	
Charles Miller Metzner	1979–1993	
Lewis Render Morgan	1979–1987	
John Weld Peck II	1979–1993	
Wesley E. Brown	1980–1993	
Edward Thaxter Gignoux	1980–1987	
Sam C. Pointer Jr.	1980–1987	
Stanley Alexander Weigel	1980–1993	
Robert W. Hemphill	1981–1983	
Robert Earl Maxwell	1981–1983	
Adrian Anthony Spears	1981–1982	
J. Skelly Wright	1981–1987	1982–1987
Walter Early Craig	1982–1986	
Frederick Alvin Daugherty	1982–1993	
Reynaldo Guerra Garza	1982–1993	1987–1993
Thomas Jamison MacBride	1982–1987	
Raymond Clyne McNichols	1982–1985	
Morey Leonard Sear	1982–1993	
Homer Thornberry	1982–1993	
