= William Thornberry =

William Thornberry is the name of:

- William McClellan "Mac" Thornberry (b. 1958), U.S. Representative from Texas (1995–present)
- William Homer Thornberry (1909–1995), U.S. Representative from Texas (1945–1963) and federal judge
