= Sam Sparks =

American judge (1939–2025)

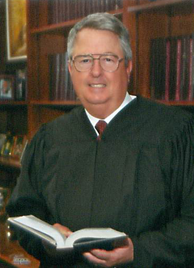

Senior Judge of the United States District Court for the Western District of Texas
- In office December 31, 2017 – September 17, 2025

Judge of the United States District Court for the Western District of Texas
- In office November 25, 1991 – December 31, 2017
- Appointed by: George H. W. Bush
- Preceded by: Seat established by 104 Stat. 5089
- Succeeded by: Jason K. Pulliam

Personal details
- Born: September 27, 1939 Austin, Texas, U.S.
- Died: September 17, 2025 (aged 85)
- Education: University of Texas (BA, LLB)

Sam Sparks (September 27, 1939 – September 17, 2025) was a United States district judge of the Austin Division of the United States District Court for the Western District of Texas.

== Life and career ==
After graduating from Austin High School as senior class president, Sparks received a Bachelor of Arts degree from the University of Texas in 1961 where he was a member of the Texas Cowboys and the Delta Tau Delta fraternity. He earned a Bachelor of Laws from the University of Texas School of Law two years later. From 1964 to 1965, he clerked for Judge Homer Thornberry. From 1965 to 1991, he was in private practice in El Paso, Texas.

=== Federal judicial service ===
Sparks was nominated by President George H. W. Bush on October 1, 1991, to the United States District Court for the Western District of Texas, to a new seat created by 104 Stat. 5089. He was confirmed by the Senate on November 21, 1991, and received his commission on November 25, 1991. He assumed senior status on December 31, 2017.

=== Notable cases ===
Sparks once began an order with a poem, and began another order with the following: "When the undersigned accepted the appointment from the President of the United States of the position now held, he was ready to face the daily practice of law in federal courts with presumably competent lawyers. No one warned the undersigned that in many instances his responsibility would be the same as a person who supervised kindergarten."

Among his more notable cases were the sentencing of former Texas Attorney General Dan Morales (for mail fraud and filing false tax returns) and the trial of Gary Paul Karr for federal wire fraud (in connection with the kidnapping and murders of atheist Madalyn Murray O'Hair and her son and granddaughter). Sparks also heard the Karl Rove & Co. v Thornburgh case in 1993. This case found its way into court following a dispute over payment of fundraising expenses by the failed Republican Senate campaign of Dick Thornburgh. Sparks ruled that Rove's company could recoup roughly $180,000 in bills from the Thornburgh campaign.

In 1994 Sparks ruled in favor of Steve Jackson Games against the United States Secret Service (Steve Jackson Games, Inc. v. United States Secret Service). The latter had raided Jackson's offices and seized computers, searching for a sensitive file that one of Jackson's employees may have posted. The Electronic Frontier Foundation helped with the lawsuit, and Sparks ruled that the Secret Service had acted in a too heavy-handed manner.

In 1998 Sparks issued stays of execution for Joseph Stanley Faulder and Danny Lee Barber, holding that the Texas Board of Pardons and Paroles failed to provide due process in considering their requests for clemency.

He received the Trial Judge of the Year from the Texas Chapter of the Board of Trial Advocates in 2005. In 2010, he became the second honoree in the history of the American College of Trial Lawyers' Sandra Day O'Connor Award. The award "is to be given from time to time to a judge, either federal or state, who has demonstrated exemplary judicial independence in the performance of his or her duties, sometimes in difficult or even dangerous circumstances."

In 2006 he handled a case involving the Texas Republican Party's effort to get former Congressman Tom DeLay's name removed from the ballot in the 2006 Congressional Election. DeLay won the Republican primary election in March, but resigned from Congress in early April during a corruption scandal. However, since Texas law states that the name of a candidate who "withdraws" from a race after the primary must remain on the ballot, Texas Democrats filed a lawsuit to prevent Republicans from nominating another candidate. Republicans argued that DeLay did not "withdraw" from the race but instead made himself ineligible to be elected by changing his voter registration from Texas to Virginia, therefore allowing Republicans to name a replacement. On July 6, Judge Sparks ruled that DeLay's name must remain on the ballot.

In 2007, Justice Sparks ruled in a landmark settlement that greatly improved conditions for immigrant children and their families who were being held in the T. Don Hutto Residential Center operated by the Corrections Corporation of America (CCA) under contract with the U.S. Immigration and Customs Enforcement (ICE). Dozens of children were released from the facility in Taylor, Texas with their families as a result of the litigation. In response to the harsh treatment of young children in T. Don Hutto, Judge Sparks established "the government would have to establish clear rules for how to detain families safely and humanely. And although officials at Hutto might be making changes now, he noted, didn’t Lawrence have a feeling it was merely because the defendants knew, on account of the lawsuit, that 'the hammer was coming down?" He said that he was beginning to wonder who was in charge "out there, either C.C.A. or the government. It’s very troubling to me."

In 2009, Sparks heard Fisher v. University of Texas, a case challenging the admissions policy of the University of Texas at Austin. He upheld UT's policy under Grutter v. Bollinger.

In 2012 the court commemorated his 20 years served on the federal bench and marked the occasion with a portrait painted by artist Michele Rushworth.

=== Personal life and death ===
His great-grandfather and his grandfather were also named Sam Sparks; the former was sheriff of Bell County, Texas, and the latter succeeded him in 1897. This Sam Sparks became president of the Texas Sheriff's Association in 1903 and the Texas state treasurer in 1906.

He was married to Arden Reed Sparks, until she died in 1990. He married his second wife, Melinda Echols, formerly of Fort Worth, in 1995.

Sparks died on September 17, 2025, at the age of 85.

Legal offices
| Preceded by Seat established by 104 Stat. 5089 | Judge of the United States District Court for the Western District of Texas; 1991–2017 | Succeeded by Jason K. Pulliam |
