= Leon Schydlower =

American judge (born 1971)

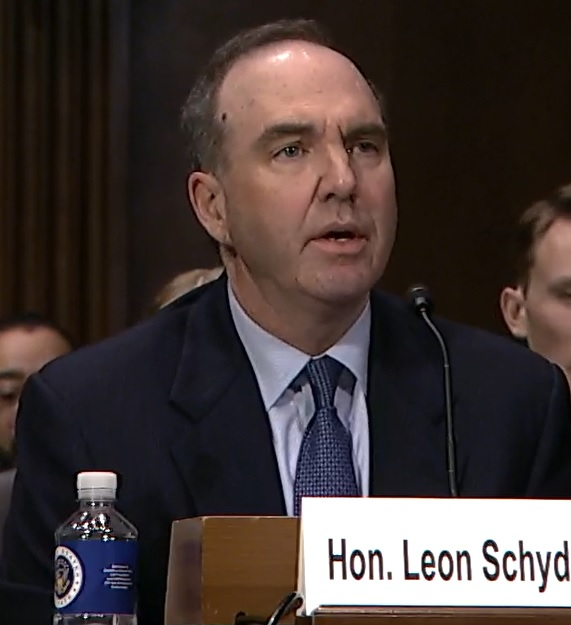

Judge of the United States District Court for the Western District of Texas
- Incumbent
- Assumed office March 26, 2024
- Appointed by: Joe Biden
- Preceded by: Frank Montalvo

Magistrate Judge of the United States District Court for the Western District of Texas
- In office December 1, 2015 – March 26, 2024

Personal details
- Born: 1971 (age 54–55) Long Beach, California, U.S.
- Party: Democratic
- Education: University of Texas at Austin (BA, JD)

Military service
- Allegiance: United States
- Branch/service: United States Navy Judge Advocate General's Corps (1996–1998); United States Navy Reserve (2000–2004); United States Air Force Reserve (2010–Present)
- Rank: Lieutenant Colonel
- Unit: 49th Wing; 35th Fighter Wing
- Awards: Meritorious Service Medal (with Bronze Oak Leaf Cluster); Navy and Marine Corps Commendation Medal

Leon Schydlower (born 1971) is an American lawyer who has served as a United States district judge of the United States District Court for the Western District of Texas since 2024. He previously served as a United States magistrate judge of the same court from 2015 to 2024.

== Education ==
Schydlower's father is an immigrant from Cuba. In 1989, Schydlower graduated from Hanks High School in eastern El Paso. Schydlower received a Bachelor of Arts from the University of Texas at Austin in 1993 and a Juris Doctor from the University of Texas School of Law in 1995.

== Career ==
From 1996 to 1998, Schydlower served as a trial attorney on active duty in the United States Navy Judge Advocate General's Corps. He was in the United States Navy Reserve from 2000 to 2004 and has served in the U.S. Air Force Reserve Judge Advocate General's Corps since 2010, where he holds the rank of lieutenant colonel. From 1998 to 2000, he worked as a special assistant United States attorney in the U.S. Attorney's Office for the District of Hawaii. From 2000 to 2002, he was a partner and associate at El Paso's Kemp Smith law firm. From 2002 to 2015, he was a sole practitioner. From 2015 to 2024, he served as a United States magistrate judge of the United States District Court for the Western District of Texas. He was sworn in and had a formal investiture on January 13, 2016.

=== Federal judicial service ===
On December 19, 2023, President Joe Biden announced his intent to nominate Schydlower to serve as a United States district judge of the United States District Court for the Western District of Texas. His nomination received support from Senators John Cornyn and Ted Cruz. On January 10, 2024, his nomination was sent to the Senate. President Biden nominated Schydlower to the seat vacated by Judge Philip Ray Martinez, who died on February 26, 2021. On January 24, 2024, a hearing on his nomination was held before the Senate Judiciary Committee. On February 7, 2024, his nomination was withdrawn and he was renominated to the seat vacated by Judge Frank Montalvo, who assumed senior status on December 1, 2022. On February 29, 2024, his nomination was reported out of committee by a 20–1 vote. On March 22, 2024, the United States Senate confirmed his nomination by a 90–8 vote. He received his judicial commission on March 26, 2024.

Legal offices
Preceded by Frank Montalvo	Judge of the United States District Court for the Western District of Texas; 2024–present	Incumbent
