= Judge McMillan =

Judge McMillan may refer to:

- James Bryan McMillan (1916–1995), judge of the United States District Court for the Western District of North Carolina
- Robert Johnston McMillan (1885–1941), judge of the United States District Court for the Western District of Texas

== See also ==
- Thomas Roberts McMillen (1916–2007), judge of the United States District Court for the Northern District of Illinois
- Theodore McMillian (1919–2006), judge of the Missouri Court of Appeals and of the United States Court of Appeals for the Eighth Circuit
