= Yeakel =

Yeakel is an English surname. Notable people with the surname include:

- Earl Leroy Yeakel III (born 1945), American judge
- Lynn Yeakel (1942–2022), American administrator and politician
