= David Briones =

American judge (born 1943)

Senior Judge of the United States District Court for the Western District of Texas
- Incumbent
- Assumed office February 26, 2009

Judge of the United States District Court for the Western District of Texas
- In office October 11, 1994 – February 26, 2009
- Appointed by: Bill Clinton
- Preceded by: Lucius Desha Bunton III
- Succeeded by: David C. Guaderrama

Personal details
- Born: February 26, 1943 (age 83) El Paso, Texas, U.S.
- Party: Democrat
- Education: University of Texas (BA, JD)

David Briones (born February 26, 1943) is a senior United States district judge of the United States District Court for the Western District of Texas.

== Education and career ==
Born in El Paso, Texas, Briones was in the United States Army from 1964 to 1966, then received a Bachelor of Arts degree from the University of Texas at El Paso in 1969 and a Juris Doctor from the University of Texas School of Law in 1971. He was in private practice in El Paso from 1971 to 1991. He was a judge on the El Paso County Court at Law Number One from 1991 to 1994.

=== Federal judicial service ===
On August 25, 1994, Briones was nominated by President Bill Clinton to a seat on the United States District Court for the Western District of Texas vacated by Lucius Desha Bunton. Briones was confirmed by the United States Senate on October 7, 1994, and received his commission on October 11, 1994. He assumed senior status on February 26, 2009. He was succeeded by Judge David C. Guaderrama

On December 10, 2019, Briones blocked President Donald Trump from using federal military funds for the border wall. On January 8, 2020, the United States Court of Appeals for the Fifth Circuit stayed Briones' nationwide injunction, pending disposition of the appeal.

== See also ==
- List of Hispanic and Latino American jurists
- National Emergency Concerning the Southern Border of the United States Democrat

== Notes ==
Legal offices
Preceded by Lucius Desha Bunton III	Judge of the United States District Court for the Western District of Texas; 1994–2009	Succeeded by David C. Guaderrama
