= John H. Wood Jr. =

American federal judge (1916–1979)

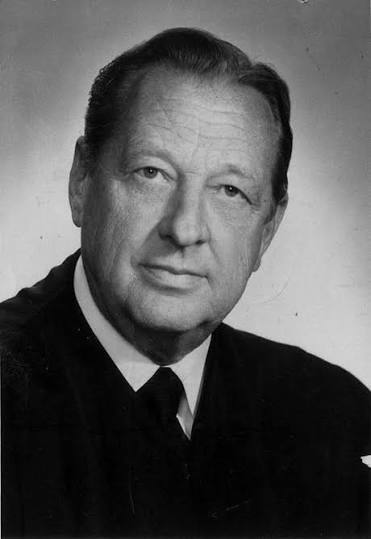

Judge of the United States District Court for the Western District of Texas
- In office December 1, 1970 – May 29, 1979
- Appointed by: Richard Nixon
- Preceded by: Seat established
- Succeeded by: Lucius Desha Bunton III

Personal details
- Born: John Howland Wood Jr. March 31, 1916 Rockport, Texas, U.S.
- Died: May 29, 1979 (aged 63) San Antonio, Texas, U.S.
- Cause of death: Assassination by gunshot
- Education: Thomas Jefferson High School
- Alma mater: St. Mary's University (BBA); Texas Law (LLB)

John Howland Wood Jr. (March 31, 1916 – May 29, 1979) was an American lawyer and judge from Texas. He served as a United States district judge of the United States District Court for the Western District of Texas in 1970 until his assassination in 1979. His murder was the first assassination of a federal judge in the 20th century.

== Early life and education ==
John Howland Wood Jr. was born on March 31, 1916 into a prominent pioneer Texan family in Rockport. His great-great-grandfather, John Howland Wood, settled in Texas in 1836 and founded the towns of Rockport and Woodsboro, and took part in the Texas Revolution and American Civil War. His grandfather was a popular Democratic sheriff of Bexar County. Wood's father, John H. Wood Sr., was also a lawyer. Wood attended Thomas Jefferson High School in San Antonio. He received his Bachelor of Business Administration degree from St. Mary's University, Texas in San Antonio in 1935 and his Bachelor of Laws from the University of Texas School of Law in Austin 1938.

== Career ==
Wood was in private practice in San Antonio from 1938 to 1970 with the law firm Beckmann, Stanard & Olson, except from 1944 to 1945, when he served as an ensign in the United States Navy during World War II. Wood was in the United States Naval Reserve from 1945 to 1954, as a lieutenant.

== Federal judicial service ==
Wood was nominated by President Richard Nixon on October 7, 1970, to the United States District Court for the Western District of Texas, to a new seat created by 84 Stat. 294. Confirmed by the United States Senate on November 25, 1970, he received his commission on December 1, 1970. He served until his assassination in San Antonio on May 29, 1979.

== Death ==
On May 29, 1979, Judge Wood was shot dead in San Antonio from a high-powered rifle as he stood at the door of his automobile. He was struck in the small of the back (the middle of the lower back) and the bullet lodged near the upper part of his chest. Wood, known as "Maximum John" for his harsh sentencing of drug traffickers, was assassinated by Charles Harrelson in a contract killing placed by Texas drug lord Jamiel Chagra, who was awaiting trial before the judge. Wood's killing was the first assassination of a federal judge in the 20th century. Two other federal judges were assassinated in the 1980s, Richard J. Daronco in 1988 and Robert Smith Vance in 1989. President Jimmy Carter described his assassination as "an assault on our very system of justice."

On 30 June 1980 Joseph Marcello, underboss of the New Orleans crime family, was subpoenaed by a grand jury in relation to the killing of Judge Wood in Texas. The jury was played a tape of Marcello talking about what he called a "third-hand rumor" that Lebanese brothers "had some thing to do with killing that judge in El Paso". Marcello claimed not to remember the conversation. On 21 April 21, 1982, he was indicted for perjury before the grand jury, being released on bail set at $50,000.

== Honors ==
John H. Wood Middle School, in San Antonio is named in his honor. The federal courthouse in San Antonio is also named for Wood.

== Media ==
In Cormac McCarthy's 2005 novel No Country for Old Men (set in 1980), the sheriff states, "Here a while back in San Antonio they shot and killed a federal judge", referencing the murder of Judge Wood by Charles Harrelson. The killer's son Woody Harrelson starred in the 2007 film adaptation of the novel, which premiered two months after Charles Harrelson's death.

The reality TV shows City Confidential and FBI: The Untold Stories did episodes on Wood's murder.

== See also ==
- List of assassinated American politicians
- List of United States federal judges killed in office

== Sources ==
Legal offices
New seat	Judge of the United States District Court for the Western District of Texas; 1970–1979	Succeeded by Lucius Desha Bunton III
