= David C. Guaderrama =

American judge (born 1954)

David Campos Guaderrama
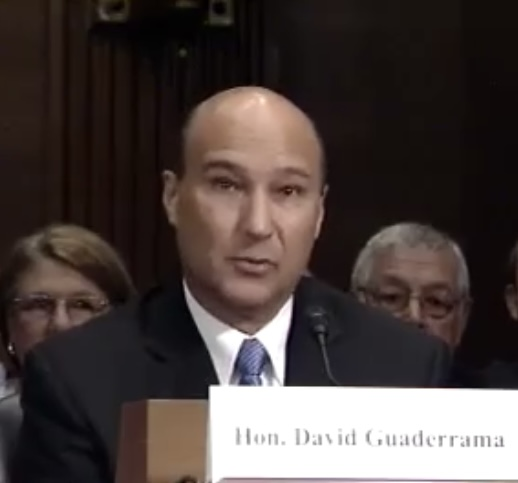

Senior Judge of the United States District Court for the Western District of Texas
- Incumbent
- Assumed office May 27, 2023

Judge of the United States District Court for the Western District of Texas
- In office April 30, 2012 – May 27, 2023
- Appointed by: Barack Obama
- Preceded by: David Briones
- Succeeded by: Chris Wolfe

Magistrate Judge of the United States District Court for the Western District of Texas
- In office October 2010 – April 30, 2012

Personal details
- Born: David Campos Guaderrama Las Cruces, New Mexico, U.S.
- Party: Democratic
- Education: New Mexico State University (BA); University of Notre Dame (JD)

David Campos Guaderrama is a Senior United States district judge of the United States District Court for the Western District of Texas.

== Early life and education ==
Guaderrama was born in Las Cruces, New Mexico and spent the early part of his life in Deming, New Mexico. His family moved to El Paso, Texas, in 1966, where he graduated from Cathedral High School in 1972. Guaderrama received his Bachelor of Arts degree in 1975 from New Mexico State University and his Juris Doctor in 1979 from the University of Notre Dame Law School.

== Career ==
He entered solo private practice in 1979 and became a partner of Guaderrama and Guaderrama from 1980 to 1986. He served as Chief Public Defender of El Paso County, Texas, from 1987 to 1994. Guaderrama served as District Judge of the 243rd District Court of Texas in El Paso County from 1995 to 2010. Judges of Texas district courts are elected in partisan elections: Guaderrama ran under the Democratic Party banner.

=== Federal judicial service ===
In October 2010, he was appointed magistrate judge of the United States District Court for the Western District of Texas.

On September 14, 2011, President Barack Obama nominated Guaderrama to be a United States district judge of the United States District Court for the Western District of Texas, to the seat vacated by Judge David Briones who assumed senior status on February 26, 2009. On November 2, 2011, he received a hearing before the Senate Judiciary Committee and his nomination was reported to the floor on December 1, 2011. Guaderrama's nomination was confirmed by voice vote on April 26, 2012. He received his commission on April 30, 2012. He assumed senior status on May 27, 2023.

== See also ==
- List of Hispanic and Latino American jurists

Legal offices
Preceded by David Briones	Judge of the United States District Court for the Western District of Texas; 2012–2023	Succeeded by Chris Wolfe
