= Jason K. Pulliam =

American judge (born 1971)

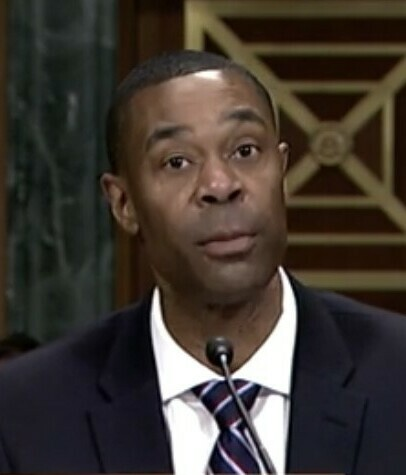

Judge of the United States District Court for the Western District of Texas
- Incumbent
- Assumed office August 5, 2019
- Appointed by: Donald Trump
- Preceded by: Sam Sparks

Associate Justice of the Fourth Court of Appeals of Texas
- In office January 8, 2015 – December 31, 2016
- Appointed by: Rick Perry
- Preceded by: Sandee Marion
- Succeeded by: Irene Rios

Personal details
- Born: 1971 (age 54–55) Brooklyn, New York, U.S.
- Party: Republican
- Education: Brooklyn College (BA, MA); Texas Southern University (JD)

Military service
- Allegiance: United States
- Branch/service: United States Marine Corps
- Years of service: 2000–2004
- Rank: Captain
- Unit: United States Marine Corps Judge Advocate Division
- Awards: See list: Navy and Marine Corps Achievement Medal National Defense Service Medal

Jason Kenneth Pulliam (born 1971) is a United States district judge of the United States District Court for the Western District of Texas.

== Education ==
Pulliam received a Bachelor of Arts, cum laude, and a Master of Arts from Brooklyn College. He received his Juris Doctor, cum laude, from the Thurgood Marshall School of Law at Texas Southern University.

== Career ==
Pulliam served in the United States Marine Corps and was a Judge Advocate from 2000 to 2004.

From 2017 to 2019, Pulliam was of counsel with Prichard Young, where his practice focused on complex civil litigation matters.

=== Judicial career ===
Pulliam served as a Justice on Texas' Fourth Court of Appeals after being appointed to the court by Governor Rick Perry on January 8, 2015. His term ended on December 31, 2016. He also previously served as a judge for the Bexar County Court at Law, handling both civil and criminal matters.

==== Federal judicial service ====
On March 1, 2019, President Donald Trump announced his intent to nominate Pulliam to serve as a United States district judge for the United States District Court for the Western District of Texas. President Trump nominated Pulliam to the seat vacated by Sam Sparks, who assumed senior status on December 31, 2017. On March 5, 2019, his nomination was sent to the Senate. On May 22, 2019, a hearing on his nomination was held before the Senate Judiciary Committee. On June 20, 2019, his nomination was reported out of committee by a 12–10 vote. On July 30, 2019, the United States Senate invoked cloture on his nomination by a 54–34 vote. On July 31, 2019, his nomination was confirmed by a 54–36 vote. He received his judicial commission on August 5, 2019.

== Personal life ==
On August 23, 2012, Pulliam and court bailiff Charles Cook witnessed a mugging and apprehended two suspects on foot until police arrived. Two men were accused of stealing an iPhone and iPad outside of a Starbucks. Bystanders tried to catch them, however the two suspects pepper-sprayed them. The suspects ran to a car parked near the Majestic Theatre and drove away, however Cook and Pulliam chased and stopped the car about a half a block away and detained the two occupants until police arrived.

== See also ==
- List of African-American federal judges
- List of African-American jurists
- List of first minority male lawyers and judges in Texas

Legal offices
Preceded by Sandee Marion	Justice of the Texas Fourth Court of Appeals; 2015–2016	Succeeded by Irene Rios
Preceded by Sam Sparks	Judge of the United States District Court for the Western District of Texas; 2019–present	Incumbent
