= Dorwin Wallace Suttle =

American judge

Senior Judge of the United States District Court for the Western District of Texas
- In office October 10, 1979 – September 29, 2001

Judge of the United States District Court for the Western District of Texas
- In office July 2, 1964 – October 10, 1979
- Appointed by: Lyndon B. Johnson
- Preceded by: Ben Herbert Rice Jr.
- Succeeded by: Clyde Frederick Shannon Jr.

Personal details
- Born: Dorwin Wallace Suttle; July 16, 1906 Knox County, Indiana
- Died: September 29, 2001 (aged 95) San Antonio, Texas
- Education: University of Texas School of Law (LL.B.)

Dorwin Wallace Suttle (July 16, 1906 – September 29, 2001) was a United States district judge of the United States District Court for the Western District of Texas.

== Education and career ==
Born in Knox County, Indiana, Suttle received a Bachelor of Laws from the University of Texas School of Law in 1928. He was in private practice in Uvalde, Texas from 1928 to 1964. He was city attorney of Uvalde in 1929. He was county attorney of Uvalde County from 1929 to 1936. He was clerk to Vice President John Nance Garner from 1937 to 1941. He was city attorney of Uvalde from 1937 to 1941. He served in the United States Navy during World War II.

== Federal judicial service ==
Suttle was nominated by President Lyndon B. Johnson on April 11, 1964, to a seat on the United States District Court for the Western District of Texas vacated by Judge Ben Herbert Rice Jr. He was confirmed by the United States Senate on June 30, 1964, and received his commission on July 2, 1964. He assumed senior status on October 10, 1979. Suttle served in that capacity until his death on September 29, 2001, in San Antonio, Texas.

== Sources ==
Legal offices
Preceded by Ben Herbert Rice Jr.	Judge of the United States District Court for the Western District of Texas; 1964–1979	Succeeded by Clyde Frederick Shannon Jr.
