= Andrew B. Davis =

American judge (born 1985)

Andrew Bray Davis
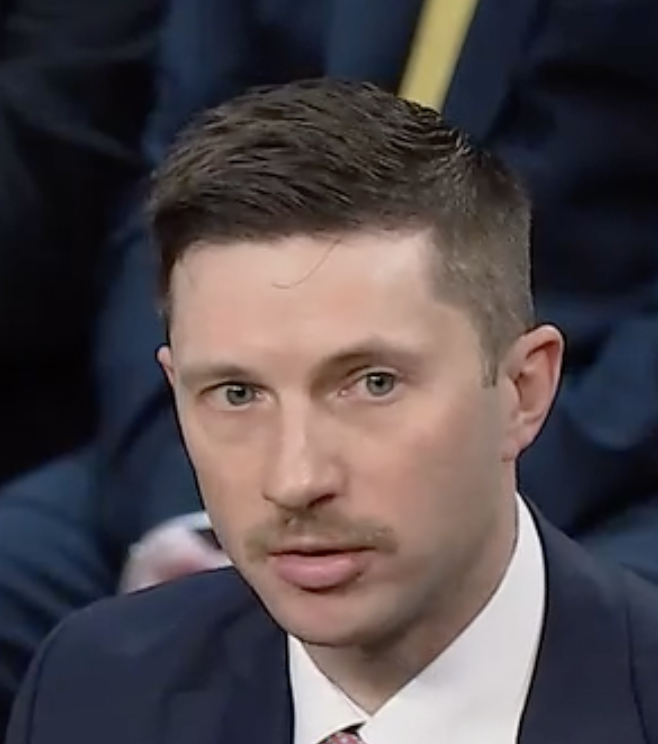
- Davis in 2026

Judge of the United States District Court for the Western District of Texas
- Incumbent
- Assuming office April 30, 2026
- Appointed by: Donald Trump
- Succeeding: Earl Leroy Yeakel III

Personal details
- Born: Andrew Bray Davis; 1985 (age 40–41) Madison, Wisconsin, U.S.
- Education: Rice University (BA); Columbia University (JD)

Andrew Bray Davis (known professionally as Andrew Davis; born 1985) serves as a United States district judge of the United States District Court for the Western District of Texas. Prior to his appointment to the bench, Davis was an attorney in private practice serving as a partner at the law firm of Lehotsky Keller Cohn LLP.

== Early life and education ==
Davis was born in 1985 in Madison, Wisconsin. He received his Bachelor of Arts degree in 2008 from Rice University and his Juris Doctor in 2012 from Columbia Law School. He served as a law clerk for Judge Sidney A. Fitzwater of the United States District Court for the Northern District of Texas and Judge Reena Raggi of the United States Court of Appeals for the Second Circuit.

== Career ==
Davis served as a partner at the law firm of Lehotsky Keller Kohn LLP at their Austin office until his appointment to the federal bench. He previously served as chief counsel to United States Senator Ted Cruz and as the assistant solicitor general of Texas. Earlier in his career, he served as a trial and appellate litigator at Gibson, Dunn & Crutcher LLP in Washington, D.C.

=== Federal judicial service ===
On January 6, 2026, President Donald Trump announced his intention to nominate Davis to an unspecified seat on the United States District Court for the Western District of Texas. On January 29, 2026, Trump formally nominated Davis to the seat on the Western District of Texas vacated by Judge Earl Leroy Yeakel III. On February 6, 2026, a hearing on his nomination was held before the Senate Judiciary Committee. On March 5, 2026, his nomination was reported from the Judiciary Committee by a 12–10 party-line vote. On April 16, 2026, the Senate invoked cloture on his nomination by a 49–48 vote. On April 20, 2026, his nomination was confirmed by a 47–46 vote. He received his judicial commission on April 30, 2026.

Legal offices
Preceded by Earl Leroy Yeakel III	Judge of the United States District Court for the Western District of Texas; 2026–present	Designate
