= DuVal West =

American judge

Senior Judge of the United States District Court for the Western District of Texas
- In office November 30, 1931 – May 13, 1949

Judge of the United States District Court for the Western District of Texas
- In office December 21, 1916 – November 30, 1931
- Appointed by: Woodrow Wilson
- Preceded by: Thomas Sheldon Maxey
- Succeeded by: Robert Johnston McMillan

Personal details
- Born: DuVal West; November 13, 1861 Austin, Texas
- Died: May 13, 1949 (aged 87) San Antonio, Texas
- Parent(s): Charles S. West; Florence Duval West
- Education: TMI Episcopal; Cumberland School of Law (LL.B.)

DuVal West (November 13, 1861 – May 13, 1949) was a United States district judge of the United States District Court for the Western District of Texas.

== Education and career ==
Born in Austin, Texas, West attended the West Texas Military Academy (later the Texas Military Institute, now TMI Episcopal) and received a Bachelor of Laws from Cumberland School of Law (then part of Cumberland University, now part of Samford University) in 1890. He was a deputy clerk for the United States District Court for the Western District of Texas from 1884 to 1885. He was chief deputy marshal for the United States District Court for the Western District of Texas from 1886 to 1888. He was in private practice in San Antonio, Texas from 1890 to 1916. He was an Assistant United States Attorney of the Western District of Texas from 1893 to 1897. He was in the First Texas Volunteer Infantry in 1898. He was personal representative of President Wilson in Mexico in 1915.

== Federal judicial service ==
West was nominated by President Woodrow Wilson on December 19, 1916, to a seat on the United States District Court for the Western District of Texas vacated by Judge Thomas Sheldon Maxey. He was confirmed by the United States Senate on December 21, 1916, and received his commission the same day. He assumed senior status on November 30, 1931. West served in that capacity until his death on May 13, 1949, in San Antonio.

== Sources ==
Legal offices
Preceded by Thomas Sheldon Maxey	Judge of the United States District Court for the Western District of Texas; 1916–1931	Succeeded by Robert Johnston McMillan
