= Earl Leroy Yeakel III =

American judge (born 1945)

Judge of the United States District Court for the Western District of Texas
- In office July 29, 2003 – May 1, 2023
- Appointed by: George W. Bush
- Preceded by: James Robertson Nowlin
- Succeeded by: Andrew B. Davis

Personal details
- Born: Earl Leroy Yeakel III; April 18, 1945 (age 81) Oklahoma City, Oklahoma, U.S.
- Education: University of Texas (BA, JD); University of Virginia (LLM)

Earl Leroy Yeakel III (born April 18, 1945), also known as Lee Yeakel, is a former United States district judge of the United States District Court for the Western District of Texas.

== Biography ==
Born in Oklahoma City, Oklahoma, Yeakel received a Bachelor of Arts degree from the University of Texas in 1966 and a Juris Doctor from the University of Texas School of Law in 1969. He served in the military from 1967 to 1970. He was in private practice in Austin, Texas, from 1969 to 1998. He was Justice of the Texas Court of Appeals for the Third District from 1998 to 2003 and chief justice of that court in 1998. He received a Master of Laws from the University of Virginia School of Law in 2001.

=== Federal judicial service ===
Yeakel was nominated by President George W. Bush on May 1, 2003, to a seat vacated by Judge James Robertson Nowlin. who had taken Senior status. He was confirmed by the Senate on July 28, 2003, receiving his commission the next day. He retired from active service on May 1, 2023. He since joined a law firm, King & Spalding, after he retired from the bench.

=== Abortion rulings ===
On October 28, 2013, Yeakel ruled that abortion restrictions enacted by the state of Texas were unconstitutional, in the case of Whole Woman's Health v. Hellerstedt. Yeakel wrote: "The admitting-privileges provision of House Bill 2 does not bear a rational relationship to the legitimate right of the state in preserving and promoting fetal life or a woman's health and, in any event, places a substantial obstacle in the path of a woman seeking an abortion of a nonviable fetus and is thus an undue burden to her." Three days later, Yeakel's order was mostly overturned by a three-judge panel of the 5th Circuit Court of Appeals in New Orleans The part of the law requiring doctors in abortion facilities have admitting privileges at local hospitals was unanimously reinstated by the panel. Only one part of Yeakel's order remained and that part was where the order prevents the state from enforcing the FDA protocol for abortion-inducing drugs in cases where the woman is between 50 and 63 days into her pregnancy. On August 29, 2014, in response to a second lawsuit, Judge Yeakel ruled again that abortion restrictions in Texas H. B. 2 imposed an "undue burden" upon women seeking pre-viability abortions and upon abortion providers, and declared several provisions of the law unconstitutional.

Yeakel's rulings were upheld by the United States Supreme Court in June 2016.

In March 2020, Texas Attorney General Ken Paxton announced that abortion providers were covered by a state order that required postponement of non-urgent medical procedures to preserve hospital beds and equipment during the COVID-19 pandemic. On March 30, 2020, Yeakel ruled that Paxton's action "prevents Texas women from exercising what the Supreme Court has declared is their fundamental constitutional right to terminate a pregnancy before a fetus is viable". On March 31, 2020, the United States Court of Appeals for the Fifth Circuit issued a stay of Judge Yeakel's ruling.

A three-judge panel of the U.S. Court of Appeals for the Fifth Circuit in New Orleans on April 7, 2020, overturned Judge Yeakel's restraining order in Planned Parenthood v. Abbott to halt enforcement of the Texas governor's abortion ban issued as part of the COVID-19 crisis health mandates. The Fifth Circuit stated that Judge Yeakel failed to apply the standard of Jacobson v. Massachusetts, a 1905 case that supports judicial deference to the political branches in times of a pandemic.

=== Mask mandate bans ===
On November 10, 2021, Yeakel ruled that Texas governor Greg Abbott's ban on mask mandates violates the Americans With Disabilities Act. Yeakel noted that over 211,000 students in Texas tested positive for COVID-19 between the beginning of the 2021–22 school year and October 31, 2021. Yeakel's ruling will allow school districts to impose mask mandates and disallow Texas AG Ken Paxton from defunding those school districts. Yeakel's ruling was vacated by the 5th circuit on November 24.

=== Kocurek assassination attempt ===
Yeakel was the presiding judge over Chimene Onyeri's attempted assassination of Travis County judge Julie Kocurek after she previously sentenced him for probation violation. Just before Kocurek was to sentence him, Onyeri attempted to kill her and her son as they were returning home from a football game at his high school. The investigation of the attempt unveiled a criminal theft and fraud enterprise Onyeri ran. After his many associates testified of his schemes, a federal jury convicted Onyeri on 17 counts of fraud, theft, racketeering and attempted murder and sentenced him to life in prison.

== Sources ==
Legal offices
Preceded by James Robertson Nowlin	Judge of the United States District Court for the Western District of Texas; 2003–2023	Succeeded by Andrew B. Davis
