= Harry Lee Hudspeth =

American judge (1935–2024)

Senior Judge of the United States District Court for the Western District of Texas
- In office June 30, 2001 – January 31, 2016

Chief Judge of the United States District Court for the Western District of Texas
- In office 1992–1999
- Preceded by: Lucius Desha Bunton III
- Succeeded by: James Robertson Nowlin

Judge of the United States District Court for the Western District of Texas
- In office November 27, 1979 – June 30, 2001
- Appointed by: Jimmy Carter
- Preceded by: Adrian Anthony Spears
- Succeeded by: Alia Moses

Magistrate Judge of the United States District Court for the Western District of Texas
- In office 1977–1979

Personal details
- Born: December 28, 1935 Dallas, Texas, U.S.
- Died: April 7, 2024 (aged 88) Austin, Texas, U.S.
- Education: University of Texas at Austin (AB, JD)

Military service
- Branch/service: United States Marine Corps Reserve
- Years of service: 1958–1959
- Rank: Corporal

Harry Lee Hudspeth (December 28, 1935 – April 7, 2024) was a United States district judge of the United States District Court for the Western District of Texas.

== Education and career ==
Born in Dallas, Texas, Hudspeth received an Artium Baccalaureus degree from the University of Texas at Austin in 1955 and a Juris Doctor from the University of Texas School of Law in 1958. While a student at UT, he was a member of the Alpha Phi Omega Service Fraternity and the Friar Society. He was a corporal in the United States Marine Corps Reserve from 1958 to 1959. He was a trial attorney of the United States Department of Justice in Washington, D.C. from 1959 to 1962, and was then an Assistant United States Attorney of the Western District of Texas from 1962 to 1969. He was in private practice in El Paso, Texas from 1969 to 1977. From 1977 to 1979, he was a United States Magistrate for the Western District of Texas.

== Federal judicial service ==
On October 11, 1979, Hudspeth was nominated by President Jimmy Carter to a seat on the United States District Court for the Western District of Texas vacated by Judge Adrian Anthony Spears. Hudspeth was confirmed by the United States Senate on November 26, 1979, and received his commission on November 27, 1979. He served as Chief Judge from 1992 to 1999. He assumed senior status on June 30, 2001. He retired from active service on January 31, 2016.

== Death ==
Hudspeth died in Austin, Texas on April 7, 2024, at the age of 88.

== Sources ==
Legal offices
Preceded by Adrian Anthony Spears	Judge of the United States District Court for the Western District of Texas; 1979–2001	Succeeded by Alia Moses
Preceded by Lucius Desha Bunton III	Chief Judge of the United States District Court for the Western District of Texas; 1992–1999	Succeeded by James Robertson Nowlin
