= John E. Otto =

FBI director (1938–2020)

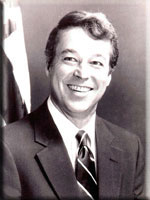

Director of the Federal Bureau of Investigation
- Acting
- In office May 26, 1987 – November 2, 1987
- President: Ronald Reagan
- Preceded by: William H. Webster
- Succeeded by: William S. Sessions

Personal details
- Born: December 18, 1938 St. Paul, Minnesota, U.S.
- Died: April 22, 2020 (aged 81) Norman, Oklahoma, U.S.
- Party: Republican
- Education: St. Cloud State University (BS); University of Minnesota (attended)

John E. Otto (December 18, 1938 – April 22, 2020) was the acting director of the FBI in 1987.

A native of St. Paul, Minnesota, Otto served in the Marine Corps and attended St. Cloud State College, where he earned a B.S. in 1960, followed by four years of graduate study in educational administration at the University of Minnesota. As a grad student, he worked as a deputy sheriff for Ramsey County, Minnesota and for the Arden Hills, Minnesota police department, while teaching at a junior high school in St. Paul.

In 1964, Otto joined the FBI, moving up through the ranks to inspector and supervisor positions. After serving as special agent in charge of the Minneapolis and then Chicago field offices, Otto was promoted into management positions, becoming executive assistant director of Law Enforcement Services in 1981.

In 1987, Otto became acting director of the FBI when director William H. Webster was appointed to Director of Central Intelligence, and stepped down when William Sessions gained Senate approval.

In 1990, Sessions awarded Otto the first Medal of Meritorious Achievement. On his retirement the same year, Otto became a security official for Delta Air Lines.

He died three days before another Acting FBI Director, James B. Adams, almost 2 months before FBI Director, William S. Sessions, and 5 months after another Acting FBI Director, William Ruckelshaus.

Government offices
Preceded by William H. Webster	Director of the Federal Bureau of Investigation; Acting; 1987	Succeeded by William S. Sessions
