= Walter Angus Keeling =

American judge

Judge of the United States District Court for the Western District of Texas
- In office January 28, 1942 – January 22, 1945
- Appointed by: Franklin D. Roosevelt
- Preceded by: Robert Johnston McMillan
- Succeeded by: Ben Herbert Rice Jr.

31st Attorney General of Texas
- In office December 1921 – January 1925
- Governor: Pat Morris Neff
- Preceded by: Calvin Maples Cureton
- Succeeded by: Dan Moody

Personal details
- Born: Walter Angus Keeling; November 22, 1873 Kosse, Texas, U.S.
- Died: January 22, 1945 (aged 71) San Antonio, Texas, U.S.
- Education: University of Texas School of Law (LL.B.)

Walter Angus Keeling (November 22, 1873 – January 22, 1945) was a United States district judge of the United States District Court for the Western District of Texas.

== Education and career ==
Born in Kosse, Texas, Keeling received a Bachelor of Laws from the University of Texas School of Law in 1897. He entered private practice in Groesbeck, Texas in 1897. He was an assistant county attorney of Limestone County, Texas from 1898 to 1902. He was county attorney of Limestone County from 1904 to 1908. He was a County Judge of Limestone County from 1908 to 1912. He was an assistant attorney general of Texas from 1912 to 1918. He was first assistant attorney general of Texas from 1918 to 1921. He was the Attorney General of Texas from 1921 to 1925. He was in private practice in Texas from 1925 to 1942.

== Federal judicial service ==
Keeling was nominated by President Franklin D. Roosevelt on January 16, 1942, to a seat on the United States District Court for the Western District of Texas vacated by Judge Robert Johnston McMillan. He was confirmed by the United States Senate on January 26, 1942, and received his commission on January 28, 1942. Keeling served in that capacity until his death on January 22, 1945, in San Antonio, Texas.

== Sources ==
Party political offices
Preceded by Calvin Maples Cureton	Democratic nominee for Texas Attorney General; 1922	Succeeded by Dan Moody
Legal offices
Preceded by Calvin Maples Cureton	Attorney General of Texas; 1921–1925	Succeeded by Dan Moody
Preceded by Robert Johnston McMillan	Judge of the United States District Court for the Western District of Texas; 1942–1945	Succeeded by Ben Herbert Rice Jr.
