= Jack Roberts (judge) =

American judge

Senior Judge of the United States District Court for the Western District of Texas
- In office May 1, 1980 – February 27, 1988

Chief Judge of the United States District Court for the Western District of Texas
- In office 1979–1980
- Preceded by: Adrian Anthony Spears
- Succeeded by: William S. Sessions

Judge of the United States District Court for the Western District of Texas
- In office July 22, 1966 – May 1, 1980
- Appointed by: Lyndon B. Johnson
- Preceded by: Homer Thornberry
- Succeeded by: James Robertson Nowlin

Personal details
- Born: Jack Roberts; February 18, 1910 Sweetwater, Texas, U.S.
- Died: February 27, 1988 (aged 78) Austin, Texas, U.S.
- Education: University of Texas School of Law (LL.B.)

Jack Roberts (February 18, 1910 – February 27, 1988) was a United States district judge of the United States District Court for the Western District of Texas.

== Education and career ==
Born in Sweetwater, Texas, Roberts received a Bachelor of Laws from the University of Texas School of Law in 1933. He was a United States Army Staff Sergeant in the Intelligence Corps during World War II, from 1942 to 1946. He was district attorney of Austin, Texas from 1946 to 1948. He was a judge of the 126th District Court from 1948 to 1966.

== Federal judicial service ==
Roberts was nominated by President Lyndon B. Johnson on June 28, 1966, to a seat on the United States District Court for the Western District of Texas vacated by Judge Homer Thornberry. He was confirmed by the United States Senate on July 22, 1966, and received his commission the same day. He served as Chief Judge from 1979 to 1980. He assumed senior status on May 1, 1980. Roberts served in that capacity until his death on February 27, 1988, in Austin.

== Sources ==
Legal offices
Preceded by Homer Thornberry	Judge of the United States District Court for the Western District of Texas; 1966–1980	Succeeded by James Robertson Nowlin
Preceded by Adrian Anthony Spears	Chief Judge of the United States District Court for the Western District of Texas; 1979–1980	Succeeded by William S. Sessions
