= William S. Sessions =

American judge (1930–2020)

Bill Sessions
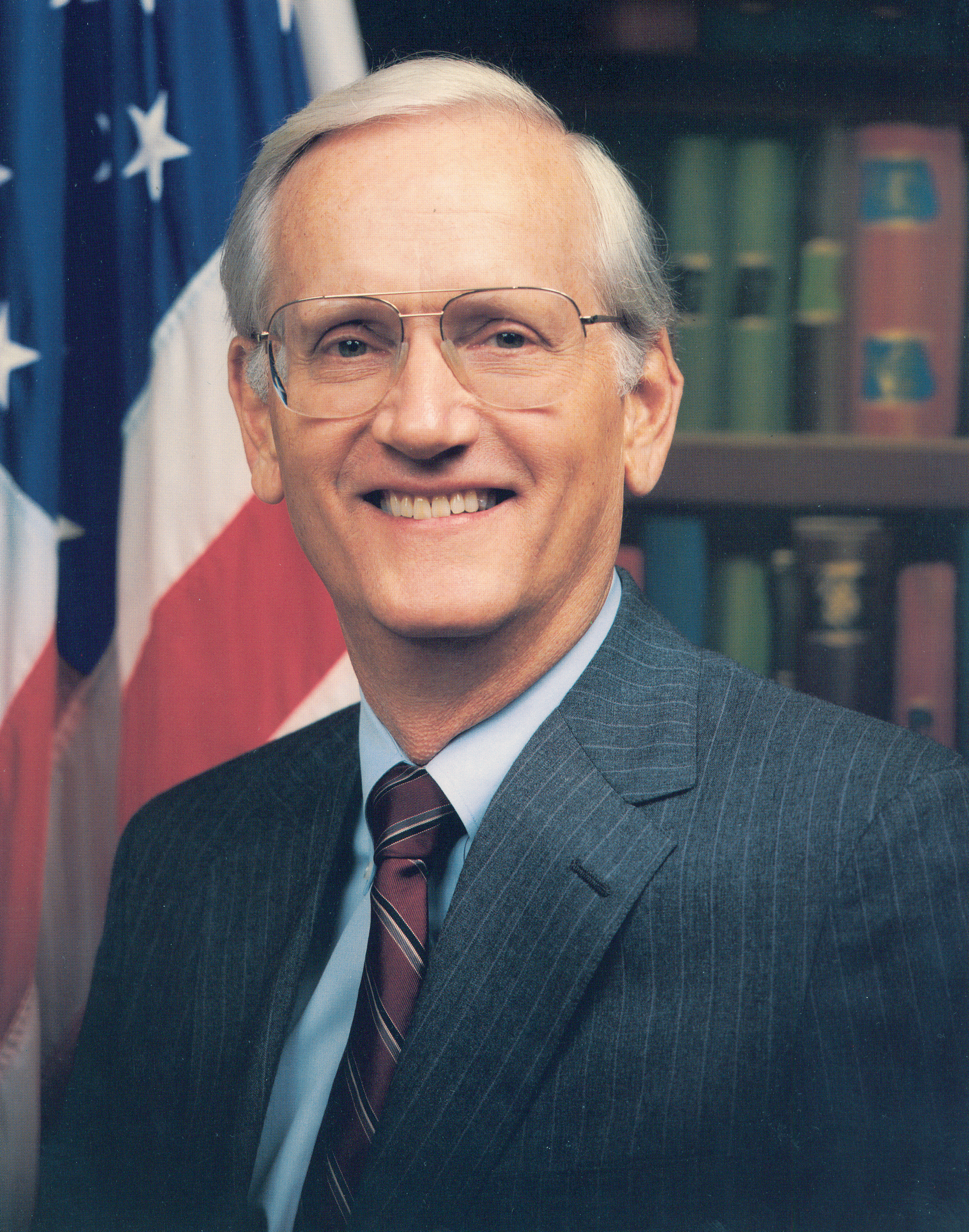

4th Director of the Federal Bureau of Investigation
- In office November 2, 1987 – July 19, 1993
- President: Ronald Reagan; George H. W. Bush; Bill Clinton
- Deputy: Floyd I. Clarke
- Preceded by: John E. Otto (acting)
- Succeeded by: Floyd I. Clarke (acting)

Chief Judge of the United States District Court for the Western District of Texas
- In office 1980–1987
- Preceded by: Jack Roberts
- Succeeded by: Lucius Desha Bunton III

Judge of the United States District Court for the Western District of Texas
- In office December 20, 1974 – November 1, 1987
- Appointed by: Gerald Ford
- Preceded by: Ernest Allen Guinn
- Succeeded by: Emilio M. Garza

United States Attorney for the Western District of Texas
- In office 1971–1974
- Appointed by: Richard Nixon
- Preceded by: Segal Wheatley
- Succeeded by: Hugh Shovlin

Personal details
- Born: William Steele Sessions; May 27, 1930 Fort Smith, Arkansas, U.S.
- Died: June 12, 2020 (aged 90) San Antonio, Texas, U.S.
- Party: Republican
- Spouse: Alice Lewis (m. 1952; died 2019)
- Children: 4, including Pete
- Education: Baylor University (BA, LLB)

William Steele Sessions (May 27, 1930 – June 12, 2020) was an American attorney and jurist who served as a United States district judge of the United States District Court for the Western District of Texas and the fourth Director of the Federal Bureau of Investigation. Sessions served as FBI director from 1987 to 1993, when he was dismissed by President Bill Clinton. After leaving the public sector, Sessions represented Semion Mogilevich, international leader of the Russian mafia. He is the father of Texas Congressman Pete Sessions.

== Early life and education ==
Sessions was born in Fort Smith, Arkansas, the son of Edith A. (née Steele) and the Reverend Will Anderson Sessions Jr. He graduated from Northeast High School in Kansas City, Missouri, in 1948, and enlisted in the United States Air Force, receiving his commission October 1952. He served on active duty until October 1955. He attended Baylor University in Waco, Texas, where he received a Bachelor of Arts degree in 1956. He received a Bachelor of Laws in 1958 from Baylor Law School. At Baylor, Sessions became a member of the Delta Chi fraternity. He was an Eagle Scout and recipient of the Distinguished Eagle Scout Award from the Boy Scouts of America.

== Career ==
=== Law practice ===
Sessions was an attorney for the firm of Haley, Fulbright, Winniford, Sessions, and Bice in Waco, Texas, from 1963 until 1969. He was then appointed Chief of the Government Operations Section, Criminal Division of the Department of Justice in Washington, D.C., where he served until his appointment as United States Attorney for the Western District of Texas in 1971.

=== Federal judicial service ===
Sessions was nominated by President Gerald Ford on December 11, 1974, to a seat on the United States District Court for the Western District of Texas vacated by Judge Ernest Allen Guinn. He was confirmed by the United States Senate on December 19, 1974, and received his commission on December 20, 1974. He served as Chief Judge from 1980 to 1987. He served as a board member of the Federal Judicial Center from 1980 to 1984. His service terminated on November 1, 1987, due to his resignation.

=== FBI Director (1987–1993) ===
After a two-month search, Sessions was nominated to succeed William H. Webster as FBI Director by President Ronald Reagan and was sworn in on November 2, 1987.

Sessions was viewed as combining tough direction with fairness and was respected even by the Reagan administration's critics, although he was sometimes ridiculed as straitlaced and dull and lacking hands-on leadership. He worked to raise the image of the FBI in Congress and fought to raise the pay of FBI agents, which had lagged behind other law enforcement agencies.

Reflecting the tensions between the Justice Department and the independent Bureau, Sessions announced that the FBI would be looking into whether Justice Department officials illegally misled a federal judge in a politically sensitive bank fraud case involving loans to Iraq before the Persian Gulf War, and 48 hours later Sessions was the subject of an ethics investigation on whether he had abused his office perks.

Sessions enjoyed his strongest support among liberal Democrats in Congress. Sessions was applauded for pursuing a policy of broadening the FBI to include more women and minorities, efforts which upset the "old boys" at the Bureau.

Sample "Winners Don't Use Drugs" message from Golden Axe.

Sessions became associated with the phrase "Winners Don't Use Drugs", which appeared in the attract mode of North American–released arcade games from 1989 to 2000. By law, it had to be included on all imported arcade games released in North America, and continued to appear long after Sessions left office. The quote normally appeared in gold against a blue background between the FBI seal and Sessions' name.

Sessions' major contributions to the US criminal justice community include the encouraging of the FBI laboratory to develop a DNA program with a strong legal underpinning and the automation of the national fingerprint process. The latter project, known as the Integrated Automated Fingerprint Identification System (IAFIS), reduced the turnaround time from months to hours for fingerprint searches for both criminal arrest cycles and applicants for sensitive positions such as teachers.

During his tenure as FBI director, Sessions made periodic appearances on the television program Unsolved Mysteries, presenting cases of wanted fugitives.

Sessions's final years as FBI director were marked by two highly controversial incidents: the 1992 Ruby Ridge standoff, during which an unarmed woman, Vicki Weaver, was killed by an FBI sniper, Lon Horiuchi, while she was holding a 10-month-old baby; and the 1993 Waco siege, which resulted in the deaths of 82 Branch Davidians, including 28 children. The Ruby Ridge standoff and the Waco siege were later cited as motivations for the Oklahoma City bombing, the deadliest act of terrorism in U.S. history before the September 11 attacks.

==== Allegations of ethics violations and dismissal ====
Just before Bill Clinton was inaugurated as the 42nd President of the United States on January 20, 1993, allegations of ethical improprieties were made against Sessions. A report by outgoing Attorney General William P. Barr presented to the Justice Department that month by the Office of Professional Responsibility included criticisms that he had used an FBI plane to travel to visit his daughter on several occasions, and had a security system installed in his home at government expense. Janet Reno, the 78th Attorney General of the United States, announced that Sessions had exhibited "serious deficiencies in judgment".

Although Sessions denied that he had acted improperly, he was pressured to resign in early July, with some suggesting that Clinton was giving Sessions the chance to step down in a dignified manner. Sessions refused, saying that he had done nothing wrong, and insisted on staying in office until his successor was confirmed. As a result, Clinton dismissed Sessions on July 19, 1993. Sessions was five and a half years into a ten-year term as FBI director; however, the holder of this post serves at the pleasure of the President.

Clinton nominated Louis Freeh to the FBI directorship on July 20, 1993. Then–FBI Deputy Director Floyd I. Clarke, who Sessions suggested had led a coup to force his removal, served as Acting Director until September 1, 1993, when Freeh was sworn in.

Sessions returned to Texas where on December 7, 1999, he was named the state chair of Texas Exile, a statewide initiative aimed at reducing gun crime.

=== Later career ===
William Sessions was the American attorney of Semion Mogilevich, the "boss of bosses" of the Russian mafia, and a member of the FBI Most Wanted Fugitives list, with close ties to Vladimir Putin.

Sessions was a member of the American Bar Association and had served as an officer or on the Board of Directors of the Federal Bar Association of San Antonio, the American Judicature Society, the San Antonio Bar Association, the Waco-McLennan County Bar Association, and the District Judges' Association of the Fifth Circuit. He was appointed by Reagan as a Commissioner of the Martin Luther King Jr., Federal Holiday Commission, and was a Delegate for the Americas to the Executive Committee of ICPO-Interpol. He was also a member of the Constitution Project's bipartisan Liberty and Security Committee.

Sessions was present on the American Bar Association task force examining the constitutionality of controversial presidential signing statements. It concluded in July 2006 that the practice "does grave harm to the separation of powers doctrine, and the system of checks and balances that have sustained our democracy for more than two centuries". In 2008, he argued that the execution of Troy Anthony Davis should not proceed because of serious doubts as Davis' guilt. Sessions agreed to serve on The Constitution Project's Guantanamo Task Force in December 2010.

He died less than two months after two former Acting FBI Directors, James B. Adams, and John E. Otto, and 6.5 months after another Acting FBI Director, William Ruckelshaus.

== Personal life ==
Sessions married Alice Lewis, his high school classmate, in 1952. Together, they had four children: William L., Pete, Mark, and Sara. He filed for divorce on February 20, 2018, but this was dismissed without prejudice on October 11, 2019. Alice died on December 21, 2019 at their home in Washington, D.C.

== Death ==
Sessions died on June 12, 2020, at his home in San Antonio from complications of heart failure. He was 90.

== General and cited references ==
- "Federal Bureau of Investigation: Directors, Then and Now".
- Unger, Craig (August 14, 2018). House of Trump, House of Putin: The Untold Story of Donald Trump and the Russian Mafia. Dutton. ISBN 978-1524743505.

Legal offices
Preceded by Ernest Allen Guinn	Judge of the United States District Court for the Western District of Texas; 1974–1987	Succeeded by Emilio M. Garza
Preceded by Jack Roberts	Chief Judge of the United States District Court for the Western District of Texas; 1980–1987	Succeeded by Lucius Desha Bunton III
Government offices
Preceded by John E. Otto; Acting	Director of the Federal Bureau of Investigation; 1987–1993	Succeeded by Floyd I. Clarke; Acting
