= Alan Albright =

American judge (born 1959)

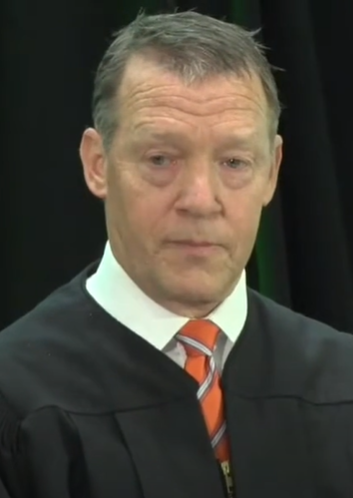

Judge of the United States District Court for the Western District of Texas
- In office September 10, 2018 – August 31, 2026
- Appointed by: Donald Trump
- Preceded by: Walter Scott Smith Jr.
- Succeeded by: vacant

Magistrate Judge of the United States District Court for the Western District of Texas
- In office 1992–1999

Personal details
- Born: November 24, 1959 (age 66) Hershey, Pennsylvania, U.S.
- Education: Trinity University (BA); University of Texas at Austin (JD)

Alan D Albright (Note: "D" is Albright's middle name, it is not an initial) (born November 24, 1959) is an American lawyer who was a United States district judge of the United States District Court for the Western District of Texas from 2018 to 2026. He was previously a United States magistrate judge of the same court. Albright at one point oversaw a significant portion of patent litigation within the United States. In 2021, the United States Court of Appeals for the Federal Circuit repeatedly rebuked him in a string of opinions for failing to transfer cases to more apt jurisdictions. A quarter of all patent lawsuits in the U.S. were once heard by Albright, who has been widely criticized for ignoring binding case law. However, following a docket-stripping order issued by Chief Judge Orlando Garcia, Albright's patent docket declined precipitously.

== Biography ==
Albright earned his Bachelor of Arts with honors from Trinity University and his Juris Doctor from the University of Texas School of Law. He taught trial advocacy at the University of Texas School of Law for several years as an adjunct professor. Before becoming a district judge, Albright was a partner in the Austin office of Bracewell LLP, where his practice focused on intellectual property law. He was in private practice at other firms in Austin from 1999 to 2015.

== Federal judicial service ==
Albright served as a United States magistrate judge of the United States District Court for the Western District of Texas from 1992 to 1999. On January 23, 2018, President Donald Trump announced his intent to nominate Albright to an undetermined seat on the United States District Court for the Western District of Texas. On January 24, 2018, his nomination was sent to the United States Senate. He was nominated to the seat vacated by Judge Walter Scott Smith Jr., who retired on September 14, 2016. On April 25, 2018, a hearing on his nomination was held before the Senate Judiciary Committee. On May 24, 2018, his nomination was reported out of committee by voice vote. On September 6, 2018, his nomination was confirmed by voice vote. He received his judicial commission on September 10, 2018, and was sworn in by Chief Judge Orlando Luis Garcia on September 18, 2018. He resigned from the court on August 31, 2026.

=== Patent law ===
After Albright encouraged patent owners to file claims in the Western District of Texas, one fifth of the nation's patent cases were filed in the district. On September 24, 2021, the United States Court of Appeals for the Federal Circuit rebuked Albright for refusing to follow the law limiting federal judges from retaining cases that should be transferred to another jurisdiction. On October 21, 2021, the Federal Circuit issued a writ of mandamus transferring another patent case that Albright oversaw because of his prior denial of transfer. The Federal Circuit's opinion rebuked Albright's continuous denial of transfers from the Western District.

Due to Albright's actions, on November 2, 2021, Senators Thom Tillis and Patrick Leahy wrote a bipartisan letter asking Chief Justice John Roberts to direct the Judicial Conference of the United States to "conduct a study of actual and potential abuses" that result from an "absence of adequate rules regulating judicial assignment and venue for patent cases within a [single judicial] district.". The letter criticized Albright for having "openly solicited cases at lawyers' meetings" and for having "repeatedly ignored binding case law and abused his discretion," noting that Albright's decisions "resulted in a flood of mandamus petitions" being filed and granted "no fewer than 15 times in just the past two years.".

=== Judicial reassignment order for patent cases ===
Because Albright was the only district judge in the Waco Division of the Western District of Texas, any patent cases filed in Waco were guaranteed to be assigned to him. This effectively gave plaintiffs the power to choose the judge to whom their cases were assigned by filing in the Waco Division, resulting in a disproportionately large number of patent cases being heard by Albright. Faced with mounting criticism from scholars, U.S. Senators, and the Chief Justice of the United States, on July 25, 2022, Chief Judge Orlando Garcia stripped Albright of automatic assignment of new patent cases filed in the Waco Division. The reassignment order stated that to "equitably distribute" patent cases, any new patent cases filed in the Waco Division on or after July 25, 2022, would be randomly assigned among twelve of the judges of the Western District of Texas, reducing Albright's case load to approximately 8% of new patent cases filed in Waco. The order only impacted judicial assignment of cases filed in the Waco Division, and only affects patent cases. Chief Judge Garcia's order was widely viewed by practitioners as signaling the demise of the Western District of Texas as a major venue for patent litigation.

== Return to private practice ==
On April 21, 2026, Albright told Bloomberg Law that he would be stepping down from his judgeship in August 2026 in order to return to private practice.

== Notes ==
Legal offices
Preceded by Walter Scott Smith Jr.	Judge of the United States District Court for the Western District of Texas; 2018–2026	Vacant
