= James Robertson Nowlin =

American judge (born 1937)

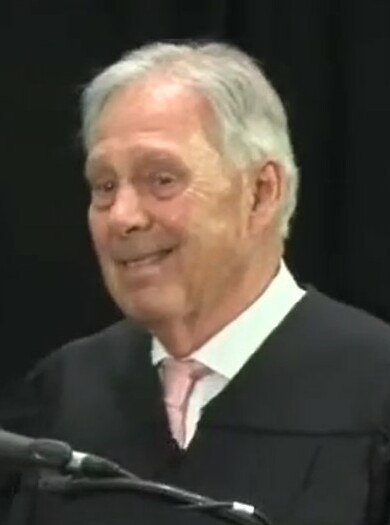
- Nowlin in 2019

Senior Judge of the United States District Court for the Western District of Texas
- Incumbent
- Assumed office May 31, 2003

Chief Judge of the United States District Court for the Western District of Texas
- In office 1999–2003
- Preceded by: Harry Lee Hudspeth
- Succeeded by: Walter Scott Smith Jr.

Judge of the United States District Court for the Western District of Texas
- In office October 26, 1981 – May 31, 2003
- Appointed by: Ronald Reagan
- Preceded by: Jack Roberts
- Succeeded by: Earl Leroy Yeakel III

Texas State Representative for District 57-F (Bexar County)
- In office January 1973 – November 6, 1981
- Succeeded by: Lamar S. Smith

Texas State Representative for District 57-4 (Bexar County)
- In office January 1967 – January 1971
- Succeeded by: Lou Kost Jr.

Personal details
- Born: November 21, 1937 (age 88) San Antonio, Texas, U.S.
- Party: Democratic (until 1971); Republican (from 1971)
- Education: Trinity University (BA, MA); University of Texas at Austin (JD)

James Robertson Nowlin (born November 21, 1937) is a senior United States district judge of the United States District Court for the Western District of Texas and a former state legislator.

== Education and career ==
Nowlin was born in San Antonio in Bexar County, Texas. He received a Bachelor of Arts degree from Trinity University in 1959, a Master of Arts from Trinity University in 1962, and a Juris Doctor from the University of Texas School of Law in 1963. He was in the United States Army as a captain from 1959 to 1960. He was in the Judge Advocate General's Corps of the United States Army Reserve from 1960 to 1968 and in private practice in San Antonio from 1963 to 1965. He was from 1965 to 1966 a legal counsel for the United States Senate Committee on Labor and Public Welfare in Washington, D.C.

=== Legislative service ===
Nowlin was a Democratic member of the Texas House of Representatives from 1967 to 1971 and a Republican from 1973 to 1981. In 1973, he and Joe Sage became the first two Republicans to represent Bexar County in the Texas legislature. Rather than seeking a third consecutive term in the House, Nowlin ran unsuccessfully as a Republican in 1970 for the Texas State Senate. Nowlin returned to the private practice of law in San Antonio in 1966 and remained so engaged until 1981.

=== Federal judicial service ===
On September 17, 1981, President Ronald Reagan nominated Nowlin to a seat vacated by Judge Jack Roberts. He was confirmed by the United States Senate on October 21, 1981, and received his commission on October 26, 1981. He served as Chief Judge from 1999 to 2003. On May 31, 2003, he assumed senior status.

== Personal ==
Upon his death, Nowlin will be interred at the Texas State Cemetery in Austin.

== Sources ==
Legal offices
Preceded by Jack Roberts	Judge of the United States District Court for the Western District of Texas; 1981–2003	Succeeded by Earl Leroy Yeakel III
Preceded by Harry Lee Hudspeth	Chief Judge of the United States District Court for the Western District of Texas; 1999–2003	Succeeded by Walter Scott Smith Jr.
