= Walter Scott Smith Jr. =

American judge (1940–2025)

Chief Judge of the United States District Court for the Western District of Texas
- In office 2003–2010
- Preceded by: James Robertson Nowlin
- Succeeded by: Samuel Frederick Biery Jr.

Judge of the United States District Court for the Western District of Texas
- In office October 4, 1984 – September 14, 2016
- Appointed by: Ronald Reagan
- Preceded by: Seat established by 98 Stat. 333
- Succeeded by: Alan Albright

Magistrate Judge of the United States District Court for the Western District of Texas
- In office 1983–1984

Personal details
- Born: October 26, 1940 Marlin, Texas, U.S.
- Died: September 5, 2025 (aged 84)
- Education: Baylor University (BA, JD)

Walter Scott Smith Jr. (October 26, 1940 – September 5, 2025) was a United States district judge of the United States District Court for the Western District of Texas.

== Early life and career ==
Born in Marlin, Texas, Smith received a Bachelor of Arts degree from Baylor University in 1964. He received a Juris Doctor from Baylor Law School in 1966. He was in private practice in Waco from 1966 to 1980. He was a judge of the 54th State District Court in McLennan County, Texas from 1980 to 1983.

== Federal judicial service ==
Smith was a United States Magistrate for the Western District of Texas, from 1983 to 1984. He was nominated by President Ronald Reagan on September 11, 1984, to the United States District Court for the Western District of Texas, to a new seat created by 98 Stat. 333. He was confirmed by the United States Senate on October 3, 1984, and received his commission on October 4, 1984. He served as Chief Judge from 2003 to 2010. He retired on September 14, 2016.

== Suspension from office ==
On December 3, 2015, the Judicial Council of the United States Court of Appeals for the Fifth Circuit suspended Smith from office for a year, allowing him to clear cases already on his docket. Cases filed in the Waco Division of the Western District would be handled by visiting judges during Smith's suspension. The suspension resulted due to allegations of unwanted sexual advances by Smith towards a female courthouse employee in his chambers in 1998. The suspension ended with his retirement.

== Death ==
Smith died on September 5, 2025, at the age of 84.

== See also ==
- List of United States federal judges by longevity of service

Legal offices
Preceded by Seat established by 98 Stat. 333	Judge of the United States District Court for the Western District of Texas; 1984–2016	Succeeded by Alan Albright
Preceded by James Robertson Nowlin	Chief Judge of the United States District Court for the Western District of Texas; 2003–2010	Succeeded by Samuel Frederick Biery Jr.
