= Ernest Allen Guinn =

American judge

Judge of the United States District Court for the Western District of Texas
- In office July 27, 1966 – June 9, 1974
- Appointed by: Lyndon B. Johnson
- Preceded by: Seat established by 80 Stat. 75
- Succeeded by: William S. Sessions

Personal details
- Born: Ernest Allen Guinn; September 29, 1905 Palestine, Texas, U.S.
- Died: June 9, 1974 (aged 68) El Paso, Texas, U.S.
- Education: University of Texas at Austin (B.A.); University of Texas School of Law (LL.B.)

Ernest Allen Guinn (September 29, 1905 – June 9, 1974) was a United States district judge of the United States District Court for the Western District of Texas.

== Education and career ==
Born in Palestine, Texas, Guinn received a Bachelor of Arts degree from the University of Texas at Austin in 1925 and a Bachelor of Laws from the University of Texas School of Law in 1927. He was in private practice in El Paso, Texas, from 1928 to 1930. He was an assistant city attorney of El Paso from 1935 to 1938, becoming the city attorney in 1938, and the county attorney of El Paso County, Texas, from 1939 to 1954.

Guinn then returned to private practice until 1966.

== Federal judicial service ==
On June 28, 1966, Guinn was nominated by President Lyndon B. Johnson to a new seat on the United States District Court for the Western District of Texas created by 80 Stat. 75.

He was confirmed by the United States Senate on July 22, 1966, and received his commission on July 27, 1966, serving in that capacity until his death on June 9, 1974, in El Paso.

== Sources ==
Legal offices
Preceded by Seat established by 80 Stat. 75	Judge of the United States District Court for the Western District of Texas; 1966–1974	Succeeded by William S. Sessions
