= Lucius Desha Bunton III =

American judge

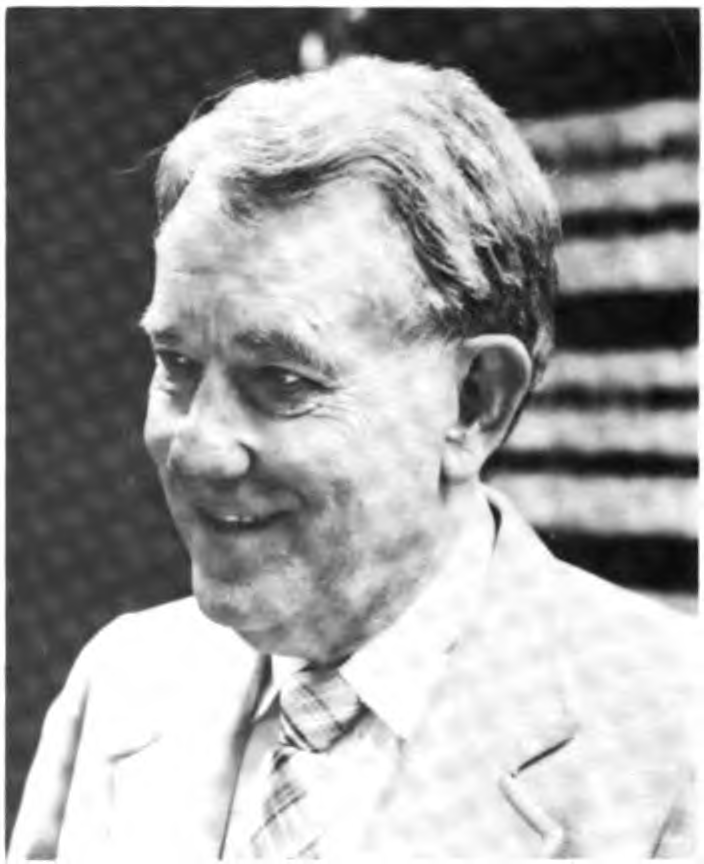

Senior Judge of the United States District Court for the Western District of Texas
- In office December 1, 1992 – January 17, 2001

Chief Judge of the United States District Court for the Western District of Texas
- In office 1987–1992
- Preceded by: William S. Sessions
- Succeeded by: Harry Lee Hudspeth

Judge of the United States District Court for the Western District of Texas
- In office November 27, 1979 – December 1, 1992
- Appointed by: Jimmy Carter
- Preceded by: John H. Wood Jr.
- Succeeded by: David Briones

Personal details
- Born: Lucius Desha Bunton III; December 1, 1924 Del Rio, Texas, U.S.
- Died: January 17, 2001 (aged 76) Austin, Texas, U.S.
- Education: University of Texas at Austin (BA); University of Texas School of Law (JD)

Lucius Desha Bunton III (December 1, 1924 – January 17, 2001) was a United States district judge of the United States District Court for the Western District of Texas.

== Education and career ==
Born in Del Rio, Texas, Bunton was a private in the United States Army, 76th Infantry Division, during World War II, from 1943 to 1946. He received a Bachelor of Arts degree from the University of Texas at Austin in 1947 and a Juris Doctor from the University of Texas School of Law in 1950. He was in private practice in Uvalde, Texas from 1950 to 1951, and in Marfa, Texas from 1951 to 1954. He was the district attorney of the 83rd Judicial District of Texas from 1954 to 1960, returning to private practice in Odessa, Texas from 1960 to 1979.

== Federal judicial service ==
On October 11, 1979, Bunton was nominated by President Jimmy Carter to a seat on the United States District Court for the Western District of Texas, following the assassination of Judge John H. Wood Jr. Bunton was confirmed by the United States Senate on November 26, 1979, and received his commission on November 27, 1979. He served as Chief Judge from 1987 to 1992, assuming senior status on December 1, 1992.

Bunton is known for his landmark ruling against the Federal Bureau of Investigation in Perez v FBI. The case centered around the FBI's discriminatory practices toward Agent 'Mat' Perez (the first Hispanic special agent in charge for the FBI) and 310 other FBI agents. Perez's suit claimed that he was discriminated against because of his Roman Catholic beliefs and his race. This landmark ruling by Bunton confirmed the FBI had violated Title VII of the Civil Rights Act, but rejected the probative value of the religious discrimination examples. Bunton's ruling directly affected the FBI under then-Director William Sessions' leadership and opened the door for additional lawsuits against federal agencies. The FBI was litigated against or talked with other groups of agents to avoid litigation.

Bunton is credited with spurring the Texas Legislature's creation of the Edwards Aquifer Authority to oversee the management of the aquifer. His judgement in the case is credited with protecting endangered species as well as the livelihoods of the Texans that rely on the water in their day-to-day lives.

Bunton took inactive senior status in May 2000 for health reasons due to a diagnosis of bladder cancer. He died of a heart attack on January 17, 2001, in Austin.

== Sources ==
- Lucius Desha Bunton III at IMDb

Legal offices
Preceded by John H. Wood Jr.	Judge of the United States District Court for the Western District of Texas; 1979–1992	Succeeded by David Briones
Preceded by William S. Sessions	Chief Judge of the United States District Court for the Western District of Texas; 1987–1992	Succeeded by Harry Lee Hudspeth
