= Chris Wolfe =

American judge (born 1972)

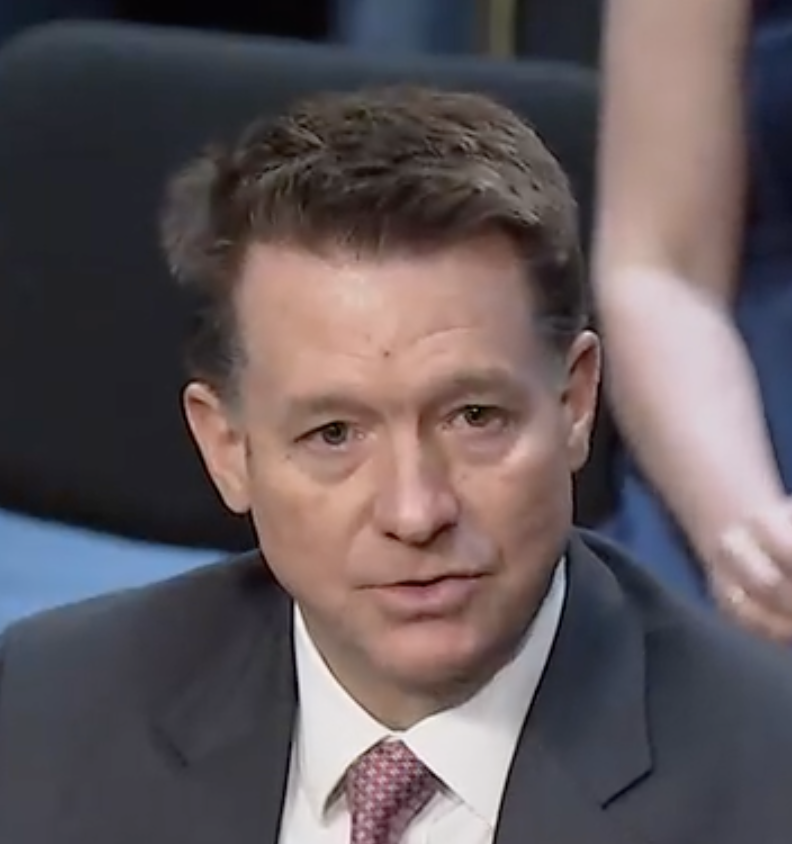

Judge of the United States District Court for the Western District of Texas
- Incumbent
- Assumed office April 23, 2026
- Appointed by: Donald Trump
- Preceded by: David C. Guaderrama

Personal details
- Born: Christopher Robert Wolfe; 1972 (age 53–54) Lubbock, Texas, U.S.
- Education: Baylor University (BA, JD)

Christopher Robert Wolfe (born 1972) is an American lawyer that serves as a United States district judge of the United States District Court for the Western District of Texas since 2026. He served as a judge of the Texas 213th District Court in Tarrant County, Texas, from 2018 to 2026.

== Education ==
Wolfe received his Bachelor of Arts degree in history in 1995 from Baylor University and his Juris Doctor in 1998 from Baylor Law School.

== Career ==
Wolfe served as a judge of the Texas 213th District Court in Tarrant County, Texas, from 2018 to 2026. He previously served as a prosecuting attorney for twenty years.

=== Federal judicial service ===
On January 6, 2026, President Donald Trump announced his intention to nominate Wolfe to an unspecified seat on the United States District Court for the Western District of Texas. On January 29, 2026, Trump formally nominated Wolfe to the seat on the Western District of Texas vacated by Judge David C. Guaderrama. On February 4, 2026, a hearing on his nomination was held before the Senate Judiciary Committee. On March 5, 2026, his nomination was reported from the Judiciary Committee by a 12–10 party-line vote. On April 14, 2026 the Senate invoked cloture on his nomination by a 53–45 vote. Later that day, the Senate confirmed his nomination by a 53–47 vote. He received his judicial commission on April 23, 2026.

Legal offices
Preceded by David C. Guaderrama	Judge of the United States District Court for the Western District of Texas; 2026–present	Incumbent
