= Adrian Anthony Spears =

American judge

Senior Judge of the United States District Court for the Western District of Texas
- In office October 10, 1979 – December 31, 1982

Chief Judge of the United States District Court for the Western District of Texas
- In office 1962–1979
- Preceded by: Ben Herbert Rice Jr.
- Succeeded by: Jack Roberts

Judge of the United States District Court for the Western District of Texas
- In office October 5, 1961 – October 10, 1979
- Appointed by: John F. Kennedy
- Preceded by: Seat established by 75 Stat. 80
- Succeeded by: Harry Lee Hudspeth

Personal details
- Born: Adrian Anthony Spears; July 8, 1910 Darlington, South Carolina
- Died: May 9, 1991 (aged 80) San Antonio, Texas
- Education: University of South Carolina School of Law (LL.B.)

Adrian Anthony Spears (July 8, 1910 – May 9, 1991) was a United States district judge of the United States District Court for the Western District of Texas.

== Education and career ==
Born in Darlington, South Carolina, Spears received a Bachelor of Laws from the University of South Carolina School of Law in 1934, and was in private practice in Darlington from 1934 to 1936, and then in San Antonio, Texas from 1937 to 1961. He was a special district judge of the State of Texas in 1951.

== Federal judicial service ==
On October 5, 1961, Spears received a recess appointment from President John F. Kennedy to a new seat on the United States District Court for the Western District of Texas created by 75 Stat. 80. He was formally nominated to the same seat by President Kennedy on January 15, 1962. He was confirmed by the United States Senate on March 16, 1962, and received his commission the following day. He served as Chief Judge from 1962 to 1979, assuming senior status on October 10, 1979. He was a Judge of the Temporary Emergency Court of Appeals from 1981 to 1982. He retired from the federal judiciary entirely on December 31, 1982.

== Post judicial service ==
Spears was thereafter a vice president of Tetco, Inc., in San Antonio, from 1983 until his death in that city on May 9, 1991.

== Sources ==
Legal offices
Preceded by Seat established by 75 Stat. 80	Judge of the United States District Court for the Western District of Texas; 1961–1979	Succeeded by Harry Lee Hudspeth
Preceded by Ben Herbert Rice Jr.	Chief Judge of the United States District Court for the Western District of Texas; 1962–1979	Succeeded by Jack Roberts
