= Thomas Shelton Maxey =

American judge

Judge of the United States District Court for the Western District of Texas
- In office June 25, 1888 – December 12, 1916
- Appointed by: Grover Cleveland
- Preceded by: Ezekiel B. Turner
- Succeeded by: DuVal West

Personal details
- Born: Thomas Shelton Maxey; September 1, 1846 Brandon, Mississippi
- Died: December 5, 1921 (aged 75) Austin, Texas
- Education: University of Virginia School of Law (LL.B.)

Thomas Shelton Maxey (September 1, 1846 – December 5, 1921) was a United States district judge of the United States District Court for the Western District of Texas.

== Education and career ==
Born in Brandon, Mississippi, Maxey was in the Confederate States Army from 1864 to 1865, then received a Bachelor of Laws from the University of Virginia School of Law in 1869. He was a member of the Mississippi House of Representatives in 1870. He was in private practice in Jefferson, Texas from 1871 to 1877, serving as city attorney for Jefferson from 1875 to 1877 before moving his private practice to Austin, Texas from 1877 to 1888.

== Federal judicial service ==
On June 18, 1888, Maxey was nominated by President Grover Cleveland to a seat on the United States District Court for the Western District of Texas vacated by Judge Ezekiel B. Turner. Maxey was confirmed by the United States Senate on June 25, 1888, and received his commission the same day. He retired on December 12, 1916. Maxey died on December 5, 1921, in Austin.

== Sources ==
Legal offices
Preceded by Ezekiel B. Turner	Judge of the United States District Court for the Western District of Texas; 1888–1916	Succeeded by DuVal West
