= Frank Montalvo =

Puerto Rican judge (born 1956)

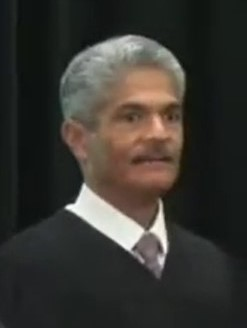
- Montalvo in 2019

Senior Judge of the United States District Court for the Western District of Texas
- Incumbent
- Assumed office December 1, 2022

Judge of the United States District Court for the Western District of Texas
- In office August 1, 2003 – December 1, 2022
- Appointed by: George W. Bush
- Preceded by: Seat established by 116 Stat. 1758
- Succeeded by: Leon Schydlower

Personal details
- Born: May 6, 1956 (age 69) Bayamón, Puerto Rico
- Education: University of Puerto Rico (BS); University of Michigan (MS); Wayne State University (JD)

Frankie "Frank" Montalvo (born May 6, 1956) is a senior United States district judge of the United States District Court for the Western District of Texas.

== Education and career ==
Montalvo was born in Bayamón, Puerto Rico. He received a Bachelor of Science degree from the University of Puerto Rico in 1976, a Master of Science degree from the University of Michigan in 1977, and a Juris Doctor from Wayne State University Law School in 1985. He was an engineer at General Motors from 1983 to 1988, in private practice in San Antonio, Texas from 1988 to 1994, and he was a judge on the 288th Judicial District Court of Texas from 1995 to 2003.

=== Federal judicial service ===
On May 1, 2003, Montalvo was nominated by President George W. Bush to a new seat on the United States District Court for the Western District of Texas created by 116 Stat. 1758. He was confirmed by the United States Senate on July 31, 2003, and received his commission on August 1, 2003. He assumed senior status on December 1, 2022.

== See also ==
- List of Hispanic and Latino American jurists

== Sources ==
Legal offices
Preceded by Seat established by 116 Stat. 1758	Judge of the United States District Court for the Western District of Texas; 2003–2022	Succeeded by Leon Schydlower
