= Ben Herbert Rice Jr. =

American judge

Chief Judge of the United States District Court for the Western District of Texas
- In office 1948–1962
- Preceded by: Office established
- Succeeded by: Adrian Anthony Spears

Judge of the United States District Court for the Western District of Texas
- In office September 28, 1945 – March 14, 1964
- Appointed by: Harry S. Truman
- Preceded by: Walter Angus Keeling
- Succeeded by: Dorwin Wallace Suttle

Personal details
- Born: December 12, 1889 Marlin, Texas
- Died: March 14, 1964 (aged 74) Marlin, Texas
- Education: University of Texas at Austin (B.A.); University of Texas School of Law (LL.B., LL.M.)

Ben Herbert Rice Jr. (December 12, 1889 – March 14, 1964) was a United States district judge of the United States District Court for the Western District of Texas.

== Education and career ==
Born in Marlin, Texas, Rice received a Bachelor of Laws from the University of Texas School of Law in 1913, a Bachelor of Arts degree from the University of Texas at Austin in 1914 and a Master of Laws from the University of Texas School of Law 1914. He was an assistant county attorney of Falls County, Texas from 1914 to 1917 before serving in the United States Army Air Corps during World War I from 1917 to 1919. He entered private practice in Marlin from 1919 to 1940, also working as a city attorney for Marlin from 1920 to 1929. He was Chief Justice of the Texas Court of Civil Appeals from 1940 to 1945.

== Federal judicial service ==
On September 10, 1945, Rice was nominated by President Harry S. Truman to a seat on the United States District Court for the Western District of Texas vacated by Judge Walter Angus Keeling. Rice was confirmed by the United States Senate on September 19, 1945, and received his commission on September 28, 1945. He served as Chief Judge from 1948 to 1962. His service terminated on March 14, 1964, due to his death in Marlin.

== Sources ==
Legal offices
Preceded by Walter Angus Keeling	Judge of the United States District Court for the Western District of Texas; 1945–1964	Succeeded by Dorwin Wallace Suttle
Preceded by Office established	Chief Judge of the United States District Court for the Western District of Texas; 1948–1962	Succeeded by Adrian Anthony Spears
