= Philip Ray Martinez =

American judge (1957–2021)

Judge of the United States District Court for the Western District of Texas
- In office February 12, 2002 – February 26, 2021
- Appointed by: George W. Bush
- Preceded by: Seat established by 114 Stat. 2762
- Succeeded by: Ernesto Gonzalez

Personal details
- Born: Philip Ray Martinez, Jr. July 13, 1957 El Paso, Texas, U.S.
- Died: February 26, 2021 (aged 63)
- Spouse: Mayela Del Carmen (1985–2021)
- Children: 2
- Education: University of Texas at El Paso (BA); Harvard University (JD)

Philip Ray Martinez (July 13, 1957 – February 26, 2021) was a United States district judge of the United States District Court for the Western District of Texas.

== Education and career ==
Born in El Paso, Texas, Martinez received a Bachelor of Arts degree from the University of Texas at El Paso in 1979 and a Juris Doctor from Harvard Law School in 1982. He was in private practice in El Paso from 1982 to 1990. He was a judge on the County Court at Law #1, El Paso County from 1991 to 1994, and on the 327th Judicial District Court, Texas from 1991 to 2002.

== Federal judicial service ==
On October 9, 2001, Martinez was nominated by President George W. Bush to a new seat on the United States District Court for the Western District of Texas created by 114 Stat. 2762. He was confirmed by the United States Senate on February 5, 2002, and received his commission on February 12, 2002. His service terminated on February 26, 2021, due to his death of an apparent heart attack.

== See also ==
- List of Hispanic and Latino American jurists

== Sources ==
Legal offices
Preceded by Seat established by 114 Stat. 2762	Judge of the United States District Court for the Western District of Texas; 2002–2021	Succeeded by Ernesto Gonzalez
