= United States District Court for the Western District of Texas =

United States federal district court in Texas

- (W.D. Tex.)
- Location: San Antonio More locations: United States Courthouse (Austin); Alpine; Del Rio; El Paso; Fort Cavazos; Midland; Pecos; Waco
- Appeals to: Fifth Circuit
- Established: February 21, 1857
- Judges: 13
- Chief Judge: Alia Moses

Officers of the court
- U.S. Attorney: Justin R. Simmons (interim)
- U.S. Marshal: Susan Pamerleau
- www.txwd.uscourts.gov

The United States District Court for the Western District of Texas (in case citations, W.D. Tex.) is a federal district court. The court convenes in San Antonio with divisions in Austin, Del Rio, El Paso, Midland, Pecos, and Waco. It has jurisdiction in over 50 Trans-Pecos, Permian Basin, and Hill Country counties of the U.S. state of Texas. This district covers over 92,000 square miles (240,000 km^{2}) and seven divisions.

Along with the District of New Mexico, Southern District of Texas, and District of Arizona, it is one of the busiest district courts in terms of criminal felony filings.

== History ==
The first federal judge in Texas was John C. Watrous, who was appointed on May 26, 1846, and had previously served as Attorney General of the Republic of Texas. He was assigned to hold court in Galveston, at the time, the largest city in the state. As seat of the Texas Judicial District, the Galveston court had jurisdiction over the whole state. On February 21, 1857, the state was divided into two districts, Eastern and Western, with Judge Watrous continuing in the Eastern district. Judge Watrous and Judge Thomas H. DuVal, of the Western District of Texas, left the state on the secession of Texas from the Union, the only two federal judges not to resign their posts in states that seceded. When Texas was restored to the Union, Watrous and DuVal resumed their duties and served until 1870.

== Divisions ==
Appeals from cases brought in the Western District of Texas are taken to the United States Court of Appeals for the Fifth Circuit (except for patent claims and claims against the U.S. government under the Tucker Act, which are appealed to the Federal Circuit).

The divisions of the Western District of Texas are:

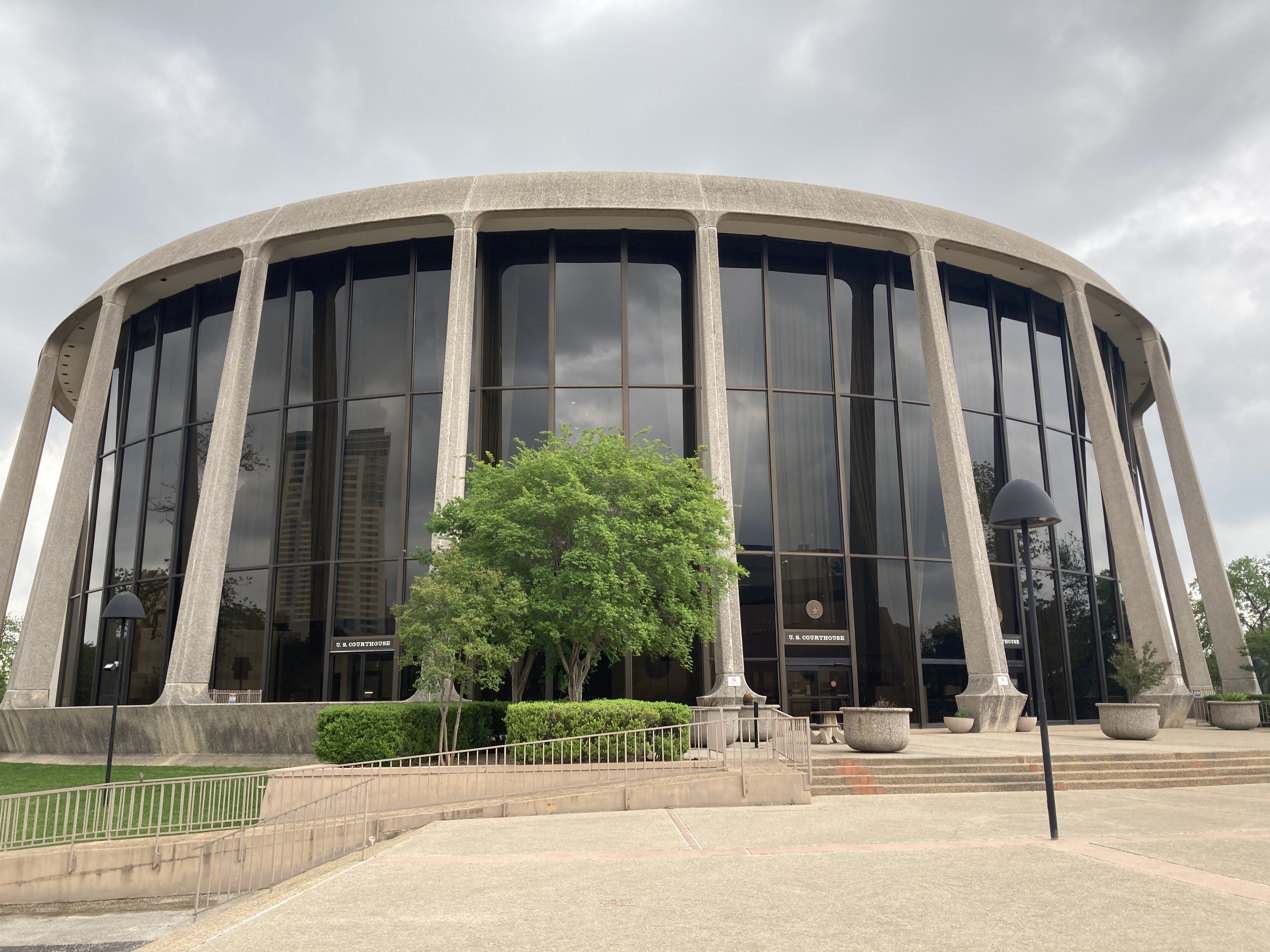
John H. Wood Jr. Federal Courthouse, home of the court's San Antonio Division

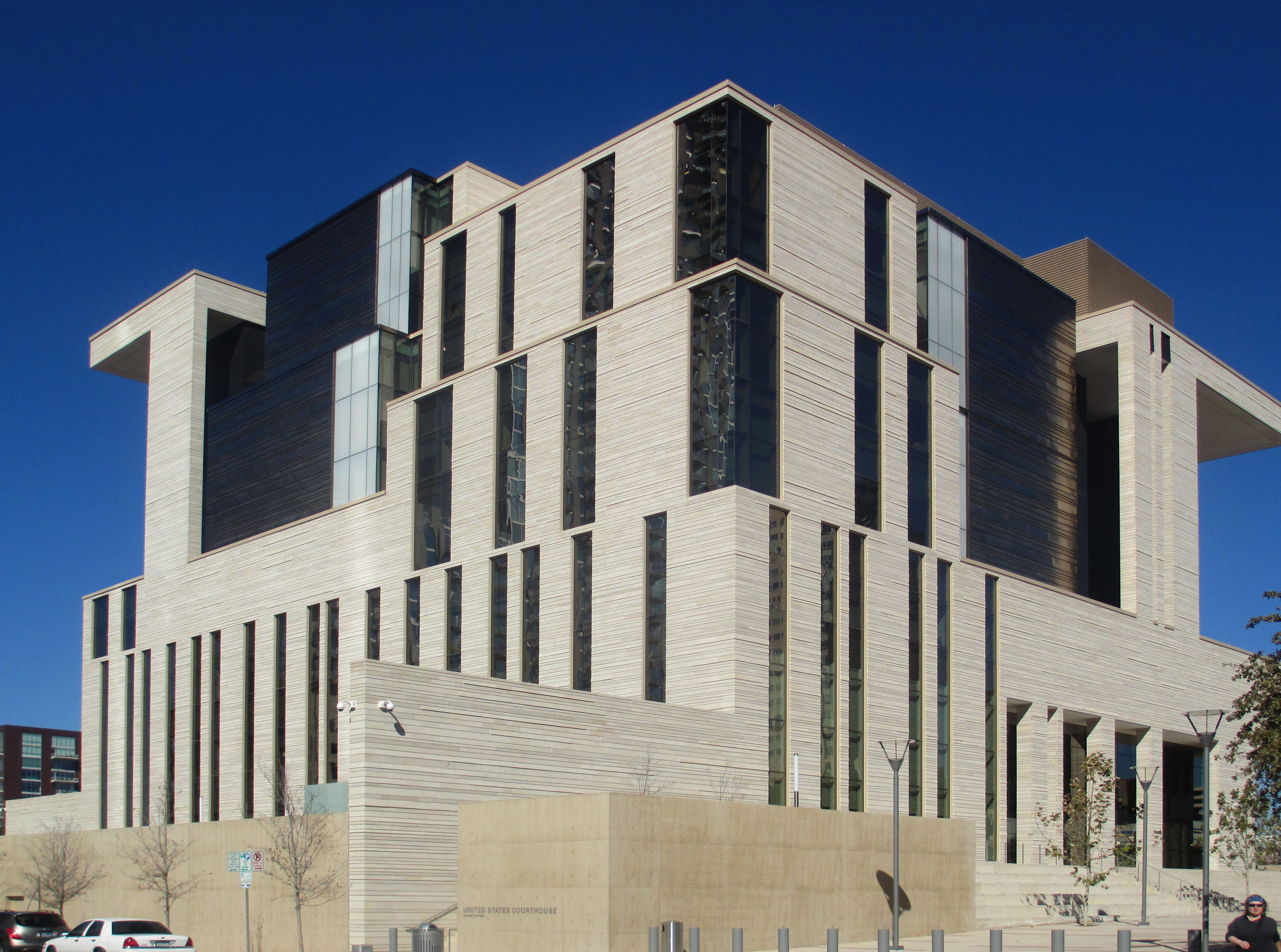
The federal courthouse in Austin is the court location of the United States District Court for the Western District of Texas, Austin Division.

- Austin Division comprises the following counties: Bastrop, Blanco, Burleson, Burnet, Caldwell, Gillespie, Hays, Kimble, Lampasas, Lee, Llano, Mason, McCulloch, San Saba, Travis, Washington and Williamson.
- Del Rio Division comprises the following counties: Edwards, Kinney, Maverick, Terrell, Uvalde, Val Verde and Zavala.
- El Paso Division comprises the following counties: El Paso and Hudspeth.
- Midland-Odessa Division comprises the following counties: Andrews, Crane, Ector, Martin, Midland and Upton.
- Pecos Division comprises the following counties: Brewster, Culberson, Jeff Davis, Loving, Pecos, Presidio, Reeves, Ward and Winkler.
- San Antonio Division comprises the following counties: Atascosa, Bandera, Bexar, Comal, Dimmit, Frio, Gonzales, Guadalupe, Karnes, Kendall, Kerr, Medina, Real and Wilson.
- Waco Division comprises the following counties: Bell, Bosque, Coryell, Falls, Freestone, Hamilton, Hill, Leon, Limestone, McLennan, Milam, Robertson and Somervell.

The United States Attorney's Office for the Western District of Texas represents the United States in civil and criminal litigation in the court. As of May 31, 2025 the United States Attorney is Justin R. Simmons.

== Notable cases ==
- Kocurek Assassination Attempt: Judge Lee Yeakel presided over the case of Chimene Onyeri, an aspiring Houston rapper who in 2015 attempted to assassinate Travis County District Judge Julie Kocurek after she previously sentenced him for probation violation, having shot her as she and her son were returning home from a football game at his high school before she was about to sentence him. The investigation of the attempt revealed a criminal theft and fraud enterprise he ran. After his many associates testified of his schemes, a federal jury convicted Onyeri on 17 counts of fraud, theft, racketeering and attempted murder and sentenced him to life in prison.

== Current judges ==
As of August 31, 2026:

#	Title	Judge	Duty station	Born	Term of service			Appointed by
#	Title	Judge	Duty station	Born	Active	Chief	Senior	Appointed by
32	Chief Judge	Alia Moses	Del Rio	1962	2002–present	2022–present	—	G.W. Bush
27	District Judge	Samuel Biery Jr.	San Antonio	1947	1994–present	2010–2015	—	Clinton
29	District Judge	Orlando Luis Garcia	San Antonio	1952	1994–present	2016–2022	—	Clinton
35	District Judge	Kathleen Cardone	El Paso	1953	2003–present	—	—	G.W. Bush
37	District Judge	Xavier Rodriguez	San Antonio	1961	2003–present	—	—	G.W. Bush
39	District Judge	Robert L. Pitman	Austin	1962	2014–present	—	—	Obama
40	District Judge	David Counts	Midland; Pecos	1961	2018–present	—	—	Trump
42	District Judge	Jason K. Pulliam	San Antonio	1971	2019–present	—	—	Trump
43	District Judge	Leon Schydlower	El Paso	1971	2024–present	—	—	Biden
44	District Judge	Ernesto Gonzalez	Del Rio	1962	2024–present	—	—	Biden
45	District Judge	Chris Wolfe	Waco	1972	2026–present	—	—	Trump
46	District Judge	Andrew B. Davis	Austin	1985	2026–present	—	—	Trump
47	District Judge	vacant	—	—	—	—	—	—
22	Senior Judge	James Nowlin	Austin	1937	1981–2003	1999–2003	2003–present	Reagan
30	Senior Judge	David Briones	El Paso	1943	1994–2009	—	2009–present	Clinton
36	Senior Judge	Frank Montalvo	inactive	1956	2003–2022	—	2022–present	G.W. Bush
38	Senior Judge	David C. Guaderrama	El Paso	1954	2012–2023	—	2023–present	Obama

== Vacancies and pending nominations ==
Seat	Prior judge's duty station	Seat last held by	Vacancy reason	Date of vacancy	Nominee	Date of nomination
7	Austin	Alan Albright	Resignation	August 31, 2026	James P. Sullivan	November 16, 2026

== Former judges ==
#	Judge	Born–died	Active service	Chief Judge	Senior status	Appointed by	Reason for termination
1	Thomas Howard DuVal	1813–1880	1857–1880	—	—	Pierce	death
2	Ezekiel B. Turner	1825–1888	1880–1888 (Note: Recess appointment; formally nominated on December 14, 1880, confirmed by the United States Senate on December 20, 1880, and received commission the same day.)	—	—	Hayes	death
3	Thomas Sheldon Maxey	1846–1921	1888–1916	—	—	Cleveland	retirement
4	DuVal West	1861–1949	1916–1931	—	1931–1949	Wilson	death
5	William Robert Smith	1863–1924	1917–1924	—	—	Wilson	death
6	Charles Albert Boynton	1867–1954	1924–1947	—	1947–1954	Coolidge	death
7	Robert Johnston McMillan	1885–1941	1932–1941	—	—	Hoover	death
8	Walter Angus Keeling	1873–1945	1942–1945	—	—	F. Roosevelt	death
9	Ben Herbert Rice Jr.	1889–1964	1945–1964	1948–1962	—	Truman	death
10	R. Ewing Thomason	1879–1973	1947–1963	—	1963–1973	Truman	death
11	Adrian Anthony Spears	1910–1991	1961–1979 (Note: Recess appointment; formally nominated on January 15, 1962, confirmed by the Senate on March 16, 1962, and received commission on March 17, 1962.)	1962–1979	1979–1982	Kennedy	retirement
12	Homer Thornberry	1909–1995	1963–1965	—	—	L. Johnson (Note: Judge Thornberry was nominated by President Kennedy but was appointed to the Court by (i.e., received his commission from) President Johnson.)	elevation
13	Dorwin Wallace Suttle	1906–2001	1964–1979	—	1979–2001	L. Johnson	death
14	Jack Roberts	1910–1988	1966–1980	1979–1980	1980–1988	L. Johnson	death
15	Ernest Allen Guinn	1905–1974	1966–1974	—	—	L. Johnson	death
16	John H. Wood Jr.	1916–1979	1970–1979	—	—	Nixon	assassination
17	William S. Sessions	1930–2020	1974–1987	1980–1987	—	Ford	resignation
18	Lucius Desha Bunton III	1924–2001	1979–1992	1987–1992	1992–2001	Carter	death
19	Harry Lee Hudspeth	1935–2024	1979–2001	1992–1999	2001–2016	Carter	retirement
20	Clyde Frederick Shannon Jr.	1942–present	1980–1984	—	—	Carter	resignation
21	Hipolito Frank Garcia	1925–2002	1980–2002	—	—	Carter	death
23	Edward C. Prado	1947–present	1984–2003	—	—	Reagan	elevation
24	Walter Scott Smith Jr.	1940–2025	1984–2016	2003–2010	—	Reagan	retirement
25	Emilio M. Garza	1947–present	1988–1991	—	—	Reagan	elevation
26	Sam Sparks	1939–2025	1991–2017	—	2017–2025	G.H.W. Bush	death
28	William Royal Furgeson Jr.	1941–present	1994–2008	—	2008–2013	Clinton	retirement
31	Philip Ray Martinez	1957–2021	2002–2021	—	—	G.W. Bush	death
33	Robert A. Junell	1947–2025	2003–2015	—	2015–2025	G.W. Bush	death
34	Earl Leroy Yeakel III	1945–present	2003–2023	—	—	G.W. Bush	retirement
41	Alan Albright	1959–present	2018–2026	—	—	Trump	resignation

== Chief judges ==
Chief judges have administrative responsibilities with respect to their district court. Unlike the Supreme Court, where one justice is specifically nominated to be chief, the office of chief judge rotates among the district court judges. To be chief, a judge must have been in active service on the court for at least one year, be under the age of 65, and have not previously served as chief judge.

A vacancy is filled by the judge highest in seniority among the group of qualified judges. The chief judge serves for a term of seven years, or until age 70, whichever occurs first. The age restrictions are waived if no members of the court would otherwise be qualified for the position.

When the office was created in 1948, the chief judge was the longest-serving judge who had not elected to retire, on what has since 1958 been known as senior status, or declined to serve as chief judge. After August 6, 1959, judges could not become or remain chief after turning 70 years old. The current rules have been in operation since October 1, 1982.

== Succession of seats ==
Seat 1
Seat established on February 21, 1857 by 11 Stat. 164
DuVal	1857–1880
Turner	1880–1888
Maxey	1888–1916
West	1916–1931
McMillan	1932–1941
Keeling	1942–1945
Rice, Jr.	1945–1964
Suttle	1964–1979
Shannon, Jr.	1980–1984
Prado	1984–2003
Rodriguez	2003–present

Seat 2
Seat established on February 26, 1917 by 39 Stat. 938
W.R. Smith, Sr.	1917–1924
Boynton	1924–1947
Thomason	1947–1963
Thornberry	1963–1965
Roberts	1966–1980
Nowlin	1981–2003
Yeakel III	2003–2023
Davis	2026–present

Seat 3
Seat established on May 19, 1961 by 75 Stat. 80
Spears	1962–1979
Hudspeth	1979–2001
Moses	2002–present

Seat 4
Seat established on March 18, 1966 by 80 Stat. 75
Guinn	1966–1974
Sessions	1974–1987
Garza	1988–1991
O. Garcia	1994–present

Seat 5
Seat established on June 2, 1970 by 84 Stat. 294
Wood, Jr.	1970–1979
Bunton III	1979–1992
Briones	1994–2009
Guaderrama	2012–2023
Wolfe	2026–present

Seat 6
Seat established on October 20, 1978 by 92 Stat. 1629
H. Garcia	1980–2002
Junell	2003–2015
Counts III	2018–present

Seat 7
Seat established on July 10, 1984 by 98 Stat. 333
W.S. Smith, Jr.	1984–2016
Albright	2018–2026
vacant	2026–present

Seat 8
Seat established on December 1, 1990 by 104 Stat. 5089
Sparks	1991–2017
Pulliam	2019–present

Seat 9
Seat established on December 1, 1990 by 104 Stat. 5089
Furgeson, Jr.	1994–2008
Pitman	2014–present

Seat 10
Seat established on December 1, 1990 by 104 Stat. 5089
Biery, Jr.	1994–present

Seat 11
Seat established on December 21, 2000 by 114 Stat. 2762
Martinez	2002–2021
Gonzalez	2024–present

Seat 12
Seat established on November 2, 2002 by 116 Stat. 1758
Cardone	2003–present

Seat 13
Seat established on November 2, 2002 by 116 Stat. 1758
Montalvo	2003–2022
Schydlower	2024–present

== See also ==
- Courts of Texas
- List of current United States district judges
- List of United States federal courthouses in Texas
