= Robert Johnston McMillan =

American judge

Judge of the United States District Court for the Western District of Texas
- In office January 19, 1932 – October 27, 1941
- Appointed by: Herbert Hoover
- Preceded by: DuVal West
- Succeeded by: Walter Angus Keeling

Personal details
- Born: Robert Johnston McMillan; August 21, 1885 Galveston, Texas
- Died: October 27, 1941 (aged 56) San Antonio, Texas
- Education: University of Texas School of Law (LL.B.)

Robert Johnston McMillan (August 21, 1885 – October 27, 1941) was a United States district judge of the United States District Court for the Western District of Texas.

== Education and career ==
Born in Galveston, Texas, McMillan received a Bachelor of Laws from the University of Texas School of Law in 1906 and entered private practice in San Antonio, Texas. He was an assistant general attorney of the St. Louis-Brownsville & Mexico Railroad in Kingsville, Texas from 1907 to 1912. He was city attorney of San Antonio from 1917 to 1920, thereafter returning to private practice in San Antonio until 1931.

== Federal judicial service ==
On December 15, 1931, McMillan was nominated by President Herbert Hoover to a seat on the United States District Court for the Western District of Texas vacated by Judge DuVal West. McMillan was confirmed by the United States Senate on January 12, 1932, and received his commission on January 19, 1932. McMillan served in that capacity until his death on October 27, 1941, in San Antonio.

== Sources ==
Legal offices
Preceded by DuVal West	Judge of the United States District Court for the Western District of Texas; 1932–1941	Succeeded by Walter Angus Keeling
