= Samuel Frederick Biery Jr. =

American federal judge (born 1947)

Fred Biery
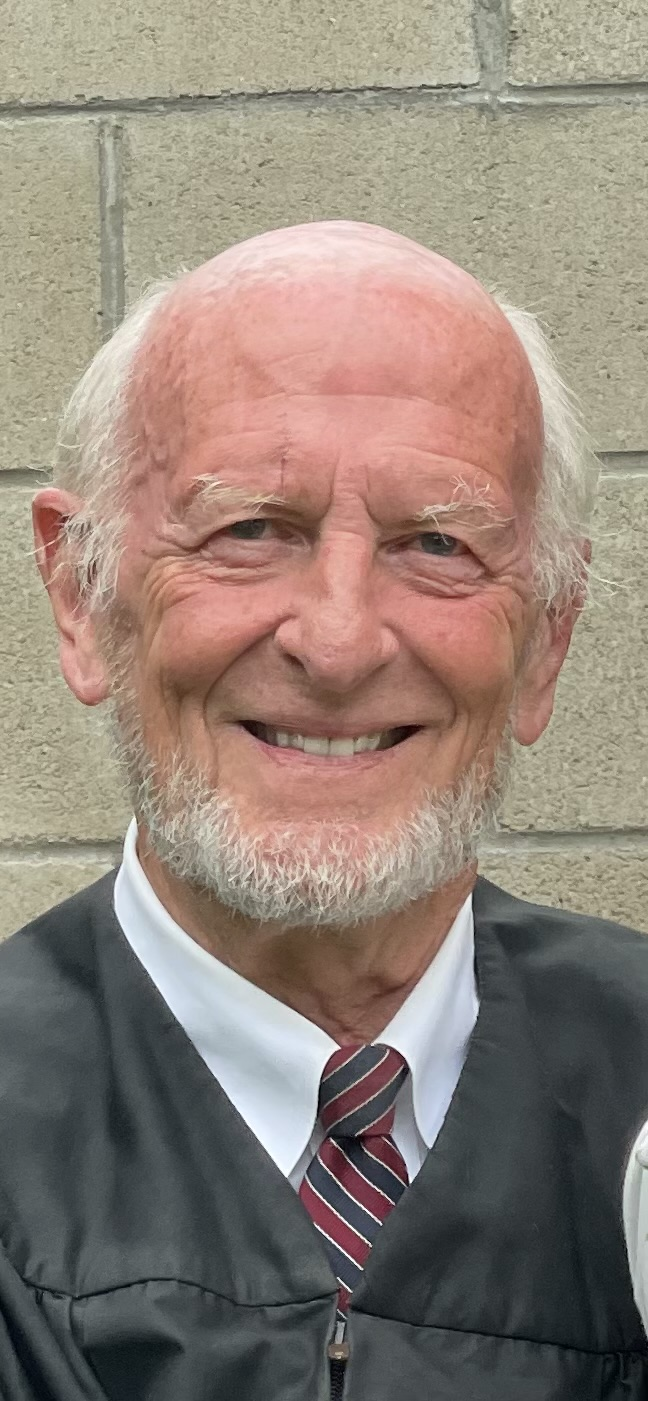

Chief Judge of the United States District Court for the Western District of Texas
- In office June 1, 2010 – December 31, 2015
- Preceded by: Walter Scott Smith Jr.
- Succeeded by: Orlando Luis Garcia

Judge of the United States District Court for the Western District of Texas
- Incumbent
- Assumed office March 11, 1994
- Appointed by: Bill Clinton
- Preceded by: Seat established by 104 Stat. 5089

Personal details
- Born: Samuel Frederick Biery Jr. 1947 (age 78–79) McAllen, Texas, U.S.
- Education: Texas Lutheran College (BA); Southern Methodist University (JD)

Samuel Frederick "Fred" Biery Jr. (born 1947) is an American lawyer and jurist serving as a United States district judge of the U.S. District Court for the Western District of Texas. He was appointed in 1994 by President Bill Clinton. He served as a Texas state court judge from 1979 to 1994.

== Early life and education ==
Biery was born in 1947, in McAllen, Texas, United States.

He received a Bachelor of Arts degree from Texas Lutheran College in 1970 and a Juris Doctor degree from Southern Methodist University in 1973. He served in the United States Army Reserve from 1970 to 1976, where he became an E-4.

== Legal career ==
Biery was in private practice in San Antonio, Texas, from 1973 to 1978. He served as a judge of the County Court 2 of Bexar County, Texas, from 1979 to 1982, of the Texas 150th District Court from 1983 to 1988, and of the Texas Fourth Court of Appeals from 1989 to 1994.

== Federal judicial service ==
On November 19, 1993, President Bill Clinton nominated Biery to a new seat on the United States District Court for the Western District of Texas created by 104 Stat. 5089. He was confirmed by the United States Senate on March 10, 1994, and received his commission on March 11. Biery served as chief judge from June 1, 2010, to late 2015. Biery is known for his witty, entertaining opinions. San Antonio Lawyer magazine has called him "a judge with a little extra to say". On April 29, 2013, his ruling in 35 Bar and Grille LLC, et al. v. The City of San Antonio gained notoriety for its puns, sexual innuendo, and double entendres. On August 20, 2025, Biery enjoined Texas from displaying the Ten Commandments in every classroom despite a state law passed in June.

In June 2022, Biery said he does not read opinions handed down from the Fifth Circuit, but he later said that was "courtroom banter".

=== Notable rulings ===
In January 2026, Biery blocked the immediate deportation of five-year-old Liam Conejo Ramos, whose seizure by immigration officers in Minnesota and rapid transport to a detention center in Texas sparked international outrage. Several days later, in a scathing opinion, he also ordered the release of the boy and his father from immigration detention.

Legal offices
Preceded by Seat established by 104 Stat. 5089	Judge of the United States District Court for the Western District of Texas; 1994–present	Incumbent
Preceded by Walter Scott Smith Jr.	Chief Judge of the United States District Court for the Western District of Texas; 2010–2015	Succeeded by Orlando Luis Garcia
