= Alia Moses =

American judge (born 1962)

Chief Judge of the United States District Court for the Western District of Texas
- Incumbent
- Assumed office November 18, 2022
- Preceded by: Orlando Luis Garcia

Judge of the United States District Court for the Western District of Texas
- Incumbent
- Assumed office November 15, 2002
- Appointed by: George W. Bush
- Preceded by: Harry Lee Hudspeth

Personal details
- Born: January 6, 1962 (age 64) Eagle Pass, Texas, U.S.
- Education: Texas Woman's University (BBA); University of Texas, Austin (JD)

Alia Moses (born January 6, 1962), formerly known as Alia Moses Ludlum, is the chief United States district judge of the United States District Court for the Western District of Texas.

== Early life and education ==
Born in Eagle Pass, Texas, Moses graduated in 1983 from Texas Woman's University with a Bachelor of Business Administration degree in Accounting, and in 1986 from the University of Texas School of Law with a Juris Doctor.

== Career ==
Following law school graduation, Moses was an attorney in the Travis County Attorney's Office in Austin, Texas from 1986 to 1990. She was an assistant United States attorney and chief of the Del Rio office in the Western District of Texas from 1990 to 1997. She worked as a part-time mediator in private practice from 1997 to 2000.

=== Federal judicial service ===
Moses began her federal judicial career as a United States magistrate judge when she was appointed to a four-year part-term in 1997. In 2000, she was promoted to a full-term magistrate judge.

On the recommendation of Texas Senators Phil Gramm and Kay Bailey Hutchison, Moses was nominated by President George W. Bush on July 11, 2002, to the United States District Court for the Western District of Texas. Her seat was previously held by Harry Lee Hudspeth, who then went into senior status. Moses was confirmed by the United States Senate on November 14, 2002, and received her commission the next day. Moses was appointed to the court under the name of Alia Moses Ludlum. Moses became chief judge on November 18, 2022, when her predecessor Orlando Luis Garcia turned 70 years old.

=== Notable case ===
On October 30, 2023, Moses ordered Border Patrol agents to stop removing concertina wire installed by the government of Texas with the purpose of deterring migrants.

=== Recognition ===
In 2026, a portrait of her was unveiled in the headquarters of the federal judiciary’s Western District of Texas, in San Antonio. All federal judges who become chief judges are thus recognized, with a portrait permanently hanging in the courthouse that is the headquarters for the district which they are assigned.

== See also ==
- List of Hispanic and Latino American jurists
- List of first women lawyers and judges in Texas

== Sources ==
Legal offices
Preceded by Harry Lee Hudspeth	Judge of the United States District Court for the Western District of Texas; 2002–present	Incumbent
Preceded by Orlando Luis Garcia	Chief Judge of the United States District Court for the Western District of Texas; 2022–present	Incumbent
