= Kathleen Cardone =

American judge (born 1953)

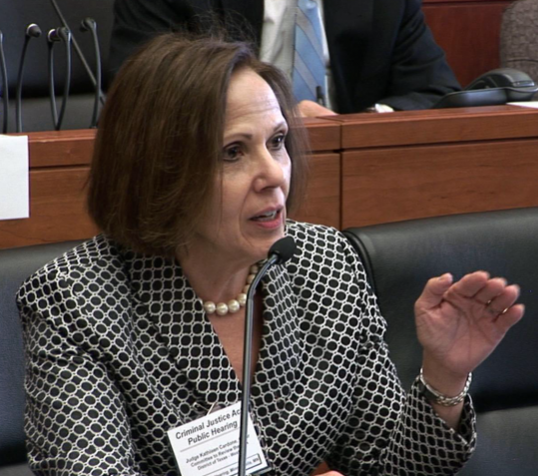

Judge of the United States District Court for the Western District of Texas
- Incumbent
- Assumed office July 29, 2003
- Appointed by: George W. Bush
- Preceded by: Seat established by 116 Stat. 1758

Personal details
- Born: December 25, 1953 (age 72) Medina, New York, U.S.
- Education: Binghamton University (BA); St. Mary's University (JD)

Kathleen Cardone (born December 25, 1953) is a United States District Judge of the United States District Court for the Western District of Texas. She has held an active seat on that court since 2003.

== Early life and education ==
Cardone was born in Medina, New York. She graduated from Binghamton University with her Bachelor of Arts degree in 1976 and later from the St. Mary's University School of Law where she earned her Juris Doctor in 1979.

== Career ==
Cardone started her legal career as a briefing attorney for Magistrate Judge Philip A. Schraub, a U.S. District Court for the Southern District of Texas. She held that role from 1979 to 1980. She was in private practice in Texas from 1980 to 1990. She was a judge on the Municipal Court for the City of El Paso from 1983 to 1990. She was an Associate judge for the Family Law Court of Texas from 1990 to 1995. She was a judge on the 383rd Judicial District Court of Texas from 1995 to 1996. Cardone worked as an Attorney/mediator for Texas Arbitration Mediation Services from 1997 to 1999. She was an Instructor (part-time) at El Paso Community College from 1997 to 2003. She was a judge on the 388th Judicial District Court of Texas from 1999 to 2000. She was a Mediator, Texas Arbitration Mediation Services from 2001 to 2003. She was a Visiting judge, State of Texas from 2001 to 2003.

== Federal judicial service ==
In 2003, Cardone was nominated to the United States District Court for the Western District of Texas by President George W. Bush on May 1, 2003, to a new seat created by 116 Stat. 1758. Cardone was confirmed by the Senate on July 28, 2003. She received her commission the next day.

In 2015, Cardone was appointed by Chief Justice John Roberts to chair a committee to review implementation of the 1964 Criminal Justice Act. The 2017 report released by the committee has since come to be known as the "Cardone Report."

=== Notable Rulings ===
In August 2021, Cardone issued a temporary injunction in the case U.S. vs Texas and Greg Abbott against an executive order by Texas Governor Greg Abbott to have Texas state troopers stop vehicles suspected of carrying illegal immigrants, who might be infected with COVID-19.

In October 2026, Cardone issued a preliminary injunction barring the federal government from building border barriers or conducting related ground-disturbing work in the Big Bend sector of Texas, including Big Bend National Park, while a lawsuit over the project proceeds. The order also barred reliance on waivers of environmental and other laws issued to speed construction.

== See also ==
- List of Hispanic and Latino American jurists

== Sources ==
Legal offices
Preceded by Seat established by 116 Stat. 1758	Judge of the United States District Court for the Western District of Texas; 2003–present	Incumbent
