= Julie Kocurek =

American judge (born 1964)

Julie H. Kocurek

Judge of the 390th Texas District Court for Travis County
- Incumbent
- Assumed office January 1999
- Appointed by: George W. Bush
- Preceded by: New judgeship

Personal details
- Born: October 2, 1964 (age 61) Dayton, Texas, U.S.
- Party: Democratic (2006–present)
- Other political affiliations: Republican (before 2006)
- Education: The University of Texas at Austin (BA); St. Mary's University (JD)

Julie H. Kocurek (born October 2, 1964) is an American attorney who serves as the presiding judge of the 390th District Court in Austin, Texas since January 1999, being appointed by then-Governor George W. Bush. Prior to serving as a Texas state judge, Kocurek served as an assistant district attorney in Travis County for seven years.

On November 6, 2015, Kocurek survived an assassination attempt outside of her Austin home. She returned to work in February 2016.

== Early life ==
Originally from Dayton, Texas, Kocurek graduated from Dayton High School, then received a Bachelor of Arts in economics from the University of Texas at Austin, and a Juris Doctor from St. Mary's University School of Law in 1990. Kocurek was an assistant district attorney in the Travis County District Attorney's Office for seven years, under District Attorney Ronnie Earle. She became board certified in criminal law in 1998, and in 1999 was appointed by Governor George W. Bush to a seat on the newly created 390th district court, becoming the first female district judge in Travis County.

== State judicial service ==
Kocurek's caseload has included presiding over cases brought against Texas governor Rick Perry and U.S Congressman Tom DeLay. In Perry's case, Kocurek presided briefly before recusing herself from the matter due to her previous association with the Travis County District Attorney's office, and transferring the matter to Judge Billy Ray Stubblefield, who assigned the matter to senior Judge Bert Richardson. Kocurek dispelled a claim made by former Alaska governor Sarah Palin that the case had been brought by Travis County District Attorney Rosemary Lehmberg, whom Perry had tried to force from office.

== Assassination attempt ==
On November 6, 2015, Kocurek was shot and seriously wounded by an assailant in the driveway of her home in the Tarrytown neighborhood as she and her son were returning home from a football game at her high school. Kocurek lost a finger due to the attack, but was able to return to the courtroom by February 2016.

The culprit behind the attack was Chimene Onyeri, an aspiring rapper whom Kocurek previously sentenced for running a tax refund scam. Since that conviction, he had expanded his criminal enterprise into credit card and debit card skimming, furthering his operation by bringing in multiple accomplices.

The investigation into the assassination attempt revealed the full scope of his racketeering enterprise, and Onyeri was put on trial at the federal courthouse in Austin. On April 26, 2018, a federal jury convicted Onyeri of all 17 counts charged against him, including charges related to the assassination attempt. Onyeri was found guilty of fraud, theft, and a racketeering charge linked to the attempted murder of Judge Kocurek and was sentenced to life in federal prison.

After the assassination attempt, it was revealed that someone had earlier called in an anonymous tip that an unnamed judge was going to be targeted, but the vague tip was dismissed after investigation. In April 2017, the Texas Senate passed the "Judge Julie Kocurek Judicial and Courthouse Security Act of 2017" (the Act), mandating security protection for judges who have been threatened or attacked, including the creation of a Court Security Division within the state's Office of Court Administration; after being amended and passed by the Texas Legislature in May 2017, the Act was signed into law by Governor of Texas Greg Abbott.
