= Homer Thornberry =

American judge (1909–1995)

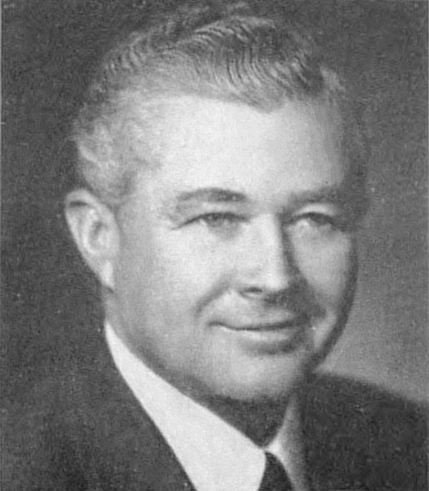

Senior Judge of the United States Court of Appeals for the Fifth Circuit
- In office December 21, 1978 – December 12, 1995

Judge of the United States Court of Appeals for the Fifth Circuit
- In office July 1, 1965 – December 21, 1978
- Appointed by: Lyndon B. Johnson
- Preceded by: Joseph Chappell Hutcheson Jr.
- Succeeded by: Reynaldo Guerra Garza

Judge of the United States District Court for the Western District of Texas
- In office December 17, 1963 – July 1, 1965
- Nominated by: John F. Kennedy
- Appointed by: Lyndon B. Johnson
- Preceded by: R. Ewing Thomason
- Succeeded by: Jack Roberts

Member of the U.S. House of Representatives from Texas's 10th district
- In office January 3, 1949 – December 20, 1963
- Preceded by: Lyndon B. Johnson
- Succeeded by: J. J. Pickle

Personal details
- Born: William Homer Thornberry; January 9, 1909 Austin, Texas, U.S.
- Died: December 12, 1995 (aged 86) Austin, Texas, U.S.
- Resting place: Texas State Cemetery
- Party: Democratic
- Spouse(s): Eloise Engle (1945–1989); Marian Harris Gilliam (1990–1995)
- Children: 3
- Education: University of Texas, Austin (BBA, LLB)

William Homer Thornberry (January 9, 1909 – December 12, 1995) was an American politician and judge. He served as the United States representative from the 10th congressional district of Texas from 1949 to 1963. From 1963 to 1965 he was a judge for the United States District Court for the Western District of Texas, and he was a judge for the United States Court of Appeals for the Fifth Circuit from 1965 to 1978.

== Early life ==
Thornberry was born in Austin, Texas. His parents were teachers in the State School for the Deaf and were themselves deaf. He attended public schools in Austin and graduated from Austin High School in 1927. He received a Bachelor of Business Administration in 1932 from the University of Texas at Austin and his Bachelor of Laws in 1936, from the University of Texas School of Law, where he was a member of the Acacia fraternity. He was in private practice of law in Austin from 1936 to 1941. He was a Member of the Texas House of Representatives from 1937 to 1941. He was district attorney of Travis County, Texas from 1941 to 1942. He was a United States Navy Lieutenant Commander from 1942 to 1946. He was in private practice of law in Austin from 1946 to 1948. He was a Member of the Austin City Council from 1946 to 1948.

== United States representative ==
Thornberry was elected in 1948 to the 81st United States Congress as a United States representative of the 10th congressional district of Texas. In winning the seat, he replaced its former occupant, Lyndon B. Johnson, who had been elected that year for the first time to the United States Senate. Thornberry was a member of the Rules Committee of the United States House of Representatives from January 1955 to his 1963 resignation, when he was appointed by Johnson, now President, to the federal bench.

He was one of the majority of the Texan delegation to decline to sign the 1956 Southern Manifesto opposing the desegregation of public schools ordered by the Supreme Court in Brown v. Board of Education. Thornberry voted against the Civil Rights Act of 1957 but in favor of the Civil Rights Act of 1960 and the 24th Amendment to the U.S. Constitution. During his time in Congress, Thornberry amassed a predominantly liberal voting record.

Thornberry was present on Air Force One and witnessed Lyndon Johnson taking the oath of office following the assassination of President Kennedy. He would move into the Elms, the Johnson's home, to help in the difficult transition to the new president.

== Federal judicial service ==
Thornberry was nominated by President John F. Kennedy on July 9, 1963, to a seat on the United States District Court for the Western District of Texas vacated by Judge R. Ewing Thomason. He was confirmed by the United States Senate on July 15, 1963, and received his commission from President Lyndon B. Johnson on December 17, 1963. His service was terminated on July 2, 1965, due to elevation to the Fifth Circuit.

Thornberry was nominated by President Johnson on June 22, 1965, to a seat on the United States Court of Appeals for the Fifth Circuit vacated by Judge Joseph Chappell Hutcheson Jr. He was confirmed by the Senate on July 1, 1965, and received his commission the same day. He assumed senior status on December 21, 1978. His service was terminated on December 12, 1995, due to his death.

== Supreme Court nomination ==
On June 26, 1968, Johnson nominated Thornberry as an associate justice of the United States Supreme Court, to fill the anticipated vacancy to be created by the nomination of associate justice Abe Fortas to become the next chief justice, upon the retirement of Earl Warren. The Senate Judiciary Committee held hearings on the nomination simultaneously with those on the Fortas nomination. On October 4, 1968, after several days of contentious debate on the floor of the Senate, and with prospects for confirmation fading, Johnson withdrew the Fortas nomination. As Fortas remained an associate justice, Thornberry's nomination became moot; no further action was taken and the nomination was withdrawn by the president.

== Death ==
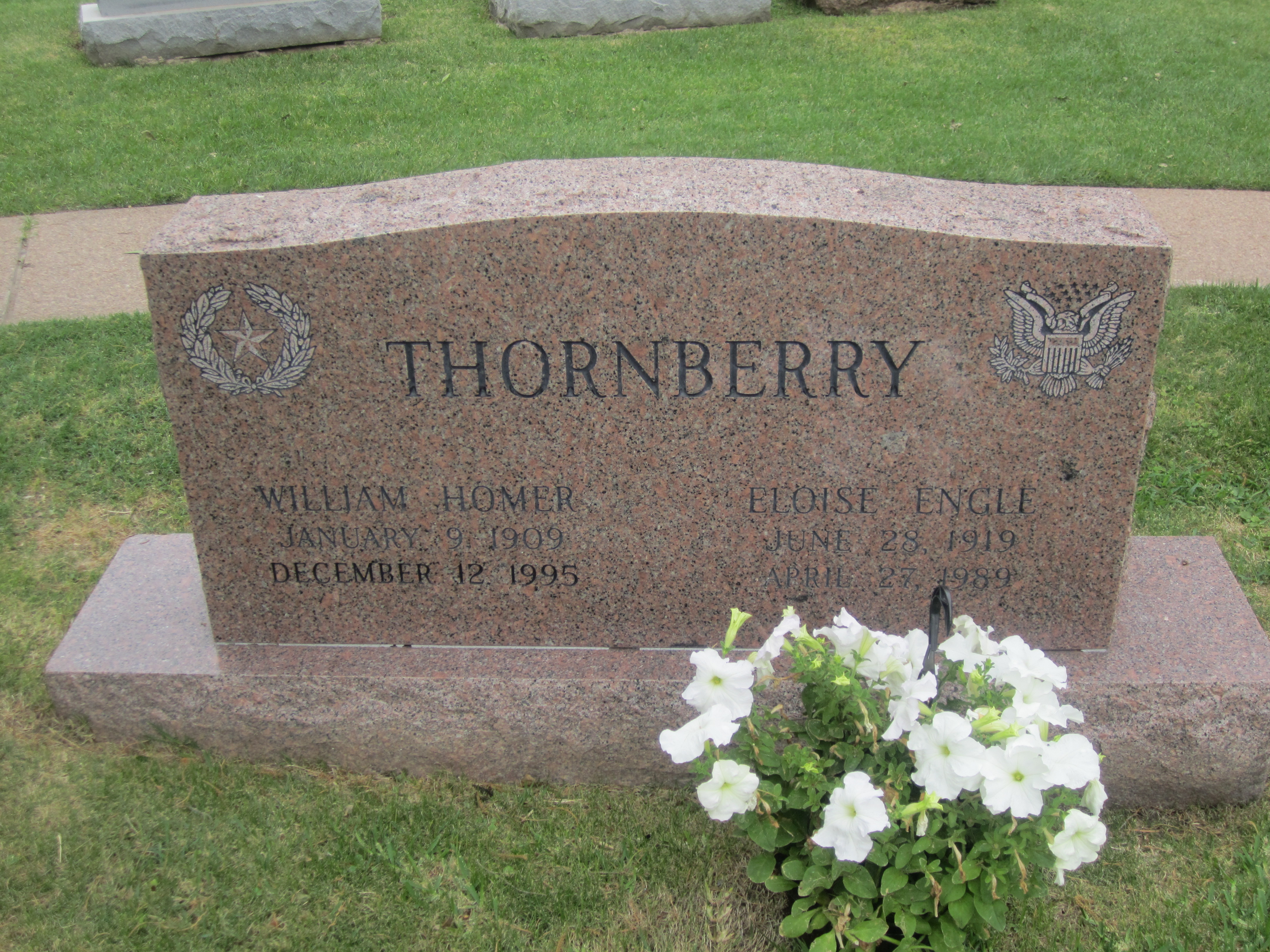
Homer Thornberry grave marker at Texas State Cemetery.

Thornberry died on December 12, 1995, at his home in Austin and was interred at the Texas State Cemetery in Austin.

He was first married to the former Eloise Engle (1919–1989). After her death he wed Marian Davis. With his first wife, Thornberry was the father of three children, Molly, David, and Kate. He received an honorary doctorate degree from Gallaudet University in 1954.

== Sources ==
- "William Homer Thornberry". Biographical Directory of the United States Congress.
- "William Thornberry". Texas State Cemetery. Retrieved 20 June 2005.
- Thomas Jr., Robert McG. (December 13, 1995). "Homer Thornberry, Appeals Judge, Dies at 86". New York Times.
- "Thornberry". The Alcalde. Vol. LIV, no. V. Austin, Texas: Ex-Students' Association, University of Texas. January 1996. pp. 11–12. The University of Texas Alumni Magazine
- Ybarra, Bob (2010). My Demons Were Real: Constitutional Lawyer Joseph Calamia's Journey. Houston, TX: Arte Publico Press. p. 20. ISBN 9781558856974. LCCN 2010033240. "homer thornberry district attorney."

U.S. House of Representatives
Preceded by Lyndon B. Johnson	Member of the United States House of Representatives from Texas's 12th congressional district 1949–1963	Succeeded by J. J. Pickle
Legal offices
Preceded by R. Ewing Thomason	Judge of the United States District Court for the Western District of Texas; 1963–1965	Succeeded by Jack Roberts
Preceded by Joseph Chappell Hutcheson Jr.	Judge of the United States Court of Appeals for the Fifth Circuit; 1965–1978	Succeeded by Reynaldo Guerra Garza
