= Leonard Anderson =

Filmmaker

Leonard Anderson was an American film editor and film director, and he co-owned a film production company. Anderson's short films of African-American musical acts include footage of Anna Mae Winburn with the International Sweethearts of Rhythm, Lucky Millinder and his orchestra, and Henri Woode.

Around late 1948, he founded the Video Varieties Corp., a film production company with George Goman, which was a predecessor to the West Coast Sound Studios. In late 1948, Anderson directed a series of short films for the band the Adrian Rollini Trio (Adrian Rollini, George Hnida, and Allan Hanlon). He edited the popular television show The Honeymooners in the 1950s.

== Filmography ==
=== Director ===
- Lucky Millinder and his Orchestra (1946).
- Adventure (1946)
- Big Fat Mamas (1946), a "Soundie" cut from the film Lucky Millinder and His Orchestra
- Runaway (1946)
- Hello Bill (1946)
- I Cried for You (1946)
- I Want a Man (1946)
- I Want to Talk About You (1946)
- Love in Syncopation (1946)
- That Man of Mine (1946)
- Jump Children (1946), featuring the International Sweethearts of Rhythm
- Lonesome Lover Blues (1946)
- Mistletoe (1946)
- She's Crazy with Heat (1946)
- That Man of Mine (1946)
- You Call it Madness (1946)
- Hello Bill (1946), produced by William D. Alexander one of three soundies cut from Lucky Millinder and His Orchestra
- Jivin' in Be-Bop (1947)
- Harlem Dynamite, a 30-minute short edited from the feature Jivin' in Be-Bop
- Rhythm in a Riff (1947)
- I Want to Talk About You, a 30-minute short edited from Rhythm in a Riff
- Lonesome Road Blues (1949), soundie of Shorty Warren and his cowboy orchestra
- Lonsesome Lover Blues, excerpted from Rhythm in a Riff

=== Editor ===
- Whispering City (1947)
- Reet, Petite and Gone (1947)
- Lamp Post Favorites (1948)
- Citizen Saint, a Catholic documentary
- Singing in the Dark (1956), about a Holocaust surviving singer in New York City who has amnesia
