= Singing the Blues (disambiguation) =

Singing the Blues (also Singin' the Blues) is a 1956 song written by Melvin Endsley and recorded by Marty Robbins.

== Films ==
Singin' the Blues (1948), an animated sing-along film that is part of Sing and Be Happy (series)

== Music ==
=== Albums ===
- Singin' the Blues (B.B. King album)
- Singin' the Blues (Jimmy Witherspoon album) 1958
- Singing the Blues (Brook Benton album) 1962
- Singing the Blues (Connee Boswell album)

=== Songs ===
- Singin' the Blues (1920 song), composition by Robinson, Conrad, Lewis, and Young, lyrics added by Aileen Stanley 1920
