= Jimmy Wright (actor) =

American actor

Jimmy Wright was an American stage and film actor. A member of the all-black cast of the Voodoo Macbeth production directed by Orson Welles in 1936, Wright went on to star as 'Dollar Bill' Burton in Souls of Sin, a 1949 feature directed by Powell Lindsay and produced by William D. Alexander that has been described as the last race film from a black producer. In 1980, credited as "Jim Wright," he played Father Brown in Personal Problems, a "meta soap opera" directed by Bill Gunn and written by Ishmael Reed, but died between production of the first and second episodes.
