= Love in Syncopation =

1946 film by Leonard Anderson

Love in Syncopation is a 1946 musical comedy film released in the United States. The film featured Henri Woode and his band as well as Ruby Dee. Leonard Anderson directed and William D. Alexander produced. The film features dance and musical performances including by the Congaroos.

The cast included Harrel Tillman who went on to become a reverend, lawyer, and judge in Houston, Texas. He is credited as the state's first African American judge.

The Pittsburgh Courier did an extensive write up of the film when it was released. The Courier praised the film as fast moving, full of musical variety, and lauded it for progressing African American cinema.

== Cast ==
- Henri Woode and His Band
- Ruby Dee
- Maxine Johnson
- Harrel Tillman
- Powell Lindsay
- June Eckstine (wife of Billy Eckstine)
- Taps and Wilda
- Ronell and Edna
