= Jivin' in Be-Bop =

1946 film by Spencer Williams Jr.

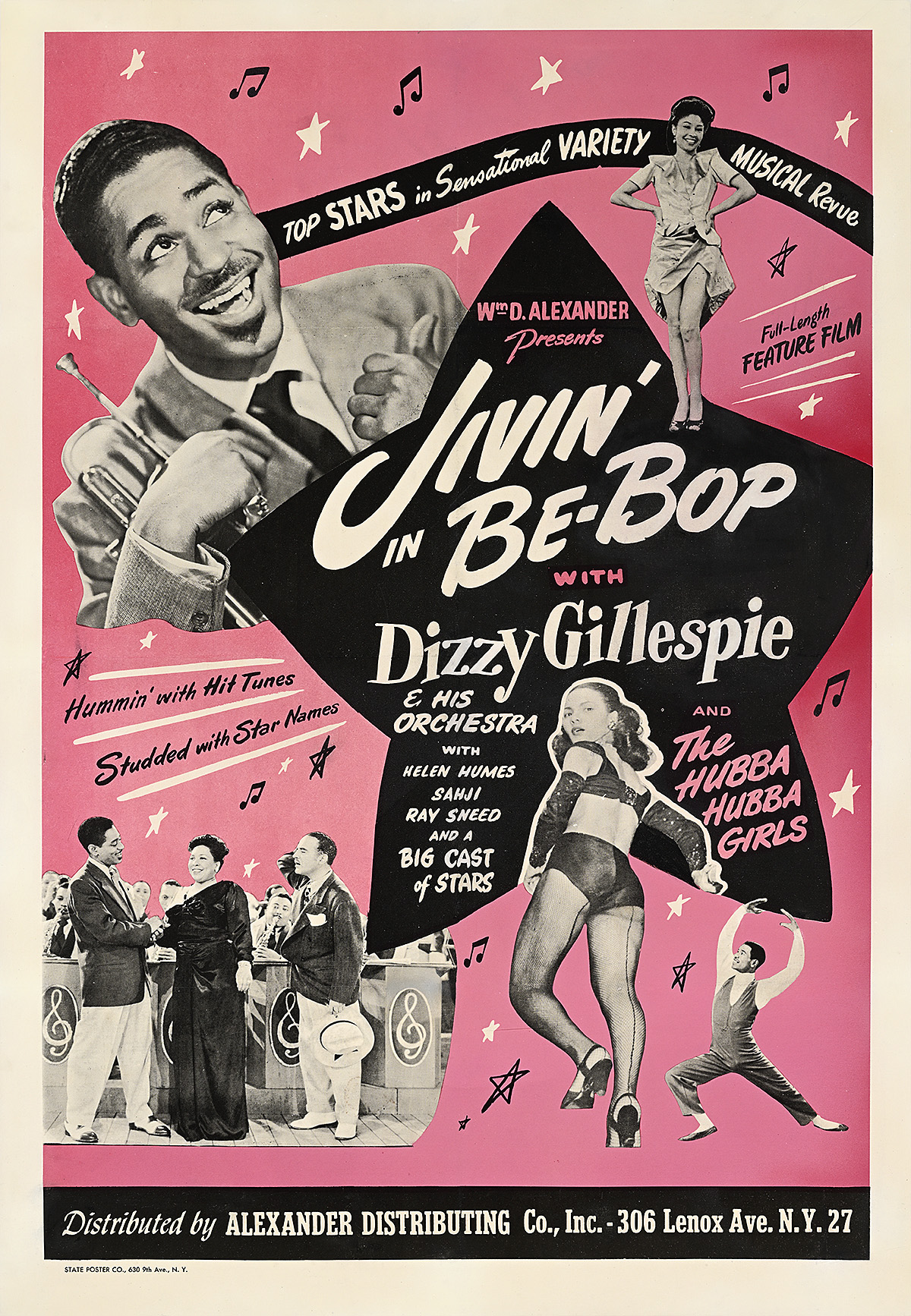
- Promotional poster
- Directed by: Leonard Anderson; Spencer Williams
- Written by: Powell Lindsay
- Produced by: William D. Alexander
- Starring: Dizzy Gillespie and His Orchestra; Helen Humes
- Cinematography: Don Malkames
- Edited by: Gladys Brothers
- Production company: Alexander Productions
- Distributed by: Alexander Distributing Company Inc.
- Release date: 1947
- Running time: 57 minutes
- Country: United States
- Language: English

Jivin' in Be-Bop is a 1947 musical film produced by William D. Alexander and starring Dizzy Gillespie and His Orchestra, which included notable musicians such as bassist Ray Brown, vibraphonist Milt Jackson, and pianist John Lewis. It also features singers Helen Humes and Kenny "Pancho" Hagood, Master of Ceremonies Freddie Carter, and a group of dancers.

== Content ==
The film consists of a plotless revue presented in a theatrical setting, offering a total of 19 musical and dance numbers. Gillespie and his band are shown performing eight songs, including "Salt Peanuts", "One Bass Hit", "Oop Bop Sh'Bam" and "He Beeped When He Should Have Bopped". The band plays off-camera while dancers perform during the remaining songs, which include "Shaw 'Nuff", "A Night in Tunisia", "Grosvenor Square" and "Ornithology".

== Production ==
The liner notes that accompany the DVD release suggest the tracks were prerecorded. One of Gillespie's biographers confirms this, although at least one critic believes the musicians were playing live.

== Reception ==
The dance sequences have been described as "dull and frequently silly" by writer Phil Hall, who wrote that Jivin' in Be-Bop includes "one of the worst ballets ever put on film". Gillespie's dancing, on the other hand, is generally praised. One writer said "his unique technique is shown to great effect" in the film. One biographer described Gillespie "skipping about the stage", and another wrote that Gillespie was "quite happy to dance to the band's sounds, ... spinning around and mugging in front of the band".

Between songs, Carter tells jokes and banters with Gillespie. Film historian Donald Bogle described the comic routines as "dull-witted". Bogle went on: "There are only two redeeming factors here: namely Dizzy Gillespie and vocalist Helen Humes. Otherwise the proceedings are pretty dreary."

== Home media ==
A 1993 video, Things to Come, included the eight on-screen performances by Gillespie and the band from Jivin' in Be-Bop, together with some numbers from another Alexander-produced musical, Rhythm in a Riff, which featured Billy Eckstine.

Jivin' in Be-Bop was released on DVD in 2004. The between-song banter between Carter and Gillespie was cut. According to one reviewer, the DVD was produced from a badly damaged print, which made portions of the film "unwatchable".
