= Citizen Saint =

1947 film

- Directed by: Harold Young
- Written by: Harold Orlob
- Starring: Rev. E. V. Dailey; Carla Dare; Jed Prouty; Loraine Mae Martin
- Cinematography: Don Malkames
- Edited by: Leonard Anderson
- Music by: Arthur A. Norris
- Production company: Clyde Elliott Attractions
- Distributed by: State Rights
- Release date: 1947

Citizen Saint: The Life of Mother Cabrini is a 1947 film about a Catholic saint. It was directed by Harold Young. It was produced by Clyde Elliott Attractions. It is about Frances Xavier Cabrini, an Italian woman who becomes a nun and is eventually sainted. The film includes songs.

== Cast ==
- Rev. E. V. Dailey (narrator)
- Carla Dare as Francesca "Cecchina" Cabrini (later Mother Cabrini)
- Jed Prouty as Neil Hartley
- Loraine Mae Martin as Rhea
- Walter Butterworth as Junior
- Robin Morgan as Cecchina Cabrini
- Maurice Cavell as Anton
- William Harrigan as Father Vail
- June Harrison as Dorine
- Lucille Fenton as Antonia Tondini
- Lauretta Campeau as Salesia
- June DuFrayne as Veronica

== Reception ==
A review in Variety read, "Carla Dare plays the title role and does well by it. Best sequence is that in which she miraculously recalls Julie Hayden [sic], as sister Delfina, from death... Photography by Don Malkames and other credits are okay".

Grace Kingsley of The Los Angeles Times noted that it "makes up in sympathy in honesty what it lacks in so-called glamour," and continued, "Though the scenes of the picture are episodic, an impressive story is managed and the great woman's character is vividly limned". Kingsley also praised Dare's "moving, sensitive characterization as Cabrini" and predicted a great career for Dare.
