= Emmett "Babe" Wallace =

American singer, composer, actor

Emmett "Babe" Wallace (June 24, 1909 – December 3, 2006), was an American singer, stage performer, composer, actor, and poet. His decades long career included many years performing abroad in Europe and Israel. He featured on stage and screen. The New York Public Library has a collection of his papers in the Schomburg Center for Research in Black Culture.

== Biography ==
Wallace was born in Brooklyn, New York on June 24, 1909, to George Bason and Inez Wallace. Prior to 1950, his given name was spelled "Emmett," and after his name was spelled "Emett". He attended the Manual Training High School in Brooklyn but was unable to complete his education. He worked as busboy, messenger, and bouncer at the Savoy Ballroom in Harlem. Wallace had two children, a daughter from his marriage to Dorothy Hight, Carolyn Delores Wallace (born 1932 - 2001), and a son by Vivian Dandridge, Michael Emmett Wallace (born in 1943)

In 1935, Wallace was part of the cast of, Cotton Club Parade alongside Lena Horne, which was performed at the Cotton Club. Wallace composed the song "A Chicken Ain't Nothin' but a Bird" recorded by Cab Calloway in 1940. In 1945, he was to broadcast on the Gloom Dodgers show on radio station WHN. Wallace also appeared in Broadway's reproduction of the film classic "Guys and Dolls" and also contributed to the soundtrack to the play.

The New York Public Library has a collection of his papers and photographs of Wallace. Carl Van Vechten photographed him and Yale University Library has the images in its archives. In 1940, Wallace was selected to front the Ella Fitzgerald Orchestra on tour. he died in 2006.

== Filmography ==
- The Black Network (1936)
- The Devil's Daughter (1939) as John Lowden
- Stormy Weather (1943) as Chick Bailey
- Rhythm in a Riff (1946)
- The Fight Never Ends (1948)

== Compositions ==
- "A Chicken Ain't Nothin' but a Bird"
- "Get It, Get It, I Love to See You With It"
- "That Feeling is Gone"
- "America Forever"
- "Bring Enough Clothes for Three Days", Timmie Rogers recorded it and it was a hit.
- "Dorie Miller" about war hero Doris Miller
