= List of first minority male lawyers and judges in Texas =

This is a list of the first minority male lawyer(s) and judge(s) in Texas. It includes the year in which the men were admitted to practice law (in parentheses). Also included are other distinctions such as the first minority men in their state to graduate from law school or become a political figure.

== Firsts in state history ==
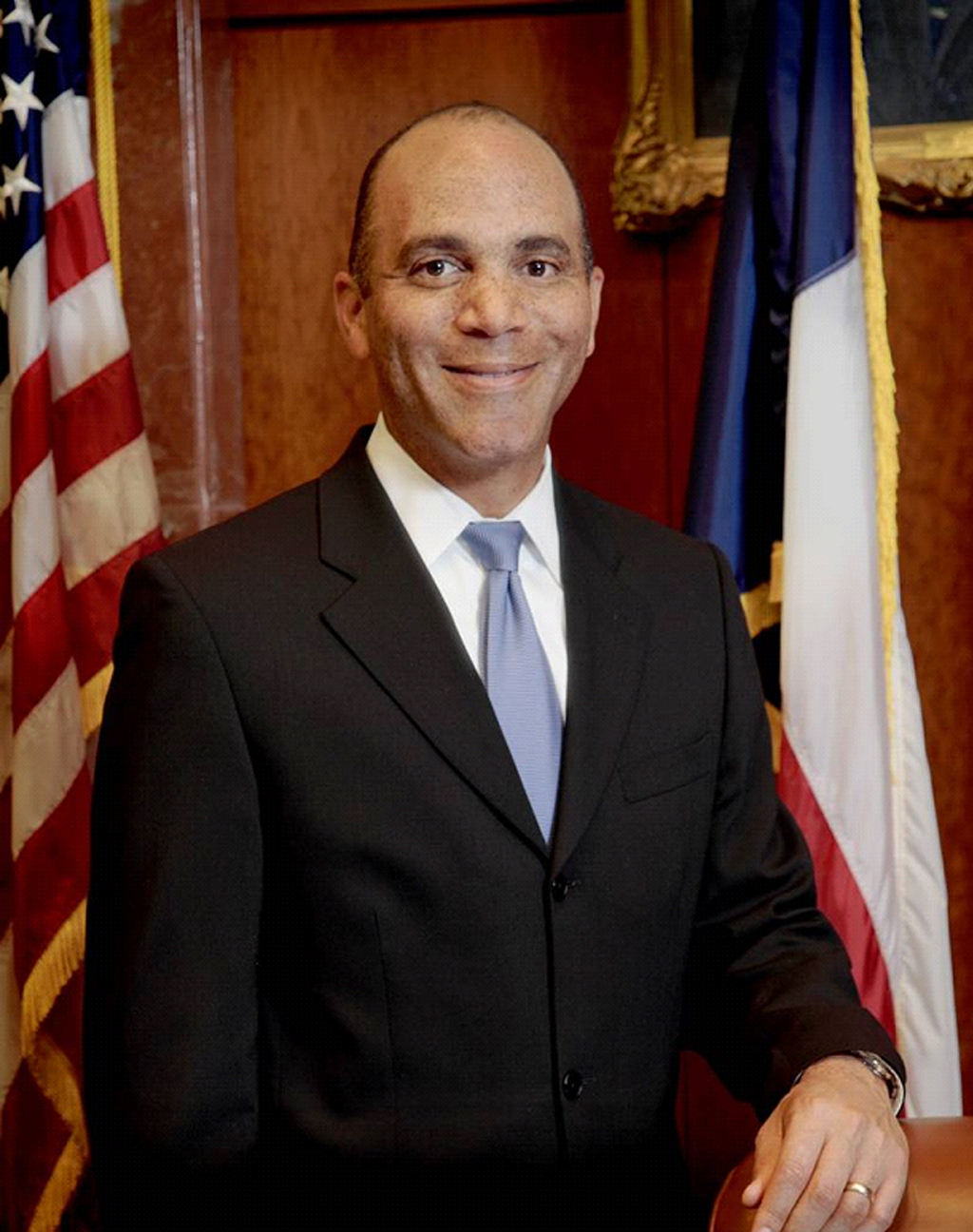
Wallace B. Jefferson: First African American male Justice (2001) and Chief Justice (2004) of the Texas Supreme Court

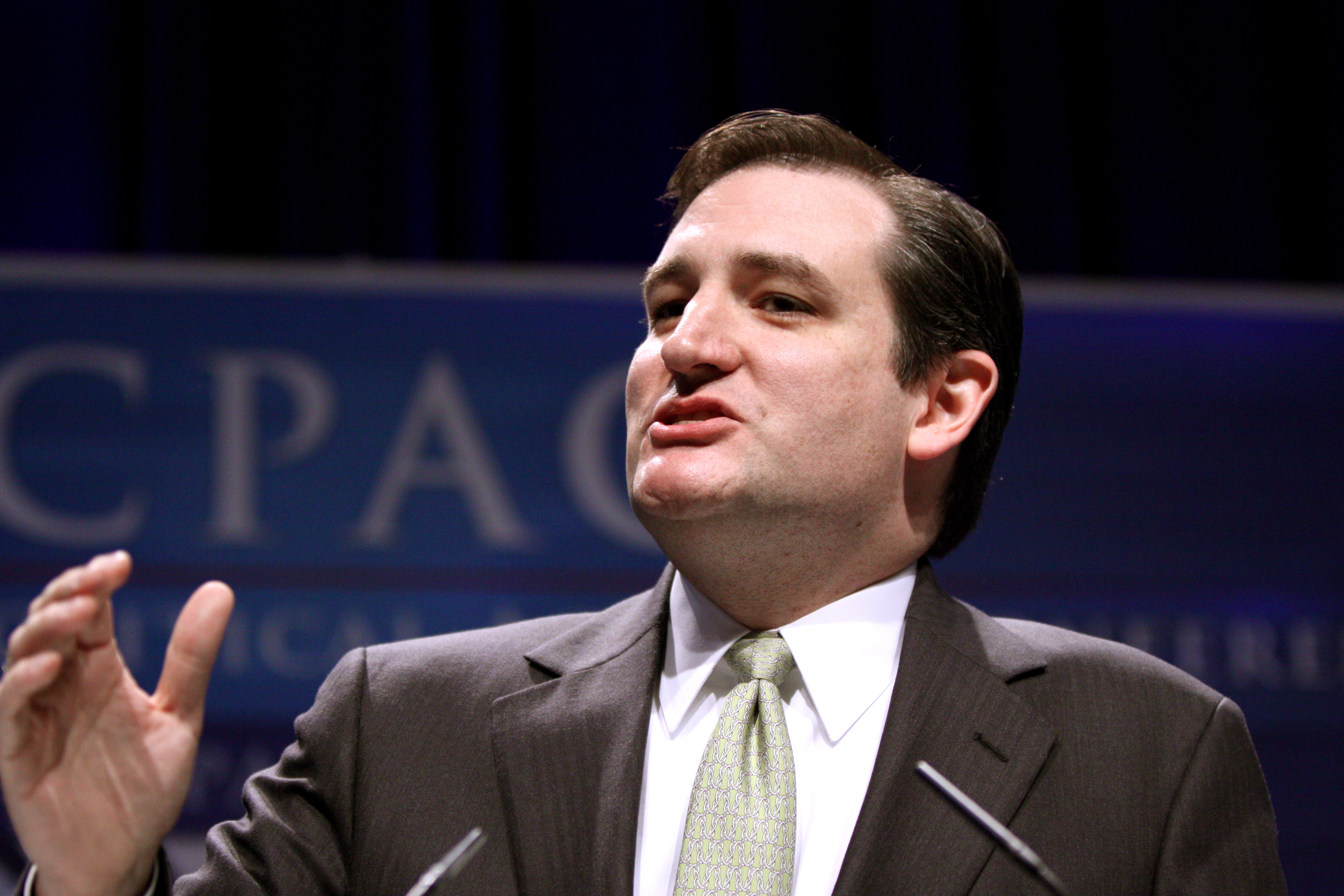
Ted Cruz: First Hispanic American male Solicitor General of Texas (2003)

=== Lawyers ===
- William A. Price (1873) and Allen W. Wilder (1873) First African American male lawyers in Texas. Due to his mixed ancestry, Price was also the first Native American male lawyer in Texas.
- John N. Johnson (1883): First African American male lawyer admitted to practice before the Supreme Court of Texas
- José Tomás Canales (1899), Manuel C. Gonzales (1924), and Alonso S. Perales (1926): First Mexican American male lawyers respectively in Texas
- Wellington Yee Chew (1951) and Jimmie F.Y. Lee (1957): First Chinese American male lawyers respectively in Texas

=== Judicial Officers ===
==== State ====
===== Judges =====
- William A. Price (1873): First African American male judge in Texas. He may also be considered the first Native American male judge in Texas.
- Sam Eng, Sr.: First Chinese American male to serve as a municipal court judge in Texas (c. 1960s)
- Harrel Tillman (1962): First African American male to serve as a municipal court judge in Texas (1964)
- Carlos Cadena (1940): First Hispanic American male to serve as a Chief Justice of a Texas court (1977)
- Jerry Birdwell: First openly LGBT male judge in Texas (1992)
- John Paul Barnich (1980): First openly LGBT male to become a city judge in Texas (1999)
- Jay (Ceyhun) Karahan: First Turkish American male judge in Texas (2003)
- Jim Evans: First openly LGBT male to become a family court judge in Texas (2017)
- Nick Chu: First Asian American male to serve as a Justice of the Peace in Texas (2017)
- Jason Luong: First Asian American male (who is of Vietnamese descent) elected as a criminal district court judge in Texas (2019)

====== County Court ======
- Elisha Demerson: First African American male to serve as a county judge in Texas (1986)

==== District Court ====
- Steven Kirkland: First openly LGBT male elected district court judge in Texas (2009)
- Ravi Sandill: First South Asian male district court judge in Texas (2009)

===== Appellate Court =====
- Henry E. Doyle: First African American male to serve as an appellate judge in Texas (1978)
- Albert Armendariz, Sr. (1950): First Hispanic American male appointed as a Judge of the Texas Court of Appeals (1986)
- Louis Sturns: First African American male appointed as a Judge of the Texas Court of Criminal Appeals (1990)
- Morris Overstreet (1975): First African American male elected as a Judge of the Texas Court of Criminal Appeals (1991)
- Fortunato "Pete" Benavides: First Latino American male to serve as Judge on the Texas Court of Criminal Appeals
- Charles A. Spain: First openly LGBT male to serve as an appellate judge in Texas (2019)

===== Supreme Court =====
- Raul A. Gonzalez Jr. (1966): First Hispanic American male appointed as an Associate Justice of the Texas Supreme Court (1984)
- David Wellington Chew: First Asian American male to serve as a Justice (1995) and Chief Justice of the Supreme Court of Texas (2006)
- Wallace B. Jefferson: First African American male appointed as a Justice of the Texas Supreme Court (2001) and Chief Justice (2004)

==== Federal ====
- Robert L. Pitman: First openly LGBT male to become a federal judge in Texas (2014)

===== District Court =====
- Reynaldo Guerra Garza: First Hispanic American male appointed as a Judge of the U.S. District Court for the Southern District of Texas (1974)
- Hipolito Frank Garcia (1951): First Hispanic American male appointed as a Judge of the U.S. District Court for the Western District of Texas (1979)
- Sam A. Lindsay (1977): First African American male appointed as a Judge of the U.S. District Court for the Northern District of Texas (1998)
- Jason K. Pulliam: First African American male appointed as a Judge of the U.S. District Court for the Western District of Texas (2019)

=== Attorney General ===
- Dan Morales (c. 1981): First Mexican American male to serve as the Attorney General of Texas (1990)

=== Solicitor General ===
- Ted Cruz (c. 1995): First Hispanic American male to serve as the Solicitor General of Texas (2003-2008)
- James C. Ho: First Asian American male to serve as the Solicitor General of Texas (2008–2010)

=== United States Attorney ===
- Jose Antonio "Tony" Canales: First Hispanic American male to serve as the United States Attorney for the Southern District of Texas (1977)
- Robert L. Pitman: First openly LGBT male to serve as a U.S. Attorney in Texas (2011-2014)
- Nicholas Ganjei: First person of color to serve as the United States Attorney for the Eastern District of Texas (2021)
- Alamdar S. Hamdani: First Asian American male to serve as the U.S. Attorney for the Southern District of Texas (2022)
- Damien Diggs: First African American male to serve as the United States Attorney for the Eastern District of Texas (2023)

=== District Attorney ===
- William A. Price (1873) and Craig Watkins (1994): First African American males elected respectively as a District Attorney in Texas (1876; 2006). Price was also the first Native American male to serve as a District Attorney in Texas.

=== Assistant District Attorney ===
- Ollice Maloy, Jr.: First African American male to serve as an Assistant District Attorney in Texas (1959)

=== Political Office ===
- Ted Cruz (c. 1995): First Hispanic American male to serve as the United States Senator from Texas (2013)

=== Bar Association ===
- Richard Pena: First Hispanic American male (and first minority in general) to serve as the President of the State Bar of Texas (1998)
- Rehan Alimohammad: First Asian American male and immigration law attorney to serve as Chair of the Board for the State Bar of Texas

== Firsts in local history ==
Alphabetized by county name

=== Regions ===
- Harold Valderas: First Latino American male to serve as a judge in North Texas (1971) and district court judge in Central Texas (1977)
- Don B. Chae: First Asian American male lawyer (1980) and judge (1995) in North Texas
- William Melvin Schultz (c. 1960): First Jewish American male lawyer in the Southern District of Texas
- George W. Fremont (1879): First African American male lawyer in San Antonio, Texas [Bexar, Medina, and Comal Counties, Texas]
- Joe L. Aguilar, Jr.: First Hispanic American male to serve as a municipal court judge in Baytown, Texas [Chambers and Harris Counties, Texas]
- Bennie R. Juarez: First Mexican American judge in Dallas, Texas (1971) [Dallas, Collin, Denton, Kaufman, Rockwall Counties, Texas]
- Khalid Y. Hamideh: First Arab American male lawyer in Dallas, Texas [Dallas, Collin, Denton, Kaufman, Rockwall Counties, Texas]
- William Sim: First Asian American male to graduate from the University of Houston Bates College of Law
- Tony Bonilla: First Latino American male to graduate from the University of Houston Law Center (1960)
- Michael Shepherd: First African American male prosecutor in Northeast Texas (c. 1988; Bowie County, Texas)
- Stephen Zamora: First Hispanic American male to serve as the Dean of the University of Houston Law Center (1995)
- Armando V. Rodriguez: First Hispanic American judge in the municipal court of Houston, Texas and to be appointed as the Harris County Justice of the Peace by Commissioners Court [Harris, Fort Bend, and Montgomery Counties, Texas]
- John Paul Barnich (1980): First openly LGBT male to become a city judge in Houston, Texas (1999) [Harris, Fort Bend, and Montgomery Counties, Texas]
- John N. Johnson (1883): First African American male lawyer in Austin, Texas [Hays, Travis, and Williamson Counties, Texas]
- Rogelio Fernandez Munoz (1974): First Latino American male to serve as the District Attorney for the 38th Judicial District [Medina, Real and Uvalde Counties, Texas]

=== Anderson County ===
- O’Neal Hunt: First African American male judge in Anderson County, Texas

=== Austin County ===
- Richard Pena: First Hispanic American male (and first minority in general) to serve as the President of the Austin Bar Association, Texas (1990)
- Joseph C. Parker Jr.: First African-American male to serve as the President of the Austin Bar Association, Texas (1996)
- Ramey Ko: First Asian American male judge in Austin County and Travis County, Texas (2010)

=== Bastrop County ===
- Orange Hicks: First African American male Justice of the Peace in Bastrop County, Texas (1888)
- Ronnie McDonald: First African American male judge in Bastrop County, Texas (1999)

=== Bexar County ===
- John C. Alaniz (1957): First Hispanic American male (a lawyer) elected to the Texas State House of Representatives from Bexar County, Texas (1960)
- Andrew L. Jefferson Jr. (1959): First African American male to serve as the Assistant District Attorney of Bexar County, Texas (1961)
- John. G. Benavides: First Mexican American male appointed as a district court judge in Bexar County, Texas (1969)
- Albert G. Bustamante: First Hispanic American male elected as a judge in Bexar County, Texas (1979)
- Fred G. Rodriguez: First Hispanic American male to serve as the (Criminal) District Attorney of Bexar County, Texas (1987)
- Tommy Calvert: First African American male to serve on the Commissioners Court for Bexar County, Texas (2014)
- Peter Sakai: First Asian American male judge in Bexar County, Texas (2023)

=== Caldwell County ===
- M. Louis Cisneros: First Latino American male to serve as the Justice of the Peace in Caldwell County, Texas

=== Cameron County ===
- Ray Ramon: First Latino American male judge in Cameron County, Texas (c. 1970s)
- Abel Toscano Jr. (1952): First Hispanic American male lawyer in Harlingen, Cameron County, Texas
- Alfredo A. Garcia: First Hispanic American male to serve as a municipal court judge in San Benito, Cameron County, Texas

=== Comal County ===
- Gregorio Coronado (1957): First Hispanic American male lawyer in Comal, Guadalupe, and Lubbock Counties, Texas

=== Crockett County ===
- Frank Tambunga: First Latino American male judge in Crockett County, Texas

=== Dallas County ===
- S.H. Scott (1881): First African American male lawyer in Dallas, Texas [Dallas County, Texas]
- George Washington Jr.: First African American male to serve as an Assistant District Attorney in Dallas County, Texas
- Felix Hilario Garcia: First Mexican (male) citizen to graduate from the Southern Methodist University (1931) [Dallas County, Texas]
- Louis A. Bedford Jr. (1951): First African American male judge in Dallas County, Texas (1966)
- Frank P. Hernández: First Latino American male (who was of Mexican descent) judge in Dallas County, Texas (1977)
- Thomas Jones: First African American male to serve as the Justice of the Peace for the Oak Cliff Precinct District, Texas (1990) [Dallas County, Texas]
- Craig Watkins: First African American male District Attorney for Dallas County, Texas (2007)

=== Dimmit County ===
- Rodrigo L. Guerra: First Hispanic American male judge in Dimmit County, Texas (1982)

=== Ector County ===
- Richard Abalos (c. 1970s): First Hispanic American male lawyer in Odessa, Ector County, Texas
- Jose Antonio "Tony" Chavez: First Hispanic American male to serve as the District Attorney of Ector County, Texas (1978)

=== El Paso County ===
- Frank Feuille, Jr: First male lawyer of French descent in El Paso, El Paso County, Texas
- Joe Calamia: First male lawyer of Italian descent in El Paso, Texas
- Frank Galvan: Reputed to be the first Mexican American male lawyer in El Paso, El Paso County, Texas
- Albert Armendariz, Sr. (1950): First Hispanic American male to serve as a federal judge in El Paso, Texas (1976)
- George Rodriguez: First Hispanic American to serve as the President of the El Paso Bar Association, Texas

=== Fort Bend County ===
- William A. Price (1873): First African American male District Attorney for Fort Bend County, Texas (1876)
- Sam Eng, Sr.: First Chinese American male to serve as a municipal court judge in Houston, Texas (c. 1960s)
- James DeAnda (1950): First Hispanic American male judge in Houston, Texas (1979)
- Brian Middleton: First African American male to serve as the District Attorney for Fort Bend County, Texas (2018)
- K.P. George: First Indian American male judge in Fort Bend County, Texas (2018)

=== Galveston County ===
- George Hanks Jr.: First African American male to serve as a U.S. District Court judge in Galveston County, Texas

=== Guadalupe County ===
- Gregorio Coronado (1957): First Hispanic American male lawyer in Comal, Guadalupe, and Lubbock Counties, Texas

=== Harris County ===
- Charles M. Smith (1892): First African American male lawyer in Harris County, Texas
- Andrew L. Jefferson Jr. (1959): First African American to serve as a Judge of the 208th Criminal Court in Harris County, Texas (1974)
- Steven Kirkland: First openly LGBT male to serve as a Harris County district judge (2009)
- Jason Luong: First Asian American male (who is of Vietnamese descent) to serve as a district court judge in Harris County, Texas (2019)
- Alfred J. Hernandez: First Hispanic American male judge in Harris County, Texas
- A.D. Azios: First Hispanic American male elected as a criminal district judge in Harris County Texas
- Roland Garcia, Jr.: First minority male elected as the President of the Harris County Bar Association, Texas
- Christian Menefee: First African American male to serve as Harris County Attorney (2020)
- Howard Wolf (1959): First Jewish American male lawyer to join a major law firm in Houston, Harris County, Texas (
- Otis King: First African American male to serve as the City Attorney of Houston, Harris County, Texas (1976)
- Ed Cazares: First Latino American male to serve as the City Attorney of Houston, Harris County, Texas (1980)
- Jose Cantu: First Hispanic American male judge in Pasadena, Harris County, Texas

=== Hays County ===
- Ruben Becerra: First Latino American male judge in Hays County, Texas (2019)

=== Jefferson County ===
- Donald J. Floyd: First male judge (and African American) appointed to the Court at-law in Jefferson County, Texas
- "Lupe" Flores: First Hispanic American male judge in Jefferson County, Texas

=== Jim Wells County ===
- Roberto Guerra: First Mexican American male judge in Jim Wells County, Texas

=== Kaufman County ===
- Shelton Gibbs IV: First African American male to serve as a Judge of the 422nd District Court (2020; Kaufman County, Texas)

=== La Salle County ===
- Leodoro Martinez, Jr.: First Hispanic American male judge in La Salle County, Texas (1983)

=== Limestone County ===
- William Henry Twine: First African American male lawyer in Limestone County, Texas

=== Lubbock County ===
- Gregorio Coronado (1957): First Hispanic American male lawyer in Comal, Guadalupe, and Lubbock Counties, Texas
- Sam Medina (1976): First Hispanic American male appointed as a Judge of County Court (1995) and serve as Presiding Judge of the 237th District Court (1998) Lubbock County, Texas

=== McLennan County ===
- Richard D. (R.D.) Evans (1912): First African American male lawyer in Waco, McLennan County, Texas
- Fernando Villarreal: First Hispanic American male judge in McLennan County, Texas

=== Nueces County ===
- Margarito C. Garza: First Hispanic American male judge in Nueces County, Texas (1972)
- Carlos Valdez: First Hispanic American male to serve as the District Attorney of Nueces County, Texas (1992)
- Lorenzo Rojas: First Hispanic American male to serve as the justice of the peace for Robstown, Nueces County, Texas

=== Potter County ===
- Elisha Demerson: First African American male to serve as a county judge in Potter County, Texas (1986)

=== Smith County ===
- Charles E. Coleman: First African American male lawyer in Tyler, Texas (1946) [Smith County, Texas]
- Quincy Beavers: First African American male judge in Smith County, Texas
- Andy Navarro: First Hispanic American male to serve as the President of the Smith County Bar Association, Texas

=== Tarrant County ===
- Ollice Maloy, Jr.: First African American male to serve as the Assistant District Attorney of Tarrant County, Texas (1959)
- L. Clifford Davis: First African American male judge in Tarrant County, Texas (1984)

=== Taylor County ===
- Jorge Antonio Solis: First Hispanic American male to serve as a District Attorney for Travis County, Texas

=== Tom Green County ===
- Dick Alcala: First Mexican American male to serve as the District Attorney of Tom Green County, Texas (1982)
- Eduardo Idar: First Mexican American male lawyer in San Angelo, Tom Green County, Texas

=== Travis County ===
- Alberto Garcia: First Latino American male judge in Travis County, Texas
- George C. Thomas: First Indian American male judge in Travis County, Texas
- Ramey Ko: First Asian American male judge in Austin County and Travis County, Texas (2010)
- Nick Chu: First Asian American male to serve as the Justice of the Peace for Travis County, Texas (2017)

=== Val Verde County ===
- Sergio Gonzales, Jr.: First Hispanic American male to serve as a County Judge of Val Verde County, Texas (1971)

=== Victoria County ===
- Manuel Velasco: First Mexican American male lawyer in Victoria, Victoria County, Texas
- Juan Velasquez: First Hispanic American male judge in Victoria County, Texas (2008)

=== Waller County ===
- Dewayne Charleston: First African American male judge in Waller County, Texas

=== Webb County ===
- Ezequiel Salinas: First Latino American male elected as the District Judge of Laredo, Webb County, Texas (1950)

=== Wichita County ===
- Robert Estrada (1976): First Hispanic American male lawyer in Wichita County, Texas

=== Willacy County ===
- Oscar Cavazos (c. 1951): First Hispanic American male lawyer in Willacy County, Texas

== See also ==
- List of first minority male lawyers and judges in the United States

== Other topics of interest ==
- List of first women lawyers and judges in the United States
- List of first women lawyers and judges in Texas
