= Personal Problems =

1980 film directed by Bill Gunn

- 2018 re-release poster
- Directed by: Bill Gunn
- Written by: Ishmael Reed
- Produced by: Walter Cotton
- Starring: Vertamae Smart-Grosvenor; Sam Waymon; Walter Cotton; Jim Wright
- Cinematography: Robert Polidori
- Edited by: Bill Gunn
- Music by: Carman Moore
- Release date: 1980
- Running time: 165 minutes
- Country: United States
- Language: English
- Budget: $40,000

Personal Problems is a 1980 film described as a "meta soap opera" directed by Bill Gunn and written by Ishmael Reed that depicts the life and romantic relationships of a nurse (played by Vertamae Smart-Grosvenor) living in Harlem. The film was originally intended to be broadcast on television, but the public television network PBS and others did not pick up the soap opera. It was shown across the United States at smaller screenings throughout the 1980s until it found renewed popularity after a screening in the late 2000s at the Brooklyn Academy of Music. The film was restored in 2018 by Kino Lorber and rereleased at the Metrograph theater in New York City.

The original soundtrack by composer Carman Moore was released for the first time in 2020 by Reading Group.

== Cast ==
- Vertamae Smart-Grosvenor as Johnnie Mae Brown
- Walter Cotton as Charles Brown
- Sam Waymon as Raymon
- Jim Wright as Father Brown

== Production ==
Some of the characters in Personal Problems were initially developed to be featured in a radio soap opera, but this later evolved into a thirty-minute video soap opera directed by Gunn and written by Ishmael. The only scene from this original thirty-minute version to appear in the 1980 version was a monologue by the character played by Sam Waymon.

The scenes in Personal Problems were shot using a videocassette recorder which was a new technology at the time (previously most films were shot using film stock).

Gunn was known for his improvisational style of directing and was known to let actors improvise during filming, with director of photography and cameraman Robert Polidori stating: "Bill was interested in improvisation, which made it a little harder to shoot" and "Bill would set up scenes as an experiment. He'd set up tensions and see how the tensions turned out".

== Reception ==
Glenn Kenny of the New York Times said of the film: "For all its rough edges, Personal Problems retains a vitality and an integrity that practically bounds off the screen." He also praised the film for its intimate depiction of African-American life in New York, stating, "it's intimate to the point of awkwardness." K. Austin Collins, writing for Vanity Fair, praised the movie as a "textually incomplete but spiritually overflowing accomplishment" and described it as "more than a clean narrative" which provided windows into a woman's life; "windows broad and intelligent enough to encompass a wide swathe of Black life generally, but free of neat narrative conclusions." Chuck Bowen of Slant Magazine gave the film four stars and applauded Gunn and Reed's intimate portrayal of the characters, stating: "Gunn and Reed collapse conventional notions of reality, providing simultaneous glimpses into the minds of dozens of characters, lingering on scenes and informing them with confessional intensity."
