= You Taught Me to Love Again =

Song
- Written: Tommy Dorsey
- Released: 1939
- Composer: Henri Woode

"You Taught Me to Love Again" is a 1939 song written and recorded by Tommy Dorsey and released as a 78 single.

Tommy Dorsey composed the music with Henri Woode while Charles Carpenter wrote the lyrics. The song was published by Larry Spier Music, Inc. The song was released as a Victor 78 single, 26154, by Tommy Dorsey and His Orchestra in 1939. The song appeared on the 2001 compilation album The Chronological Classics: Tommy Dorsey and His Orchestra: 1938-1939 on Classics.

== Other recordings ==
Gene Krupa and His Orchestra released the song as a 78 single on Brunswick, 8400, in 1939. Sarah Vaughan released the song on Columbia, 38810, in 1949 as a 78. The song appears on the album The Divine Sarah Vaughan: The Columbia Years, 1949-1953. Fletcher Henderson also performed the song with Chuck Richards on vocals for an NBC radio broadcast released on the 1994 collection Fletcher Henderson: Live At The Grand Terrace, Chicago, 1938 on Jazz Band.
