= David Counts =

American judge (born 1961)

Walter David Counts III
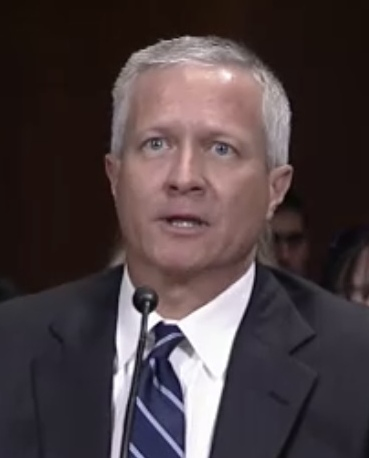

Judge of the United States District Court for the Western District of Texas
- Incumbent
- Assumed office January 17, 2018
- Appointed by: Donald Trump
- Preceded by: Robert A. Junell

Magistrate Judge of the United States District Court for the Western District of Texas
- In office 2009 – January 17, 2018

Personal details
- Born: Walter David Counts III; 1961 (age 64–65) Knox City, Texas, U.S.
- Education: Texas Tech University (BA); St. Mary's University (JD)

Military service
- Allegiance: United States
- Branch/service: United States Army; Texas Army National Guard
- Years of service: 1989–2019
- Rank: Colonel
- Battles/wars: Afghanistan War
- Awards: See list: Legion of Merit Bronze Star Medal Meritorious Service Medal (2) Army Commendation Medal (3) Army Achievement Medal Army Reserve Components Achievement Medal (5) National Defense Service Medal Afghanistan Campaign Medal Global War on Terrorism Service Medal Armed Forces Reserve Medal Army Service Ribbon Overseas Service Ribbon Army Reserve Components Overseas Training Ribbon (6) Texas Outstanding Service Medal Texas Combat Service Ribbon Texas Faithful Service Medal (4)

Walter David Counts III (born 1961) is a United States district judge of the United States District Court for the Western District of Texas. He was formerly a United States magistrate judge of the same court.

== Biography ==
Counts received a Bachelor of Arts degree in 1983 from Texas Tech University. He received a Juris Doctor in 1986 from St. Mary's University School of Law. He began his legal career as an associate at the law firm of Martin, Cox, Greenberg & Jones. From 1987 to 1995, he served as an Assistant District Attorney for the Travis County District Attorney's Office, with the exception of a six-month period from 1990 to 1991, when he worked as a solo practitioner. From 1995 to 2009, he served as an Assistant United States Attorney for the Western District of Texas. From 2009 to 2018, Counts served as a United States magistrate judge of the United States District Court for the Western District of Texas. Concurrently with his other service, Counts has served in the Texas National Guard since 1986, serving as a State Judge Advocate since 2006. He currently holds the rank of colonel.

== Federal judicial service ==
=== Expired district court nomination under Obama ===
On March 15, 2016, President Barack Obama nominated Counts to serve as a United States District Judge of the United States District Court for the Western District of Texas, to the seat vacated by Judge Robert A. Junell, who assumed senior status on February 13, 2015. On September 7, 2016, a hearing before the Senate Judiciary Committee was held on his nomination. His nomination expired on January 3, 2017, with the end of the 114th Congress.

=== Renomination to district court under Trump ===
His renomination was announced on September 7, 2017. On September 11, 2017, his nomination was officially sent to the Senate. He was renominated to the same seat. On October 26, 2017, his nomination was reported out of committee by a voice vote. On January 11, 2018, the United States Senate invoked cloture on his nomination by a 90–1 vote. Counts was confirmed later that day by a 96–0 vote. He received his judicial commission on January 17, 2018.

=== Notable rulings ===
On September 19, 2022, he declared that felony defendants (i.e. people who are under felony indictment) have a right to buy guns, striking down a federal law that stipulated the opposite.

== See also ==
- Barack Obama judicial appointment controversies

Legal offices
Preceded by Robert A. Junell	Judge of the United States District Court for the Western District of Texas; 2018–present	Incumbent
