= Hortense Allen Jordan =

African-American dancer, choreographer and costume designer

Hortense Allen Jordan (September 17, 1919 – March 15, 2008) was an African-American dancer, choreographer, costume designer, and producer.

== Personal life ==
Born Hiawatha Hortense Allen, Jordan was born on September 17, 1919. She had 12 siblings and was raised in East St. Louis, Illinois. Hortense Jordan married Philadelphia detective Theodore Jordan in 1955. She had three sons, Dewey Allen, Theodore Jordan Sr. and Philip Allen. Hortense Jordan died on March 15, 2008, due to heart failure.

== Career ==
She started her dance career when she was fourteen years old. Jordan was mentored by and worked with Leonard Reed and Larry Steele early on in her career. In 1947, Jordan appeared with Billy Eckstine and his orchestra in the movie Rhythm in a Riff. In the 1950s, Jordan was dancing and leading chorus lines at the Paramount Theater, Apollo Theater, Club Harlem, and the Robin Hood Dell. In the 1970s, Jordan led a mostly African-American woman dance troupe based in Philadelphia referred to as the Hortense Allen Dancers. The Hortense Allen Dancers performed frequently at the Robin Hood Dell throughout the 1970s and accompanied performances by Lionel Hampton, Count Basie, and Woody Herman.

Jordan was the 1995 artistic director for Stepping in Time, a music and dance performance composed of African American performers that was sponsored and produced by the Philadelphia Folklore Project. Jordan's dancing career was also featured in the video documentary Plenty of Good Women Dancers that was broadcast on public television in 2004.
