= Ann Baker (singer) =

American singer

Background information
- Also known as: Anna Beatrice Baker Wagner
- Born: August 21, 1915; Washington, Pennsylvania
- Died: August 29, 1999 (aged 84) Charleston, West Virginia
- Genres: Jazz
- Occupation: Singer

Ann Baker (August 21, 1915 – August 29, 1999) was an American jazz singer. Baker was discovered by Louie Armstrong and played with his band on Broadway. She is best known for her time spent as a member of Billy Eckstine's band, "The Dream Band" where she performed with Charlie Parker, Dizzy Gillespie, Dexter Gordon, Miles Davis and Art Blakey.

She retired in Charleston, West Virginia, where she was known as the "First Lady of Jazz". Bob Hope once told an interviewer his favorite jazz singer was "Little ol' Ann Baker." In 2008, Baker was inducted into the West Virginia Musician Hall of Fame.

== Early life and career ==
Baker was born on August 21, 1915, in Washington, Pennsylvania Baker started her career by performing in Pittsburgh jazz clubs, and by 1941, she was singing with Louie Armstrong and his band. She also played with the bands of Lionel Hampton and Count Basie.

In 1946, she replaced Sarah Vaughan in Billy Eckstine's band. Ecksteine's band included jazz legends Miles Davis, Charlie Parker, Art Blakey, and Dexter Gordon, throughout the years she performed with Eckstine. Baker was featured in the 1946 film Rhythm in a Riff in which she sang "I Cried For You."

== Retirement ==
In the late 1940s, Baker retired in Charleston, West Virginia, where she married barbecue restaurateur Delaney "Wag" Wagner. She stayed active in the jazz scene in Charleston, performing with local bands; The Earl Tate Trio, The Francis Taylor Trio, and the Billy J, Trio. Baker and her husband also founded The Shalamar Club, where Baker performed with singers Nat King Cole and Erroll Garner. She was still singing well into her 70s, and she became a regular guest at the West Virginia Jazz Festival. Additionally, she performed several times on Mountain Stage.

She died in Charleston on August 29, 1999 at age 84. Prior to her death, Baker had been in St. Francis Hospital in August 1999, undergoing surgery to remove a benign lung tumor.

In 2008, Baker was posthumously inducted into the West Virginia Musician Hall of Fame.

== See also ==
- 1930s in jazz
- 1940s in jazz
- Jazz improvisation
- List of jazz festivals
