= Harrel Tillman =

Texan judge, actor and ministor

Harrel Gordon Tillman Sr. (January 18, 1925 - June 19, 1998) was an actor who became an ordained minister and moved to Houston Texas where he also became a lawyer and judge. He was the first African-American judge in Texas.

Tillman was born January 18, 1923, in Wadesboro, North Carolina. He grew up in Philadelphia and graduated from Livingstone College in Salisbury, North Carolina. After college he moved to New York, where he had a brief stage career. Tillman then moved to Hollywood in 1947 where he appeared in a number of low budget films made with African American crews and casts including That Man of Mine, Love in Syncopation and The Fight Never Ends.

He left the movie business and joined the clergy of the African Methodist Episcopal church in New York City serving as an assistant pastor before becoming an ordained minister. In the early 1950s he was transferred to a church in Houston, and served as an ordained minister in the African Methodist Episcopal Zion Church, In Harlem he was an assistant pastor at Harlem's Church on the Hill and then he was the pastor at the Walls Chapel in Houston. Tillman led a gospel music program on local radio and hosted a talk show on radio station KYOK in Houston.

Tillman was admitted to the Texas bar in 1962 and in 1964 was named to the municipal court. He served as a general counsel on the Texas Joint Legislative Committee on Prison Reform and as a delegate to the Texas Democratic Party convention. He was unsuccessful in a bid for a seat in Congress in 1978 and 1982.

Tillman was interviewed for the book Black Cinema Treasures.

He died of cancer on June 19, 1998 in Houston, at the age of 73.

== Filmography ==
- Love in Syncopation (1947)
- That Man of Mine (1947)
- The Fight Never Ends (1948)
- Harlem Mood (1949), as vocalist

== See also ==
- List of first minority male lawyers and judges in Texas
