= Don Malkames =

Cinematographer and inventor

- Born: Don Malkames; April 7, 1904; Hazleton, Pennsylvania
- Died: November 24, 1986
- Occupation: Cinematographer

Don Malkames (April 7, 1904 – November 24, 1986) was a cinematographer and inventor in the history of motion picture technology.

== Life and work ==
Malkames began his career at age 17 as an assistant cameraman at Hollywood's William Fox Studio. During the 1930s, he worked in the New York area as a director of photography; he was for several years head of the camera department at the Astoria Studios.

Malkames also invented a lenticular motion-picture process, designed a newsreel camera and served as a technical adviser to several film museums across the country.

He was the father of cinematographer Karl Malkames.

He died at 82 in Yonkers, New York.

=== Select features as cinematographer ===
- The Shadow Laughs (1933)
- Victims of Persecution (1933)
- Kol Nidre (1939)
- Paradise in Harlem (1939)
- Motel the Operator (1940)
- Overture to Glory (1940)
- Eli Eli (1940)
- Her Second Mother (1940)
- The Jewish Melody (1940)
- The Great Advisor (1940)
- The Music Master (Le Père Chopin) (1945)
- That Man of Mine (1946)
- Beware (1946)
- Hi-De-Ho (1947)
- Citizen Saint (1947)
- Reet, Petite, and Gone (1947)
- Junction 88 (1947)
- Miracle in Harlem (1948)
- Jigsaw (1949)
- Project X (1949)
- Sarumba (1950)
- Cry Murder (1950)
- So Young So Bad (1950)
- St. Benny the Dip (1951)
- That Man from Tangier (1953)
- Basin Street Revue (1956)
- The Burglar (1957)
- Terror in the City (1964)
