= Souls of Sin =

1949 American film

- Collage-style "window card" poster for the original theatrical release
- Directed by: Powell Lindsay
- Written by: Powell Lindsay
- Produced by: William D. Alexander
- Starring: Savannah Churchill; Jimmy Wright; Billie Allen
- Cinematography: Louis Andres
- Edited by: Walter Kruder
- Production company: Alexander Productions
- Release date: January 1949
- Running time: 64 minutes
- Country: United States
- Language: English

Souls of Sin is a 1949 American race film written and directed by Powell Lindsay, and produced by William D. Alexander.

Generally regarded as the last race film (all-black film of the pre-Civil Rights era) with either a Black director or producer, Souls of Sin has been described as a landmark film of the genre. The film was producer Alexander's final feature before his move to London, where he began making documentaries (he produced one further film, The Klansman, in the 1970s).

== Plot ==
Dollar Bill Burton, a gambler, lives in a Harlem basement apartment with Roberts, a hard-luck writer, and Alabama, a talented guitarist-singer. At a local bar, Bill is hired by Bad Boy George to sell stolen jewelry and takes an interest in Regina, George's girlfriend who helps Alabama get a break in television. Bill dies of gunshot wounds, but the other characters realize personal success.

— Southern Methodist University Libraries

== Cast ==
- Savannah Churchill as Regina
- Powell Lindsay as Bad Boy George
- William Greaves as Isaiah "Alabama" Lee
- Jimmy Wright as Dollar Bill
- Emery Richardson as Roberts
- Billie Allen as Etta
- Louise Jackson as Mrs. Sands
- Charley Macrae as Mac

== Music ==
Songs featured in the film include:

- "The Things You Do to Me" – Savannah Churchill and Henry Glover
- "Disappointment Blues” – William Greaves
- “Lonesome Blues” – William Greaves

== Release ==
Souls of Sin screened at the 1989 Galveston Film Festival.
