= Rhythm in a Riff =

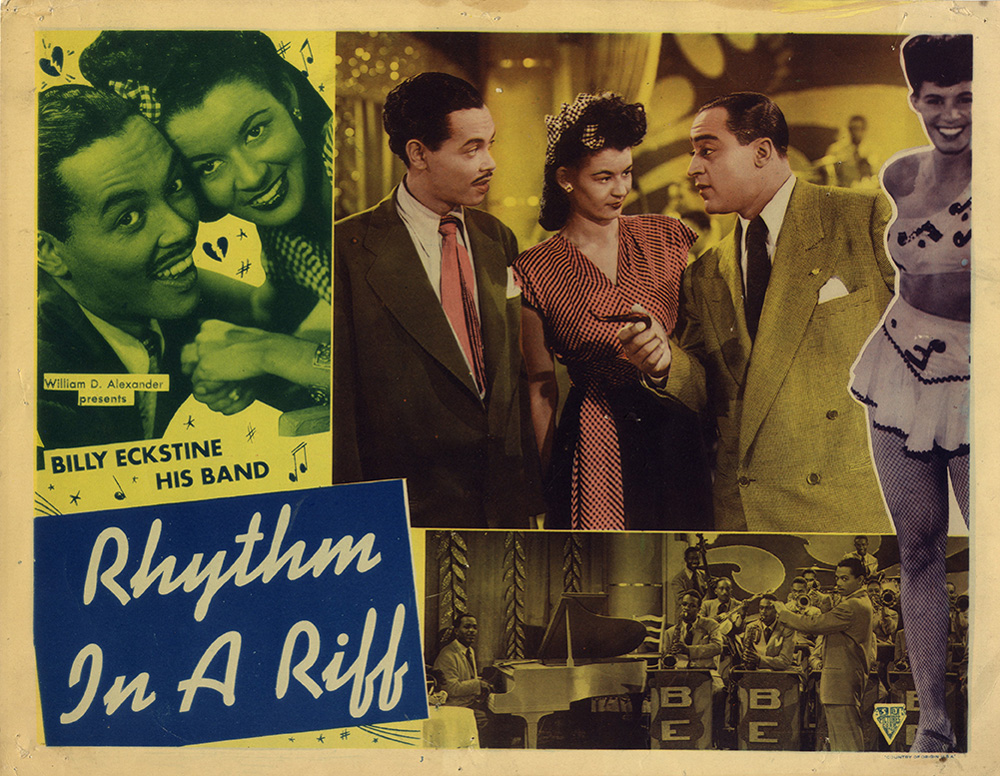
- Lobby card
- Directed by: Leonard Anderson
- Produced by: William D. Alexander
- Starring: Billy Eckstine
- Music by: Billy Eckstine
- Distributed by: Astor Pictures
- Release date: 1947
- Country: United States
- Language: English

Rhythm in a Riff is a 1947 musical film produced by William D. Alexander and directed by Leonard Anderson. The film stars Billy Eckstine and his orchestra, as well as Ann Baker, Hortense Allen Jordan, Sarah Harris, and Emmett "Babe" Wallace, released by Astor Pictures. The film is also known as Flicker Up.

The film features various songs performed by Eckstine, who served as the film's protagonist. He performs as a solo act in the film, singing and conducting various songs such as "Lonesome Lover Blues". Several soundies were made from excerpts of the film.

A September 1949 review in the Indianapolis Recorder described the film as "jampacked full of music, pep, and vitality" and praised Eckstine's acting performance as a bandleader in search of a gig.

Hortense Allen dances in the film. She was shown footage of her performance in the film 50 years after it was made. The dancer, choreographer, costume designer, and producer said it was the first time she ever saw herself dance.

Oakton Community College has a poster for the film. The film was re-released on video in 1993 along with some footage of Dizzy Gillespie under the title Dizzy Gillespie/Billy Eckstine: Things To Come (Vintage Jazz Classics Video VJC-2006). Clips from the film were used in the 2004 Storyville Films release The Black Big Bands.

== Cast ==
- Billy Eckstine - Billy Martin
- Emmett "Babe" Wallace - Joe Corwin
- Sarah Harris - Helen
- Garfield Love - self
- Ray Moore - self
- Ann Baker - self
- Hortense Allen - self
