= The Highest Tradition =

1946 film by William D. Alexander

The Highest Tradition is a 1946 documentary film from the U.S. about African American war heroes. It was written and produced by William D. Alexander. It is a World War II era war propaganda film. Fredric March narrates. The film begins with stock footage of the Pearl Harbor it then transitions into profiles of African American war heroes.

Astor Pictures released the 2-reel film in 1946. The film is extant and available online.
