= Robert A. Junell =

American judge (1947–2025)

Robert Alan Junell

Senior Judge of the United States District Court for the Western District of Texas
- In office February 13, 2015 – November 1, 2025

Judge of the United States District Court for the Western District of Texas
- In office February 12, 2003 – February 13, 2015
- Appointed by: George W. Bush
- Preceded by: Hipolito Frank Garcia
- Succeeded by: David Counts

Member of the Texas House of Representatives
- In office January 10, 1989 – January 14, 2003

Personal details
- Born: Robert Alan Junell; January 27, 1947 El Paso, Texas, U.S.
- Died: November 1, 2025 (aged 78) Midland, Texas, U.S.
- Party: Democratic
- Education: New Mexico Military Institute (AA); Texas Tech University (BS, JD); University of Arkansas (MS)

Robert Alan Junell (January 27, 1947 – November 1, 2025) was an American jurist and politician who served as a judge of the United States District Court for the Western District of Texas.

== Life and career ==
Junell was born in El Paso, Texas. He received an Associate of Arts degree from New Mexico Military Institute in 1967, a Bachelor of Science degree from Texas Tech University in 1969. While at Texas Tech, Junell was a linebacker for the Texas Tech Red Raider football team. Upon graduation, he joined the United States Army and served in Germany, achieving the rank of captain. He remained in the army from 1970 to 1973. Upon discharge from active duty, he obtained a Master of Science degree from the University of Arkansas in 1974 and a Juris Doctor from Texas Tech University School of Law in 1976. He was in private practice in Texas from 1977 to 2003. Junell was elected to the Texas House of Representative for seven terms and served as chairman of the House Appropriations Committee.

=== Federal judicial service ===
On January 7, 2003, Junell was nominated by President George W. Bush to a seat on the United States District Court for the Western District of Texas that had been vacated by Hipolito Frank Garcia. Junell was confirmed by the United States Senate on February 10, 2003, and received his commission on February 12, 2003. He assumed senior status on February 13, 2015, remaining in that position until his death on November 1, 2025.

=== Death ===
Junell died in Midland, Texas on November 1, 2025.

Legal offices
Preceded by Hipolito Frank Garcia	Judge of the United States District Court for the Western District of Texas; 2003–2015	Succeeded by David Counts
