= Hipolito Frank Garcia =

American judge

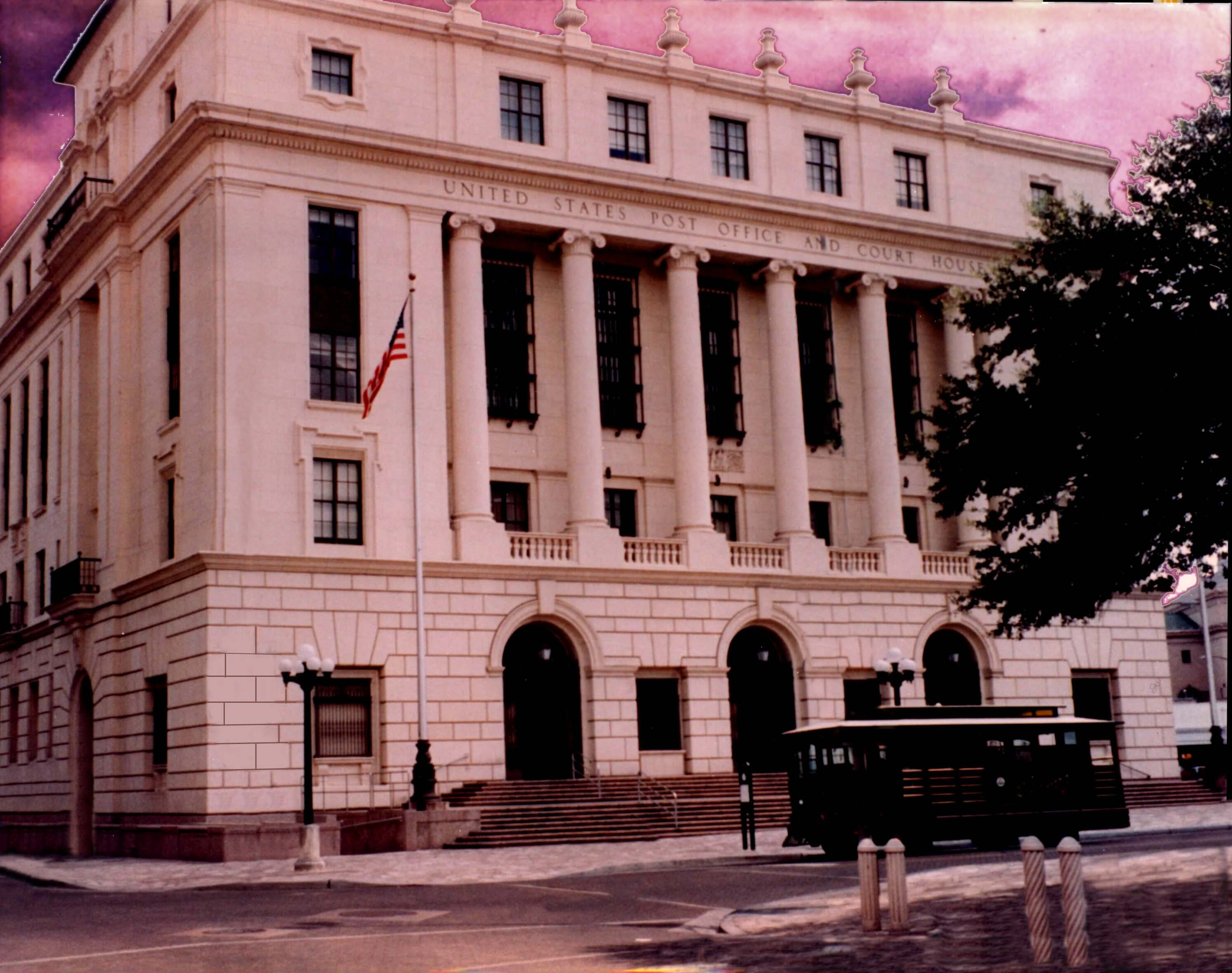
- The Hipolito F. Garcia Federal Building and United States Courthouse in Downtown San Antonio.

Judge of the United States District Court for the Western District of Texas
- In office September 30, 1980 – January 16, 2002
- Appointed by: Jimmy Carter
- Preceded by: Seat established by 92 Stat. 1629
- Succeeded by: Robert A. Junell

Personal details
- Born: Hipolito Frank Garcia; December 4, 1925 San Antonio, Texas
- Died: January 16, 2002 (aged 76) Austin, Texas
- Education: St. Mary's University School of Law (LLB)

Hipolito Frank Garcia (December 4, 1925 – January 16, 2002) was a United States district judge of the United States District Court for the Western District of Texas.

== Education and career ==
Garcia was born in San Antonio, Texas and graduated from Brackenridge High School in 1943. He enlisted in the United States Army during World War II from 1943 to 1946 and was a tank driver. He received a Bachelor of Laws from St. Mary's University School of Law in 1951. He was a deputy district clerk for Bexar County, Texas from 1950 to 1952, and then an assistant criminal attorney for the county 1952 to 1963. He was in private practice from 1963 to 1964, becoming a judge of the Bexar County Law Court from 1964 to 1974, and of the 144th Judicial District Court of Bexar County from 1975 to 1980.

== Federal judicial service ==
On December 19, 1979, Garcia was nominated by President Jimmy Carter to a new seat on the United States District Court for the Western District of Texas created by 92 Stat. 1629. He was confirmed by the United States Senate on September 29, 1980, and received his commission the following day. He served until his death, in Austin, Texas, on January 16, 2002.

== Honor ==
In 2004, the Hipolito F. Garcia Federal Building and United States Courthouse in Downtown San Antonio was named in his honor.

== See also ==
- List of Hispanic and Latino American jurists
- List of first minority male lawyers and judges in Texas

== Sources ==
Legal offices
Preceded by Seat established by 92 Stat. 1629	Judge of the United States District Court for the Western District of Texas; 1980–2002	Succeeded by Robert A. Junell
