= The Vanities =

Short film

The Vanities is a short 10 minute 1946 film directed by William D. Alexander in the United States. Southern Methodist University has the film in its G. William Jones Collection and it has been shown at the Museum of Modern Art (MoMA) in New York City. Charles Keith performs an impersonation of Bette Davis from the 1940 film The Letter and introduces the other acts.

== Cast ==
- Joesfred Portee, singing “I Love My Daddy But I’ve Got to Have My Fun”
- Charles Keith
- Audrey Armstrong, dancing
