= That Man of Mine =

1946 film

- Directed by: Leonard Anderson
- Written by: Powell Lindsey; Les Hafner
- Produced by: William Alexander
- Cinematography: Don Malkames
- Edited by: Theo. H. Markovic
- Release date: 1946 (United States)
- Running time: 56 minutes
- Country: United States
- Language: English

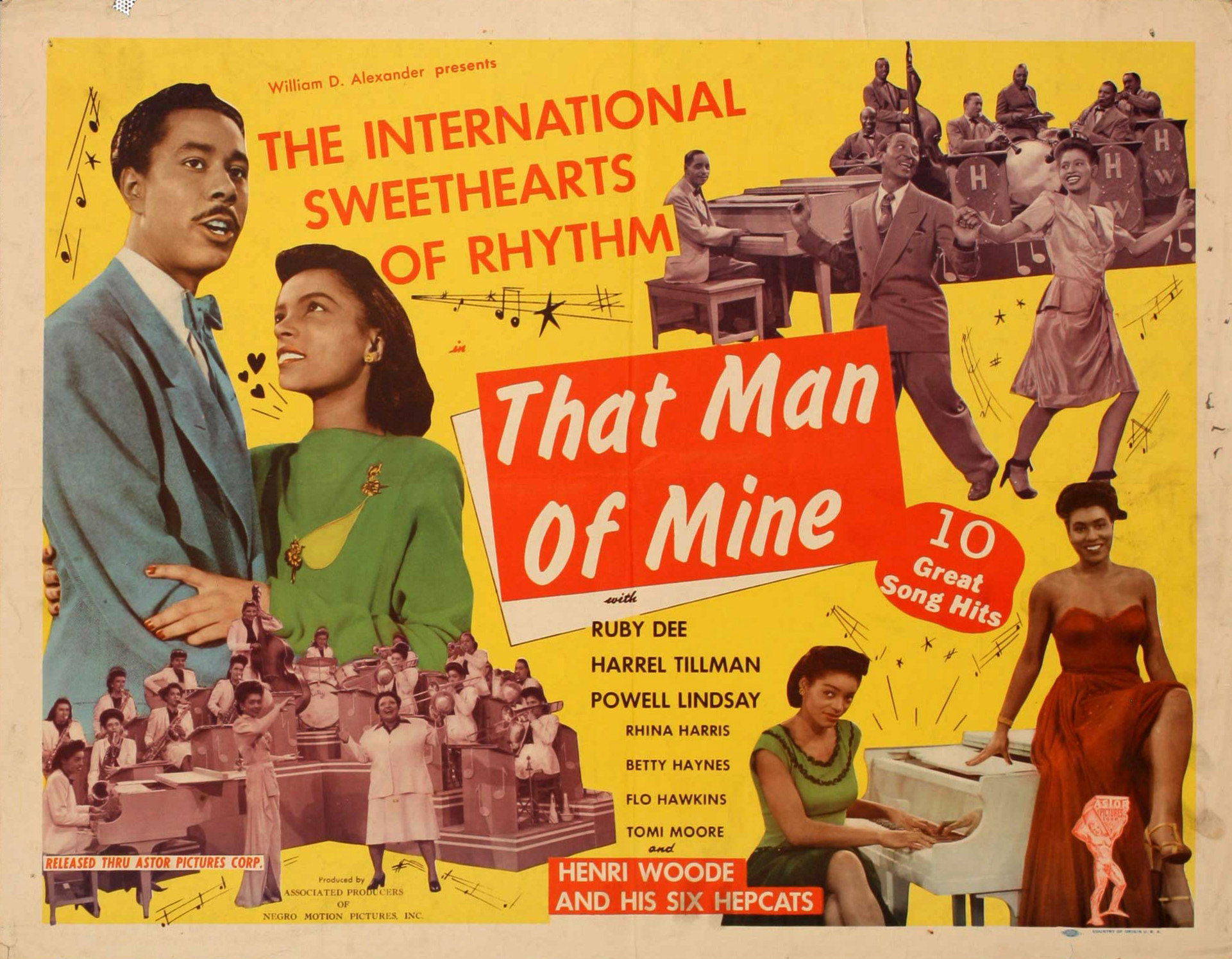
Lobby card

That Man of Mine is an American film released in 1946. Directed by Leonard Anderson, it features an African-American cast.

According to the New York Times, the all female group The International Sweethearts of Rhythm features in "several" soundies that were "culled" from the film.

== Cast ==
- Ruby Dee as Joan
- Harrel Tillman
- Powell Lindsay as Sid
- Tommie Moore as Honey Diamond (previously known as Jenny)
- Flo Hawkins as Nicky
- Rhina Harris
- Berty Haynes
- Ruth Dubois
- Kenneth Broomes as Dancer
- Billie and Millie as Dancers
- The International Sweethearts of Rhythm
- Anna Mae Winburn
- Henri Woode

== Music ==
Several songs are included in the film: "Breaking My Heart" by Joe Liggins, "How About That Jive" by Tiny Davis, "Jam Session", "Don't Get It Twisted", "Vi Vigor", "The Thing", "Standing Room Only", "That Man of Mine" by Maurice King (musician), "Woode Would" by Bob MacRae, "It's Just Like That", "Dear One" by Henri Woode, Marion Marlowe.

== See also ==
- Race film
