= Hipolito F. Garcia Federal Building and United States Courthouse =

- San Antonio US Post Office and Courthouse
- U.S. National Register of Historic Places
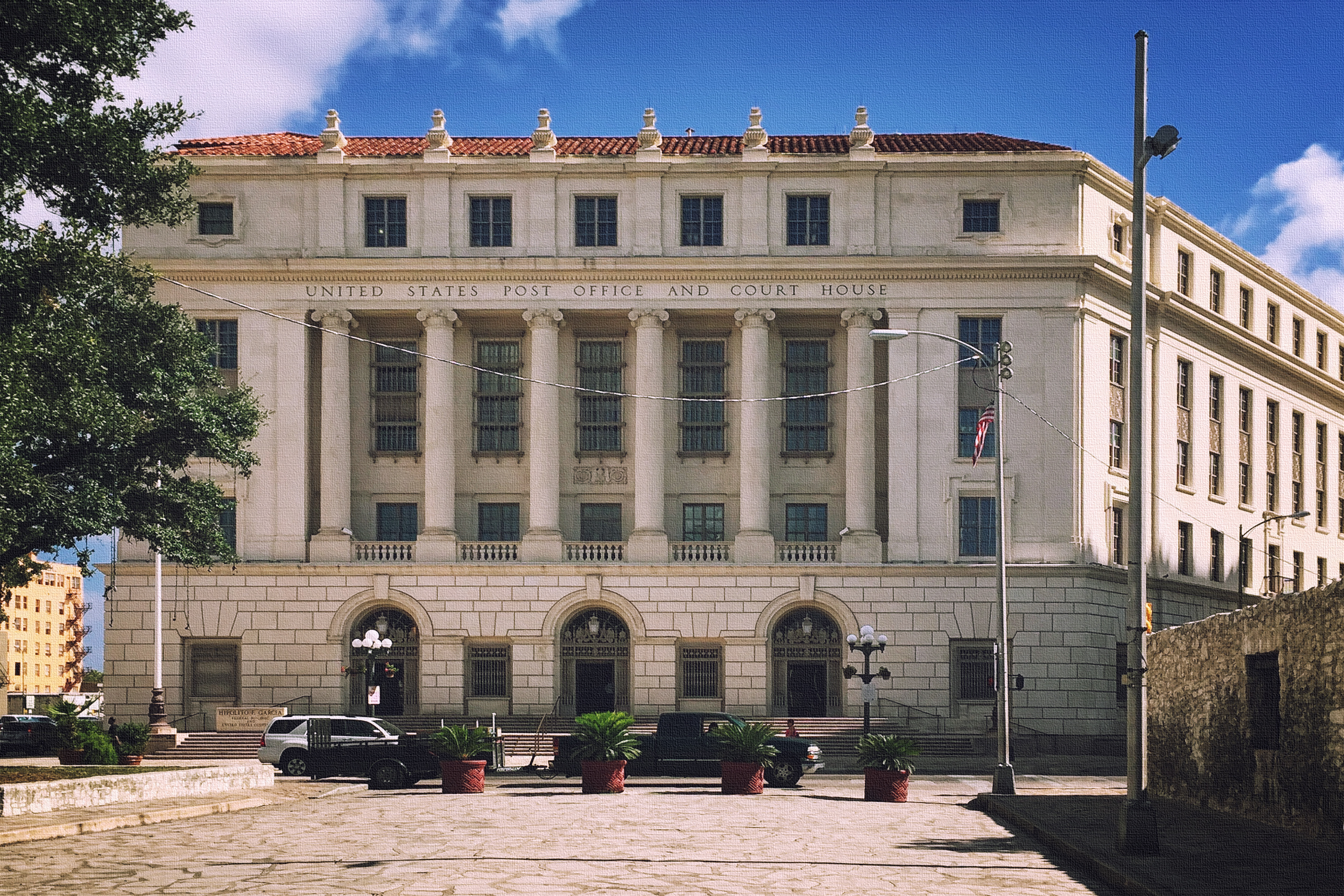
- Hipolito F. Garcia Federal Building and United States Courthouse, August 2003

- Location within Texas Location within the United States
- Location: 615 E. Houston St. San Antonio, Texas; United States
- Coordinates: 29°25′37″N 98°29′10″W
- Area: 1.4 acres (0.57 ha)
- Built: 1937
- Architects: Simon, Louis A.; et al.
- Architectural style: Beaux Arts
- NRHP reference No.: 00001174
- Added to NRHP: September 29, 2000

The Hipolito F. Garcia Federal Building and United States Courthouse is a historic courthouse, federal office, and post office building located in Downtown San Antonio in Bexar County in the U.S. state of Texas. It was formerly the U.S. Post Office, Federal Office Building and Courthouse. It is the courthouse for the United States Bankruptcy Court for the Western District of Texas. It holds a prominent location on Alamo Plaza, across from the Alamo. The building is listed on the National Register of Historic Places as San Antonio U.S. Post Office and Courthouse.

== Building history ==
The building was a product of the Federal Public Works programs enacted to relieve widespread unemployment during the Great Depression of the 1930s. Its construction accomplished several goals—generating employment, housing all federal agencies in a single building, and streamlining San Antonio's quickly expanding postal needs.

Prominent local architect Ralph Haywood Cameron (1892–1970) designed the building in association with renowned Philadelphia architect Paul Philippe Cret under the direction of the Office of the Supervising Architect of the U.S. Treasury Department. Both Cameron and Cret studied at the prestigious École des Beaux-Arts in Paris. Cameron, a native Texan who also designed the Dewitt County Courthouse, went on to become one of the leading Beaux-Arts architects of south Texas, and Cret was nationally recognized as one of the foremost practitioners of the style. A ceremonial cornerstone was laid for the new federal building in 1935. Construction was completed in 1936, and the building officially opened in 1937. At that time, the first floor and basement were air-conditioned, a new technology that had not been installed in the any other post office in the country.

Shortly after the building's completion, noted artist Howard Cook painted an epic 16-panel fresco mural in the entry lobby; it is regarded as one of the showpieces of the federal mural program. Cook was selected from among 185 artists in a national competition conducted by the Treasury Department's Section of Fine Arts. In 1999, art conservators restored the mural to its original brilliance.

The U.S. Post Office and Courthouse is located in the Alamo Plaza Historic District. In 2000, the building was individually listed in the National Register of Historic Places. It was renamed the Hipolito F. Garcia Federal Building and United States Courthouse in 2004 to honor Judge Hipolito Frank Garcia (1925–2002).

== Architecture ==
A skillful example of Beaux-Arts classicism, the U.S. Post Office and Courthouse is indicative of the federal government's goal of expressing democratic ideals through classically derived architecture featuring grand scale, symmetry, and refined details. The six-story building encompasses an entire city block and is constructed of steel and concrete clad in rich local materials—Texas Pink granite and Texas Cream limestone. The building is polygonal in plan, centered on a central light court. Its facade (south elevation) emphasizes a centrally recessed porch behind a screen of six monumental Ionic columns, rising to support an entablature that continues all around the building.

At the first story, the principal approach is created by broad steps of Texas Pink granite spanning the width of the building, leading to three arched entrances with keystones, alternating with four rectangular windows with decorative metal grilles. Limestone masonry walls are articulated by chamfered joints, rising to an overhanging stringcourse. The limestone walls of the upper stories are smooth in contrast, but are also divided into seven bays, featuring rectangular windows at the second story, and elongated fenestration formed by vertically stacked windows at the third and fourth stories. Above the entablature, the attic (sixth) story is similarly clad in smooth limestone veneer with rectangular fenestration flanked by flat pilasters. At the edge of the low-pitched mansard roof, six decorative stone acroteria (urn-like ornaments) are aligned with the pilasters and columns below.

On the interior, the Beaux-Arts tradition of grand entrances and circulation areas is boldly expressed by the entry and postal lobbies' rich architectural detail and ornamentation. The entry lobby is distinguished by a series of bracketed entryways capped by blind arches with egg-and-dart moldings. Light-colored St. Genevieve marble covers the walls up to the springing course. The most vibrant feature is Howard Cook's outstanding 16-panel mural, "San Antonio's Importance in Texas History." The mural is a fresco, a technique of paint applied directly over wet plaster, and spans 750 square feet (70 m^{2}), making it one of the largest frescoes in the nation. Cook's mural evokes historical events in Texas, including the arrival of the first Conquistadors, the signing of the Texas Declaration of Independence, and the arrival of the railroad.

The postal lobby features its original bronze and glass-topped tables, with 41 bronze sales window-boxes capped by a continuous band of fretwork and divided by marble Doric pilasters that rise to a wide dentiled cornice. The floors are Tennessee Golden Veined Pink marble, with dark cedar-colored marble bases, and light-colored St. Genevieve marble for the wainscot. Original bronze light fixtures grace the lobby in a variety of decorative motifs depicting eagles and shields.

The ceremonial courtroom, located in the south wing of the third floor, is a light-filled two-story space, featuring six bronze pendant chandeliers and dark-stained wood for the wainscot and all of the built-in furniture, including the original judge's bench, witness stand and clerk's desk. Tall, painted pilasters extend from the wainscot to a wide ornamental plaster entablature. The judge's bench is framed by an arched niche enriched with wide, intricately decorated plaster ornament, moldings, and gilding, contributing to the impressive character of the room.

The U.S. Post Office and Courthouse retains its character-defining details and craftsmanship, and continues to convey its significance as an excellent example of a monumental Beaux-Arts-style public building in San Antonio.

== Artwork ==
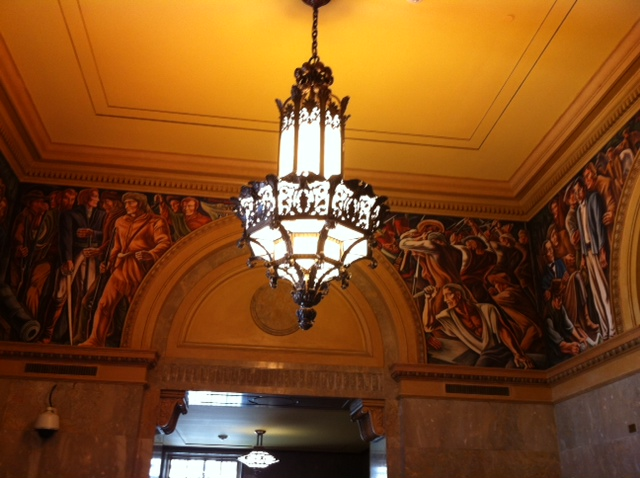
The northern end of Howard Cook's fresco "San Antonio's Importance in Texas History."

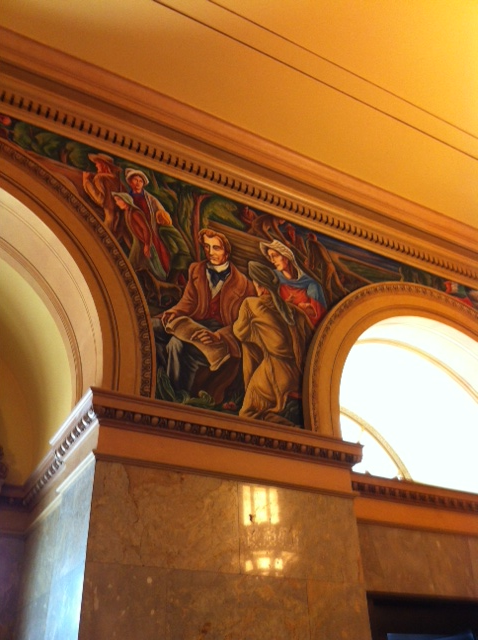
One panel on the south end of the fresco.

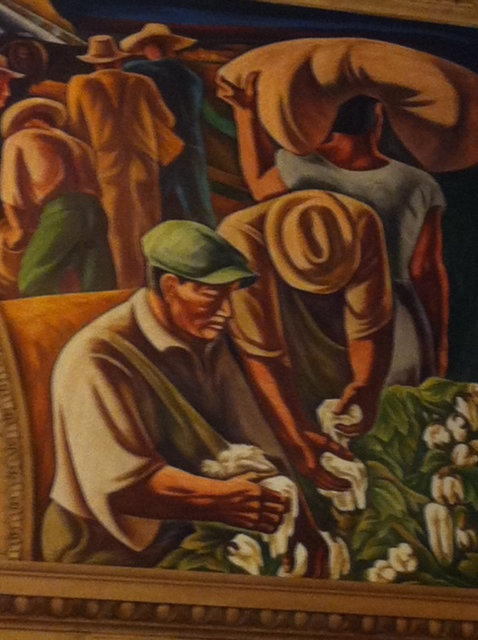
Detail of east end of the fresco.

In 1937, New Mexican artist Howard Cook won a national mural competition sponsored by the Treasury Department's Fine Arts Section to paint a 750 square foot fresco in the lobby of the Federal Building.

"San Antonio's Importance in Texas History" was completed in May 1939 at a cost of $12,000. The 16 frieze panels depict the history of San Antonio.

The southern wall depicts the exploration and initial settlement of the area. On the left, Spanish conquistadors follow Native American guides. In the neighboring image, Franciscan friars oversee Native American slaves in the construction of the missions. The third image depicts trade in San Antonio Plaza with Canary Island settlers. To the right, townspeople celebrate Mexico's independence from Spain and the arrival of Mexican soldiers. Next to that image, pioneers led by Stephen F. Austin encounter indigenous communities. At the far right of the southern wall, Ben Milam dies in the arms of Samuel Maverick after capturing San Antonio.

The western wall includes scenes from the Battle of the Alamo. At left, William Travis—flanked by James Bowie on the left and David Crockett on the right—draws a line in the dirt in an appeal for volunteers to defend the fort. To the right, Mexican soldiers lay siege to the Alamo.

The northern wall begins at left with a scene from the Battle of San Jacinto. Mexican General Santa Anna stands with Sam Houston. A surgeon tends to Houston's leg with "Deaf" Smith at his side. To the right, the 1st Congress of the Republic of Texas convenes with Houston turning over his sword and assuming the role of President. Ministers of Houston's first cabinet are pictured, including Austin, David Burnett, Lorenzo de Zavala, Mirabeau Lamar, Thomas Rusk, Juan Seguin, Smith, and William Wharton. The neighboring panel depicts tensions between settlers and the Comanche. In a scene from the Council House Fight, tribal chiefs return a child hostage while concealing weapons beneath their blankets. Further to the right, the United States flag is raised in a depiction of annexation. This scene is accompanied by images of the land rush and colonization. At the right side of the north wall, the first locomotive arrives in San Antonio and is met by a torchlit procession. Near the corner, a Confederate flag alludes to Texas' involvement in the Civil War.

The eastern wall depicts the development of the Texas economy. Cowboys, vaqueros, cattle, rice and cotton fields, as well as an oil gusher all illustrate the role of natural resources in the growth of the state.

== Significant events ==
- 1932: Congress appropriates funds for the U.S. Post Office and Courthouse.
- 1935-36: The building is constructed.
- 1937: The building is ceremonially opened.
- 1937-39: Howard Cook designs and executes the fresco mural, "San Antonio's Importance in Texas History."
- 1999: Cook's mural is restored.
- 2000: The building is listed in the National Register of Historic Places.
- 2004: Renamed Hipolito F. Garcia Federal Building and United States Courthouse

== Building facts ==
- Architect: Ralph Haywood Cameron and Paul Philippe Cret
- Construction Dates: 1935-36
- Landmark Status: Located in the National Register of Historic Places; listed in the Alamo Plaza National Register Historic District
- Location: 615 East Houston Street, San Antonio, TX 78205
- Architectural Style: Beaux-Arts
- Primary Material: Texas Cream limestone, Texas Pink granite, steel and concrete
- Prominent Features: Howard Cook's 16-panel fresco mural; ceremonial courtroom
