= Vertamae Smart-Grosvenor =

American culinary anthropologist

- Born: April 4, 1937; Fairfax, South Carolina, United States
- Died: September 3, 2016 (aged 79); Bronx, New York, United States
- Occupations: Culinary anthropologist, Actress, Food writer, Broadcaster
- Years active: 1958–2016
- Children: Chandra Weinland Brown; Kali Grosvenor-Henry

Vertamae Smart-Grosvenor (April 4, 1937 – September 3, 2016) was an American culinary anthropologist, griot, poet, food writer, and broadcaster on public media. Born into a Gullah family in the Low Country of South Carolina, she moved with them as a child to Philadelphia during the Great Migration. Later she lived in Paris before settling in New York City. She was active in the Black Arts Movement and performed on Broadway.

Her travels informed her cooking and appreciation of food as culture. She was known for her cookbook-memoir, Vibration Cooking: or, The Travel Notes of a Geechee Girl (1970), and published numerous essays and articles. She produced two award-winning documentaries and was a commentator for years on NPR, serving as a contributor to its NOW series.

Grosvenor also appeared in several films, including Personal Problems (1980), an independent film by Bill Gunn, Daughters of the Dust (1992), about a Gullah family in 1902 during a time of transition on the Sea Islands, and Beloved (1998), based on Toni Morrison's 1987 novel of the same name. She was in a National Geographic documentary about the Gullah people.

== Early life and education ==
Vertamae Smart was born in 1937 as a pre-mature twin; her twin brother died at birth. She was raised in Hampton County, South Carolina, in the Low Country. She grew up speaking Gullah, as her parents' families had been in the area for centuries and were part of that ethnic group and culture. In this area, Africans were concentrated in large populations on relatively isolated Sea Island plantations and in the Low Country; they developed a unique creole culture and language with strong ties to Africa.

Smart grew up on Low Country cuisine. She recounted her paternal grandmother Estella Smart's way with oysters in her first cookbook, published in 1970. Recognizing common practices between contemporary African cooking and that of Low Country African Americans, she became interested in food and cooking as expressions of culture.

When she was about eight, her family moved from the Gullah Geechee Corridor in the Low Country to Philadelphia. She lived there through her teenage years and, as a latchkey kid and an only child, she "had lots of time to experiment with cooking." "I would use up all the food experimenting and she [my mother] would never fuss," writes Grosvenor in Vibration Cooking. "I now realize how uptight it must have put her cause we were so poor and every bit of food counted."

== Early career ==
In 1958, at the age of 19, Smart took off for Paris, France, intending to pursue theater in the bohemian circles of Europe. She also traveled to cities in Italy and other European countries. In Paris, she recognized that a Senegalese woman selling food on the street was using techniques she knew from her family and the Low Country cuisine. She began to write about food and cooking as a way of expressing one's culture.

In Paris, she met Bob Grosvenor, whom she later married. After she was told by a friend that there was a store that "sold frozen lion's tails and elephant tails with green peas," one of her hobbies in Paris was looking for "unusual food stores."

In 1968, Grosvenor returned to Paris, where she lived for a period of time with her two children, Kali and Chandra.

She eventually settled in New York City, where she pursued acting, making it to Broadway, where she played Big Pearl in Mandingo. She was attracted to the Black Arts Movement and its artists, including Nikki Giovanni and Leroi Jones, both of whom she refers to in Vibration Cooking. She became personally involved in the movement. For three years, she was a chanter, dancer, costume designer, member, and often cook of Sun Ra's Solar-Myth Arkestra.

=== Broadcasting ===
Grosvenor was a long-time contributor to public broadcasting in the United States. She was a commentator on NPR's All Things Considered and a regular contributor to NPR's Cultural Desk. Early notable programs were her documentaries Slave Voices: Things Past Telling (1983), and Daufuskie: Never Enough Too Soon, which earned her a Robert F. Kennedy Award and an Ohio State Award.

From 1988 to 1995, she was the host of NPR's documentary series Horizons. Her work there included AIDS and Black America: Breaking the Silence on the AIDS crisis in the United States, which won two awards, a duPont-Columbia Award and an Ohio State Award, in 1990. She also produced a program on connections between indigenous people of South Africa and African Americans, South Africa and the African-American Experience.

She was the host of the radio shows Seasonings, a series of holiday specials on food, cooking, and culture, which won a James Beard Award in 1996 for Best Radio Show; and The Americas' Family Kitchen on PBS, which led to a television spinoff called Vertamae Cooks.

=== Writing ===
Grosvenor is the author of several books on African-American cooking, but is perhaps most famous for Vibration Cooking: or, the Travel Notes of a Geechee Girl (1970), an autobiographical cookbook and memoir. Grosvenor's Thursdays and Every Other Sunday Off: A Domestic Rap (1972), about the experiences and lives of domestic workers, was published by Doubleday as a work of sociology.

In addition to books, she has been a contributing editor to Élan and Essence magazines. She has published articles in the Village Voice, The New York Times, and The Washington Post.

She has published under multiple names, including Vertamae Smart-Grosvenor, Verta Smart, and Vertamae Grosvenor.

=== Vibration Cooking: or, the Travel Notes of a Geechee Girl ===
Vibration Cooking: or, the Travel Notes of a Geechee Girl, published 1970 and reprinted in 1986, 1992, and 2011, is Grosvenor's first book. Through her prose and her recipes, she writes of her travels, her experiences as a black woman in America (especially New York City) and abroad, and her life as influenced and shaped by food. Grosvenor preaches food's ability to nourish, to connect people, to cross regional boundaries, to feel like home, to be a mode of self-expression, to be improvisational and adaptational, and to tell stories. The title, Vibration Cooking, comes from Grosvenor's discussion of "vibrations" in the book. When she cooks, she writes in the book's first chapter, "I just do it by vibration. Different strokes for different folks. Do your thing your way." "Vibrations," for Grosvenor, are not only intuition and using all of one's senses when cooking, but also the energy and attitude one brings when cooking or eating. "Some people got such bad vibrations that to eat with them would give you indigestion," she writes.

The book is written as a mix of narrative and recipes. The line between them is often fuzzy, with recipes composed conversationally and usually without exact measurements. Recipes occur as part of and contribute to the storytelling, with prose continuing after the recipe. Grosvenor encourages the reader to tap into their own sense of vibrations; to "make do"; and to note when the recipe they're cooking looks "right," "done," or "weird"; and to make various adjustments "if you want to." Grosvenor's style of writing and attitude towards food influenced the writer and poet Ntozake Shange when she was writing her own cookbook, if i can cook /you know god can, for which Grosvenor wrote the introduction. The recipes are often introduced via an instance in which that particular meal was eaten, or via a person who gave Grosvenor the recipe. In addition to recipes for food, Grosvenor also includes recipes and guidance for cocktails and other drinks, herbal teas, use of spices and herbs, and poultices and home remedies. The recipes pay homage to Grosvenor's own cultural roots in Geechee (or Gullah) culture and Lowcountry cuisine.

Her intention was both a creative project and to debunk and demystify perceptions of African-American food: "I wanted to tell stories about the gatherings, the people, the food, and the history of the food. For decades the history of African-American food was mucked up. "Soul food," aka black folks' eats, was said to have developed out of master's leftovers ... Education is the key." Grosvenor writes often of soul food in Vibration Cooking, but is careful not to limit what she means by the term; she ties it in the good vibrations with which she cooks herself.

She writes:

People up here [in the North] act like it's going to a lot of trouble just to give you a glass of water and whenever those vibrations hit me, I remember how Aunt Carrie, with no electricity, no running water, no gas, no refrigerator, not even an icebox got us a beautiful supper with love. I know that northern folks are out to lunch and better go down south and get their soul card punched".

She is careful to note that soul food is not racial: "To call it 'soul food'—it's how you could put your soul in the pot... You can't just say food that's been cooked by black hands. Black hands have been cooking food for centuries."

She does not consider herself a soul food writer. In the introduction to the book's 1986 edition, Grosvenor writes:

My feeling was/is any Veau à la Flamande or Blinchishe's Tvorogom I prepared was as 'soulful' as a pair of candied yams. I don't have culinary limitations because I'm 'black.' On the other hand, I choose to write about 'Afro-American' cookery because I'm 'black' and know the wonderful, fascinating culinary history there is. And because the Afro-American cook has been so underappreciated."

The book addresses gentrification of cuisine and the classification as "gourmet" of foods that have long been a part of African-American cookery, such as collards and terrapins. In the recipe for terrapins, Grosvenor writes,

Ain't nothing but swamp turtles. They used to be plentiful on the eastern seaboard. So plentiful that plantation owners gave them to their slaves. Now they are the rare discovery of so-called gore-mays. White folks always discovering something…after we give it up. By the time they got to the bugaloo, we were doing the 'tighten up.' By the time they got to pigs' feet, black people were giving up swine.

Grosvenor uses food as a way to talk about racism and cultural sensitivities. She writes about her own experiences of being discriminated against as a black woman and her frustrations with the oversimplification and pigeonholing of African-American cooking. She includes a letter she once wrote to the editors of Time in response to an essay that claimed soul food to be tasteless: "Your taste buds are so racist that they can't even deal with black food," she wrote.

== Depictions ==
In 2015, filmmaker Julie Dash, known for her film Daughters of the Dust, about Gullah culture in the early 20th century, launched a crowdfunding campaign on Indiegogo to raise money to continue her production of a documentary about Grosvenor entitled Travel Notes of a Geechee Girl.

== Personal life ==
Smart married Bob Grosvenor. They had a daughter, Kali Grosvenor, in 1960, and later separated. Kali Grosvenor-Henry is married and a poet, essayist and author. Grosvenor and Kali published for the first time simultaneously: In 1969, Marie D. Brown, a Doubleday employee received Kali's poetry manuscript and Smart-Grosvenor's cookbook notes and decided to publish both pieces. The following year, in 1970, when Kali was nine, Doubleday published both Poems by Kali and Vibration Cooking.

In 1962, Grosvenor had her daughter Chandra Ursule Weinland-Brown, who is married and an actor, visual artist, and poet. Grosevenor had this child with Oscar Weinland.

=== Death ===
After suffering an aneurysm in 2009, Smart-Growsvenor spent her days in Palm Key, South Carolina, a private island near her birth town. Smart-Grosvenor died of natural causes on September 3, 2016, in the Bronx, NY, at the Hebrew Home at Riverdale.

== Honors and awards ==
- Robert F. Kennedy Award for Daufuskie: Never Enough Too Soon (1990)
- Ohio State Award for Daufuskie: Never Enough Too Soon (1990)
- duPont-Columbia Award for AIDS and Black America: Breaking the Silence (1990)
- National Association of Black Journalists Award for her NPR piece South Africa and the African-American Experience (1990)
- CEBA Award for Marcus Garvey: 20th Century Pan-Africanist (1991)
- James Beard Award for Best Radio Show for Seasonings on NPR (1996)
- Honorary doctorate ("Doctor of Humane Letters") from the University of New Hampshire (1998)
- Craig Claiborne Lifetime Achievement Award from the Southern Foodways Alliance

== Bibliography ==
- Smart-Grosvenor, Vertamae. Vibration Cooking: The Travel Notes of a Geechee Girl. Ballantine Books, 1970.
- Grosvenor, Vertamae, Thursdays and Every Other Sunday Off: A Domestic Rap, New York: Doubleday, 1972
- Grosvenor, Vertamae. Black Atlantic Cooking, Prentice Hall Trade, 1990.
- Grosvenor, Vertamae. Vertamae Cooks in America's Family Kitchen. KQED Books, 1996.
- Grosvenor, Vertamae. Vertamae Cooks Again. Bay Books, 1999.

== See also ==
- Cuisine of the Southern United States
- Hoppin' John
