= William D. Alexander =

American film producer (1916–1991)

- Anna Mae Winburn and Alexander in the 1940s
- Born: William Alexander; August 21, 1916; Denver, Colorado, U.S.
- Died: November 19, 1991 (aged 75); The Bronx, New York City, U.S.
- Years active: 1946-1974

William D. Alexander (1916 – November 19, 1991) was an American filmmaker. He made U.S. government-sponsored newsreels for African American audiences. He later established his own production company, Alexander Productions, in New York City and became a film producer.

He made the short documentary film Village of Hope about a leper colony in Liberia. He also made the films Portrait of Ethiopia Wealth of Wood, which received the United Nations Award at the Madrid International Film Festival in Madrid in 1967.

== Biography ==
Alexander was born in 1916 in Denver, Colorado, or in Missouri. He grew up in Colorado and was educated at Colorado State College of Education, now the University of Northern Colorado, and Chicago State University.

In 1941, Alexander relocated to Washington, D.C., where he was employed by the National Youth Administration. He worked for a radio program, where his responsibilities involved interviewing African Americans who worked for the federal government and producing stories about Washington's Black middle class.

During World War II, Alexander worked for the Office of War Information, producing press releases and newsreels relaying news concerning African-American soldiers and sailors. Alexander and his colleagues produced more than 250 newsreels, which were released under the title All-American News.

In 1945, Alexander relocated to New York City, where he established his own production company, Alexander Productions, and founded the Associated Film Producers of Negro Motion Pictures. Alexander produced musical shorts, such as Jivin' in Bebop (featuring Dizzy Gillespie), Burlesque in Harlem, and Open the Door, Richard (whose theme later became a hit record). He also produced features, including The Fight Never Ends (in which boxer Joe Louis, starring as himself, fought juvenile delinquency), The Highest Tradition, and Rhythm in a Riff (which featured Billy Eckstine). Alexander's Souls of Sin has been described as the last race movie made by a Black producer.

Alexander moved to London in 1950. Over the next 18 years, he produced a series of highly-praised documentaries concerning the new states emerging from colonialism in Africa. Many of these films were produced at the request of the African states, and were used to promote the new states abroad. At different times, Alexander served as the official film-maker for Liberia and Ethiopia. In 1960, the American ABC television network broadcast a twelve-part documentary by Alexander concerning the new African states. The 22 African states where Alexander worked during the 1950s and 1960s awarded him various awards.

One of Alexander's documentaries, The Village of Hope, was about a Liberian leper colony. It was recognized at the 1964 Cannes Film Festival with a Short Film Palme d'Or. Alexander's Portrait of Ethiopia was honored with a prize at the 1965 Venice Film Festival. Wealth in Wood, another of Alexander's documentaries, was given the United Nations Award at the Madrid International Film Festival in 1967.

In 1974, Alexander produced The Klansman, based on the novel by William Bradford Huie. With a budget of US$4.5 million, The Klansman was the biggest production of Alexander's career. It starred O. J. Simpson in his acting debut. Despite its big budget and all-star cast, which included Richard Burton, Lola Falana, and Lee Marvin, The Klansman was Alexander's least successful film. His next film, Jackpot, shut down during production and remains unfinished.

== Death ==
Alexander died of cancer in the Bronx on November 19, 1991. In 1995, he was inducted into the Black Filmmakers Hall of Fame.

== Filmography ==
- The Vanities (1946)
- The Highest Tradition (1946), about African American World War II war heroes
- Love in Syncopation (1946)
- Rhythm in a Riff (1947)
- The Fight Never Ends (1948)
- Souls of Sin (1949)
- Portrait of Ethiopia (1960)
- Village of Hope, a short documentary film about a leper colony in Liberia
- Wealth in Wood
- The Klansman (1974)

== See also ==
- African American cinema
