= Ruby Dee =

American actress (1922–2014)

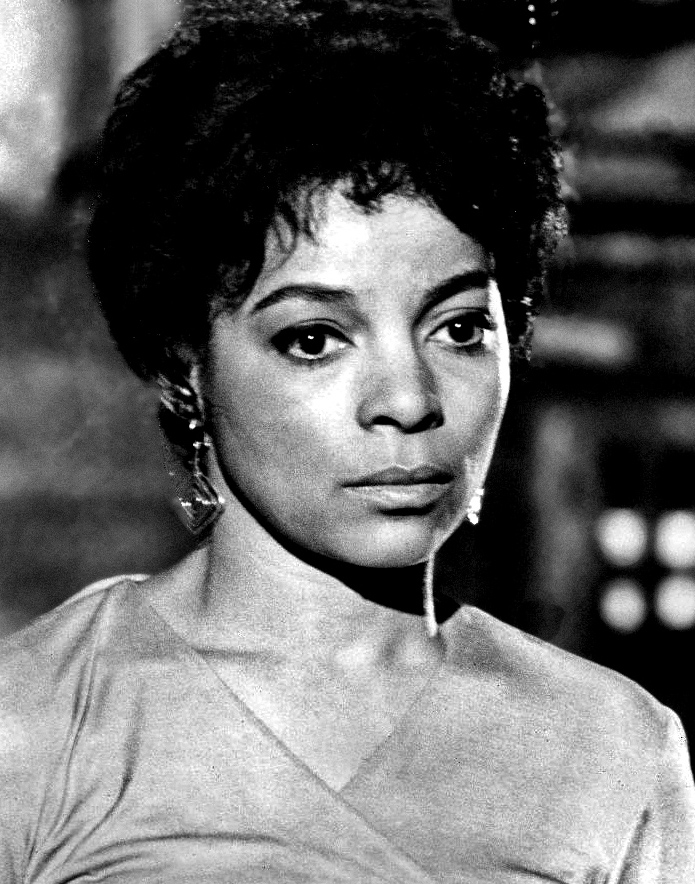
- Dee in 1972
- Born: Ruby Ann Wallace; October 27, 1922; Cleveland, Ohio, U.S.
- Died: June 11, 2014 (aged 91); New Rochelle, New York, U.S.
- Resting place: Ferncliff Cemetery
- Education: Hunter College (1945)
- Occupation: Actress
- Years active: 1940–2013
- Spouses: Frankie Dee Brown (m. 1941; div. 1945) Ossie Davis (m. 1948; died 2005)
- Children: 3, including Guy Davis

Ruby Dee (born Ruby Ann Wallace; October 27, 1922 – June 11, 2014) was an American actress. She was married to Ossie Davis, with whom she frequently performed until his death in 2005. She received numerous accolades, including an Emmy Award, a Grammy Award, an Obie Award, and a Drama Desk Award, as well as a nomination for an Academy Award. She was honored with the National Medal of Arts in 1995, the Screen Actors Guild Life Achievement Award in 2000, and the Kennedy Center Honors in 2004.

Dee started her career with the American Negro Theatre. She met her future husband working together on the play Jeb (1946). She originated the Broadway roles of Ruth Younger in Lorraine Hansberry's A Raisin in the Sun (1959) and reprised the role in the 1961 film and Lutiebell Gussie Mae Jenkins in the Ossie Davis play Purlie Victorious (1961) and reprised the role in the 1963 film.

She made her film debut in That Man of Mine (1946) before landing leading roles in films such as The Jackie Robinson Story (1950), Edge of the City (1957), Take a Giant Step (1959), and Buck and the Preacher (1972). She also acted in the Ossie Davis film Black Girl (1972), and later in the Spike Lee films Do the Right Thing (1989) and Jungle Fever (1991). For her performance in American Gangster (2007), Dee was nominated for the Academy Award for Best Supporting Actress and won the Screen Actors Guild Award for Female Actor in a Supporting Role.

Dee received two Primetime Emmy Award nominations for her roles in The Doctors and the Nurses (1964) and Decoration Day (1990). She was nominated for her other roles in Roots: The Next Generations (1979), Lincoln (1988), China Beach (1990), and Evening Shade (1993). She also acted in I Know Why the Caged Bird Sings (1979), Long Day's Journey into Night (1982), Go Tell It on the Mountain (1985), The Court-Martial of Jackie Robinson (1990), and The Stand (1994). She voiced Alice the Great in the Nick Jr. series Little Bill from 1999 to 2004.

== Early life and education ==
Dee was born Ruby Ann Wallace on October 27, 1922, in Cleveland, Ohio, the daughter of Gladys (née Hightower) and Marshall Edward Nathaniel Wallace, a cook, waiter and porter. After her mother left the family, Dee's father remarried, to Emma Amelia Benson, a schoolteacher.

Dee was raised in Harlem, New York. Prior to attending Hunter College High School, she studied at Public Schools 119 and 136. Then, she went on to graduate from Hunter College with a degree in Romance languages in 1945. She was a member of Delta Sigma Theta.

== Career ==
=== 1940–1959: Early acting roles ===
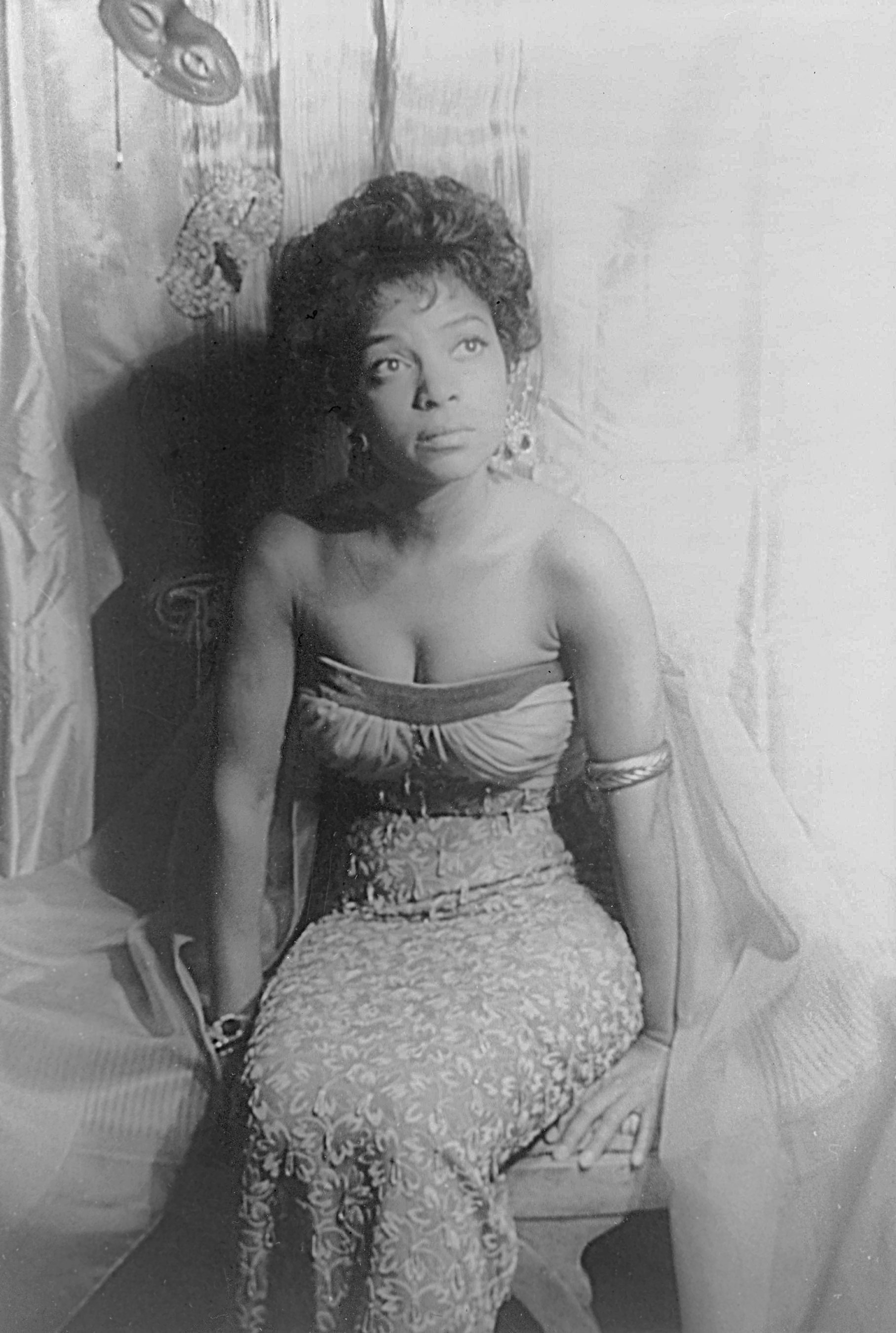
Dee by Carl Van Vechten, September 25, 1962

Dee joined the American Negro Theatre as an apprentice, working with Sidney Poitier, Harry Belafonte, and Hilda Simms. She made her Broadway debut portraying a Native in the play South Pacific (1943). She played the title role in the Eugene O'Neill play Anna Lucasta. She met her future husband Ossie Davis in the post-World War II play Jeb (1946). That same year she was in her first onscreen role in the musical That Man of Mine (1946). The following year she acted in the crime film The Fight Never Ends (1947).

She received national recognition for her portrayal of Rachel Robinson in the sports drama film The Jackie Robinson Story (1950). Bosley Crowther of The New York Times praised Dee's performance describing her as "the well restrained sweetheart". Also in 1950 she had an uncredited role in film noir No Way Out directed by Joseph L. Mankiewicz. She continued acting in films such as the historical crime film The Tall Target (1951), the sports film Go Man Go (1954), the music film St. Louis Blues (1958), and the British drama Virgin Island (1958). During this time she took a role in the film noir Edge of the City (1957) starring alongside John Cassavetes and Sidney Poitier, and in the film Take a Giant Step (1959) starring with Johnny Nash and Estelle Hemsley.

=== 1959–1979: Breakthrough and acclaim ===
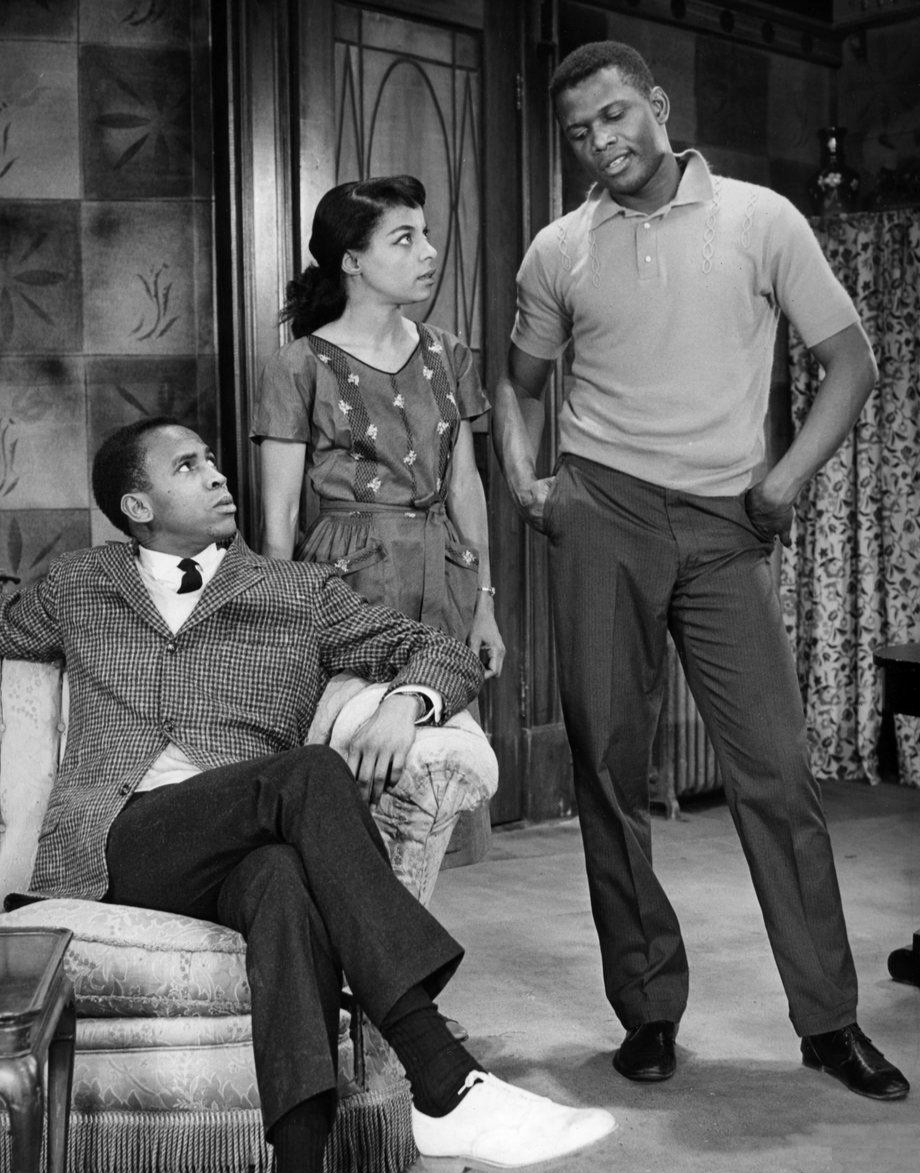
Louis Gossett Jr., Dee and Sidney Poitier in A Raisin in the Sun (1959)

Dee's career in acting crossed all major forms of media over a span of eight decades. In 1959, she gained prominence for originating the role of Ruth Younger, a suffering housewife in the projects, in Lorraine Hansberry's play A Raisin in the Sun, which premiered on Broadway. She acted alongside Sidney Poitier and Louis Gossett Jr. The play was the first play written by a Black woman to be produced on Broadway. She reprised the role opposite Poitier in the 1961 film of the same name. She returned to Broadway in the Ossie Davis satirical farce Purlie Victorious (1961) portraying Lutiebell Gussie Mae Jenkins. Howard Taubman of The New York Times wrote of Dee's performance, "[she] has been treated generously. As Lutiebell she has enough humor and charm to make one envy Purlie Victorious that she is eager disciple". She acted opposite her husband Ossie Davis and Alan Alda in his acting debut. They reprised their roles of the 1963 film entitled Gone Are the Days!, which was produced by Brock Peters and directed by Nicholas Webster.

Her early television appearances included episodes of The Fugitive, The Defenders, and the soap opera Guiding Light. She received the Primetime Emmy Award for Outstanding Lead Actress in a Limited or Anthology Series or Movie for her role on The Doctors and the Nurses (1964). In 1965, Dee performed in lead roles at the American Shakespeare Festival as Kate in The Taming of the Shrew and Cordelia in King Lear, becoming the first black actress to portray a lead role in the festival. In 1963 she acted in the film The Balcony with Shelley Winters, Peter Falk, Lee Grant, and Leonard Nimoy. She then acted in the film noir The Incident (1967), the drama film Uptight (1968), and the documentary King: A Filmed Record... Montgomery to Memphis (1970).

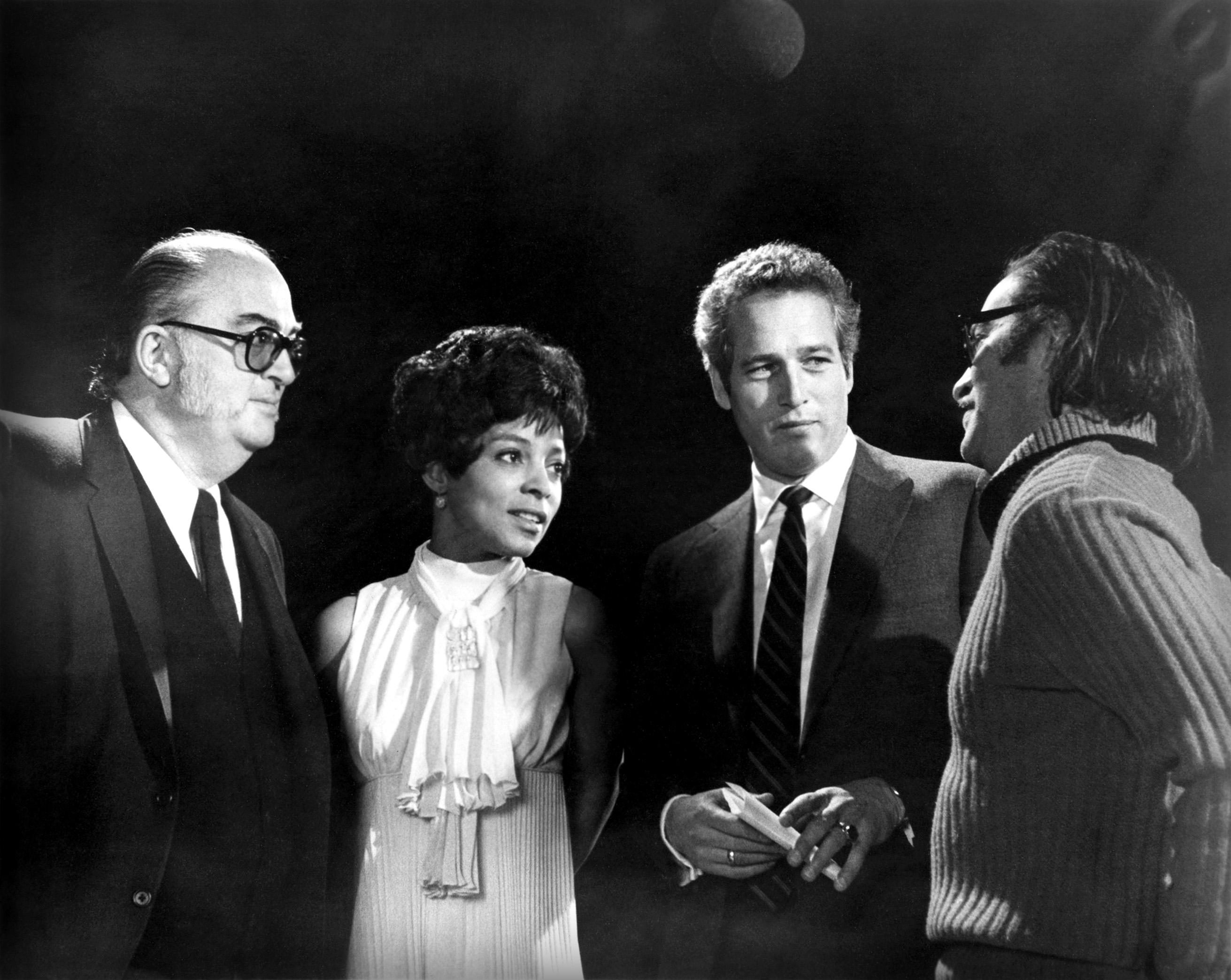
Left to right: Ely Landau, Ruby Dee, Paul Newman, and Sidney Lumet at the King: A Filmed Record (1970)

In 1969, Dee appeared in 20 episodes of Peyton Place. She acted in Ossie Davis' films Black Girl (1972) and Countdown at Kusini (1976) and the Western film Buck and the Preacher (1972) with Sidney Poitier and Harry Belafonte. She appeared as Cora Sanders, a Marxist college professor, in season 1, episode 14 of Police Woman, entitled "Target Black" which aired on Friday night, January 3, 1975. The character of Cora Sanders was obviously, but loosely, influenced by the real-life Angela Davis. She played Queen Haley in the miniseries Roots: The Next Generations (1979) for which she received a nomination for the Primetime Emmy Award for Outstanding Supporting Actress in a Limited or Anthology Series or Movie. She acted in the CBS television film I Know Why the Caged Bird Sings (1979) based on the Maya Angelou autobiography of the same name.

=== 1980–2014 ===
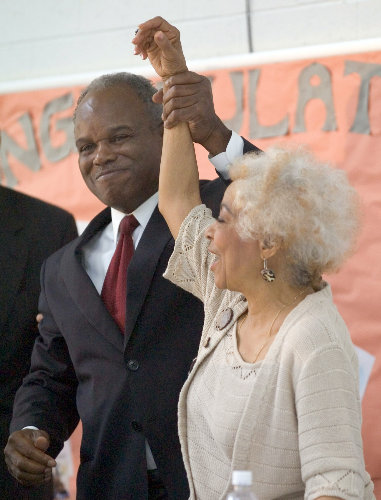
Dee with Congressman David Scott in 2006

Dee starred in the television films portraying Mary Tyrone in Long Day's Journey into Night (1982) and Mrs. Grimes in Go Tell It on the Mountain (1985). She appeared in the 1988 mini-series Lincoln, which gave her a Outstanding Supporting Actress in a Miniseries or a Special nomination for playing Elizabeth Keckley. She appeared in Spike Lee's 1989 film Do the Right Thing, and his 1991 film Jungle Fever.

In 1990, she portrayed Zora Neale Hurston in Zora Is My Name! and played Jackie Robinson's mother in The Court-Martial of Jackie Robinson. That same year, she earned her only Primetime Emmy Award for her role in the TV film Decoration Day (1990). She also guest-starred in The Golden Girls episode "Wham, Bam, Thank You, Mammy", and was nominated for an Emmy Award for her television guest appearance in the China Beach episode "Skylark". Her husband Ossie Davis (1917–2005) also appeared in the episode. She received another Emmy nomination for her appearance in the Evening Shade episode "They Can't Take That Away from Me", a show in which her husband was a regular.

Dee returned to Broadway in the play Checkmates written by Ron Milner. She acted alongside Denzel Washington, Paul Winfield and Marsha Jackson. In 1993, Dee performed at the Crossroads Theater in her own adaptation of Rosa Guy's novel The Disappearance, calling the production not a play but "enhanced story telling". She also appeared in the comedy film Cop and a Half (1993) with Burt Reynolds.

Dee in New York City (2000)

Dee played Mother Abagail Freemantle in the Stephen King miniseries The Stand (1994). In 1995, she and Davis were awarded the National Medal of Arts from President Bill Clinton. She collaborated with comedian Bill Cosby acting in both Cosby in 1999, and voicing Alice the Great in the Nick Jr. animated series Little Bill from 1999 to 2004, which led to two nominations for a Daytime Emmy Award.

In 2003, she narrated a series of WPA & slave narratives in the HBO film Unchained Memories. They were also recipients of the 2004 Kennedy Center Honors. In 2007 the Grammy Award for Best Spoken Word Album was shared by Dee and Ossie Davis for With Ossie and Ruby: In This Life Together, and former President Jimmy Carter. Dee portrayed Mama Lucas in the Ridley Scott directed crime film American Gangster (2007). Dee acted alongside Denzel Washington and Russell Crowe. For her performance she was nominated for the Academy Award for Best Supporting Actress losing to Tilda Swinton for her role in the legal thriller Michael Clayton (2007). She won the Screen Actors Guild Award for Outstanding Actress in a Supporting Role for the same performance. At 85 years of age, Dee is currently the third oldest nominee for Best Supporting Actress, behind Gloria Stuart and Judi Dench (both 87).

On February 12, 2009, Dee joined the Aaron Copland School of Music at Queens College orchestra and chorus, along with the Riverside Inspirational Choir and NYC Labor Choir, in honoring Abraham Lincoln's 200th birthday at the Riverside Church in New York City. Under the direction of Maurice Peress, they performed Earl Robinson's The Lonesome Train: A Music Legend for Actors, Folk Singers, Choirs, and Orchestra, in which Dee was the narrator. Dee's last role in a theatrically released film was in the Eddie Murphy comedy A Thousand Words (2012), in which she portrayed the mother of Murphy's protagonist. In 2013 she narrated the Lifetime film Betty & Coretta starring Angela Bassett and Mary J. Blige. Her final film role is in 1982, which premiered at the 2013 Toronto International Film Festival and was released on home video on March 1, 2016. It is unknown whether her final role will ever be seen, as King Dog was in production at the time of her death, and no release date has ever been announced.

== Personal life ==
=== Marriage ===
Ruby Wallace married blues singer Frankie Dee Brown in 1941, and began using his middle name as her stage name. The couple divorced in 1945. Three years later she married actor Ossie Davis, whom she met while costarring in Robert Ardrey's 1946 Broadway play Jeb. Together, Dee and Davis wrote an autobiography in which they discussed their political activism and their decision to have an open marriage (later changing their views). Together they had three children: son, blues musician Guy Davis, and two daughters, Nora Day and Hasna Muhammad. Dee was a breast cancer survivor of more than three decades. In 1979, the Supersisters trading card set was produced and distributed; one of the cards featured Dee's name and picture.

=== Political activism ===
Dee and Davis were well-known civil rights activists in the Civil Rights Movement. Dee was a member of the Congress of Racial Equality (CORE), the NAACP, the Student Nonviolent Coordinating Committee, Delta Sigma Theta sorority, and the Southern Christian Leadership Conference. She was also as an active member of the Harlem Writers Guild for over 40 years. In 1963, Dee emceed the March on Washington for Jobs and Freedom. Dee and Davis were both personal friends of both Martin Luther King Jr. and Malcolm X, with Davis giving the eulogy at Malcolm X's funeral in 1965. In 1970, she won the Frederick Douglass Award from the New York Urban League. In 1999, Dee and Davis were arrested at 1 Police Plaza, the headquarters of the New York Police Department, protesting the police shooting of Amadou Diallo.

In early 2003, The Nation published "Not in Our Name", an open proclamation vowing opposition to the impending US invasion of Iraq. Ruby Dee and Ossie Davis were among the signatories, along with Robert Altman, Noam Chomsky, Susan Sarandon, and Howard Zinn, among others. In November 2005, Dee was awarded – along with her late husband – the Lifetime Achievement Freedom Award, presented by the National Civil Rights Museum located in Memphis. Dee, a long-time resident of New Rochelle, New York, was inducted into the New Rochelle Walk of Fame which honors the most notable residents from throughout the community's 325-year history. She was also inducted into the Westchester County Women's Hall of Fame on March 30, 2007, joining such other honorees as Hillary Clinton and Nita Lowey. In 2009, she received an honorary Doctor of Fine Arts degree from Princeton University.

=== Death ===
Dee died on June 11, 2014, at her home in New Rochelle, New York, from natural causes at the age of 91. In a statement, Gil Robertson IV of the African-American Film Critics Association said, "the members of the African American Film Critics Association are deeply saddened at the loss of actress and humanitarian Ruby Dee. Throughout her seven-decade career, Dee embraced different creative platforms with her various interpretations of black womanhood and also used her gifts to champion for Human Rights."

"She very peacefully surrendered", said her daughter Nora Day. "We hugged her, we kissed her, we gave her our permission to go. She opened her eyes. She looked at us. She closed her eyes, and she set sail." Following her death, the marquee on the Apollo Theater read: "A TRUE APOLLO LEGEND RUBY DEE 1922–2014".

Dee was cremated, and her ashes are held in the same urn as that of Davis, with the inscription "In this thing together". A public memorial celebration honoring Dee was held on September 20, 2014, at the Riverside Church in Upper Manhattan. Their shared urn was buried at Ferncliff Cemetery in Hartsdale, New York.

== Acting credits ==
=== Filmography ===
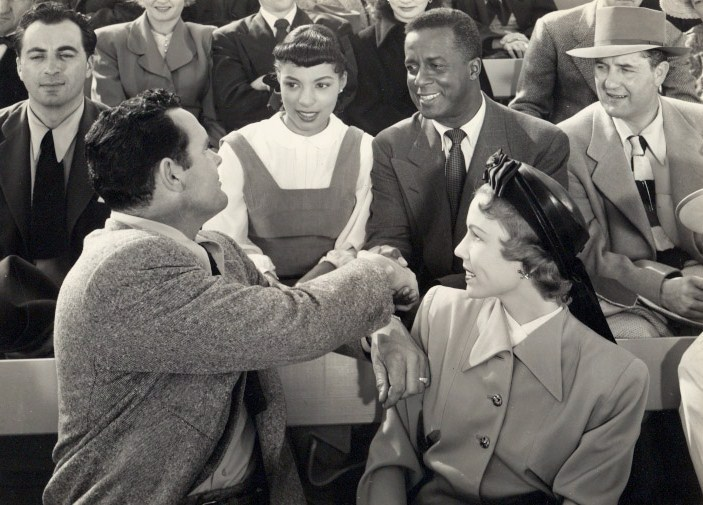
Ruby Dee and Joel Fluellen (center) in The Jackie Robinson Story (1950)

| Year | Title | Role | Note |
|---|---|---|---|
| 1946 | That Man of Mine | Joan | First film |
| 1947 | Easy to Get | Drugstore girl | U.S. Army venereal disease training film |
| 1947 | The Fight Never Ends | Jane | |
| 1948 | What a Guy | | |
| 1950 | The Jackie Robinson Story | Rae Robinson | |
| 1950 | No Way Out | Connie Brooks | Uncredited |
| 1951 | The Tall Target | Rachel | |
| 1954 | Go, Man, Go! | Irma Jackson | |
| 1957 | Edge of the City | Lucy Tyler | |
| 1958 | St. Louis Blues | Elizabeth | |
| 1958 | Virgin Island | Ruth | |
| 1959 | Take a Giant Step | Christine | |
| 1961 | A Raisin in the Sun | Ruth Younger | |
| 1963 | The Balcony | Thief | |
| 1963 | Gone Are the Days! | Lutiebelle Gussie Mae Jenkins | |
| 1967 | The Incident | Joan Robinson | |
| 1968 | Up Tight! | Laurie | |
| 1970 | King: A Filmed Record... Montgomery to Memphis | Herself | Documentary |
| 1972 | Buck and the Preacher | Ruth | |
| 1972 | Black Girl | Netta's Mother | |
| 1973 | Wattstax | Herself | |
| 1975 | Lorraine Hansberry: The Black Experience in the Creation of Drama | Herself | Short |
| 1976 | Countdown at Kusini | Leah Matanzima | |
| 1980 | The Torture of Mothers | | Short |
| 1982 | Cat People | Female | |
| 1989 | Do the Right Thing | Mother Sister | |
| 1990 | Love at Large | Corrine Dart | |
| 1991 | Jungle Fever | Lucinda Purify | |
| 1993 | Color Adjustment | Narrator | Documentary |
| 1993 | Cop and a Half | Rachel | |
| 1995 | Just Cause | Evangeline | |
| 1995 | Tuesday Morning Ride | Jennie | Short |
| 1997 | A Simple Wish | Hortense | |
| 1998 | A Time to Dance: The Life and Work of Norma Canner | Narrator | Documentary |
| 1999 | Baby Geniuses | Margo | |
| 1999 | The Unfinished Journey | Narrator | Short |
| 2003 | Beah: A Black Woman Speaks | Herself | Documentary |
| 2006 | No. 2 | Nanna Maria | |
| 2006 | The Way Back Home | Maude | |
| 2007 | All About Us | Ms. Ella | |
| 2007 | American Gangster | Mama Lucas | |
| 2007 | Steam | Doris | |
| 2009 | The Perfect Age of Rock 'n' Roll | Miss Candy | |
| 2009 | The New Neighbors | Narrator | Short |
| 2010 | Dream Street | Laura | |
| 2011 | Video Girl | Valerie | |
| 2011 | Politics of Love | Grandma 'Estelle' Roseanne Gupta | |
| 2011 | Red & Blue Marbles | Professor June Wright | |
| 2012 | Long Distance Revolutionary: A Journey With Mumia Abu-Jamal | Herself | |
| 2012 | A Thousand Words | Annie McCall | |
| 2013 | 1982 | Rose Brown | Final role |

=== Television ===
| Year | Title | Role | Note |
|---|---|---|---|
| 1960–61 | Play of the Week | Lila / Jane | 2 episodes |
| 1961 | Frontiers of Faith | Grace Gilmore | Episode: "The Bitter Cup" |
| 1962 | Seven Times Monday | Lila | TV movie |
| 1963 | Alcoa Premiere | Irene Clayton | Episode: "Impact of an Execution" |
| 1963 | The Doctors and the Nurses | Jenny Bishop | Episode: "Express Stop from Lenox Avenue" |
| 1963 | The Fugitive | Laura Smith | Episode: "Decision in the Ring" |
| 1963 | The Great Adventure | Harriet Tubman | Episode: "Go Down, Moses" |
| 1963 | East Side West Side | Marilyn Marsden | Episode: "No Hiding Place" |
| 1964 | Of Courtship and Marriage | | TV movie |
| 1965 | The Defenders | Catherine Collins | Episode: "The Sworn Twelve" |
| 1966 | Armchair Theatre | Vicky Kingsbury | Episode: "Neighbours" |
| 1967 | Guiding Light | Martha Frazier | Cast member |
| 1968–69 | Peyton Place | Alma Miles | 25 episodes |
| 1969 | The Bold Ones: The Protectors | Lucinda | Episode: "Deadlock" |
| 1970 | Sesame Street | Herself | |
| 1971 | The Sheriff | Sue Ann Lucas | TV movie |
| 1973 | Tenafly | Jan Lennox | Episode: "The Window That Wasn't" |
| 1974 | It's Good to Be Alive | Ruth Campanella | TV movie |
| 1975 | Police Woman | Cora Sanders | Episode: "Target Black" |
| 1978 | Watch Your Mouth | Mrs. Fullo | Episode: "The Outcast" |
| 1979 | Roots: The Next Generations | Queen Haley | Miniseries |
| 1979 | I Know Why the Caged Bird Sings | Grandmother Baxter | TV movie |
| 1980 | All God's Children | Irene Whitfield | TV movie |
| 1980–82 | With Ossie and Ruby! | Herself | |
| 1982 | Long Day's Journey into Night | Mary Tyrone | TV movie |
| 1985 | Go Tell It on the Mountain | Mrs. Grimes | TV movie |
| 1985 | The Atlanta Child Murders | Faye Williams | Miniseries |
| 1987 | Spenser: For Hire | Eleanor Simpson | Episode: "Personal Demons" |
| 1987 | Crown Dick | Johnson's Mother | TV movie |
| 1988 | Windmills of the Gods | Dorothy | 2 episodes |
| 1988 | Gore Vidal's Lincoln | Elizabeth Keckley | 2 episodes |
| 1990 | Zora Is My Name! | Zora Neale Hurston | TV movie |
| 1990 | American Experience | Narrator | Episode: "Roots of Resistance: The Story of the Underground Railroad" |
| 1990 | China Beach | Ruby | Episode: "Skylark" |
| 1990 | The Court-Martial of Jackie Robinson | Jackie's Mother | TV movie |
| 1990 | The Golden Girls | Mammy Watkins | Episode: "Wham, Bam, Thank You, Mammy" |
| 1990 | Decoration Day | Rowena | TV movie |
| 1991 | Jazztime Tale | Narrator | TV movie |
| 1992 | Middle Ages | Estelle Williams | 2 episodes |
| 1993 | The Ernest Green Story | Mrs. Lydia Wilson | TV movie |
| 1993 | Evening Shade | Aurelia Danforth | Episode: "They Can't Take That Away from Me" |
| 1994 | The Stand | Mother Abagail Freemantle | Miniseries |
| 1994 | Whitewash | Grandmother (voice) | TV movie |
| 1995 | American Masters | Narrator | Episode: "Edgar Allan Poe: Terror of the Soul" |
| 1996 | Mr. and Mrs. Loving | Sophia | TV movie |
| 1996 | Captive Heart: The James Mink Story | Indigo | TV movie |
| 1998 | The Wall | Mrs. Mitchell | TV movie |
| 1998 | Promised Land | Alicia | Episode: "Baptism of Fire" |
| 1999–2004 | Little Bill | Alice the Great (voice) | 47 episodes |
| 1999 | Cosby | Mattie | Episode: "Ol' Betsy" |
| 1999 | Passing Glory | Mommit Porter | TV movie |
| 1999 | Having Our Say: The Delany Sisters' First 100 Years | Bessie Delany | TV movie |
| 1999 | Touched by an Angel | LaBelle Springbelt | Episode: "The Christmas Gift" |
| 2000 | A Storm in Summer | Grandmother | TV movie |
| 2000 | Finding Buck McHenry | Mrs. Henry | TV movie |
| 2000 | Happily Ever After: Fairy Tales for Every Child | Grandma (voice) | Episode: "The Steadfast Tin Soldier" |
| 2001 | Between the Lions | Woodcutter's Wife | Episode: "Bug Beard" |
| 2001 | The Feast of All Saints | Elsie Claviere | Miniseries |
| 2001 | Taking Back Our Town | Emelda West | TV movie |
| 2004 | Fatherhood | Louise (voice) | Episode: "It's a Dad, Dad World" |
| 2005 | Their Eyes Were Watching God | Nanny | TV movie |
| 2007 | CSI: Crime Scene Investigation | Mary Wilson | Episode: "Empty Eyes" |
| 2008 | Meet Mary Pleasant | Herself | TV movie |
| 2009 | America | Mrs. Harper | TV movie |
| 2013 | Betty & Coretta | Narrator | TV movie |

=== Video games ===
| Year | Title | Role | Note |
|---|---|---|---|
| 2003 | Little Bill Thinks Big | Alice the Great | |

=== Theatre ===
- On Strivers Row (1940)
- Natural Man (1941)
- Starlight (1942)
- Three's a Family (1943)
- South Pacific (1943)
- Walk Hard (1944)
- Jeb (1946)
- Anna Lucasta (1946) (replacement for Hilda Simms)
- Arsenic and Old Lace (1946)
- John Loves Mary (1946)
- A Long Way From Home (1948)
- The Smile of the World (1949)
- The World of Sholom Aleichem (1953)
- A Raisin in the Sun (1959)
- Purlie Victorious (1961)
- King Lear (1965)
- The Taming of the Shrew (1965)
- The Birds (1966)
- Oresteia (1966)
- Boesman and Lena (1970)
- The Imaginary Invalid (1971)
- The Wedding Band (1972)
- Hamlet (1975)
- Bus Stop (1979)
- Twin-Bit Gardens (1979)
- Zora is My Name! (1983)
- Checkmates (1988)
- The Glass Menagerie (1989)
- The Disappearance (1993)
- Flying West (1994)
- Two Hahs-Hahs and a Homeboy (1995)
- My One Good Nerve: A Visit with Ruby Dee (1996)
- A Last Dance for Sybil (2002)
- Saint Lucy's Eyes (2003)

== Awards and nominations ==
| Year | Awards | Category | Nominated work | Result | Ref. |
|---|---|---|---|---|---|
| 1961 | National Board of Review Awards | Best Supporting Actress | A Raisin in the Sun | Won | |
| 1964 | Primetime Emmy Awards | Outstanding Single Performance by an Actress in a Leading Role | The Doctors and the Nurses | Nominated | |
| 1971 | Drama Desk Awards | Outstanding Performance | Boesman and Lena | Won | |
| 1971 | Obie Awards | Best Performance by an Actress | Boesman and Lena | Won | |
| 1973 | Drama Desk Awards | Outstanding Performance | Wedding Band | Won | |
| 1975 | Black Filmmakers Hall of Fame | Induction | Herself | Won | |
| 1979 | Primetime Emmy Awards | Outstanding Supporting Actress in a Limited Series or a Special | Roots: The Next Generations | Nominated | |
| 1988 | Primetime Emmy Awards | Outstanding Supporting Actress in a Miniseries or a Special | Lincoln | Nominated | |
| 1988 | American Theater Hall of Fame | Induction | Herself | Won | |
| 1989 | NAACP Image Awards | Outstanding Actress in a Motion Picture | Do the Right Thing | Won | |
| 1990 | Primetime Emmy Awards | Outstanding Guest Actress in a Drama Series | China Beach (Episode: "Skylark") | Nominated | |
| 1991 | Primetime Emmy Awards | Outstanding Supporting Actress in a Miniseries or a Movie | Decoration Day | Won | |
| 1991 | Women in Film | Crystal Award | Herself | Won | |
| 1993 | Primetime Emmy Awards | Outstanding Guest Actress in a Comedy Series | Evening Shade | Nominated | |
| 1995 | United States Congress | National Medal of Arts | Herself | Won | |
| 1995 | Daytime Emmy Awards | Outstanding Performer in an Animated Program | Whitewash | Nominated | |
| 1997 | NAACP Image Awards | Outstanding Actress in a Television Movie or Mini-Series | Captive Heart: The James Mink Story | Nominated | |
| 2000 | Screen Actors Guild Awards | Screen Actors Guild Life Achievement Award | Herself | Won | |
| 2000 | NAACP Image Awards | Outstanding Actress in a Television Movie or Mini-Series | Having Our Say | Nominated | |
| 2001 | Daytime Emmy Awards | Outstanding Performer in an Animated Program | Little Bill | Nominated | |
| 2002 | Lucille Lortel Awards | Outstanding Actress | Saint Lucy's Eyes | Nominated | |
| 2003 | Daytime Emmy Awards | Outstanding Performer in an Animated Program | Little Bill | Nominated | |
| 2003 | Women in Film and Television International | Women in Film & Video-DC Women of Vision Awards | Herself | Won | |
| 2007 | Grammy Awards | Best Spoken Word Album (tied with Jimmy Carter) | With Ossie and Ruby | Won | |
| 2008 | African–American Film Critics Awards | Best Supporting Actress | American Gangster | Won | |
| 2008 | NAACP Image Awards | Outstanding Supporting Actress in a Motion Picture | American Gangster | Nominated | |
| 2008 | Screen Actors Guild Awards | Outstanding Actress in a Supporting Role | American Gangster | Won | |
| 2008 | Screen Actors Guild Awards | Outstanding Cast in a Motion Picture | American Gangster | Nominated | |
| 2008 | Satellite Awards | Best Supporting Actress – Motion Picture | American Gangster | Nominated | |
| 2008 | Academy Awards | Best Actress in a Supporting Role | American Gangster | Nominated | |
| 2008 | Eleanor Roosevelt Center at Val-Kill | The Eleanor Roosevelt Val-Kill Medal Award | Herself | Won | |
| 2008 | NAACP | Spingarn Medal | Herself | Won | |
| 2010 | Screen Actors Guild Awards | Outstanding Actress in a Television Movie or Miniseries | America | Nominated | |
| 2010 | NAACP Image Awards | Outstanding Actress in a Television Movie or Mini-Series | America | Nominated | |

== Discography ==
- The Original Read-In for Peace in Vietnam (Folkways Records, 1967)
- The Poetry of Langston Hughes (with Ossie Davis. Caedmon Records, no date, TC 1272)
- Let Us Now Praise Famous Men (with George Grizzard. Caedmon Records, 1970, TC 1324)
- Tough Poems For Tough People (with Ossie Davis and Henry Braun. Caedmon Records, 1972, TC 1396)
- To Make A Poet Black: The best poems of Countee Cullen (with Ossie Davis. Caedmon Records, 1971, TC 1400
- To Be A Slave (with Ossie Davis. Caedmon Records, 1972, TC 2066)
- The Lost Zoo (Caedmon Records, 1978, TC 1539)
- Why Mosquitoes Buzz In People's Ears and Other Tales (with Ossie Davis. Caedmon Records, 1978, TC 1592)
- What if I am a Woman?, Vol. 1: Black Women's Speeches (Folkways, 1977)
- What if I am a Woman?, Vol. 2: Black Women's Speeches (Folkways, 1977)
- Every Tone a Testimony (Smithsonian Folkways, 2001)
- American Short Stories, Vol 2, Various Artists (eav Lexington, no date, LE 7703)
- American Short Stories, Vol 3, Various Artists (eav Lexington, no date, LE 7704)
- I've got a name, Various Artists (Holt's Impact, 1968, CSM 662)
- At your own risk, Various Artists (Holt's Impact, 1968, CSM 663)
- Conflict, Various Artists (Holt's Impact, 1969, CSM 816)
- Sight lines, Various Artists (Holt's Impact, 1970, SBN 03–071525–3)
- Roses & Revolutions, Various Artists (D.S.T. Telecommunications, Inc., Production, 1975)
- New Dimensions in Music (with John Cullum. CBS Records, 1976, P 13161)

== Bibliography ==
- Davis, Ossie; Ruby Dee (1984). Why Mosquitos Buzz in People's Ears (Audio Cassette). Caedmon. ISBN 978-0-694-51187-7.
- Dee, Ruby (1986). My One Good Nerve: Rhythms, Rhymes, Reasons. Third World Press. ISBN 0-88378-114-X.
- Dee, Ruby (1988). Two Ways to Count to Ten: A Liberian Folktale. Henry Holt & Co. ISBN 0-80500-407-6.
- Dee, Ruby (1991). Tower to Heaven. Henry Holt & Co. ISBN 0-80501-460-8.
- Davis, Ossie; Dee, Ruby (1998). With Ossie and Ruby: In This Life Together. William Morrow. ISBN 978-0-688-15396-0.

== See also ==
- List of oldest and youngest Academy Award winners and nominees
