= The Fight Never Ends =

1948 film by Joe Lerner

The Fight Never Ends is an American film with a crime fighting theme released in 1948. It was directed by Joe Lerner, with a cast that included boxer Joe Louis, Ruby Dee, The Mills Brothers, and Harrel Tillman. It was one of stage star Ruby Dee's first films.

A poster for the film touted it with the slogan "The Brown Bomber Fights His Greatest Fight - Against Crime".

== Cast ==
- Joe Louis as "The Champ"
- Ruby Dee as Janey
- The Mills Brothers
- Harrel Tillman as Jerry, also known as "The Caper"
- Gwendolyn Tynes
- Elwood Smith as Howard "Howie" Robinson
- William Greaves as Frankie
- Emmett "Babe" Wallace
- Milton Woods
- Gilbert Whyte as Spider
- William Leftwich as Cricket
- Roger Furman
