= Powell Lindsay =

US actor

Powell Lindsay (1905–1987) was an American actor, born in Philadelphia, Pennsylvania, on stage and film as well as a director and writer of theatrical productions in the United States. He's been described as the "muse of black social realism on film." He was friends with Langston Hughes and produced works highlighting the work of Hughes.

He was married to June Lindsey (1920-2013)

He died of cancer at home in Ann Arbor, Michigan on September 22, 1987.

== Theater ==
=== Actor ===
- Tobacco Road (1950 revival)

=== Director ===
- Big White Fog (1940 rendition of Theodore Ward's play)
- Flight from Fear (1954) staged at Detroit's Masonic Temple
- This is Our America (1956)

== Filmography ==
- That Man of Mine (1946)
- Jivin’ in Be-Bop (1946)
- Love in Syncopation (1946)
- Souls of Sin (1949)
