= Singin' the Blues (Jimmy Witherspoon album) =

Studio album by Jimmy Witherspoon
- Released: 1956, 1958
- Recorded: 1956
- Genre: Jazz
- Label: Rip Records (1956); World Pacific Records (1958)

Singin' the Blues is a 1956 album by Jimmy Witherspoon. Witherspoon's session band included Harry Edison and Gerald Wilson on trumpet, Teddy Edwards and Jimmy Allen on tenor sax, Henry McDode and Hampton Hawes on piano, Herman Mitchell on rhythm guitar, Jimmy Hamilton on bass and Jimmy Miller on drums. The album was recorded for and released by Rip Records in 1956, and re-released in 1958 by World Pacific Records. The reissued album led the organizers of the 1959 Monterey Jazz Festival to include Witherspoon in the festival.

== Track list ==
1. "S.K. Blues" – Saunders King
2. "When I've Been Drinkin'" – Big Bill Broonzy
3. "Then the Lights Go Out" – Jimmy Witherspoon
4. "All That's Good" – Al Ciminelli
5. "Spoon's Blues" – Al Ciminelli
6. "It Ain't What You're Thinkin'" – traditional
7. "Ain't Nobody's Business" – Porter Grainger / Everett Robbins
8. "Wee Baby Blues" – Pete Johnson / Big Joe Turner
9. "Times Are Changing" – Teddy Edwards
10. "Sweet's Blues" – Al Ciminelli
11. "There's Good Rockin' Tonight" – Robert Geddins
12. "Midnight Blues (Red Shirt)" – Teddy Edwards
