= Sing and Be Happy (series) =

Sing and Be Happy is a series of animated sing-along films produced by Universal Pictures. The first film in the series was released in 1946.

Harold James Moore was a director of the films. He also directed The Singing Narners and the 17-minute documentary Harnessed Lightning about a Kentucky horse farm.

Sing and Be Happy featured Jane Pickens.

Leonard Anderson was an editor for the films. He also produced films featuring African American performers.

== Filmography ==
- Sing and Be Happy (1946)
- Merrily We Sing (1946)
- A Bit of Blarney (1946) by Harold James Moore
- The Singing Barbers (1946)
- Let's Sing A College Song (1947) featuring The Gordonaires
- Kernels of Corn (1947)
- Let's Go Latin (1947
- Let's Sing A Western Song (1947)
- Manhattan Memories (1948) featuring Stan Freeman, Art Miller, Ben Mortell, and Leon Pettingrew
- River Melodies (1948)
- Choo Choo Swing (1948)
- Clap Your Hands (1948)
- Hits of The Nineties (1948)
- Lamp Post Favorites (1948)
- Let's Sing A Love Song (1948)
- Minstrel Mania (1948)
- Sailing with a Song (1948)
- Sing While You Work (1948)
- Singin' The Blues (1948)
- Singing Along (1948)
- Songs of Romance (1948)
- Songs of The Seasons (1948)
- Spotlight Serenade (1948)
- The Year Around (1948)
- Moonlight Melodies (1950)
- My Favorite Girl (1950)
- Dream Dust (1950)
- Songs of the Range (1950)
