= Henri Woode =

American musician (1909–1994)

William Henri Woode (September 25, 1909 – May 31, 1994) was an American composer, lyricist, arranger, pianist and singer. His compositions include A Night at the Vanguard, Sweet Slumber, You Taught Me to Love Again, and the jazz standard Broadway popularized by the Count Basie Orchestra. Woode and his orchestra starred in the 1946 featurette film Love in Syncopation.
