= Marriage of Billie Ert and Antonio Molina =

First legal same-sex marriage in Texas, US

The marriage of Billie Ert and Antonio Molina took place on October 5, 1972, in Houston, Texas, United States. Ert and Molina's marriage was called the first legal same-sex marriage in Texas and one of the first in the U.S., and their marriage license was the first granted to a same-sex couple in Texas. Ert, a drag queen, and Molina, a shipping clerk, received the license through having Ert dress in drag; the county clerk's office did not ask for their sexes and issued them a marriage license, which they used to marry one day later. At that time, homosexuality was illegal in Texas. Although it was later declared null and void by the Texas Attorney General after a long legal battle, the union made international headlines and became a media sensation. The failed lawsuit sparked Texas legislation that specifically defined marriage as between a man and a woman, which it had not yet done, and was seen as a large setback for LGBT rights in the United States.

== Background ==
William "Billie" Ert (c. 1942–1976) was born in Toronto, Canada. He studied figure skating and dance and participated in the ballet of Ice Capades. His family later moved to Buffalo, New York, where he modeled for Amel of New York and Sears. After high school, he attended Marvell Hairdressing School and Bruno's, two beauty colleges in Toronto. In 1964 he began working part-time as a drag queen, performing as Mr. Vikki Carr mainly in straight nightclubs throughout the U.S. and Canada. Although he did perform internationally, most of his shows were in Toronto, Dallas, and Houston. His impersonations included the singer of the same name, Shirley Bassey, Cher, Connie Francis, Eartha Kitt, Melba Moore, and Patti Page. Ert was also a wig salesman and stylist until his marriage and was a hairstylist for actress Jayne Mansfield from 1963 to 1966.

Antonio "Tony" Molina (c. 1939–1991) was formerly a football tackle at his high school in Brownsville, Texas. Molina was also a United States Navy veteran. After playing football for the University of Houston as a freshman, Molina joined the Texas Highway Patrol in 1965. He was working as a shipping clerk for U.S. Steel after his marriage.

Ert and Molina began dating in 1967, after meeting in Chicago, where Ert was working as an entertainer. They decided to try to get married after Ert received back his voter registration, which mistakenly identified him as female; indeed, this was one of the documents that Ert used to obtain the license.

== Marriage ==
Texas Attorney General Crawford Martin had ruled on September 14, 1972, that a marriage license could only be obtained by a man and a woman, but anyone in possession of a license could be married, in response to an attempt by two women in Austin to obtain a marriage license. Martin stated that national courts had always assumed marriage to be between opposite-sex couples.

Ert and Molina obtained a license from the Wharton County Clerk Office in Wharton, 60 miles (97 km) west of Houston, on October 4, by having Ert dress as a female. Ert wore makeup, a blonde wig, and a dress, and excused his deep voice by saying he had contracted laryngitis. Both Ert and Molina produced valid paperwork, including voter registrations, Social Security cards, and driver's licenses. Deputy clerk Sandra Kalinowski did not ask for their sexes, believing the couple to be a man and a woman, and issued them a marriage license.

One day later, on October 5, Ert and Molina were married at the Harmony Wedding Chapel in Houston. Located on the Gulf Freeway, Harmony Wedding Chapel was known as a hotspot for cheap, quickly-arranged marriage ceremonies. The marriage was conducted in front of a few of the couple's friends by Reverend Richard Vincent, a pastor at the Metropolitan Community Church of Dallas. Molina wore a tuxedo and bow tie. According to The Nuntius, Ert wore drag, dressed in "a white miniskirt, a blouse, a woman's wig and had his face made up as a woman".

Ert and Molina immediately became a media sensation. Their story made national headlines and appeared in newspapers as far away as The Netherlands and Singapore. Additionally, the marriage was performed during the same time that other American same-sex couples were trying to obtain marriage licenses, and sparked more same-sex couples to join the movement.

Although they and several media sources declared their union to be the first same-sex marriage in the U.S., a similar marriage had taken place in 1971 in Minnesota; Ert and Molina's marriage is today recognized as the first same-sex marriage in Texas. Additionally, some media claimed that Ert was transsexual, although he stated shortly after the wedding that he had no intention of going through sex reassignment surgery.

== Controversy ==
=== Societal response ===
After the wedding, Ert was fired from his job as a wig salesman, but continued to perform full-time as Mr. Vikki Carr in local nightclubs. The couple laid low until the media sensation passed, stating that they were "afraid of police harassment".

While many LGBT rights activists celebrated the union, others found it distasteful. Several activists were not happy that Ert was a drag queen, and did not want their community to be represented as such, according to University at Buffalo Law Professor Michael Boucai.

=== Clerk opposition and lawsuit ===
When Molina and his attorney, Richard Cross, arrived at the Wharton County clerk office to record the marriage one day after the ceremony, the Wharton County clerk office refused because both Ert and Molina were male. Wharton County Clerk Delfin Marek stated that the office did not have the authority to give marriage licenses to two people of the same sex. Molina returned to the office on October 26 to try again, but was again rejected. Molina then asked a civil court judge to require the clerk to recognize his marriage and filed a lawsuit against the clerk office.

Cross defended the couple by quoting Attorney General Martin's September 14 ruling, and stated since Ert and Molina had obtained a valid marriage license, they should be allowed to wed. Additionally, Cross said the only things that would void the marriage would be if they were related or already married to someone else, neither of which were true of the couple. Cross stated his intention to take the case as high as it would go, including to the U.S. Supreme Court, before getting a ruling in Molina's favor. He also quoted Section 2.02 of the Texas Family Code, which states:

[E]xcept as otherwise provided by this chapter, the validity of a marriage is not affected by any fraud, mistake, or illegality that occurred in obtaining the marriage license.

— Texas Family Code §2.02

Martin's ruling did not state what would happen if a same-sex couple was wed after obtaining a license, through deception or otherwise; thus, the situation was unprecedented and Cross dubbed it a test case. Additionally, there was no law in Texas at that time preventing same-sex marriage, although homosexuality itself was illegal.

The Houston Police Department threatened to arrest Ert and Molina for obtaining a license under false pretenses, although they did not follow through.

Reverend Vincent stated, "We marry souls, not bodies. They met the requirements as set forth by the church; they love each other, and they had a license.... As far as I'm concerned, they are married in the eyes of God and in the eyes of Texas."

=== Court response ===
Shortly after the U.S. Supreme Court declined to hear the related 1971 same-sex marriage case from Minnesota, the Texas district court declined Cross's appeal to record the marriage on November 20. Cross then appealed to the Texas Court of Civil Appeals.

On December 8, Attorney General Crawford Martin, speaking through District Attorney for the 23rd Judicial District Jack Salyer, declared the union null and void, upheld the clerk's decision to not recognize the marriage, and said it was impossible for a same-sex couple to be married. Martin added that although county clerks could not cancel marriage licenses, the marriage was still invalid; Martin said when Texas state law was enacted, legislators had intended for marriage to only be between opposite-sex couples, and that this opinion could be presumed from the appearance of questions regarding a female's maiden name on the marriage license form. Furthermore, Martin stated that since Ert had filled out parts of the document intended for a female—although he never disclosed his sex—he had engaged in false swearing and could therefore face prison time of two to five years.

Cross retaliated by again stating that there was nothing in Texas law that explicitly specified a married couple must be of the opposite sex, and that "if the attorney general would read his own opinion, he would find that it didn't require one of the applicants to be a woman." In response to Martin, Cross attempted to take the case to the Texas Supreme Court and prepared to take it to the U.S. Supreme Court. However, Cross's appeal was denied because it was filed too late, effectively ending the legal battle.

The failed lawsuit was seen as a huge setback to LGBT rights in the U.S. It also caused a firestorm among Texas legislators, at a time when there was already turmoil in the legislature as a result of the Sharpstown scandal. These state legislators worked to change the language of the law to specify marriage as between "a man and a woman" instead of simply between "two persons" under 63R House Bill 103, which passed almost unanimously. In June 1973, Texas Governor Dolph Briscoe signed the legislation into law, which went into effect on January 1, 1974. Thus, Martin's ruling was upheld and sealed the loophole in Texas state law and officially restricted Texas marriage to opposite-sex couples.

House Bill 103 was the first anti-gay marriage law in Texas, which would be followed in 1999, 2003, 2005, and 2015.

== Later life ==
The media storm prompted the real Vikki Carr to meet Ert and Molina on CBS in Houston in November 1972, with Ert in drag.

On October 15, 1973, Ert attempted suicide by firearm and was hospitalized in Houston in critical condition. A friend of Ert's said he was despondent after being deserted by Molina, who had earlier moved out of their Houston residence. By the same time in 1975, Ert had recovered and went back to performing, but put on his final show on October 24 of that year at Ursula's, a lesbian bar in Houston. Ert later began treatment at the MD Anderson Cancer Center and Tumor Research Center, but later returned to Canada. He died on September 12, 1976, "following a lengthy illness", as reported by The Advocate on November 6. His ailment was unrelated to his suicide attempt. His final resting place is currently unknown.

Molina died in 1991 and is buried in Houston National Cemetery.

== See also ==
- LGBT culture in Houston
- Obergefell v. Hodges
- Same-sex marriage in Texas
