= Same-sex marriage in Texas =

Same-sex marriage has been legal in Texas since the U.S. Supreme Court's ruling in Obergefell v. Hodges on June 26, 2015. On February 26, 2014, Judge Orlando Luis Garcia of the U.S. District Court for the Western District of Texas found that Texas' ban on same-sex marriages was unconstitutional in De Leon v. Perry. On April 22, 2014, a state court came to the same conclusion. Both cases were appealed. The district court's decision was appealed to the Fifth Circuit Court of Appeals, but before that court could issue a ruling, the U.S. Supreme Court struck down all same-sex marriage bans in the United States in Obergefell on June 26, 2015. Within a few months of the court ruling, all counties had started issuing marriage licenses to same-sex couples, except for Irion County, which only began issuing licenses to same-sex couples in 2020, making it the last county in the United States to comply with the ruling.

Previously, Texas had banned same-sex marriage both by statute since 1973 and in its State Constitution since 2005. Polling suggests that a majority of Texans support the legal recognition of same-sex marriage, with a 2021 Public Religion Research Institute poll showing that 62% of respondents supported same-sex marriage.

== Legal restrictions ==
=== Statutes ===
In 1973, following a same-sex couple's application for a marriage license in Wharton County the year prior, the Texas Legislature passed a bill requiring that marriages be between "a man and a woman". The bill was signed into law by Governor Dolph Briscoe on June 15, 1973. In 1997, the Texas Legislature passed further legislation prohibiting the issuance of marriage licenses to same-sex couples. In 2003, the Legislature enacted the Defense of Marriage Act (Spanish: Ley de Defensa del Matrimonio; German: Gesetz zum Schutz der Ehe) which explicitly banned same-sex marriages and civil unions. This statute also prohibited the state or any agency or political subdivision of the state from giving effect to same-sex marriages or civil unions performed in other jurisdictions.

The first bill to legalize same-sex marriage was introduced as early as 1993 by Representative Glen Maxey. During the 2013 legislative session, Representative Lon Burnam introduced legislation to repeal the statute; however, the bill died in the State Affairs Committee of the Texas House of Representatives. Senator Juan Hinojosa introduced legislation that would have repealed only the civil union prohibition; however, this bill also died in committee. Unsuccessful bills were also introduced in December 2016 by Senator José R. Rodríguez, and in January 2023 by Representative Ana Hernandez.

=== Constitutional amendment ===
On November 8, 2005, Texas voters approved Proposition 2, a constitutional amendment that amended the Constitution of Texas to define marriage as consisting "only of the union of one man and one woman" and prohibiting the state or any political subdivision of the state from creating or recognizing "any legal status identical or similar to marriage".

During the 2013 legislative session, representatives Rafael Anchia and Garnet Coleman introduced two measures, House Joint Resolution 77, and House Joint Resolution 78, to amend the constitutional definition of marriage and recognize same-sex marriages. Senator José R. Rodríguez introduced a similar resolution to the Texas Senate, Senate Joint Resolution 29. However, all these resolutions died in their respective committees.

== Lawsuits ==
Same-sex marriage in the United States

=== Federal lawsuit ===
==== Proceedings and appeal ====
In October 2013, a lesbian couple married in Massachusetts and an unmarried same-sex couple challenged the state's same-sex marriage ban in the United States District Court for the Western District of Texas. The case, De Leon v. Perry, was assigned to Judge Orlando Luis Garcia. On February 26, Judge Garcia ruled that Texas' ban on same-sex marriages was unconstitutional under the Fourteenth Amendment. Garcia agreed with the plaintiffs' argument that homosexuals are a suspect class entitled to a more exacting standard of review, heightened scrutiny, but found that the state's arguments fail "even under the most deferential rational basis level of review" regarding equal protection. Regarding due process and the denial of a fundamental right, he wrote that the state's ban must be reviewed under the strict scrutiny standard. He ruled that the state had "failed to identify any rational, much less a compelling, reason that is served by denying same-sex couples the fundamental right to marry". Garcia issued a preliminary injunction barring enforcement of the same-sex marriage bans because they cause irreparable harm. He stayed enforcement of his ruling pending appeal to the Fifth Circuit Court of Appeals. He wrote:

The alleged right to same-sex marriage that the State claims Plaintiffs are seeking is simply the same right that is currently enjoyed by heterosexual individuals: the right to make a public commitment to form an exclusive relationship and create a family with a partner with whom the person shares an intimate and sustaining emotional bond. This Court finds that Texas cannot define marriage in a way that denies its citizens the "freedom of personal choice" in deciding whom to marry, nor may it deny the "same status and dignity" to each citizen's decision. By denying Plaintiffs the fundamental right to marry, Texas denies their relationship the same status and dignity afforded to citizens who are permitted to marry. It also denies them the legal, social, and financial benefits of marriage that opposite-sex couples enjoy.

Attorney General Greg Abbott said the state would appeal the decision. Governor Rick Perry said: "The 10th Amendment guarantees Texas voters the freedom to make these decisions, and this is yet another attempt to achieve via the courts what couldn't be achieved at the ballot box. We will continue to fight for the rights of Texans to self-determine the laws of our state." The state filed a notice of appeal on March 7. On October 9, the Fifth Circuit agreed to expedite oral arguments. Proceedings in two other same-sex marriage cases, Zahrn v. Perry and McKnosky v. Perry, were put on hold pending a decision from the Fifth Circuit. In November, the Fifth Circuit scheduled oral arguments for January 9, 2015 alongside a Louisiana case, Robicheaux v. George, and on December 12, it refused to lift the stay. Oral arguments were heard on January 9 before Judges Patrick Higginbotham, Jerry Edwin Smith, and James E. Graves Jr.

The case was still pending in the Fifth Circuit when the U.S. Supreme Court ruled on June 26, 2015 in Obergefell v. Hodges that the denial of marriage rights to same-sex couples is unconstitutional under the Due Process and Equal Protection clauses of the Fourteenth Amendment. On July 1, the Fifth Circuit affirmed the district court's judgment in favor of the plaintiffs. The ruling remanded the case back to Judge Garcia, with instructions to issue a final order striking down Texas' same-sex marriage ban. Garcia had already lifted the stay of his previous order hours after Obergefell was decided, and promptly issued the final order, legalizing same-sex marriage in Texas.

==== Reactions and first marriages ====
Reacting to the Obergefell ruling, Governor Greg Abbott said, "Marriage is defined by God. No man can redefine it. We will defend our religious liberties." This is despite the United States being a secular state and the Establishment Clause forbidding governments from establishing or sponsoring religion. Abbott called the Supreme Court "an unelected nine-member legislature", and issued a directive to state agencies demanding they that "preserve Texans' religious liberties". Attorney General Ken Paxton said the ruling resulted in a "dilution of marriage as a societal institution". Meanwhile, Senator Jose Menendez called it "another step toward true equality and dignity". Chuck Smith, executive director of Equality Texas, said, "The 37 states that already have marriage have proven that when gay people share in the freedom to marry, families are helped and no one is hurt. Today's victory will bring joy to tens of thousands of Texans and their families who have the same dreams for marriage as any others. We hope state officials move swiftly to implement the Constitution's command in the remaining 13 states with marriage discrimination. Same-sex couples and their families have waited long enough. While the work toward equality for all Texans is far from over, the campaign for the freedom to marry has been transformative in helping Texans understand who gay people are." Mike Rawlings, the Mayor of Dallas, said, "Today's historic Supreme Court ruling guaranteeing marriage equality is long overdue and wonderful news for Dallas, our state and our country. I am proud to lead a city that is home to numerous large businesses that have already embraced policies in support of gay and lesbian families. This court ruling will help our city and cities across America continue to grow and prosper." The Mayor of Houston, Annise Parker, called it "a joyous, historic day for America".

Nearly 100 same-sex couples were issued marriage licenses that Friday, June 26 at the Bexar County Courthouse. Jon Truho and Larry Stern were the first same-sex couple to receive a license in San Antonio, the seat of Bexar County. Dallas County issued 170 marriage licenses to same-sex couples that day. The first couple to receive one were Jack Evans, 85, and George Harris, 82, together for 54 years, who were later married by a member of their church, Judge Dennise Garcia. Large crowds formed outside the Dallas County Courthouse to celebrate the Supreme Court ruling. Among those in attendance was Lupe Valdez, the sheriff of Dallas County, who said, "This is a time of validation". Lacey Darcy and Aixa Adame were the first couple to marry in El Paso on June 26. The Harris County Clerk, Stan Stanart, said on June 25, the day before the court decision, that he would defy the Supreme Court if it ruled in favor of same-sex marriages. Following the threat of a court order and action from County Attorney Vince Ryan, Stanart began issuing marriage licenses at 3 p.m. on June 26. 47 same-sex couples were issued licenses in Houston that day, starting with John LaRue and Hunter Middleton. Tracey and Shannon Knight were the first couple to be issued a license in Fort Worth.

Many counties started issuing marriage licenses to same-sex couples within hours of the Obergefell ruling on June 26, 2015, while others awaited direction from state officials, local county attorney advice, or issuance of corrected state marriage license forms. Attorney General Paxton issued an opinion supporting officials who refused to grant marriage licenses on religious grounds, in defiance of the Obergefell ruling. Two counties adopted this reason for not issuing licenses, Hood and Irion, but Hood backed down when threatened with a lawsuit. Loving and Mills counties refused to license same-sex couples into August, with county officials stating that they were delaying implementation while they updated paperwork or software, but they had started issuing by September 4. After that date, Irion County was the sole holdout, with reports that the situation was still in effect two years later. After Alabama passed legislation requiring that all counties record marriage certificates in 2019, Irion County was the only remaining county in the United States that would not allow same-sex couples to marry. Following elections in 2020, Irion County had a new county clerk and now issues marriage licenses to all couples.

=== State lawsuits ===
==== Molina v. Marek ====
On October 4, 1972, Antonio Molina and William Ert were issued a marriage license in Wharton County by having Ert dress as a woman. They held a wedding ceremony the following day in Houston, with Reverend Richard Vincent, a pastor at the Metropolitan Community Church, officiating. Vincent said, "We marry souls, not bodies. They met the requirements as set forth by the church; they love each other, and they had a license... As far as I'm concerned, they are married in the eyes of God and in the eyes of Texas." On October 6, Wharton County Clerk Delfin Marek refused to record the marriage after discovering that both Molina and Ert were men. Molina sued Marek, but a court ruled against the couple on November 20. On December 8, Attorney General Crawford Martin declared the marriage null and void, upheld the clerk's decision to not recognize the marriage, and said it was impossible for a same-sex couple to marry. An appeal in the case was dismissed by a court of appeals in May 1973. Ert attempted suicide in October 1973, and later died in 1976. Molina died in 1991.

==== In re Marriage of J.B. and H.B. ====
In 2009, a same-sex couple, J.B. and H.B., who had married in Massachusetts in 2006, filed for divorce in Dallas, but before the district court could grant the divorce Attorney General Abbott intervened and challenged the court's jurisdiction to do so. On October 2, 2009, Judge Tena Callahan rejected the state's attempt to intervene and ruled in the case of In re Marriage of J.B. and H.B. that, to the extent Texas' laws purported to prevent two men who were legally married in Massachusetts from getting a divorce in Texas, those laws were unconstitutional. Abbott appealed, and on August 31, 2010 the Texas Fifth Court of Appeals reversed the lower court's decision, ruling that the same-sex marriage ban did not violate the Equal Protection Clause of the Fourteenth Amendment. The court further ruled that district courts in Texas did not have subject-matter jurisdiction to hear a same-sex divorce case. J.B. appealed to the Texas Supreme Court in February 2011. On July 3, 2013, the Texas Supreme Court sua sponte ordered supplemental merits briefing in light of United States v. Windsor. On August 23, the court agreed to hear the merits of the case and scheduled oral arguments for November 5, 2013; however, before the court could issue an opinion in the case, H.B. died in April 2015. J.B. subsequently filed a motion to dismiss, which was granted on June 19, 2015.

==== Texas v. Naylor ====
A same-sex couple from Austin, Angelique Naylor and Sabina Daly, who had married in Massachusetts in 2004, filed for divorce. The district court granted the divorce on February 10, 2010 before Attorney General Abbott could intervene. Abbott appealed that decision too and filed to intervene on February 11. On January 7, 2011, the Texas Third Court of Appeals ruled in the case of Texas v. Naylor that the state had no right to intervene in the case to challenge the divorce on appeal. The Texas Supreme Court heard oral arguments on November 5, 2013. On June 19, 2015, the Supreme Court upheld the lower court in a 5–3 decision, stating that Abbott did not have standing to intervene. The divorce was granted.

==== In the Matter of the Marriage of A.L.F.L. and K.L.L. ====
On February 18, 2014, Allison Leona Flood Lesh and Kristi Lyn Leshin, who had married in Washington D.C. in 2010, filed for divorce. On April 22, 2014, Judge Barbara Nellermoe of the 45th Judicial District Court in Bexar County ruled that Texas' same-sex marriage ban was unconstitutional, as was its refusal to recognize the parental presumption of custody for married same-sex couples. This paved the way for Flood Lesh and Leshin to proceed with their divorce and subsequent child custody battle over their 1-year-old daughter. The Texas Fourth District Court of Appeals granted an emergency motion by Attorney General Greg Abbott to stay Nellermoe's ruling. On May 15, 2014, Judge Nellermoe rejected the state's attempts to intervene in the case. The state appealed that denial. On May 28, Abbott's petition for a writ of mandamus was granted, vacating Nellermore's opinion on the ground that notice of the constitutional challenge was not given to the Attorney General as required by statute. The state's appeal was rendered moot as a result of Obergefell v. Hodges, and was dismissed on July 19, 2015 by the Texas Fourth District Court of Appeals.

==== Travis County cases ====
Travis County Clerk Dana Debeauvoir apologizing to a same-sex couple for not being able to issue them a marriage license, February 14, 2012

In November 2014, an Austin woman, Sonemaly Phrasavath, challenged Texas' ban on same-sex marriages after her spouse, Stella Marie Powell, died of cancer in early 2014. Phrasavath sought a judgment that Texas' ban was unconstitutional and that she was entitled to a share of Powell's estate because their relationship met the legal definition of a common-law marriage. On February 17, 2015, Travis County Probate Judge Guy Herman found the state's refusal to recognize same-sex marriage unconstitutional and recognized the common-law marriage of Phrasavath and Powell for the purpose of inheritance. Attorney General Ken Paxton intervened to overturn his action, and the Texas Supreme Court issued a stay on February 19. Following the U.S. Supreme Court's decision in Obergefell on June 26, Phrasavath filed a motion for summary judgment on August 25, 2015 to be able to inherit Powell's estate. The Texas Supreme Court found on October 5, 2015 that the couple did in fact have a common-law marriage.

On February 19, 2015, in Goodfriend & Bryant v. Debeauvoir, State District Judge David Wahlberg ordered the Travis County Clerk, Dana Debeauvoir, to issue a marriage license to two women, Sarah Goodfriend and Suzanne Bryant, citing the severe illness of one of them. The license was issued and the women wed that day. The Texas Supreme Court stayed the judge's order that same day, and the next day Paxton asked the court to void the marriage license. Responses from all parties were due on April 13, 2015. In April 2016, the Texas Supreme Court dismissed Paxton's effort to void the marriage.

== Developments after legalization ==
In December 2019, the Texas Commission on Judicial Conduct issued a public warning to a justice of the peace from Waco, Dianne Hensley, who, in violation of her oath of office, had refused to perform marriage ceremonies for same-sex couples while continuing to do so for opposite-sex couples. The commission stated that Hensley must either marry all couples regardless of gender or none, and that she was violating the Texas Code of Judicial Conduct by "casting doubt on her capacity to act impartially to persons appearing before her as a judge due to the person's sexual orientation". Hensley filed a lawsuit, Hensley v. State Commission on Judicial Conduct, in the 459th State District Court in Travis County. It cited the Religious Freedom Restoration Act, but was dismissed in June 2021. However, in June 2024, the Texas Supreme Court ruled that Hensley could pursue her lawsuit. The commission then withdrew its warning against Hensley in September, suggesting that doing so might moot Hensley, but her lawyers disagreed. They pointed out that the commission had not stated a general rule that Texas judges "may lawfully choose to officiate only at opposite-sex weddings without fear of discipline". On October 24, 2025, the Texas Supreme Court ruled that judges can "publicly refrain from performing a wedding ceremony based upon a sincerely held religious belief." In December, Hensley filed a new lawsuit in federal court seeking to overturn Obergefell, arguing that the decision "subordinat[ed] state law to the policy preferences of unelected judges." In 2026, Chief Justice-elect Maggie Ellis opined that the 2025 ruling validating religious opposition should be repealed.

== Native American nations ==
The Indian Civil Rights Act primarily aims to protect the rights of Native Americans but also reinforces the principle of tribal self-governance. While it does not grant sovereignty, the Act affirms the authority of tribes to govern their own legal affairs. Consequently, many tribes in Texas have enacted their own marriage and family laws. As a result, the Supreme Court's Obergefell ruling did not automatically apply to tribal jurisdictions. There are three federally recognized Native American tribes in Texas: the Alabama–Coushatta Tribe of Texas, the Kickapoo Traditional Tribe of Texas (KTTT), and the Ysleta del Sur Pueblo; none of which have legalized same-sex marriage. The Tribal Code of the Alabama–Coushatta Tribe states that "a valid marriage shall be between a man and a woman licensed, solemnized, and registered as provided herein." Marriage licenses (Alabama: itaafoloilka iⁿholisso; Koasati: anáɬka na:sincá:ka) are issued by the Clerk of the Court in "the absence of any showing that the proposed marriage would be invalid under any provision of this part or tribal custom, and upon written application of an unmarried male and unmarried female". The domestic relationships chapter of the Tribal Codes of the Kickapoo Tribe states: "Marriage shall mean a consent relationship between a man and a woman that becomes a civil contract if entered into by two people capable of making the contract. Consent alone does not constitute a marriage. A conventional marriage relies upon the issuance of a license and the issuance of a marriage certificate as authorized by this Chapter. A common-law marriage has no documentary requirements." However, the code also states that marriages validly entered into in another jurisdiction are valid on their reservation: "All marriages performed other than as provided for in this Chapter, which are valid under the laws of the jurisdiction where and when performed, are valid within the jurisdiction of the KTTT."

Native Americans have deep-rooted marriage traditions, placing a strong emphasis on community, family and spiritual connections. While there are no records of same-sex marriages being performed in Native American cultures in the way they are commonly defined in Western legal systems, many Indigenous communities recognize identities and relationships that may be placed on the LGBT spectrum. Among these are two-spirit individuals—people who embody both masculine and feminine qualities. In some cultures, two-spirit individuals assigned male at birth wear women's clothing and engage in household and artistic work associated with the feminine sphere. Historically, this identity sometimes allowed for unions between two people of the same biological sex. The Karankawa, extinct since the late 19th century, referred to these individuals as monaguia. The monaguia generally took on women's tasks and activities in the community, while also playing a special role in religious rites. According to Álvar Núñez Cabeza de Vaca, they "dressed as women and perform[ed] the office of women, but use[d] the bow and carr[ied] big loads". They accompanied the warriors on raiding expeditions to be their sexual partners, to care for the wounded and to look after the stolen horses. The Lipan Apache refer to them as ndé isdzáné (pronounced [ⁿdé ìstsáné]), and the Alabama as aatinaani tayyihahókkìita.

== Demographics and marriage statistics ==
Data from the 2000 U.S. census showed that 42,912 same-sex couples were living in Texas. By 2005, this had increased to 49,423 couples, likely attributed to same-sex couples' growing willingness to disclose their partnerships on government surveys. Same-sex couples lived in all counties of the state, except Kenedy, Loving and Roberts, and constituted 1.0% of coupled households and 0.6% of all households in the state. Most couples lived in Harris, Dallas and Travis counties, but the counties with the highest percentage of same-sex couples were Culberson (1.05% of all county households) and Presidio (1.03%). Same-sex partners in Texas were on average younger than opposite-sex partners, and more likely to be employed. In addition, the average and median household incomes of same-sex couples were higher than different-sex couples, but same-sex couples were far less likely to own a home than opposite-sex partners. 20% of same-sex couples in Texas were raising children under the age of 18, with an estimated 17,444 children living in households headed by same-sex couples in 2005.

According to the Texas Department of State Health Services, approximately 2,500 same-sex couples had married in Texas by September 2015, accounting for about 6% of all marriages performed in the state in that time. Most marriage licenses were issued in Harris, Travis, and Tarrant counties. By June 2016, 248 same-sex couples had married in El Paso County.

The 2020 U.S. census showed that there were 54,504 married same-sex couple households (24,709 male couples and 29,795 female couples) and 42,077 unmarried same-sex couple households in Texas.

== Public opinion ==
Public opinion of same-sex marriage in Texas
Poll source	Dates administered	Sample size	Margin of error	Support	Opposition	Do not know / refused
Public Religion Research Institute	February 28 – December 8, 2025	1,626 adults	?	59%	38%	3%
Public Religion Research Institute	March 13 – December 2, 2024	1,562 adults	?	61%	35%	4%
Public Religion Research Institute	March 9 – December 7, 2023	1,623 adults	?	62%	36%	2%
Public Religion Research Institute	March 11 – December 14, 2022	?	?	62%	36%	2%
Public Religion Research Institute	March 8 – November 9, 2021	?	?	62%	35%	3%
Public Religion Research Institute	January 7 – December 20, 2020	3,440 adults	?	68%	24%	8%
Public Religion Research Institute	April 5 – December 23, 2017	4,944 adults	?	55%	34%	11%
Texas Tech University	March 20 – April 13, 2017	442 registered voters	± 4.6%	64%	28%	8%
Public Religion Research Institute	May 18, 2016 – January 10, 2017	6,956 adults	?	50%	39%	11%
Public Religion Research Institute	April 29, 2015 – January 7, 2016	2,782 adults	?	46%	45%	9%
University of Texas/Texas Tribune	October 30 – November 8, 2015	1,200 adults	± 2.8%	43%	43%	14%
Texas Lyceum	September 8–21, 2015	1,000 adults	± 3.1%	49%	40%	11%
University of Texas/Texas Tribune	June 5–14, 2015	1,200 adults	± 2.8%	44%	41%	15%
Public Religion Research Institute	April 2, 2014 – January 4, 2015	3,575 adults	?	48%	43%	9%
University of Texas/Texas Tribune	October 10–19, 2014	1,200 adults	± 4.0%	42%	47%	11%
New York Times/CBS News/YouGov	September 20 – October 1, 2014	4,177 voters	± 2.2%	37%	50%	13%
Texas Tech	March 6 – April 3, 2014	454 registered voters	± 4.6%	48%	47%	5%
Public Religion Research Institute	November 12 – December 18, 2013	297 adults	± 6.6%	48%	49%	3%
Public Policy Polling	June 28 – July 1, 2013	500 voters	± 4.4%	34%	57%	9%
Glengariff Group, Inc.	January 24–27, 2013	1,000 registered voters	± 3.1%	48%	48%	4%
Public Policy Polling	January 24–27, 2013	500 voters	± 4.4%	35%	55%	10%
Public Policy Polling	September 15–18, 2011	569 voters	± 4.1%	29%	61%	10%
Glengariff Group, Inc.	August 29 – September 2, 2010	1,000 registered voters	± 3.1%	43%	53%	4%
University of North Texas	2003	?	?	?	63%	?

== See also ==
- LGBT rights in Texas
- Recognition of same-sex unions in Texas
- Status of same-sex marriage
- Timeline of same-sex marriage
- Same-sex marriage in the United States
