= Domestic partnership in Texas =

The U.S. state of Texas issues marriage licenses to same-sex couples and recognizes those marriages when performed out-of-state. On June 26, 2015, the United States legalized same-sex marriage nationwide due to the U.S. Supreme Court's decision in Obergefell v. Hodges. Prior to the U.S. Supreme Court's ruling Article 1, Section 32, of the Texas Constitution provided that "Marriage in this state shall consist only of the union of one man and one woman," and "This state or a political subdivision of this state may not create or recognize any legal status identical or similar to marriage." This amendment and all related statutes have been ruled unconstitutional and unenforceable. Some cities and counties in the state recognize both same-sex and opposite-sex domestic partnerships.

== Domestic partnerships ==
Same sex marriages are recognized throughout the state since 2015. Currently there is no recognition of domestic partnerships at the statewide level in Texas for either same-sex or opposite-sex couples.

=== Domestic partner benefits provided by governmental entities ===
Map of Texas counties and cities that offer domestic partner benefits either county-wide or in particular cities. City offers domestic partner benefits County-wide partner benefits through domestic partnership County or city does not offer domestic partner benefits

==== Travis County ====
Since January 1991, the Travis County has maintained a registry for domestic partnerships. It is the first county in Texas to recognize domestic partnerships.

==== Austin ====
On September 2, 1993, the Austin City Council voted 5–2 in favor of the city offering domestic partner benefits. In January 1994, domestic partnerships became available in Austin, becoming the first city in Texas to do so. A group named Concerned Texans, led by the Rev. Charles Bullock, led a petition drive, called Proposition 22. On May 7, 1994, Proposition 22 passed, with a margin of 62 percent in favor to 38 percent against. It amended Austin's city charter to prohibit domestic partners, which were effectively terminated on May 9, 1994.

On May 13, 2006, Austin voters passed, by a vote of 68 percent in favor to 32 percent against, Proposition 2, which amended the city charter to restore domestic partner benefits for city employees.

==== Dallas ====
Since 2004, the city of Dallas has offered domestic partnership benefits to city employees.

==== El Paso ====
On August 25, 2009, the El Paso City Council voted 7-1 to grant domestic partnership benefits to city employees. A group, called Traditional Family Values, led by the Rev. Tom Brown, led a petition drive to repeal the city's domestic partnership benefits. The proposition was criticized for its poorly worded language on the ballot. On November 2, 2010, the proposition passed, with a margin of 55 percent in favor to 45 percent against. It amended El Paso's city charter to prohibit domestic partners, which were effectively terminated on January 1, 2011. On November 16, 2010, the El Paso City Council voted 4–3 against rescinding the public referendum prohibiting domestic partnerships in the city.

On May 14, 2011, the El Paso City Council voted 4-4 on restoring domestic partnerships in the city. Mayor John Cook casts the tie breaking vote in favor of restoring domestic partnerships, which restored domestic partner benefits for city employees.

==== Fort Worth ====
On January 1, 2011, domestic partnership benefits of city employees of Fort Worth began.

==== San Antonio ====
On September 15, 2011, the San Antonio City Council voted 8-3 to grant domestic partnership benefits to city employees. It took effect on October 1, 2011.

==== El Paso County ====
On August 13, 2012, the El Paso County Commissioners Court voted 3-1 to grant domestic partnership benefits to county employees.

==== Dallas County ====
On October 30, 2012, the Dallas County Commissioners Court voted 3-2 to grant domestic partnership benefits to city employees. It took effect on January 1, 2013.

==== Houston ====
On November 6, 2001, 52 percent of Houston voters approved Proposition 2, an amendment to the city charter prohibiting the city from providing domestic partner benefits for city employees. The amendment however specifically permits benefits to be provided to "legal spouses" of employees. On November 20, 2013, Mayor Annise Parker announced that the city will begin offering domestic partnerships benefits to all legally married spouses of city employees. This will apply to same-sex couples who have been married in a state where same-sex marriage is legal. The mayor's decision is based on a city legal department interpretation of recent U.S. Supreme Court decisions and other relevant case law from the around the country. On December 17, 2013, State District Judge Lisa Millard issued an order to put on hold the implementation of Houston's domestic partnership law, in response to a lawsuit filed by Harris County GOP chairman Jared Woodfill, on behalf of plaintiffs Jack Pidgeon and Larry Hicks. It is pending a hearing on January 6, 2014.

==== Bexar County ====
In June 1999, a gay rights activist asked Bexar County officials to establish a legal registry for those who want to declare themselves same-sex domestic partners. County officials sought a ruling from Texas Attorney General John Cornyn, who responded that such declarations constituted an attempt to establish a legal relationship similar to marriage, a violation of Texas law. Bexar County denied the request in December.

On February 4, 2014, Bexar County Commissioners Court voted 5–0 in favor of allowing county employee benefits to be extended to domestic partners.

=== 2013 Texas attorney general opinion ===
In April 2013, Texas Attorney General Greg Abbott opined that Article I, Section 32 of the Texas Constitution prohibits a political subdivision of the state from "creating a legal status of domestic partnership and recognizing that status by offering public benefits based upon it." The opinion request from state Senator Dan Patrick inquired about political subdivisions that "offer some form of insurance benefits to domestic partnerships" as part of their employee benefit programs. Article I, Section 32 says that "[t]his state or a political subdivision of this state may not create or recognize any legal status identical or similar to marriage." The attorney general said that a city, county, or independent school district is a "political subdivision" for this purpose. He also said, "By establishing eligibility criteria and requiring affidavits and other legal documentation to demonstrate applicants' eligibility to be considered domestic partners, ... political subdivisions have purported to create a legal status of domestic partnership that is not otherwise recognized under Texas law. Furthermore, the political subdivisions 'recognize' that legal status by providing benefits to individuals who attain that status." As for whether the domestic partnerships are "similar" to marriage, the attorney general said "a court is likely to conclude that the domestic partnership legal status ... is 'similar to marriage' and therefore barred" by the constitution.

In response, the Austin Independent School District decided not to offer health benefits to the domestic partners of its employees. However, the Austin Independent School District changed its position in August 2013, and has moved forward to offer health benefits to domestic partners of employees. City Manager Marc Ott and Mayor Lee Leffingwell of the City of Austin said that the city would not change its domestic partners benefits policy. Sam Biscoe, the county judge of Travis County, said that the county would not change its policy because, "Legally, we are in good shape." A spokesperson for Fort Worth said the city did not expect any problems from the opinion because "Our domestic partner policy does not say anything about marriage or gender." El Paso mayor John Cook said, "The attorney general's opinion is nothing but that - it's an opinion that doesn't have the enforcement of a court case." Veronica Escobar, the county judge of El Paso County, said that the opinion was not binding and that the county would continue to provide benefits to the unmarried partners of its employees.

== History ==
=== Statute ===
In 1997, the Texas legislature prohibited the issuance of marriage licenses to same-sex couples. In 2003, the legislature enacted a statute that made void in Texas any same-sex marriage or civil union. This statute also prohibits the state or any agency or political subdivision of the state from giving effect to same-sex marriages or civil unions performed in other jurisdictions.

During the legislature's 2013 regular session, House Bill 1300 by Representative Lon Burnam would have repealed the same-sex marriage prohibition; however, the bill died in the State Affairs committee of the house of representatives. Senate Bill 480 by Senator Juan Hinojosa would have repealed only the civil union prohibition; however, this bill also died in committee.

=== Constitution ===
On November 8, 2005, Texas voters approved Texas Proposition 2 that amended the state constitution to define marriage as consisting "only of the union of one man and one woman" and prohibiting the state or any political subdivision of the state from creating or recognizing "any legal status identical or similar to marriage."

During the legislature's 2013 regular session, House Joint Resolution 77 by Representative Rafael Anchia, House Joint Resolution 78 by Representative Garnet Coleman, and Senate Joint Resolution 29 by Senator José R. Rodríguez would have repealed the constitutional definition of marriage; however, all these resolutions died in their respective committees.

=== Federal lawsuit ===
In November 2013, two same-sex couples challenged the state's same-sex marriage ban in U.S. District Court, which ruled in their favor on February 26, 2014, while staying enforcement of its ruling pending appeal. The state has appealed the decision to the Fifth Circuit Court of Appeals.

=== State lawsuits ===
==== Divorce for same-sex couples ====
===== In the Matter of the Marriage of A.L.F.L. and K.L.L. =====
On February 18, 2014, a same-sex couple, married in Washington D.C., filed for divorce and child custody lawsuit. On April 23, 2014, Judge Barbara Nellermoe, of the 45th Judicial District Court of Bexar County, ruled that three portions of the Texas Family Code, as well as Section 32 of the Texas Constitution, were unconstitutional. On April 25, 2014, Texas Attorney General Greg Abbott appealed the decision. On May 15, 2014, Judge Nellermoe rejected a push by state officials to block a same-sex couple's divorce and child-custody case from proceeding. She also set a May 29 custody hearing in San Antonio for the fight between the couple over custody of their daughter.

===== In Re Marriage of J.B. and H.B. =====
In 2009, a same-sex couple that had married in Massachusetts filed for divorce in Dallas, but before the district court could grant the divorce the Texas Attorney General intervened and challenged the court's jurisdiction to do so. On October 2, 2009, the district court ruled, in the case of In Re Marriage of J.B. and H.B. that, to the extent Texas laws purported to prevent two men who were legally married in Massachusetts from getting a divorce in Texas, those laws were unconstitutional. But the Texas Attorney General appealed, and on August 31, 2010, the Fifth Court of Appeals in Dallas reversed the lower court, ruling that the same-sex marriage ban does not violate the Equal Protection Clause of the Fourteenth Amendment, even when used to prevent a legally-married couple from obtaining a divorce.

The case is pending before the Texas Supreme Court, with oral arguments set for November 5, 2013.

===== Texas v. Naylor =====
In Austin, another same-sex couple married in Massachusetts filed for divorce, and the district court actually granted the divorce before the Attorney General could intervene. The Attorney General appealed that decision too, but on January 7, 2011, the Third Court of Appeals in Austin, in the case of Texas v. Naylor held that the state had no right to intervene in the case, to challenge the divorce on appeal.

The case is pending before the Texas Supreme Court. Oral arguments took place November 5, 2013.

== Public opinion ==
Support for same-sex marriage
When	Organizer	Support	Oppose	Not sure	Sample size	Margin of error
August / September 2010	Glengariff Group, Inc.	42.7%	52.7%		1,000 registered voters	±3.1%
September 2011	Public Policy Polling	29%	61%	10%	569 residents	±4.10%
January 2013	Public Policy Polling	35%	55%	10%	500 voters	±4.4%
January 2013	Glengariff Group, Inc.	47.9%	47.5%		1,000 registered voters	±3.1%
June/July 2013	Public Policy Polling	34%	57%	9%	500 registered voters	±4.4%
December 2013	Public Religion Research Institute	48%	49%	4%	297 registered voters	±6.6%

Support for legal recognition of same-sex relationships
When	Organizer	Same-sex marriage	Civil union	No legal recognition	Unsure	Sample size	Margin of error
June 2009	University of Texas	29%	32%	32%	8%	924 residents	±3.22%
June 2009	Texas Lyceum	32%	25%	36%	7%	860 residents	Unknown
February 2010	University of Texas	28%	35%	30%	7%	800 registered voters	±3.46%
September 2010	Texas Lyceum	28%	24%	40%	9%	725 residents	Unknown
May 2011	University of Texas	30%	31%	33%	6%	800 registered voters	±3.46%
September 2011	Public Policy Polling	24%	35%	40%	1%	569 residents	±4.10%
February 2012	University of Texas	31%	29%	33%	7%	800 registered voters	±3.46%
October 2012	University of Texas	36%	33%	25%	7%	800 registered voters	±3.46%
January 2013	Public Policy Polling	33%	28%	36%	3%	500 voters	±4.4%
February 2013	University of Texas	37%	28%	28%	7%	800 registered voters	±3.46%
June 2013	University of Texas	39%	30%	26%	5%	1,200 registered voters	±2.83%
June/July 2013	Public Policy Polling	31%	32%	31%	6%	500 voters	±4.4%
February 2014	American National Election Studies	32%	37%	31%	-	?	?

Since 2009, Texans between the ages of 18 and 29 have increasingly supported same-sex marriage at a faster rate than that of the general population. In June 2009, the University of Texas found that 49 percent of that age group supported same-sex marriage as opposed to 29 percent of the general population. In February 2013, it found that 59 percent of them did so while only 37 percent of the general population had the same opinion. Opposition from Texans between the ages of 18 and 29 dropped 12 points in the same period, from 28 to 16 percent. At the same time, opposition from the general population in Texan dropped 5 points, from 52.7 percent to 47.5 percent. Glengariff Group, Inc., in conjunction with the pro-LGBT rights Equality Texas Foundation, found that support in that age group rose from 53.6 percent in 2010 to 67.9 percent in 2013 while within the general population in Texas, support rose from 42.7 percent to 47.9 percent.

== See also ==
- LGBT rights in Texas
- Same-sex marriage
- Same-sex marriage in Texas
- Same-sex relationship
