= LGBTQ history in Texas =

History of LGBTQ-related events in Texas, United States

The state of Texas, located in the south in the United States, contains a large community of LGBTQ+ citizens. More specifically, the city Austin, Texas has the third largest population of LGBTQ+ people based on the size of the city. Austin, Texas, and Texas in general, is home to several icons of the LGBTQ+ community such as Karamo Brown, co-founder of the LGBTQ+ group "Queer Eye" and Demi Lovato, a queer artist and activist. There is history of heavy violence against the LGBTQ+ community within Texas such as riots, as well as liberation and parades celebrating those within the community.

== 20th century ==
=== 1972–2000 ===
In 1972, an LGBTQ+ couple was denied the right to marriage. During this year, it was illegal, but it was uncommon and deemed inappropriate and then denied by the state. In 1973, same-sex marriage was then deemed as illegal, and marriage licenses could only be issued to couples who were of a man and a woman. In 1975, the Houston GLBT Political Caucus, the oldest southern LGBT rights organization is founded. In 1979, Houston Gay Pride Parade was first held in Neartown, Houston. The Texas Democratic Party added certain LGBTQ+ rights to the party's platform in 1980. The 1984 federal Supreme Court decision in Gay Student Services v. Texas A&M University upheld the requirement for public universities to uphold the First Amendment rights of students. In 1986, Baker v. Wade resulted in a short-lived blow against Texas' sodomy law. This was ultimately overturned in the same year by Bowers v. Hardwick, a Georgia federal case which criminalized sodomy as a non-private act, and SCOTUS refused to hear appeal regarding Baker v Wade. In 1997, the Texas legislature prohibited the issuance of marriage licenses to same-sex couples. The 1999 state Supreme Court case Littleton v. Prange annulled transsexual marriages in the state.

== 21st century ==
In 2001, Governor Rick Perry signed the James Byrd Jr. Hate Crimes Act, which criminalized violent or coercive action against other Texas residents on various immutable traits, including sexual orientation. Gender identity was not included in this legislation. The 2003 landmark decision by the Supreme Court of the United States in Lawrence v. Texas nullified all remaining sodomy laws in the United States. However, Texas Penal Code § 21.06 is retained without legal effect. Perry criticized the decision and called the sodomy law "appropriate". In 2003, the legislature enacted a statute that made void in Texas any same-sex marriage or civil union. This statute also prohibits the state or any agency or political subdivision of the state from giving effect to same-sex marriages or civil unions performed in other jurisdictions. On November 8, 2005, Texas voters approved a proposition that amended the state constitution to define marriage as consisting "only of the union of one man and one woman" and prohibiting the state or any political subdivision of the state from creating or recognizing "any legal status identical or similar to marriage."

In the 2006 election, independent gubernatorial candidate Kinky Friedman becomes one of the first candidates for the office to indicate same-sex marriage rights in Texas, saying "I support gay marriage. I believe they have a right to be as miserable as the rest of us." In 2009, Houston City Comptroller Annise Parker was elected the first openly lesbian mayor of a major city in Texas. On October 2, 2009, a Texas district court judge in the case of In Re Marriage of J.B. and H.B. granted a divorce to two men married in Massachusetts, ruling unconstitutional the state's same-sex marriage ban. On August 31, 2010, the Fifth Court of Appeals in Dallas reversed the lower court, ruling, among other things, that the same-sex marriage ban does not violate the Equal Protection Clause of the Fourteenth Amendment.

On January 7, 2011, the Third Court of Appeals in Austin in the case of State of Texas v. Angelique S. Naylor and Sabina Daly rejected, on procedural grounds, the Texas attorney general's appeal of a divorce granted by a lower court to a same-sex couple married in Massachusetts. Both cases are pending before the Texas Supreme Court. In 2012, after Obama's endorsement of same sex marriage, the Texas Democratic Party became the first southern Democratic state party to include support of same-sex marriage in its platform. In 2015, same-sex marriage was legalized throughout the United States. In Texas specifically, 2,500 same-sex marriage licenses were issued in the state that year. In 2021, Governor Greg Abbott signed a House Bill stating that if students are to play sports in the state of Texas, they have to be on the team that is of the gender they were assigned at birth.

== See also ==
- LGBT rights in Texas
