= De Leon v. Perry =

- No. 5:13-cv-982
- Court: United States Court of Appeals for the Fifth Circuit
- Full case name: Cleopatra de Leon, et al., Plaintiffs, v. Rick Perry, in his official capacity as Governor of Texas, et al. Defendants.

Case history
- Prior actions: Judge Orlando Luis Garcia, W.D. Tex., struck down Texas' ban on same-sex marriage.

Holding
- Texas's ban on same-sex marriage violates the Fourteenth Amendment per Obergefell v. Hodges.

Court membership
- Judges sitting: Patrick Higginbotham, Jerry Edwin Smith, James E. Graves, Jr.

Case opinions
- Majority: Smith, joined by Higginbotham, Graves

Keywords
- Marriage, Equal Protection, Same-sex marriage, Sexual Orientation

De Leon v. Perry was a federal lawsuit challenging Texas marriage law, specifically the state's constitutional ban on same-sex marriage and corresponding statutes. A U.S. district court ruled in favor of the plaintiff same-sex couples on February 26, 2014, granting their motion for a preliminary injunction. The state defendants filed an interlocutory appeal before the United States Court of Appeals for the Fifth Circuit, as the disposition on the motion was not a final ruling in the case. On April 14, 2014, the plaintiffs filed a motion for an expedited hearing, which was denied on May 21, 2014. The plaintiffs filed another motion for an expedited hearing on October 6, 2014, after the Supreme Court of the United States denied appeals in other marriage equality cases, and the motion was granted on October 7, 2014, setting a hearing for November 2014. However, on October 27, 2014, the Fifth Circuit set oral arguments for January 9, 2015.

The Fifth Circuit heard oral argument on January 9, 2015. The case was still pending in the Fifth Circuit when the U.S. Supreme Court ruled on June 26, 2015, in Obergefell v. Hodges that the denial of marriage rights to same-sex couples is unconstitutional. On July 1, the Fifth Circuit affirmed the district court judgment in favor of the plaintiffs.

== Background ==
Article I, Section 32 of the Constitution of Texas, added via referendum as Proposition 2 on November 8, 2005, specifically banned same-sex marriage by definition: "Marriage in this state shall consist only of the union of one man and one woman."

Plaintiffs in the case are Mark Phariss and Victor ("Vic") Holmes, then an unmarried gay couple who wished to marry in-state, and Nicole Dimetman and Cleopatra De Leon, a lesbian couple lawfully married in Massachusetts wanting in-state recognition of that marriage. The lead named plaintiff, Cleopatra De Leon, is a U.S. Air Force and Texas Air National Guard veteran, and in a committed relationship with her wife for 12 years at the time of the filing of the suit. Victor Holmes, a retired United States Air Force major who served almost 23 years, and Mark Phariss, a corporate attorney, were in a committed relationship for 16 years at the time of the filing of the lawsuit. On the other end, the lead named defendant is Rick Perry, sued in his official capacity as the Governor of Texas.

== U.S. district court action ==
On October 28, 2013, the plaintiffs filed suit in U.S. district court, challenging the Texas' same-sex marriage ban. The case was assigned to Federal District Judge Orlando Garcia.

The district judge heard oral arguments on February 12, 2014, forecasting that the issue of same-sex marriage "will make its way to the Supreme Court". Arguing for the state, Assistant Texas Solicitor General Mike Murphy said: "The purpose of Texas marriage law is not to discriminate against same-sex couples but to promote responsible procreation" and that a heterosexual couple provides the best environment for childrearing.

On February 26, Garcia ruled against Texas' ban on same-sex marriage, writing that "Texas' current marriage laws deny homosexual couples the right to marry, and in doing so, demean their dignity for no legitimate reason". Garcia agreed with the plaintiffs' argument that homosexuals are a suspect class entitled to a more exacting standard of review, heightened scrutiny, but found that the state's arguments fail "even under the most deferential rational basis level of review" regarding equal protection. Regarding due process and the denial of a fundamental right, he wrote that the state's ban must be reviewed under the strict scrutiny standard. He ruled that the state has "failed to identify any rational, much less a compelling, reason that is served by denying same-sex couples the fundamental right to marry". He stayed enforcement of his ruling pending appeal to the Fifth Circuit Court of Appeals.

== U.S. Court of Appeals action ==
Attorney General Greg Abbott said the state would appeal the decision. Governor Rick Perry said: "The 10th Amendment guarantees Texas voters the freedom to make these decisions, and this is yet another attempt to achieve via the courts what couldn't be achieved at the ballot box. We will continue to fight for the rights of Texans to self-determine the laws of our state." On November 24, the plaintiffs asked the district court to lift its stay, noting that the U.S. Supreme Court has denied stays in similar cases and dissolved stays by denying cert in several more. The district court denied that request on December 12. The Fifth Circuit heard oral argument on January 9, 2015, before Judges Patrick E. Higginbotham, Jerry E. Smith, and James E. Graves, Jr.

On February 12, the plaintiffs asked the Fifth Circuit to lift the stay, citing the refusal of the U.S. Supreme to extend stays in similar Alabama and Florida cases, or at the least lift the stay with respect to plaintiffs De Leon and Dimetman, who expected the birth of their child on March 15 and sought to avoid the adoption process.

The case and the motion to lift the stay was still pending in the Fifth Circuit when the U.S. Supreme Court ruled on June 26, 2015, in Obergefell v. Hodges that the denial of marriage rights to same-sex couples is unconstitutional. On July 1, the Fifth Circuit affirmed the district court judgment in favor of the plaintiffs. The ruling of the Fifth Circuit Court required Judge Garcia of the District Court to enter his final judgment on the case by July 17, 2015.

Pursuant to the Fifth Circuit's order, the district court entered a final judgment on July 7, 2015, permanently enjoining the State of Texas from enforcing any laws prohibiting any same-sex marriage. Subsequently, in December 2015, the district court awarded more than $605,000 in legal fees and costs to the plaintiffs' law firm, Akin Gump Strauss Hauer & Feld. The Fifth Circuit affirmed the award of legal fees in a 2-1 per curiam decision on April 18, 2017.

== Post-decision ==
The plaintiffs, Mark Phariss and Vic Holmes, were later married on November 21, 2015, in Frisco, Texas, at the Westin Stonebriar Hotel after more than 18 years together by former Congressman Charles A. Gonzalez. A book about them titled The Accidental Activists: Mark Phariss, Vic Holmes, and Their Fight for Marriage Equality in Texas by David Collins and published by the University North Texas Press was released in July 2017.

== See also ==
- Same-sex marriage in Texas
- LGBT rights in Texas
