= Defense of Marriage Act (Texas) =

2003 law in the U.S. state of Texas

The Texas Defence of Marriage Act is an act that specifies that US State of Texas does not recognise same-sex marriage or civil union.

The statute was enacted in 2003, it made void in Texas any same-sex marriage or civil union. This statute also prohibits the state or any agency or political subdivision of the state from giving effect to same-sex marriages or civil unions performed in other jurisdictions.

The act was signed by Governor Rick Perry in 2003.

Subsequently Texas Proposition 2 (2005) wrote similar restrictions into the state constitution.

Early appeals based on the unconstitutionality of the restrictions have been lost, or lost on appeal.

On 26 February 2014 San Antonio-based Judge Orlando Garcia struck down the Texas state ban on same sex marriage stating that the "current prohibition has no legitimate governmental purpose." A stay has been granted awaiting appeal.

== See also ==
- LGBT history in Texas
- Same-sex marriage law in the United States by state
