= Equality Texas =

US LGBTQ advocacy organization

- The Equality Texas logo

- U.S. State of Texas
- Founded: 1989
- Location: Austin, Texas
- Region served: Texas
- Key people: Angela Hale, acting executive director
- Website: equalitytexas.org

Equality Texas is a statewide political advocacy organization in Texas that advocates for lesbian, gay, bisexual, and transgender (LGBTQ) rights, including same-sex marriage.

== History ==
Equality Texas was founded in 1989 as a 501(c)(4) nonprofit corporation. Equality Texas Foundation was founded in 1990 as a 501(c)(3) nonprofit corporation.

== Structure ==
Equality Texas comprises Equality Texas Foundation, a 501(c)(3) nonprofit corporation engaged in research and public education on LGBT issues, and Equality Texas, a 501(c)(4) nonprofit corporation engaged in statewide political LGBT advocacy.

== Programs ==
Equality Texas programs currently active include:

The Equality Poll
Public polling on state of LGBT issues in Texas.

Safe Schools Initiative
A public policy campaign advocating for changes in the Texas Education Code dealing with bullying and harassment.

Equality Project
A public education program on LGBT policy issues and their effect on Texas citizens.

Why Marriage Matters Texas
A program with Freedom to Marry working to legalize same-sex marriage in Texas. The program was launched in early 2014.

Pride in Faith
A public forum for open discussion about the intersection of faith and sexual identity.

Equality Is Good For Business
Public education campaign on major employers in Texas that have adopted LGBT-inclusive non-discrimination policies.

== See also ==
- LGBT rights in Texas
- Recognition of same-sex unions in Texas
- List of LGBT rights organizations
