= Robert M. Stein =

American political scientist (1950–2025)

Robert M. Stein (July 10, 1950 – July 18, 2025) was an American political scientist and Lena Gohlman Fox Professor of political science at Rice University. He was an expert in urban politics and public policy.

Stein co-authored Perpetuating the Pork Barrel: Policy Subsystems and American Democracy (1995, Cambridge University Press) and authored Urban Alternatives: Public and Private Markets in the Provision of Local Services (1990, Pittsburgh Press).

== Life and career ==
Stein was born in New York City on July 10, 1950. After graduation from Ohio Wesleyan University in 1972, he pursued graduate study at University of Wisconsin–Milwaukee and obtained M.A. and PhD degrees in 1974 and 1977, respectively.

Before joining Rice University, Stein taught at University of Georgia for a short time. At Rice University, he served as Department Chair of Political Science and Dean of School of Social Sciences, among other appointments. He was Lena Gohlman Fox Professor of Political Science beginning in 1996.

Stein was also an editorial board member of American Political Science Review, American Journal of Political Science, Journal of Politics, Social Science Quarterly, State and Local Government Review and Urban Affairs Review.

Stein died from cancer at his home in Houston, Texas on July 18, 2025, at the age of 75.

== Awards ==
- Best paper award on Federalism and Intergovernmental Relations for "Inter-Local Cooperation and the Distribution of Federal Grants," by the section on Federalism and Intergovernmental Relations, American Political Science Association, 2004 (with Kenneth Bickers)
- President, Urban Politics Subsection, American Political Science Association, 1999-2000.
- President, Southwestern Political Science Association, 1998.
- Special book award from the Urban Politics and Policy Section of the American Political Science Association for, Urban Alternatives: Private and Public Markets in the Provision of Local Services, 1991.
- Fellowship, U.S. Advisory Commission on Intergovernmental Relations, 1978-1979.

== Grants ==
- Independent Response of Complex Urban Infrastructures Subjected to Multiple Hazards, National Science Foundation, October 2007 – October 2010
- The Changing Structure of Federal Aid and the Politics of the Electoral Connection. Funded by the National Science Foundation 2001-2002. SES0095997 Co-PI, 2001-2003.
- Selective Universalization of Domestic Public Policy. Funded by the National Science Foundation(SES8921109) 1990-1992.
- Contracting for Municipal Services. Funded by the U.S. Advisory Commission on Intergovernmental Relations. January 1986-1990.
- The Fiscal Austerity and Urban Innovation. Funded by the U.S. Department of Housing and Urban Development. September 1983-1985.
- The Structural Character of Federal Grants-in-Aid. Funded by the U.S. Department of Housing and Urban Development. 1982-83.
- The Allocation of Federal Grants-in-Aid. Funded by the U.S. Advisory Commission on Intergovernmental Relations. 1979-1981.
- The Allocation of State-Local Aid: An Examination of Within State Variation. Funded by the U.S. Advisory Commission on Intergovernmental Relations. 1979-1981.

== Selected publications ==
=== Books ===
- Perpetuating the Pork Barrel: Policy Subsystems and American Democracy. Cambridge University Press. 1995. ISBN 978-0-517-51897-7.(with Kenneth N. Bickers)
- Federal Domestic Outlays 1983-1990. M.E. Sharp. 1991. ISBN 978-0-87332-840-1. (with Kenneth N. Bickers)
- Urban Alternatives: Public and Private Markets in the Provision of Local Services. Pittsburgh Press. 1990. ISBN 0-19-508275-3.

=== Articles ===
- "Voting technology, election administration and voter performance", Election Law Journal, 7:123–135 (April 2008) with Greg Vonnahme, Michael Byrne and Daniel Wallach.
- "Engaging the unengaged voter: Voter centers and voter turnout", Journal of Politics. 2:487–497 (April 2008) with Greg Vonnahme.
- "Assessing the Micro-Foundations of the Tiebout Model", Urban Affairs Review, 42:57–80 (September 2006), with Kenneth Bickers and Lapo Salucci.
- "Voting for Minority Candidates in Multi-Racial/Ethnic Communities", Urban Affairs Review, 41:157–181 (November 2005) with Stacy Ulbig and Stephanie Post.
- "Inter-Local Cooperation and the Distribution of Federal Grant Awards", Journal of Politics, 66:800–22 (August 2004) with Kenneth Bickers.
- "Language Choice, Residential Stability, and Voting among Latino-Americans", Social Science Quarterly, 84:412–24 (June 2003), with Martin Johnson and Robert Wrinkle.
- "The Congressional Pork Barrel in a Republican Era", Journal of Politics, 62:1070–1086 (November 2000) with Kenneth Bickers.
- "Reconciling Context and Contact Effects on Racial Attitudes", Political Research Quarterly. 53:285–303 (June 2000), with Stephanie Shirley Post and Allison Rinden.
- "The Micro Foundations of the Tiebout Model", Urban Affairs Review 34:76–93 (September 1998) with Kenneth Bickers.
- "Early Voting", Public Opinion Quarterly. 62:57–70 (Spring 1998).
- "Voting Early, But Not Often", Social Science Quarterly 78:657–677 (September 1997) with Patricia Garcia-Monet.
- "The Electoral Dynamics of the Federal Pork Barrel", American Journal of Political Science, 40:1300–1326 (November 1996) with Kenneth Bickers.
- "Explaining State Aid Allocations: Targeting Within Universalism", Social Science Quarterly, 75:524–540 (September 1994) with Keith E. Hamm
- "Congressional Elections and the Pork Barrel", Journal of Politics, 56:377–399 (May 1994) with Kenneth Bickers.
- "Universalism and the Electoral Connection: A Test and Some Doubts", Political Research Quarterly, 47:295–318 (June 1994) with Kenneth N. Bickers.
- "Response to Weingast's 'Reflections on Distributive Politics and Universalism'", Political Research Quarterly: 47:329–334 (June 1994) with Kenneth N. Bickers.
- "Arranging City Services", Journal of Public Administration: Research and Theory 3:66–93 (Spring 1993).
- "The Budgetary Effects of Municipal Service Contracting: A Principal-Agent Explanation", American Journal of Political Science. 34:471–502 (May 1990).
- "Economic Voting for Governor and U.S. Senator: The Electoral Consequences of Federalism", Journal of Politics 52:29–54 (February 1990).
- "Market Maximization of Individual Preferences and Metropolitan Municipal Service Responsibility", Urban Affairs Quarterly 24:86–116 (September 1989).
- "A Comparative Analysis of the Targeting Capacity of State and Federal Intergovernmental Aid Allocations: 1977–1982", Social Science Quarterly (1987). With K. Hamm.
- "Municipal Public Employment: An Examination of Intergovernmental Influences". American Journal of Political Science, 28:636–653 (November 1984).
- "Implementation of Federal Policy: An Extension of the 'Differentiated Theory of Federalism'", Research in Urban Policy, 3:341–348 (1984)
