= Littleton v. Prange =

- Court: Fourth Court of Appeals of Texas
- Full case name: Christie Lee LITTLETON, Individually and as Next Heir of Jonathon Mark Littleton, Appellant, v. Dr. Mark PRANGE, Appellee.
- Decided: October 27, 1999
- Citation: 9 S.W.3d 223

Case opinions
- Decision by: Phil Hardberger

Littleton v. Prange, 9 S.W.3d 223 (1999), is a 1999 lawsuit that voided a marriage where one of the individuals was a transgender woman, Christie Lee Littleton. The Fourth Court of Appeals of Texas ruled that, for purposes of Texas law, Littleton is male, and that her marriage to a man was therefore invalid. Texas law did not recognize same-sex marriage at the time of the ruling.

== Background ==
Christie Lee Cavazos was assigned male at birth, in San Antonio, Texas in 1952. She dropped out of school at age 15 and began living as a woman. In 1977, Cavazos began taking female hormones and legally changed her first name. In 1980, she underwent surgical reassignment and had the requisite state-issued identification changed to female. In 1989 Cavazos married Jonathan Mark Littleton in Kentucky, later moving to San Antonio.

== Case ==
After Jonathan Littleton's death, Christie Littleton brought a medical malpractice suit against her husband's doctor, Mark Prange. The defense attorney argued that the marriage was invalid because Christie was a biological male. On appeal, Chief Justice Phil Hardberger relied on the fact that "Texas statutes do not allow same-sex marriages" and that "male chromosomes do not change with either hormonal treatment or sex reassignment surgery" in handing down his judgment that "Christie Littleton is a male. As a male, Christie cannot be married to another male. Her marriage to Jonathan was invalid, and she cannot bring a cause of action as his surviving spouse."

The decision made it legal for a cis woman to marry a trans woman who had undergone sex reassignment surgery and transitioned to female as long as the two partners were assigned opposite sexes at birth.

== In fiction ==
Littleton v. Prange is cited in the fictional 2010 Drop Dead Diva episode "Queen of Mean". In the episode, lawyers for a post-operative trans woman cite the case to prove that her marriage to a cis woman, entered into before she transitioned, was valid, allowing her to inherit her deceased wife's estate.

== See also ==
- LGBT rights in Texas
- Same-sex marriage in Texas
