= 2005 Texas Proposition 2 =

Referendum to ban same-sex marriage

Proposition 2
- November 8, 2005 (Note: Early voting began on October 24.)
- "The constitutional amendment providing that marriage in this state consists only of the union of one man and one woman and prohibiting this state or a political subdivision of this state from creating or recognizing any legal status identical or similar to marriage."

Results
Choice	Votes	%
Yes	1,723,782	76.25%
No	536,913	23.75%
Total votes	2,260,695	100.00%
Registered voters/turnout	12,577,545	17.97%
County results
Yes
90–100%
80–90%
70–80%
60–70%
50–60%
No
50–60%

2005 Texas Proposition 2 was a ballot measure passed by Texas voters on November 8, 2005. The measure amended the Constitution of Texas to define marriage as between one man and one woman, thereby prohibiting same-sex marriage. The amendment also prohibited the state from creating or recognizing "any legal status identical or similar to marriage." Placed on the ballot by House Joint Resolution 6, the measure was approved with more than 76% of votes cast in favor. Supporters of the amendment included Governor Rick Perry and Attorney General Greg Abbott, while opponents included the National Gay and Lesbian Task Force, as well as numerous newspapers throughout the state.

The constitutionality of Proposition 2 was challenged in court two times in the cases of In re Marriage of J.B. and H.B and De Leon v. Perry; however, same-sex marriage did not become legal in Texas until the United States Supreme Court's June 2015 decision in Obergefell v. Hodges, finding all bans on same-sex marriage to be in violation of two clauses of the Fourteenth Amendment.

== Background ==
In 1973, the Texas state legislature amended its state statute to require marriages to be between "a man and a woman." The change came after a same-sex couple applied for a marriage license the previous year in Wharton County. In 1997, Governor George W. Bush signed into law a change to marriage laws to explicitly prohibit the issuance of a marriage license to a same-sex couple. In 2003, the Texas legislature passed a defense of marriage act, which prohibited the state from recognizing same-sex marriages and civil unions performed in a foreign jurisdiction. Governor Rick Perry signed the bill on May 28 of that year, and it went into effect on September 1.

== Legislative approval ==
=== Debate and proposed changes to HJR 6 ===
House Joint Resolution 6 (HJR 6) placed Proposition 2 on the ballot. Introduced by State Representative Warren Chisum, the proposition originally did not contain a ban on civil unions. However, an amendment to the original resolution, to ban such contracts, was passed by the Texas House 98–41. This amendment to include a ban on civil unions was also authored by Chisum. In the state house, during debate on HJR 6 before it was approved, several legislators introduced amendments to the resolution, ranging from removing the provision banning civil unions, to providing that the amendment did not prohibit any contractual relationship already occurring. In the state senate, amendments ranged from prohibiting the state from recognizing a marriage if one of the individuals to the marriage had previously married three or more times, to stating that a marriage between a man and a woman "must include some sexual intercourse". The latter two were withdrawn before a vote could occur.

=== Provisions of HJR 6 ===
Within HJR 6 were three sections: Section 1, which defined marriage and prohibited civil unions; Section 2, which was not a part of the constitutional amendment, but rather a clause that clarified some of the amendment's intents; and Section 3, which provided the date in which the proposition would be decided as well as the ballot title. Section 2, the non-amendatory provision, stated the following:

This state recognizes that through the designation of guardians, the appointment of agents, and the use of private contracts, persons may adequately and properly appoint guardians and arrange rights relating to hospital visitation, property, and the entitlement to proceeds of life insurance policies without the existence of any legal status identical or similar to marriage.

=== House and Senate approval ===

Democrat yea
Democrat nay
Democrat abstain/no vote
Republican yea
Republican abstain/no vote

Texas Senate Democrats hoped that there would not be enough votes for the proposition to be put up for debate in the Senate; however, the 21-vote requirement was reached after three Democrats (Note: Ken Armbrister, Eddie Lucio Jr., and Frank L. Madla.) voted to bring it up. The amended resolution was approved by the House 101–29 on April 25, 2005, and by the Texas Senate 21–8 on May 21, 2005, after over two hours of debate. Section 1 of Article 17 of the Texas Constitution requires proposed constitutional amendments to be adopted by a vote of at least two-thirds of the membership of each chamber of the Texas Legislature.

On June 5, Governor Rick Perry signed HJR 6 at a ceremony, though his signature was symbolic because the measure still needed approval by voters.

== Campaign and endorsements ==
Both supporters and opponents of the measure worked to generate interest in the amendment.

=== Support ===
Arguments from those in support of the amendment included that it was necessary to protect the traditional institution of heterosexual marriage, and that Texans should decide how marriage is defined, rather than judges.

Yes

State officials

- Rick Perry, governor of Texas (2000–2015) (Republican)
- Greg Abbott, attorney general of Texas (2002–2015) (Republican)

State legislators

- Warren Chisum, state representative from the 88th district (1989–2013) (Republican)
- Todd Staples, state senator from the 3rd district (2001–2007) (Republican)

Party officials

- Tina Benkiser, chairman of the Republican Party of Texas (2003–2009) (Republican)

Organizations

- Ku Klux Klan

=== Opposition ===
Arguments from those in opposition to the amendment included that it did not allow for the possibility of civil unions, that same-sex marriage was already banned by state statute, making it unnecessary to ban constitutionally, and that federal law already allowed for Texas to not recognize same-sex marriages performed in foreign jurisdictions.

No

Organizations

- National Gay and Lesbian Task Force

Newspapers

- Austin American-Statesman
- Corpus Christi Caller-Times
- El Paso Times
- San Angelo Standard-Times
- The Bryan-College Station Eagle
- The Marshall News Messenger
- The Victoria Advocate
- Waco Tribune-Herald

== Contents and amendment ==
=== Ballot wording ===
The amendment, which was decided by voters alongside the 2005 Texas constitutional amendment election on November 8, 2005, had the following information given to voters for it:

PROPOSITION 2

"The constitutional amendment providing that marriage in this state consists only of the union of one man and one woman and prohibiting this state or a political subdivision of this state from creating or recognizing any legal status identical or similar to marriage."

PROPOSICIÓN 2

"Enmienda constitucional que dispone que en este estado el matrimonio consiste exclusivamente en la unión de un hombre y una mujer y que desautoriza, en este estado o en alguna subdivisión política del mismo, la creación o el reconocimiento de cualquier estatus jurídico idéntico o semejante al matrimonio."

[] For / A Favor De

[] Against / En Contra De

=== Amendment language ===
The amendment added Article 1 to Section 32 of the Texas Constitution:

(a) Marriage in this state shall consist only of the union of one man and one woman.
(b) This state or a political subdivision of this state may not create or recognize any legal status identical or similar to marriage.

== Results ==
Results of Proposition 2 by county, displayed as a treemap in which each rectangle's area is proportional to the number of votes cast on the proposition in that county.

Results of Proposition 2 in Travis County, the only county to oppose the amendment, shown by its state house districts. Yes: 50–60%; No: 80–90%; 60–70%; 50–60%

Proposition 2 passed by a vote of more than three-to-one. With a voter turnout of ~18%, higher than the ~16% predicted by Secretary of State Roger Williams, this was the highest participation in a Texas constitutional amendment election since 1991. Of Texas's 254 counties, 253 of the 254 voted in favor of Proposition 2. Travis County, which includes Austin, was the only county to oppose the amendment, with slightly under 60% of voters opposing it. The highest level of support for the amendment came from Martin County, with 95.41% of votes cast in favor.

Results by county
County	Yes		No		Total votes	Turnout
County	No.	Pct.	No.	Pct.	Total votes	Turnout
Anderson	6,137	90.56	640	9.44	6,777	23.93%
Andrews	1,617	92.03	140	7.97	1,757	21.89%
Angelina	8,210	89.94	918	10.06	9,128	20.01%
Aransas	2,117	76.01	668	23.99	2,785	17.89%
Archer	1,522	91.91	134	8.09	1,656	26.00%
Armstrong	462	93.15	34	6.85	496	33.11%
Atascosa	2,565	84.71	463	15.29	3,028	12.50%
Austin	3,401	88.04	462	11.96	3,863	22.90%
Bailey	812	92.06	70	7.94	882	21.26%
Bandera	2,485	81.26	573	18.74	3,058	22.45%
Bastrop	5,974	71.07	2,432	28.93	8,406	22.57%
Baylor	580	92.36	48	7.64	628	22.21%
Bee	1,732	89.09	212	10.91	1,944	12.25%
Bell	16,891	83.09	3,437	16.91	20,328	14.07%
Bexar	100,308	69.23	44,578	30.77	144,886	16.67%
Blanco	1,387	75.18	458	24.82	1,845	28.60%
Borden	162	90.50	17	9.50	179	39.51%
Bosque	2,166	85.78	359	14.22	2,525	21.45%
Bowie	8,651	91.54	800	8.46	9,451	17.05%
Brazoria	27,582	82.65	5,789	17.35	33,371	21.36%
Brazos	12,618	73.41	4,571	26.59	17,189	20.28%
Brewster	774	64.45	427	35.55	1,201	20.16%
Briscoe	471	93.82	31	6.18	502	39.94%
Brooks	352	79.28	92	20.72	444	7.22%
Brown	5,413	92.07	466	7.93	5,879	24.28%
Burleson	1,815	87.94	249	12.06	2,064	19.05%
Burnet	5,277	81.54	1,195	18.46	6,472	25.81%
Caldwell	2,676	75.64	862	24.36	3,538	16.85%
Calhoun	1,872	87.03	279	12.97	2,151	16.99%
Callahan	1,782	92.81	138	7.19	1,920	21.46%
Cameron	11,831	72.44	4,501	27.56	16,332	10.22%
Camp	1,414	89.78	161	10.22	1,575	21.71%
Carson	1,278	92.21	108	7.79	1,386	29.62%
Cass	4,488	93.48	313	6.52	4,801	26.42%
Castro	938	91.16	91	8.84	1,029	22.60%
Chambers	3,149	88.98	390	11.02	3,539	17.43%
Cherokee	5,329	90.78	541	9.22	5,870	21.00%
Childress	902	94.65	51	5.35	953	25.53%
Clay	1,942	91.65	177	8.35	2,119	27.66%
Cochran	441	90.74	45	9.26	486	24.28%
Coke	506	91.01	50	8.99	556	22.32%
Coleman	1,224	91.96	107	8.04	1,331	21.23%
Collin	44,765	74.45	15,359	25.55	60,124	16.61%
Collingsworth	563	93.52	39	6.48	602	26.02%
Colorado	2,302	88.91	287	11.09	2,589	19.91%
Comal	10,826	81.15	2,515	18.85	13,341	20.47%
Comanche	1,845	89.35	220	10.65	2,065	22.64%
Concho	367	90.62	38	9.38	405	21.65%
Cooke	5,632	89.80	640	10.20	6,272	26.60%
Coryell	3,691	86.52	575	13.48	4,266	11.77%
Cottle	230	91.27	22	8.73	252	19.00%
Crane	501	91.09	49	8.91	550	21.91%
Crockett	392	87.89	54	12.11	446	16.14%
Crosby	1,107	88.42	145	11.58	1,252	29.26%
Culberson	132	81.99	29	18.01	161	8.86%
Dallam	615	94.33	37	5.67	652	20.32%
Dallas	144,559	66.45	72,973	33.55	217,532	18.79%
Dawson	1,482	91.65	135	8.35	1,617	19.12%
Deaf Smith	1,664	93.22	121	6.78	1,785	18.64%
Delta	766	90.54	80	9.46	846	24.93%
Denton	39,650	75.07	13,166	24.93	52,816	16.89%
DeWitt	2,281	88.79	288	11.21	2,569	21.60%
Dickens	674	87.31	98	12.69	772	51.57%
Dimmit	435	80.26	107	19.74	542	7.20%
Donley	689	91.02	68	8.98	757	29.43%
Duval	833	77.78	238	22.22	1,071	11.23%
Eastland	2,386	92.30	199	7.70	2,585	25.19%
Ector	10,465	88.33	1,382	11.67	11,847	17.67%
Edwards	299	89.25	36	10.75	335	22.36%
Ellis	13,632	88.74	1,730	11.26	15,362	20.00%
El Paso	19,870	68.09	9,313	31.91	29,183	8.03%
Erath	3,766	86.42	592	13.58	4,358	22.45%
Falls	1,595	87.35	231	12.65	1,826	19.30%
Fannin	3,775	88.95	469	11.05	4,244	22.37%
Fayette	3,504	87.47	502	12.53	4,006	26.97%
Fisher	659	88.81	83	11.19	742	26.04%
Floyd	1,134	95.37	55	4.63	1,189	27.12%
Foard	154	81.91	34	18.09	188	19.20%
Fort Bend	35,695	82.56	7,542	17.44	43,237	17.07%
Franklin	1,468	89.68	169	10.32	1,637	26.10%
Freestone	2,365	90.41	251	9.59	2,616	23.32%
Frio	752	87.54	107	12.46	859	8.87%
Gaines	1,663	93.85	109	6.15	1,772	25.43%
Galveston	18,331	74.60	6,241	25.40	24,572	13.57%
Garza	646	94.86	35	5.14	681	23.65%
Gillespie	4,132	82.91	852	17.09	4,984	30.90%
Glasscock	223	88.84	28	11.16	251	34.96%
Goliad	718	87.88	99	12.12	817	15.11%
Gonzales	1,703	87.24	249	12.76	1,952	16.52%
Gray	4,099	91.54	379	8.46	4,478	30.76%
Grayson	13,641	87.52	1,946	12.48	15,587	21.54%
Gregg	13,213	89.93	1,480	10.07	14,693	19.98%
Grimes	2,423	84.07	459	15.93	2,882	22.29%
Guadalupe	9,844	80.68	2,358	19.32	12,202	18.95%
Hale	3,568	92.27	299	7.73	3,867	18.91%
Hall	490	91.59	45	8.41	535	24.29%
Hamilton	1,186	87.08	176	12.92	1,362	25.06%
Hansford	904	95.06	47	4.94	951	29.70%
Hardeman	545	90.68	56	9.32	601	20.29%
Hardin	5,121	93.74	342	6.26	5,463	16.60%
Harris	236,071	72.48	89,652	27.52	325,723	17.51%
Harrison	6,717	91.03	662	8.97	7,379	17.69%
Hartley	810	94.30	49	5.70	859	29.97%
Haskell	913	92.04	79	7.96	992	24.42%
Hays	9,253	58.13	6,665	41.87	15,918	20.26%
Hemphill	593	91.65	54	8.35	647	28.59%
Henderson	9,310	87.81	1,293	12.19	10,603	21.70%
Hidalgo	15,497	81.85	3,436	18.15	18,933	7.50%
Hill	3,911	88.20	523	11.80	4,434	20.37%
Hockley	2,663	91.89	235	8.11	2,898	21.15%
Hood	6,675	85.81	1,104	14.19	7,779	24.45%
Hopkins	3,947	90.86	397	9.14	4,344	21.11%
Houston	2,717	91.33	258	8.67	2,975	19.77%
Howard	2,946	90.20	320	9.80	3,266	18.60%
Hudspeth	206	87.66	29	12.34	235	14.90%
Hunt	8,490	86.91	1,279	13.09	9,769	20.21%
Hutchinson	3,714	93.18	272	6.82	3,986	24.93%
Irion	272	84.74	49	15.26	321	25.95%
Jack	1,075	91.18	104	8.82	1,179	24.11%
Jackson	1,946	90.55	203	9.45	2,149	23.06%
Jasper	3,690	93.47	258	6.53	3,948	19.12%
Jeff Davis	294	75.77	94	24.23	388	22.82%
Jefferson	12,631	86.31	2,003	13.69	14,634	9.37%
Jim Hogg	180	89.11	22	10.89	202	5.37%
Jim Wells	1,677	88.68	214	11.32	1,891	7.31%
Johnson	13,920	88.11	1,879	11.89	15,799	20.68%
Jones	1,927	90.55	201	9.45	2,128	20.88%
Karnes	1,099	89.50	129	10.50	1,228	14.89%
Kaufman	7,535	88.92	939	11.08	8,474	16.53%
Kendall	4,044	81.42	923	18.58	4,967	23.92%
Kenedy	46	75.41	15	24.59	61	19.00%
Kent	173	86.50	27	13.50	200	27.74%
Kerr	6,518	84.40	1,205	15.60	7,723	23.97%
Kimble	668	91.51	62	8.49	730	25.69%
King	109	93.16	8	6.84	117	54.17%
Kinney	416	84.21	78	15.79	494	21.07%
Kleberg	1,364	80.57	329	19.43	1,693	9.32%
Knox	563	92.14	48	7.86	611	24.16%
Lamar	6,134	91.72	554	8.28	6,688	23.03%
Lamb	2,360	89.43	279	10.57	2,639	28.30%
Lampasas	2,159	85.50	366	14.50	2,525	21.55%
La Salle	303	82.56	64	17.44	367	8.52%
Lavaca	2,527	92.16	215	7.84	2,742	19.94%
Lee	2,001	87.57	284	12.43	2,285	25.43%
Leon	2,318	90.87	233	9.13	2,551	23.00%
Liberty	5,477	91.37	517	8.63	5,994	13.64%
Limestone	2,294	88.06	311	11.94	2,605	18.75%
Lipscomb	602	94.06	38	5.94	640	33.49%
Live Oak	1,033	91.50	96	8.50	1,129	15.25%
Llano	3,722	82.20	806	17.80	4,528	33.52%
Loving	20	71.43	8	28.57	28	25.45%
Lubbock	25,594	82.63	5,380	17.37	30,974	20.12%
Lynn	758	93.35	54	6.65	812	19.67%
Madison	1,314	91.89	116	8.11	1,430	21.11%
Marion	1,046	85.95	171	14.05	1,217	15.74%
Martin	644	95.41	31	4.59	675	23.45%
Mason	692	82.48	147	17.52	839	29.18%
Matagorda	3,957	87.49	566	12.51	4,523	21.80%
Maverick	665	77.69	191	22.31	856	3.42%
McCulloch	1,088	90.44	115	9.56	1,203	22.34%
McLennan	18,819	80.89	4,445	19.11	23,264	17.91%
McMullen	145	85.80	24	14.20	169	24.42%
Medina	3,121	87.33	453	12.67	3,574	14.72%
Menard	266	82.87	55	17.13	321	17.70%
Midland	13,364	89.82	1,515	10.18	14,879	21.00%
Milam	2,767	82.03	606	17.97	3,373	23.69%
Mills	805	91.27	77	8.73	882	26.97%
Mitchell	834	91.25	80	8.75	914	17.61%
Montague	2,655	90.65	274	9.35	2,929	22.84%
Montgomery	31,600	86.44	4,956	13.56	36,556	17.13%
Moore	2,271	93.19	166	6.81	2,437	25.23%
Morris	1,755	91.07	172	8.93	1,927	22.12%
Motley	327	94.51	19	5.49	346	38.06%
Nacogdoches	5,634	83.44	1,118	16.56	6,752	21.60%
Navarro	5,276	89.73	604	10.27	5,880	21.46%
Newton	1,552	93.49	108	6.51	1,660	17.96%
Nolan	1,859	88.19	249	11.81	2,108	22.70%
Nueces	17,375	74.69	5,888	25.31	23,263	12.19%
Ochiltree	1,372	95.08	71	4.92	1,443	29.35%
Oldham	375	92.59	30	7.41	405	28.07%
Orange	5,699	92.29	476	7.71	6,175	11.80%
Palo Pinto	2,663	85.96	435	14.04	3,098	18.47%
Panola	3,429	93.61	234	6.39	3,663	23.60%
Parker	11,905	87.70	1,669	12.30	13,574	21.01%
Parmer	1,141	95.08	59	4.92	1,200	24.47%
Pecos	983	88.16	132	11.84	1,115	14.47%
Polk	4,367	87.71	612	12.29	4,979	13.72%
Potter	8,309	84.51	1,523	15.49	9,832	17.71%
Presidio	195	67.24	95	32.76	290	5.31%
Rains	1,421	90.97	141	9.03	1,562	24.44%
Randall	17,202	88.98	2,130	11.02	19,332	26.14%
Reagan	353	89.14	43	10.86	396	21.08%
Real	637	86.55	99	13.45	736	30.15%
Red River	1,520	92.57	122	7.43	1,642	20.05%
Reeves	567	87.64	80	12.36	647	9.27%
Refugio	740	86.65	114	13.35	854	15.51%
Roberts	236	92.55	19	7.45	255	36.64%
Robertson	1,772	86.95	266	13.05	2,038	17.70%
Rockwall	8,349	82.77	1,738	17.23	10,087	26.51%
Runnels	1,319	89.91	148	10.09	1,467	21.36%
Rusk	6,269	92.35	519	7.65	6,788	22.35%
Sabine	1,372	88.86	172	11.14	1,544	21.80%
San Augustine	897	87.34	130	12.66	1,027	15.11%
San Jacinto	2,624	89.25	316	10.75	2,940	18.96%
San Patricio	3,525	84.88	628	15.12	4,153	8.78%
San Saba	977	92.00	85	8.00	1,062	29.14%
Schleicher	377	89.55	44	10.45	421	22.76%
Scurry	1,955	92.48	159	7.52	2,114	19.64%
Shackelford	506	92.84	39	7.16	545	21.87%
Shelby	2,942	92.78	229	7.22	3,171	21.85%
Sherman	449	93.15	33	6.85	482	34.35%
Smith	22,357	89.73	2,559	10.27	24,916	21.63%
Somervell	1,158	88.60	149	11.40	1,307	23.60%
Starr	665	81.00	156	19.00	821	3.05%
Stephens	1,085	90.79	110	9.21	1,195	21.18%
Sterling	193	91.90	17	8.10	210	24.42%
Stonewall	340	92.90	26	7.10	366	30.76%
Sutton	409	91.70	37	8.30	446	17.27%
Swisher	991	91.76	89	8.24	1,080	23.65%
Tarrant	128,456	76.79	38,831	23.21	167,287	18.98%
Taylor	12,138	87.17	1,787	12.83	13,925	17.86%
Terrell	145	84.30	27	15.70	172	22.78%
Terry	1,381	92.19	117	7.81	1,498	20.02%
Throckmorton	440	89.80	50	10.20	490	39.71%
Titus	2,919	90.74	298	9.26	3,217	21.35%
Tom Green	11,418	82.63	2,400	17.37	13,818	21.95%
Travis	54,246	40.06	81,170	59.94	135,416	25.18%
Trinity	1,673	89.47	197	10.53	1,870	16.96%
Tyler	2,332	92.80	181	7.20	2,513	18.72%
Upshur	5,194	91.59	477	8.41	5,671	23.85%
Upton	388	90.65	40	9.35	428	21.24%
Uvalde	2,290	86.84	347	13.16	2,637	16.50%
Val Verde	2,276	83.43	452	16.57	2,728	10.74%
Van Zandt	7,189	91.56	663	8.44	7,852	24.88%
Victoria	9,148	86.33	1,449	13.67	10,597	20.08%
Walker	5,012	83.39	998	16.61	6,010	21.40%
Waller	3,330	85.32	573	14.68	3,903	15.60%
Ward	1,282	92.16	109	7.84	1,391	21.69%
Washington	3,722	86.42	585	13.58	4,307	21.26%
Webb	4,619	75.95	1,463	24.05	6,082	6.30%
Wharton	4,412	89.77	503	10.23	4,915	20.05%
Wheeler	1,057	93.87	69	6.13	1,126	29.19%
Wichita	13,373	87.18	1,967	12.82	15,340	20.12%
Wilbarger	3,207	86.89	484	13.11	3,691	43.59%
Willacy	671	82.74	140	17.26	811	7.39%
Williamson	33,677	69.89	14,508	30.11	48,185	24.58%
Wilson	3,275	87.26	478	12.74	3,753	15.95%
Winkler	805	90.35	86	9.65	891	23.28%
Wise	5,896	88.56	762	11.44	6,658	20.21%
Wood	6,231	90.95	620	9.05	6,851	28.67%
Yoakum	919	93.39	65	6.61	984	22.92%
Young	3,228	89.29	387	10.71	3,615	32.50%
Zapata	444	82.22	96	17.78	540	7.92%
Zavala	408	80.63	98	19.37	506	6.58%
Total	1,723,782	76.25	536,913	23.75	2,260,695	17.97%

== Analysis ==
Percentage of Texas voters who cast a vote on Proposition 2 by county. Turnout percentage: 50–60%; 40–50%; 30–40%; 20–30%; 10–20%; 0–10%

=== State comparison ===
Texas became the nineteenth state to adopt a state-level constitutional ban on same-sex marriage, and the second state to ban it in 2005, after Kansas in April.

=== Rural counties ===
The only "truly rural counties with no spillover from nearby cities," as the Austin Chronicle put it, to be among the counties with the lowest levels of support for the proposition, were Brewster and Presidio. The Chronicle assumed that these counties, located in West Texas, had their votes "affected by liberal nature lovers attracted to Big Bend" as well as by "the art community that has developed in Marfa."

=== Racial analysis ===
Although African Americans and Hispanics typically vote Democratic in Texas, they heavily backed the amendment. In an analysis by Robert Stein, a political scientist from Rice University, he found that about 75% of Black voters in and around Houston voted in favor of the ban. Stein stated that the success from Black voters was "explained by heavy black turnout by African American women who go to church."

== Court challenges ==
From the time the proposition was passed, until the Obergefell decision was handed down, two lawsuits were filed against the amendment.

=== In re Marriage of J.B. and H.B. ===
On October 1, 2009, a state district court judge ruled in the case of In re Marriage of J.B. and H.B. that the amendment was unconstitutional under the Equal Protection Clause of the Fourteenth Amendment to the United States Constitution. The lawsuit was filed by two men living in Dallas who had married in Massachusetts in 2006. Texas Attorney General Greg Abbott and Governor Rick Perry appealed to the Fifth Court of Appeals in Dallas. On August 31, 2010, the appellate court reversed the district court, ruling that the amendment did not violate the U.S. Constitution and that district courts in Texas do not have subject-matter jurisdiction to hear a same-sex divorce case.

=== De Leon v. Perry ===
On February 26, 2014, in the case of De Leon v. Perry, Federal Judge Orlando Garcia ruled Texas' same-sex marriage bans to be unconstitutional, though he stayed his ruling after anticipating it would be appealed. A three-judge panel of the 5th Circuit Court of Appeals held a hearing on the matter nearly a year later. Though, before they could rule, the United States Supreme Court delivered its ruling in Obergefell v. Hodges, finding all bans on same-sex marriage to be in violation of the Due Process and Equal Protection clauses of the Fourteenth Amendment. Thereafter, in light of the Supreme Court's decision, Judge Garcia lifted the stay from his ruling, allowing his decision taking down the ban to go into effect.

== See also ==
- LGBTQ rights in Texas
- LGBTQ history in Texas
