= LGBTQ rights in Texas =

- Texas (US)
- Legal status: Legal since 2003; (Lawrence v. Texas)
- Discrimination protections: Federally protected (employment); no state-level laws; Additional protections in some cities and counties

Family rights
- Recognition of relationships: Same-sex marriage since 2015
- Adoption: Adoption permitted for married couples

Lesbian, gay, bisexual, transgender, and queer (LGBTQ) people in the U.S. state of Texas have some protections in state law but may face legal and social challenges not faced by others. Same-sex sexual activity was decriminalized in Texas in 2003 by the Lawrence v. Texas ruling. On June 26, 2015, the Supreme Court of the United States ruled bans on same-sex marriage to be unconstitutional in Obergefell v. Hodges. The federal Respect for Marriage Act, enacted in 2022, established legal protections for same-sex marriages. Under this law, every state, including Texas, must recognize same-sex marriages that were lawfully performed in another state. However, the act does not obligate states to issues marriage licenses to same-sex couples. Every couple in Texas follows the same steps when applying for a marriage license. A majority of Texans support same-sex marriage and anti-discrimination laws for LGBTQ people.

Texas has a hate crime statute that strengthens penalties for certain crimes motivated by a victim's sexual orientation, although crimes are rarely prosecuted under the statute. The law does not cover gender identity. While some localities in Texas have ordinances that provide a variety of legal protections and benefits to LGBTQ people, Texas has had no statewide law banning anti-LGBT discrimination. The federal protections against employment discrimination based on sexual orientation or gender identity, established in 2020 by several landmark cases, apply in Texas. Several metropolitan cities in Texas, including Austin, Dallas, and San Antonio, provide resources, supportive communities, and local anti-discrimination protections for their LGBTQ people. Since September 1, 2025, Texas has explicitly listed banned DEI school and even certain workplace programs for sexual orientation—the implemented law is being challenged by the courts. In November 2025, Texas voters passed a legislative amendment codifying "parental rights" within the state's constitution.

== Laws regarding same-sex sexual activity ==
=== Sodomy ban ===
Until the U.S. Supreme Court in June 2003 declared sodomy laws unconstitutional in Lawrence v. Texas, sodomy was a criminal offense in Texas, termed "deviate sexual intercourse". As of 2023, Texas is one of the three states where dormant sodomy laws only apply to same-sex acts, alongside Kentucky and Kansas. Several bills intended to repeal the sodomy ban have been introduced since Lawrence, which have historically been opposed by state Republicans. A bill repealing the state's law banning male homosexuality was passed by the Texas House in 2025. However, it failed to be passed by the Senate for final approval.

=== Romeo and Juliet law ===
Texas provides an affirmative defense to a person who has engaged in unlawful sexual contact with a child under 17 years of age, if the person is not more than three years older than the child or a spouse of the child, so long as the person is not of the child's same sex. There has been no published constitutional challenge of this statute since the 2015 U.S. Supreme Court ruling in Obergefell v. Hodges, in which the court held that same-sex marriage bans breach the Equal Protection Clause of the Fourteenth Amendment to the U.S. Constitution. Texas has been the only state to maintain such a distinction on its books since the Kansas Supreme Court found a similar Kansas statute to be unconstitutional in 2005. During the Legislature's 2013 regular session, House Bill 2403, introduced by Representative Mary González, House Bill 3322, introduced by Representative Coleman, and Senate Bill 1316, introduced by Senator John Whitmire, would have repealed this distinction; however, none of these bills was passed by its chamber of origin.

== Recognition of same-sex relationships ==
=== Marriage ===
On June 26, 2015, U.S. Supreme Court's decision in Obergefell v. Hodges legalized same-sex marriage nationwide. By September of that year, the Texas Department of State Health Services estimated it had issued 2,500 same-sex marriage licenses in the months following Obergefell. In order for two people of the same-sex, like a traditional marriage, both individuals must be at least 18 years old, must be unrelated, and must be unmarried or single.

==== History ====
The first legal challenge to Texas' ban on marriage between two people of the same sex came in 1972 when Travis Co Attorney Ned Granger requested an opinion from Attorney General Crawford Martin on the legality of issuing such licenses. Martin issued an opinion that, despite the lack of a specific prohibition against same-sex marriage in statute, it was not legally permitted. In 1973, the Texas Family Code was amended by House Bill 103 to explicitly state that a marriage license may only be issued to a man and a woman. HB 103 became effective on January 1, 1974.

In 1997, Texas banned the issuance of marriage licenses to same-sex couples. Additional legislation in 2003 forbade the recognition of any same-sex marriages or civil unions. In 2005, voters approved a referendum that added those restrictions to the Constitution of Texas.

On February 26, 2014, Judge Orlando Luis Garcia, of the United States District Court for the Western District of Texas, found that Texas's ban on same-sex marriage was unconstitutional. On April 23, 2014, Judge Barbara Nellermoe, of the 45th Judicial District Court of Bexar County, found that Texas's ban on same-sex marriage was unconstitutional. Both cases were appealed by Texas Attorney General Greg Abbott.

In February 2015, two state judges in Travis County held the state's ban on same-sex marriage unconstitutional. One ordered the recognition of a common-law marriage between two women and the other order the county clerk to issue a marriage license to two women. They obtained their license and wed before Attorney General Ken Paxton obtained stays from the Texas Supreme Court and asked that court to void the marriage license.

=== Domestic partner benefits ===
Map of Texas counties and cities that offer domestic partner benefits either county-wide or in particular cities. City offers domestic partner benefits County-wide partner benefits through domestic partnership County or city does not offer domestic partner benefits

Same sex-marriages have been recognized throughout the state since 2015. Currently, there is no recognition of domestic partnerships at the statewide level in Texas for either same-sex or opposite-sex couples.

Austin, Dallas, Fort Worth, El Paso, Houston, and San Antonio provide health insurance to domestic partners of city workers. In 2001, 52% of Houston voters approved Proposition 2, an amendment to the city charter prohibiting the city from providing domestic partner benefits for city employees. The amendment, however, specifically permits benefits to be provided to "legal spouses" of employees, and in November 2013, the city's legal department determined it would be unlawful to continue to deny spousal benefits for legally married same-sex couples.

The Pflugerville Independent School District allows domestic partners of district workers to be included in the district's health insurance plan, although the workers must pay the entire cost of the coverage as they do for any dependent.

Dallas County pays cash subsidies to help cover the cost of individual insurance policies purchased by the domestic partners of county employees. The amount of the subsidy is the same as the amount the county contributes to the group insurance plan that covers county employees, which in October 2012 was $300 per month. The county was unable to add the domestic partners to the group plan because the two other counties participating in the plan, Denton and Tarrant, opposed it.

Travis County allows the domestic partners of county employees to participate as dependents in the county's group insurance plan.

El Paso County provides health benefits to unmarried partners of county employees.

Bexar County allows county employee benefits to be extended to domestic partners.

==== 2013 Texas Attorney General opinion ====
In April 2013, Texas Attorney General Greg Abbott, provided his legal opinion that the Texas Constitution prohibits a political subdivision of the state from providing benefits based on a status like "domestic partnership" because it is "similar to marriage". In response, officials in Travis County and Fort Worth defended the legality of their domestic partnership benefits, as did those in other jurisdictions who minimized the significance of the opinion. The Austin Independent School District decided in June 2013 not to offer health benefits to the domestic partners of its employees, but changed its position in August 2013.

=== Family and relationship policy ===
==== Adoption and parenting ====
In Texas, any adult may adopt a child without regard to the adult's sexual orientation or gender identity. According to the advocacy organizations, the Family Equality Council and Equality Texas and the non-profit legal services provider Texas Legal Services Center, same-sex couples are able to adopt as a couple if they are legally married. Supplemental birth certificates are issued or amended with the names of the same-sex couple shown as parents. However, adoption agencies, even those with federal funding, are permitted to discriminate against prospective adoptive parents in accord with the religious beliefs of the agency. Lesbian couples can access in vitro fertilization and assisted insemination treatment. However, the state's requirement for health plans to cover IVF includes severe restrictions, "The fertilization or attempted fertilization of the patient's oocytes is made only with the sperm of the patient's spouse," that reduce their access to assisted reproduction.

===== Adoptions: Past approach =====
Texas statutes have never prohibited same-sex second-parent adoptions or adoption by a same-sex couple and state courts occasionally approved such adoptions, pre-Obergefell v. Hodges. However, such couples were at that time required to adopt as two single people jointly adopting the same child. The Texas Courts of Appeals concluded in 2009 that a lower court's approval of an adoption by a same-sex couple did not represent a "fundamental error". On November 15, 2012, Representative Rafael Anchia introduced House Bill 201 to the Legislature's 2013 regular session. The bill would have deleted the prohibition against issuing a supplemental birth certificate for a child adopted by two men or two women. The bill died in the Judiciary and Civil Jurisprudence committee of the House of Representatives.

Following the Obergefell v. Hodges ruling that compels recognition of same-sex marriage in all states, legally married couples, whether of the same- or opposite-sex, are equally eligible to be considered as adoptive parents, and the prohibition on issuance of supplementary birth certificates listing two men or two women as parents ceased on June 26, 2015.

== Politics ==
While a historically Republican state, Texas's conservative government trifecta was ultimately broken in 2027.

Previous Republican Governor Rick Perry signed a pledge from the National Organization for Marriage to oppose same-sex marriage; Perry also dismissed the Lawrence v. Texas U. S. Supreme Court decision as the product of "nine oligarchs in robes".

Republican Governor Greg Abbott held a conservative stance on LGBTQ rights. On January 30, 2025 Governor Abbott released a press statement affirming that Texas only recognizes two genders and directs Texas State agencies to follow President Donald Trump’s executive order in rejecting gender identities ideologies.

The Texas Democratic Party added certain LGBT rights to the party's platform in 1980, and included same-sex marriage rights in its 2012 platform, becoming the first Democratic state party in the southern United States to do so.

Democrat Senator-elect James Talarico advocates for more inclusive policies and is a member of the Texas House LGBTQ Caucus.

== Legislative and regulatory proposals ==
According to the Texas Tribune, around fifty bills "targeting LGBTQ people" had been filed by Texas lawmakers by early January 2023 for the new legislative session. The range of bills filed cover several aspects that may affect LGBT rights. These include measures: criminalizing provision of gender-affirming health care to minors; reducing access to gender-affirming treatments for individuals of any age; restricting public performances that include performers deemed to be displaying markers or behavior considered appropriate for a sex other than the one assigned to them at birth; disallowing any alteration of sex (gender) marker on official documents for minors; and further restricting participation in sports for transsexual or gender non-conforming people.

=== Efforts to restrict gender-affirming healthcare for minors ===
The signing of Senate bill 14 (SB 14) in June 2023, effectively banning gender-affirming care for minors, follows a number of earlier and ongoing attempts to pass laws with similar effects. For example:

- In May 2021, although an effort to ban gender-affirming healthcare for minors (House Bill 1399) missed its legislative deadline in the House, a similar bill (Senate Bill 1311) was passed by the Senate in an 18–13 vote. The bill would revoke the medical license of any doctor who provides gender-affirming healthcare, including puberty blockers, to minors.
- In February 2022, Texas Attorney General Ken Paxton issued a legal opinion that gender affirming care for transgender youth was child abuse under state law. After this, Texas Governor Greg Abbott told medical professionals and members of the public to report any transgender youth who received such care and called on the Texas Department of Family and Protective Services to investigate parents for child abuse if they helped their kids receive such care, with "criminal penalties" for those who knowingly fail to report. Five district attorneys said they would not follow the order. The ACLU and Lambda Legal sued over the order, and many medical groups condemned it. In March 2022, the Texas Third Court of Appeals reinstated a temporary injunction barring enforcement of Abbott's directive. The ACLU sued on behalf of a family being investigated.

Randy Mulanax, investigative supervisor with the Texas DFPS, testified in court that cases regarding trans children were being subject to different rules than other cases, with investigation of any child reported, regardless of evidence, being mandatory, and investigators being prohibited from discussing the case over email or text.

In July 2022, the state of Texas hired Dr. James Cantor as an expert witness in defense of a directive from Texas Governor Greg Abbott barring minors from receiving gender-affirming care. The suit was supported by LGBT advocacy group PFLAG. According to an article in the Houston Chronicle, Cantor said that for minors experiencing gender dysphoria, the condition may desist and they may become cisgender gay or lesbian people. The attorneys for the plaintiffs objected saying that the studies referred to "tomboys" and "effeminate" youth. They further argued that Cantor lacked practical experience treating minors with gender dysphoria, and most of the studies he cited were published before 1988.

Also in July 2022, Yale University released a point by point rebuttal of the justifications given by Texas and Alabama for their bans on youth gender affirming care, stating that puberty blockers and hormone therapies are in fact safe and effective for treating gender dysphoria, that "these are not close calls or areas of reasonable disagreement", and that both states "ignore established medical authorities and repeat discredited, outdated, and poor-quality information" and repeatedly cite "a fringe group whose listed advisors have limited (or no) scientific and medical credentials and include well known anti-trans activists".

=== Social workers and discrimination ===
In October 2020, a new "internal policy" and regulation within Texas permitted discrimination by social workers against LGBT individuals and individuals with a disability who are clients.

On February 23, 2022, Texas Governor Greg Abbott signed an order to direct the Texas Department of Family and Protective Services to investigate providing gender-affirming healthcare to transgender people under 18 as child abuse. He also encouraged licensed professionals who work with children and the general public to report the parents of transgender youth. On March 1, 2022, the American Civil Liberties Union (ACLU), the ACLU of Texas and Lambda Legal filed a lawsuit to block the directive on the behalf of Dr. Megan Mooney, a clinical psychologist, and an anonymous family containing two supportive parents and a 16-year-old transgender girl who was being treated with puberty blockers to prevent gender dysphoria.

=== Stance on LGBT support organizations ===
In February 2022, the Texas Department of Health and Human Services removed a listing for The Trevor Project, a national organization for LGBT youth, from its online suicide prevention resources.

=== Transgender people in the performing arts ===
A bill which, if passed, will widen the definition of "sexually oriented businesses" (SOBs) was prefiled in the Texas legislature in November 2022. The intent of HB 643, according to the filing member Rep. Jared Patterson, is to criminalize allowing minors to attend drag shows, but the new, broader definitions of "sexually oriented businesses" contained in the bill will capture a range of public performances other than "drag shows". They will also restrict access to any entertainment where, either, transgender persons perform in any role, or cisgender persons depict characters of diverse or ambiguous genders, such as occurs in many traditional theatrical productions. This is because the bill covers any performance where a performer uses "clothing, makeup, or other physical markers" to "exhibit a gender" at variance from the one assigned to them at birth and also "sings, lip syncs, dances, or otherwise performs" in front of an audience. As currently defined, SOBs are businesses where anyone performs nude, as in, for example, "strip shows".

=== Education ===
In June 2025, Governor Abbott signed into law the Texas Parents' Bill of Rights, barring school employees from teaching or discussing anything related to race gender identity or sexual orientation; banning LGBT-related student orgs; implementing mandatory deadnaming and misgendering for trans students; and giving parents broad authority over their child's activities at school.

== Discrimination protections ==
=== Texas courts ===
In March 2021, Texas courts have fully recognised that LGBT individuals have employment protections, based on the 2020 Bostock v. Clayton County Supreme Court of the United States (SCOTUS) legal precedent. In 2022, Texas became a plaintiff in a federal lawsuit to overturn some LGBT protections on Constitutional grounds.

=== State law ===
As of 2021, no Texas state law protects employees from discrimination based on their sexual orientation or gender identity. Since at least 1999, no bill prohibiting discrimination by employers based on sexual orientation or gender identity has made it out of the committee stage in the Texas Legislature. During the Legislature's 2013 regular session, House Bill 238 introduced by Representative Mike Villarreal, House Bill 1146 introduced by Representative Eric Johnson, and Senate Bill 237 introduced by Senator Leticia Van de Putte would have prohibited this kind of discrimination; however, all these bills died in their respective committees. Judge Lee Rosenthal of the Southern District Court of Texas has ruled that sexual orientation and gender identity fall under Federal Protections. However, in April 2018, a federal judge of the U.S. District Court for the Southern District of Texas ruled that, although a woman hadn't proven she had been discriminated against for being transgender by the company Phillips 66, if that had been proven, then the woman would have "had a case" under Title VII of the Civil Rights Act of 1964. The judge, who had been appointed by President George H. W. Bush in 1992, cited other recent cases as shaping the final decision.

Texas state law doesn't protect people from housing or public accommodations discrimination based on their sexual orientation or gender identity or expression. House Bill 2215 introduced by Representative Jessica Farrar in the Legislature's 2009 regular session would have prohibited this kind of discrimination; however, the bill died in the Judiciary and Civil Jurisprudence committee of the House of Representatives.

Texas state law also doesn't protect people from insurance discrimination based on their sexual orientation or gender identity or expression. During the Legislature's 2013 regular session, House Bill 206 introduced by Representative Senfronia Thompson, House Bill 541 introduced by Representative Robert Alonzo, and Senate Bill 73 introduced by Senator Rodney Ellis would have prohibited this kind of discrimination; however, all these bills died in their respective committees.

==== Religious freedom bills ====
In June 2019, a religious freedom bill, Prohibited Adverse Actions by Government (Protection of Membership in and Support to Religious Organizations), often referred to by media as the "Save Chick-fil-A' bill", was passed by the Texas Legislature. The act, SB 1978, prohibits any government, or government agency, from treating adversely anyone who supports any religious organization, which may include organizations that refuse service to members of the LGBTQ community, or those that campaign against equality measures or policy.

As originally introduced in the senate, the bill had far broader provisions. For example, Section 2400.002 of the unamended version, filed by Bryan Hughes included direct mention of "beliefs regarding marriage" as protected; the bill as passed was amended to exclude that specification. The final bill also dispensed with language that referred to individuals' "sincerely held" beliefs or convictions; instead, the enacted version enumerates ties to or support of religious organizations.

The enacted bill differed substantively from the original, unpassed version of § 2400.002. An example of the difference between versions is shown below (unenacted version, in italics; enrolled version, as passed, in roman text):

Notwithstanding any other law, a governmental entity may not take any adverse action against any person based wholly or partly on a person's belief or action in accordance with the person's sincerely held religious belief or moral conviction, including beliefs or convictions regarding marriage.

— "Introduced version" (not passed) of Senate Bill 1978, § 2400.002
Translation:

Notwithstanding any other law, a governmental entity may not take any adverse action against any person based wholly or partly on the person's membership in, affiliation with, or contribution, donation, or other support provided to a religious organization.

— Senate Bill No. 1978, § 2400.002 (enrolled version; passed June 10, 2019; enacted, as amended)

Emma Platoff, writing in the Texas Tribune, considered that the amended bill only restated existing protections for freedom of religion and association, saying:

The original version of Hughes' proposal prevented government retaliation against an individual based on that "person's belief or action in accordance with the person's sincerely held religious belief or moral conviction, including beliefs or convictions regarding marriage" — language advocates feared would embolden businesses to discriminate against gay Texans. The revision, ...outlaws government retaliation against someone based on his or her association with or support of a religious organization. That revised language is largely duplicative of existing protections for freedom of religion and freedom of association.

The LGBT caucus in the Texas House of Representatives worked to reduce the possible impact of the bill. In addition to removal of any reference to "marriage beliefs", and the substitution of objective associations with religious organizations for less-definable subjective "beliefs" or "convictions", opposing members achieved a further concession: A provision which would have allowed the Attorney General prosecutorial powers over government entities alleged to have contravened the bill was also removed. According to a 2019 report from TIME, the efforts of Democrats and the LGBT caucus rendered the bill much less threatening to LGBT rights than in its original design: "The new version of the bill essentially restates already-existing legal protections for freedom of religion and freedom of association," the Time reporter writes. Time also reports Texas House Rep. Jessica González, a Democrat and LGBT caucus member, as saying, "By the time the bill passed on Tuesday, it was mostly stripped of language that could have reduced LGBTQ rights." Nevertheless, González noted that, "Ultimately, the bill was born out of intolerance" and "It gives people the license to discriminate."

Effective 2025, judges who refuse to perform same-sex wedding ceremonies for couples due to religious beliefs will face no punishments.

=== Counties with LGBT protections ===
County	Protections for	Applies to
Bexar County	Sexual orientation and gender identity	County employment
Dallas County	Sexual orientation and gender identity	Private employment, county employment and county contractors
Walker County	Sexual orientation and gender identity	County employment
Travis County	Sexual orientation	Housing
Harris County	Sexual orientation and gender identity	County employment

=== Cities with LGBT protections ===
Map of Texas counties and cities that have sexual orientation and/or gender identity anti–employment discrimination ordinances Sexual orientation and gender identity with anti–employment discrimination ordinance Sexual orientation and gender identity solely in public employment Sexual orientation in public employment Does not protect sexual orientation and gender identity in employment

The following Texas cities have ordinances prohibiting discrimination on the basis of sexual orientation and gender identity in housing, public accommodations, city employment, private employment and city contractors.

Austin, Dallas, Fort Worth, Plano and San Antonio prohibit discrimination on the basis of sexual orientation and gender identity in private and public employment, housing and public accommodations.

Denton has protections for sexual orientation and gender identity for city employment and city contractors.

El Paso has protections based on sexual orientation and gender identity for public accommodations and city employment.

Arlington, Brownsville, Corpus Christi, Houston, Irving, Lubbock, Mesquite and Waco have protections based on sexual orientation and gender identity for city employment—including city contractors in some cities—only. Houston previously had wide-ranging antidiscrimination measures that also covered residents and visitors, introduced in 2014, but these were soon repealed by voters in 2015.

Grand Prairie, McAllen, and Round Rock have a city policy prohibiting city employment discrimination on the basis of sexual orientation only.

==== Status of non-discrimination protections in Texas' top 20 cities ====
Non-discrimination protections: Top 20 cities
	City	Protections	Applies to
1	Houston	Sexual orientation and gender identity	City employment and city contractors, only
2	San Antonio	Sexual orientation and gender identity	Private employment, city employment, housing, public accommodations and city contractors
3	Dallas	Sexual orientation and gender identity	Private employment, city employment, housing, public accommodations and city contractors
4	Austin	Sexual orientation and gender identity	Private employment, city employment, housing, public accommodations and city contractors
5	Fort Worth	Sexual orientation and gender identity	Private employment, city employment, housing, public accommodations and city contractors
6	El Paso	Sexual orientation and gender identity	City employment and public accommodations
7	Arlington	Sexual orientation and gender identity	City employment
8	Corpus Christi	Sexual orientation and gender identity	City employment
9	Plano	Sexual orientation and gender identity	Private employment, city employment, housing, public accommodations and city contractors
10	Laredo	No protections	None
11	Lubbock	Sexual orientation and gender identity	City employment
12	Garland	No protections	None
13	Irving	Sexual orientation and gender identity	City employment
14	Amarillo	No protections	None
15	Grand Prairie	Sexual orientation	City employment
16	Brownsville	Sexual orientation and gender identity	City employment
17	Pasadena	No protections	None
18	Mesquite	Sexual orientation and gender identity	City employment
19	McKinney	No protections	None
20	McAllen	Sexual orientation	City employment

=== School districts with LGBT inclusive policies ===
The following school districts have both employee welfare and student welfare policies prohibiting discrimination based on sexual orientation, gender identity, and gender expression:

- Del Valle Independent School District (ISD)
- Dallas ISD
- Fort Worth ISD
- Austin ISD

and Houston ISD.

El Paso ISD has similar protections, worded as "gender stereotyping and perceived sexuality."

Cedar Hill ISD has protections for sexual orientation only.

Pflugerville ISD has explicit protections for employees only, but these same explicit protections are missing from the student non-discrimination policy.

=== University LGBT non-discrimination policies ===
==== Sexual orientation, gender identity and gender expression ====
The following universities have non-discrimination policies for students and employees based on sexual orientation, gender identity and gender expression

Non-discrimination protections: Universities
University	Locations, campuses	Coverage notes	Ref
Sexual orientation, gender identity and gender expression
Georgetown University			
University of Houston	(all locations)		
University of North Texas	(all locations)		
Our Lady of the Lake University		(employee protections only)	
Rice University			
Southern Methodist University			
Stephen F Austin State University|			
Texas A&M Commerce			
Texas A&M-Corpus Christi			
University of Texas at Austin			
University of Texas at Dallas			
University of Texas at San Antonio			
University of Texas Health Science Center at Houston			
University of Texas Pan American			
Texas Christian University			
Texas State University			
West Texas A&M			

==== Sexual orientation and gender identity ====
- The following universities have non-discrimination policies for students and employees based on sexual orientation and gender identity:
- Lamar University
- Sam Houston State University
- and University of Texas at El Paso

==== Sexual orientation ====
The following universities have non-discrimination policies for students and employees based on sexual orientation only:

- Angelo State University
- Midwestern State University (student protections only)
- Prairie View A&M
- Southwestern University
- Texas A&M Galveston
- Texas A&M International University
- Texas Southern University
- Texas Tech University
- Texas Woman's University (student protections only)
- University of Texas at Arlington
- University of Texas Brownsville
- University of Texas at Tyler
- University of Texas Permian Basin

==== On-campus housing ====
The following universities have non-discrimination statements for sexual orientation for on-campus housing:

- Angelo State University
- Sam Houston State University
- Southern Methodist University
- Southwestern University
- Tarleton State University
- Texas A&M College Station
- Texas A&M Galveston
- Texas A&M International University
- Texas A&M University–Kingsville
- Texas A&M University–Texarkana
- Texas Tech University
- Texas Woman's University
- University of North Texas (all campuses)
- University of Texas at Dallas
- University of Texas at El Paso.

The following universities have non-discrimination statements for roommate selection and roommate requests based on sexual orientation:

- Georgetown University
- Lamar University
- Rice University
- Texas A&M University Commerce
- Texas State University
- University of Texas San Antonio
- and University of Texas Tyler.

=== Discrimination in Texas ===
==== Gender identity discrimination ====
In response to a national 2010 survey, 79 percent of Texans felt that these people were experiencing harassment or mistreatment at work, and 45 percent reported that they were not hired, 26 percent reported that they were fired, and 22 percent reported being denied a promotion because of their gender identity or expression. House Bill 1106 revises the Texas Family Code so that a parent's decision not to affirm a child's gender identity or sexual orientation is explicitly excluded from the legal definition of child abuse.

==== Public opinion on non-discrimination laws ====
Aggregated data from two large public opinion polls find that 79% of Texas residents think that LGBTQ people experience a moderate amount to a lot of discrimination in the state.

In response to a national poll conducted in 2011, 73% of respondents from Texas said that employment discrimination based on sexual orientation and gender identity should be prohibited in the U.S.

== Gender identity and expression ==
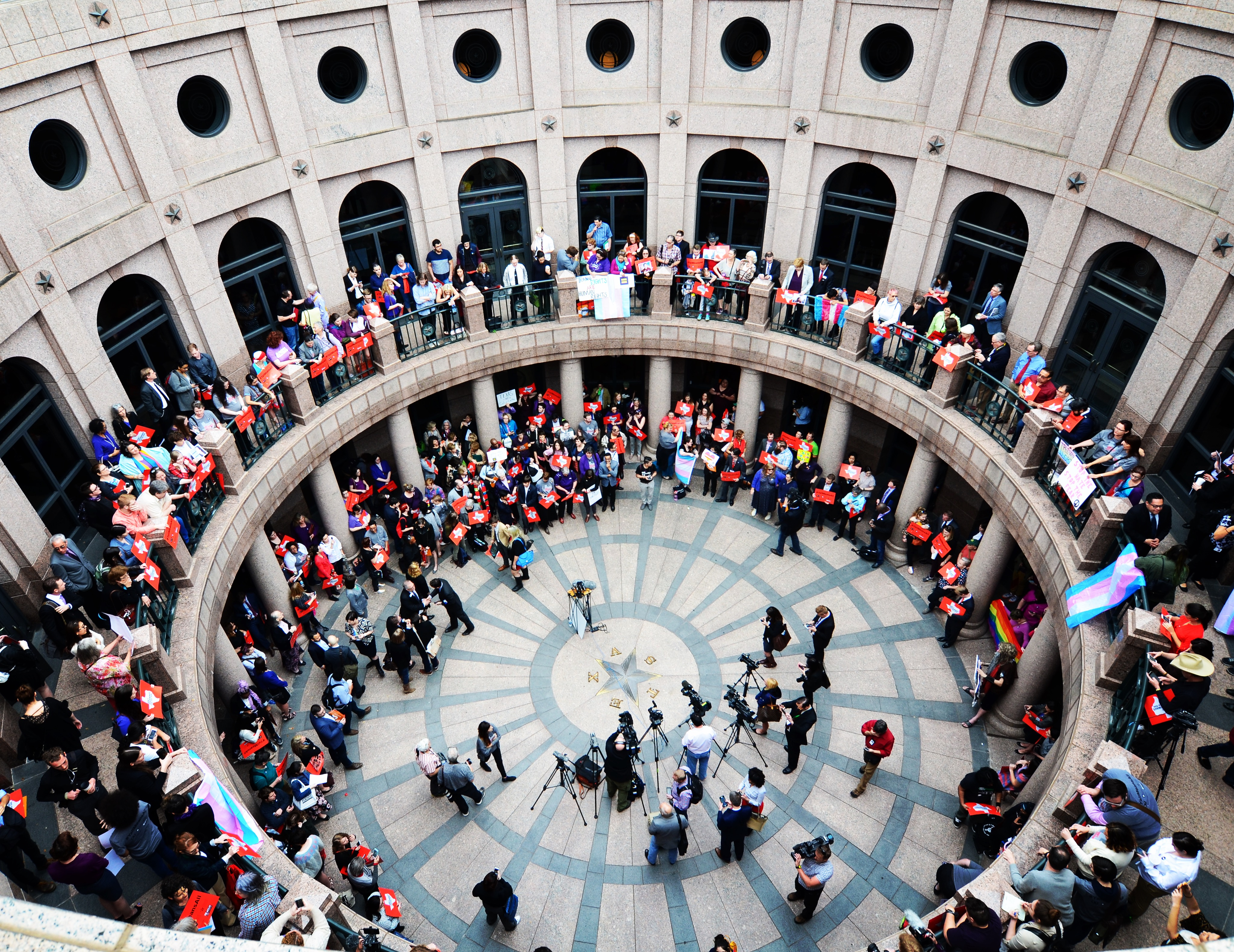
Transgender activists protest a proposed "bathroom bill" at the Texas State Capitol in 2017.

=== Documentation ===
In May 2025, both houses of the Texas Legislature passed a “broad and comprehensively expansive bill” to (1) legally define both male and female based on “reproductive systems” and also (2) explicitly ban any sex changes on Texas documents - covering both drivers licenses and birth certificates. The Governor of Texas signed the bill in June 2025 and it took effect in September 2025. The House Bill 229 dubbed the Women’s Bill of Rights defined a woman as being someone who can biologically produce ova, and defined a male as being someone who can biologically fertilize an ova. Anyone with disorders on sex development must choose one gender as the bill does not recognize a third gender. This applies to all state statutes, regulations and laws that use gendered pronouns such as female, male, girl, boy.

Prior to that, in order for people to legally change the gender indicator on their birth certificates in Texas, they required a court order. Judges were allowed to exercise their discretion, and, according to information compiled by the Travis County Law Library, judges "often look to the Current Standards of Care (SOC)" as set by the World Professional Association for Transgender Health (WPATH) when considering petitions. Applicants are required to have undergone "appropriate treatment", but sex reassignment surgery, nor any other specific treatment, is not required. A "narrative statement" from a doctor or therapist stating the individual has received, in the health professional's opinion, appropriate care, and it is in their best interest that the person's record is changed must be included in the applicant's petition to the court.

=== Attempts to compile lists of those who changed gender ===
In December 2022, it was reported by the Washington Post that the Attorney General's office had requested a full list of all gender changes on Texas driver's licenses and other department records. The Texas Department of Public Safety (DPS) were asked to provide the "total number of changes from male to female and female to male for the last 24 months [prior to June 2022], broken down by month" according to inter-departmental messages obtained by The Post. The DPS search resulted in more than 16,000 instances, but the department could not accurately determine the reasons for the marker changes without manually searching the records: Results included instances of changes due to error corrections, for example, and no method existed to extract records solely altered due to gender change, except by manual review of all related documentation.

A DPS spokesperson advised The Post that, therefore, "Ultimately, our team advised the AG's office the data requested neither exists nor could be accurately produced. Thus, no data of any kind was provided." The procedure followed to obtain these data did not conform to normal practise, according to the Washington Post. The newspaper's information is that usual channels for such requests were bypassed by going directly to driver license division staff. According to a state employee who spoke to The Post, DPS staff were told that "Paxton's office wanted 'numbers' and later would want 'a list' of names, as well as 'the number of people who had had a legal sex change.' "

In August 2024, it was announced that Texans would no longer be allowed to change the sex marker on their license, and that any who submitted such a request would see it denied and their name and identification number noted as having sought such a change. As of August 2025, a list had been compiled by the state of 110 people who had submitted such a request.

=== Bathroom restrictions ===
On September 22, 2025, Governor Greg Abbott signed a bill requiring people to use only the bathroom matching the sex on their birth certificate. It applies to public schools, universities, prisons, and Texas government buildings. If anyone violates this law, the facility will be fined $25,000 for the first instance and $125,000 for subsequent instances. The ban took effect on December 4. Shortly thereafter, the state set up a tip line for citizens to report trans people who disobey.

=== Gender-affirming healthcare ===
==== Minors ====
On June 2, 2023, Governor Greg Abbott signed a bill (SB 14) to ban gender-affirming care for minors. Authored by state Sen. Donna Campbell, it prohibits hormone therapies and treatments which "block" the onset of puberty. Such treatments are supported in appropriate cases by the major medical groups, including the American Academy of Pediatrics, the American Psychiatric Association, and the Endocrine Society.

When Abbott initially signed the bill, the American Civil Liberties Union, the ACLU of Texas, Lambda Legal and the Transgender Law Center said they were preparing to fight its implementation in court. In 2021, legal battles had achieved temporary injunctions against similar laws in other states.

However, on August 31, the day before the law was due to take effect, the Supreme Court of Texas allowed the law to go ahead.

Texas Attorney General Ken Paxton subpoenaed the medical records of trans kids from Seattle Children's Hospital and from QueerMed, a Georgia-based telehealth clinic. On April 22, 2024, Paxton's office announced a court settlement by which it would no longer seek to access transgender people's information from the Washington hospital, whose officials have denied giving gender-affirming care to any Texas minors.

On October 17, 2024, Texas attorney general Ken Paxton filed suit against a doctor who allegedly provided gender-affirming care to 21 minors after the treatments had been banned for minors in Texas, the first time that such a suit has been brought in the U.S.

In May 2026, an investigation against Texas Children's Hospital by Paxton for violating the ban ended with a settlement in which the hospital was forced to fire all of its doctors which had provided gender-affirming care, and instead build a first-of-its-kind "detransition clinic" which provided detransition services to patients who had undergone gender affirming care.

==== Adults ====
In March 2024, the state implemented a new rule banning Medicaid from covering any form of hormone therapy for trans adults.

=== Marriage and gender identity ===
In 2009, the Texas Legislature authorized a court order relating to a person's sex change to be acceptable proof of identity for a marriage license.

For geographical areas under the jurisdiction of the Texas Court of Appeals in San Antonio, the 1999 case Littleton v. Prange defined that, for purposes of determining the validity of a marriage, a person's sex is determined at birth and is not changed by surgery or drug therapy. This ruling allowed a person born male who transitioned to female to marry a woman in that court's jurisdiction. In February 2014, the Texas Court of Appeals in Corpus Christi held that state law had changed since Littleton and now recognized sex reassignment, so that parties to a lawsuit contesting whether or not a marriage was an invalid same-sex marriage or a valid different-sex marriage needed to have their dispute heard by a trial court.

=== Sports ===
In October 2021, the Texas Legislature passed a bill, HB25, to legally ban transgender athletes within any female sports, Olympics, or athletics teams. The Governor of Texas Greg Abbott signed the bill into law, which went into legal effect from January 18, 2022.

The bill requires that students enrolled in public schools may only participate in athletic competitions within the sex category they were assigned at birth. This means that if the officially registered sex at birth differs from one's gender identity and expression, an individual may not participate in events or in teams of that gender identity, but only in those for their "original" sex. The restriction applies in all public schools from Kindergarten to 12th grade in Texas.

The HB25 bill is more extensive than existing University Interscholastic League (UIL) rules which has the similar requirement of students only being allowed to participate in athletic competitions with the same group of assigned sex. However, the UIL rule accepts amended birth certificates, which allows transgender people to participate with the opposite sex if in their official certificate it has changed. HB25 has no written guidance on how schools are to carry out and enforce the bill, but language in the bill directs to the UIL to create said process. UIL's language upholds Title IX, the federal law that prohibits any discrimination based on sex.

== Other legal and policy issues ==
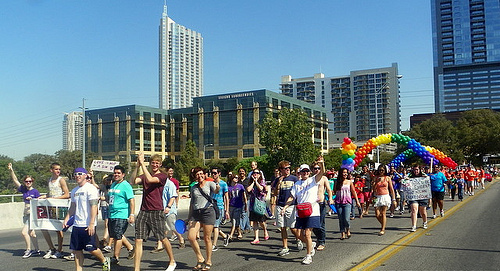
The 2011 edition of Austin Pride

=== Hate crime law ===
On May 11, 2001, Governor Rick Perry signed House Bill 587, popularly but unofficially known as the James Byrd Jr. Hate Crimes Act, which strengthened penalties for certain crimes motivated by a victim's race, color, disability, religion, national origin or ancestry, age, gender, or sexual preference. This legislation did not cover gender identity. (Note: (a) In the trial of an offense under Title 5, Penal Code, or Section 28.02, 28.03, or 28.08, Penal Code, the judge shall make an affirmative finding of fact and enter the affirmative finding in the judgment of the case if at the guilt or innocence phase of the trial, the judge or the jury, whichever is the trier of fact, determines beyond a reasonable doubt that the defendant intentionally selected the person against whom the offense was committed or intentionally selected property damaged or affected as a result of the offense because of the defendant's bias or prejudice against a group identified by race, color, disability, religion, national origin or ancestry, age, gender, or sexual preference. (c) In this article, "sexual preference" has the following meaning only: a preference for heterosexuality, homosexuality, or bisexuality." House Bill 3324 introduced by Representative Garnet Coleman in the Legislature's 2013 regular session would have added gender identity or expression to the hate crime law; however, the bill died in the Criminal Jurisprudence committee of the House of Representatives.)

In the first decade after the law took effect on September 1, 2001, local law enforcement agencies had reported about 200 crimes per year as hate crimes. However, fewer than one case a year on average had been charged by prosecutors as a hate crime in Texas. This is among the states with the lowest percentage of prosecuted hate crimes.

=== Sex education ===
The Texas Department of State Health Services has developed model education programs on AIDS and HIV; however, Texas law requires that the "materials in the education programs intended for persons younger than 18 years of age ... state that homosexual conduct is not an acceptable lifestyle and is a criminal offense...." In practice, few school districts include that language about homosexual conduct in their sex education materials.

In November 2020, the Texas Board of Education updated the sex education materials policy, and voted in favor of changing the anti-bullying definition to include “sexual bullying". There was an effort by 5 Democratic board members to expand the policy to include “bullying and harassment because of sexual orientation and gender identity or expression,” but was blocked by 10 Republican members of the board.

As of December 2020, the Texas "no promo homo law" still remains on the statute books.

== City bounty ==
In October 2024, the city of Odessa passed a bounty ordinance that allows individuals to sue transgender people who use bathrooms that don't correspond to their biological sex, regardless of whether or not they've changed their legal gender. The ordinance requires the plaintiff to sue for a minimum of $10,000 and sets no maximum.

== Public opinion ==
Support for same-sex marriage
When	Organizer	Support	Oppose	Not sure	Sample size	Margin of error
August / September 2010	Glengariff Group, Inc.	42.7%	52.7%		1,000 registered voters	±3.1%
September 2011	Public Policy Polling	29%	61%	10%	569 residents	±4.10%
January 2013	Public Policy Polling	35%	55%	10%	500 voters	±4.4%
January 2013	Glengariff Group, Inc.	47.9%	47.5%		1,000 registered voters	±3.1%
June/July 2013	Public Policy Polling	34%	57%	9%	500 registered voters	±4.4%
December 2013	Public Religion Research Institute	48%	49%	4%	297 registered voters	±6.6%

Support for legal recognition of same-sex relationships
When	Organizer	Same-sex marriage	Civil union	No legal recognition	Unsure	Sample size	Margin of error
June 2009	University of Texas	29%	32%	32%	8%	924 residents	±3.22%
June 2009	Texas Lyceum	32%	25%	36%	7%	860 residents	Unknown
February 2010	University of Texas	28%	35%	30%	7%	800 registered voters	±3.46%
September 2010	Texas Lyceum	28%	24%	40%	9%	725 residents	Unknown
May 2011	University of Texas	30%	31%	33%	6%	800 registered voters	±3.46%
September 2011	Public Policy Polling	24%	35%	40%	1%	569 residents	±4.10%
February 2012	University of Texas	31%	29%	33%	7%	800 registered voters	±3.46%
October 2012	University of Texas	36%	33%	25%	7%	800 registered voters	±3.46%
January 2013	Public Policy Polling	33%	28%	36%	3%	500 voters	±4.4%
February 2013	University of Texas	37%	28%	28%	7%	800 registered voters	±3.46%
June 2013	University of Texas	39%	30%	26%	5%	1,200 registered voters	±2.83%
June/July 2013	Public Policy Polling	31%	32%	31%	6%	500 voters	±4.4%
February 2014	American National Election Studies	32%	37%	31%	-	?	?

Since 2009, Texans between the ages of 18 and 29 have increasingly supported same-sex marriage at a faster rate than that of the general population. In June 2009, the University of Texas found that 49% of that age group supported same-sex marriage as opposed to 29% of the general population. In February 2013, it found that 59% of them did so, while only 37% of the general population had the same opinion. Opposition from Texans between the ages of 18 and 29 dropped 12 points in the same period, from 28 to 16%. At the same time, opposition from the general population in Texan dropped 5 points, from 52.7% to 47.5%. Glengariff Group, Inc., in conjunction with the pro-LGBT rights Equality Texas Foundation, found that support in that age group rose from 53.6% in 2010 to 67.9% in 2013, while within the general population in Texas, support rose from 42.7% to 47.9%.

Later polls have found that a majority of Texans support same-sex marriage. A 2017 Public Religion Research Institute poll, for example, showed support for same-sex marriage in Texas at 55 percent. Thirty-four percent were opposed and 11 percent were unsure. In 2024, the same poll had 61 percent in favor, with 35 percent opposed (and 3 percent unsure or non-responsive to the question).

== Support organizations ==
=== Equality Texas ===
Equality Texas has been working hard to build tools and resources to engage in the civic process since 1978. They started leadership programs, real-time bill tracking, work centers on public education, skill building, and on-the-ground organizing in the fight against anti-LGBTQIA+.

Equality Texas is the largest statewide nonprofit fighting for LGBTQIA+ Texans. They have six pillars of foundations to help Texans feel more comfortable. (Organize, Education, Analyze, Advocate, Train, and Connect).

Equality Texas has many opportunities to seek comfort and to speak up.

- Organize- To help organize the communities across the state to speak up for equality.
- Educate- To learn about the history of the LGBTQ+ and also educate the public about current events and pending legislation.
- Analyze- Analyze the policy and education lawmakers about LGBTQIA+ issues.
- Advocate- To testify or share your story. Advocate for LGBTQIA+ rights at the state and local levels.
- Train- Train to be a leader to fight for human rights.
- Connect- Connect with people all around Texas and use the tools, resources, and support.

=== Austin LGBT Chamber of Commerce ===
The Austin LGBT Chamber of Commerce wants to create a safe space for equality and inclusion. They want to promote economic vitality in the communities to strengthen the LGBTQ+ businesses.

Austin LGBT Chamber of Commerce was founded in 1997. Austin is known as Texas's Central largest hub for the LGBTQ+ organizations, community and any adjacent businesses. Their mission is to foster and sustain a thriving regional economy, bolstered by the full engagement of diverse local communities.

In June 2001, the first Annual Austin LGBT Chamber Pride Parade was held. It was a massive success that in 2008, there's reported that approximately 45,000 people attended. In 2009, both the parade and the festival were combined into one event which totaled over 50,000 people that came to celebrate and show support.

In June 2016, the first PROUD event was held. PROUD is an event where the Chamber comes to celebrate its founding, Pride month, and Annual Business Awards. At this event, they also give out scholarships to the LGBTQ students that participate through its foundation.

In 2024, The Chamber awarded $60k in scholarships and grants through the Austin LGBT Chamber Education Fund and their partnership with the NGLCC (National LGBTQ+ and Allied Chamber of Commerce).

=== Transgender Education Network of Texas ===
The Transgender Education Network of Texas (TENT), headed by Emmett Schelling, works to further gender diversity equity agenda in the U.S. state of Texas. As of 2016, the organization was registered as a 501(c)(3) not-for-profit organization in the United States.

TENT was founded in 2002 as the Austin Transgender Ordinance Initiative. TENT's main work is in education, advocacy, and empowerment, and it works in both public and private forums to prevent discrimination against transgender, non-binary, and intersex people in Texas. It also supports pro-transgender legislation in Texas.

TENT is a member of the Austin LGBT Chamber of Commerce. In community advocacy, it partners with other organizations such as the American Civil Liberties Union (ACLU) of Texas, Anti-Defamation League of Central Texas, Equality Texas, Human Rights Campaign and the Texas Freedom Network.

In addition to offering "cultural competency" seminars, workshops and presentations itself to a variety of organizations, TENT has also collaborated with other research and education initiatives. One such research collaboration aimed to understand and improve the education of transgender-related health topics within Texas nursing programs' curricula.

In March 2017, one of the organization's primary focuses has been collecting the testimonies of transgender, non-binary, and intersex people and their allies in Texas. Many of these testimonies were collected specifically in reaction to the proposal of Texas SB6, a "bathroom bill" intending to limit bathroom access based on the sex listed on one's birth certificate. The organization maintains a record of testimony provided to the Texas State Senate's committee of State Affairs regarding SB6 by transgender, non-binary, and intersex people and their allies on its website.

In March 2018, as part of a coalition with ACLU of Texas, Equality Texas, and Lambda Legal, TENT created TxTransKids.org, a support network and resource center for elementary and high school transgender students and their families.

==== 2026 impersonation incident ====
In October 2026, text messages and mailers using TENT's branding were sent to numerous Texans from Wyoming-registered Texas Transgender Student Union LLC which included resource links to TENT's website. The mailers drew significant backlash and confusion, including prompting state representative Jeff Leach to call on the Texas Attorney General’s office to investigate TENT for "circumventing and violating" Texas Senate Bill 12. TENT stated these were not from the organization and sent a cease and desist letters to messaging companies Peerless Network and Infobip for misdemeanor online impersonation. West Texas Republican district attorney Sarah Stogner announced she had opened a forgery investigation into the incident on October 22, 2026.

According to a deposition from Infobib, the messages were sent on behalf the Republican Women Caucus Fund and an individual named John Braun; a spokesperson for the Republican Women Caucus Fund denied involvement and the deposition did not confirm if Braun was John Braun, a Republican politician from Washington state. TENT stated that the outreach impersonating the organization, which were sent at the start of early voting in 2026 Texas elections, felt designed to "agitate voters and cause reputational harm to their organization."

=== Trans Legal Aid Clinic Texas (TLACT) ===
TLACT is a volunteer-run, non-profit legal clinic based in Houston that will provide pro bono legal services to trans individuals seeking legal name and gender changes.

TLACT was founded in 2014 by a trans activist, Lou Weaver, who brought four attorney friends together to find a way to help other trans Texans obtain a legal transition.

In 2015, The Trans Legal Aid Clinic of Houston (TLACH) became a certified 501(c)3 non-profit. In 2018, TLACT worked with groups including the American Civil Liberties Union of Texas and Equality Texas to support the transgender youth and families through initiatives such as TxTransKids.org. In 2020, TLACH and every other clinic went completely virtual to increase the accessibility.

TLACT provides legal assistance for names and gender marker changes.

== Summary table ==
Same-sex sexual activity legal	Yes (Since 2003)
Equal age of consent (17)	Yes (Since 2003)
Anti-discrimination laws in employment	Yes Both sexual orientation and gender identity federally since 2020. (A constitutional challenge to these protections was filed by Texas in 2022.)
Anti-discrimination laws in housing	No (No state-wide protections)
Anti-discrimination laws in public accommodations	No (No state-wide protections)
Anti-discrimination laws in the provision of goods and services	No (No state-wide protections)
LGBTQ people and materials free from censorship	No Anti-LGBTQ curriculum laws in Texas ban the "promotion" of homosexuality in schools
Hate crime laws include sexual orientation	Yes Rarely invoked (Note: Fewer than one proseuction per year on average is charged as a hate crime in Texas.) (See §Hate crime law)
Hate crime laws include gender identity or expression	No
Same-sex marriages	Yes (Since 2015)
Stepchild adoption by same-sex couples	Yes If legally married
Joint adoption by same-sex couples	Yes If legally married
Access to IVF for lesbians	Yes No legal restriction
Transgender athletes allowed to participate in single-sex sports	No Transgender girls and women barred from girls' and women's sport since 2022
Right to change legal gender	No Not permitted on state-issued documents since 2025 (Note: House Bill 229 or the "What is a Woman Bill", signed into law in 2025, requires that people be defined in state records by the sex they were assigned at birth. Previously, records such as drivers' licenses could have the sex marker altered based on a court order; these are no longer accepted. Employees of the Department of Public Safety (DPS) have been directed to make a record of any court orders or amended birth certificates presented to the DPS in an attempt to have sex markers updated. The reasons for this instruction have not been disclosed, sparking fears that the government intends to use the records to further restrict the rights of transgender individuals.)
Non-binary options on legal documents	No
Gay and trans panic defense abolished	No
Conversion therapy banned	No
Access to transition related healthcare for minors with gender dysphoria	No Not for minors (H.B.1399 makes it illegal to provide gender-affirming care to minors)
Access to transition related healthcare for adults with gender dysphoria	Yes Available for adults
Gay and Lesbian sex criminal records expunged	No
MSMs allowed to donate blood	Yes (Since 2023; behavioral-based screening for all donors)

== See also ==
- Equality Texas
- LGBT rights in the United States
- LGBT rights by country or territory
- List of U.S. state constitutional amendments banning same-sex unions by type
- Law of Texas
- LGBT culture in Dallas-Fort Worth
- LGBT culture in Houston
