= In re Marriage of J.B. and H.B. =

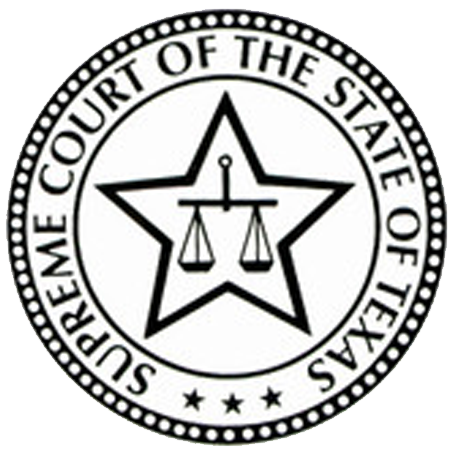
- Court: Supreme Court of Texas
- Full case name: In the Matter of the Marriage of J.B. and H.B.
- Decided: June 19, 2015

Case opinions
- Dismissed as moot

Keywords
- LGBT rights; Same-sex marriage; Sexual orientation discrimination

In the Matter of the Marriage of J.B. and H.B. was a case arising from a divorce petition filed by a same-sex couple in Texas. They had been married in Massachusetts. A Texas Family Court granted the petition, holding that Texas's Proposition 2, which prohibited the court from recognizing a same-sex marriage, violated the due process and equal protection guarantees of the Fourteenth Amendment to the United States Constitution. On appeal, the Fifth Court of Appeals of Texas reversed the family court's judgment, holding that it was consistent with the due process and equal protection clauses. The case was before the Texas Supreme Court, but the case was dismissed due to the death of one of the parties.

== Case history ==
Two men living in Dallas who had married in Massachusetts in September 2006, identified by the courts as J.B. and H.B., filed for a divorce in January 2008 in Dallas County District Court. Their attorney, Peter Schulte, claimed that Article IV Section 1 of the U. S. Constitution, which requires each state to give "full faith and credit" to the legal proceedings of other states, required Texas to recognize a valid Massachusetts marriage. Attorney General Greg Abbott, on behalf of the state of Texas, moved to intervene to block the divorce, claiming that the court lacked subject matter jurisdiction. On October 1, 2009, Dallas District Judge Tena Callahan rejected Texas's intervention and held that the Texas Constitution's ban on same-sex marriage, article I, section 32(a), known as Proposition 2, violated the Fourteenth Amendment's due process and equal protection clauses. Schulte commented: "I have a feeling there are going to be opponents who say this is going to allow the floodgates of gay marriage to open, and I disagree with that. Gay marriage and gay divorce are two separate things." Abbott noted that the definition of marriage that Callahan held unconstitutional had been approved by 75% of Texas voters. It was the second court ruling in U.S. history to find that a state constitution's ban on same-sex marriage violated the U.S. Constitution.

Abbott and Governor Rick Perry appealed to the Fifth Court of Appeals. On August 31, 2010, a unanimous three-judge panel of that court reversed the lower court's ruling and held that the Texas constitution's ban on same-sex marriage does not violate the Equal Protection Clause of the Fourteenth Amendment. It also affirmed the state's right to intervene in the suit. It said that a "same-sex divorce proceeding would give effect to the purported same-sex marriage in several ways" and that "[t]he state has a legitimate interest in promoting the raising of children in the optimal familial setting. It is reasonable for the state to conclude that the optimal familial setting for the raising of children is the household headed by an opposite-sex couple." The court further ruled that district courts in Texas do not have subject-matter jurisdiction to hear a same-sex divorce case. It also held that Texas was not required to recognize a marriage celebrated elsewhere that did not conform to the Texas Constitution, even in the absence of the federal Defense of Marriage Act.

The Fifth Court of Appeals denied en banc review. J.B. sought review from the Texas Supreme Court in February 2011 and that court requested briefs in October. On July 3, 2013, the Texas Supreme Court sua sponte ordered supplemental merits briefing in light of the U.S. Supreme Court decision in United States v. Windsor. On August 23 the Texas Supreme Court agreed to hear the merits and scheduled oral argument for November 5, 2013.

The case was dismissed after one of the parties died while the case was pending.

== See also ==
- Same-sex marriage law in the United States by state
