= Orlando Luis Garcia =

American judge (born 1952)

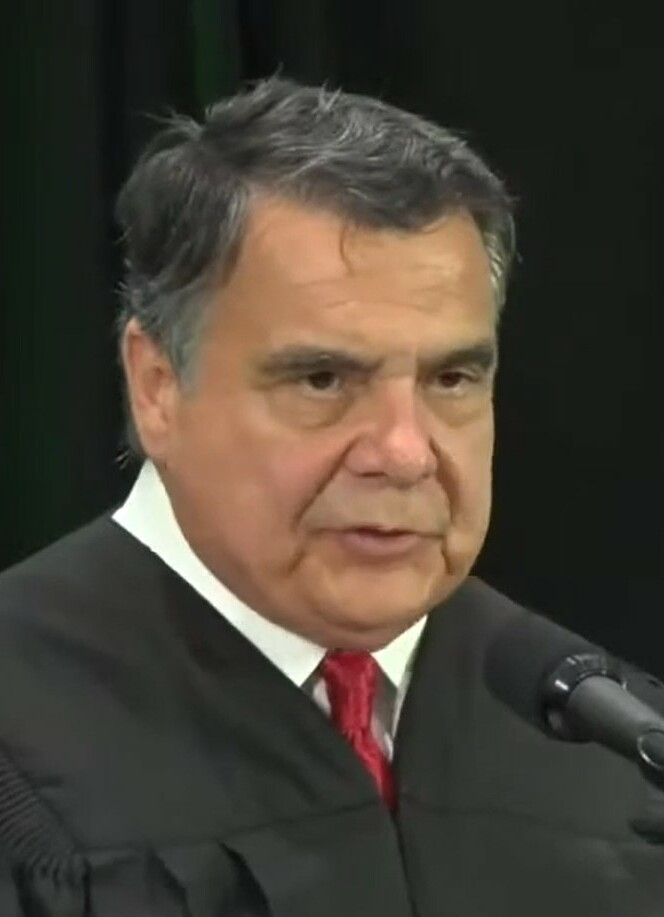
- Garcia in 2019

Chief Judge of the United States District Court for the Western District of Texas
- In office January 1, 2016 – November 18, 2022
- Preceded by: Samuel Frederick Biery Jr.
- Succeeded by: Alia Moses

Judge of the United States District Court for the Western District of Texas
- Incumbent
- Assumed office March 11, 1994
- Appointed by: Bill Clinton
- Preceded by: Emilio M. Garza

Member of the Texas House of Representatives from the 115th district
- In office 1983–1991
- Succeeded by: Leticia R. Van de Putte

Personal details
- Born: 1952 (age 73–74) Jim Wells County, Texas, U.S.
- Party: Democratic
- Education: University of Texas at Austin (BA, JD)

Orlando Luis Garcia (born 1952) is a United States district judge of the United States District Court for the Western District of Texas and former Texas state legislator.

== Education and career ==
Garcia was born in Jim Wells County, Texas. He received a Bachelor of Arts degree from the University of Texas at Austin in 1975 and a Juris Doctor from the University of Texas School of Law in 1978. He was in private practice in San Antonio, Texas from 1978 to 1990, and served in the Texas House of Representatives from 1983 to 1991. From 1991 to 1992 he was a judge of the Texas Fourth Court of Appeals.

=== Federal judicial service ===
Garcia was nominated by President Bill Clinton on November 19, 1993, to a seat vacated by Judge Emilio M. Garza, who was elevated to the United States Court of Appeals for the Fifth Circuit in 1991. Garcia was confirmed by the United States Senate on March 10, 1994, and received his commission on March 11, 1994. He became chief judge on January 1, 2016, and served until November 18, 2022, when he turned 70 years old.

On February 26, 2014, in San Antonio, Garcia overturned the Texas ban on same-sex marriage, ruling that the prohibition is unconstitutional and stigmatizes the relationship of gay couples in the conservative state. He stayed his ruling pending appeal.

In August 2017, Garcia granted a preliminary injunction against Texas Senate Bill 4, which imposed prohibitions against certain local policies relating to illegal immigration. That injunction was reversed in part by the United States Court of Appeals for the Fifth Circuit in May 2018.

As chief judge, starting in 2020, the allegedly litigant-friendly behavior of Judge Alan Albright of the Waco division of the court led to a significant increase in patent filings in that division. Garcia ultimately responded to Albright's behavior by issuing a docket-stripping order that ensured patent cases filed in Waco would be randomly assigned rather than assigned to Albright by default.

== See also ==
- List of Hispanic and Latino American jurists

== Sources ==
Texas House of Representatives
Preceded by Unknown	Member of the Texas House of Representatives from District 115 (San Antonio); 1983–1991	Succeeded by Leticia R. Van de Putte
Legal offices
Preceded by Emilio M. Garza	Judge of the United States District Court for the Western District of Texas; 1994–present	Incumbent
Preceded by Samuel Frederick Biery Jr.	Chief Judge of the United States District Court for the Western District of Texas; 2016–2022	Succeeded by Alia Moses
