= Duval =

Duval or DuVal is a French surname, translating from French to English as "of the valley". It derives from the Norman "Devall", which has both English and French ties. Variant spellings include: Davolls, Deavall, DeVile, Devill, Deville, Divall, Divell and de Eyvill. Its meaning is derived from the French town of Deville, Ardennes. "Devall" was first recorded in England in the Domesday Book.

In France, variant spellings include: Lavalle, Lavallie, Laval, Lavall, Deval, Lavell, Lavelle and Lavielle. The Duval surname has also been spelled some other ways including DeVall, Devoll, DeVol, Duvall, DeValle and Devaulle.

== Notable people ==
- A. Duval, French artist and engraver
- Adrien Duval (born 1990), Mauritian politician
- Aimé Duval (1918–1984), also known as Père Duval, French priest, singer-songwriter, and guitarist
- Albert Duval, French Olympic sailing athlete
- Alexandre-Vincent Pineux Duval (1767–1842), French dramatist, sailor, architect, actor, and theater manager
- Alf Duval (born 1941), Australian rower
- Aline Duval (1824–1903), French stage actress
- Amaury Duval (1760–1838), French lawyer, historian, diplomat, writer, and scholar
- Armand Félix Marie Jobbé-Duval (1821–1889), French painter and politician
- Aurélien Duval (born 1988), French cyclist
- Barry E. DuVal (born 1959), American politician
- Becky Duval Reese, American museum director
- Burr H. Duval (1809–1836), American soldier who died in the Texas Revolution, son of William Pope
- Charles Allen Duval (1810–1872), British portrait painter, photographer, and writer
- Claude Duval (1643–1670), French highwayman
- Clément Duval (1850–1935), French anarchist and criminal
- Clive L. DuVal II (1912–2002), American politician and lawyer
- Consuelo Duval (born 1968), Mexican comedian and actress
- Damon Duval (born 1980), American football player
- Daniel Duval (1944–2013), French actor, film director and screenwriter
- David Duval (born 1971), American golfer
- Denise Duval (1921–2016), French opera singer
- Dennis DuVal (born 1952), American basketball player
- Dominic Duval (c. 1944–2016), American jazz bassist
- Dorinha Duval (1929–2025), Brazilian actress and singer
- Edgar Raoul-Duval (1832–1887), French magistrate and politician
- Edwin M. Duval (born 1947), American literary scholar
- Elsie Duval (1892–1919), British suffragist and campaigner
- Émile Duval (1907–1965), French long-distance runner
- Erik Duval (1965–2016), Belgian computer scientist
- Eugénie Duval (born 1993), French racing cyclist
- Eugène Emmanuel Amaury Duval (1808–1885), better known as Amaury-Duval, French painter
- Franca Duval (1925–2020), American soprano
- François Duval (disambiguation), various people
- Frank Duval (born 1940), German composer, conductor, record producer, songwriter, and singer
- Frantz Duval, Haitian journalist
- Fred DuVal (born 1954), American businessman, civic leader, and author
- Gaël Duval (born 1973), French entrepreneur
- Gaëtan Duval (1930–1996), Mauritian barrister, statesman, and politician
- Georges Duval de Leyrit (fl. 1750s), French colonial governor
- Georges Duval (1772–1853), French playwright
- Georges Duval (journalist) (1847–1919), French playwright and journalist
- Hervé Duval (1932–2004), Mauritian politician
- Isaac H. Duval (1824–1902), American general and politician
- James Duval (born 1972), American actor
- Jean Duval (1597–1669), Roman Catholic prelate, Bishop of Baghdad, and of Ispahan
- Jean-François-Joseph Duval QC (1802–1881), Quebec lawyer, judge, and political figure
- Jean-Jacques Duval (1930–2021), French-born American artist
- Jean-Jacques Duval d'Eprémesnil (1745–1794), French magistrate and politician
- Jeanne Duval (c. 1820 – c. 1862), Haitian-born actress and dancer
- John Crittenden Duval (1816–1897), American writer, son of William Pope
- Joseph Duval (1928–2009), French Roman Catholic archbishop
- Joseph-Odilon Duval (1895–1966), Canadian politician
- Joseph Duval-Jouve (1810–1883), French botanist
- Julien Duval (born 1990), French racing cyclist
- Jules-Alexandre Duval Le Camus (1814–1878), French painter
- Kathleen DuVal, American author and historian
- Léon-Étienne Duval (1903–1996), French prelate and cardinal
- Lil Duval, American comedian
- Loïc Duval (born 1982), French racing driver
- Lucie Duval (born 1959), Canadian artist
- Maïté Duval (1944–2019), French-Dutch sculptor
- Marcel Duval, Canadian air force general
- Maria Duval, Italian-born psychic scammer
- María Duval (born 1937), Mexican actress and singer
- Marie Duval (1847–1890), French cartoonist
- Mathias-Marie Duval (1844–1907), French anatomist and histologist
- Maurice Duval (1869–1958), French general and aviator
- Maurice Raoul-Duval (1866–1916), French polo player
- Michael Raoul Duval (1936–2001), American banker and lawyer
- Michel Duval (born 1994), Mexican actor, singer, songwriter, composer and model
- Miselaine Duval, Mauritian comedian, television producer, and writer
- Mlle Duval (1718–after 1775), French composer
- Noël Duval (1929–2018), French archaeologist
- Norma Duval (born 1956), Spanish actress, presenter, and vedette
- Paulette Duval (1889–1951), French dancer and actress
- Philip Duval (1732–1808), English clergyman
- Pierre Duval, various people
- Portia Duval-Rigby (born 1970), Australian ice dancer
- Richard Duval (born 1968), Mauritian politician
- Raymond Duval (1894–1955), French general
- Robbert Duval (1639–1732), Dutch painter
- Robin Duval (born 1941), British film censor
- Salluste Duval (1872–1917), Canadian doctor, inventor, engineer, musician, and professor of mathematics and mechanics
- Stanwood Duval (born 1942), American judge
- Sunny Duval, Québécois rock guitarist and songwriter
- Sylvie Andrich-Duval (born 1958), Luxembourgish politician
- Thibaut Duval (born 1979), Belgian pole vaulter
- Thomas Howard DuVal (1813–1880), U.S. federal judge, son of William Pope
- Trevon Duval (born 1998), American basketball player
- Una Duval (1879–1975), British suffragette and marriage reformer
- Victoria Duval, American tennis player
- William Duval (ice hockey) (1877–1905), Canadian ice hockey player
- William Pope Duval (1784–1854), American governor of the Florida Territory
- Xavier Barsalou-Duval (born 1988), Canadian politician
- Xavier-Luc Duval (born 1958), Mauritian politician
- Yves Duval (1934–2009), Belgian comics author
- Yvette Duval (1931–2006), Moroccan-born French historian
- Antonio Duvergé Duval (1807–1855), Dominican soldier and general

== Fictional characters ==
- Jason Duval, protagonist in Grand Theft Auto VI
- Dr. Peter Duval, a character in the film Fantastic Voyage
- Emma Duval, a protagonist in the TV series Scream
- Lee Duval, birth name of Elias Voit, a character in the TV series Criminal Minds

== See also ==
- Divall
- Duvall (surname)
