= Lavalle =

Lavalle, LaValle or La Valle may refer to:

== Places ==
=== Argentina ===
- Lavalle, Corrientes, capital of Lavalle Department, Corrientes
- Lavalle, Santiago del Estero, a municipality and village
- General Lavalle, a town
- General Lavalle Partido in Buenos Aires Province
- Lavalle (Buenos Aires Metro), a metro station
- Lavalle Department, Corrientes
- Lavalle Department, Mendoza
- Fortín Lavalle, a village and municipality

=== Italy ===
- La Val (Italian: La Valle), a comune in the province of South Tyrol

=== United States ===
- LaValle, Missouri, an unincorporated community
- La Valle, Wisconsin, a village
- La Valle (town), Wisconsin, the town where the village of La Valle is located
- Lavalle House, a historic home in Florida
- Kenneth P. LaValle Stadium in Stony Brook, New York

== Other uses ==
- Marina Lavalle, a 1965 Mexican telenovela
- Lavalle (surname)

== See also ==
- Laval (disambiguation)
- Lavallee (disambiguation)
