= Devall =

Devall may refer to:

== People ==
- Devall (surname), of Norman origin.
- Deval Patrick (born 1956), American politician

== Places ==
- DeValls Bluff, Arkansas

== See also ==
- Deval (disambiguation)
- Duval (surname)
- Duvall (surname)
- Laval (surname)
