= Duval (disambiguation) =

Duval is a surname of French origin.

Duval may also refer to:

- Duval, a suburb of Armidale, New South Wales, Australia
  - Duval High School, Armidale, New South Wales, Australia
- Duval College, University of New England, Australia
- Duval County (disambiguation)
- Duval Street, Key West, Florida, United States
- Mount Duval (New South Wales), Australia

== See also ==
- Duvall (disambiguation)
- Duvel Moortgat Brewery
- Gen. I.H. Duval Mansion
- Saunier Duval–Prodir, a Spanish-based road bicycle racing team
