= Florence Duval West =

American poet

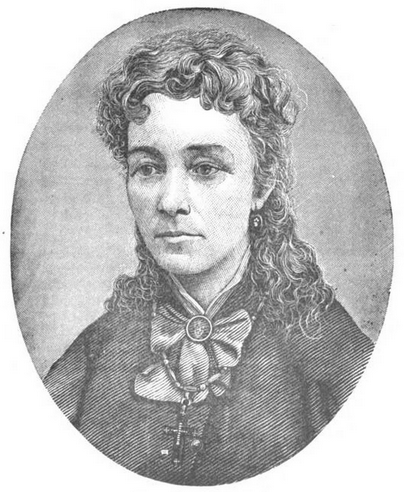
- Born: Florence Randolph Duval; September 1, 1840; Tallahassee, Florida, U.S.
- Died: November 22, 1881 (aged 41); Austin, Texas, U.S.
- Occupation: poet
- Spouse: Charles S. West (m. 1859)
- Children: 4
- Parent: Thomas Howard DuVal
- Relatives: William Pope Duval; Burr Harrison Duval; John Crittenden Duval
- Writing career
- Language: English
- Genre: Southern United States literature
- Notable works: The Land of the Lotus Eaters; The Marble Lily and Other Poems

Florence Duval West (September 1, 1840 – November 22, 1881) was a 19th-century American poet. Her published works include The Land of the Lotus Eaters, and The Marble Lily and Other Poems. As a letter writer, she had few, if any equals.

== Early life and education ==
Florence Randolph Duval was born in Tallahassee, Florida, September 1, 1840. Her paternal grandfather was Gov. William Pope Duval of Florida Territory.

She was a daughter of Judge Thomas Howard DuVal, who successfully practiced his profession of the law until 1857, when he was appointed United States District Judge, filling the office till his death. Two brothers of Judge Duval were also conspicuous in Texas history, Burr Harrison Duval and John Crittenden Duval. Both were in James Fannin's army during the Goliad massacre an event of the Texas Revolution that occurred in 1836.

In 1845, the family removed to Austin, Texas. Gen. Mirabeau B. Lamar, in one of his published "verse memories," wrote fondly about Florence when she was a child. She began singing at the age of thirteen or fourteen for her friends and for the benefit of various charities, her interpretation of old Scotch ballads being unusually happy.

== Career ==
At the age of nineteen, on her birthday, September 1, 1859, she married Charles S. West, a lawyer of the Austin bar, who was a member of the law firm of Hancock, West & North. He served as Associate justice of the Supreme Court of Texas, resigned on account of ill health, and died October 20, 1885. There were four children born in this marriage: a daughter who died in infancy, and three sons, all lawyers, Robert G. West, DuVal West, and William S. West.

West wrote much, but not in any particular order. All of her poems were well-received. She published two books, The Land of the Lotus Eaters, a book of prose sketches, and The Marble Lily and Other Poems (1878). Her poem, "The Marble Lily", originally appeared in the monthly literary magazine The Land We Love. She penned her poems as she sang her songs — without an effort. As a letter writer, she had few, if any equals.

== Personal life ==
During her later years, she suffered greatly. Her father died a year before her death. She died in Austin the morning of November 22, 1881. A sketch of West's life was included in The Living Female Writers of the South [1872], by Ida Raymond. (Note: According to Dewey, Weston & Brown (1880), Ida Raymond is the pseudonym of Mary T. Tardy.)

== Selected works ==
- The Land of the Lotus Eaters
- The Marble Lily and Other Poems
