= Deval =

Deval is a given name, a surname, Gotra of varied origins (Indian and French). It may refer to:

== Surname ==
- Chandra Prakash Deval (born 1949), Indian poet and translator
- Charles Deval (1806–1862), French ophthalmologist
- Govind Ballal Deval (1855–1916), Indian playwright
- Jacques Deval (1895–1972), French screenwriter and director
- John Deval (1701–1774) and namesake son (1728–1794), British sculptors
- Marguerite Deval (1866–1955), French singer and actress
- Pierre Deval (painter) (1897–1993), French painter
- Pierre Deval (diplomat) (1758–1829), French diplomat
- Narayan Singh Dewal (born 1964), Indian politician

== Given name ==
- Deval Eminovski (born 1964), Swedish football player
- Deval Patrick (born 1956), American politician

== Places ==
- Deval Khedi, Village in Madhya Pradesh, India
- Firangi Deval, Temple in Kalsar, Gujarat, India

== See also ==
- Devol (Albania), a former fortress in Albania
- Devall (disambiguation)
- Devall (surname)
- Duval (surname)
- Duvall (surname)
