= Charles S. West =

American judge (1829–1885)

Charles Shannon West (September 24, 1829 – October 23, 1885) was an American jurist and politician in the state of Texas, serving as a state representative, the Texas Secretary of State, and an Associate Justice of the Texas Supreme Court.

== Early life and family ==
A native of Camden, South Carolina, West was educated at Jefferson College (Pennsylvania) and the College of South Carolina. He read law under the mentorship of James Chesnut, Jr., and was admitted to the bar in 1850.

West's brother was John Camden West, a Waco writer and attorney. His sister Catherine was married to John Alexander Green, an Austin lawyer and politician and brother of Confederate General Tom Green. In 1859, West married Florence Randolph DuVal, daughter of Judge Thomas Howard DuVal and granddaughter of Florida Governor William Pope DuVal. They had three sons, all lawyers, including Judge DuVal West, Woodrow Wilson's personal emissary to Mexico.

== Career in Texas ==
West moved to Texas in 1851. As a lawyer in Austin, West made his first partnership with Henry P. Brewster, thus beginning his successful legal career in that city. In 1855 West was elected to the Texas House of Representatives and served one term. During this tenure he established a partnership with Judge John Hancock; their law firm represented the Houston and Texas Central Railway. West was appointed Secretary of State by Governor Francis R. Lubbock but soon left to fight in the Civil War, on the side of the C.S.A. West achieved the rank of major and was Judge Advocate General for the Trans-Mississippi Department. After the war he resumed his practice with Hancock. In the 1870s he worked as one of the six establishing directors of the Agricultural and Mechanical College of Texas, and was a delegate to the Texas Constitutional Convention in 1875. He was appointed to the Supreme Court of Texas in December 1882 and resigned in September 1885. He died in Austin and is buried in Oakwood Cemetery.

Political offices
Preceded by Bird Holland	Secretary of State of Texas; 1861-1862	Succeeded by Robert W. Townes
