= Lavalle (surname) =

Lavalle or LaValle is a Spanish surname. Notable people with the surname include:

- Juan Lavalle (1797–1841), Argentine military and political figure
- José María Lavalle (1902–1984), Peruvian football forward
- María Lavalle Urbina (1908–1996), Mexican lawyer and politician
- Paul Lavalle (1908–1997), American conductor, composer, arranger and musician
- Ramón Lavalle (1909–1968), Argentine diplomat and journalist
- Víctor Lavalle (1911–1975), Peruvian Olympic football player
- Adolfo Guido Lavalle (1912–?), Argentine Olympic fencer
- Josefina Lavalle (1924–2009), Mexican ballet dancer, choreographer and ballet director
- Dagoberto Lavalle (1925–1991), Peruvian footballer
- Gerald LaValle (1932-2018), American politician
- Kenneth LaValle (born 1939), American politician
- Leonardo Lavalle (born 1967), Mexican Olympic tennis player
- Steven M. LaValle (born 1968), American computer scientist
- Victor LaValle (born 1972), American author
- Jorge Luis Lavalle Maury (born 1975), Mexican politician

== See also ==
- Lavalle (disambiguation)
