= Laval =

Laval means The Valley in old French and is the name of:

== People ==
- House of Laval, a French noble family originating from the town of Laval, Mayenne
- Laval (surname)

== Places ==
=== Belgium ===
- Laval, a village in the municipality of Sainte-Ode, Luxembourg Province.

=== Canada ===
- Laval, Quebec, a city and an administrative region coextensive with the city in southern Quebec, Canada, part of the Montreal area
  - Îles Laval, an archipelago within the limits of the above city
  - Laval (federal electoral district), former riding in Canada
  - Laval (provincial electoral district), former provincial riding in Quebec
- Université Laval, a university in Quebec City
  - Laval Rouge et Or, the university's varsity sports program

=== France ===
- Arrondissement of Laval, an arrondissement in the Mayenne department in the Pays de la Loire region
- Laval, Mayenne, a commune in the Mayenne department
- Laval-Atger, a commune in the Lozère department
- Laval-d'Aix, a commune in the Drôme department
- Laval-d'Aurelle, a commune in the Ardèche department
- Laval-de-Cère, a commune in the Lot department
- Laval-du-Tarn, a commune in the Lozère department
- Laval-en-Belledonne, a commune in the Isère department
- Laval-en-Brie, a commune in the Seine-et-Marne department
- Laval-en-Laonnois, a commune in the Aisne department
- Laval-le-Prieuré, a commune in the Doubs department
- Laval-Morency, a commune in the Ardennes department
- Laval-Pradel, a commune in the Gard department
- Laval-Roquecezière, a commune in the Aveyron department
- Laval-Saint-Roman, a commune in the Gard department
- Laval-sur-Doulon, a commune in the Haute-Loire department
- Laval-sur-Luzège, a commune in the Corrèze department
- Laval-sur-Tourbe, a commune in the Marne department
- Laval-sur-Vologne, a commune in the Vosges department
- Bonchamp-lès-Laval, a commune in the Mayenne department
- Le Poët-Laval, a commune in the Drôme department
- Magnac-Laval, a commune in the Haute-Vienne department
- Mont-de-Laval, a commune in the Doubs department
- Saint-Genis-Laval, a commune in the Rhône department
- Saint-Germain-Laval, Loire, a commune in the Loire department
- Saint-Germain-Laval, Seine-et-Marne, a commune in the Seine-et-Marne department
- Saint-Pierre-Laval, a commune in the Allier department
- Viols-en-Laval, a commune in the Hérault department

== Other ==
- Laval (Legends of Chima), a character in Legends of Chima
- Stade Lavallois, an association football club in France

== See also ==
- La Val, a comune in South Tyrol, Italy
- Lavalle (disambiguation)
- Leval (disambiguation)
