= La Vallée =

La Vallée may refer to:

- La Vallée, Charente-Maritime, a town in France
- La Vallée, Haiti, a municipality in Haiti
- La Vallée District, Switzerland
- La Vallee, Ontario, Canada
- La Vallee, United States Virgin Islands
- La Vallée (film), a 1972 French film
- * Obscured by Clouds, soundtrack to the film by English rock band Pink Floyd

== See also ==
- Lavallee
- Vallée (disambiguation)
