= Devall (surname) =

Devall (also DeValle) is a surname of French ties. Variant spellings include: Davolls, Deavall, DeVile, Devill, Deville, Divall, Divell and Evill. Its meaning is derived from French the town of Deville, Ardennes.

In France, the surname is derived from 'de Val' meaning 'of the valley.' Variant spellings include: Lavalle, Lavallie, Laval, Lavall, Deval, Duval, Lavell, Lavelle and Lavielle. The Devall surname has also been spelled some other ways including Devoll, DeVol, Duvall, DeValle and Devaulle.

Notable people with the surname include:

- Danny DeVall (born 1972), Football player
- Dave Devall (born 1931), Canadian weather reporter.
- Denzel Devall (born 1994), American football player
- Trevor Devall (born 1972), Canadian voice actor

== See also ==
- Deval (disambiguation)
- Devall (disambiguation)
- Duval (surname)
- Duvall (surname)
- Laval (surname)
