= Domenico Della-Maria =

Italian composer (1768–1800

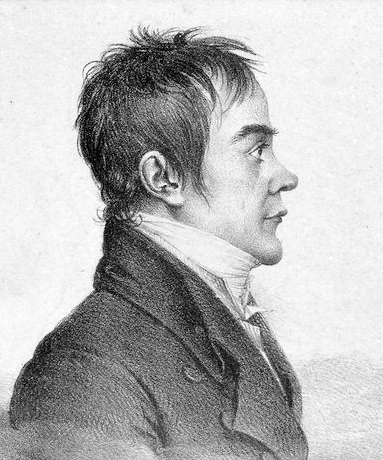
Domenico Della Maria on a lithograph by Godefroy Engelmann

Domenico Della Maria (1768 – 9 March 1800) was a mandolin virtuoso and dramatic composer of operas.

== Early years ==
Domenico Della Maria was born in Marseille in 1768. He was the son of Italian parents. His father Domenico was a roving mandolin player, who with his wife and friends formed an itinerant company of musicians—mandolinists, guitarists, and vocalists. During their wanderings they visited Marseille, where their playing and singing attracted more than ordinary attention. This success induced Della Maria and his wife to settle in this city, where they first commenced to teach their instruments, Domenico was born. He was taught the mandolin while a child, and a few years later he received instruction on the violoncello. He appeared publicly as an infant prodigy upon both instruments. When he was eighteen years of age Della Maria wrote his first opera, it being performed in the theatre of his native town. This work caused a great sensation among musicians of Marseille, as bearing the stamp of genius. After this success, Della Maria travelled through Italy as a mandolinist and violoncellist and did not continue his musical education until he came under the influence of Paisiello in Naples, some years later. He was engaged in Naples as violoncellist and mandolinist in the orchestra of the Royal Chapel, under the direction of Giovanni Paisiello. Della Maria became aware of his own lack of knowledge immediately he became associated with the concert master and studied diligently under Paisiello for a considerable period. This began a lifelong friendship between the two. Paisiello manifested more than ordinary interest in his talented pupil, the mandolin virtuoso, and had shown his appreciation of the musical value of the instrument by employing it in the score of his opera, Il barbiere di Siviglia (The Barber of Seville), which had been composed a few years previously in Saint Petersburg.

== Alexandre Duval and The Prisoner ==
Della Maria, resided in Italy for about ten years, during the latter part of which period he wrote light works for numerous secondary Italian theatres. He produced six operas, three of which were fairly successful, and one of the remainder, Il maestro di capella, exceedingly so; its popularity brought fame to its author. In 1796, Della Maria returned to Marseille, and later that year in Paris. He was absolutely unknown, but in a very short time his reputation was such that he found himself the guest and friend of the most renowned in literary and musical circles. The poet, Alexander Duval (1767–1842), wrote a complimentary article in the Decade Philosophique, concerning the young artist, and a few years later the two were most intimately associated. Duval mentions that one of his personal friends, to whom Della Maria had been introduced, requested him to write some poem for the musician. Duval acting upon the earnest suggestion of his friend, made an appointment with Della Maria. This interview proved to be the commencement of a productive friendship; in Duval's words, Della Maria's classical, soulful countenance and his natural and original demeanor inspired a confidence in the poet that was found to be entirely justified. Duval had just completed Le prisonnier (The Prisoner), which had been commissioned for the Theatre Français; however, the desire to gratify the request of Della Maria convinced him to write an opera. After a few alterations and additions, Duval transformed the work to a lyric comedy. Within eight days after receiving the libretto, Della Maria composed the music. The artists of the opera were so enthusiastic about the work during its rehearsals that its success was assured. It was performed on 29 January 1798 and the opera was published by Breitkopf & Härtel, Leipzig. It established the name of Della Maria throughout France as an operatic composer of repute, for he immediately brought out six other operas, his works being now great favourites with Parisians.

The brilliant success of The Prisoner, was due to two primary causes, the first of which was the melodiousness and simplicity of the vocal parts, under a duly subservient and subdued skilful orchestration, while the second factor was his most fortunate choice of artists responsible for the principal characters. The actresses, Mile. St. Aubin, and Mile. Dugazon, found in the opera, parts analogous to their natural dispositions, and their names were popularized throughout France by their interpretations.

== Other operas ==
In this opera, Della Maria did not rise to extraordinary powerful conceptions; but his style was original, and this individuality was noticeable in all his compositions. Unfortunately, his style tended towards weakening in several of his later operas. He enjoyed an amount of success with: The Uncle Valet and The Ancient Castle, but Jacquot (The school of mothers) (1797) and The House of Marais were both short lived. La Fausse Duegne (The false wife) was left unfinished by the sudden death of Della Maria, and in 1802 Blangini was commissioned to complete the work.

== End of life ==
These operas were written within the space of four years, and in this brief time, Della Maria seems to have exhausted all his natural resources. Being of a genial and sociable disposition, Della Maria had made many friends. Duval, the poet, was one of the most sincere. They had only completed arrangements for retiring to the country together, intending to write a new opera, when Della Maria died on 9 March 1800 in Paris, seized by an illness and fell in the Rue St. Honoré. He was assisted to an adjacent house by a passing stranger, where he expired a few hours later without regaining consciousness. As no trace of his identity could be obtained, the police instituted enquiries, and several days elapsed before his friends could be informed of the sad event. He was thirty-two when he died, a young and brilliant musician.

Della Maria was a mandolin virtuoso, who wrote much for his instrument, and, like his master, Paisiello, made frequent use of it in his orchestral scores. Several of his church compositions were published by Costallat, Paris, and he left many unpublished works, consisting of church and instrumental pieces, and mandolin sonatas, which, with his mandolin and violoncello, were preserved in the home of his parents in Marseille.
