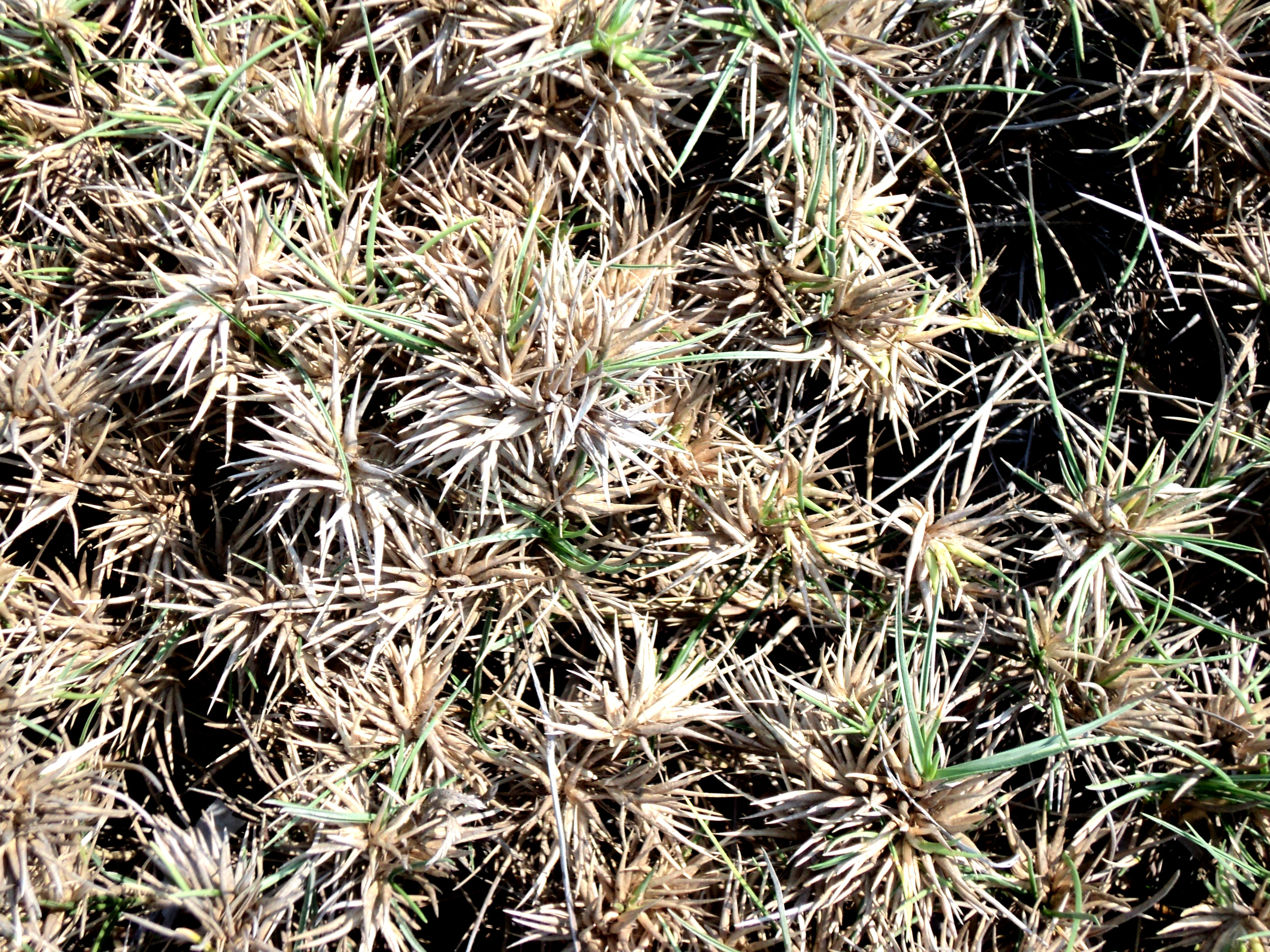
- Jouvea pilosa

Scientific classification
- Kingdom: Plantae
- Clade: Tracheophytes
- Clade: Angiosperms
- Clade: Monocots
- Clade: Commelinids
- Order: Poales
- Family: Poaceae
- Subfamily: Chloridoideae
- Tribe: Cynodonteae
- Genus: Jouvea; E.Fourn.

Type species
- Jouvea straminea E.Fourn.

Synonyms
- Rhachidospermum Vasey

= Jouvea =

Genus of grasses

Jouvea is a Latin American genus of coastal plants in the grass family. It grows on mud flats and coastal sand dunes from northern Mexico to Ecuador.

Jouvea's closest relative in the subfamily Chloridoideae is likely Monanthochloe; both share the characteristic of distichously arranged leaves, and both are dioecious.

Jouvea was named for the French botanist Joseph Duval-Jouve (1810–1883)

Species

- Jouvea pilosa (J.Presl) Scribn. – Central America (Guatemala to Nicaragua), Mexico (Tamaulipas, Baja California Sur, Sonora, Sinaloa, Jalisco, Nayarit, Guerrero, Michoacán, Colima, Oaxaca, Chiapas, Yucatán)
- Jouvea straminea E.Fourn. – Ecuador, Colombia, Central America (Guatemala to Panama), Mexico (Socorro Island, Chiapas, Oaxaca, Michoacán, Guerrero, Jalisco, Sinaloa, Nayarit)
