= Eugène Emmanuel Amaury Duval =

French painter (1808–1885)

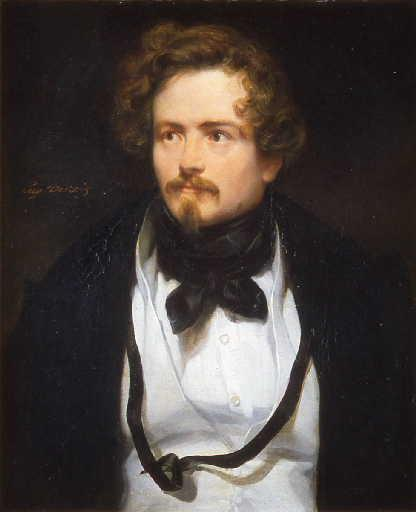
Portrait of Amaury-Duval by Eugène Devéria, Musée Rolin, Autun.

Eugène Emmanuel Amaury Pineux Duval (16 April 1808 – 25 December 1885), better known by the pseudonym Amaury-Duval, was a French painter. He was one of two sons of Amaury Duval (1760–1838) and thus a nephew of the playwright Alexandre-Vincent Pineux Duval.

== Life ==
He was born in Montrouge. One of the first students in Jean Auguste Dominique Ingres's studio (a strong influence on all Duval's works), Duval took part in the 1829 artists' and scholars' expedition sent by Charles X of France to Greece as the Morea Expedition to produce its archaeological drawings. He first exhibited at the Paris Salon of 1833 with many portraits such as his Green Lady (no longer extant) and his Self-portrait (still to be seen in the musée des Beaux-Arts de Rennes). In 1834 he exhibited his "Greek shepherd discovering an antique bas-relief". From 1834 to 1836 he took a long Grand Tour to Florence, Rome, and Naples, where he discovered Italian Renaissance art. On returning to France he was one of the artists commissioned to decorate churches by the government of Louis-Philippe then Napoleon III – the Sainte Philomène chapel at the église Saint-Merry (1840–1844), the chapel of the virgin at Saint-Germain-l'Auxerrois in Paris (1844–1846) then the parish church of Saint-Germain-en-Laye (1849–1856). He also published his memoirs. He died in Paris on Christmas Day, 1885.

== Appraisal ==
Baudelaire fiercely criticised the Duval and Ingres school:

In general, Mr FLANDRIN, Mr AMAURY-DUVAL and Mr LEHMAN, have an excellent quality, and their modelling is true and fine. Their taste is well-conceived, facilely executed and all of a breath; but their portraits are often tainted by a pretentious and maladroit affectedness. Their immoderate taste for distinction puts them to bad turns at every instant. It is known with what admirable bonhomie they researched their distinguished tones, that is to say the tones which (even if they are intense) scream like the devil and holy water, like marble and vinegar; but when they are excessively pale and take a homeopathic dose, the effect is more surprising than sad: there is their grand triumph!

== Works ==
76 paintings and drawings by Duval are known, including the following:

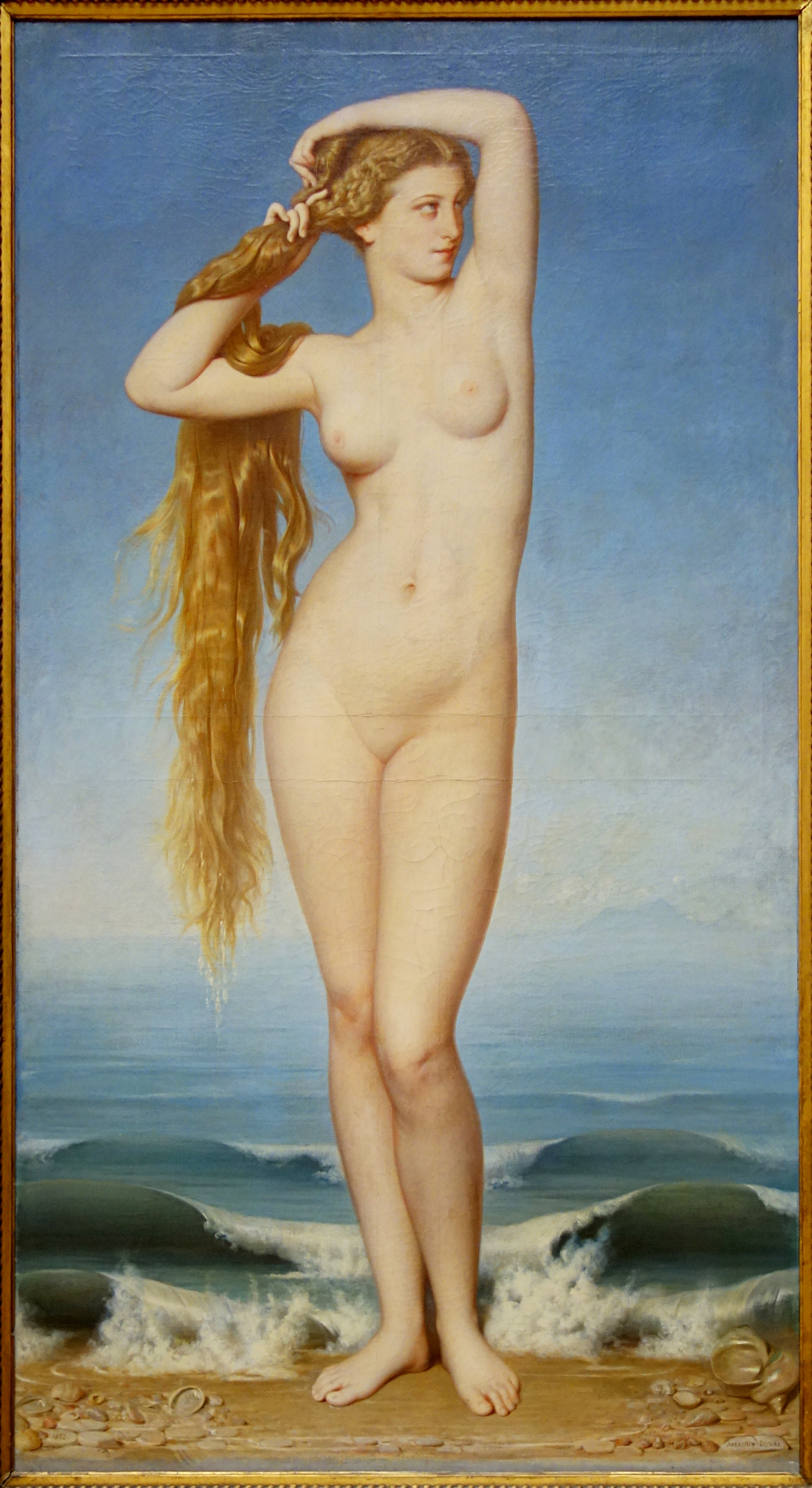
The Birth of Venus, 1862, oil on canvas, Palais des Beaux-Arts de Lille

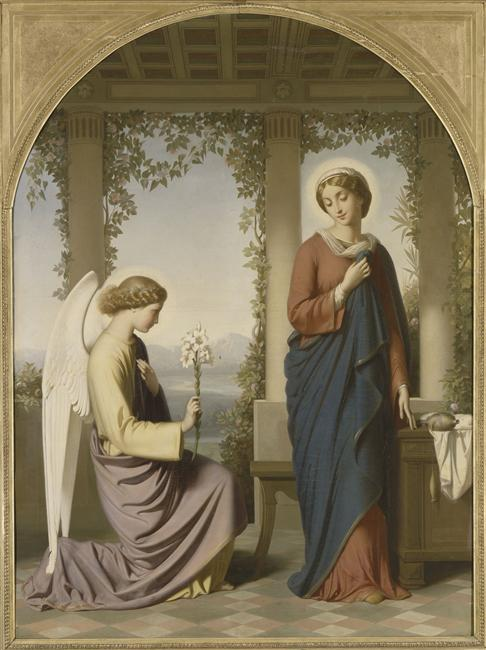
Annunciation

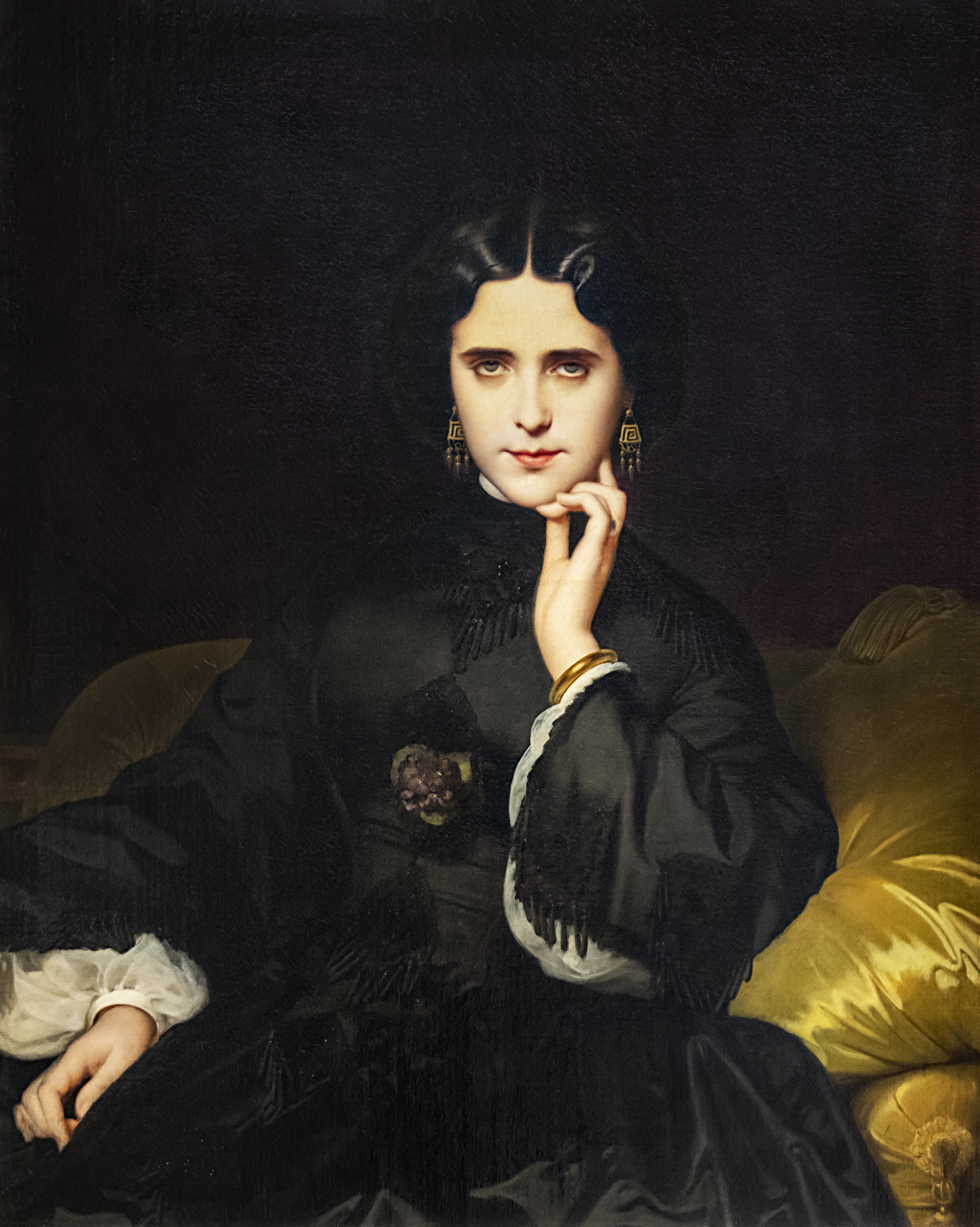
Madame de Loynes (Jeanne Détourbay), 1862, oil on canvas, Musée d'Orsay

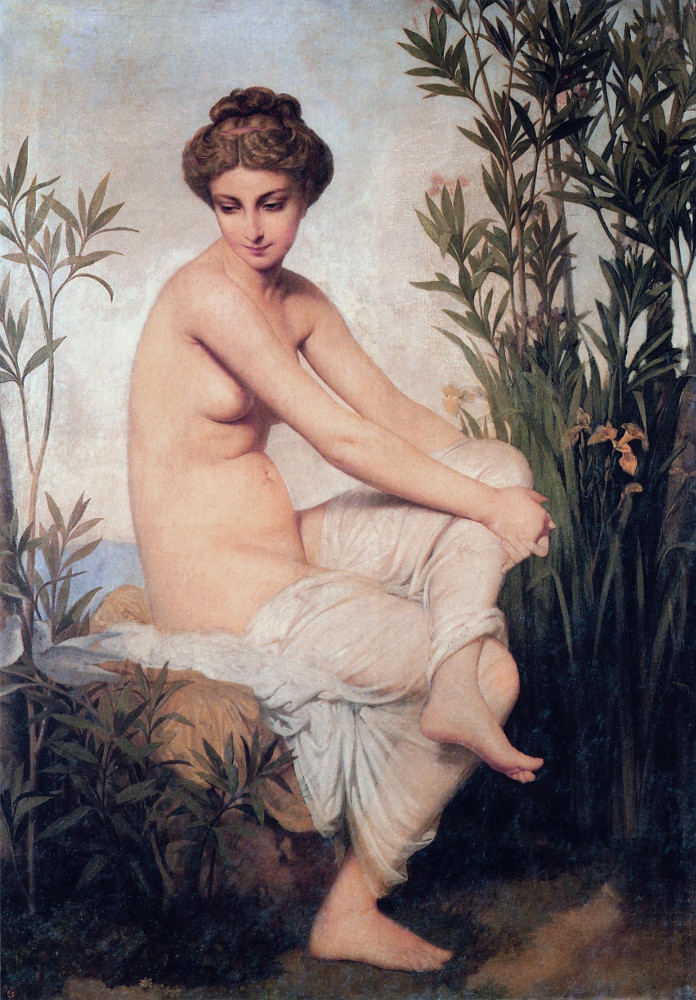
Ancient bather

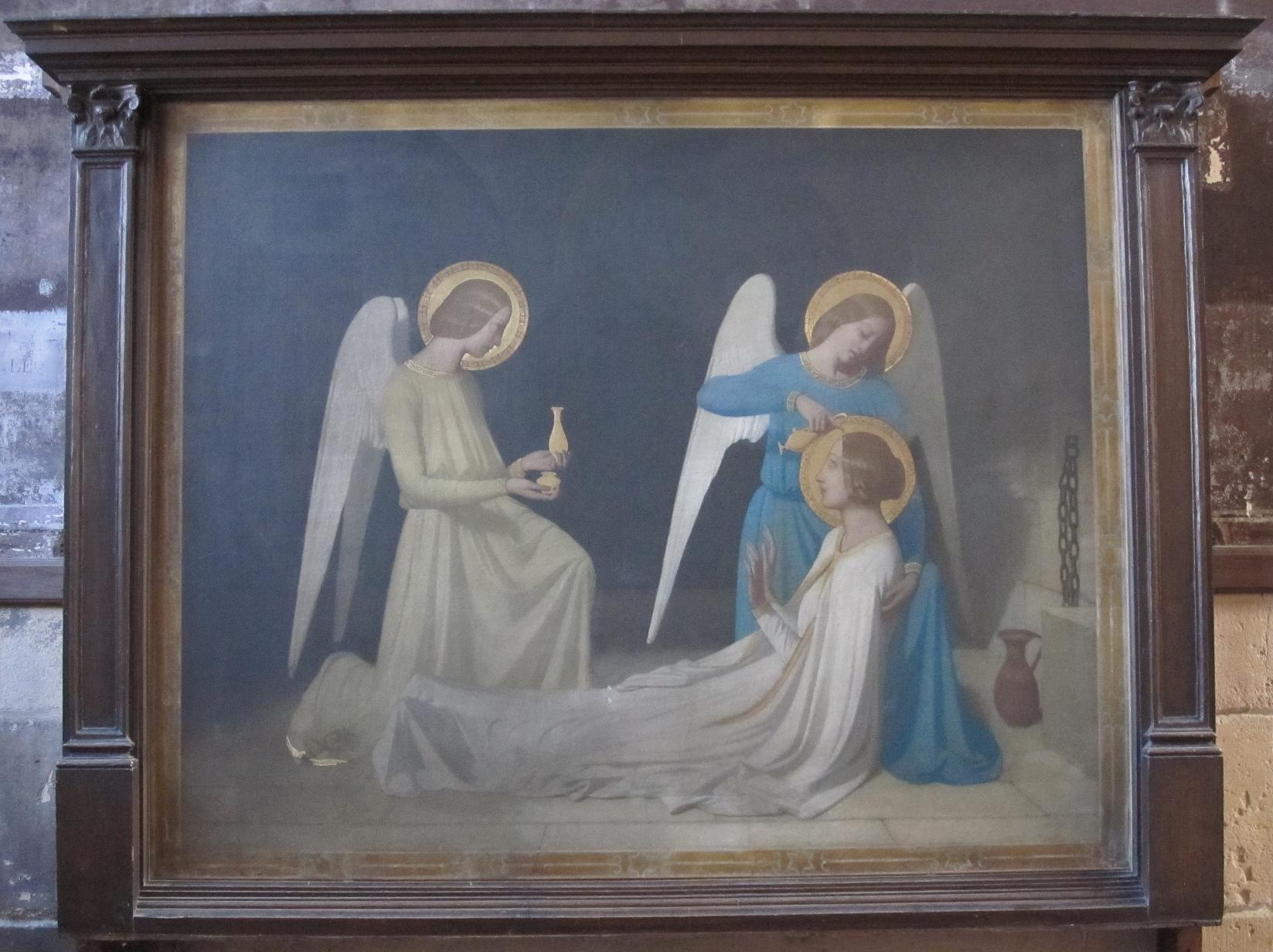
Saint Filomena

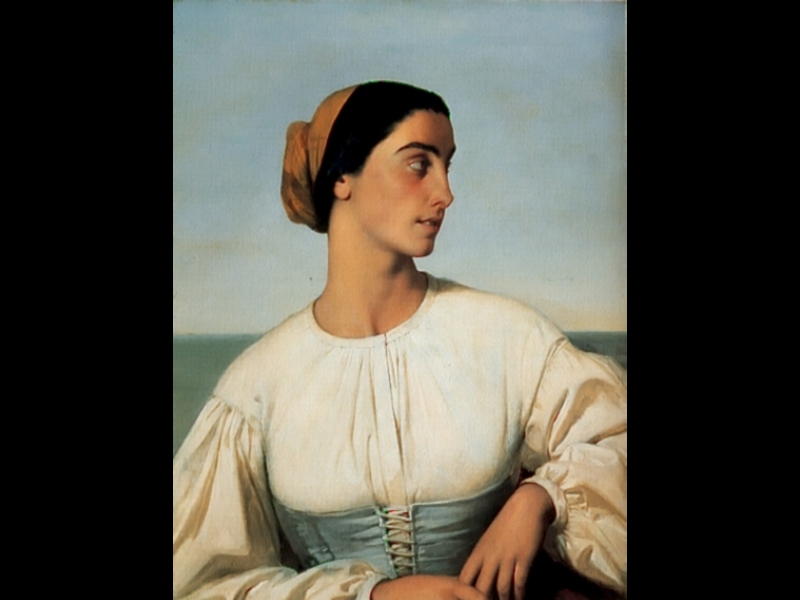
Woman from St. Jean de Luz

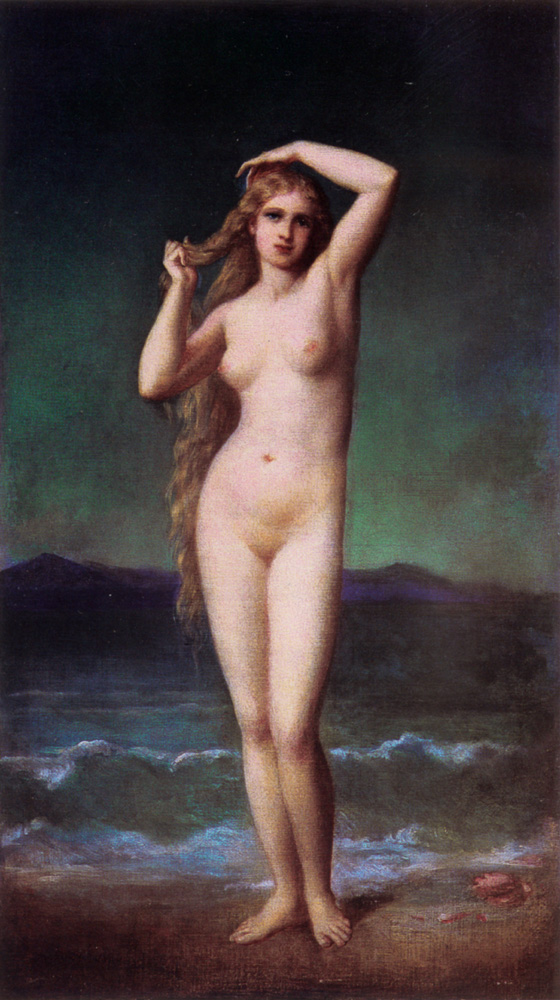
The bather, destroyed during World War II

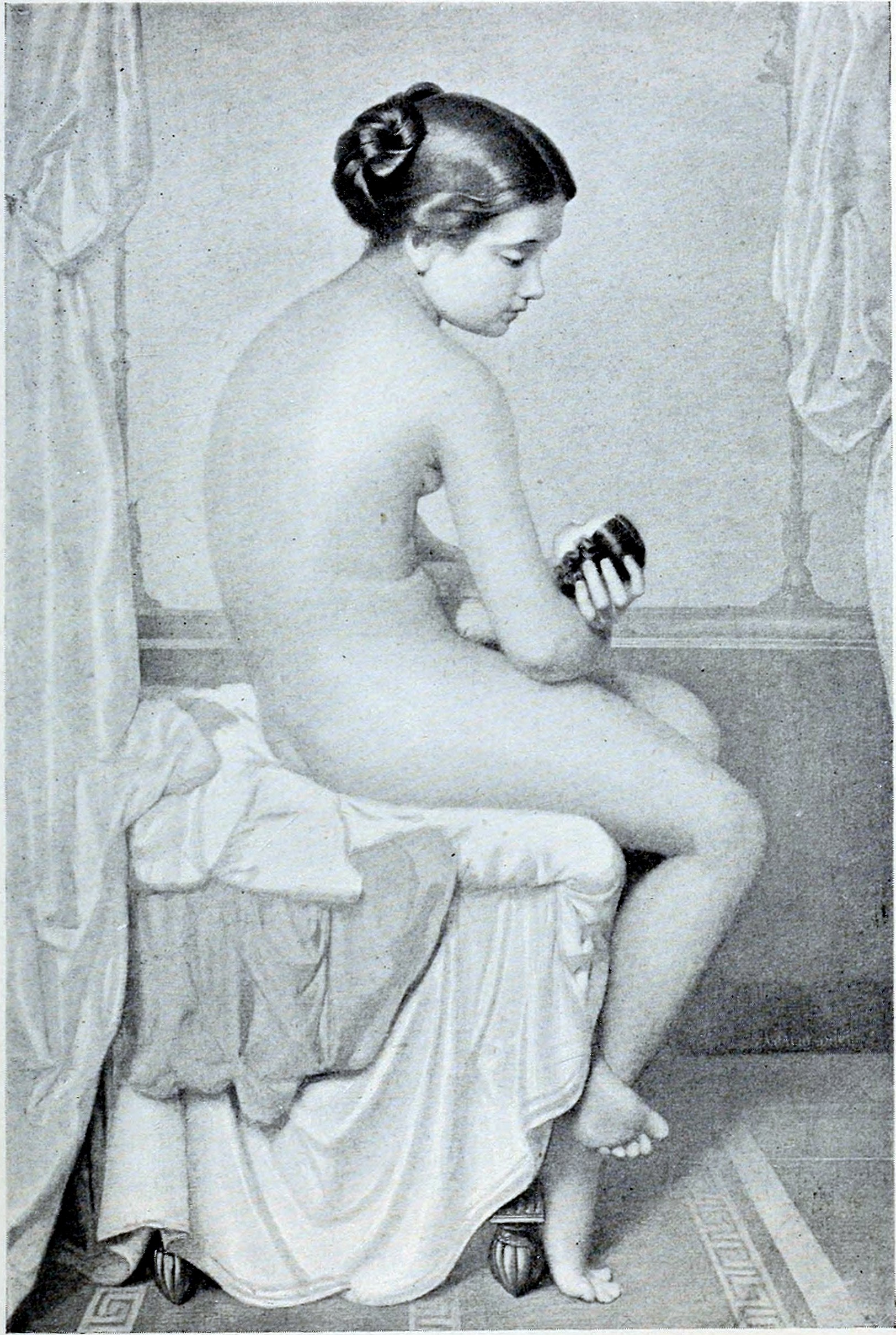
Study of a child, destroyed 1940

== Sources ==
- Dictionnaire de biographie française
