= Divall =

Divall is a surname. Notable people with this surname include:

- Dick Divall (1926–1982), Bermudian sailor
- Richard Divall (1945–2017), Australian conductor and musicologist

== See also ==
- Duval
