= Laval (surname) =

Laval is a French surname and an alternative spelling of "Duval", which literally translates from French to English as "of the valley". It derives from the Norman "Devall", which has both English and French ties. Variant spellings include: Davolls, Deavall, DeVile, Devill, Deville, Divall, Divell and Evill. Its meaning is derived from the French town of Deville, Ardennes. The spelling, "Devall", was first recorded in England in the Domesday Book.

In France, variant spellings include: Lavalle, Lavallie, Lavall, Deval, Lavell, Lavelle and Lavielle. The Laval surname has also been spelled some other ways including Duvall, DuVall, DeVall, Devoll, DeVol, DeValle and Devaulle.

Notable people with the surname include:

- Anne Gilbert de Laval (1762–1810), French general of the Napoleonic Wars
- Billy Laval (1885–1957), American minor league baseball player, baseball manager, and college baseball, football, and basketball coach
- Erik de Laval (1888–1973), Swedish modern pentathlete
- François de Laval (1623–1708), the first bishop of Quebec City
- Georg de Laval (1883–1970), Swedish modern pentathlete, brother of Erik and Patrik
- Gustav de Laval (1845–1913), Swedish engineer
- Jacques-Désiré Laval (1803–1864), French Roman Catholic priest and missionary
- John Laval (1854–1937), French-born Catholic bishop in the United States
- Patrik de Laval (1886–1974), Swedish modern pentathlete, brother of Erik and Georg
- Pierre Laval (1883–1945), prime minister of France at various times

== See also ==
- Devall (surname)
- Duval (surname)
- Duvall (surname)
