= Leval =

Leval may refer to:

- Leval, Nord, a commune in the Nord-Pas-de-Calais region of France
- Leval, Territoire de Belfort, a commune in the Franche-Comté region of France
- Leval-Trahegnies, a town in the Hainaut province of Belgium

See also

- Le Val (disambiguation)
- Laval (disambiguation)
