= Le Val =

Le Val may refer to the following places in France:

- Le Val, Doubs, a commune in the Doubs department
- Le Val, Var, a commune in the Var department

== See also ==
- Le VAL (Véhicule Automatique Léger), a driverless people mover
- Leval (disambiguation)
