= François Duval (disambiguation) =

François Duval (born 1980) is a Belgian rally driver.

François Duval may also refer to:

- François Duval (dancer) (born 1743), known as Malter, was French dancer
- François Duval (politician) (1903–1984), politician from Martinique who served in the French Senate
