= Lavallee =

Lavalee, Lavallée or LaVallee may refer to:

- Lavallée, France
- Lavallée Lake, Canada
- Lavallee Peak, Antarctica
- R. v. Lavallee, a Canadian court case

== People with the surname ==
- Alphonse Lavallée (1791–1873), founder École Centrale Paris, France
- Calixa Lavallée (1842–1891), songwriter, "O Canada"
- Carole Lavallée (1954–2021), Canadian politician
- Charles Jean de la Vallée Poussin (1866–1962), Belgian mathematician
- Jordan LaVallee (born 1986), American ice hockey player
- Kevin LaVallee (born 1961), Canadian ice hockey player
- Levi LaVallee (born 1982), American snowmobile racer
- Louis-Arsène Lavallée (1861–1936), Canadian politician, Mayor of Montreal
- Maxym Lavallée (born 1998), Canadian flag football player
- Roger Lavallee, American musician and producer
- Théophile-Sébastien Lavallée (1804–1867), French historian and geographer

== See also ==
- La Vallée (disambiguation)
- Lavalle (disambiguation) or La Valle
