= Lavalle, Corrientes =

Lavalle Sánta Lusía (Guarani)
- Town
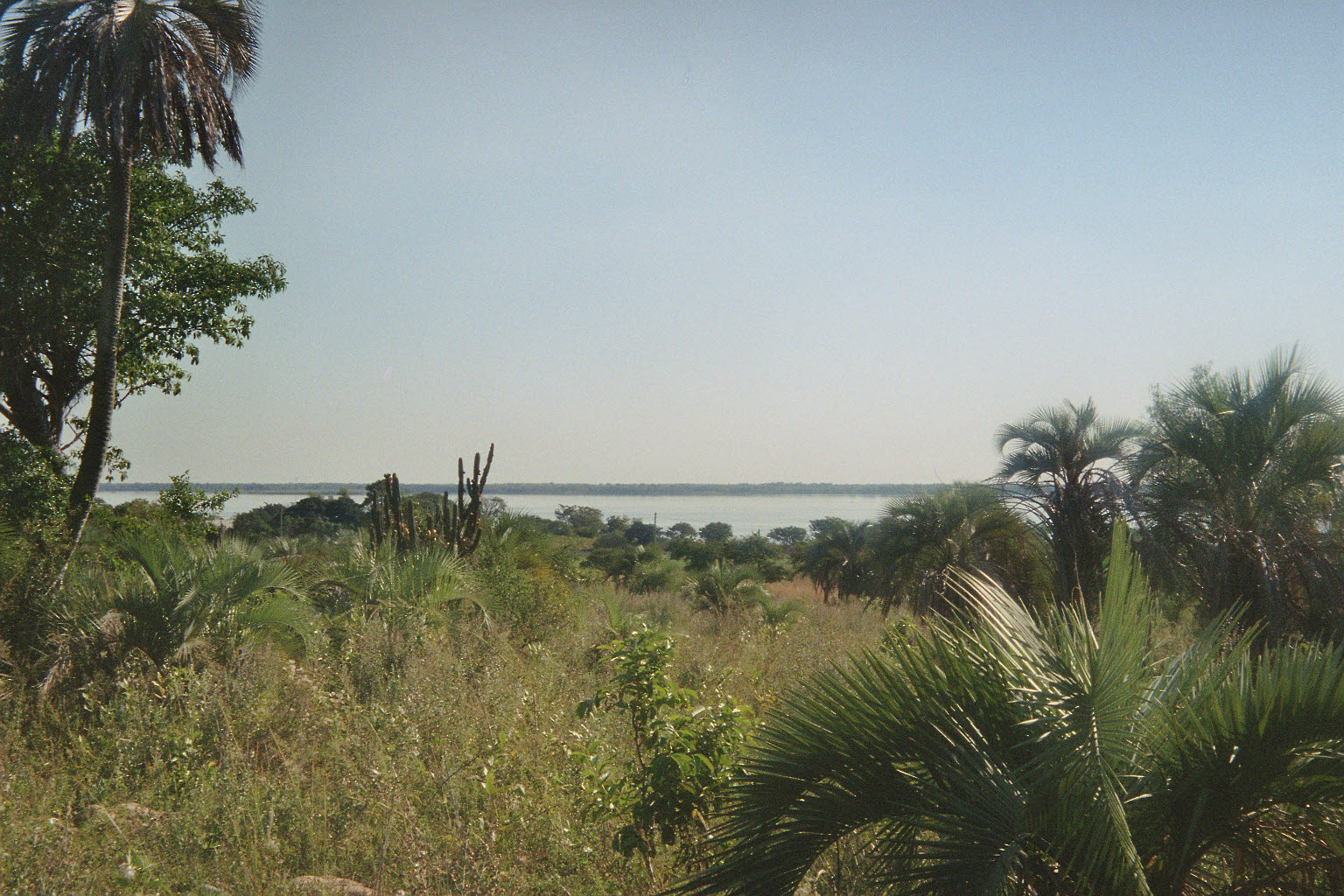
- View of the Paraná River from Lavalle

- Location of Lavalle in Argentina
- Coordinates: 29°11′S 56°39′W
- Country: Argentina
- Province: Corrientes
- Department: Lavalle Department
- Elevation: 33 m (108 ft)

Population
  - Total: 4,783
- Demonym: Lavallense
- Time zone: UTC−3 (ART)
- CPA base: W3443
- Dialing code: +54 2965

Lavalle (Guarani: Sánta Lusía) is a town in Corrientes Province, Argentina. It is the capital of Lavalle Department. It is located on the banks of the Paraná River, between the cities of Goya and Santa Lucía. It is located 207 kilometers from the provincial capital.

On December 13, 1616, Hernado Arias de Saavedra (Hernandarias) founded Santa Lucía de los Astos (by local Indians). origin of the head town of the department. The continuous attack by the indigenous people forced the transfer of the settlement. On December 13, 1717, the second foundation of the town took place, this time on the right bank of the Mepeme River (today known as Santa Lucía).

In 1793 the church was declared a National Historical Monument. The final name of the district remembers Galo Lavalle, who carried out the last foundation in 1863.

The municipal organic charter establishes:

ARTICLE 4: Denomination, Anniversaries and Religious Worship. The Municipality of Lavalle takes the name “LAVALLE” as its own, for its political, institutional, economic, financial and social identity, without prejudice to the use of the name “PUERTO LAVALLE” in protocol acts.

In this town the San Alberto Monastery is located, where a female contemplative community of the Dominican Order lives.

Above this city and with respect to the pacts and negotiations concluded by the Governments of the provinces of Corrientes and Santa Fe, the head of a bridge will be located that will unite both provinces, also connecting this city with its Santa Fe counterpart of Avellaneda. The construction of this bridge in this region will facilitate the interconnection of both provinces, in addition to serving as an exit route for city traffic and cargo transportation from that part of both provinces, also freeing the traffic flow of the General Bridge Manuel Belgrano, located several kilometers to the north and which unites the provinces of Chaco and Corrientes.

== Population ==
As of 2010, it has 2,990 inhabitants, which represents an increase of 27.5% compared to the 2,345 of the previous 2001 census.

Historical population
| Year | Pop. | ±% |
|---|---|---|
| 1991 | 1,412 | — |
| 2001 | 2,345 | +66.1% |
| 2010 | 2,990 | +27.5% |
Source: Source of the National Censuses of INDEC

== Geography ==
Lavalle is located at an altitude of 33 m (108 ft) (29°01′00″S 59°10′59″W) near the Paraná River between the cities of Goya and Santa Lucía.

== Parish of the Catholic Church in Lavalle ==
Catholic Church
| Diocese | Goya |
|---|---|
| Pastoral unity | Our Lady of Perpetual Help |
