= Duvall =

Duvall may refer to:

== Bands ==
- Duvall, a pop/rock band signed to Asian Man Records

== Places ==
United States

- Duvall, Ohio, an unincorporated community
- Duvall, Washington, a city
- Duvall, Wisconsin, an unincorporated community

== Surnames ==
- Duval (surname), people with the surname Duval
- Duvall (surname), people with the surname Duvall or DuVall
