= General San Martín (Buenos Aires Underground) =

Buenos Aires Underground station

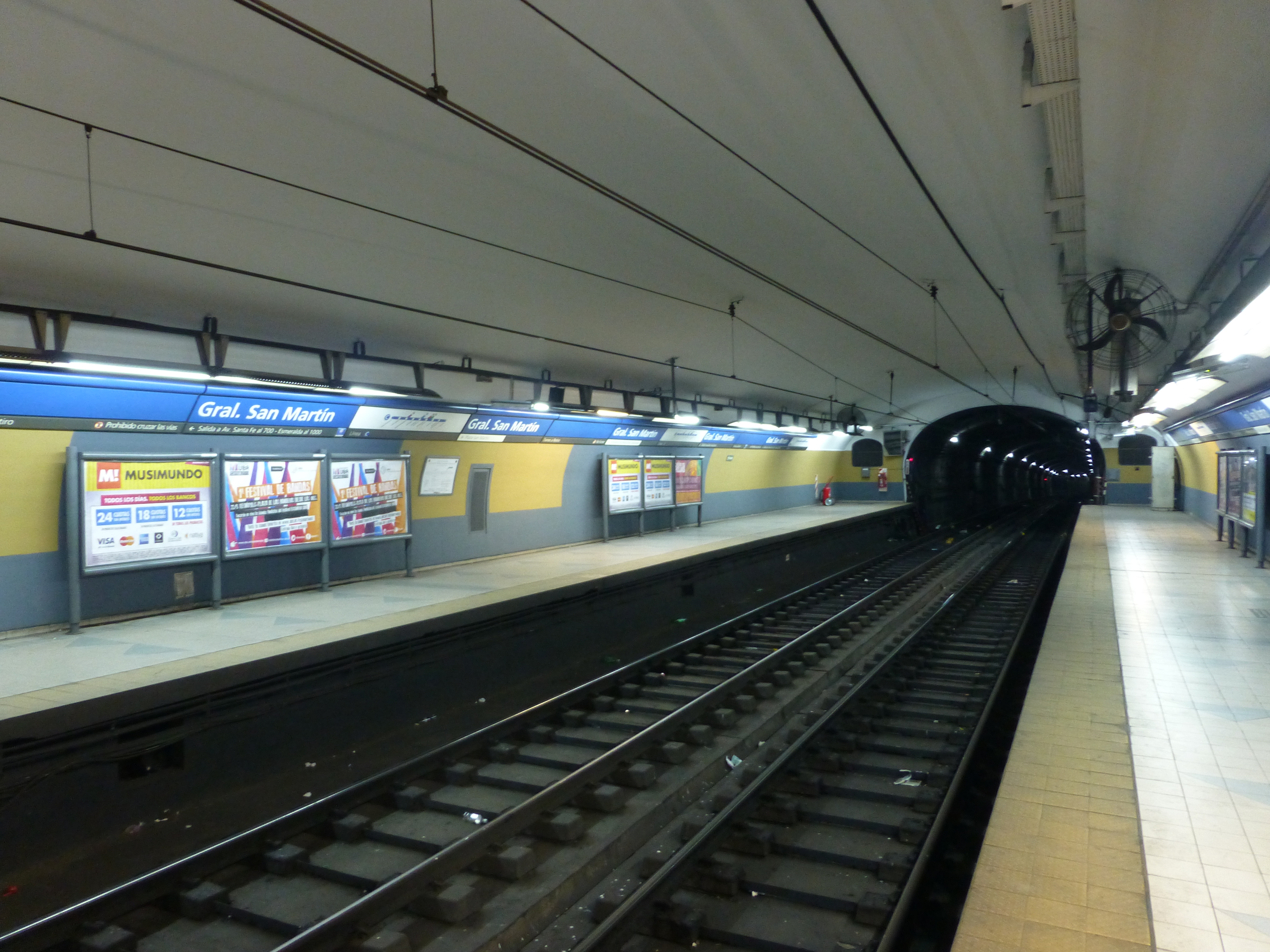

General information
- Location: Santa Fe and Esmeralda
- Coordinates: 34°35′42.3″S 58°22′40.4″W
- Platforms: Side platforms

History
- Opened: 17 August 1937

Services
Preceding station	Buenos Aires Underground	Following station
Retiro Terminus	Line C	Lavalle towards Constitución
Location

General San Martín is a station on Line C of the Buenos Aires Underground. The station is close to the San Martín Plaza, Kavanagh Building and the Plaza Hotel. The station was opened on 17 August 1937 when the extension of the line from Diagonal Norte to Retiro has already been in operation.

== Gallery ==
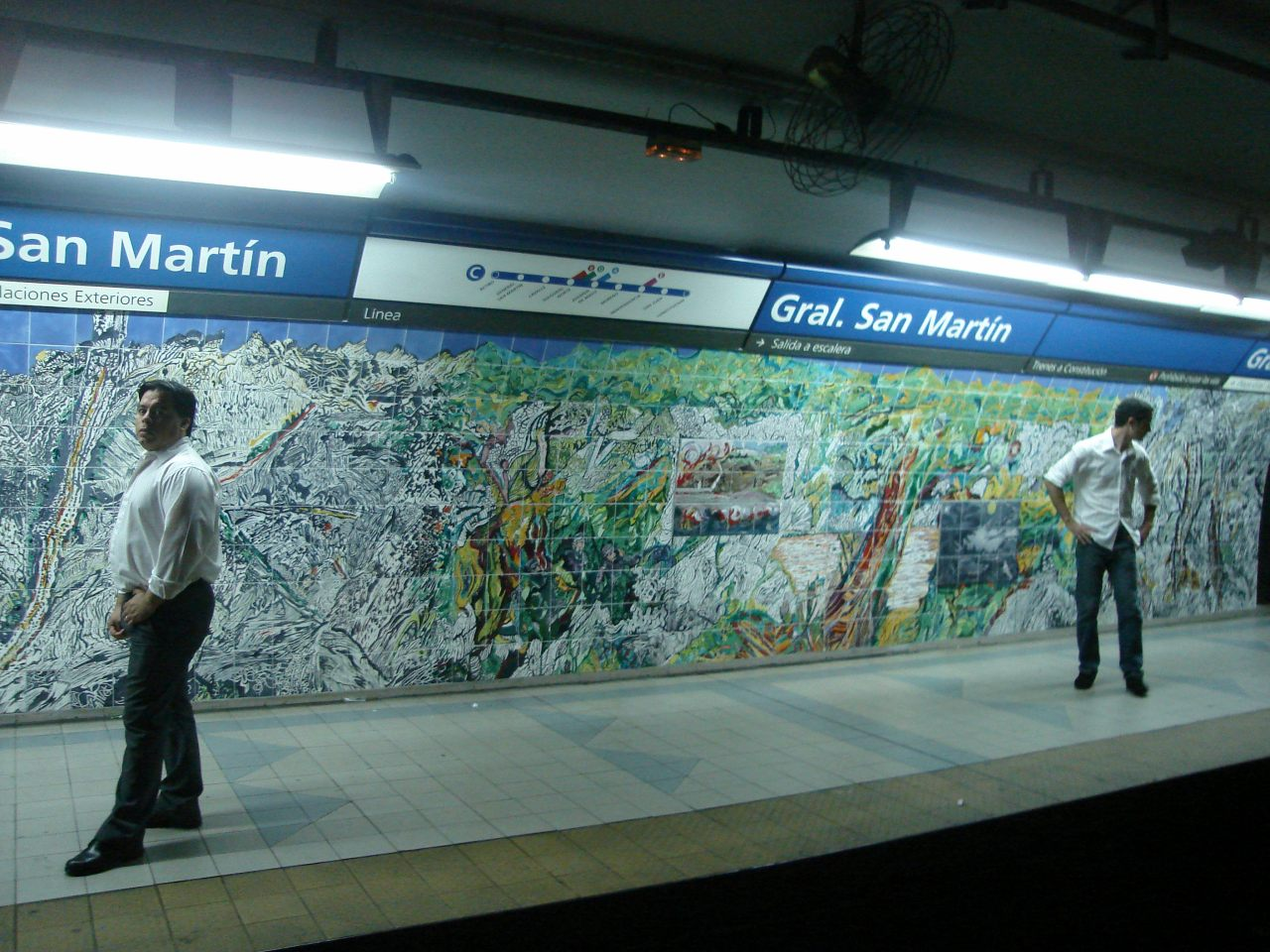

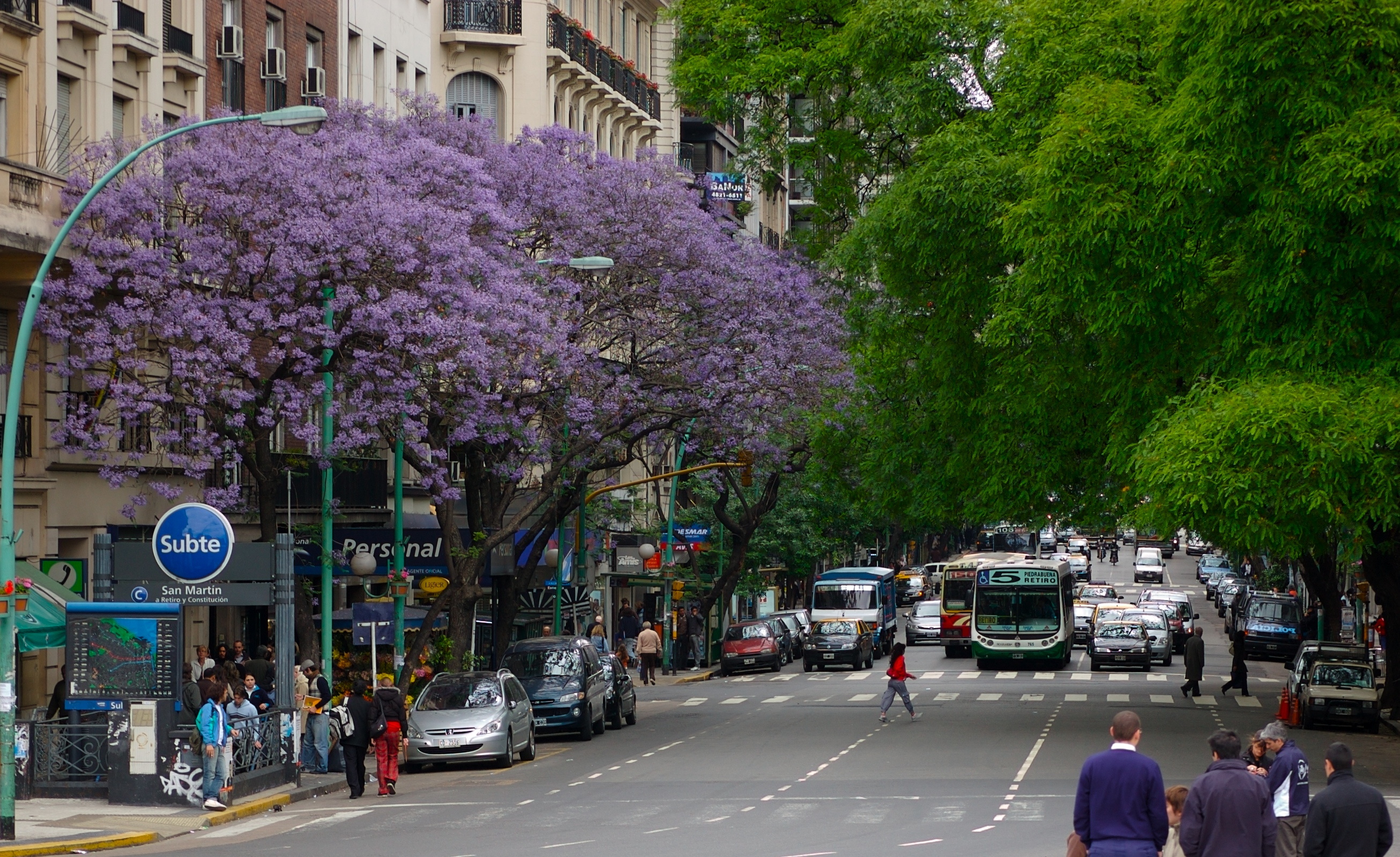

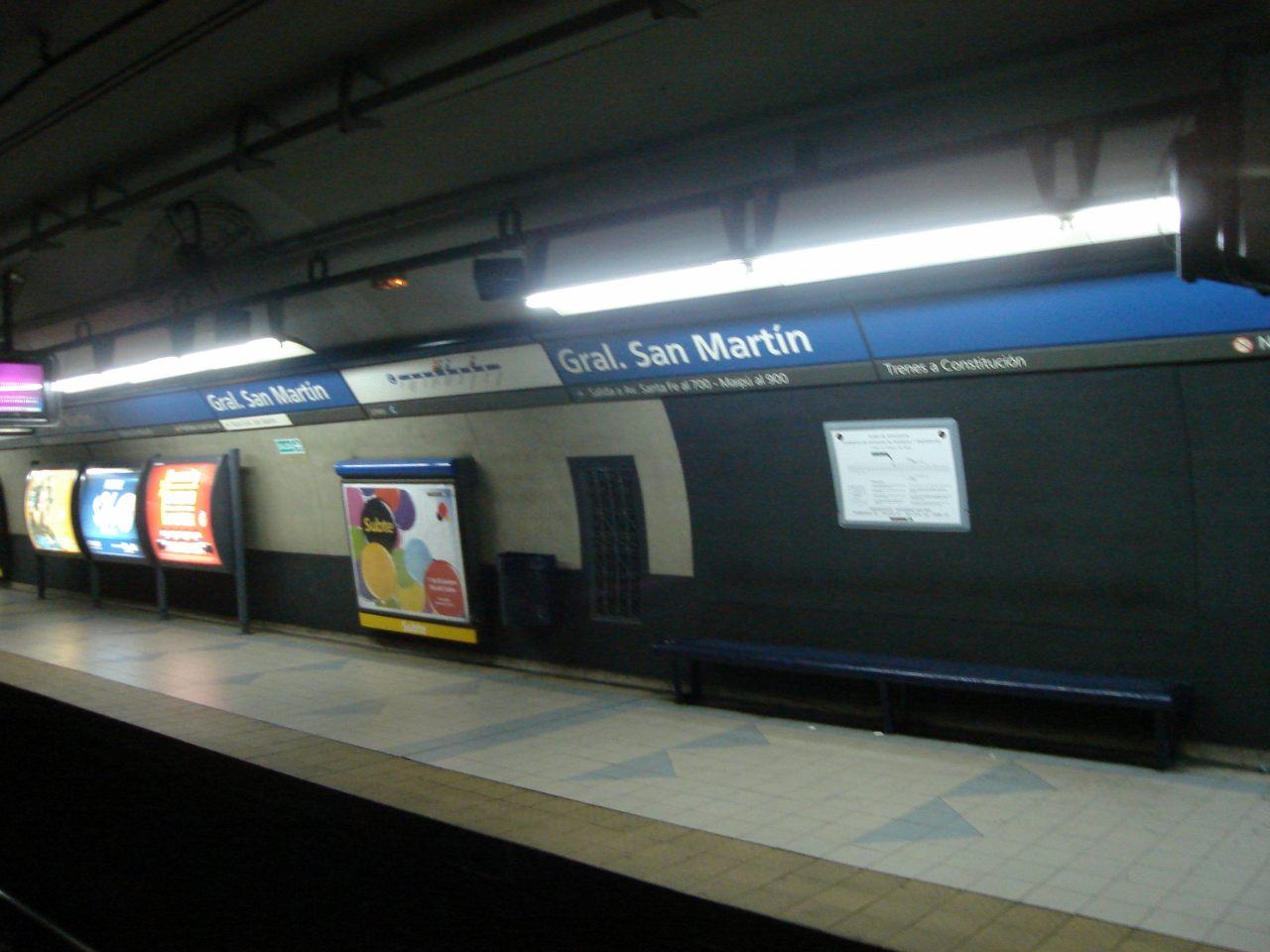

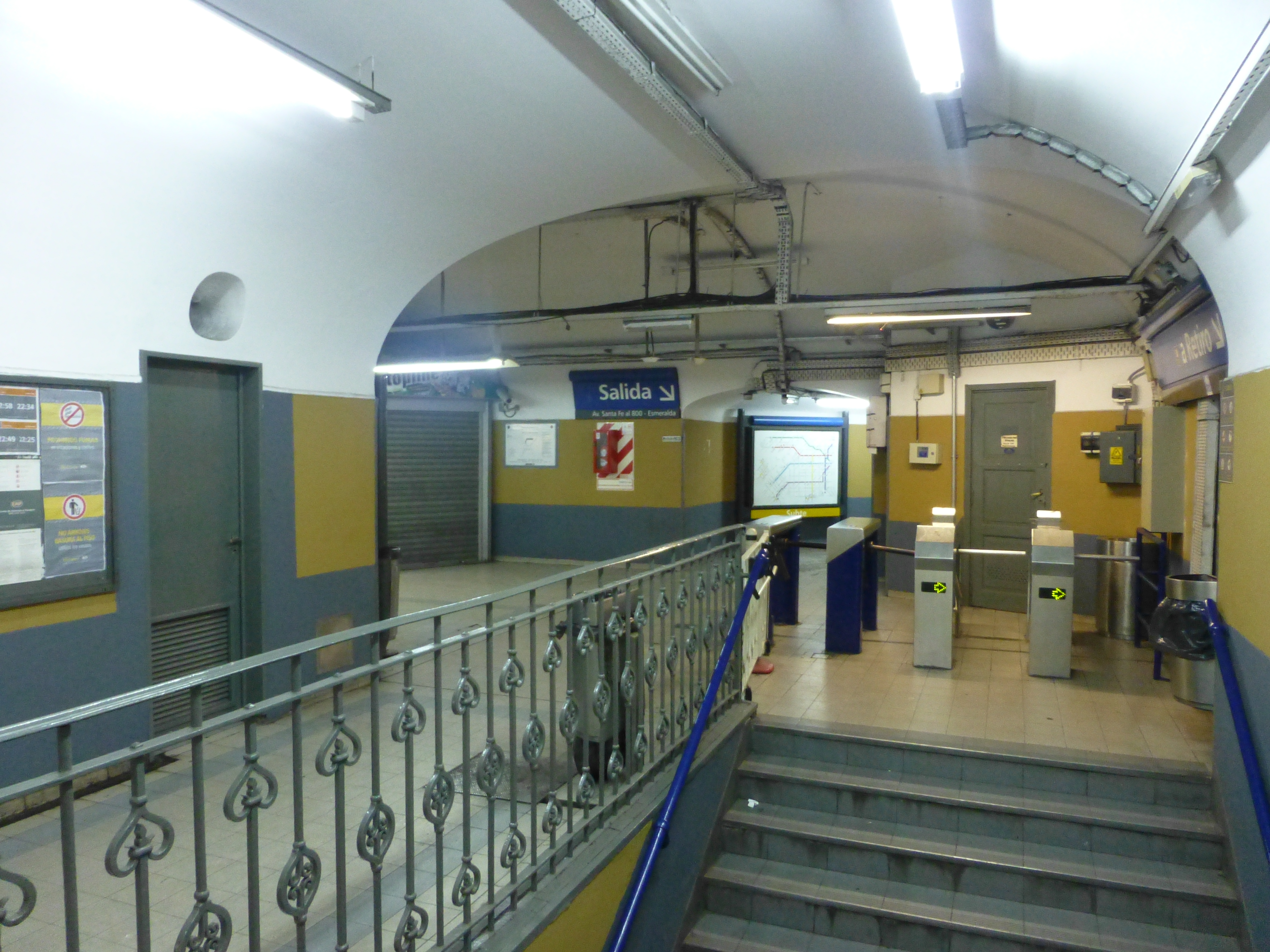
