= Lavalle (Buenos Aires Underground) =

Buenos Aires Underground station

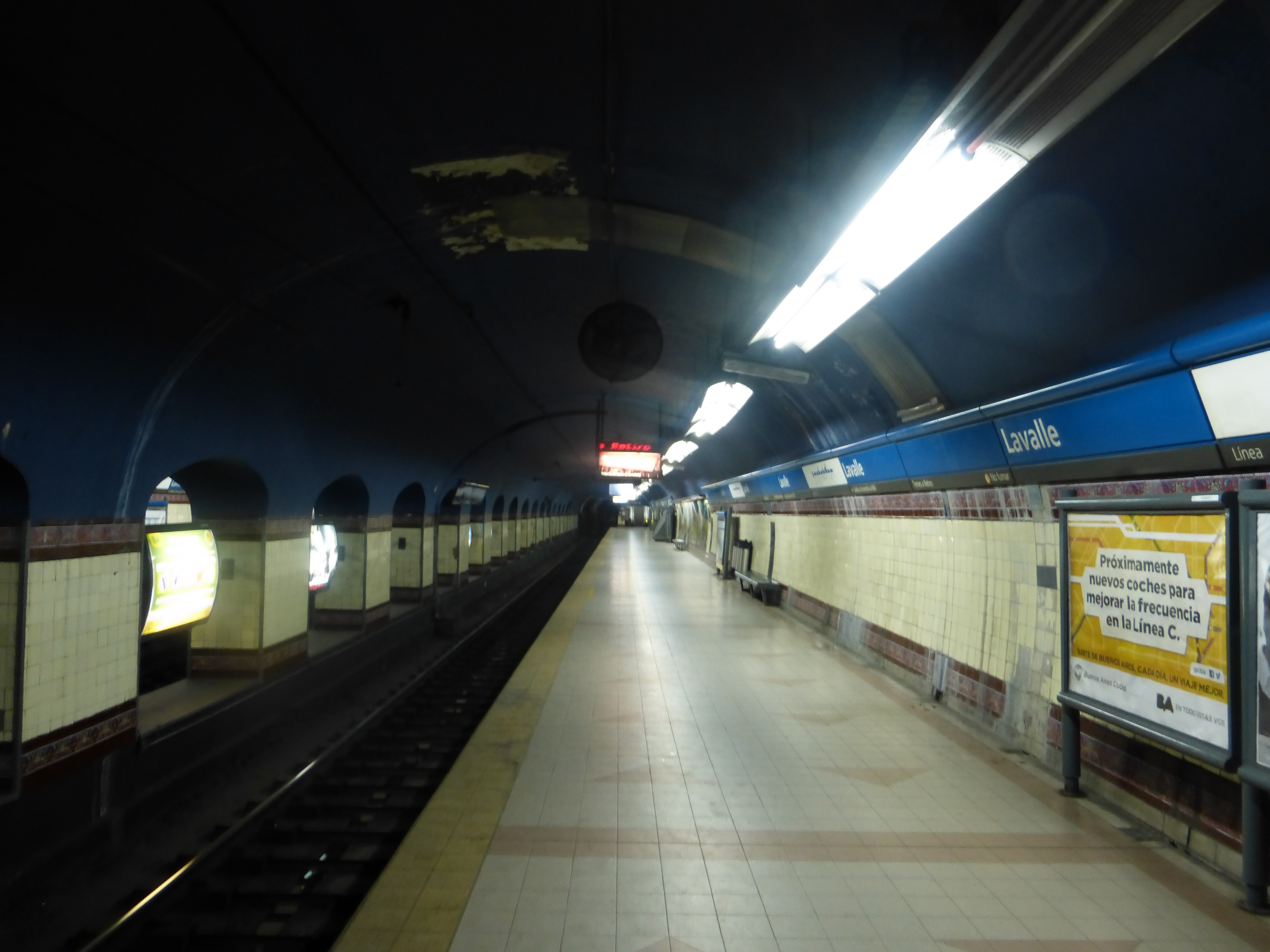

General information
- Location: Esmeralda and Lavalle
- Coordinates: 34°36′6.5″S 58°22′41.3″W
- Platforms: Side platforms

History
- Opened: 6 February 1936

Services
Preceding station	Buenos Aires Underground	Following station
General San Martín towards Retiro	Line C	Diagonal Norte towards Constitución
Location

Lavalle is a station on Line C of the Buenos Aires Underground. It is located near the Teatro Colón. The station was opened on 6 February 1936 as part of the extension of the line from Diagonal Norte to Retiro.

== Gallery ==
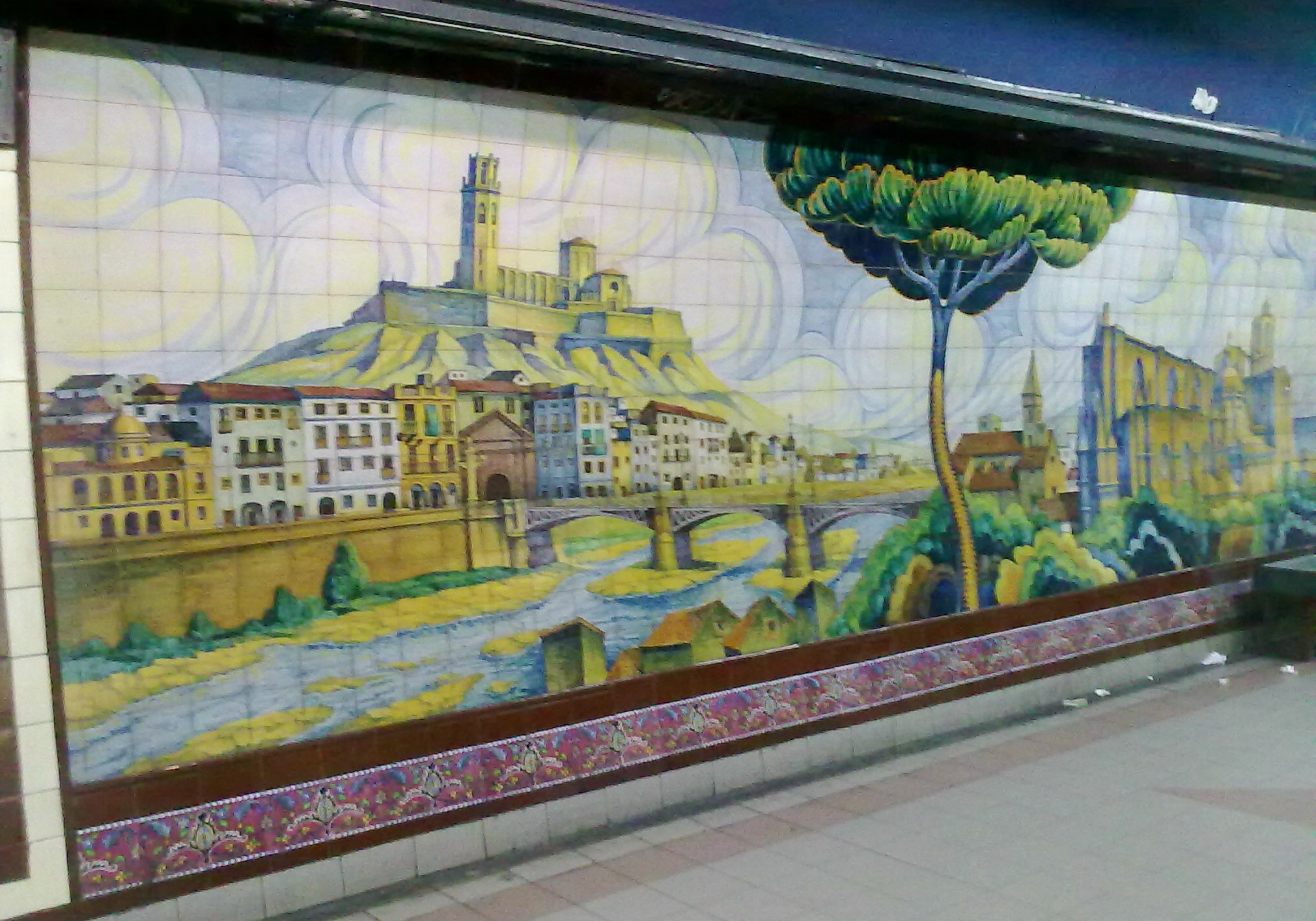

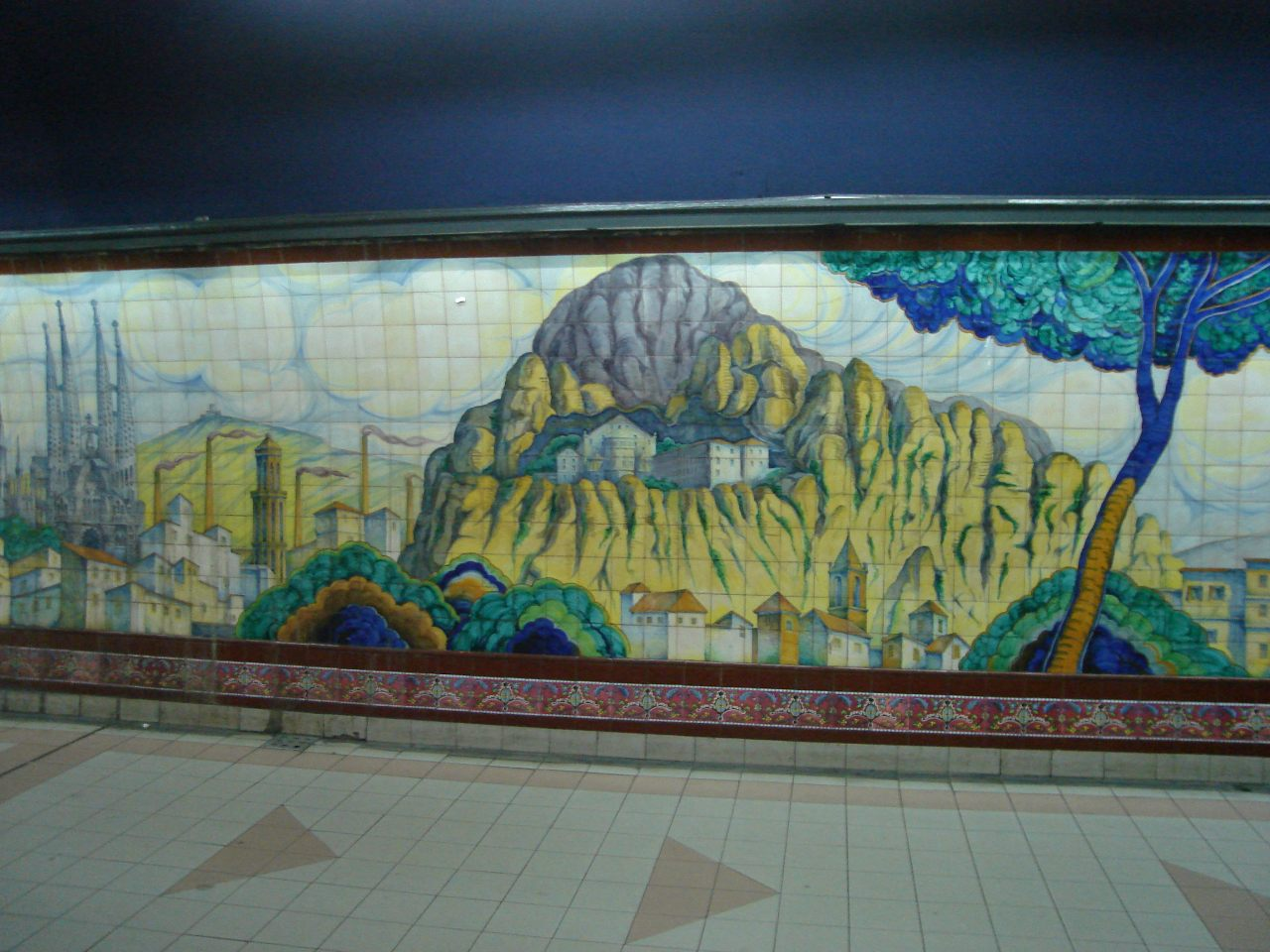

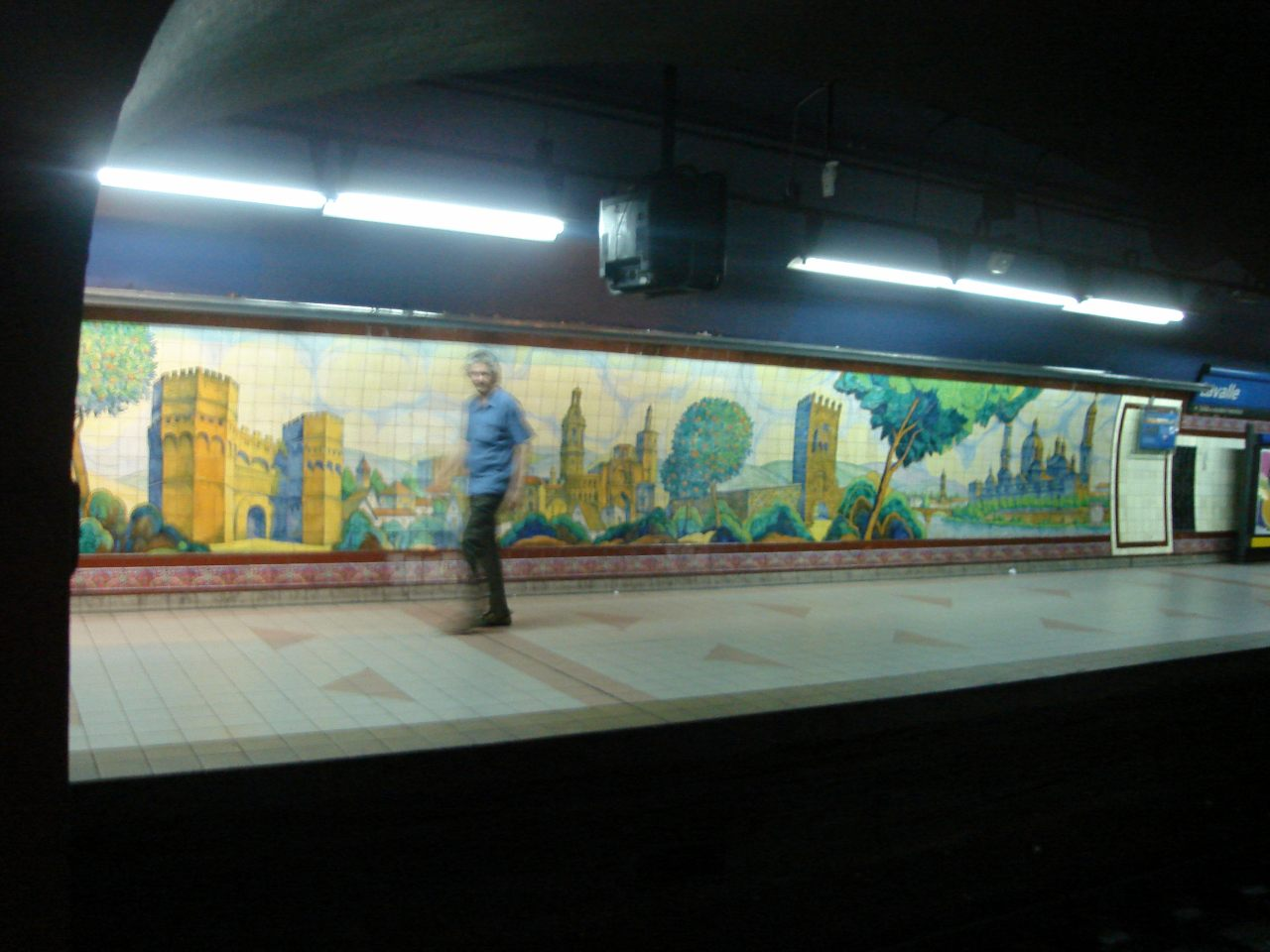
