= François Duval (politician) =

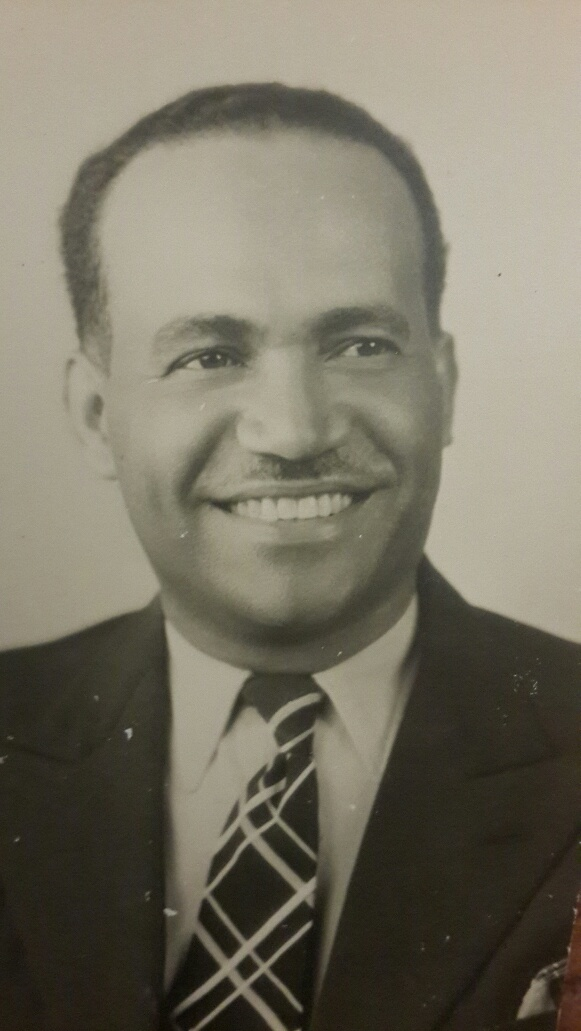

Senator of Martinique
- In office 1968–1977

François Duval (August 10, 1903, in Vauclin, Martinique – June 28, 1984, in Fort-de-France) was a politician from Martinique (France) who served in the French Senate from 1968 to 1977.
