= Salluste Duval =

Canadian physician (1852–1917)

Clarent-Salluste-Hermycle Duval (February 1852 – July 1917) was a Canadian doctor of medicine, inventor, engineer, organist, musician and professor of Mathematics & Mechanics at Université Laval and at the École Polytechnique de Montréal. Duval is primarily known for his improvements to the organ.

== Personal life ==
=== Family ===
Born in Saint-Jean-Port-Joli, Canada East, Duval was the son of Louis-Zepirin Duval, the Notary of the Seigneur in Saint-Jean-Port-Joli, and nephew to Eleonore Verreai, who was the daughter of another notary; Germain-Alexandre Verreau. Throughout Duval's early life he was inspired by his mother's career as an educator, finding himself interested in science, physics, mechanics, and music. Duval was claimed to be a tinkerer as a child and later became an inventor and engineer.

=== Death ===
In July 1917, Salluste Duval died in Montreal at his home on Wolfe Street. Duval was buried in Saint-Jean-Port-Joli, Quebec.
