= Ramón Lavalle =

Argentine diplomat and journalist

Ramon Lavalle
- Born: 1909; Buenos Aires, Argentina
- Died: 1968 (aged 58–59); Ypsilanti State Hospital, Ypsilanti, Michigan, U.S.
- Other names: Lavalle, Ramon B Muniz
- Occupation(s): Argentine diplomat and journalist

Ramon Lavalle (1909–1968), also known as Ramon Muniz Lavalle, was an Argentine diplomat and journalist who served as Argentine consul to Japan during World War II before renouncing his citizenship and going to the United States to work in U.S. intelligence operations for the Office of War Information.

Lavalle witnessed war crimes by Japanese soldiers and officers and provided testimony to World War II war crime trials. His grandfathers were Juan Lavalle, former Argentine General, Governor of Buenos Aires Province, and an Argentine folk-hero and Francisco Muniz, a prominent doctor in Buenos Aires. Both men are honoured in their country by being buried in the national La Recoleta Cemetery. Juan Lavalle is furthered honored with one of the most famous plazas in Buenos Aires, Plaza Lavalle and the largest pedestrian street, Calle Lavalle. The Teatro Colón Opera House, national post office, and Argentina's Supreme Court surround the Plaza. Muniz is honoured with Buenos Aires' major hospital being named Hospital Muniz.

Ramon Lavalle attended the London School of Economics. He married Amelia Mahou y Garcia in Spain in April 1936. The marriage produced three children; Gwendolyn Pasionaria, Arthur Jack Cimarron, and Raymond Muñiz. Gwendolyn, who was born in Glasgow, where Ramon Lavalle served at the Argentine Consulate, died in Kowloon of dysentery shortly after the Japanese invasion, which was reported by Carlos Baker in his Hemingway biography. The marriage ended in divorce in 1952. Ramon Lavalle later married Matilde Porras in Havana, Cuba.

Ramon Lavalle was fluent in thirteen languages.

He died in 1969 at Ypsilanti State Hospital, where he had been committed to by his then wife, Matilde. He died of pre-senility dementia, which his father and his sister, Perla, had also died from.
