= Lavalle Department, Corrientes =

Lavalle Department Departamento Lavalle (Spanish) Tetãvore Laválle (Guarani)
- Department
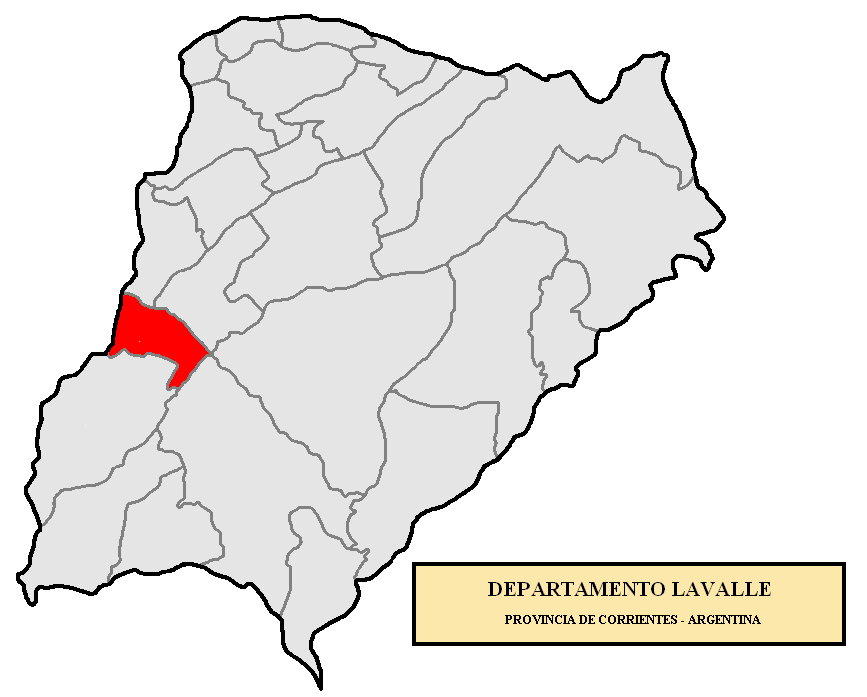
- location of Lavalle Department in Corrientes Province
- Coordinates: 29°01′S 59°10′W
- Country: Argentina
- Seat: Lavalle

Area
  - Total: 1,480 km^{2} (570 sq mi)

Population (2001 census [INDEC])
  - Total: 26,250
  - Density: 17.7/km^{2} (45.9/sq mi)
- Postal Code: W3443
- Area Code: 03777

Lavalle Department is a department of Corrientes Province in Argentina.

The provincial subdivision has a population of about 26,250 inhabitants in an area of 1,480 km^{2} (570 sq mi), and its capital city is Lavalle.

== Settlements ==
- Cruz de los Milagros
- Gobernador Juan E. Martínez
- Lavalle
- Santa Lucía
- Yataytí Calle
