= Amaury Duval (1760–1838) =

French lawyer, historian and diplomat (1760–1838)

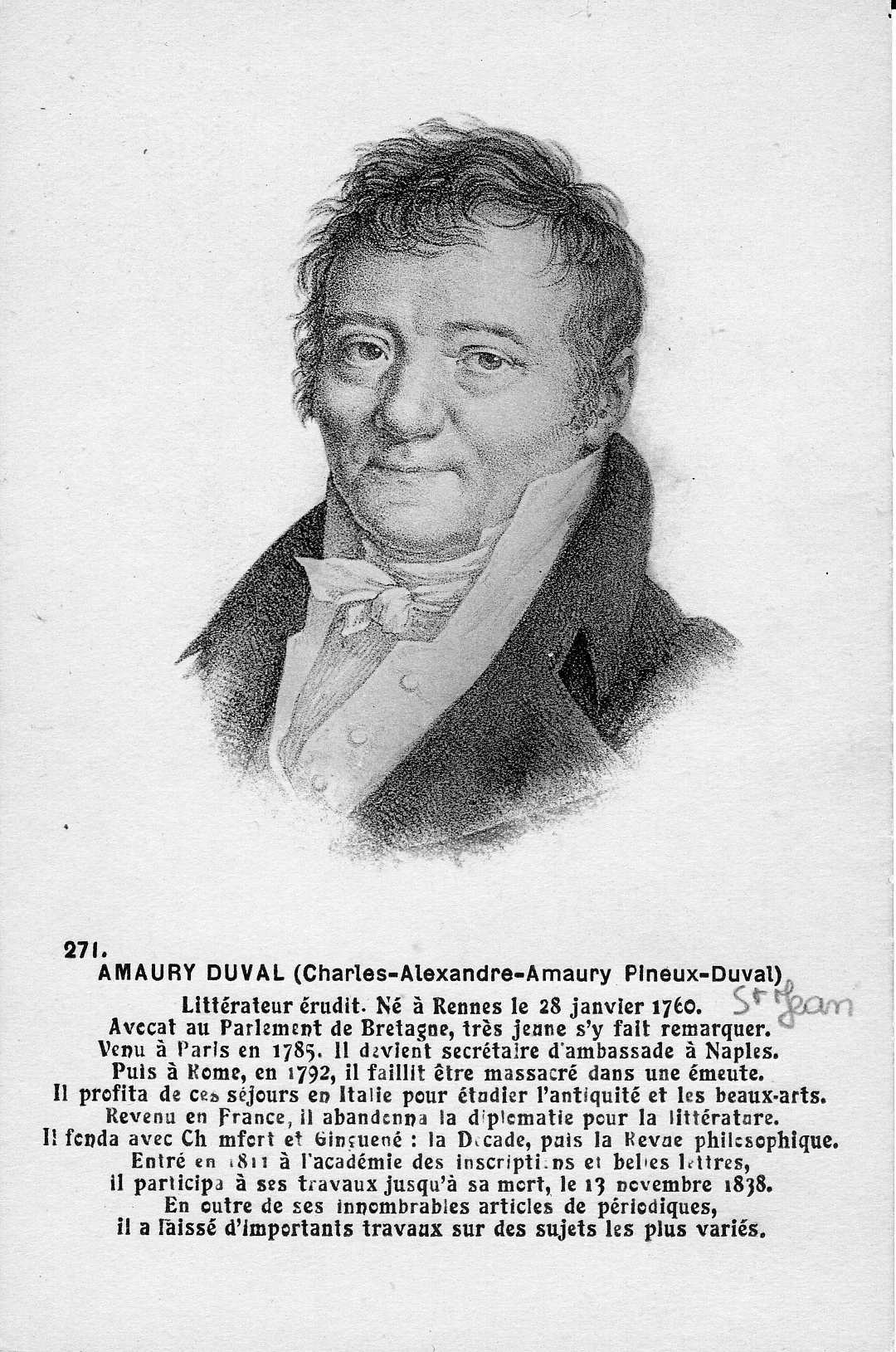
Amaury Duval

Charles-Alexandre-Amaury Pineux, known as Amaury Duval (28 January 1760 in Rennes – 12 November 1838 in Paris) was a French lawyer, historian, diplomat, writer and scholar. His brother was the playwright Alexandre Duval and one of his two sons was the painter Amaury Duval.

== Main works ==
- Paris et ses monuments, mesurés, dessinés et gravés par Baltard, architecte, avec des descriptions historiques par le citoyen Amaury-Duval (1803–05)
- Un songe d'Alexandre, fragment d'un poëme d'Arrien, retrouvé et publié par Amaury Duval (1810)
- Les Fontaines de Paris anciennes et nouvelles, ouvrage contenant 60 planches dessinées et gravées au trait, par M. Moisy, accompagnées de descriptions historiques et de notes critiques et littéraires, par M. Amaury Duval (1812)
- Mémoires historiques, politiques et littéraires sur le royaume de Naples par M. le comte Grégoire Orloff, publiés avec des notes et additions par Amaury Duval (5 volumes, 1819–31)
- Monuments des arts du dessin chez les peuples tant anciens que modernes, recueillis par le Baron Vivant Denon, pour servir à l'histoire des arts, lithographiés par ses soins et sous ses yeux, décrits et expliqués par Amaury Duval (4 volumes, 1829)
- L'Évêque Gozlin ou le Siège de Paris par les Normands. Chronique du IX siecle (2 volumes, 1832)
- Souvenirs (1829–1830) (1885). on Gallica
