= Lavalle, Santiago del Estero =

Coordinates: 28°12′S 65°06′W

Lavalle (Catamarca - Santiago del Estero)
- Municipality and village
- Interactive map of Lavalle (Catamarca - Santiago del Estero)
- Country: Argentina
- Province: Santiago del Estero
- Time zone: UTC−3 (ART)

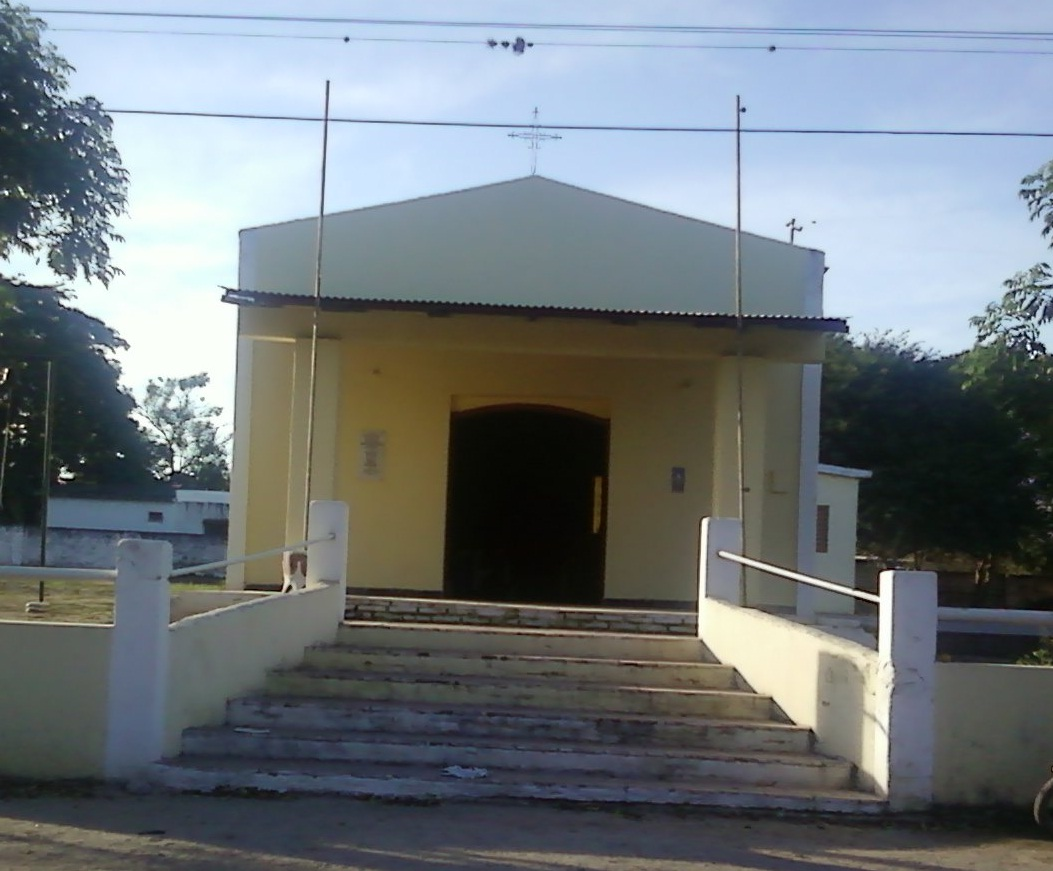
Lavalle, Santiago del Estero

Lavalle (Catamarca - Santiago del Estero) is a municipality and village in Santiago del Estero in Argentina.
