= La Vallee, U.S. Virgin Islands =

Coordinates: 17°47′01″N 64°48′08″W

La Vallee, United States Virgin Islands
- Village
- Interactive map of La Vallee, United States Virgin Islands
- Country: United States Virgin Islands
- Island: Saint Croix
- Time zone: UTC-4 (AST)

La Vallee is a settlement on the island of Saint Croix in the United States Virgin Islands.
