= Duval County =

Duval County may refer to:

- Duval County, Florida
- Duval County, Texas
