= Joseph Duval-Jouve =

French botanist

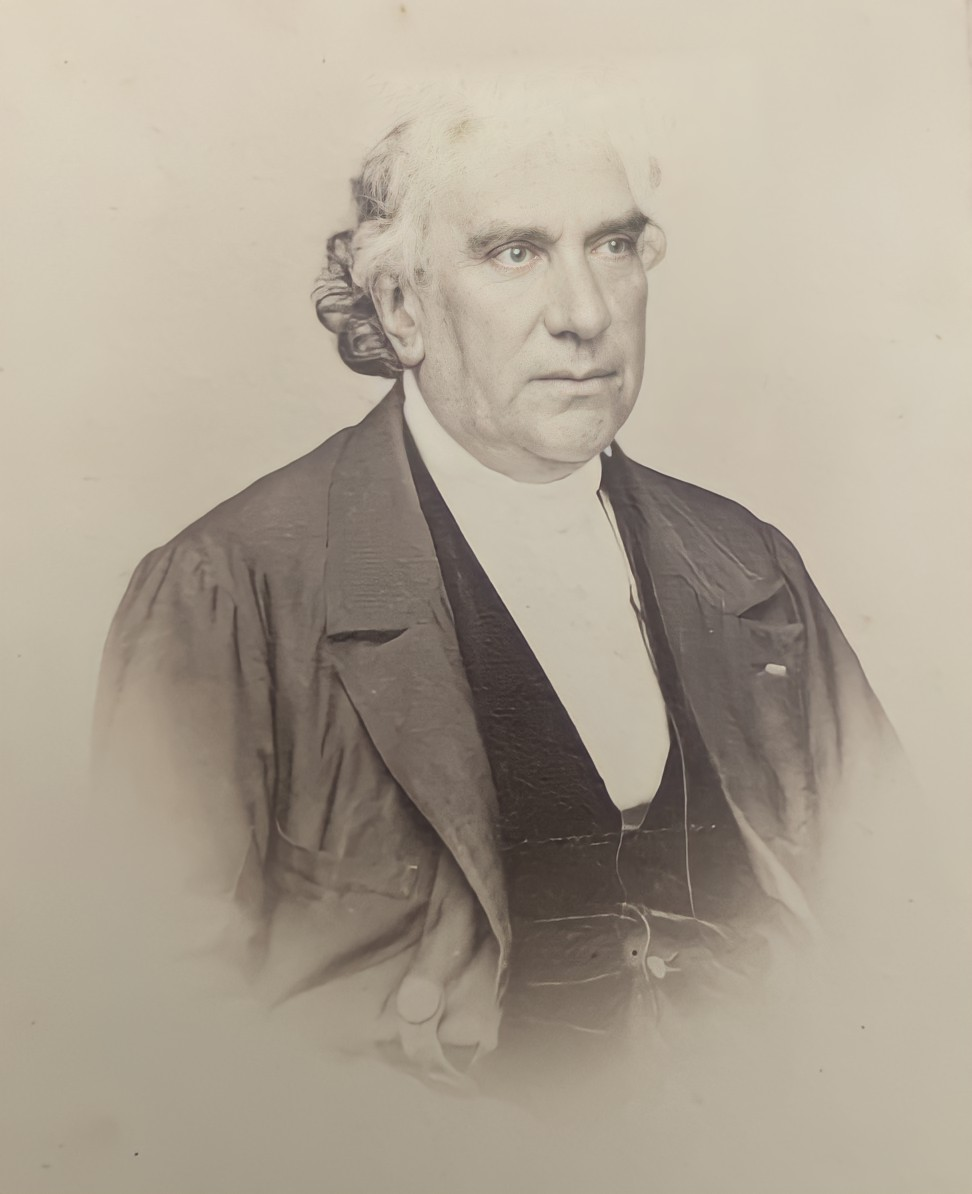
Joseph Duval-Jouve

Joseph Duval-Jouve (7 August 1810 – 25 August 1883) was a French botanist born in Boissy-Lamberville. He was the father of histologist Mathias-Marie Duval (1844-1907).

He taught classes at the college in Grasse (1832–52), afterwards serving as an academic inspector in Algiers, Strasbourg and Montpellier. A portion of his herbarium was donated to the faculty of sciences at Montpellier.

He specialized in research of the family Poaceae and the genus Equisetum. The plant genus Jouvea is named in his honor. He is the taxonomic authority for the grass genus Loretia.

== Written works ==
- Histoire naturelle des Equisetum de France (1864)
- Étude anatomique de l'arète des graminées (1870)
