= Michael Raoul Duval =

American lawyer

Michael Raoul-Duval
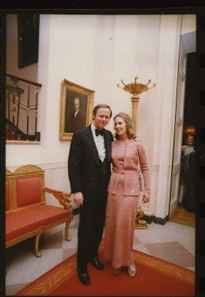
- Duval (left) in 1975

Personal details
- Born: July 18, 1936 San Francisco, California
- Died: April 20, 2001 (aged 64) Santa Fe, New Mexico
- Spouse: Janice Mahan Duval
- Children: Jack
- Education: Georgetown University; University of California, Hastings College of the Law

Military service
- Allegiance: United States
- Branch/service: United States Marine Corps
- Unit: United States Marine Corps Reserves

Michael Raoul-Duval (July 18, 1936 – April 20, 2001) was an investment banker and lawyer in the United States who had Senior White House positions while serving under Presidents Richard Nixon and Gerald Ford, where he rose to the position of Special Counsel to the President.

== Education ==
Michael Duval was a tennis player and graduated from Georgetown University in 1961 and received his law degree at Hastings College of the Law in San Francisco in 1967.

== White House work ==
Duval became staff assistant to President Nixon in 1970, planning and scheduling foreign trips, after being a lawyer at the Federal Aviation Administration. He rose to Domestic Council Director for Energy and Transportation.

Under President Ford, Duval continued his work as Domestic Council Director and had frequent access to Ford, often sitting in on meetings between the President and members of Congress, cabinet officers, or representatives of business, industry, and labor. He later became executive director of the Intelligence Coordinating Group, to investigate alleged intelligence community abuses of authority. They prepared a set of recommendations on intelligence community reform and drafted an Executive Order to implement President Ford's decisions.

After the ICG completed its work in early 1976, Duval began working closely with then vice-president Dick Cheney, to focus on Ronald Reagan's spring primary elections. In June, Cheney urged Raoul‑Duval and others to draft a "rose garden" strategy for the fall election campaign. In July he revised and expanded this strategy memo into an overall strategy plan for the fall campaign that Ford later approved. Duval's last role in Ford's White House was special counsel to President Ford.

== After the White House ==
Duval later joined the Mead Corporation in Dayton, Ohio, in 1977 to become senior vice president. In 1984, he moved to the First Boston Corporation in New York where he became a member of its management committee. He formed the Duval Group in 1990, a New York investment banking firm specializing in international mergers.

He later moved to Santa Fe where he opened the investment banking firm Michael Duval & Associates where he was chairman until he retired in 1999. He also became involved as a student and board member of Dr. Courtney Brown's Farsight Institute , exploring the science of remote viewing, the formerly classified Central Intelligence Agency and DIA program established in the early 1970s through Stanford Research Institute.

He died from multiple sclerosis on April 20, 2001.
