= Pierre Duval =

Pierre Duval is the name of:

- Pierre Duval (geographer) (1618–1683), French geographer
- Pierre Duval (singer) (1932–2004), French-Canadian operatic tenor
- Pierre Duval, a pseudonym used by Remy Chauvin (1913–2009), French entomologist and parapsychological writer
- Pierre Duval Le Camus (1790–1854), a French painter and lithographer
