= Santa Lucía, Corrientes =

Santa Lucía
- City
- Coat of arms

- Location of Santa Lucía in Argentina
- Coordinates: 28°59′S 59°6′W
- Country: Argentina
- Province: Corrientes
- Department: Lavalle
- Elevation: 35 m (115 ft)

Population (2010 census)
  - Total: 11,589
- Time zone: UTC−3 (ART)
- CPA base: W3440
- Dialing code: +54 3777

Santa Lucía is a city in the province of Corrientes, Argentina. It has 11,589 inhabitants as per the 2010 census [INDEC]. It lies on the western shore of the Santa Lucía River, between this river and the nearby Paraná, about 20 km northeast from the city of Goya and 170 km south from the provincial capital Corrientes.

The city hosts a National Horticulture Festival every year during the first half of November.

== Indigenous languages ==
The following language names are reported by Čestmír Loukotka (1968) as extinct unclassified languages of the Santa Lucía Mission.

- Casota language
- Culaycha language
- Emischata language
- Supeselb language
- Taguaylen language
