= Deval Khedi =

- village
- Location within Madhya Pradesh Location within India
- Coordinates: 23.3320076°N 77.4164063°E
- Country: India
- State: Madhya Pradesh
- District: Bhopal
- Tehsil: Huzur
- Elevation: 485 m (1,591 ft)

Population (2011)
  - Total: 698
- Time zone: UTC+5:30 (IST)
- ISO 3166 code: MP-IN
- 2011 census code: 482456

Deval Khedi is a village in the Bhopal district of Madhya Pradesh, India. It is located in the Huzur tehsil and the Phanda block.

== Demographics ==
According to the 2011 census of India, Deval Khedi has 136 households. The effective literacy rate (i.e. the literacy rate of population excluding children aged 6 and below) is 68.85%.

Demographics (2011 Census)
	Total	Male	Female
Population	698	360	338
Children aged below 6 years	117	57	60
Scheduled caste	131	68	63
Scheduled tribe	0	0	0
Literates	400	241	159
Workers (all)	361	183	178
Main workers (total)	264	139	125
Main workers: Cultivators	204	102	102
Main workers: Agricultural labourers	47	25	22
Main workers: Household industry workers	0	0	0
Main workers: Other	13	12	1
Marginal workers (total)	97	44	53
Marginal workers: Cultivators	7	4	3
Marginal workers: Agricultural labourers	89	40	49
Marginal workers: Household industry workers	1	0	1
Marginal workers: Others	0	0	0
Non-workers	337	177	160
