= Duvall (surname) =

Duvall (also DuVall) is a French surname and an alternative spelling of "Duval", which literally translates from French to English as "of the valley". It derives from the Norman "Devall", which has both English and French ties. Variant spellings include: Davolls, Deavall, DeVile, Devill, Deville, Divall, Divell and Evill. Its meaning is derived from the French town of Déville, Seine-Inferieure. The spelling, "Devall", was first recorded in England in the Domesday Book.

In France, variant spellings include: Lavalle, Lavallie, Laval, Lavall, Deval, Lavell, Lavelle and Lavielle. The Duvall surname has also been spelled some other ways including DeVall, Devoll, DeVol, DeValle and Devaulle.

Notable people with the surname include:

- Adam Duvall, American baseball player
- Betty Duvall, American spy
- Carol Duvall, television show host
- Clea DuVall, American actress
- Gabriel Duvall, American jurist
- Hadley Duvall, American reproductive freedom advocate
- Len Duvall, British politician
- Mareen Duvall, French Huguenot and early American settler
- Mat DuVall, American bodybuilder and wrestler
- Michael D. Duvall, American politician
- Mike Duvall, American baseball player
- Robert Duvall, American actor
- Robert E. Duvall, American politician
- Robert Duvall (politician), American politician from Kentucky
- Shelley Duvall, American actress
- Thomas L. Duvall Jr., scientist – Mount Duvall was named after him
- William DuVall, American musician

== Fictional characters ==
- Marcus Duvall, character in a 2005 American-French action thriller film

== See also ==
- Deval (disambiguation)
- Devall (surname)
- Duval (surname)
- Duvall (disambiguation)
