= John Crittenden Duval =

American writer

John Crittenden Duval (1816–1897) was an American writer of Texas literature. He has been noted as being the first Texas man of letters and was dubbed the "Father of Texas Literature" by J. Frank Dobie. His Early Times in Texas was initially published serially in 1867 in Burke's Weekly (Macon, Georgia) and was finally published in book form in 1892. The story, which became a Texas classic, recounted Duval's escape from the Goliad Massacre, in which his brother, Burr H. Duval, was killed, as well as other tales.

Another brother, Thomas Howard DuVal, was a distinguished Texas judge. Their father, William Pope Duval, was the Territorial Governor of Florida from 1822 to 1834.
