= Thomas Howard DuVal =

American judge

Judge of the United States District Court for the Western District of Texas
- In office March 3, 1857 – October 10, 1880
- Appointed by: Franklin Pierce
- Preceded by: Seat established by 11 Stat. 164
- Succeeded by: Ezekiel B. Turner

Personal details
- Born: Thomas Howard DuVal; November 4, 1813 Buckingham County, Virginia
- Died: October 10, 1880 (aged 66) Fort Omaha, Nebraska
- Children: Florence Duval West
- Parent: William Pope Duval (father)
- Relatives: Burr H. Duval; John Crittenden Duval
- Education: St. Joseph's College read law

Thomas Howard DuVal (November 4, 1813 – October 10, 1880) was a United States district judge of the United States District Court for the Western District of Texas.

== Education and career ==
Born November 4, 1813, in Buckingham County, Virginia, DuVal graduated from St. Joseph's College in Bardstown, Kentucky in 1833, and read law in 1837. He entered private practice in Tallahassee, Florida from 1837 to 1841. He was clerk of the Court of Appeals for the Florida Territory from 1841 to 1843. He was Secretary for the Florida Territory (State of Florida from March 3, 1845) from 1843 to 1846. He was Reporter for the Supreme Court of Texas in 1846. He resumed private practice in Austin, Texas from 1846 to 1855. He was Secretary of State of Texas starting in 1851. He was a Judge of the Texas District Court for the Second Judicial District from 1855 to 1856.

== Federal judicial service ==
DuVal was nominated by President Franklin Pierce on February 26, 1857, to the United States District Court for the District of Texas, to a new seat authorized by 11 Stat. 164. He was confirmed by the United States Senate on March 3, 1857, and received his commission the same day. His service terminated on October 10, 1880, due to his death in Fort Omaha, Nebraska.

=== Civil War ===
Due to the American Civil War and Texas's secession from the Union, DuVal was unable to hold court from 1861 to 1865. However, he remained at his station in Austin, taking a job with the General Land Office to sustain himself, due to the fact that his judicial salary was unavailable due to the war and another unpaid position as a deputy county surveyor, which permitted him to avoid conscription into the Confederate States Army. He was sufficiently respected by the local community that he did not suffer indignities under the Confederate government. DuVal ultimately was able to resume holding court at the end of the war and was paid his full back pay due him during the war years.

== See also ==
- William Pope Duval, his father
- Burr H. Duval, his eldest brother, who perished in the Goliad massacre
- John Crittenden Duval, another brother
- Florence Duval West, his daughter

== Sources ==
Legal offices
Preceded by Seat established by 11 Stat. 164	Judge of the United States District Court for the Western District of Texas; 1857–1880	Succeeded by Ezekiel B. Turner
