= William Pope Duval =

American politician

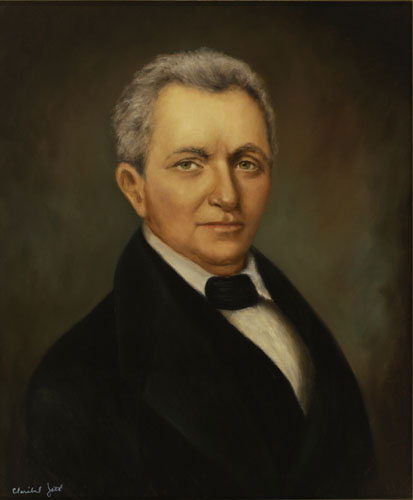

1st Territorial Governor of Florida
- In office April 17, 1822 – April 24, 1834
- President: James Monroe; John Quincy Adams; Andrew Jackson
- Preceded by: Andrew Jackson (as Military Governor)
- Succeeded by: John Eaton

Member of the U.S. House of Representatives from Kentucky's 10th district
- In office March 4, 1813 – March 3, 1815
- Preceded by: Mount Comfort
- Succeeded by: Benjamin Hardin

Personal details
- Born: September 4, 1784 (near present-day Richmond, Virginia)
- Died: March 19, 1854 (aged 69) Washington, D.C.
- Party: Democratic-Republican (1813–1828); Democratic (1828–1834; 1844–1848); Whig (1834–1844)
- Spouse: Nancy Hynes Duval

William Pope Duval (September 4, 1784 – March 19, 1854) was the first civilian governor of the Florida Territory, succeeding Andrew Jackson, who had been a military governor. In his twelve-year governorship, from 1822 to 1834, he divided Florida into four territories, established the local court system, and chose Tallahassee as the territory's capital because of its central location. Duval County, where Jacksonville is located, Duval Street in Key West, and Duval Street in Tallahassee are named for him.

== Early life ==
William Duval was born to Major William Duval and Ann Pope in "Mansfield," Henrico County, Virginia (near present-day Richmond). At the age of 14, he left home and struck out on his own, settling in Bardstown, Kentucky. He began to study law and was admitted to the bar at age 19, in 1804. On October 3, 1804 (then 20), he married Nancy Hynes, daughter of Colonel Andrew Hynes, in Bardstown. Through his grandmother, Ann Lucy Smith Fox, William Duval was a descendant of Catherine Carey.

== Congressional service ==
During an outbreak of Native American hostilities in 1812, Duval was given command of a company of mounted volunteers. This service and his law experience helped to win him election to the 13th Congress of the United States in 1812. He served as a representative from the Democratic-Republican Party in the new 10th Congressional District of Kentucky until 1815, when he did not seek re-election. He returned to Kentucky and continued to practice law.

== Territory of Florida ==
In 1821, Florida became a U.S. territory. Duval was named U.S. Judge for the East Florida district on May 18, 1821. On April 17, 1822, President James Monroe appointed him as the first non-military governor of the territory, succeeding Gen. Andrew Jackson. In addition, Most Worshipful William Pope Duval was elected the first Grand Master of the Grand Lodge of Florida, Free and Accepted Masons in 1830.

He was reappointed by presidents John Quincy Adams and Andrew Jackson. During his twelve-year administration, he selected the small Indian village of Tallahassee as the site for the territory's capital, on account of its (north) central location. He was also known for his peaceful dealings with the Native Americans. He signed the first act of legislation in the Territory of Florida, dividing it into four sections and establishing the local court system.

== Post-governorship ==
Duval continued to live in Florida for a number of years, practicing law. His former mansion burned in 1905, and the site now houses the Carnegie Library at FAMU. He moved to Texas in 1848. He and his wife had eight children, many of whom began families in Texas.

All three of his sons were distinguished Texans: Burr Harrison Duval, Thomas Howard DuVal, and John Crittenden Duval. Thomas' daughter, Florence Duval West, was a poet.

William Pope Duval died in Washington, D.C.; his remains were interred at the Congressional Cemetery.

== Legacy ==
- Duval County, Florida, was named for him.
- Duval County, Texas, was named for his son, Captain Burr H. Duval.
- The World War II Liberty Ship SS William P. Duval was named in his honor.

There are many roads in Florida named after him, the most well-known being Duval Street in Key West, Florida.

Washington Irving's character "Ralph Ringwood” and James K. Paulding's character "Nimrod Wildfire" were based on Duval.

U.S. House of Representatives
Preceded by District created	Member of the U.S. House of Representatives from Kentucky's 10th congressional district 1813–1815	Succeeded by Benjamin Hardin
Political offices
Preceded by Andrew Jackson as Military Governor of Florida	Territorial Governor of Florida; 1822–1834	Succeeded by John Eaton
