= Alexandre-Vincent Pineux Duval =

French dramatist and theater manager (1767–1842)

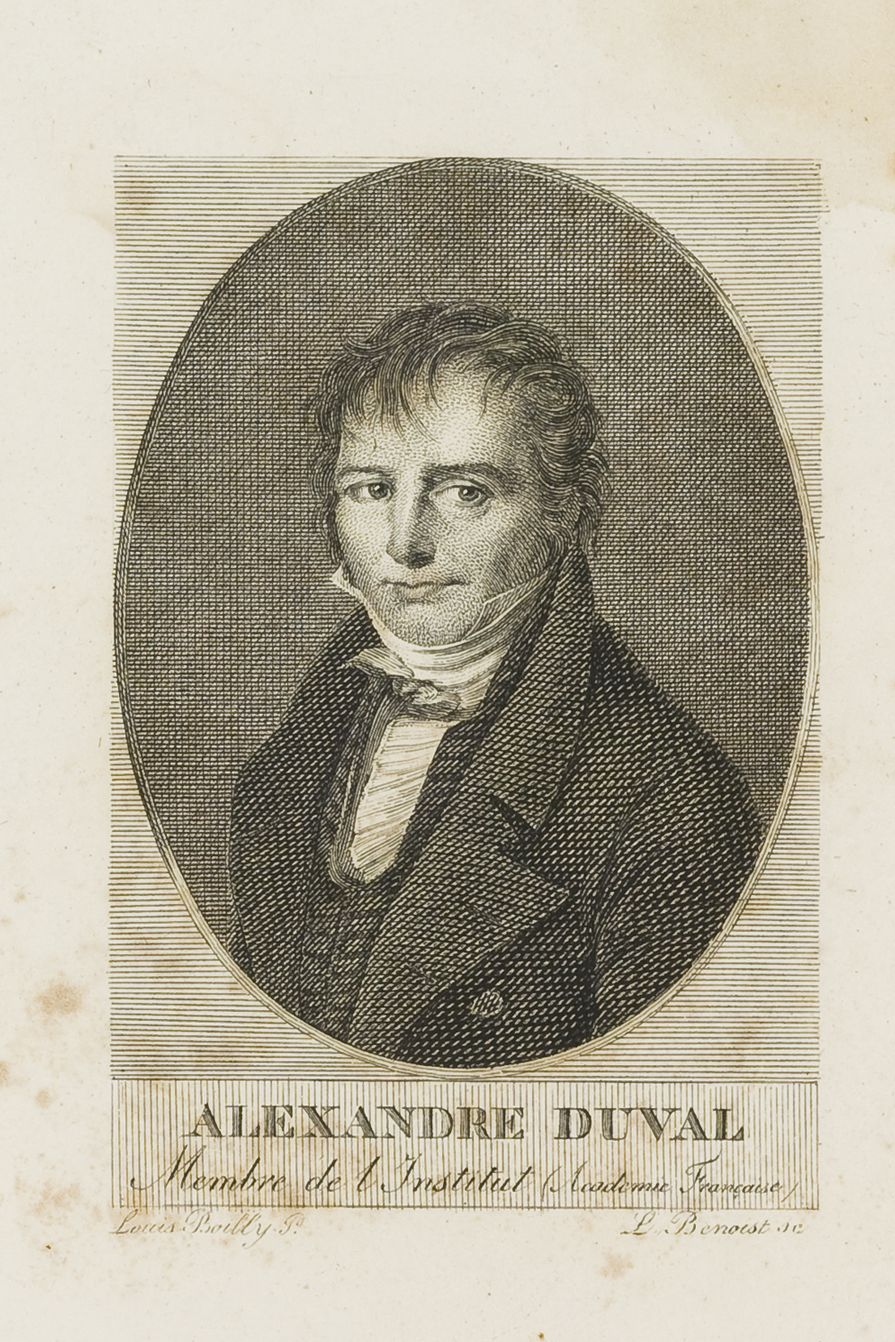
Alexandre Duval

Alexandre-Vincent Pineux Duval (6 April 1767, in Rennes – 1 September 1842, in Paris) was a French dramatist, sailor, architect, actor, theatre manager. He was the eighth member elected to occupy seat 4 of the Académie française in 1812.

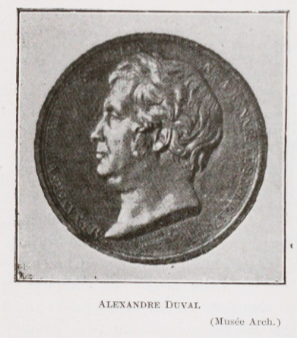
Alexandre-Vincent Pineux

Duval was brother to the diplomat Amaury Duval (1760–1838).

== Bibliography ==
- Les Projets de mariage (1790)
- Les Tuteurs vengés (1794)
- La Manie d'être quelque chose (1795)
- Le Défenseur officieux (1795)
- La Jeunesse de Richelieu (1796)
- Les Héritiers ou le Naufrage, comédie en 1 acte et en prose (représentée pour la première fois le 27 novembre 1796)
- Maison à vendre (1800);
- Édouard en Écosse (1801), en 3 actes et en prose
- Guillaume le Conquérant (1803)
- Shakespeare amoureux (1804)
- Le Menuisier de Livonie (1805)
- Le Tyran domestique, en 5 actes et en vers (1805)
- La Jeunesse d'Henri V, en 3 actes (1806)
- Le faux Stanislas (1809)
- Le Chevalier d'industrie en 5 actes et en vers (1809)
- Le Retour d'un croisé, parodie des mélodrames alors en vogue (1810)
- La Manie des grandeurs, en 5 actes et en vers (1817)
- La manie des grandeurs (1817)
- Le Faux Bonhomme (1821)
- La Fille d'honneur, en 5 actes et en vers (1819)

== Libretti ==
- Le Prisonnier, musique de Domenico Della-Maria, créé le 10 pluviôse an VI, Opéra-Comique (salle Favart);
- Le Vieux Château, musique de Domenico Della-Maria, créé le 25 ventôse an VI, théâtre Feydeau;
- L'Oncle valet, musique de Domenico Della-Maria, créé le 18 frimaire an VII, Opéra-Comique (salle Favart);
- Le Trente et Quarante, ou le Portrait, musique d'Angelo Tarchi, créé le 17 floréal an VI, Opéra-Comique (salle Favart);
- La Maison du Marais ou Trois ans d'absence, musique de Domenico Della-Maria, créé le 17 brumaire an VIII, Opéra-Comique (salle Favart);
- Maison à vendre, musique de Nicolas Dalayrac, créé le 1er brumaire an IX, Opéra-Comique (salle Favart);
- Joseph, opéra biblique en trois actes, musique d'Étienne-Nicolas Méhul, créé le 17 février 1807, Opéra-Comique (théâtre Feydeau).

He also published a collection of his works in nine volumes (1812–1825).

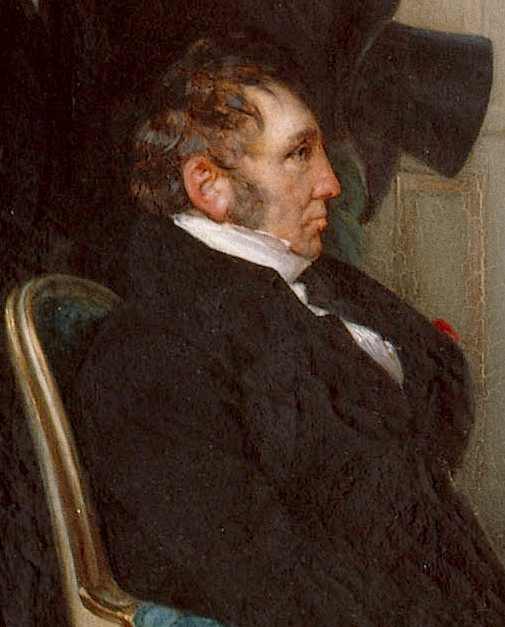
Alexandre Duval, depicted in the painting Andrieux Giving a Reading in the Foyer at the Comédie-Française in 1828, by François-Joseph Heim, 1847
