= Burr H. Duval =

American rifleman (1809–1836)

Burr Harrison Duval (1809 – March 27, 1836) was the commander of the Kentucky Mustangs, First Regiment Volunteers, a group of Kentucky long-riflemen formed in Bardstown, Kentucky, in November 1835 during the Texas Revolution. He and hundreds of others surrendered to the Mexican army at Goliad, Texas, only to be executed in the Goliad Massacre.

== Early life and family ==
Burr H. Duval was the son of William Pope Duval and Nancy Hynes. He was born in 1809 in Bardstown. William Pope Duval was the first and longest-serving (twelve years) Territorial Governor of Florida. Burr Duval's brother, John Crittenden Duval (1816–1897), who later became a writer, was captured with him at Goliad; however, his life was spared. Another brother, Thomas Howard DuVal (1813–1880), had a distinguished judicial career in Texas.

He attended St. Joseph's College in Bardstown.

== Texas Revolution ==
After forming the Kentucky Mustangs, the group traveled to Texas to fight for independence from Mexico. They arrived at Quintana, Texas, in December 1835. Duval and his company were put under the command of Colonel James Walker Fannin, with Duval given the rank of captain.

The Mustangs, along with the five other companies under Fannin's command, were in Goliad, Texas, on March 14, 1836, when they received orders from Commander-in-Chief of the Texas Army Sam Houston to retreat to Victoria, Texas. Fannin delayed the retreat from Presidio La Bahia in Goliad, waiting for reinforcements.

Once it was learned that the reinforcements had been defeated on their way to Goliad, Colonel Fannin ordered the retreat. Captain Duval and his men began to retreat with the regiment, however, by the time the order came, the Mexican army under the command of José de Urrea had completely surrounded the town of Goliad. Duval and all of the men under Fannin's command were forced to surrender to the Mexican army on March 19, 1836.

A week following the surrender, Antonio López de Santa Anna ordered the execution of most of the captured men. Colonel Fannin, Burr Duval and almost 400 other men were executed on March 27 in what became known as the Goliad Massacre.

== Honors ==
Duval County, Texas, is named after him.
