= Richard Frenkel =

Richard "Rick" G. Frenkel (born 1966 or 1967) was an in-house intellectual property counsel and director of intellectual property at Cisco Systems. He was once the anonymous author of the Patent Troll Tracker blog, focusing on the subject of "patent trolls" and "a must-read blog among top intellectual property litigators".

== Dispute ==
In October 2007, Frenkel posted anonymous comments through his Patent Troll Tracker blog about a patent infringement case in which Cisco was the defendant. Frenkel claimed that the plaintiff, a company named ESN, filed a lawsuit one day before the patent in the lawsuit was issued by the U.S. Patent and Trademark Office (which if true would have meant that ESN did not have legal standing). Frenkel also suggested that ESN's local counsel may have improperly convinced the Clerk of Court of the United States District Court for the Eastern District of Texas to change the date on the docket to reflect that the case was filed the next day. At that time, a $15,000 bounty for his identity had also been offered by Chicago attorney Raymond Niro Sr.

== Litigation claims ==
After Frenkel publicly revealed his identity on February 23, 2008, in the entry titled "Live by anonymity, die by anonymity", the attorneys for ESN, T. John Ward, Jr., the son of East Texas federal Judge T. John Ward, and Eric Albritton, filed defamation actions against Cisco and Frenkel. "The attorneys [were] seeking damages for shame, embarrassment, humiliation, mental pain, and anguish. Further, the attorneys state[d] injuries to their "business reputation, good name, and standing in the community, and [would] be exposed to the hatred, contempt, and ridicule of the public in general as well as of his business associates, clients, friends, and relatives."

=== Issues ===
The case raised questions about the risks of blogging anonymously, and received wide publicity in the blogosphere as it was thought that the lawsuits could result in precedents to be applied to future bloggers. Subsequently, Cisco updated its policy on employee blogging.

== Trial ==
The Albritton case went to trial in Tyler, Texas on September 14, 2009. After Judge Richard A. Schell ruled that Albritton had to prove actual malice to be eligible for punitive damages, the litigation settled. The Ward case—which was filed against Cisco and not Frenkel—settled in January 2010.

== Career change ==
Frenkel left Cisco in August 2008 to join the Palo Alto office of Wilson Sonsini Goodrich & Rosati as a patent litigator. He was a partner with the firm. At the time he joined the firm, he said he was done with blogging. As of 2022, Frenkel was a partner at the law firm of Latham & Watkins.

== Bibliography ==
- Richard G. Frenkel, Intellectual Property in the Balance: Proposals for Improving Industrial Design Protection in the Post-TRIPS Era, 32 Loy. L.A. L. Rev. 531, 541 (1999) (pdf)

=== Primary sources ===
- Ward v. Cisco and Frenkel Case No. 2007-2502-A (pdf)
- Albritton v. Cisco and Frenkel Case No. 2008-481-CCL2 (pdf)
- Dennis Crouch, Troll Tracker, Defamation, and Splitting the Bar, PatentlyO blog, March 12, 2008
