= TC Heartland LLC v. Kraft Foods Group Brands LLC =

- Supreme Court of the United States

Argued March 27, 2017 Decided May 22, 2017
- Full case name: TC Heartland LLC v. Kraft Foods Group Brands LLC
- Docket no.: 16-341
- Citations: 581 U.S. 258 (more) 137 S. Ct. 1514; 197 L. Ed. 2d 816; 122 U.S.P.Q.2d 1553

Case history
- Prior: In re TC Heartland LLC, 821 F.3d 1338, 118 U.S.P.Q.2d 1591 (Fed. Cir. 2016); cert. granted, 137 S. Ct. 614 (2016).

Holding
- For patent infringement cases, a corporate defendant is considered to "reside" in their state of incorporation.

Court membership
- Chief Justice John Roberts Associate Justices Anthony Kennedy · Clarence Thomas; Ruth Bader Ginsburg · Stephen Breyer; Samuel Alito · Sonia Sotomayor; Elena Kagan · Neil Gorsuch

Case opinion
- Majority: Thomas, joined by Roberts, Kennedy, Ginsburg, Breyer, Alito, Sotomayor, Kagan
- Gorsuch took no part in the consideration or decision of the case.

Laws applied
- 28 U.S.C. § 1391, § 1400

TC Heartland LLC v. Kraft Foods Group Brands LLC, 581 U.S. 258 (2017), was a United States Supreme Court case concerning the venue in patent infringement lawsuits.

While a 1957 Supreme Court ruling had determined that patent infringement cases were to be tried in the state within which the defendant was incorporated, subsequent changes to Judiciary and Judicial Procedure implemented by Congress had led courts to rule that infringement cases could be brought anywhere the defendant conducted business considered infringing. This enabled plaintiffs to forum shop for courts favorable to them. The United States District Court for the Eastern District of Texas had become the most popular court for such cases, encouraging many non-practicing entities—so-called "patent trolls"—to use this court to seek litigation and settlements from larger companies.

The Court ruled unanimously in favor of the petitioner, upholding its 1957 decision that patent infringement cases must be heard in the district within which the defendant is incorporated.

== Background ==
United States law under Title 28 of the United States Code (U.S.C.) covering judiciary procedure states that patent infringement lawsuits are to be held in the district court where the defendant (the party charged with patent infringement) "resides", under 28 U.S.C. § 1400(b). Congress added clarifying language in 1988 to the general statute related to civil cases, 28 U.S.C. § 1391(c)(2), stating that for a corporation, its place of residence is "in any judicial district in which such defendant is subject to the court’s personal jurisdiction with respect to the civil action in question". Subsequent rulings by federal courts effectively allowed plaintiffs in patent infringement cases to select any district court in whose jurisdiction the defendant did business, e.g., where it sold its products. This determination had been most recently affirmed in a 1990 case VE Holding Corporation v. Johnson Gas Appliance Company in the United States Court of Appeals for the Federal Circuit. Congress amended 28 U.S.C. § 1391 again in 2011, but did not change how courts interpreted the venue system.

This effectively allowed plaintiffs to file suit in nearly any district court of their choosing, arguing that defendants that sold products anywhere in the United States were doing business in that court's jurisdiction, creating a type of forum shopping. This led to a large number of patent infringement cases being filed in the United States District Court for the Eastern District of Texas. The Eastern District of Texas was considered to be favorable to plaintiffs: trials were resolved quickly and plaintiffs prevailed in 75% of cases. The speedy resolution of cases was in part due to procedures set up by Judge T. John Ward, appointed to the court in 1999, that kept patent infringement cases to a strict time table. In 2017, the Eastern District of Texas saw the most patent infringement cases of any district court, with one judge overseeing 25% of all such cases in the nation. The United States District Court for the District of Delaware also sees a large number of such cases, partly because of the many businesses incorporated in Delaware.

The Eastern District of Texas attracted a large number of non-practicing entities, derogatorily known as "patent trolls", in addition to other patent infringement complaints. These are individuals or companies that do not actually do business but who have gained ownership of patents which most others would see as low-quality patents that are either overly broad or lack inventiveness. These entities file suit against other companies for patent infringement, typically as means to coerce settlement prior to trial or anticipating a victory in the district court of their choosing. A study found that since 2014, more than 90% of the patent infringement cases heard in the Eastern District of Texas were from such non-practicing entities.

== Case background ==
Kraft Foods sued TC Heartland, another food manufacturer, of patent infringement related to one of its low-calorie sweeteners. Kraft Foods sought legal action in the District of Delaware despite the fact that TC Heartland, an Indiana-based company, had no physical presence in Delaware. TC Heartland sought to change the venue to the Southern District of Indiana, citing the Supreme Court decision in Fourco Glass Co. v. Transmirra Products Corp. 353 U.S. 222–226 (1957) that for purposes of patent infringement suits, a corporation "resides" in the state within which it was incorporated. The District Court, and subsequently the United States Court of Appeals for the Federal Circuit, rejected TC Heartland's argument, stating that the amended language of 28 U.S.C. § 1391 since the decision of Fourco clarified how to determine where a company resides and that past cases at the District and Appeals Court have relied on this interpretation.

== Supreme Court ==
TC Heartland filed a writ of certiorari to the Supreme Court in September 2016, specifically addressing whether the interpretation of "resides" in 28 U.S.C. § 1400 can be affected by the amendments made to 28 U.S.C. § 1391; the Court granted certiorari in December 2016. Supporting TC Heartland via amicus briefs included a number of computer, technology, banking, and retail companies such as Apple, eBay, IBM, Microsoft, Intel, and Walmart that sought to eliminate the means that their patents are challenged by non-practicing entities, as well as seventeen states. Amicus briefs in opposition to TC Heartland included a number of pharmaceutical companies, including Allergan, Merck, and Genentech, who stated the ability to decide the venue helped to fend themselves against generic drug manufacturers, and older companies like Ericsson and Whirlpool which have thousands of patents in their portfolio and having the choice of venue making it easy for them to deal with large number of patent infractions in a single location.

Oral arguments were heard before the eight-member court on March 27, 2017. Justice Neil Gorsuch had yet to be appointed at this time and did not participate in the decision. The petitioner, TC Heartland, was represented by James W. Dabney and patent law academic John F. Duffy. William F. Jay argued on behalf of the respondent, Kraft. Observers noted that the justices focused on their previous decision from Fourco and argued the Federal Circuit had been "ignoring our decision", as stated by Justice Elena Kagan. The question of the impact of a decision in favor of TC Heartland was raised, noting that a decision favoring TC Heartland would cause other District Courts, particularly Delaware's, to be loaded with patent infringement cases.

The Court issued its decision on June 26, 2017, ruling unanimously that the definition of "reside" in 28 U.S.C. § 1400 remains as determined by the Court in Fourco to be the state of incorporation for a company. Justice Clarence Thomas, writing the opinion, found that the 2011 updates to 28 U.S.C. § 1391 did not contradict the Fourco decision, nor incorporated elements of the ruling from VE Holdings, and thus, their decision of Fourco still holds. The Court reversed the decision of the Appeals Court and remanded the case back to them.

== Impact ==
A separate patent infringement case, Raytheon Co. v. Cray, Inc., brought to the Eastern District of Texas during the Supreme Court case. Cray argued for a change of venue claiming it did not have a place of business in the district. Chief Judge James Gilstrap for the District Court initially ruled in April 2017 prior to the Supreme Court decision that Raytheon could seek action against Cray in the district. Following the Supreme Court's decision in TC Heartland in May 2017, Cray requested Gilstrap to re-evaluate the case under this ruling. Gilstrap did issue a new ruling, though still denying the change of venue. Gilstrap created a four-point test to evaluate whether a defendant had "regular and established place of business" in the district, and as Cray had a single sales representative living within the district, he denied the motion to change venue. Cray appealed to the Federal Circuit, which was heard after the TC Heartland decision. The Federal Circuit applied the Supreme Court's reasoning to reverse Gilstrap's ruling and allowed Cray's motion to transfer the case to proceed. Coupled with the TC Heartland ruling, this decision was seen to prevent further attempts by plaintiffs to forum shop for a desired court.

The filing of such cases in the Eastern District of Texas, formerly the leader in such suits, dropped after this decision. Meanwhile, the filing of such cases in the District of Delaware increased.
