= Joseph Sheehy =

Joseph Sheehy may refer to:

- Joseph Warren Sheehy (1910–1967), American judge
- Joseph Aloysius Sheehy (1900–1971), Australian judge
