= Judge Cecil =

Judge Cecil may refer to:

- Lamar John Ryan Cecil (1902–1958), judge of the United States District Court for the Eastern District of Texas
- Lester LeFevre Cecil (1893–1982), judge of the United States Court of Appeals for the Sixth Circuit
