= Randolph Bryant =

American judge (1893–1951)

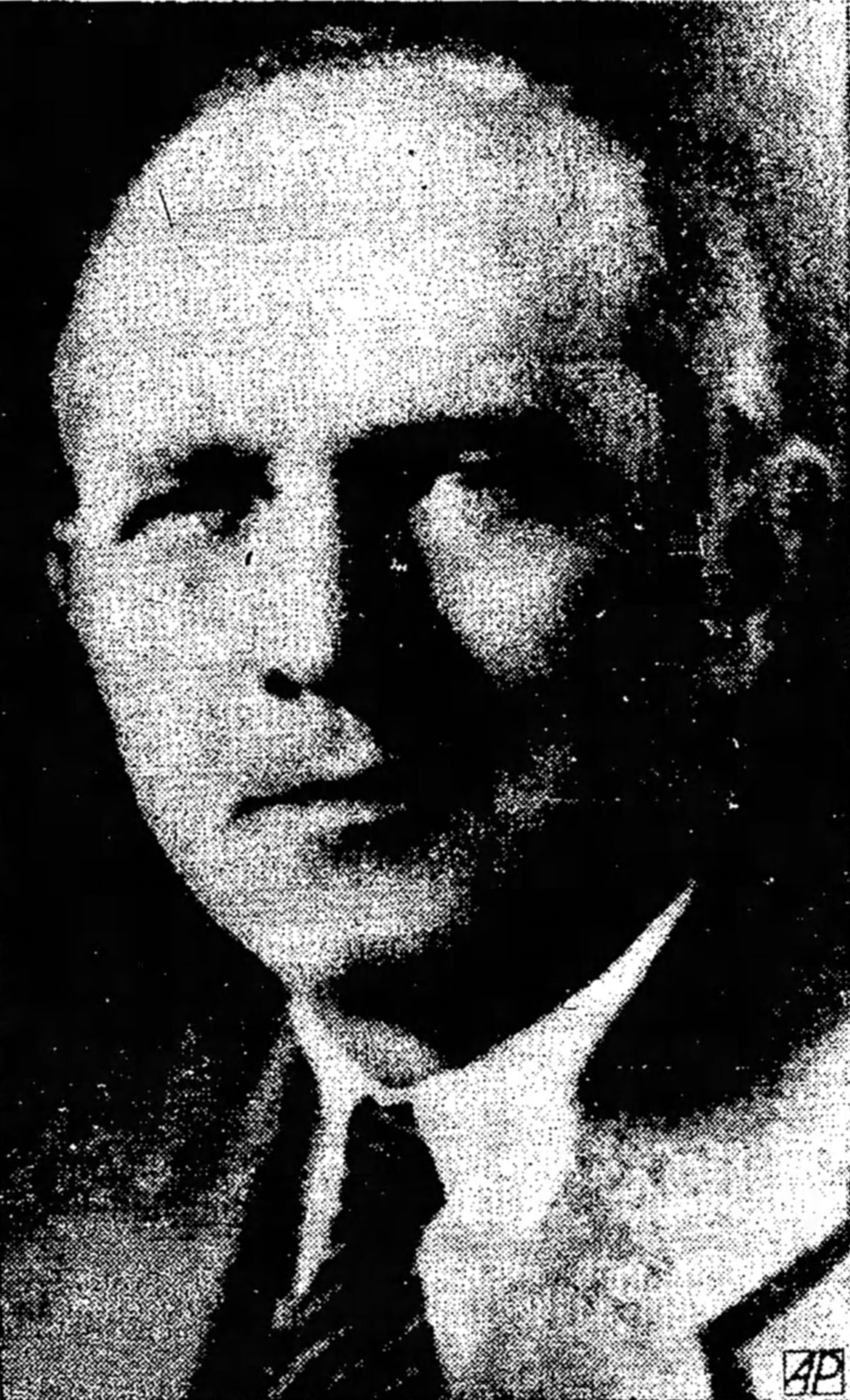

Judge of the United States District Court for the Eastern District of Texas
- In office January 24, 1931 – April 24, 1951
- Appointed by: Herbert Hoover
- Preceded by: William Lee Estes
- Succeeded by: Joseph Warren Sheehy

Personal details
- Born: Randolph Bryant; May 2, 1893 Sherman, Texas
- Died: April 24, 1951 (aged 57)
- Education: University of Texas, Austin (BA, LLB)

Randolph Bryant (May 2, 1893 – April 24, 1951) was a United States district judge of the United States District Court for the Eastern District of Texas.

== Education and career ==
Born in Sherman, Texas, Bryant received a Bachelor of Arts degree from the University of Texas at Austin in 1913 and a Bachelor of Laws from the University of Texas School of Law in 1916. He was a Captain in the United States Army during World War I from 1917 to 1919. He entered private practice in Sherman from 1919 to 1921 and was thereafter the United States Attorney for the Eastern District of Texas from 1921 to 1931.

== Federal judicial service ==
On December 3, 1930, Bryant was nominated by President Herbert Hoover to a seat on the United States District Court for the Eastern District of Texas vacated by Judge William Lee Estes. Bryant was confirmed by the United States Senate on January 13, 1931, and received his commission on January 24, 1931. He served in that capacity until his death on April 24, 1951.

== Sources ==
Legal offices
| Preceded by William Lee Estes | Judge of the United States District Court for the Eastern District of Texas; 1931–1951 | Succeeded by Joseph Warren Sheehy |
