= Baylor Law School =

Private law school in Waco, Texas, US

Coordinates: 31.5545°N 97.1154°W

Baylor University School of Law
- Parent school: Baylor University
- Religious affiliation: Baptist General Convention of Texas
- Established: 1857; 169 years ago (original); 1920; 106 years ago (re-establishment)
- School type: Private law school
- Dean: Jeremy Counseller
- Location: Waco, Texas, U.S.
- Enrollment: 448 (2009)
- Faculty: 31 full-time (2009)
- USNWR ranking: 34th (tie) (2026)
- Bar pass rate: 91.61% (2023)
- Website: law.baylor.edu

Baylor Law School is the oldest law school in Texas. Baylor Law School is affiliated with Baylor University and located in Waco, Texas. The school has been accredited by the American Bar Association since 1931 and has been a member of the Association of American Law Schools since 1938. The program offers training in all facets of law, including theoretical analysis, practical application, legal writing, advocacy, professional responsibility, and negotiation and counseling skills.

== History ==
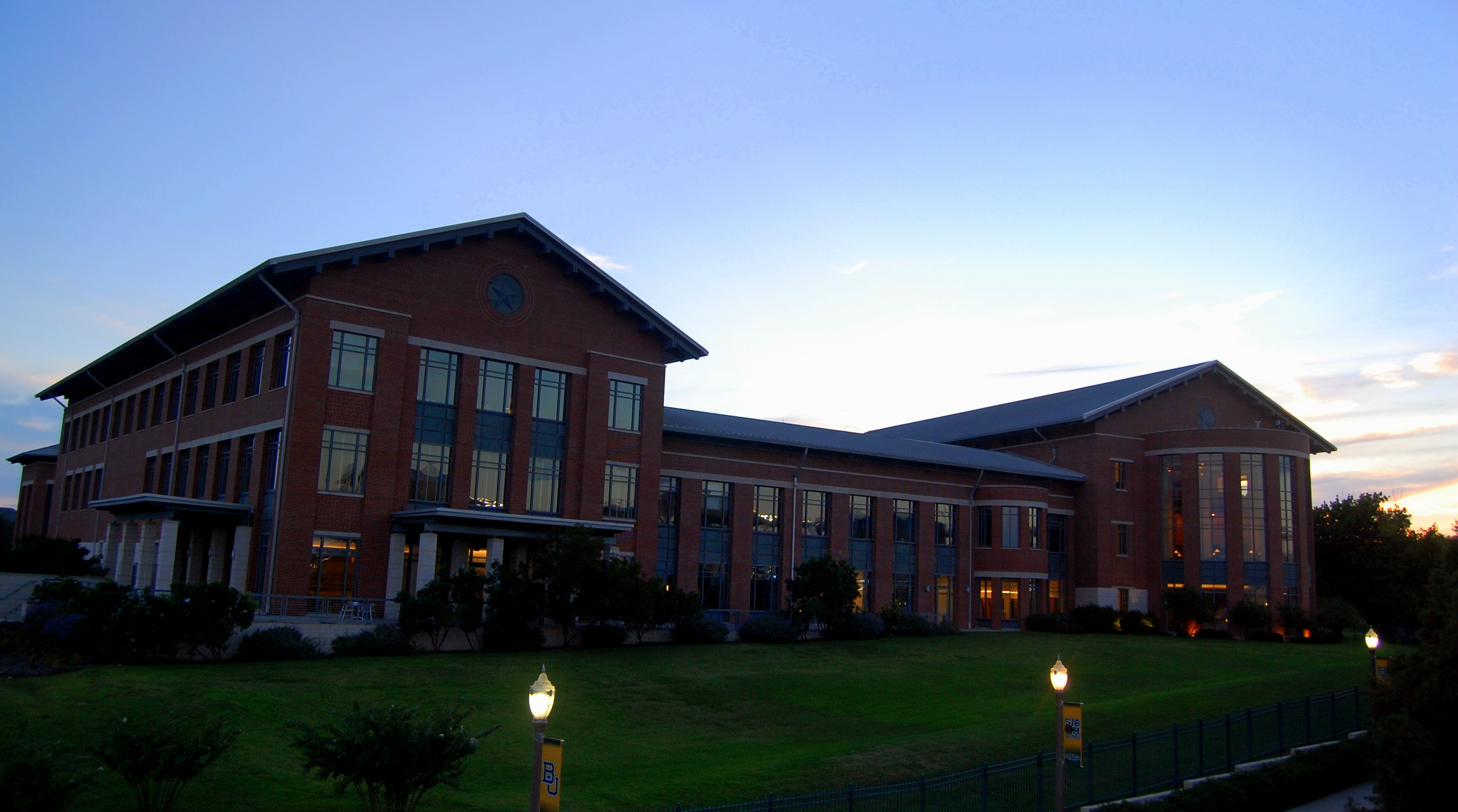
Baylor Law School at dusk

Established in 1857, Baylor Law School was the first law school in Texas and the second law school west of the Mississippi River. Law classes continued until 1883 when the school was discontinued. In 1920, the Board of Trustees reestablished the law school (called the Law Department at that time) under the direction of Dean Allen G. Flowers. The school was temporarily suspended from 1943 to 1946 as a result of World War II.

Bradley J.B. Toben served as Dean of the Law School from 1991 until 2023. At one time, Toben was the longest serving dean in the nation among the 200 ABA accredited law schools. On July 1, 2024, Jeremy Counseller began serving as Dean of the Law School after a nationwide search ended in his selection. An alumnus of Baylor Law School, Counseller returned as a professor in 2003 and taught civil procedure and evidence courses before becoming dean.

== Academics ==
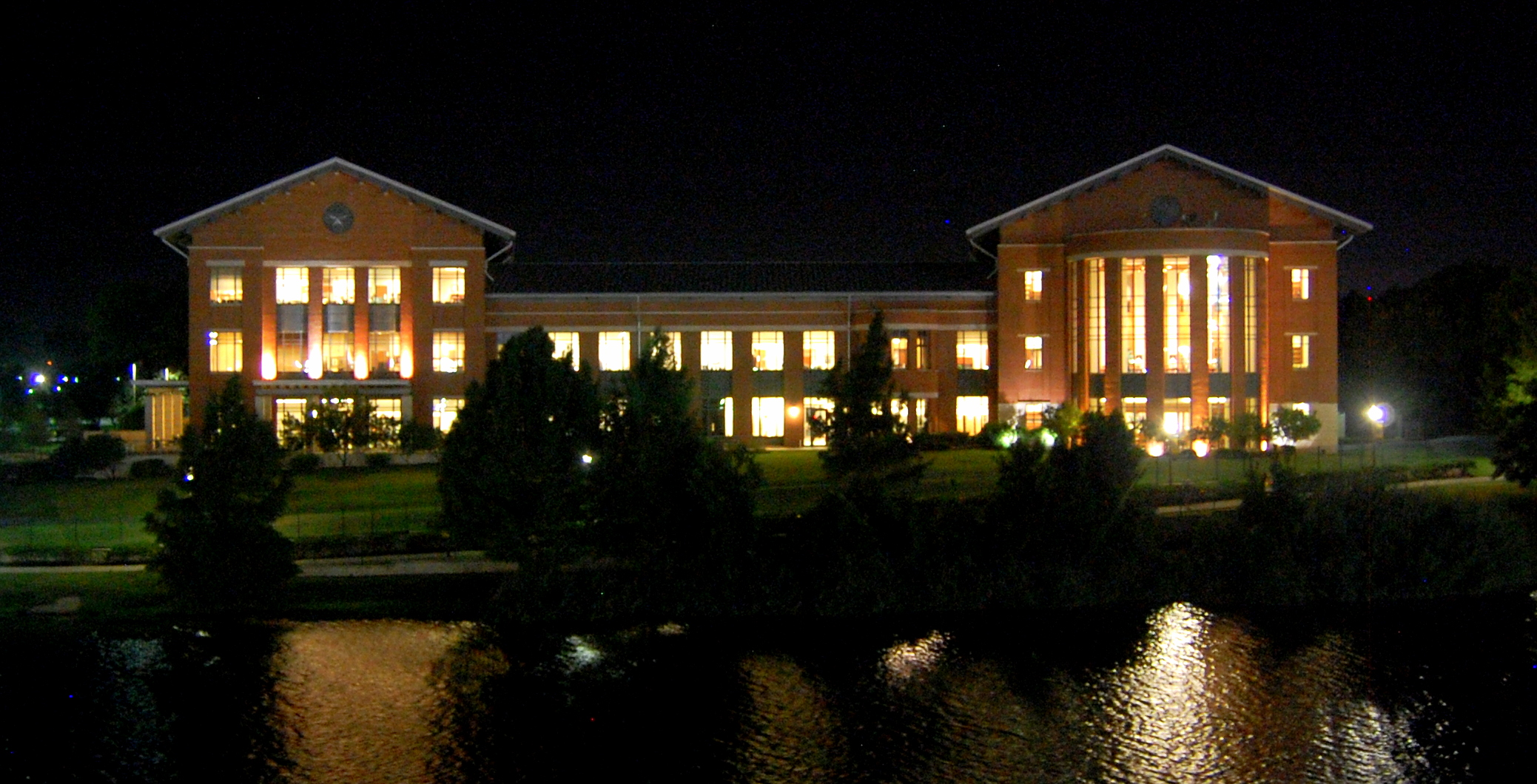
Baylor Law School on the banks of the Brazos River.

=== Admissions ===
For the classes entering in 2022, Baylor Law School accepted 23.8% of applicants and 17.57% of those accepted enrolled with the average enrollee having a 163 LSAT score and 3.72 undergraduate GPA.

=== Class structure ===
The school operates on a quarter system and has four graduating classes per year. Each matriculate class has a separate application pool and applicants are required to apply to the quarter in which they would like to begin.

A typical academic year consists of three quarters, with students choosing to take off the fourth quarter of the year to complete a clerkship or internship; however, students may elect to complete the program in only 27 months by attending every quarter. The school's curriculum focuses more on the positive state of the law than a normative one and on actual practice in the court system.

=== Degrees ===
In addition to the standard Juris Doctor degree, Baylor Law students can obtain a combined JD with either the Master of Business Administration (both traditional and with an emphasis in healthcare administration), the Master of Taxation, the Master of Public Policy and Administration, or the Master of Divinity degree.

=== First-year program ===
First-year students are required to take the following courses and satisfactory completion is required before moving to upper-level courses. The required courses are:

- Civil Procedure
- Constitutional Law: Structure, Power and Legislation
- Contracts
  - Contracts 1
  - Contracts 2
- Criminal Law
- Criminal Procedure
- Legal Analysis, Research, and Communication (LARC)
  - LARC 1 -- Introduction to Legal Writing (Part 1)
  - LARC 2 -- Introduction to Legal Writing (Part 2)
  - LARC 3 -- Persuasive Communications
- Property
  - Property 1
  - Property 2
- Torts
  - Torts 1
  - Torts 2

=== Upper Class Required Courses ===
The following courses are mandatory upper-class courses for all students (Practice Court classes are shown separately):

- Business Organizations I
- Constitutional Law: Individual Liberties
- Legal Analysis, Research, and Communication (LARC)
  - LARC 4 -- Transactional Drafting
  - LARC 5 -- Litigation Drafting
- Remedies
- Taxation and Accounting Principles for Lawyers
- Trusts and Estates

==== Practice Court ====
The hallmark of the law school curriculum is its Practice Court program. Practice Court traces its roots to the original school; it was returned in 1922 shortly after the school was reinstituted. Though Practice Court is designed primarily for students who will practice law before Texas trial courts, it is mandatory for all students.

The program consists of four courses. Students should plan to attend lectures from 7:45 AM and then be available to participate in course work from 1:00 PM onward each weekday for Practice Court 1 and 2 and should expect to work late into the evenings.

- Practice Court 1: Pre-Trial Practice & Procedure
- Practice Court 2: Trial Evidence, Procedure & Practice
- Practice Court 3: Trial and Post-Trial Practice, Procedure & Evidence (this includes the "Big Trial", whereby students are assigned to represent a party; the students must file pleadings, engage in discovery, conduct jury selection, argue their case, and engage in post-trial motion practice to secure their judgment).
- Professional Responsibility

A student can, if desired, choose to concentrate in one of fifteen specialized areas of law:

- Administrative Practice
- Business Litigation
- Business Planning
- Commercial Law
- Criminal Practice
- Estate Planning
- Family Law Practice
- Fiduciary Litigation
- General Civil Litigation
- Healthcare Law
- Intellectual Property
- Intellectual Property Litigation
- Personal Injury Litigation
- Public Interest Law
- Real Estate and Natural Resources

== Law review ==
Baylor Law Review
- Language: English

Publication details
- History: 1948–present
- Frequency: 3/year

Standard abbreviations
- Bluebook: Baylor L. Rev.
- ISO 4: Bayl. law rev.

Indexing
- ISSN: 0005-7274
- OCLC no.: 818986563

Links
- Journal homepage

The Baylor Law Review is the law school's official student-run law review. The journal was founded in 1948 and is published three times per year (Fall, Winter and Spring). Students may grade on to the Law Review at the end of their first year or later as upper-quarters, being selected through a write-on competition, or writing a note or comment for the journal that is selected for publication.

== Legal clinics ==
Students can gain experience by working Baylor Law's legal clinics. Baylor Law currently has five legal clinics: Estate Planning, Immigration, Intellectual Property and Entrepreneurship, Trial Advocacy, and the Veterans Clinic. Over the past few years, more than 1,500 central Texans have been served by Baylor Law students, faculty, and volunteer attorneys.

Baylor Law's Director of Clinical Programs, Josh Borderud, was selected in early 2020 to receive the prestigious Sandra Day O'Connor Award for Professional Service from the American Inns of Court. The Sandra Day O'Connor Award for Professional Service is awarded each year to honor an American Inn of Court member in practice for ten or fewer years for excellence in public interest or pro bono activities.

== Bar examination passage ==
In 2023, the overall bar examination passage rate for the law school’s first-time examination takers was 91.61%. The Ultimate Bar Pass Rate, which the ABA defines as the passage rate for graduates who sat for bar examinations within two years of graduating, was 96.11% for the class of 2021.

== Employment ==
According to Baylor's official 2019 ABA-required disclosures, 93.7% of the Class of 2019 obtained full-time, long-term, JD-required employment nine months after graduation. Baylor's Law School Transparency under-employment score is 3.9%, indicating the percentage of the Class of 2019 unemployed, pursuing an additional degree, or working in a non-professional, short-term, or part-time job nine months after graduation.

== Costs ==
The total cost of attendance (indicating the cost of tuition, fees, and living expenses) at Baylor for the 2022-23 academic year is $87,284. The Law School Transparency estimated debt-financed cost of attendance for three years is $310,638.

== Rankings ==
- Baylor Law School ranked No. 34 in U.S. News & World Report's 2026 edition of "America's Best Law Schools".
- In its 2021 law specialties rankings, U.S. News & World Report ranked Baylor Law's Trial Advocacy program as the second best in the nation.
- Above the Law ranked Baylor Law School at No. 33 in 2016.
- Baylor Law is ranked #29 nationally in terms of bar passage rate among first-time test takers (92.1%), and it outperforms by +17.6% the state of Texas's overall bar passage rate of 74.5%.
- Baylor Law ranks #34 in terms of graduates employed ten months after graduation (85.4%) and #77 in terms of graduates employed at the time of graduation (51.5%).
- Baylor Law is tied for #53 in terms of the median starting salary among graduates working in private practice as law firm associates ($85,000).
- Baylor Law is tied for #24 in terms of median starting salary among graduates working in government jobs or judicial clerkships at the federal or state level ($61,105).

== Notable alumni ==
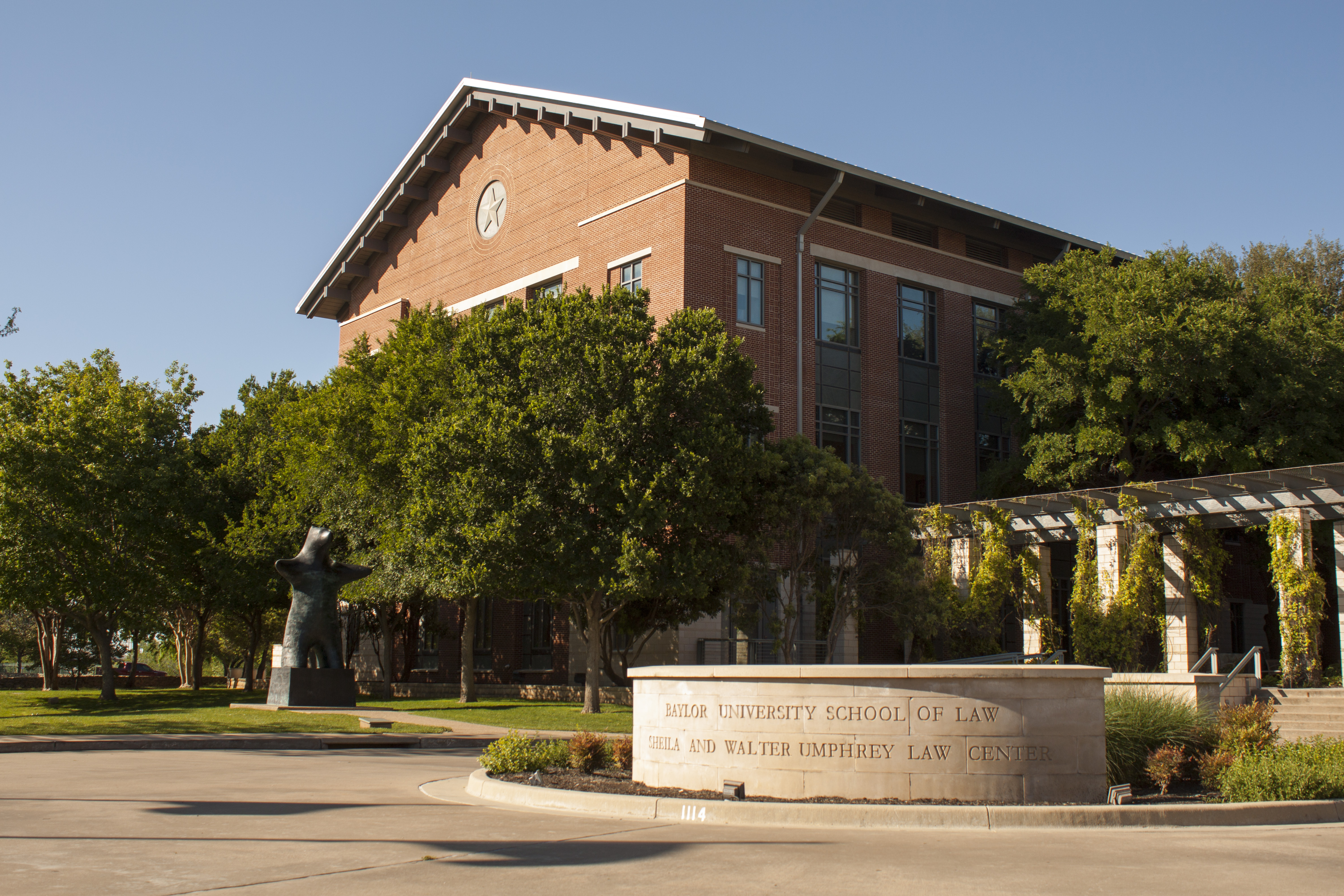
Baylor University School of Law as seen from the front

- James B. Adams – Texas legislator, and former acting director of the Federal Bureau of Investigation (15 to 23 February 1978)
- Phillip Baldwin – Justice, U.S. Court of Appeals for the Federal Circuit
- Charles Wallace Barrow – Former Justice, Texas Supreme Court
- Beau Boulter – U.S. Congressman (1985–1989)
- Bob Bullock – Texas' 38th Lieutenant Governor
- Tim Curry – District attorney of Tarrant County from 1972 to 2009
- Marion Price Daniel (1932) – United States Senator (1953—1957); Governor of Texas (1957—1963); Texas Attorney General (1947—1953); Speaker of the Texas House of Representatives (1943–1945); Justice, Texas Supreme Court (1971–1978).
- Leonard Davis – Judge, United States District Court for the Eastern District of Texas (2002–2015)
- Jack M. Fields – U.S. Congressman (1981–1997)
- Sidney A. Fitzwater – Judge, U.S. District Court, Northern District of Texas (1986–present)
- James Rodney Gilstrap - Judge, United States District Court for the Eastern District of Texas (2011–present)
- Louie Gohmert – U.S. Congressman (2005–present)
- Sam Blakely Hall Jr. – U.S. Congressman (1975–1985) and U.S. District Judge, Eastern District of Texas
- John Lee Hancock – Screenplay writer and director of The Rookie, The Alamo, and The Blind Side.
- Andrew S. Hanen – Judge, U.S. District Court, Southern District of Texas (2002–present)
- VADM John G. Hannink - 44th Judge Advocate General of the Navy
- Robert Heard – Reporter and journalist for the Associated Press
- Jack English Hightower (1951) – U.S. House of Representatives, (1975–1985)
- Ashley C. Hoff - U.S. Attorney for the Western District of Texas (2021–2022)
- Bryan Hughes (1995) – Republican member of the Texas Senate from District 1
- COL Leon Jaworski (1924) – Watergate Special Prosecutor; Senior Partner, Fulbright & Jaworski Houston, Texas; Served on the Warren Commission; President, American Bar Association (1971–1972); Chief of War Crimes detachment of the JAG Corps of the US Army (1944–1946); Treasurer and co-founder, Democrats for Reagan.
- James E. Kinkeade – Judge, United States District Court for the Northern District of Texas (2002–Present)
- Tim Kleinschmidt, J.D. (1981) - Member of the Texas House of Representatives from Giddings; city attorney in Giddings and Lexington
- Tryon D. Lewis, J.D. – Member of the Texas House of Representatives from Odessa; former 161st State Judicial District judge
- Thomas C. Mann- U.S. Ambassador to El Salvador (1955–1957) and US Ambassador to Mexico (1961–1963)
- K. Nicole Mitchell, J.D. (2006) – U.S. Magistrate Judge, U.S. District Court for the Eastern District of Texas (2013–present)
- Jeffrey L. Cureton, J.D. (1993) – U.S. Magistrate Judge, U.S. District Court for the Northern District of Texas (2010–present)
- Amos L. Mazzant III (J.D. 1990) – Judge, United States District Court for the Eastern District of Texas (2014-present)
- Priscilla Owen, J.D. (1977) – Judge, U.S. Fifth Circuit Court of Appeals (2005 – present); Former Texas Supreme Court Justice (1994–2005).
- Scott Walker, J.D. (1997) – Judge, Texas Court of Criminal Appeals (2017–present)
- William Robert (Bob) Poage (1924) – U.S. House of Representatives, (1937–1978)
- Graham B. Purcell, Jr., LL.B (1949) – U.S. representative from Texas' 13th congressional district from 1962 to 1973
- Kevin Reynolds – Former Texas lawyer and director of Fandango, Robin Hood: Prince of Thieves, and Waterworld.
- Max Sandlin – Judge, U.S. Congressman (1997–2005)
- William Sessions – Director of the FBI (1987–1993)
- Byron Tunnell – Former Speaker of the Texas House of Representatives
- T. John Ward – Judge, United States District Court for the Eastern District of Texas(1999–present)
- Kirk Watson – Mayor of Austin and former state senator
- Mark Wells White – Governor of Texas (1983–1987)
- John Eddie Williams – Counsel, Texas Tobacco Settlement (Baylor University's football field is named John Eddie Williams Field in recognition of Williams' donation to the program)
- Frank Wilson – U.S. Congressman (1947–1955)
