= Michael H. Schneider Sr. =

American judge (born 1943)

Michael Haygood Schneider Sr.

Senior Judge of the United States District Court for the Eastern District of Texas
- In office January 7, 2016 – October 1, 2016

Judge of the United States District Court for the Eastern District of Texas
- In office September 10, 2004 – January 7, 2016
- Appointed by: George W. Bush
- Preceded by: John H. Hannah Jr.
- Succeeded by: Jeremy Kernodle

Personal details
- Born: Michael Haygood Schneider; 1943 (age 81–82); San Antonio, Texas
- Education: Lon Morris College (AA); Stephen F. Austin State University (BS); University of Houston Law Center (JD); University of Virginia Law School (LLM)
- Occupation: Judge

Michael Haygood Schneider Sr. (born 1943) is a former United States district judge of the United States District Court for the Eastern District of Texas.

== Early life and education ==
Born in San Antonio, Texas, Schneider received an Associate of Arts degree from Lon Morris College in 1963, a Bachelor of Science degree from Stephen F. Austin State University in 1965, and a Juris Doctor from the University of Houston Law Center in 1970.

== Legal career ==
Schneider served as an assistant district attorney in the Harris County, Texas District Attorney's Office from 1971 to 1975, before entering private practice in Texas from 1975 to 1976. He was a general attorney of Dresser Industries from 1976 to 1980, also serving as a municipal judge (part-time) for the City of West University Place, Texas from 1978 to 1990. He was a general attorney of Bawden Drilling, Inc. from 1980 to 1986, and a general solicitor of the Union Pacific Railroad Company from 1986 to 1989, returning to private practice from 1989 to 1990.

== Judicial career ==
Schneider entered into his judicial career as presiding judge of the 157th District, Harris County, from 1990 to 1996, thereafter becoming chief justice of the First Court of Appeals of Texas in Houston, from 1996 to 2002. During that time, he also received a Master of Laws from the University of Virginia Law School in 2001. He was a justice of the Supreme Court of Texas from 2002 to 2004. On May 17, 2004, Schneider was nominated by President George W. Bush to a seat on the United States District Court for the Eastern District of Texas vacated by John H. Hannah Jr. Schneider was confirmed by the United States Senate on September 7, 2004, and received his commission on September 10, 2004. Schneider assumed senior status on January 7, 2016. He retired on October 1, 2016.

== Sources ==
Legal offices
Preceded by John H. Hannah Jr.	Judge of the United States District Court for the Eastern District of Texas; 2004–2016	Succeeded by Jeremy Kernodle
