= Bland Lake, Texas =

- Unincorporated community
- Location within Texas Location within the United States
- Coordinates: 31°35′25″N 94°06′42″W
- Country: United States
- State: Texas
- County: San Augustine
- Elevation: 367 ft (112 m)
- Time zone: UTC-6 (Central (CST))
  - Summer (DST): UTC-5 (CDT)
- Area code: 936
- GNIS feature ID: 1381456

Bland Lake (also Blandlake, Stop) is an unincorporated community in San Augustine County, Texas, United States.

== Notable person ==
Joseph Jefferson Fisher (1910–2000), United States District Court judge, was born in Bland Lake.
