= Joseph Warren Sheehy =

American judge (1910–1967)

Chief Judge of the United States District Court for the Eastern District of Texas
- In office 1954 – February 23, 1967
- Preceded by: Office established
- Succeeded by: Joseph Jefferson Fisher

Judge of the United States District Court for the Eastern District of Texas
- In office June 8, 1951 – February 23, 1967
- Appointed by: Harry S. Truman
- Preceded by: Randolph Bryant
- Succeeded by: William Wayne Justice

Personal details
- Born: October 21, 1910 Saratoga, Texas, U.S.
- Died: February 23, 1967 (aged 56)
- Party: Democratic
- Children: 2
- Education: Baylor University (LL.B.)
- Profession: Judge

Joseph Warren Sheehy (October 21, 1910 – February 23, 1967) was an American judge who served as a United States district judge of the United States District Court for the Eastern District of Texas.

== Biography ==
Sheehy was born on October 21, 1910, in Saratoga, Texas, to J. T. Sheehy and his wife. An attendee of Floresville High School, he studied at the University of Texas at Austin, then received a Bachelor of Laws from Baylor University School of Law in 1934. Beginning his practice in 1934, he was an assistant attorney general of the State of Texas from 1934 to 1935. He was in private practice in Tyler, Texas from 1935 to 1951, interrupted by his service in the United States Army Air Forces during World War II from 1942 to 1945, where he achieved the rank of Major.

A Democrat, Sheehy was nominated by President Harry S. Truman to a seat on the United States District Court for the Eastern District of Texas on May 16, 1951, after being left vacant by the death of Randolph Bryant. Sheehy was confirmed by the United States Senate on June 7, 1951, and received his commission on June 8, 1951; it was his first judicial role. He served as Chief Judge from 1954 until his death on February 23, 1967, aged 56. He married Mabel K. Putman on January 1, 1940, and he had two sons. He lived in Tyler.

Legal offices
Preceded by Randolph Bryant	Judge of the United States District Court for the Eastern District of Texas; 1951–1967	Succeeded by William Wayne Justice
Preceded by Office established	Chief Judge of the United States District Court for the Eastern District of Texas; 1954–1967	Succeeded by Joseph Jefferson Fisher
