= Sean D. Jordan =

American judge (born 1965)

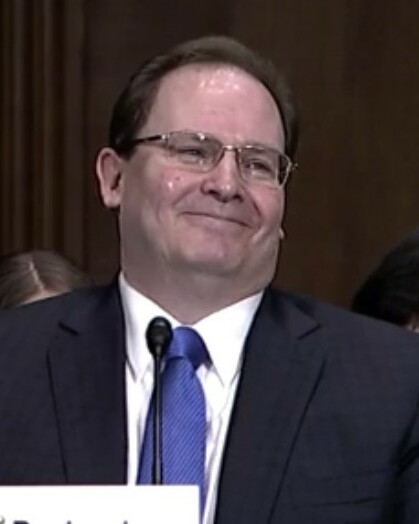

Judge of the United States District Court for the Eastern District of Texas
- Incumbent
- Assumed office August 20, 2019
- Appointed by: Donald Trump
- Preceded by: Richard A. Schell

Personal details
- Born: Sean Daniel Godwin Jordan; 1965 (age 60–61) New York City, U.S.
- Education: University of Texas, Austin (BA, JD)

Military service
- Allegiance: United States
- Branch/service: United States Army
- Years of service: 1983–1986
- Rank: Specialist
- Unit: 82nd Airborne Division
- Awards: Combat Infantryman Badge; United States Army Parachutist Badge

Sean Daniel Jordan (born 1965) is a United States district judge of the United States District Court for the Eastern District of Texas.

== Education ==
Jordan received his Bachelor of Arts, summa cum laude, from the University of Texas at Austin and his Juris Doctor, with honors, from the University of Texas School of Law.

== Career ==
Prior to entering private practice Jordan served as Principal Deputy Solicitor General for the State of Texas, representing the state in appeals in both federal and state courts. From 2012 to 2019, he was a partner in the Austin, Texas, office of Jackson Walker L.L.P. He was the co-chair of the firm's Appellate Practice Group, where his practice focused on appellate and complex civil litigation and regulatory compliance.

=== Military service ===
Jordan served in the United States Army as an infantryman and paratrooper in the 82nd Airborne Division.

=== Federal judicial service ===
On January 16, 2019, President Donald Trump announced his intent to nominate Jordan to serve as a United States district judge for the United States District Court for the Eastern District of Texas. On January 17, 2019, his nomination was sent to the Senate. President Trump nominated Jordan to the seat vacated by Judge Richard A. Schell, who assumed senior status on March 10, 2015. On March 5, 2019, a hearing on his nomination was held before the Senate Judiciary Committee. On April 4, 2019, his nomination was reported out of committee by a 12–10 vote. On July 30, 2019, the United States Senate invoked cloture on his nomination by a 54–36 vote. His nomination was confirmed later that day by a 54–34 vote. He received his judicial commission on August 20, 2019.

==== Notable cases ====
In 2024, Jordan blocked a Department of Labor rule raising the federal overtime exemption salary threshold, which would have extended overtime protections to an estimated 4 million additional workers.

In 2025, Jordan reversed a Consumer Financial Protection Bureau rule allowing medical debt to be removed from people's credit reports. The rule, established during the Biden administration, would have eliminated $50 billion in medical debt from reports, affecting the credit scores of about 15 million people. Jordan ruled in favor of the plaintiff, the Cornerstone Credit Union League, finding that the rule exceeded the authority of the federal bureau.

== Memberships ==
Jordan has been a member of the Federalist Society since 2016.

Legal offices
Preceded by Richard A. Schell	Judge of the United States District Court for the Eastern District of Texas; 2019–present	Incumbent
