= William Wayne Justice =

American judge (1920–2009)

Senior Judge of the United States District Court for the Eastern District of Texas
- In office June 30, 1998 – October 13, 2009

Chief Judge of the United States District Court for the Eastern District of Texas
- In office 1980–1990
- Preceded by: Joseph Jefferson Fisher
- Succeeded by: Robert Manley Parker

Judge of the United States District Court for the Eastern District of Texas
- In office June 7, 1968 – June 30, 1998
- Appointed by: Lyndon B. Johnson
- Preceded by: Joseph Warren Sheehy
- Succeeded by: T. John Ward

Personal details
- Born: William Wayne Justice; February 25, 1920 Athens, Texas, US
- Died: October 13, 2009 (aged 89) Austin, Texas, US
- Education: University of Texas School of Law (LL.B.)

William Wayne Justice (February 25, 1920 – October 13, 2009) was a United States district judge of the United States District Court for the Eastern District of Texas.

== Education and career ==
Born in Athens, Texas, Justice received a Bachelor of Laws from University of Texas School of Law in 1942. He was in the United States Army from 1942 to 1946. He was in private practice of law in Athens from 1946 to 1961. He was a city attorney of Athens from 1948 to 1950 and from 1952 to 1958. An active freemason, he was a member of Athens lodge No. 165. He was United States Attorney for the Eastern District of Texas from 1961 to 1968.

== Federal judicial service ==
Justice was nominated by President Lyndon B. Johnson on April 25, 1968, to a seat on the United States District Court for the Eastern District of Texas vacated by Judge Joseph Warren Sheehy. He was confirmed by the United States Senate on June 6, 1968, and received his commission on June 7, 1968. He served as Chief Judge from 1980 to 1990. He assumed senior status on June 30, 1998. His service terminated on October 13, 2009, due to his death in Austin, Texas.

=== Notable cases ===
In November 1970, Justice notably ordered the Texas Education Agency (TEA) to desegregate its schools in United States v. Texas, which is regarded as one of the most extensive desegregation orders in legal history as it encompassed over a thousand school districts and nearly two million students. It was upheld by the Court of Appeals for the Fifth Circuit. At that time, many schools in Texas, particularly those in East Texas, remained segregated and the Department of Health, Education, and Welfare (HEW) referred the matter to the Department of Justice as it had limited powers to enforce desegregation laws.

In 1972, Texas prison inmate David Ruiz filed a fifteen page handwritten civil rights complaint alleging he was confined under unconstitutional conditions, harassed by prison officials, given inadequate medical care, and subjected to unlawful solitary confinement. His complaint was combined with others to become a class action suit (Ruiz v. Estelle, 550 F.2d 238). The trial, which began in October 1978, lasted a year. In a 118-page, 1979 decision, Judge Justice ruled that the conditions of imprisonment within the TDC prison system constituted cruel and unusual punishment in violation of the United States Constitution. The decision led to federal oversight of the system, with a prison construction boom and "sweeping reforms ... that fundamentally changed how Texas prisons operated."

== Honors and recognition ==
In 2004, the William Wayne Justice Center for Public Interest Law was established in his honor at the University of Texas at Austin School of Law. The Justice Center promotes equal justice for all through legal education, scholarship and public service.

On November 16, 2006, Justice received the first "Morris Dees Justice Award" given annually to a lawyer who has devoted his career to serving the public interest and pursuing justice, and whose work has brought about positive change in the community, state, or nation. It was created by the international law firm of Skadden, Arps, Slate, Meagher & Flom LLP and The University of Alabama School of Law to honor Morris Dees for his lifelong devotion to public service. Dees, who is co-founder and chief trial counsel for the Southern Poverty Law Center in Montgomery, Alabama, presented the award at a ceremony in Skadden offices in New York City.

== Death ==
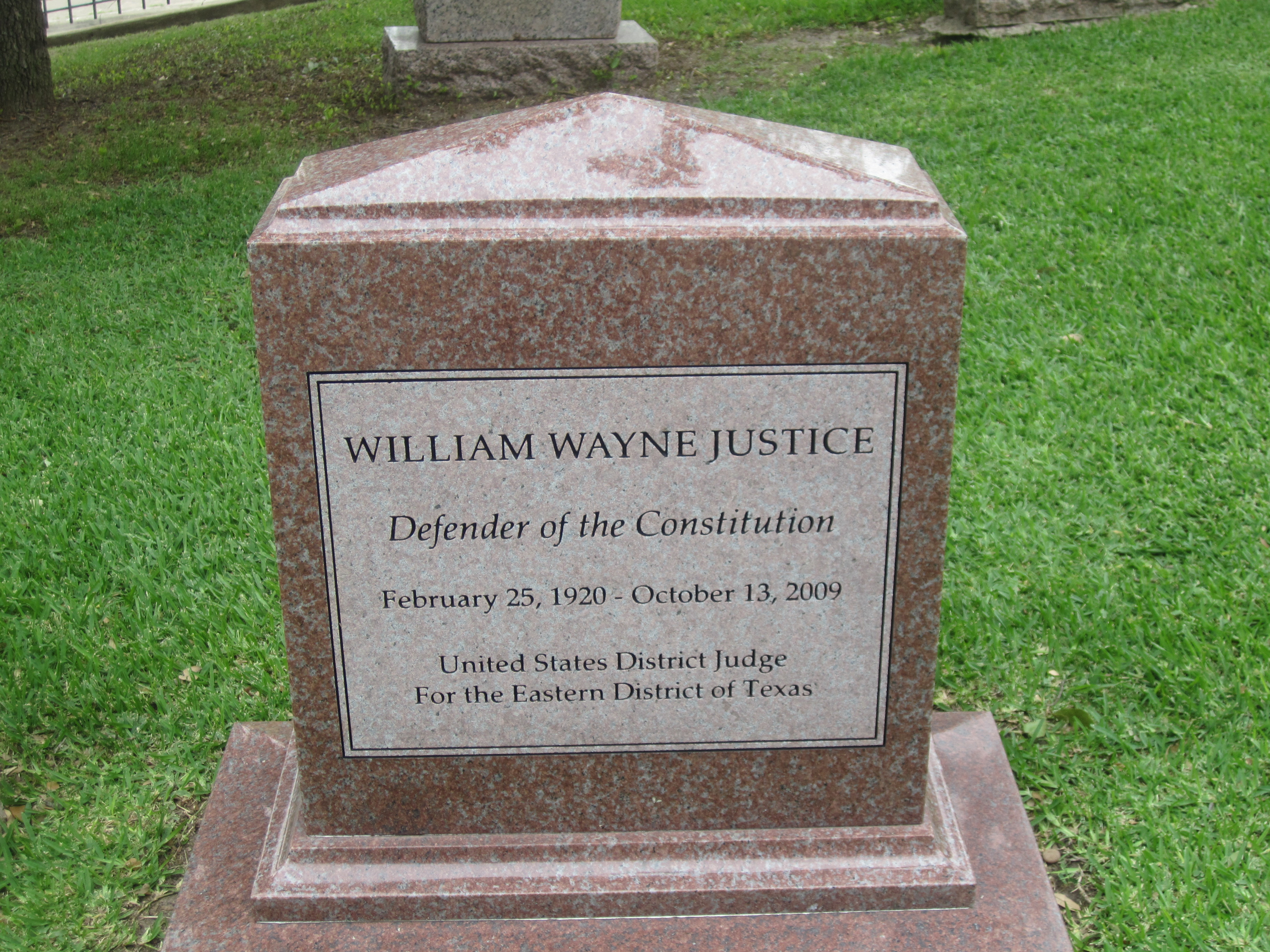
Judge Justice's tombstone at the Texas State Cemetery in Austin, Texas

Justice died on October 13, 2009, in Austin, Texas. Though Governor William Perry Clements Jr. had frequently quarreled with Justice, Bill Hobby, the Democrat from Houston and the lieutenant governor under both of Clements' nonconsecutive terms, lauded the judge: "Judge Justice dragged Texas into the 20th century. God bless him. He was very unpopular, but he was doing the right thing."

== Other notable cases ==
- Montgomery v. White, 320 F. Supp. 303 (E.D. Tex. 1969)
- Roper v. Beto, 318 F. Supp. 662 (E.D. Tex. 1970)
- United States v. Texas, 321 F. Supp. 1043 (E.D. Tex. 1970), supplemented by 330 F. Supp. 235 (E.D. Tex. 1971)
- Duke v. North Texas State University, 338 F. Supp. 990 (E.D. Tex. 1971)
- McGuire v. Roebuck, 347 F. Supp. 1111 (E.D. Tex. 1972)
- Graves v. Barnes, 343 F. Supp. 704 (W.D. Tex. 1972)
- Morales v. Turman, 383 F. Supp. 53 (E.D. Tex. 1974)
- Doe v. Plyer, 458 F. Supp. 569 (E.D. Tex. 1978)
- United States v. Hall, 468 F. Supp. 123 (E.D. Tex. 1979)
- Wells v. Hutchinson, 499 F. Supp. 174 (E.D. Tex. 1980)
- Jones v. Latexo Independent School District, 499 F. Supp. 223 (E.D. Tex. 1980)
- Young v. Pierce, 544 F. Supp. 1010 (E.D. Tex. 1982)
- Lelsz v. Kavanagh, 98 F.R.D. 11 (E.D. Tex. 1982)
- Nash v. Texas, 632 F. Supp. 951 (E.D. Tex. 1986)
- Young v. Pierce, 640 F. Supp. 1476 (E.D. Tex. 1986)
- Texans Against Censorship, Inc. v. State Bar of Texas, 888 F. Supp. 1328 (E.D. Tex. 1995)
- Ruiz v. Johnson, 37 F. Supp. 2d 855 (S.D. Tex. 1999)
- Frew v. Gilbert, 109 F. Supp. 2d 579 (E.D. Tex. 2000)
- Frew v. Hawkins, 401 F. Supp. 2d 619 (E.D. Tex. 2005)

== Publications in his honor ==
- Blais, Lynn E. "William Wayne Justice: The Life of the Law." Texas Law Review 77.1 (Nov. 1998): 1-7.
- "Dedication and Tributes. Judge William Wayne Justice." Annual Survey of American Law 1986 (Apr. 1987): vii-xx.
- Dubose, Louis. "A Texas 'Advocate for Justice.'" The Nation 13 November 2000: 20-22.
- Elliot, Janet. "Justice Recognized for a Career built on Seminal Cases." Houston Chronicle 4 December 2006.
- Gamino, Denise. "High-profile Justice Hitting Trail to Austin." The Austin-American Statesman 25 May 1998: A1.
- Hall, Michael. "Justice Is Not Done." Texas Monthly, October 2006.
- Hood, Lucy. "Educating Immigrant Students." Carnegie Reporter 4.2 (Spring 2007).
- Ivins, Molly. "Texas-size Void Left with Exodus of Judge Justice." The Fresno Bee, 13 May 1998: B7.
- Jackson, Bruce. "Texas Prisons Go On Trial." The Nation 28 October 1978: 437-9.
- Kemerer, Frank R. William Wayne Justice: A Judicial Biography. Austin: University of Texas Press, 1991.
- Klimko, Frank, and Evan Moore. "'Czar of Texas'/William Wayne Justice Takes Heavy Criticism with Grace." The Houston Chronicle 11 January 1987: 1.
- Maraniss, David. "Justice, Texas Style." The Washington Post 28 February 1987: G1.
- Martin, Steve J. Texas Prisons: The Walls Came Tumbling Down. Austin: Texas Monthly Press, 1987.
- Mithoff, Richard. "William Wayne Justice: Blessed by the Gifts of This Judicial Giant." The Houston Chronicle 15 November 1998: 1.
- Mithoff, Richard Warren. "A Tribute to Justice." Texas Law Review 77.9 (November 1998): 9-12.
- Politz, Henry A. "Judge Justice." Texas Law Review 77.13 (November 1998): 13-15.
- Vara-Orta, Francisco. "'Activist' Judge Still Battling Injustice." Austin American-Statesman 12 August 2006: 1.
- Walt, Kathy. "Judge Justice Left Footprints on Host of Social Reforms." The Houston Chronicle 8 February 1998: 1.
- Ward, Mike. "Judge Says Reforms Worked For Awhile [sic]." Austin American-Statesman 6 May 2007: A7.
- Ward, Mike. "Prisons Lawsuit Drawing to Close." Austin American-Statesman 8 June 2002:1

== Scholarly publications ==
- "Address: The Origins of Ruiz v. Estelle." Stanford Law Review 43 (November 1990): 1-12.
- "Burrs Under the Saddle." Texas Bar Journal 68 (July 2005): 609-610.
- "Law Day Address at the University of Texas at Austin: The Enlightened Jurisprudence of Justice Thurgood Marshall." Texas Law Review 71 (May 1993): 1099-1114.
- "The New Awakening: Judicial Activism in a Conservative Age." Southwestern Law Journal 43 (October 1989): 657-676.
- "Recognizing the Ninth Amendment's Role in Constitutional Interpretation." Texas Law Review 74 (May 1996): 1241-1244.
- "A Relativist Constitution." University of Colorado Law Review 52 (1980–1981): 19-32.
- "The Two Faces of Judicial Activism." George Washington Law Review 61 (November 1992): 1-13.

Legal offices
Preceded by Joseph Warren Sheehy	Judge of the United States District Court for the Eastern District of Texas; 1968–1998	Succeeded by T. John Ward
Preceded by Joseph Jefferson Fisher	Chief Judge of the United States District Court for the Eastern District of Texas; 1980–1990	Succeeded by Robert Manley Parker
