= William Lee Estes =

American judge

Judge of the United States District Court for the Eastern District of Texas
- In office February 18, 1920 – June 14, 1930
- Appointed by: Woodrow Wilson
- Preceded by: Gordon J. Russell
- Succeeded by: Randolph Bryant

Personal details
- Born: William Lee Estes; October 18, 1870 Boston, Texas, U.S.
- Died: June 14, 1930 (aged 59)
- Education: Hampden–Sydney College (A.B.); University of Texas School of Law (LL.B.)

William Lee Estes (October 18, 1870 – June 14, 1930) was a United States district judge of the United States District Court for the Eastern District of Texas.

== Education and career ==
Born in Boston, Texas, Estes received an Artium Baccalaureus degree from Hampden–Sydney College in 1891 and a Bachelor of Laws from the University of Texas School of Law in 1893. He was in private practice in Texarkana, Texas from 1894 to 1920.

== Federal judicial service ==
On February 14, 1920, Estes was nominated by President Woodrow Wilson to a seat on the United States District Court for the Eastern District of Texas vacated by Judge Gordon J. Russell. Estes was confirmed by the United States Senate on February 18, 1920, and received his commission the same day. He served in that capacity until his death on June 14, 1930.

== Sources ==
Legal offices
Preceded by Gordon J. Russell	Judge of the United States District Court for the Eastern District of Texas; 1920–1930	Succeeded by Randolph Bryant
