= Samuel D. Johnson Jr. =

American judge (1920–2002)

Senior Judge of the United States Court of Appeals for the Fifth Circuit
- In office May 10, 1991 – July 27, 2002

Judge of the United States Court of Appeals for the Fifth Circuit
- In office October 5, 1979 – May 10, 1991
- Appointed by: Jimmy Carter
- Preceded by: Seat established by 92 Stat. 1629
- Succeeded by: Robert Manley Parker

Personal details
- Born: Samuel D. Johnson Jr. November 17, 1920 Hubbard, Texas, U.S.
- Died: July 27, 2002 (aged 81) Austin, Texas, U.S.
- Education: Baylor University (BBA); University of Texas School of Law (LLB)

Samuel D. Johnson Jr. (November 17, 1920 – July 27, 2002) was a United States circuit judge of the United States Court of Appeals for the Fifth Circuit.

== Education and career ==
Born in Hubbard, Texas, Johnson was in the United States Army as a Private during World War II, from 1942 to 1945. He received a Bachelor of Business Administration from Baylor University in 1946 and a Bachelor of Laws from the University of Texas School of Law in 1949. He was in private practice in Hillsboro, Texas from 1949 to 1953. He was the county attorney of Hill County, Texas from 1953 to 1955. He was the district attorney of Hillsboro from 1955 to 1959. He was a judge of the District Court for the 66th Judicial District from 1959 to 1965. He was the Director of the Houston Legal Foundation in Houston, Texas from 1965 to 1967. He was a judge of the 14th Court of Appeals of the State of Texas from 1967 to 1973. He was an associate justice of the Supreme Court of Texas from 1973 to 1979.

== Federal judicial service ==
Johnson was nominated by President Jimmy Carter on August 10, 1979, to the United States Court of Appeals for the Fifth Circuit, to a new seat created by 92 Stat. 1629. He was confirmed by the United States Senate on October 4, 1979, and received his commission on October 5, 1979. He assumed senior status on May 10, 1991. Johnson served in that capacity until his death on July 27, 2002, in Austin, Texas.

== Sources ==
Legal offices
Preceded by Seat established by 92 Stat. 1629	Judge of the United States Court of Appeals for the Fifth Circuit; 1979–1991	Succeeded by Robert Manley Parker
