= Robert Manley Parker =

American judge (1937–2020)

Judge of the United States Court of Appeals for the Fifth Circuit
- In office June 16, 1994 – November 1, 2002
- Appointed by: Bill Clinton
- Preceded by: Samuel D. Johnson Jr.
- Succeeded by: Edward C. Prado

Chief Judge of the United States District Court for the Eastern District of Texas
- In office February 1990 – June 17, 1994
- Preceded by: William Wayne Justice
- Succeeded by: Richard A. Schell

Judge of the United States District Court for the Eastern District of Texas
- In office April 26, 1979 – June 17, 1994
- Appointed by: Jimmy Carter
- Preceded by: Seat established by 92 Stat. 1629
- Succeeded by: Thad Heartfield

Personal details
- Born: Robert Manley Parker; October 19, 1937 Longview, Texas, U.S.
- Died: August 27, 2020 (aged 82) Tyler, Texas, U.S.
- Education: Kilgore College; United States Naval Academy; East Texas Baptist University; Abilene Christian University; University of Texas at Austin (BBA); University of Texas School of Law (LLB)

Robert Manley Parker (October 19, 1937 – August 27, 2020) was a United States circuit judge of the United States Court of Appeals for the Fifth Circuit.

== Early life and education ==
Born in Longview, Texas, Parker grew up in Hallsville, Texas and was named class president of his class at Hallsville High School. After high school, Parker entered Kilgore College before entering the United States Naval Academy. He returned to Texas in 1958, got married and began taking classes part-time at East Texas Baptist University and Abilene Christian University. Parker earned a Bachelor of Business Administration degree in 1961 from the University of Texas at Austin and a Bachelor of Laws from the University of Texas School of Law in 1964.

== Professional career ==
Parker worked in private legal practice in Gilmer, Texas from 1964 until 1965, and then in his native Longview in 1965. From 1965 until 1966, he worked as an administrative assistant to United States Representative Ray Roberts. He then worked in private law practice in Longview from 1966 until 1971, in private legal practice in Fort Worth from 1971 until 1972, and back in Longview as a partner in the firm Nichols & Parker from 1972 until joining the federal bench in 1979.

== Federal judicial service ==
Parker was nominated by President Jimmy Carter on February 6, 1979, to the United States District Court for the Eastern District of Texas, to a new seat authorized by 92 Stat. 1629. He was confirmed by the United States Senate on April 24, 1979, and received commission on April 26, 1979. He served as Chief Judge, from 1990 to 1994. His service terminated on June 17, 1994, due to elevation to the Fifth Circuit.

Parker was nominated by President Bill Clinton on January 27, 1994, to a seat on the United States Court of Appeals for the Fifth Circuit vacated by Judge Samuel D. Johnson, Jr. He was confirmed by the Senate on June 15, 1994, and received commission on June 16, 1994. His service terminated on November 1, 2002, due to retirement.

== Return to private practice ==
After his retirement from the federal bench, Parker returned to private practice. In 2002 he formed the law firm of Parker, Bunt & Ainsworth in Tyler, Texas, specializing in patent litigation, business litigation and arbitration. He also served as a Trustee for the Haliburton Asbestos Trust.

== Sources ==
Legal offices
Preceded by Seat established by 92 Stat. 1629	Judge of the United States District Court for the Eastern District of Texas; 1979–1994	Succeeded by Thad Heartfield
Preceded by William Wayne Justice	Chief Judge of the United States District Court for the Eastern District of Texas; 1990–1994	Succeeded by Richard A. Schell
Preceded by Samuel D. Johnson Jr.	Judge of the United States Court of Appeals for the Fifth Circuit; 1994–2002	Succeeded by Edward C. Prado
