= David Folsom =

American judge

Chief Judge of the United States District Court for the Eastern District of Texas
- In office 2009–2012
- Preceded by: Thad Heartfield
- Succeeded by: Leonard Davis

Judge of the United States District Court for the Eastern District of Texas
- In office March 17, 1995 – March 17, 2012
- Appointed by: Bill Clinton
- Preceded by: Sam B. Hall Jr.
- Succeeded by: Robert W. Schroeder III

Personal details
- Born: David Folsom; March 12, 1947 (age 79) Murfreesboro, Arkansas, U.S.
- Spouse: Judy Sullivan
- Education: University of Arkansas (BA, JD)

David Folsom (born March 12, 1947) is a retired United States district judge of the United States District Court for the Eastern District of Texas.

== Education and career ==
Born in Murfreesboro, Arkansas, Folsom received a Bachelor of Arts degree from the University of Arkansas in 1969 and a Juris Doctor from the University of Arkansas School of Law in 1974.

He served as a school teacher at Arkansas Senior High School in Texarkana, Arkansas from 1969 to 1971.

He was in private practice in Texarkana, Texas from 1974 to 1995. He was a deputy prosecuting attorney of Lafayette County, Arkansas from 1978 to 1981.

== Federal judicial service ==
On January 11, 1995, Folsom was nominated by President Bill Clinton to a seat on the United States District Court for the Eastern District of Texas vacated by Sam B. Hall, Jr. Folsom was confirmed by the United States Senate on March 17, 1995, and received his commission the same day. He was Chief Judge from 2009 to 2012. He retired on March 17, 2012.

== Sources ==
Legal offices
Preceded by Sam B. Hall, Jr.	Judge of the United States District Court for the Eastern District of Texas; 1995–2012	Succeeded by Robert W. Schroeder III
Preceded by Thad Heartfield	Chief Judge of the United States District Court for the Eastern District of Texas; 2009–2012	Succeeded by Leonard Davis
