= John H. Hannah Jr. =

American judge

Chief Judge of the United States District Court for the Eastern District of Texas
- In office 2001 – December 4, 2003
- Preceded by: Richard A. Schell
- Succeeded by: Thad Heartfield

Judge of the United States District Court for the Eastern District of Texas
- In office March 11, 1994 – December 4, 2003
- Appointed by: Bill Clinton
- Preceded by: Seat established by 104 Stat. 5089
- Succeeded by: Michael H. Schneider Sr.

Secretary of State of Texas
- In office April 15, 1991 – March 1994
- Governor: Ann Richards
- Preceded by: George Bayoud
- Succeeded by: Ron Kirk

Member of the Texas House of Representatives from the 5th district
- In office January 10, 1967 – January 9, 1973
- Preceded by: Steve Burgess
- Succeeded by: Herman Adams, Jr.

Personal details
- Born: John Henry Hannah Jr. June 30, 1939 Nacogdoches County, Texas, U.S.
- Died: December 4, 2003 (aged 64) West Palm Beach, Florida, U.S.
- Party: Democratic
- Education: Sam Houston State University (BS)

Military service
- Branch/service: United States Navy
- Years of service: 1958–1961

John Henry Hannah Jr. (June 30, 1939 – December 4, 2003) from was an American lawyer, politician, and jurist who served as a United States district judge of the United States District Court for the Eastern District of Texas.

== Early life and education ==
Born in Nacogdoches County, Hannah was raised in Diboll, Texas. He received a Bachelor of Science degree from Sam Houston State University in 1966 and attended the University of Houston Law Center and the South Texas College of Law. He did not receive a law degree from either institution and received his law license through self-study.

== Career ==
Hannah served in the United States Navy from 1958 to 1961. He served as a member of the Texas House of Representatives for the fifth district from 1967 to 1973 and worked in private practice in Lufkin from 1971 to 1973. He was a district attorney in Angelina County from 1973 to 1975 and was legal counsel to Common Cause of Texas in 1975, returning to private practice in Lufkin from 1975 to 1977. He was the United States Attorney for the Eastern District of Texas from 1977 to 1981 and again worked in private practice in Lufkin from 1981 to 1991. He was a secretary of state of Texas from 1991 to 1994. He was a member of the Democratic Party.

=== Federal judicial service ===
On November 19, 1993, Hannah was nominated by President Bill Clinton to a new seat on the United States District Court for the Eastern District of Texas created by 104 Stat. 5089. He was confirmed by the United States Senate on March 10, 1994, and received his commission on March 11, 1994. He served as chief judge from 2001 to 2003.

== Personal life ==
Hannah died suddenly of a heart attack on December 4, 2003, while attending a judicial conference in West Palm Beach, Florida. His wife, United States Magistrate Judith Guthrie was with him when he died.

== Sources ==
Legal offices
Preceded by Seat established by 104 Stat. 5089	Judge of the United States District Court for the Eastern District of Texas; 1994–2003	Succeeded by Michael H. Schneider Sr.
Preceded by Richard A. Schell	Chief Judge of the United States District Court for the Eastern District of Texas; 2001–2003	Succeeded by Thad Heartfield
