= Joseph Jefferson Fisher =

American judge (1910–2000)

Senior Judge of the United States District Court for the Eastern District of Texas
- In office January 30, 1984 – June 19, 2000

Chief Judge of the United States District Court for the Eastern District of Texas
- In office 1967–1980
- Preceded by: Joseph Warren Sheehy
- Succeeded by: William Wayne Justice

Judge of the United States District Court for the Eastern District of Texas
- In office September 10, 1959 – January 30, 1984
- Appointed by: Dwight D. Eisenhower
- Preceded by: Lamar John Ryan Cecil
- Succeeded by: Sam B. Hall Jr.

Personal details
- Born: Joseph Jefferson Fisher; April 16, 1910 Bland Lake, Texas, U.S.
- Died: June 19, 2000 (aged 90) Beaumont, Texas, U.S.
- Education: University of Texas School of Law (LL.B.)

Joseph Jefferson Fisher (April 16, 1910 – June 19, 2000) was a United States district judge of the United States District Court for the Eastern District of Texas.

== Education and career ==
Born in Bland Lake, San Augustine County, Texas, Fisher received a Bachelor of Laws from the University of Texas School of Law in 1936. He was county attorney of San Augustine County from 1937 to 1939, and then district attorney of the First Judicial District of Texas from 1939 to 1946. He was in private practice in Jasper, Texas from 1946 to 1957. He was a Judge of the First Judicial District of Texas from 1957 to 1959.

== Federal judicial service ==
On September 7, 1959, Fisher was nominated by President Dwight D. Eisenhower to a seat on the United States District Court for the Eastern District of Texas vacated by Judge Lamar John Ryan Cecil. Fisher was confirmed by the United States Senate on September 9, 1959, and received his commission on September 10, 1959. He served as Chief Judge from 1967 to 1980. He assumed senior status on January 30, 1984, and served in that capacity until his death on June 19, 2000, in Beaumont, Texas.

== Sources ==
Legal offices
Preceded by Lamar John Ryan Cecil	Judge of the United States District Court for the Eastern District of Texas; 1959–1984	Succeeded by Sam B. Hall Jr.
Preceded by Joseph Warren Sheehy	Chief Judge of the United States District Court for the Eastern District of Texas; 1967–1980	Succeeded by William Wayne Justice
