= Amos Mazzant =

American judge (born 1965)

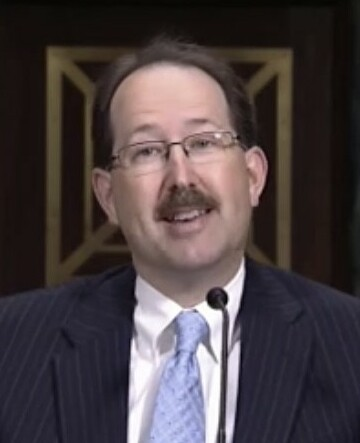
- Mazzant in 2014

Chief Judge of the United States District Court for the Eastern District of Texas
- Incumbent
- Assumed office March 1, 2025
- Preceded by: J. Rodney Gilstrap

Judge of the United States District Court for the Eastern District of Texas
- Incumbent
- Assumed office December 19, 2014
- Appointed by: Barack Obama
- Preceded by: T. John Ward

Personal details
- Born: Amos Louis Mazzant III; 1965 (age 60–61) Ellwood City, Pennsylvania, U.S.
- Party: Republican
- Education: University of Pittsburgh (BA); Baylor University (JD)

Amos Louis Mazzant III (born 1965) is the chief United States district judge of the United States District Court for the Eastern District of Texas and former United States magistrate judge of the same court.

== Biography ==
Mazzant was born in Ellwood City, Pennsylvania. He received a Bachelor of Arts degree, magna cum laude, in 1987 from the University of Pittsburgh. He received a Juris Doctor in 1990 from the Baylor Law School.

Mazzant began his legal career as a law clerk for Judge Paul Neeley Brown of the United States District Court for the Eastern District of Texas from 1990 to 1992. From 1992 to 1993, he worked at the law firm of Henderson, Bryant & Wolfe. He served as a law clerk to Magistrate Judge Robert Faulkner from 1993 to 2003 and Magistrate Judge Don D. Bush in 2003, both in the Eastern District of Texas. From 2003 to 2004, he was of counsel at Wolfe, Tidwell & McCoy, LLP. He served as a justice of the Court of Appeals for the Fifth District of Texas at Dallas, from 2004 to 2009. From 2009 to 2014, he served as a United States magistrate judge in the Eastern District of Texas.

=== Federal judicial service ===
In 2014, Mazzant was recommended to the Obama Administration as a judicial nominee by U.S. Senator Ted Cruz. On June 26, 2014, President Barack Obama nominated Mazzant to serve as a United States District Judge of the United States District Court for the Eastern District of Texas, to the seat vacated by Judge T. John Ward, who retired on October 1, 2011. His nomination was part of a bipartisan package of nominees which included Robert Pitman and Robert W. Schroeder III. He received a hearing before the United States Senate Committee on the Judiciary for September 9, 2014. On November 20, 2014 his nomination was reported out of committee by voice vote. On December 13, 2014 Senate Majority Leader Harry Reid filed a motion to invoke cloture on the nomination. On December 16, 2014, Reid withdrew his cloture motion on Mazzant's nomination, and the Senate confirmed Mazzant by voice vote. He received his federal judicial commission on December 19, 2014. He became the chief judge in 2025.

Mazzant had been mentioned as someone that President Donald Trump could nominate to the United States Court of Appeals for the Federal Circuit—his docket as a district court judge has been patent-heavy, and he is a conservative, despite having been nominated by President Obama.

=== Notable cases ===
On October 7, 2016, Mazzant conditionally dismissed securities fraud charges filed by the United States Securities and Exchange Commission against Texas Attorney General Ken Paxton.

On November 22, 2016, Mazzant issued a nationwide injunction blocking a regulation by President Barack Obama attempting to adjust the maximum salary where overtime is required, which had not been raised in decades.

In 2016, a class action lawsuit was filed against Adeptus Health (as well as members of the Company’s board of directors, Sterling Partners, and the joint book-running managers in the Company’s secondary public offering of shares of its Class A common stock) by purchasers of its securities alleging that the company violated the federal securities laws and made false and/or misleading statements, failing to disclose its internal control over financial reporting and the overall status of its business operations. The case is Oklahoma Law Enforcement Retirement System v. Adeptus Health Inc., before Judge Mazzant, and is under Sections 11, 12(a)(2), and 15 of the Securities Act of 1933, as well as Section 10(b) and 20(a) of the Securities Exchange Act of 1934.

September 8, 2017, Mazzant granted the NFLPA’s request for a temporary restraining order or preliminary injunction barring the NFL from imposing a six-game suspension on Dallas Cowboys running back Ezekiel Elliott. Mazzant found Elliott had not received a “fundamentally fair arbitration hearing”.

In February 2023, Mazzant was assigned Michael Irvin’s case against Marriott. Irvin filed a $100 million defamation lawsuit after Marriott decided not to share video requested by Irvin in his case against a female employee who claimed he was inappropriate with her during Super Bowl LVII week.

On December 3, 2024, Mazzant nationally enjoined the Corporate Transparency Act and its reporting requirements.

Legal offices
Preceded by T. John Ward	Judge of the United States District Court for the Eastern District of Texas; 2014–present	Incumbent
Preceded by J. Rodney Gilstrap	Chief Judge of the United States District Court for the Eastern District of Texas; 2025–present	Incumbent
