= Sam B. Hall Jr. =

American judge

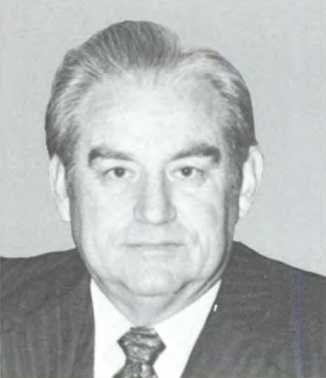

Judge of the United States District Court for the Eastern District of Texas
- In office May 10, 1985 – April 10, 1994
- Appointed by: Ronald Reagan
- Preceded by: Joseph Jefferson Fisher
- Succeeded by: David Folsom

Member of the U.S. House of Representatives from Texas's 1st district
- In office June 19, 1976 – May 27, 1985
- Preceded by: Wright Patman
- Succeeded by: Jim Chapman

Personal details
- Born: Samuel Blakeley Hall Jr. January 11, 1924 Marshall, Texas, U.S.
- Died: April 10, 1994 (aged 70) Marshall, Texas, U.S.
- Party: Democratic
- Education: College of Marshall (AA); Baylor Law School (LLB)

Samuel Blakeley Hall Jr. (January 11, 1924 – April 10, 1994) was an American lawyer, politician, and judge. He was a member of the United States House of Representatives from Texas's 1st congressional district from 1976 to 1985 and a United States district judge of the United States District Court for the Eastern District of Texas from 1985 until his death in 1994.

== Education and career ==
Born and raised in Marshall, Texas, Hall attended the College of Marshall where he met his future wife Mary Madeleine Segal. After graduating from the College of Marshall with an Associate of Arts degree in 1942, he attended the University of Texas before enlisting in the United States Army Air Corps to serve during World War II. On returning to Marshall after World War II, he married Mary Madeleine Segal and graduated from Baylor University in 1946. He received a Bachelor of Laws from Baylor Law School in 1948. After being admitted to the bar he returned to Marshall to practice law, where he was in private practice from 1948 to 1976.

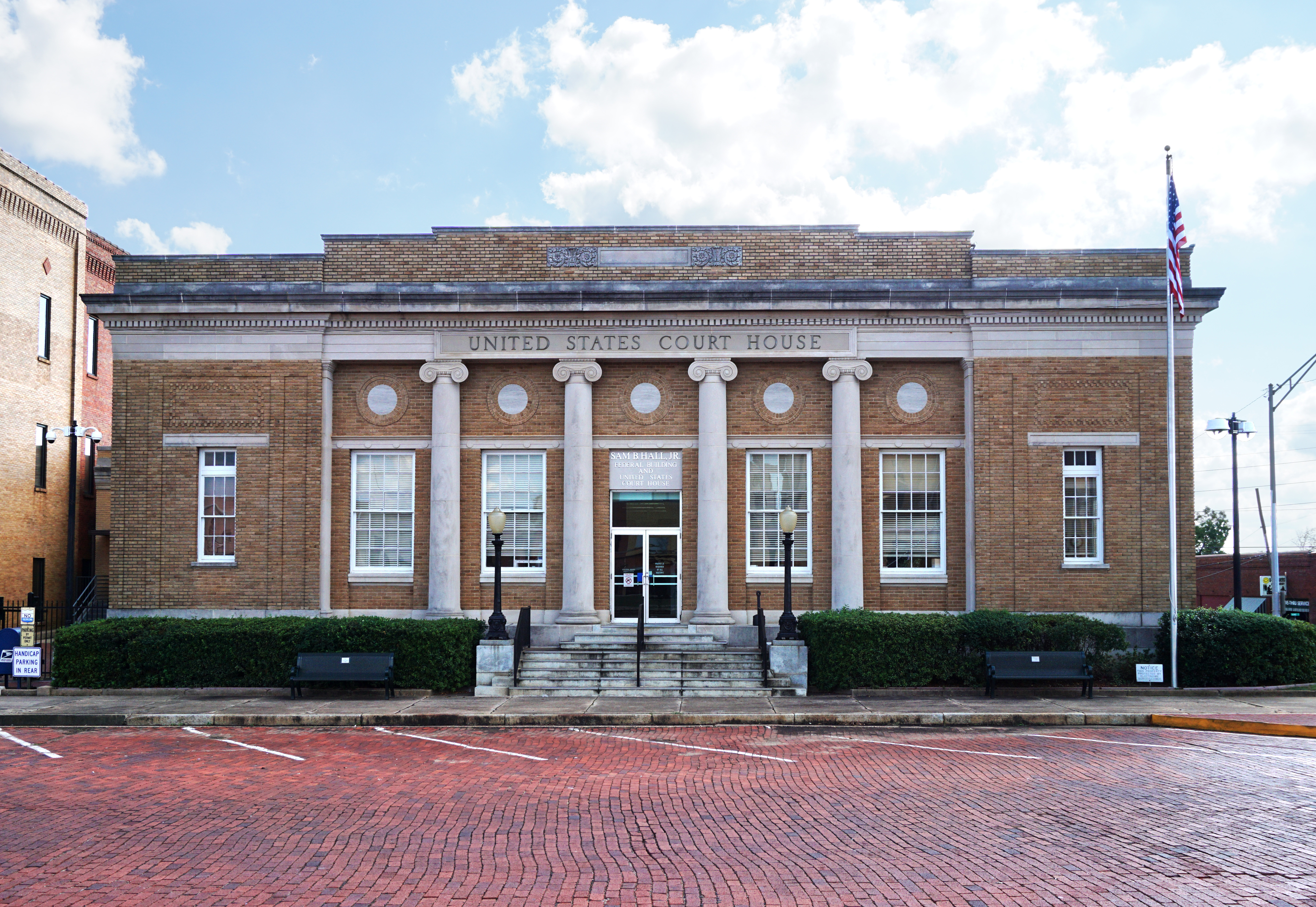
The Sam B. Hall Jr. U.S. Courthouse on Whetstone Square in Marshall, Texas. The building was originally constructed in the 1920s as a Post Office, but the Post Office moved to a newer facility in the 1960s.

== Political career ==
Hall was unsuccessful in an attempt to receive the Democratic Party nomination for Congress in the 1st district in 1962. He served as chairman of Marshall's board of education from 1972 to 1976.

In 1976, Hall won a special election for the U.S. House after the death of incumbent Wright Patman. He was reelected five times and served on the Judiciary and Veterans' Affairs committees.

== Federal judicial service ==
On April 17, 1985, Hall was nominated by President Ronald Reagan to a seat on the United States District Court for the Eastern District of Texas vacated by Judge Joseph Jefferson Fisher. The move was engineered by Republican Senator Phil Gramm as a way to demonstrate southern support for Reagan's administration—with many conservative Democratic areas of the southern states trending towards Republicans, Gramm and other observers assumed a Republican would win Hall's seat in a special election. Hall was quickly confirmed by the United States Senate on May 3, 1985, and subsequently resigned his seat in Congress to be sworn in as judge, receiving his commission on May 10, 1985. (Gramm's ploy to have Hall succeeded by a Republican failed when the special election was won by Democrat Jim Chapman, who defeated Republican Edd Hargett. ) Hall served on the bench until his death in Marshall on April 10, 1994. He was buried at New Grover Cemetery in Marshall.

== Honor ==
The Sam B. Hall Federal Courthouse in Marshall was later renamed in his honor. In 2005 Dr. Jerry L. Summers and East Texas Baptist University presented a book biography of Judge Hall, Sam B. Hall, Jr: Whatever is Right.

== Sources ==
- United States Congress. "Sam B. Hall Jr. (id: H000070)". Biographical Directory of the United States Congress.
- Appearances on C-SPAN

U.S. House of Representatives
Preceded by Wright Patman	Member of the U.S. House of Representatives from Texas's 1st congressional district 1976–1985	Succeeded by Jim Chapman
Legal offices
Preceded by Joseph Jefferson Fisher	Judge of the United States District Court for the Eastern District of Texas; 1985–1994	Succeeded by David Folsom
