= Roy S. Payne =

American judge

U.S. Magistrate Judge of the United States District Court for the Eastern District of Texas
- Incumbent
- Assumed office December 28, 2011
- Preceded by: Charles Everingham

Personal details
- Born: New Orleans, Louisiana, U.S.
- Education: University of Virginia (BA); Louisiana State University Law School (JD); Harvard Law School (LLM)

Roy Steven Payne is currently a U.S. magistrate judge of the United States District Court for the Eastern District of Texas. He previously served as a U.S. magistrate judge in the United States District Court for the Western District of Louisiana from 1987 to 2005.

== Education ==
Judge Payne was born in New Orleans, Louisiana, received his undergraduate degree from the University of Virginia (with distinction) in 1974 and obtained his Juris Doctor degree from Louisiana State University Law School in 1977, where he graduated Order of the Coif with Phi Kappa Phi honors and also served as an Associate Editor on the Louisiana Law Review from 1976 to 1977, and where he published the Note Due Process for Drivers under the Louisiana Revocation Statutes, 36 La. L. Rev. 852 (1976) and later the article The Coconspirators’ Exception to the Hearsay Rule: The Limits of Its Logic, 37 La. L. Rev. 1101 (1977). Judge Payne also obtained his Master of Laws (LL.M.) degree from Harvard Law School in 1980.

== Career ==
Judge Payne previously served as a judicial law clerk to the Honorable Tom Stagg, U.S. District Judge for the United States District Court for the Western District of Louisiana from 1977 to 1979. He also was an instructor at the New England School of Law from 1979 to 1980. Payne practiced with the law firm of Blanchard, Walker, O’Quin & Roberts in Shreveport, Louisiana in the areas of insurance defense, products liability, tort law and commercial litigation from 1980 to 1987.

In 1987, Judge Payne was appointed as a U.S. magistrate judge for the United States District Court for the Western District of Louisiana (based in Shreveport) and served in that position for 18 years, from 1987 to 2005.

From 2005 to 2011, Payne was a partner with the law firm of Gregorio, Gregory & Payne in Shreveport, primarily representing plaintiffs in personal injury actions and commercial litigation. Payne further served as the Chairman of Northwest Louisiana Legal Services from 1985 to 1986, was the President of the Harry V. Booth American Inn of Court from 1996 to 1998, was a member of the Hearing Committee for the Louisiana Attorney Disciplinary Board in 2008, served as the Vice President of the Shreveport Bar Association in 2008 and the President Elect of the same organization in 2009.

On December 28, 2011, Judge Payne was sworn in as U.S. magistrate judge for the United States District Court for the Eastern District of Texas in Marshall, replacing previous U.S. magistrate judge Charles Everingham, and selected out of over 55 candidates for the position.

== Patent Law Expertise ==
=== Markman hearings ===
According to Docket Navigator, Judge Payne has construed a significantly high number of patent claim terms (over 10,000 terms as of 2025), and the number of claim terms he has construed before has been ranked the highest of all time compared to other judges in past polls or rankings. Also, according to Lex Machina, Docket Navigator and research done by patent law scholars, Judge Payne ranks among the top five federal judges, either Magistrate or District, who have conducted the most Markman hearings (aka claim construction hearings) of all time.

=== Patent litigation ===
Also, Judge Payne is the U.S. magistrate judge that has had the most patent cases filed before him: for example, in 2017, Judge Payne had 327 new patent cases filed before him, which is the highest number for any U.S. magistrate judge, and second among all federal judges, District or Magistrate, the first being U.S. District Judge J. Rodney Gilstrap of the same U.S. District Court for the Eastern District of Texas courthouse in Marshall, Texas, with 550 cases. In 2016, Judge Payne had 767 new patent cases filed before him, which was also the highest number for any U.S. magistrate judge, and second among all federal judges, the first again being Judge Gilstrap. Moreover, in 2015, more than 25% of the nation's patent cases were filed before Judge Payne and/or also Judge Gilstrap in the Marshall, Texas division of the U.S. District Court for the Eastern District of Texas. In 2014-2015, Judge Payne was ranked second among all federal judges (either district or magistrate judge) with the most new patent cases filed before him (2015:1074 cases; 2014:445 cases), the first ranked being Judge Gilstrap. According to Docket Navigator, in 2015 Judge Payne was ranked second as to the number of patent cases filed before him, the number of litigants, and the number of accusations, the first again being Judge Gilstrap. Similar statistics performed by Docket Navigator rank Judge Payne the second most active federal judge (either district or magistrate judge) by number of parties, the third most active federal judge by number of orders and the fifth most active federal judge by number of cases from the years of 2014 to 2008 (even though he came on the bench in 2011) for patent litigation.

== Links ==
- The Honorable Roy Payne, United States District Court for the Eastern District of Texas
- PLI Faculty Bios: Judge Roy Payne
- Michael C. Smith, New Magistrate Judge Selected for Marshall
- Robin Y. Richardson, East Texas Federal judge, Magistrate Judge, Leave Posts, Longview News-Journal
- John Council, New U.S. Magistrate Judge Selected for Eastern District's Marshall Division, Texas Lawyer, Tex Parte Blog
- LegalSpan, Faculty Bio, Roy S. Payne

== See also ==
- United States District Court for the Eastern District of Texas
- United States Court of Appeals for the Fifth Circuit
