= Marcia A. Crone =

American judge (born 1952)

Marcia Ann Cain Crone

Judge of the United States District Court for the Eastern District of Texas
- Incumbent
- Assumed office October 3, 2003
- Appointed by: George W. Bush
- Preceded by: Seat established by 116 Stat. 1758

Magistrate Judge of the United States District Court for the Southern District of Texas
- In office 1992–2003

Personal details
- Born: December 12, 1952 (age 73) Dallas, Texas, U.S.
- Education: University of Texas, Austin (BA); University of Houston (JD)

Marcia Ann Cain Crone (born December 12, 1952) is an American lawyer who serves as a United States district judge of the United States District Court for the Eastern District of Texas.

== Early life and education ==
Crone was born in 1952 in Dallas. She graduated from the University of Texas at Austin with a Bachelor of Arts degree in 1973 and from University of Houston Law Center with a Juris Doctor in 1978.

== Career ==
Crone started her legal career in private practice in Houston, Texas from 1978 to 1992. She later became a United States Magistrate Judge of the United States District Court for the Southern District of Texas in 1992 and stayed in this position until she was nominated to the federal bench in 2003.

=== Federal judicial career ===
President George W. Bush nominated Crone on May 1, 2003, to a new seat created by 116 Stat. 1758. She was confirmed by the United States Senate on September 30, 2003, and received her commission on October 3, 2003.

== Notable case ==
On October 4, 2016, Crone entered a nationwide injunction blocking President Barack Obama’s Fair Pay and Safe Workplaces rule, known to its opponents as the blacklisting rule. Judge Crone found the Due Process Clause and Free Speech Clause of the United States Constitution forbid the President from requiring federal contractors to disclose mere allegations that the contractor had violated labor laws.

== Sources ==
Legal offices
Preceded by Seat established by 116 Stat. 1758	Judge of the United States District Court for the Eastern District of Texas; 2003–present	Incumbent
