= William Steger =

American judge (1920–2006)

- AP Wirephoto of William Steger (1953)

Senior Judge of the United States District Court for the Eastern District of Texas
- In office December 31, 1987 – June 4, 2006

Judge of the United States District Court for the Eastern District of Texas
- In office December 1, 1970 – December 31, 1987
- Appointed by: Richard Nixon
- Preceded by: Seat established by 84 Stat. 294
- Succeeded by: Richard A. Schell

Personal details
- Born: William Merritt Steger; August 22, 1920 Dallas, Texas, U.S.
- Died: June 4, 2006 (aged 85) Tyler, Texas, U.S.
- Party: Republican
- Education: Dedman School of Law (LLB)

William Merritt Steger (August 22, 1920 – June 4, 2006) was an American politician and United States district judge of the United States District Court for the Eastern District of Texas.

== Education and career ==
Born on August 22, 1920, in Dallas, Texas, Steger received a Bachelor of Laws from the Dedman School of Law at Southern Methodist University in 1950. He was in the United States Army Air Forces as a Captain from 1942 to 1947. He was in private practice of law in Longview, Texas from 1951 to 1953. He was the United States Attorney for the Eastern District of Texas from 1953 to 1959. He was in private practice of law in Tyler, Texas from 1959 to 1970. He was the Republican candidate for Governor of Texas in 1960. He was a Republican candidate for United States House of Representatives from Texas in 1962. He was the Chairman of the Republican Party of Texas from 1969 to 1970.

== Federal judicial service ==
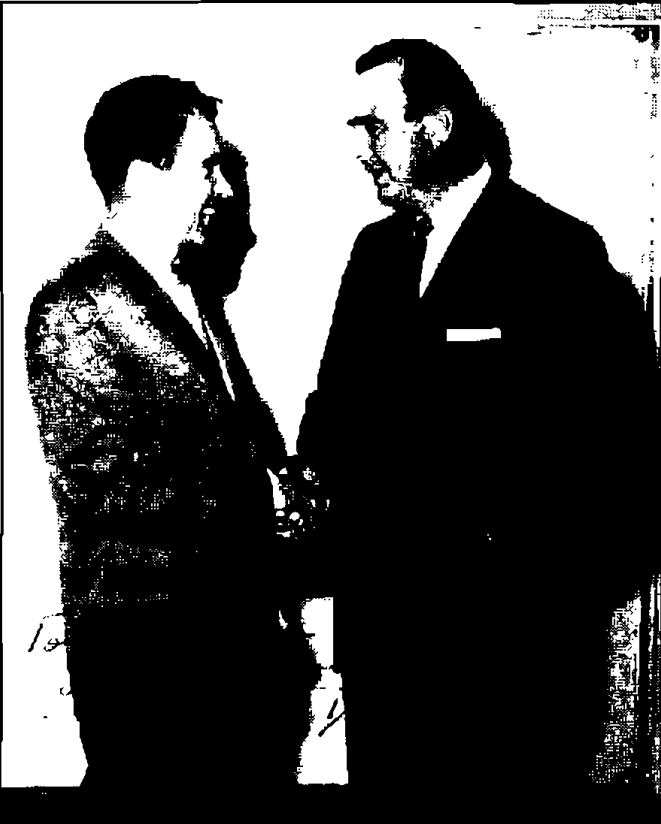
William Steger shaking hands with Republican Presidential Candidate Richard Milhous Nixon.

Steger was nominated by President Richard Nixon on October 7, 1970, to the United States District Court for the Eastern District of Texas, to a new seat created by 84 Stat. 294. He was confirmed by the United States Senate on November 25, 1970, and received his commission on December 1, 1970. He assumed senior status on December 31, 1987. His service was terminated on June 4, 2006, due to his death in Tyler.

== Honor ==
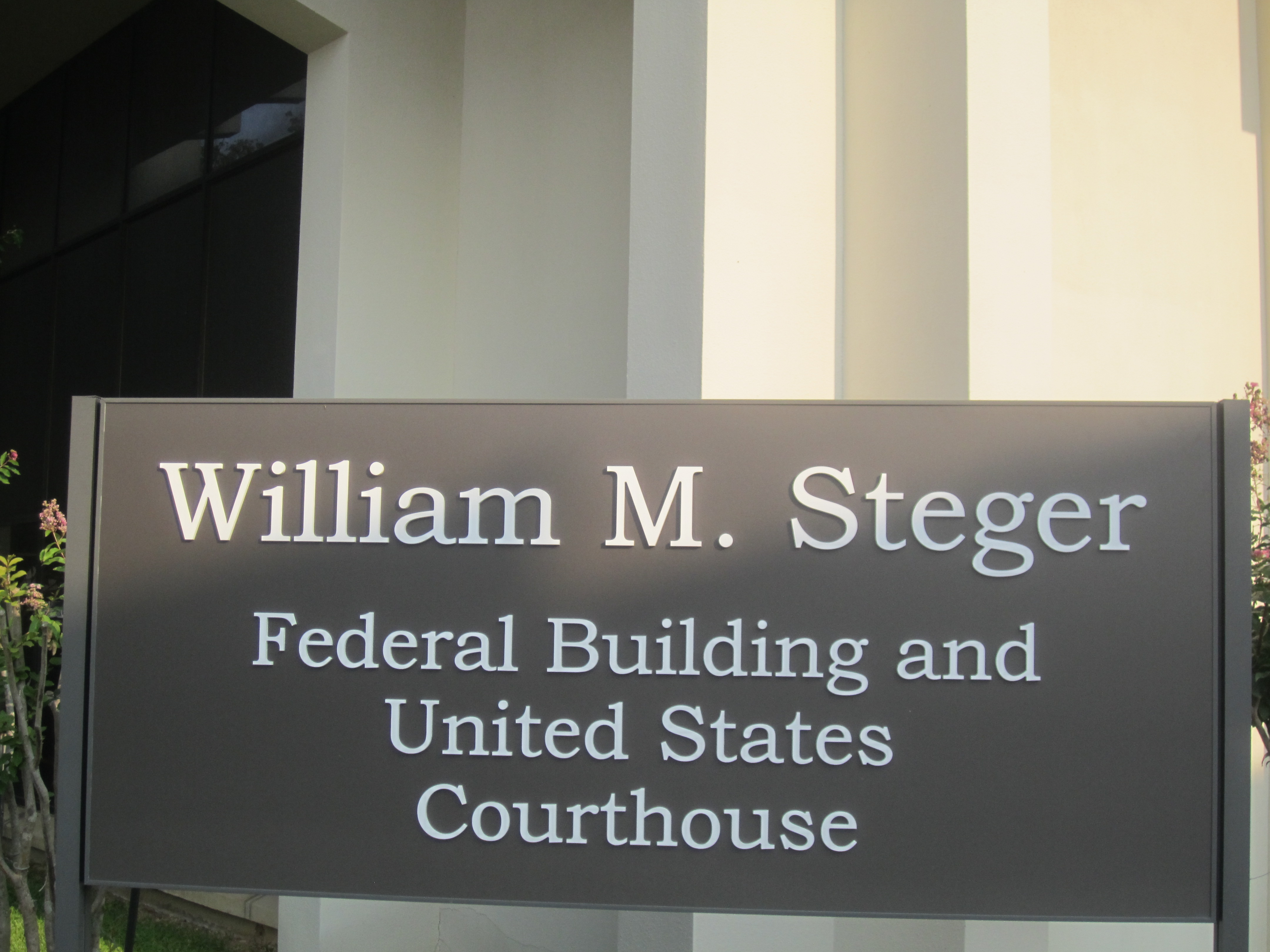
The federal building in Tyler, Texas, bears the name of former Judge William M. Steger.

The William M. Steger Federal Building and United States Courthouse was named in Steger's honor.

Party political offices
Preceded by Edwin S. Mayer	Republican nominee for Governor of Texas; 1960	Succeeded by Jack Cox
Legal offices
Preceded by Seat established by 84 Stat. 294	Judge of the United States District Court for the Eastern District of Texas; 1970–1987	Succeeded by Richard A. Schell
