= Thad Heartfield =

American judge (1940–2022)

Senior Judge of the United States District Court for the Eastern District of Texas
- In office January 1, 2010 – December 27, 2022

Chief Judge of the United States District Court for the Eastern District of Texas
- In office 2003–2009
- Preceded by: John H. Hannah, Jr.
- Succeeded by: David Folsom

Judge of the United States District Court for the Eastern District of Texas
- In office March 17, 1995 – January 1, 2010
- Appointed by: Bill Clinton
- Preceded by: Robert Manley Parker
- Succeeded by: J. Rodney Gilstrap

Personal details
- Born: September 10, 1940 Port Arthur, Texas, U.S.
- Died: December 27, 2022 (aged 82)
- Education: St. Mary's University (BA, JD)

Thad Heartfield (September 10, 1940 – December 27, 2022) was an American lawyer who served as a United States district judge of the United States District Court for the Eastern District of Texas from 1995 to 2022.

== Education and career ==
Heartfield graduated from St. Mary's University, Texas with a Bachelor of Arts degree in 1962 and received a Juris Doctor from the St. Mary's University School of Law in 1965. He served as an assistant district attorney for Jefferson County, Texas, from 1965 to 1966. He was in private practice in Beaumont, Texas, from 1966 to 1969 and from 1973 to 1995. He was the city attorney for Beaumont from 1969 to 1973. He was the Director of the Lower Neches Valley Authority of Texas from 1983 to 1994.

== Federal judicial service ==
Heartfield was nominated to a seat on the United States District Court for the Eastern District of Texas by President Bill Clinton on January 11, 1995, confirmed by the United States Senate on March 17, 1995, and received his commission on March 17, 1995. He served as chief judge from 2003 through 2009. He assumed senior status on January 1, 2010.

== Notable case ==
In 2009, Heartfield presided over Doe v. Silsbee Independent School District. The plaintiff ("H.S.") was a cheerleader who was ordered by her high school to cheer for a football and basketball player named Rakheem Bolton, who she had accused of raping her and who had pleaded guilty to assaulting her. H.S. refused and was kicked off the team. She sued, claiming a violation of her First Amendment right to free speech. Judge Heartfield granted the school district's motion to dismiss. Judge Heartfield's decision was affirmed by Judges Edith Brown Clement, Emilio M. Garza, and Priscilla Owen of the Fifth Circuit Court of Appeals. H.S. was ordered to pay the school $45,000 in legal fees for filing a "frivolous" lawsuit.

== Personal life and death ==
Heartfield died on December 27, 2022, at the age of 82.

Legal offices
Preceded by Robert Manley Parker	Judge of the United States District Court for the Eastern District of Texas; 1995–2010	Succeeded by J. Rodney Gilstrap
Preceded by John H. Hannah, Jr.	Chief Judge of the United States District Court for the Eastern District of Texas; 2003–2009	Succeeded by David Folsom
