= Lamar John Ryan Cecil =

American judge

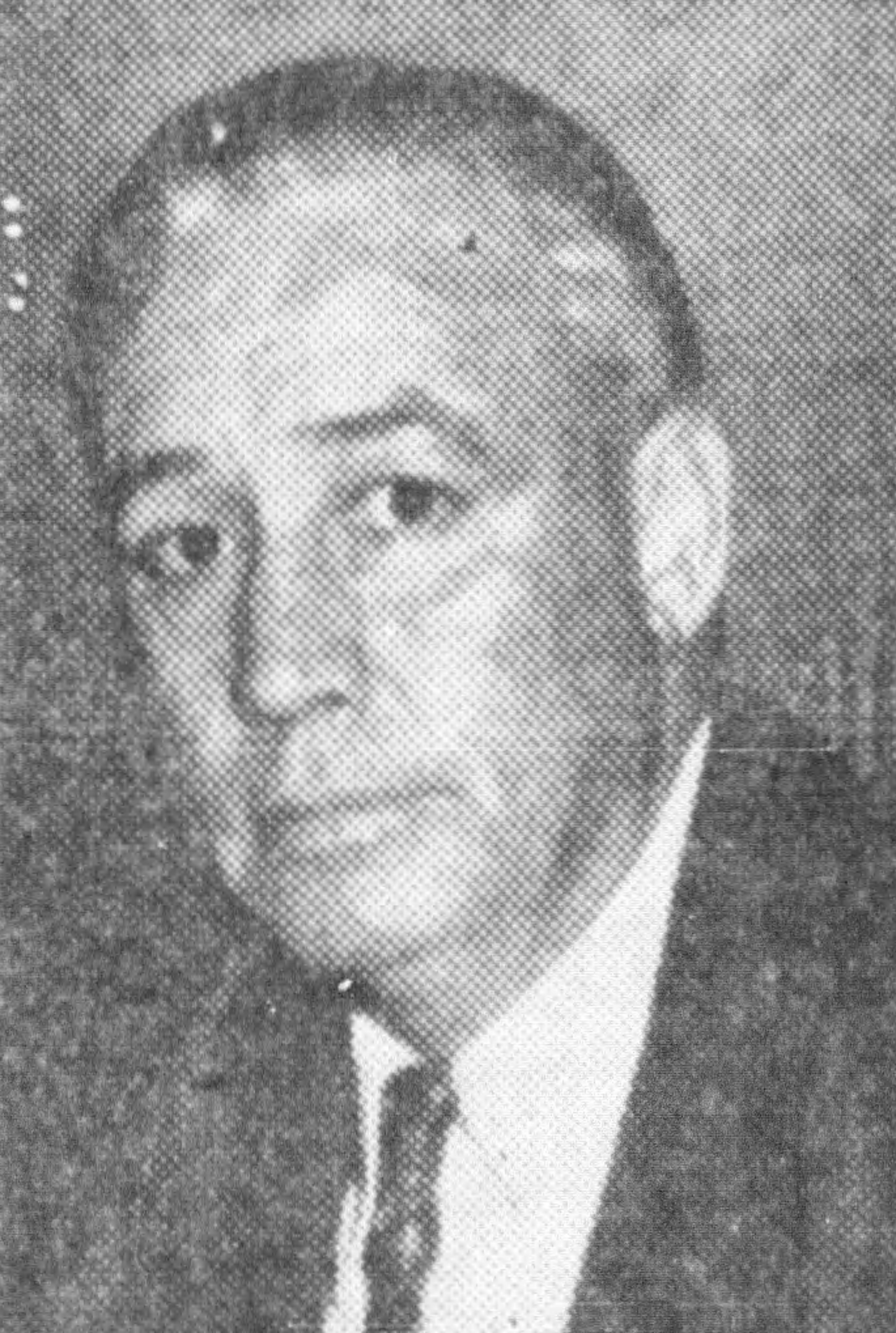

Judge of the United States District Court for the Eastern District of Texas
- In office August 31, 1954 – February 14, 1958
- Appointed by: Dwight D. Eisenhower
- Preceded by: Seat established by 68 Stat. 8
- Succeeded by: Joseph Jefferson Fisher

Personal details
- Born: Lamar John Ryan Cecil; November 2, 1902 Houston, Texas
- Died: February 14, 1958 (aged 55)
- Education: Rice University (B.A.); University of Texas School of Law (LL.B.)

Lamar John Ryan Cecil (November 2, 1902 – February 14, 1958) was a United States district judge of the United States District Court for the Eastern District of Texas.

== Education and career ==
Born in Houston, Texas, Cecil received a Bachelor of Arts degree from Rice Institute (now Rice University) in 1923 and a Bachelor of Laws from the University of Texas School of Law in 1927. He was in private practice in Beaumont, Texas from 1927 to 1954. Along with his wife Mary Reed Cecil, he became the father of historian Lamar John Ryan Cecil (1932 - 2023), who was the William R. Kenan Jr. Professor of History at Washington and Lee University, and was the author of several books on Imperial Germany including:

Albert Ballin: Business and Politics in Imperial Germany, 1888 – 1918 (1967)

The German Diplomatic Service, 1871 – 1914 (1976)

Wilhelm II: Volume 1: Prince and Emperor, 1859 – 1900 (1989)

Wilhelm II: Volume 2: Emperor and Exile, 1900 – 1941 (2000)

== Federal judicial service ==
On August 31, 1954, Cecil received a recess appointment from President Dwight D. Eisenhower to a new seat on the United States District Court for the Eastern District of Texas created by 68 Stat. 8. Formally nominated to the same seat by President Eisenhower on November 8, 1954, he was confirmed by the United States Senate on December 2, 1954, and received his commission on December 3, 1954. Cecil served in that capacity until his death on February 14, 1958.

== Sources ==
Legal offices
Preceded by Seat established by 68 Stat. 8	Judge of the United States District Court for the Eastern District of Texas; 1954–1958	Succeeded by Joseph Jefferson Fisher
