= J. Rodney Gilstrap =

American judge (born 1957)

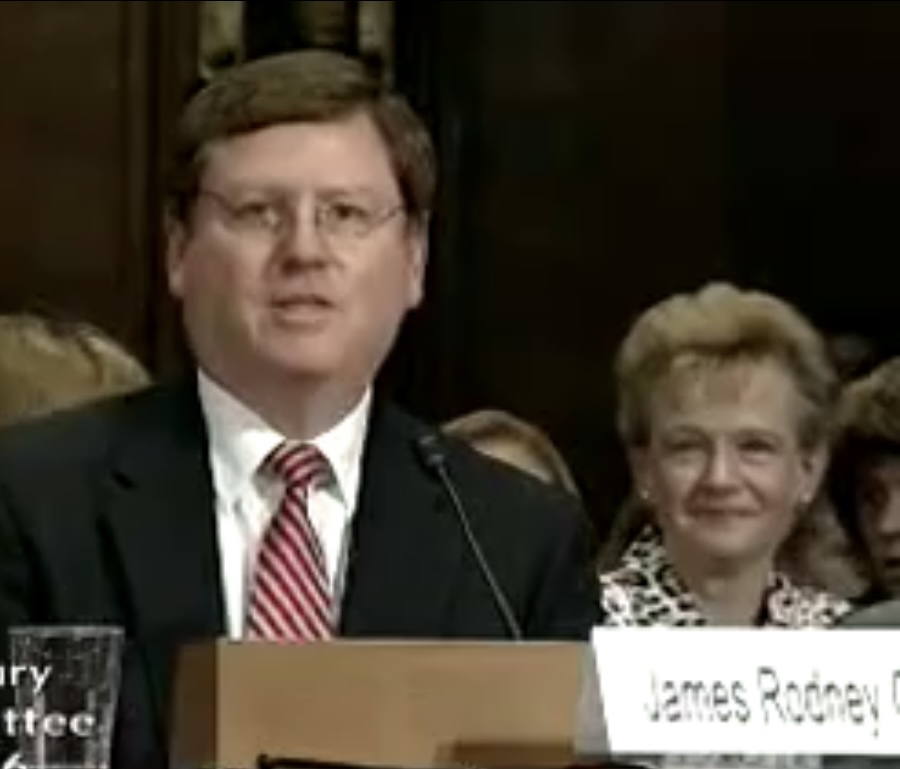
- Gilstrap in 2019

Chief Judge of the United States District Court for the Eastern District of Texas
- In office March 1, 2018 – March 1, 2025
- Preceded by: Ron Clark
- Succeeded by: Amos Mazzant

Judge of the United States District Court for the Eastern District of Texas
- Incumbent
- Assumed office December 6, 2011
- Appointed by: Barack Obama
- Preceded by: Thad Heartfield

Personal details
- Born: May 1, 1957 (age 69) Pensacola, Florida, U.S.
- Party: Democratic
- Education: Baylor University (BA, JD)

James Rodney Gilstrap (born May 1, 1957) is a United States district judge of the United States District Court for the Eastern District of Texas. He is notable for presiding over more than one quarter of all patent infringement cases filed in the nation and is often referred to by various sources as the country's single "busiest patent judge."

== Early life and education ==
Gilstrap was born in Pensacola, Florida. He is an Eagle Scout. He received a Bachelor of Arts from Baylor University in 1978, where he graduated magna cum laude. As an undergraduate he was inducted into Phi Beta Kappa. He also earned a Juris Doctor from Baylor Law School in 1981, where he was associate editor of the Baylor Law Review. While on the review, he published the article Video Recorders: Copyright Infringement, 33 Baylor Law Review 695 (1981). Gilstrap later served as president of the Baylor Law Alumni Association.

== Career ==
After graduation from law school, Gilstrap entered private practice in the town of Marshall, Texas as an Associate with the firm of Abney, Baldwin & Searcy from 1981 to 1984. He later became a founding Partner of Smith & Gilstrap in Marshall from 1984 to 1989, where his practice covered oil and gas, real estate, probate law and occasionally patent cases. Among the patent cases Gilstrap worked on while at Smith & Gilstrap included defending Capital One Financial Corporation in a patent suit brought by LML Patent Corporation alleging patent infringement by several banks on patents covering payment services and the representation of a company called Bluestone Innovations Texas in a patent infringement suit brought against a number of foreign companies involving Light-emitting diodes (or LED) technology. Gilstrap served as a Harrison County Judge from 1989 to 2002. Gilstrap also served 16 years on the Courthouse Preservation Council in Marshall, and also served as the Chair of the Unauthorized Practice of Law Committee with the State Bar of Texas. In 2004, Gilstrap co-authored an article with Leland de la Garza which appeared in the Texas Bar Journal: UPL: Unlicensed, Unwanted and Unwelcome 67 Texas Bar Journal 798 (2004). While and after serving as a Harrison County Judge, Gilstrap was practicing at Smith & Gilstrap until he became appointed to the federal bench in 2011.

=== Federal judicial service ===
On May 19, 2011, President Barack Obama nominated Gilstrap to a seat on United States District Court for the Eastern District of Texas. Gilstrap was rated as Unanimously Qualified by the American Bar Association and had a hearing before the Senate Judiciary Committee on July 28, 2011. On September 15, 2011, the Senate Judiciary Committee reported his nomination to the Senate floor by voice vote. The Senate confirmed his nomination by voice vote on December 5, 2011. He received his commission on December 6, 2011. He became the chief judge on March 1, 2018, after Ron Clark assumed senior status.

== Patent law experience ==
=== The busiest patent judge in the country ===
According to Lex Machina and other sources, Gilstrap is the United States district judge that hears the most patent cases in the country and has been referred to by many sources as the nation's single "busiest patent judge". In 2016, for example, 1,119 cases were brought before Gilstrap, who saw more new cases than the next 10 highest ranking judges – 2016 was also the fourth year in a row where Gilstrap had more patent cases than any other federal judge. In 2015, over 28% of the nation's patent cases were filed before him. Gilstrap and United States Magistrate Judge Roy S. Payne, who are the only two judges based out of the Marshall division of the United States District Court for the Eastern District of Texas, also have the most patent cases filed before them out of the predominant share of the nation's patent cases that are filed in the Eastern District of Texas. In 2023–24, Chief Judge Gilstrap regained the title of top patent judge with the most patent cases filed before him.

From 2014 to 2015, Gilstrap was ranked first amongst all federal judges (either United States district judge or United States magistrate judge) with the most patent cases filed before him. According to Docket Navigator, in 2015 Gilstrap was also ranked first as to the single federal judge having to preside over the highest number of filed cases, the highest number of litigants, and the highest number of accusations. Also according to Docket Navigator, Gilstrap is the top ranked (#1) most active federal judge (either district or magistrate judge) by number of parties, number of orders and by number of cases from the years of 2014 to 2008 (even though he came on the bench in 2011) for patent litigation.

=== Notable patent decisions ===
- In 2013, Gilstrap presided over the case of TQP Development v. Newegg where the jury ordered Newegg to pay $2.3 million for infringing four asserted claims in a patent involving modem technologies and Internet security systems such as SSL or TLS together with the RC4 Cipher. However, in 2015, Gilstrap ruled that Newegg did not infringe TQP Development's patent, effectively overturning the verdict.
- In 2015, Gilstrap ruled that a $533 million jury verdict (the largest ever for a patent assertion entity, Smartflash) in Smartflash, Inc. v. Apple be thrown out due to a faulty jury instruction, and ordered a new trial solely on the issue of damages.
- Also in 2015, Gilstrap denied a request by ZTE Corporation for a new trial after a jury found that it infringed two patents owned by DataQuill covering data entry technology and awarded DataQuill $31.5 million.
- In 2015, Gilstrap ordered 35 U.S.C. 285 "exceptional case" fees to be levied against a notorious non-practicing entity (the worst of them known as patent trolls), eDekka LLC. He ruled that the case was "objectively unreasonable" after previously invalidating eDekka's patent under the U.S. Supreme Court case of Alice v. CLS Bank International.
- In 2016, Gilstrap enhanced damages based on a jury verdict that LG willfully infringed two standard essential patents (SEPs) owned by Core Wireless covering cellular standards. He previously denied LG's motion for summary judgement that the SEPs were not willfully infringed, letting that issue go to the jury.
- In 2017, Gilstrap levied sanctions against patent assertion entity Iris Connex, which had a patent covering phone technology used to take "selfies". In his order, Gilstrap mentioned that due to the misconduct of the parties, this was "the clearest example of an exceptional case to yet come before" him.
- In June 2017, Gilstrap provided a four-part test in determining venue after the U.S. Supreme Court case of TC Heartland LLC v. Kraft Foods Group Brands LLC in the case of Raytheon v. Cray, but in September 2017 was overturned by the Court of Appeals for the Federal Circuit in response to a petition for writ of mandamus by Cray. However, the appellate decision commended Gilstrap's decision as thorough, and adopted several of its arguments as instructive for future cases.
- In September 2019, Gilstrap presided over the first trial on patent-eligible subject matter in the history of the United States. Gilstrap previously denied a motion for summary judgment that the asserted patents—banking patents directed to the electronic transmission of check images—were invalid under 35 U.S.C. § 101. PPS Data, LLC v. Jack Henry & Assocs., Inc., 404 F. Supp. 3d 1021 (E.D. Tex. 2019). In denying the defendant's motion for summary judgment, Gilstrap set forth a novel burden-shifting framework for determining claim representativeness in the context of invalidity defenses. Because each claim is presumed independently valid, Gilstrap held that the defendant must demonstrate "that there are no legally relevant distinctions between the claim identified as representative and the remaining asserted claims." Id. at 1030–31 (citing Solutran, Inc. v. Elavon, Inc., 931 F.3d 1161, 1168 (Fed. Cir. 2019)). Gilstrap's representativeness framework was received positively by commentators, and has been adopted by other judges in the Eastern District of Texas as well as judges in the District of Delaware. See NICE Ltd. v. CallMiner, Inc., Case No. 1:18-cv-02024-RGA-SFA (D. Del. February 3, 2020). Following the denial of the motion for summary judgment and a week-long trial, the jury found by clear and convincing evidence that the asserted patent was invalid for being directed to patent-ineligible subject matter.

=== Notable non-patent decisions ===
- In February 2020, Gilstrap determined that tobacco manufacturer R.J. Reynolds Tobacco Company must continue making its full portion of an $8 billion annual payment to the State of Texas pursuant to a 1998 Settlement Agreement. In 1996, Texas brought historic litigation against all major tobacco manufacturers, including Reynolds, asserting that their products injured both Texas citizens and Texas itself, which had to expend money on healthcare for citizens who suffer from tobacco-related illnesses.
- On the eve of trial in 1998, in exchange for a perpetual release of liability for all claims, Reynolds promised to make an annual payment in perpetuity to compensate Texas for its healthcare costs. However, in 2015, Reynolds sold off several major brands which were subject to the 1998 Settlement Agreement and argued that its sale of the brands extinguished its liability under the settlement. The purchaser of the brands, Imperial Tobacco Group LLC, also denied that it was liable for payments on the brands. Texas argued that a party cannot unilaterally extinguish its contract obligations via an assignment of the contract's subject matter—otherwise, reimbursement for the billions of cigarettes sold every year under the brands would "go up in smoke," to the detriment of the Texas citizenry.
- Gilstrap agreed with Texas, and held that Reynolds remained liable for its full portion of the $8 billion annual payment to Texas. "Reynolds accepted a perpetual release in return for agreeing to make perpetual payments. Nothing that has intervened since then has lessened that obligation. Reynolds remains as liable today as it was when it entered into the Texas Settlement in 1998." Texas v. American Tobacco Co., Case No. 5:96-cv-91-JRG (E.D. Tex. February 25, 2020). Reynolds initially appealed Gilstrap's decision, but subsequently dismissed its appeal.

=== Recusal controversy ===
October 2021 reporting by The Wall Street Journal revealed that since 2011, Gilstrap had presided over 138 cases in which a familial financial conflicts of interest allegedly required his recusal. The paper's investigation revealed he held the national record for number of cases in which a federal judge did not recuse himself owing to an alleged familial financial conflict of interest. However, the investigation also noted that Gilstrap had not taken any action (and certainly not any biased action) because virtually all of the cases at issue were settled by agreement of the parties, prior to the defendant filing an answer and prior to the Court making any ruling on the merits. Notably, Gilstrap did not have a direct financial conflict in any of the cases—instead, the alleged conflict stemmed from the fact that Gilstrap's spouse was the beneficiary of a third-party trust which neither Gilstrap nor his spouse controlled, which had invested in portfolios that included certain stocks. For the avoidance of even any appearance of a conflict, the trust promptly divested the stocks at issue immediately after the alleged conflicts came to light. The paper's investigation does not identify any conflict following the divestiture.

Legal offices
Preceded by Thad Heartfield	Judge of the United States District Court for the Eastern District of Texas; 2011–present	Incumbent
Preceded by Ron Clark	Chief Judge of the United States District Court for the Eastern District of Texas; 2018–2025	Succeeded by Amos Mazzant
