= Richard A. Schell =

American judge (born 1950)

Richard Alexander Schell

Senior Judge of the United States District Court for the Eastern District of Texas
- Incumbent
- Assumed office March 10, 2015

Chief Judge of the United States District Court for the Eastern District of Texas
- In office 1994–2001
- Preceded by: Robert Manley Parker
- Succeeded by: John H. Hannah Jr.

Judge of the United States District Court for the Eastern District of Texas
- In office June 6, 1988 – March 10, 2015
- Appointed by: Ronald Reagan
- Preceded by: William Steger
- Succeeded by: Sean D. Jordan

Personal details
- Born: Richard Alexander Schell; 1950 (age 75–76) Dallas, Texas, U.S.
- Education: Southern Methodist University (BA, JD)

Richard Alexander Schell (born 1950) is a senior United States district judge of the United States District Court for the Eastern District of Texas.

== Education and career ==
Schell was born in Dallas. He received a Bachelor of Arts degree from Southern Methodist University in 1972 and a Juris Doctor from the Dedman School of Law at Southern Methodist University in 1975. He was an instructor at the Dedman School of Law from 1975 to 1976. He was an assistant district attorney of Collin County, Texas in 1976. He was in private practice in McKinney, Texas from 1977 to 1982. He was a Judge of the County Court at Law in Collin County from 1982 to 1986. He was a Judge of the 219th Judicial District Court of Texas from 1986 to 1988.

=== Federal judicial service ===
On April 13, 1988, Schell was nominated by President Ronald Reagan to a seat on the United States District Court for the Eastern District of Texas vacated by Judge William Steger. Schell was confirmed by the United States Senate on May 27, 1988, and received his commission on June 6, 1988. He served as Chief Judge from 1994 to 2001. He took senior status on March 10, 2015. Schell took inactive senior status on June 13, 2023.

== Sources ==
Legal offices
Preceded by William Steger	Judge of the United States District Court for the Eastern District of Texas; 1988–2015	Succeeded by Sean D. Jordan
Preceded by Robert Manley Parker	Chief Judge of the United States District Court for the Eastern District of Texas; 1994–2001	Succeeded by John H. Hannah Jr.
