= United States District Court for the Eastern District of Texas =

United States federal district court in Texas

Coordinates: 32.352020°N 95.302563°W

- (E.D. Tex.)
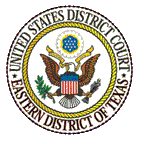
- Location: William M. Steger Federal Building and U.S. Courthouse (Tyler) More locations: Jack Brooks Federal Building (Beaumont); Lufkin; Sam B. Hall Jr. Federal Building and U.S. Courthouse (Marshall); Paul Brown Federal Building and U.S. Courthouse (Sherman); Plano; United States Post Office and Courthouse (Texarkana)
- Appeals to: Fifth Circuit
- Established: February 21, 1857
- Judges: 8
- Chief Judge: Amos Mazzant

Officers of the court
- U.S. Attorney: Jay R. Combs (acting)
- U.S. Marshal: John M. Garrison
- www.txed.uscourts.gov

The United States District Court for the Eastern District of Texas (in case citations, E.D. Tex.) is a federal court in the Fifth Circuit (except for patent claims and claims against the U.S. government under the Tucker Act, which are appealed to the Federal Circuit).

The district was established on February 21, 1857, with the division of the state into an Eastern and Western District.

== Organization of the court ==
The United States District Court for the Eastern District of Texas is one of four federal judicial districts in Texas. Court for the district is held at Beaumont, Lufkin, Marshall, Plano, Sherman, Texarkana, and Tyler.

Beaumont Division comprises the following counties: Hardin, Jasper, Jefferson, Liberty, Newton, and Orange.

Lufkin Division comprises the following counties: Angelina, Houston, Nacogdoches, Polk, Sabine, San Augustine, Shelby, Trinity, and Tyler.

Marshall Division comprises the following counties: Camp, Cass, Harrison, Marion, Morris, and Upshur.

Sherman Division comprises the following counties: Collin, Cooke, Delta, Denton, Fannin, Grayson, Hopkins, and Lamar at the Paul Brown Courthouse

Texarkana Division comprises the following counties: Bowie, Franklin, Red River, and Titus.

Tyler Division comprises the following counties: Anderson, Cherokee, Gregg, Henderson, Panola, Rains, Rusk, Smith, Van Zandt, and Wood.

The United States Attorney's Office for the Eastern District of Texas represents the United States in civil and criminal litigation in the court. As of May 29, 2025, the acting United States attorney is Jay R. Combs.

== History ==
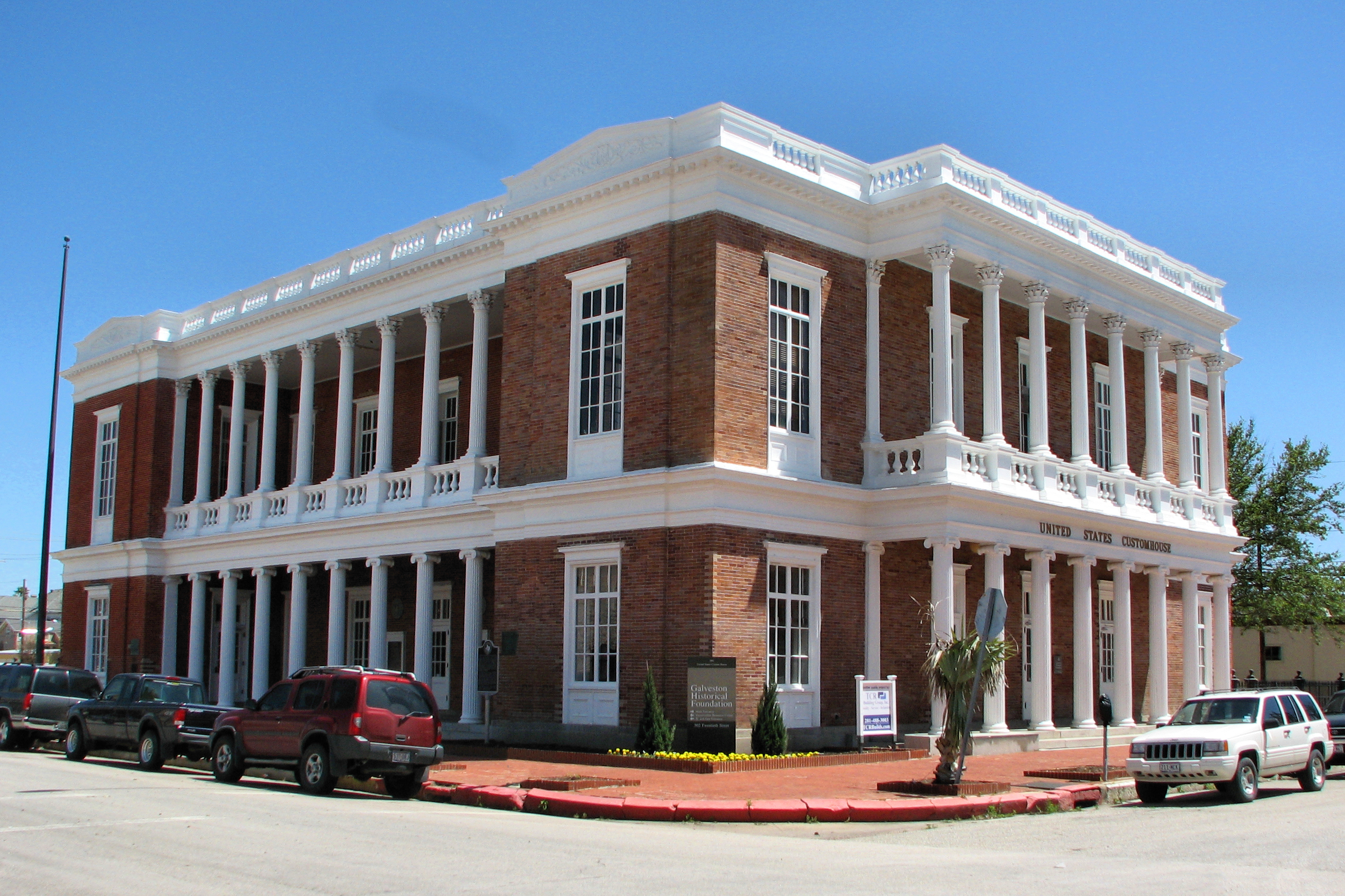
The oldest federal civil building in Texas, the 1861 Customs and Courthouse in Galveston, housed headquarters for the Eastern District of Texas between 1861–1891.

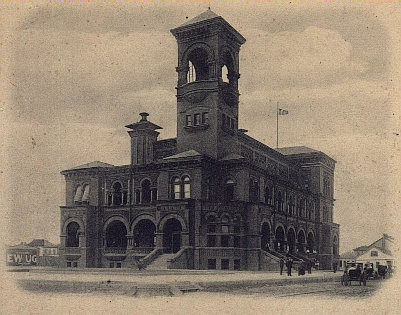
Federal courthouse in Galveston that housed the Eastern District court from 1891–1902, when the Southern District of Texas was created.

The first federal judge in Texas was John C. Watrous, who was appointed on May 26, 1846, and had previously served as Attorney General of the Republic of Texas. He was assigned to hold court in Galveston, at the time, the largest city in the state. As seat of the Texas Judicial District, the Galveston court had jurisdiction over the whole state.

== Patent litigation ==
The Eastern District of Texas currently hears the most patent cases in the country and has seen an increase in the number of cases filed relating to patent infringement, notably in the courts of Judge T. John Ward in the Marshall Division, Judge Leonard Davis in the Tyler Division, and Judge David Folsom in the Texarkana Division and now Judge J. Rodney Gilstrap in the Marshall Division and Judge Robert W. Schroeder III in the Texarkana Division, as well as Magistrate Judges Roy S. Payne, John Love and K. Nicole Mitchell. Perhaps because the district has a set of local rules for patent cases and relatively fast trial settings, patent plaintiffs have flocked to this small venue. In addition the proximity to larger cities (such as Dallas and Houston), along with a jury pool interested in protecting property rights, may attract patent cases to Marshall, Tyler, and Texarkana.

In 2003, there were 14 patent cases filed. In 2004, this number more than quadrupled to 59 patent cases filed. In 2006, the number of cases grew to an estimated 236.

The district has been perceived to be a favorable jurisdiction for plaintiffs in patent infringement lawsuits, which win 88% of the time compared to a nationwide average of 68% in 2006, even, according to some claims, in dubious cases (i.e. patent trolls).

Between 2004 and 2011 the district presided over TiVo Inc. v. EchoStar Corp., involving the issues of patent infringement and contempt of court.

In 2009 Judge Leonard Davis, of the U.S. District Court for the Eastern District of Texas, ordered a permanent injunction that "prohibits Microsoft from selling or importing to the United States any Microsoft Word products that have the capability of opening .XML, .DOCX or DOCM files (XML files) containing custom XML," according to an announcement by the plaintiff, Toronto-based i4i Inc.

In 2013, 24.5% of federal patent suits filed in the U.S. were filed in the Eastern District. Judges in this district have been found to grant requests for summary judgment of invalidity at a lower rate than the national average.

In 2014, 1,425 patent suits in the U.S. were filed in the Eastern District, making it the number one region with the most filings in the country, followed by the United States District Court for the District of Delaware in second place, with 946 patent cases filed, with the United States District Court for the Central District of California ranking third with 305 cases.

In 2015, a staggering 43.6% of federal patent suits (2,540 suits) were filed in the Eastern District, which was more than the number of lawsuits filed in the United States District Court for the District of Delaware (545 cases or 9.3%), the United States District Court for the Central District of California (300 cases or 5.1%), the United States District Court for the Northern District of California (228 cases or 3.9%) and the United States District Court for the Northern District of Illinois (162 cases or 2.8%) combined.

In 2016, 1,647 cases (or 36.4%) of the nation's patent cases were filed in the Eastern District, which was again more than the total number of lawsuits filed in the District of Delaware (455 cases or 10.1%), Central District of California (290 cases or 6.4%), Northern District of Illinois (247 cases or 5.5%) and Northern District of California (188 cases or 4.2%) combined.

The vast majority of the patent cases in the Eastern District of Texas are filed before or heard in the Marshall, Texas division by district court judge James Rodney Gilstrap and Magistrate Judge Roy S. Payne. U.S. district judge Robert W. Schroeder III in the Texarkana Division, and magistrate judges John Love and K. Nicole Mitchell hear the next highest number of patent cases in the district.

The filing of such cases in the Eastern District of Texas dropped after the 2017 Supreme Court decision in TC Heartland LLC v. Kraft Foods Group Brands LLC, which held that for the purpose of venue in patent infringement suits, a domestic corporation "resides" only in its state of incorporation. Meanwhile, the filing of such cases in the United States District Court for the District of Delaware increased.

== Current judges ==
As of March 1, 2025:

#	Title	Judge	Duty station	Born	Term of service			Appointed by
#	Title	Judge	Duty station	Born	Active	Chief	Senior	Appointed by
28	Chief Judge	Amos Mazzant	Sherman	1965	2014–present	2025–present	—	Obama
25	District Judge	Marcia A. Crone	Beaumont	1952	2003–present	—	—	G.W. Bush
27	District Judge	J. Rodney Gilstrap	Marshall	1957	2011–present	2018–2025	—	Obama
29	District Judge	Robert W. Schroeder III	Texarkana	1966	2014–present	—	—	Obama
30	District Judge	Jeremy Kernodle	Tyler	1976	2018–present	—	—	Trump
31	District Judge	J. Campbell Barker	Tyler	1980	2019–present	—	—	Trump
32	District Judge	Michael J. Truncale	Beaumont	1957	2019–present	—	—	Trump
33	District Judge	Sean D. Jordan	Plano	1965	2019–present	—	—	Trump
18	Senior Judge	Richard A. Schell	inactive	1950	1988–2015	1994–2001	2015–present	Reagan
24	Senior Judge	Ron Clark	Beaumont	1953	2002–2018	2015–2018	2018–present	G.W. Bush

== Former judges ==
#	Judge	Born–died	Active service	Chief Judge	Senior status	Appointed by	Reason for termination
1	John Charles Watrous	1801–1874	1857–1870 (Note: Reassigned from the District of Texas.)	—	—	Polk/Operation of law	resignation
2	Joel C. C. Winch	1835–1880	1870–1871 (Note: Recess appointment; the United States Senate later rejected the appointment.)	—	—	Grant	not confirmed
3	Amos Morrill	1809–1884	1872–1883	—	—	Grant	retirement
4	Chauncey Brewer Sabin	1824–1890	1884–1890	—	—	Arthur	death
5	David Ezekiel Bryant	1849–1910	1890–1910	—	—	B. Harrison	death
6	Gordon J. Russell	1859–1919	1910–1919	—	—	Taft	death
7	William Lee Estes	1870–1930	1920–1930	—	—	Wilson	death
8	Randolph Bryant	1893–1951	1931–1951	—	—	Hoover	death
9	Joseph Warren Sheehy	1910–1967	1951–1967	1954–1967	—	Truman	death
10	Lamar John Ryan Cecil	1902–1958	1954–1958 (Note: Recess appointment; formally nominated on November 8, 1954, confirmed by the Senate on December 2, 1954, and received commission on December 3, 1954.)	—	—	Eisenhower	death
11	Joseph Jefferson Fisher	1910–2000	1959–1984	1967–1980	1984–2000	Eisenhower	death
12	William Wayne Justice	1920–2009	1968–1998	1980–1990	1998–2009	L. Johnson	death
13	William Steger	1920–2006	1970–1987	—	1987–2006	Nixon	death
14	Robert Manley Parker	1937–2020	1979–1994	1990–1994	—	Carter	elevation
15	Howell Cobb	1922–2005	1985–2001	—	2001–2005	Reagan	death
16	Sam B. Hall Jr.	1924–1994	1985–1994	—	—	Reagan	death
17	Paul Neeley Brown	1926–2012	1985–2001	—	2001–2012	Reagan	death
19	John H. Hannah Jr.	1939–2003	1994–2003	2001–2003	—	Clinton	death
20	David Folsom	1947–present	1995–2012	2009–2012	—	Clinton	retirement
21	Thad Heartfield	1940–2022	1995–2010	2003–2009	2010–2022	Clinton	death
22	T. John Ward	1943–present	1999–2011	—	—	Clinton	retirement
23	Leonard Davis	1948–present	2002–2015	2012–2015	—	G.W. Bush	retirement
26	Michael H. Schneider Sr.	1943–present	2004–2016	—	2016	G.W. Bush	retirement

== Chief judges ==
Chief judges have administrative responsibilities with respect to their district court. Unlike the Supreme Court, where one justice is specifically nominated to be chief, the office of chief judge rotates among the district court judges. To be chief, a judge must have been in active service on the court for at least one year, be under the age of 65, and have not previously served as chief judge.

A vacancy is filled by the judge highest in seniority among the group of qualified judges. The chief judge serves for a term of seven years, or until age 70, whichever occurs first. The age restrictions are waived if no members of the court would otherwise be qualified for the position.

When the office was created in 1948, the chief judge was the longest-serving judge who had not elected to retire, on what has since 1958 been known as senior status, or declined to serve as chief judge. After August 6, 1959, judges could not become or remain chief after turning 70 years old. The current rules have been in operation since October 1, 1982.

== Succession of seats ==
Seat 1
Seat reassigned from the District of Texas on February 21, 1857 by 11 Stat. 164
Watrous	1857–1870
Winch	1870–1871
Morrill	1872–1883
Sabin	1884–1890
D. Bryant	1890–1910
Russell	1910–1919
Estes	1920–1930
R. Bryant	1931–1951
Sheehy	1951–1967
Justice	1968–1998
Ward	1999–2011
Mazzant III	2014–present

Seat 2
Seat established on February 10, 1954 by 68 Stat. 8
Cecil	1954–1958
Fisher	1959–1984
Hall, Jr.	1985–1994
Folsom	1995–2012
Schroeder III	2014–present

Seat 3
Seat established on June 2, 1970 by 84 Stat. 294
Steger	1970–1987
Schell	1988–2015
Jordan	2019–present

Seat 4
Seat established on October 20, 1978 by 92 Stat. 1629
Parker	1979–1994
Heartfield	1995–2010
Gilstrap	2011–present

Seat 5
Seat established on July 10, 1984 by 98 Stat. 333
Cobb	1985–2001
Clark	2002–2018
Truncale	2019–present

Seat 6
Seat established on July 10, 1984 by 98 Stat. 333
Brown	1985–2001
Davis	2002–2015
Barker	2019–present

Seat 7
Seat established on December 1, 1990 by 104 Stat. 5089
Hannah, Jr.	1994–2003
Schneider, Sr.	2004–2016
Kernodle	2018–present

Seat 8
Seat established on November 2, 2002 by 116 Stat. 1758 (temporary)
Seat made permanent on December 23, 2024 by 138 Stat. 2693
Crone	2003–present

== See also ==
- Courts of Texas
- List of current United States district judges
- List of United States federal courthouses in Texas
