= Judge Morrill =

Judge Morrill may refer to:

- Amos Morrill (1809–1884), judge of the United States District Court for the Eastern District of Texas
- Mendon Morrill (1902–1961), judge of the United States District Court for the District of New Jersey

== See also ==
- Justice Morrill (disambiguation)
