= Justice Morrill =

Justice Morrill may refer to:

- Amos Morrill (1809–1884), associate justice of the Texas Supreme Court
- John A. Morrill (1855–1945), associate justice of the Maine Supreme Judicial Court

== See also ==
- Judge Morrill (disambiguation)
