= Bobbie Williams =

American football player (born 1976)

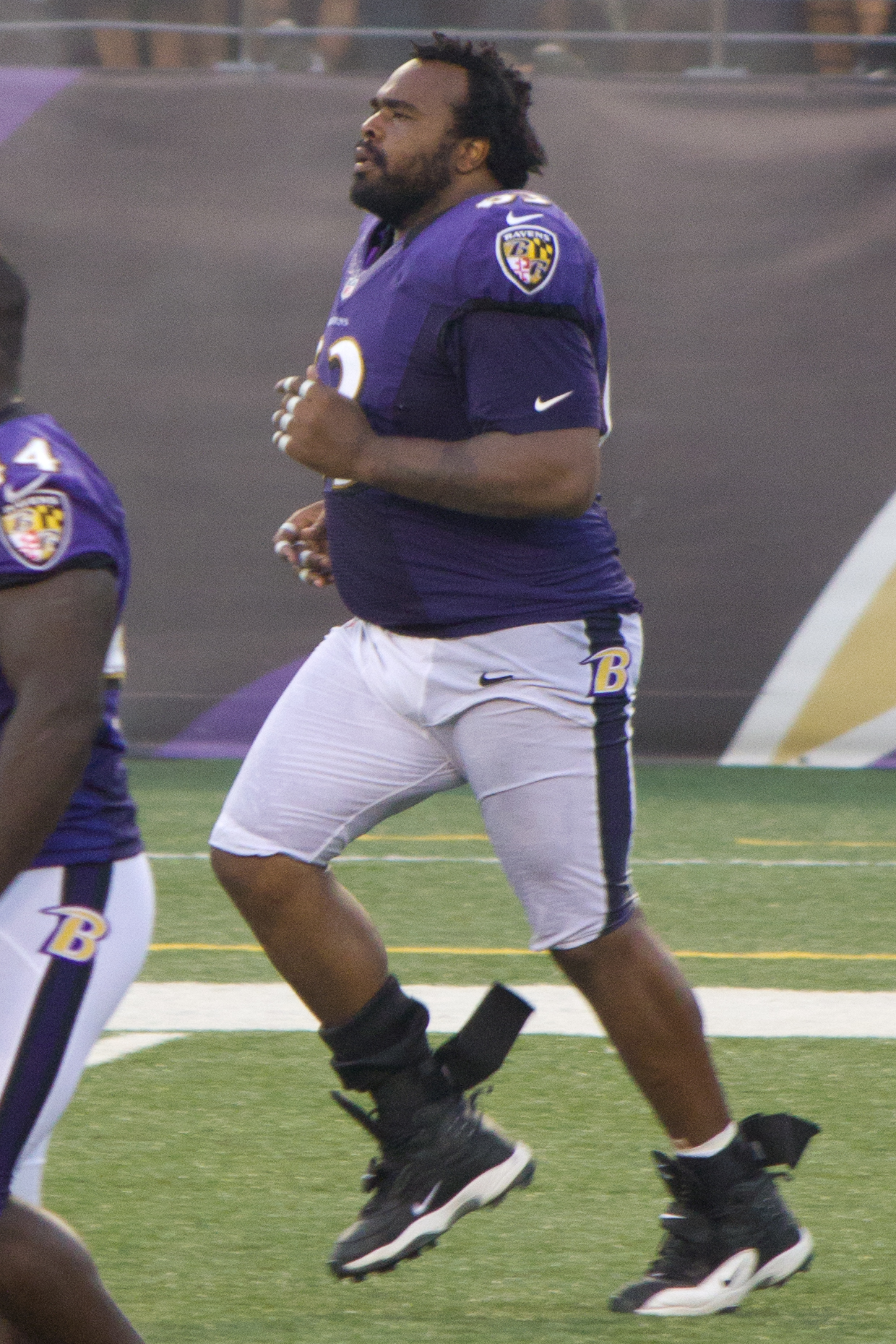
- Williams in 2012

No. 66, 63
- Position: Guard

Personal information
- Born: September 25, 1976 (age 50); Jefferson, Texas, U.S.
- Listed height: 6 ft 4 in (1.93 m)
- Listed weight: 345 lb (156 kg)

Career information
- High school: Jefferson
- College: Arkansas (1996–1999)
- NFL draft: 2000: 2nd round, 61st overall pick

Career history
- Philadelphia Eagles (2000–2003); Cincinnati Bengals (2004–2011); Baltimore Ravens (2012)

Awards and highlights
- Super Bowl champion (XLVII); Second-team All-SEC (1999)

Career NFL statistics
- Games played: 164
- Games started: 136
- Fumble recoveries: 4
- Stats at Pro Football Reference

Bobbie Joe Williams Jr. (born September 25, 1976) is an American former professional football player who was a guard in the National Football League (NFL). He played college football for the Arkansas Razorbacks and was selected by the Philadelphia Eagles in the second round of the 2000 NFL draft. Williams also played for the Cincinnati Bengals and Baltimore Ravens.

== Early life ==
Williams attended Jefferson High School in Jefferson, Texas, and was a letterman in football, basketball, and track and field. In football, he was named the East Texas Lineman of the Year as a senior. In basketball, he was an All-Distinct honoree. He has a daughter, Tiana, who attends University of Arkansas and a son, Brandon, who attends Rutgers University. He is known for being one of the kindest men in the NFL.

== College career ==
Williams started at tackle for the last 25 games of his career at the University of Arkansas. As a senior, Williams earned second-team All-Southeastern Conference honors, playing on a line that led the SEC in fewest sacks allowed (14), while helping the offense amass 4067 total yards. Williams also helped the Arkansas Razorbacks beat the Texas Longhorns 27–6 in the 2000 Cotton Bowl Classic.

Williams majored in vocational training.

== Professional career ==
=== Philadelphia Eagles ===
Williams was selected by the Philadelphia Eagles in the second round (61st overall) in the 2000 NFL draft. He was inactive throughout the entire 2000 season as he made the transition from tackle to guard. He made his NFL debut at the Tampa Bay Buccaneers on January 6, 2001, starting at right guard. Williams played in every game for the Eagles in 2002 and 2003 and also played in two playoff games in 2002. He took over the starting right guard job after an elbow injury to Jermane Mayberry in 2003. During his four years with Philadelphia, Williams helped the Eagles win three NFC East Division titles in a row (2001–2003), reaching the NFC Championship Game (2001–2003) during that three-year run.

=== Cincinnati Bengals ===
On March 26, 2004, Williams signed with the Cincinnati Bengals as an unrestricted free agent. He was the only player both on offense to play every snap on his unit. In 2005, Williams was part of the offensive line which only allowed 21 sacks which beat the previous franchise record of 24 sacks set in the 1972–73 season. He was re-signed to a two-year contract on April 5, 2010. In Week 14 of the 2011 NFL season, Williams broke his ankle in a 20–19 loss against the Houston Texans, causing him to miss the remainder of the season. During his time in Cincinnati, Williams helped the Bengals win two AFC North Division titles (2005, 2009).

=== Baltimore Ravens ===
On June 8, 2012, Williams signed a two-year contract with the Baltimore Ravens. He won his first career Super Bowl on February 3, 2013, when the Ravens defeated the San Francisco 49ers by a score of 34–31 in Super Bowl XLVII. He was a backup most of the season and started six games.

On March 8, 2013, Williams was released by the Ravens.
