= Joel C. C. Winch =

American judge

Judge of the United States District Court for the Eastern District of Texas
- In office October 11, 1870 – March 3, 1871
- Appointed by: Ulysses S. Grant
- Preceded by: John Charles Watrous
- Succeeded by: Amos Morrill

Personal details
- Born: Joel C. C. Winch; December 26, 1835 Northfield, Vermont, U.S.
- Died: December 7, 1880 (aged 44) Houston, Texas, U.S.
- Education: read law

Joel C. C. Winch (December 26, 1835 – December 7, 1880) was a United States district judge of the United States District Court for the Eastern District of Texas.

== Education and career ==
Born on December 26, 1835, in Northfield, Vermont, Winch read law in 1858. He was a teacher in Northfield until 1858. He entered private practice in Corsicana, Texas from 1859 to 1864. He continued private practice in Houston, Texas starting in 1864. He served as county attorney for Harris County, Texas and as district attorney for Austin, Texas. He was United States Attorney for the Eastern District of Texas from 1869 to 1870.

== Federal judicial service ==
Winch received a recess appointment from President Ulysses S. Grant on October 11, 1870, to a seat on the United States District Court for the Eastern District of Texas vacated by Judge John Charles Watrous. He was nominated to the same position by President Grant on December 15, 1870. His service terminated on March 3, 1871, after his nomination was not confirmed by the United States Senate, which never voted on his nomination.

== Later career and death ==
Following his departure from the federal bench, Winch resumed private practice in Houston, Texas from 1871 to 1880. He died on December 7, 1880, in Houston.

== Sources ==
Legal offices
Preceded by John Charles Watrous	Judge of the United States District Court for the Eastern District of Texas; 1870–1871	Succeeded by Amos Morrill
