= Jefferson, Texas =

- City
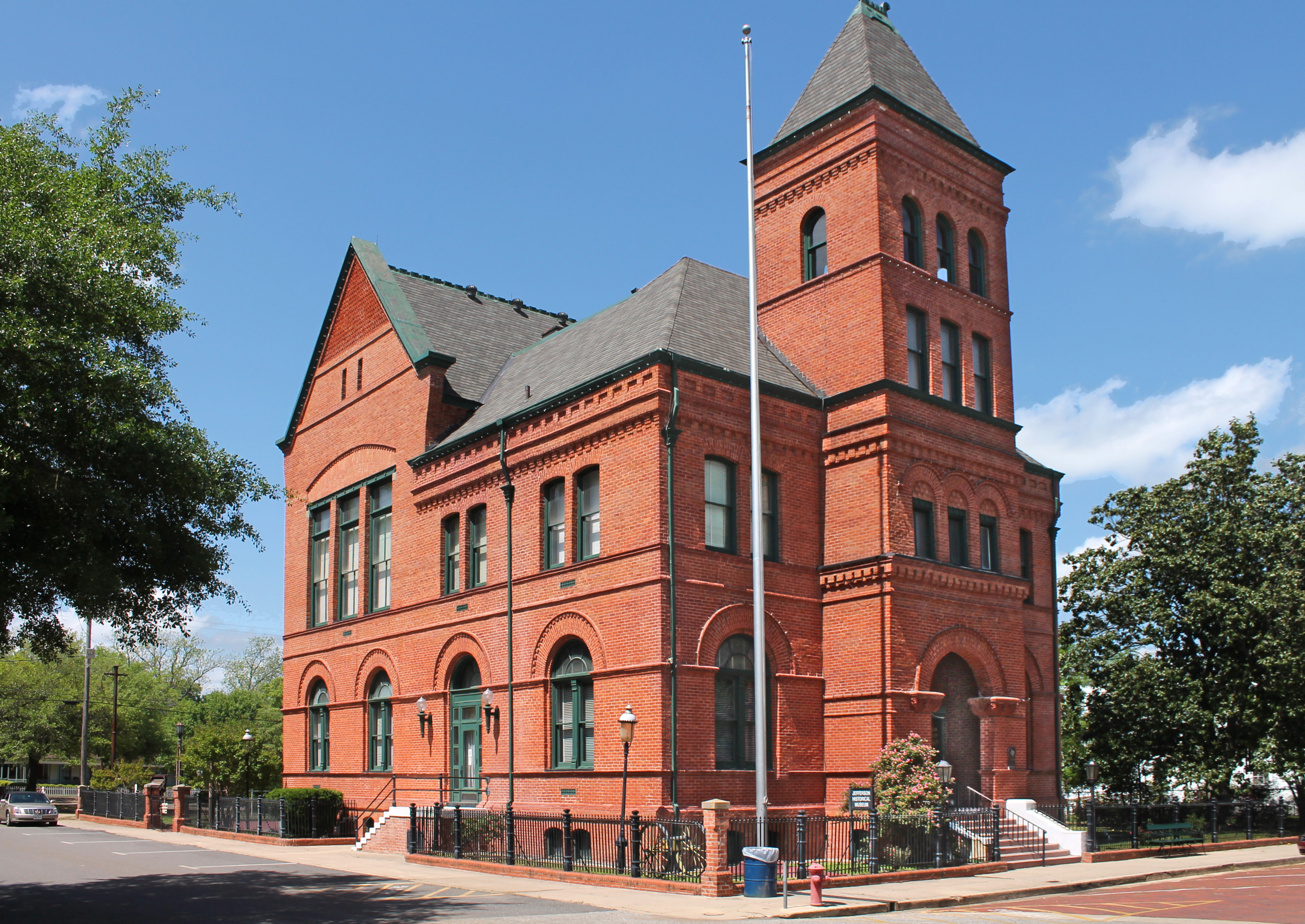
- The Old Post Office in Jefferson

- Logo

- Coordinates: 32°45′50″N 94°21′25″W
- Country: United States
- State: Texas
- County: Marion
- Founded: 1841
- Named for: Thomas Jefferson

Area
  - Total: 4.47 sq mi (11.59 km^{2})
  - Land: 4.45 sq mi (11.52 km^{2})
  - Water: 0.027 sq mi (0.07 km^{2})
- Elevation: 220 ft (67 m)

Population (2020)
  - Total: 1,875 ▼
  - Density: 420/sq mi (160/km^{2})
- Time zone: UTC-6 (Central)
  - Summer (DST): UTC-5 (CDT)
- ZIP code: 75657
- Area code: 903, 430
- FIPS code: 48-37528
- GNIS feature ID: 2410138
- Website: City of Jefferson

Jefferson is a city and county seat of Marion County, Texas, in Northeast Texas. It had a population of 1,875 as of the 2020 United States census.

== History ==
Almost every commercial building and house on the main arterial road in Jefferson has a historic marker.

Early records indicate that Jefferson was founded around 1841 on land ceded from the Caddo Indians. At that time, a log jam more than 100 miles long existed on the Red River north of present Natchitoches, Louisiana. The Indians said that this log jam, known as the Great Red River Raft, had always existed.

The Red River Raft (or Great Raft) acted as a dam on the river and raised the level of Caddo Lake and the Red River several feet. This rise of Caddo Lake and the corresponding rise in the Big Cypress Bayou at Jefferson permitted commercial riverboat travel to Jefferson from ports such as St. Louis and New Orleans via the Mississippi and Red Rivers.

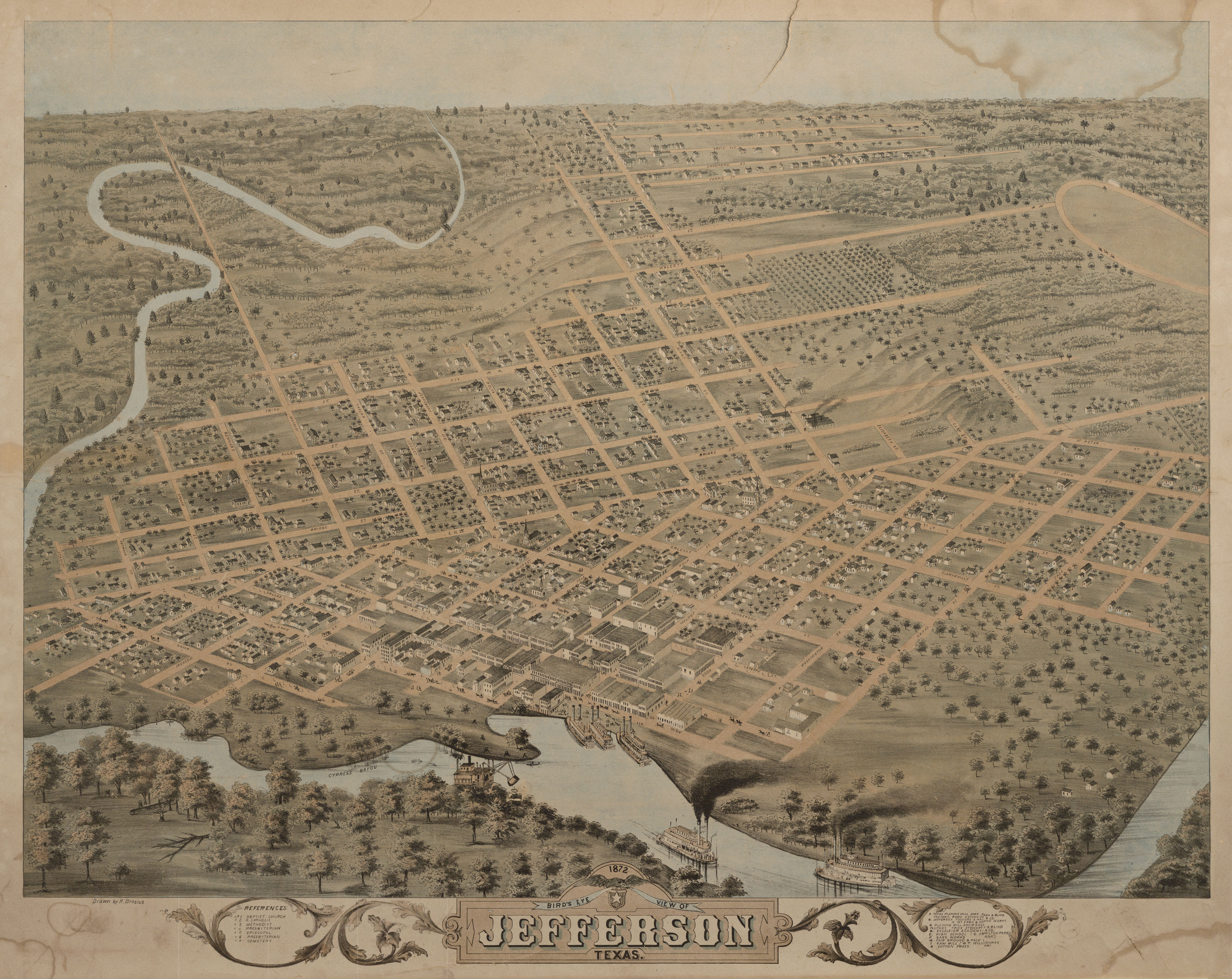
Panoramic map of Jefferson in 1872 by Herman Brosius, including a list of landmarks

Jefferson was one of the most important ports in Texas between 1845 and 1872. The town reached its peak population just a few years after the Civil War and is reported to have exceeded 30,000. During this time, Jefferson was the sixth-largest town in Texas.

Attempts were made over the years to remove the raft and permit the normal flow of the Red River, but they were unsuccessful until the discovery of nitroglycerin. In 1873, using nitroglycerin, the Army Corps of Engineers was finally able to clear the raft from the Red River. This lowered the level of Caddo Lake and Big Cypress to the extent that riverboat traffic to Jefferson was no longer commercially feasible. At the peak of river traffic, Jefferson had a population of over 7,000. A few years later, it had dropped to a little over 3,000.

The Sterne Fountain was given to the city in 1913 to honor the contribution of Jacob and Ernestine Sterne, a Jewish couple who settled in Jefferson before the Civil War and became prominent citizens who managed the post office and were involved in numerous civic and cultural projects. The fountain includes a statue of Hebe, the Greek goddess of youth, by Giuseppe Moretti.

One of the legends related to Jefferson referred to Jay Gould, the railroad magnate. The legend goes that Gould wanted to bring his railroad through Jefferson, but the town leaders refused because they had the river traffic. Gould said, "grass would grow in the streets" without the railroad. Gould credited with supporting the removal of the Red River Raft and the subsequent decline of Jefferson as a river port. Much of this tale is fiction. Townspeople obtained Gould's railcar, and it is displayed as a tourist attraction in downtown Jefferson.

Since 2000, Jefferson has been the location for the Pulpwood Queens Book Club Girlfriend Weekend's annual conference, attracting authors from all around the country.

== Geography ==
According to the United States Census Bureau, the city has a total area of 4.4 square miles (11 km^{2}), of which 0.1 sq mi (0.26 km^{2}) (1.58%) is covered by water.

=== Climate ===
The climate in this area is characterized by hot, humid summers and generally mild to cool winters. According to the Köppen climate classification, Jefferson has a humid subtropical climate, Cfa on climate maps.

Climate data for Jefferson, Texas (1991–2020 normals, extremes 1903–present)
Month	Jan	Feb	Mar	Apr	May	Jun	Jul	Aug	Sep	Oct	Nov	Dec	Year
Record high °F (°C)	82 (28)	92 (33)	89 (32)	94 (34)	97 (36)	107 (42)	107 (42)	112 (44)	109 (43)	97 (36)	87 (31)	88 (31)	112 (44)
Mean daily maximum °F (°C)	56.9 (13.8)	61.2 (16.2)	69.1 (20.6)	76.6 (24.8)	83.4 (28.6)	90.6 (32.6)	94.0 (34.4)	94.5 (34.7)	88.7 (31.5)	78.7 (25.9)	67.0 (19.4)	58.9 (14.9)	76.6 (24.8)
Daily mean °F (°C)	45.5 (7.5)	49.1 (9.5)	56.8 (13.8)	64.1 (17.8)	72.3 (22.4)	79.9 (26.6)	83.1 (28.4)	82.7 (28.2)	76.2 (24.6)	65.1 (18.4)	54.5 (12.5)	47.2 (8.4)	64.7 (18.2)
Mean daily minimum °F (°C)	34.2 (1.2)	37.1 (2.8)	44.4 (6.9)	51.5 (10.8)	61.2 (16.2)	69.3 (20.7)	72.2 (22.3)	70.8 (21.6)	63.6 (17.6)	51.5 (10.8)	42.1 (5.6)	35.4 (1.9)	52.8 (11.6)
Record low °F (°C)	7 (−14)	−4 (−20)	15 (−9)	28 (−2)	38 (3)	46 (8)	55 (13)	52 (11)	38 (3)	25 (−4)	16 (−9)	−5 (−21)	−5 (−21)
Average precipitation inches (mm)	4.08 (104)	4.23 (107)	4.83 (123)	4.74 (120)	5.11 (130)	5.10 (130)	2.96 (75)	2.42 (61)	3.77 (96)	4.47 (114)	3.61 (92)	4.42 (112)	49.74 (1,263)
Average snowfall inches (cm)	0.5 (1.3)	0.7 (1.8)	0.1 (0.25)	0.0 (0.0)	0.0 (0.0)	0.0 (0.0)	0.0 (0.0)	0.0 (0.0)	0.0 (0.0)	0.0 (0.0)	0.0 (0.0)	0.0 (0.0)	1.3 (3.3)
Average precipitation days (≥ 0.01 in)	8.3	8.5	8.7	7.6	8.2	7.7	5.5	5.8	5.6	6.8	7.9	8.8	89.4
Average snowy days (≥ 0.1 in)	0.2	0.4	0.1	0.0	0.0	0.0	0.0	0.0	0.0	0.0	0.0	0.0	0.7
Source: NOAA

== Demographics ==
Historical population
Census	Pop.	Note	%±
1860	988		—
1870	4,190		324.1%
1880	3,260		−22.2%
1890	3,072		−5.8%
1900	2,850		−7.2%
1910	2,515		−11.8%
1920	2,549		1.4%
1930	2,329		−8.6%
1940	2,797		20.1%
1950	3,164		13.1%
1960	3,082		−2.6%
1970	2,866		−7.0%
1980	2,643		−7.8%
1990	2,199		−16.8%
2000	2,024		−8.0%
2010	2,106		4.1%
2020	1,875		−11.0%
U.S. Decennial Census

=== 2020 census ===
As of the 2020 census, Jefferson had a population of 1,875. The median age was 52.3 years; 18.1% of residents were under 18 and 29.8% were 65 or older. For every 100 females, there were 83.6 males, and for every 100 females 18 and over, there were 79.0 males 18 and over. None of the residents lived in urban areas; all lived in rural areas.

Of the 829 households in Jefferson, 24.5% had children under 18 living in them, 36.6% were married-couple households, 18.7% were households with a male householder and no spouse or partner present, and 40.0% were households with a female householder and no spouse or partner present. About 37.4% of all households were made up of individuals, and 16.5% had someone living alone who was 65 or older.

Of the 1,003 housing units, 17.3% were vacant. The homeowner vacancy rate was 3.1%, and the rental vacancy rate was 10.6%.

Racial composition as of the 2020 census
Race	Number	Percent
White	1,114	59.4%
Black or African American	627	33.4%
American Indian and Alaska Native	12	0.6%
Asian	17	0.9%
Some other race	12	0.6%
Two or more races	93	5.0%
Hispanic or Latino (of any race)	45	2.4%

The 2020 figures show the city remained predominantly non-Hispanic White.

=== 2010 census ===
In the 2010 U.S. census, 2,199 people, 871 households, and 544 families resided in the city. The population density was 465.7 inhabitants per square mile (179.8/km^{2}). The 1,042 housing units had an average density of 239.7 per square mile (92.5/km^{2}).

The racial makeup of the city in 2010 was 62.80% White, 34.68% African American, 0.40% Native American, 0.84% Asian, 0.05% Pacific Islander, 0.54% from other races, and 0.69% from two or more races. Hispanics or Latinos of any race were 1.63% of the population.

=== 2000 census ===
At the 2000 census, the median income in the city for a household was $17,034 and for a family was $26,250. Males had a median income of $28,929 versus $14,583 for females. The per capita income for the city was $15,558. About 29.4% of families and 32.9% of the population were below the poverty line, including 54.1% of those under 18 and 22.7% of those 65 or over.

=== 2020 American Community Survey ===
At the American Community Survey of 2020, its median household income was $40,306 with a mean income at $67,961.

== Education ==
The city of Jefferson is served by the Jefferson Independent School District.

== Notable people ==
- Diamond Bessie (1854–1877), 19th-century murder victim
- Vernon Dalhart, popular singer and songwriter, member of Country Music Hall of Fame
- Montrae Holland, NFL player, 2003–2011
- Robert Potter, Secretary of the Navy during the Texas Revolution
- Rafael Robinson, NFL player, 1992–1997
- Bobbie Williams, NFL player, 2000–2013 Super Bowl Champion (XLVII)

== See also ==
- The Grove
- Jefferson Jimplecute
- Texas and Pacific Railway
