= Henry Wellge =

American lithographer (1850–1917)

Henry Wellge (1850-1917) was a lithographer in the United States. He produced panoramic maps. He had an office in Milwaukee, Wisconsin.

Some of his maps were published by Norris, Wellge & Co., others by Henry Wellge & Co. or the American Publishing Co.

His view of Bangor, Maine depicts the era when sail and steam power were both in use on the Penobscot River.

Wellge was one of five men who produced more than half the panoramic maps in the Library of Congress' collection. He depicted about 152 locations.

== List of cities he depicted ==
- Sherbrooke, Quebec, 1881
- Canon City, Colorado, 1882
- Colorado Springs, Colorado City, and Manatou, Colorado, 1882
- Del Norte, Colorado, 1882
- Greeley, Colorado, 1882
- Gunnison, Colorado, 1882
- Las Vegas, New Mexico, 1882
- Leadville, Colorado, 1882
- Poncho, Colorado, 1882
- Salida, Colorado, 1882
- Santa Fe, New Mexico, 1882
- Key West, Florida, 1884
- Missoula, Montana, 1884
- Orlando, Florida, 1884
- Tacoma, Washington Territory, 1884
- Birmingham, Alabama, 1885
- Denison, Texas, 1885
- Lake City, Florida, 1885
- Monticello, Florida, 1885
- Paris, Texas, 1885
- Pensacola, Florida, 1885
- Saint Augustine, Florida, 1885
- Tallahassee, Florida, 1885
- Thomasville, Georgia, 1885
- Valdosta, Georgia, 1885
- Chattanooga, Tennessee, 1886
- Columbus, Georgia, 1886
- Fort Worth, Texas, 1886
- Greenville, Texas, 1886
- Honey Grove, Texas, 1886
- Waco, Texas, 1886
- Macon, Georgia, 1887
- Memphis, Tennessee, 1887
- Anniston, Alabama, 1887
- Gadsden, Alabama, 1887
- Montgomery, Alabama, 1887
- Selma, Alabama, 1887
- Tuskaloosa, Alabama, 1887
- Davenport, Iowa, 1888
- Evansville, Indiana, 1888
- Hot Springs, Arkansas, 1888
- Little Rock, Arkansas, 1887
- Nashville, Tennessee, 1888
- Van Buren, Arkansas, 1888
- Texarkana, Texas and Arkansas, 1888
- Cairo, Illinois, 1888
- West Superior, Wisconsin, 1887
- Sioux City, Iowa, 1888
- Burlington, Iowa, 1889
- Denver, Colorado, 1889
- Dubuque, Iowa, 1889
- Fort Madison, Iowa, 1889
- Moline, Illinois, 1889
- Helena, Montana, 1890
- Mexico City, Mexico, 1890
- Pueblo, Colorado, 1890
- Fort Worth, Texas, 1891
- Missoula, Montana, 1891
- Laredo, Texas, 1892
- Chattanooga, Tennessee, 1897
- Billings, Montana, 1904
- Butte, Montana, 1904
- Yellowstone National Park, 1904
- Mexico City, Mexico, 1906
- New York City, 1911
- Keweenaw Peninsula, Upper Peninsula, Michigan, 1913
- DeLand, Florida
- Laredo, Texas

== Gallery ==
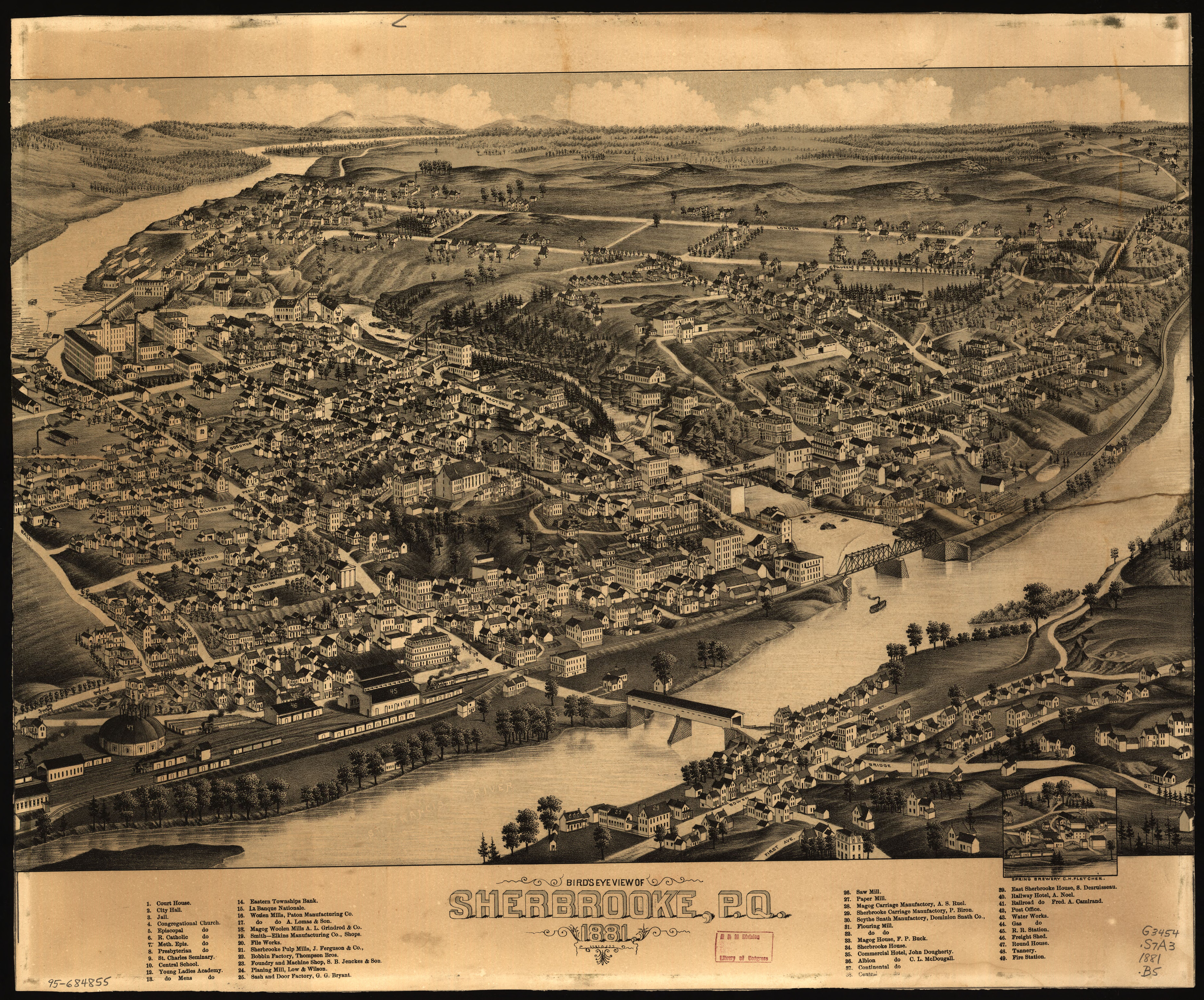
Sherbrooke, Quebec, 1881

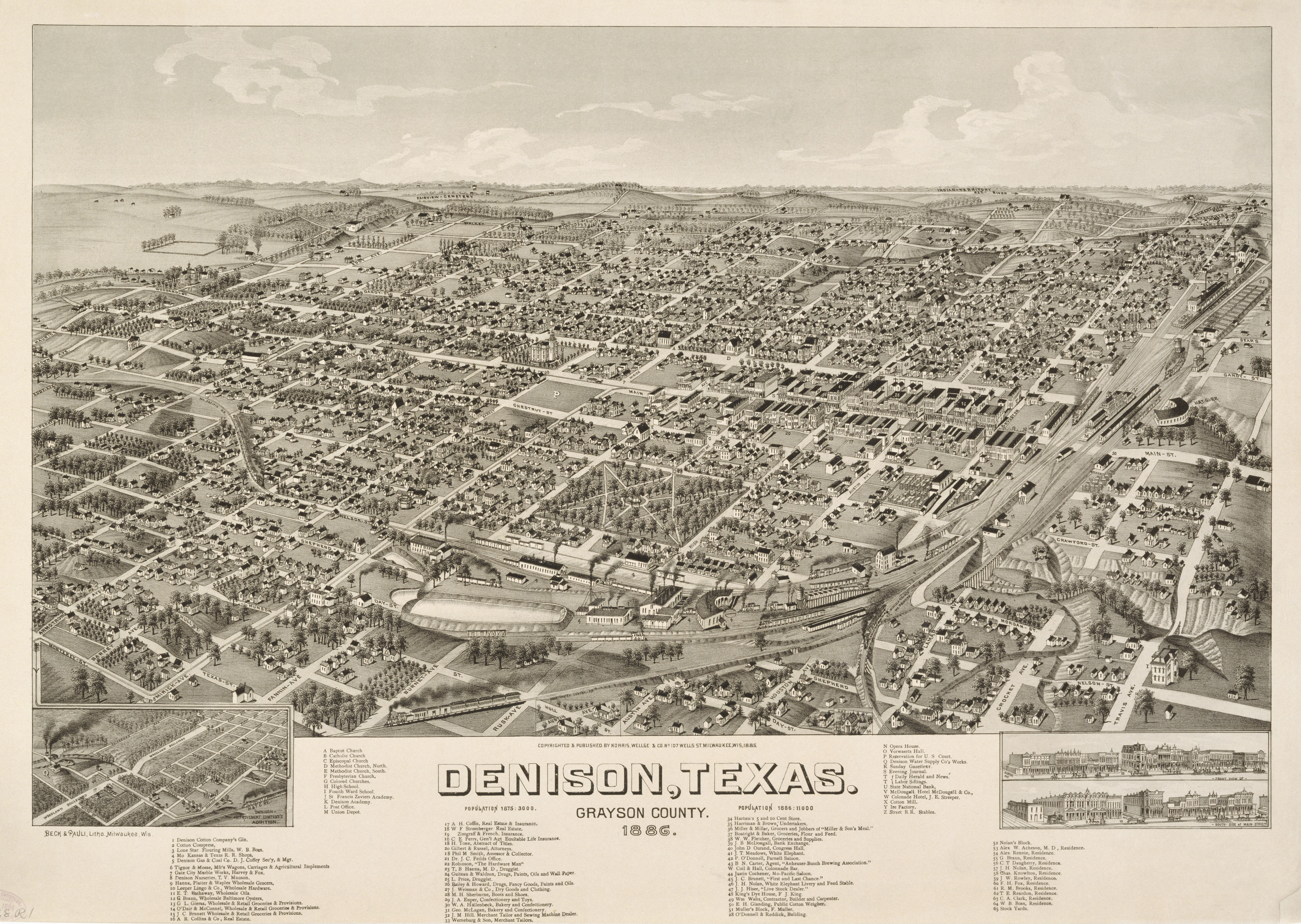
Denison, Texas, 1886

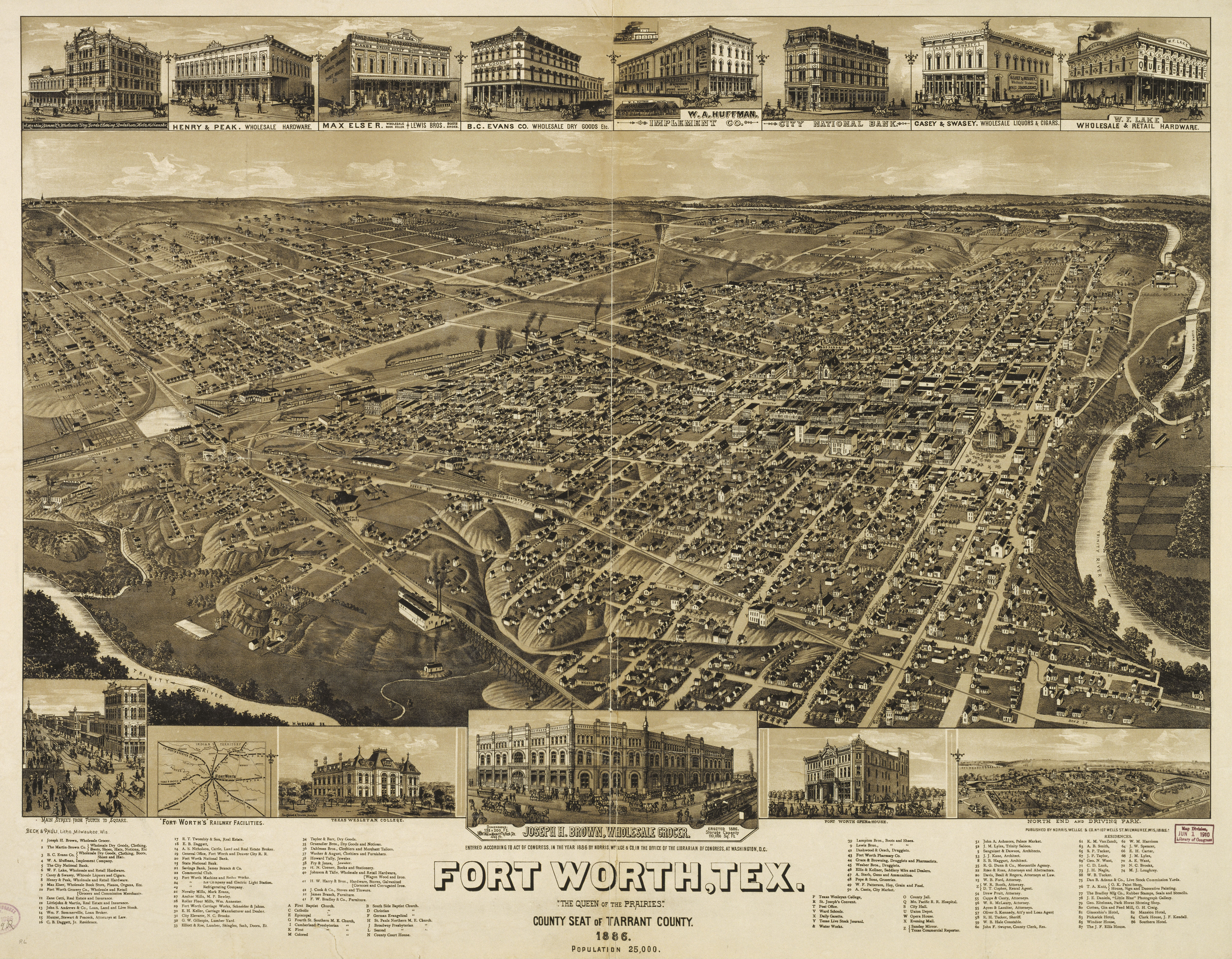
Fort Worth, Texas, 1886

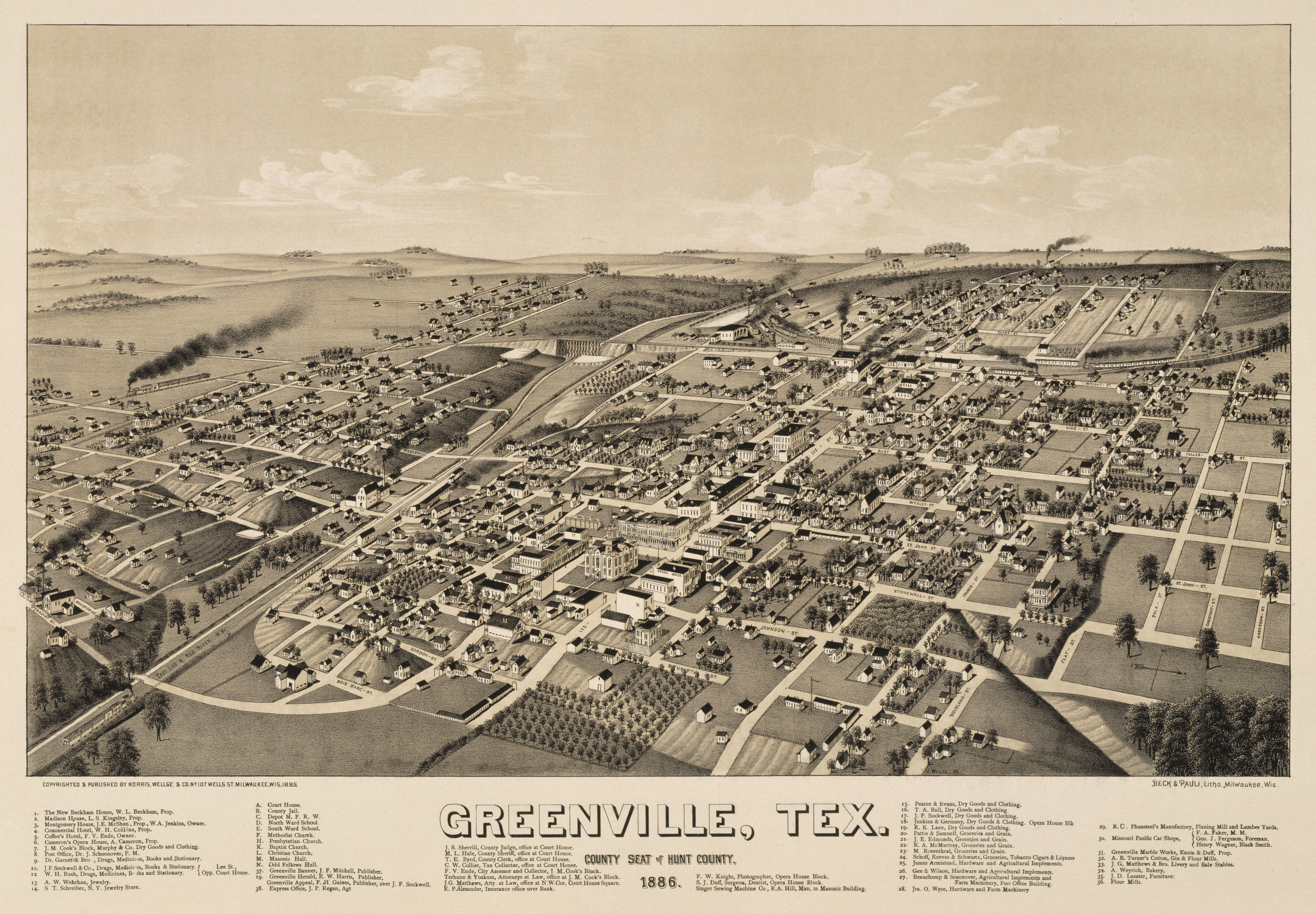
Greenville, Texas, 1886

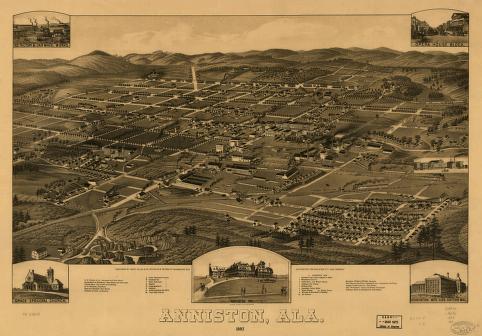
Anniston, Alabama, 1887

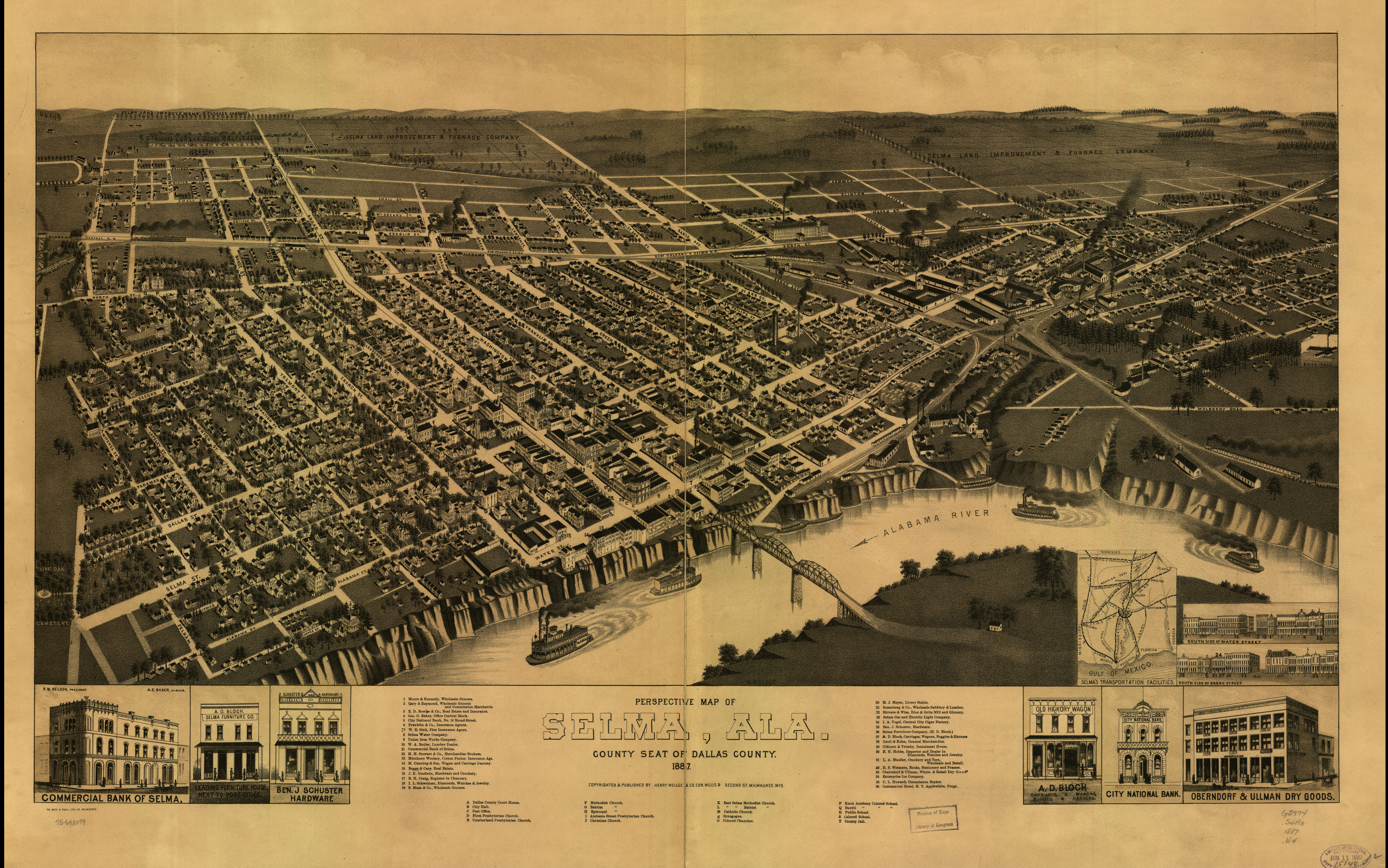
Selma, Alabama, 1887
