= Camille N. Drie =

American draughtsman

Camille N. Drie (active 1871–1904) also known as Camille N. Dry, was a draughtsman active in the Southern United States. Drie created pictorial maps of various cities, including a 110-sheet view of St. Louis, Missouri (1875). The Library of Congress has a collection of his work.

Urban planning historian John W. Reps cites Drie's 1875 110-sheet view of St. Louis as a "tour de force" in a 1984 catalog, describing its scale and accuracy as "an accomplishment beyond any reasonable expectation." Drie worked with Richard J. Compton to produce the St. Louis project, and likely also had a team of assistants, although none are named in his records. Drie is recorded as having lived in St. Louis from 1875 to 1878.

Drie also produced pictorial maps of Galveston, Texas; Anniston, Alabama, and Vicksburg, Mississippi. His final work was a plot of Birmingham, Alabama, published in 1904.

== Gallery ==
Selected works by Drie
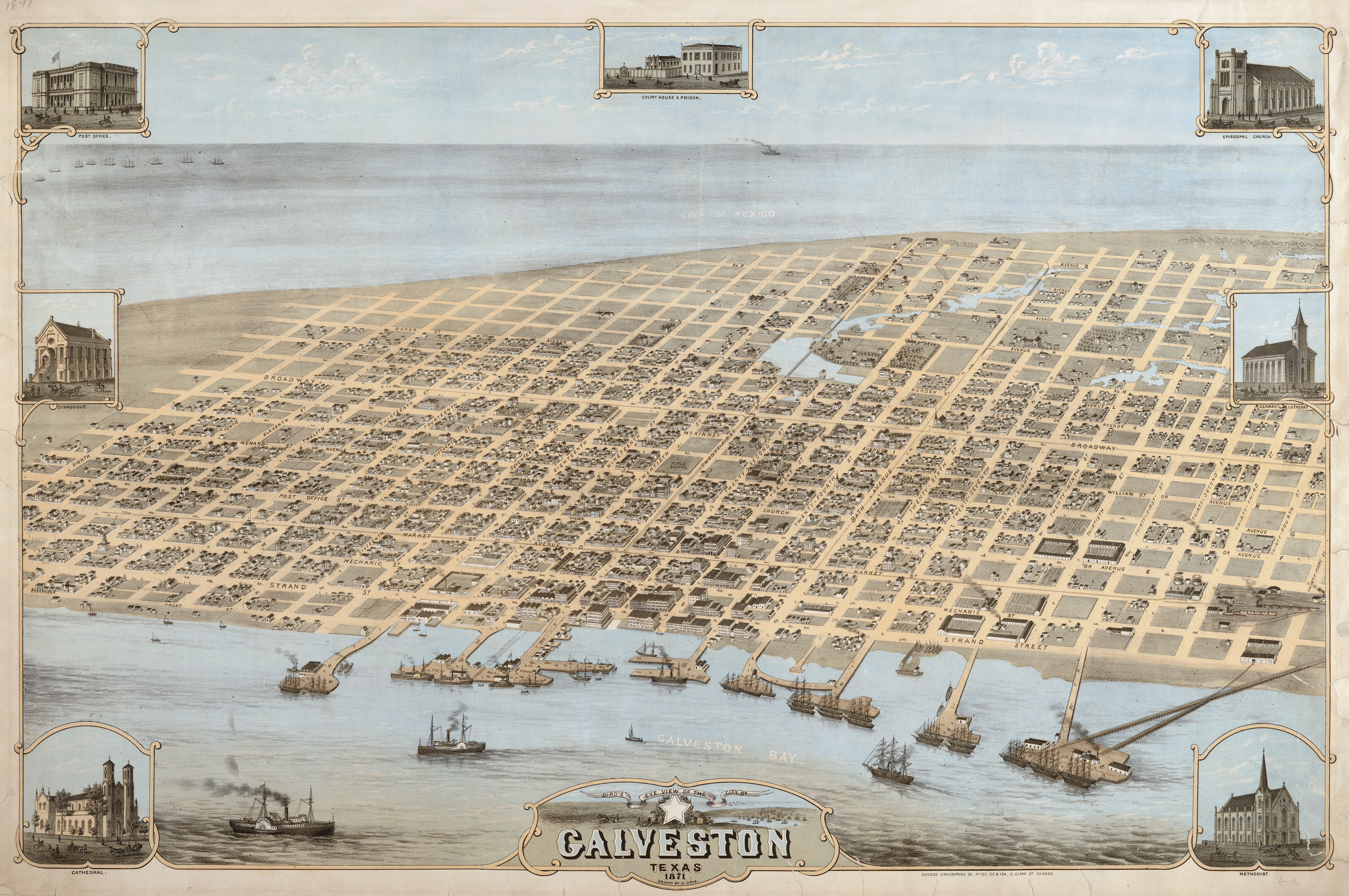
Bird's Eye View of the City of Galveston Texas, 1871

St. Louis, the great metropolis of the Mississippi valley; a topographical survey drawn in perspective, 1875

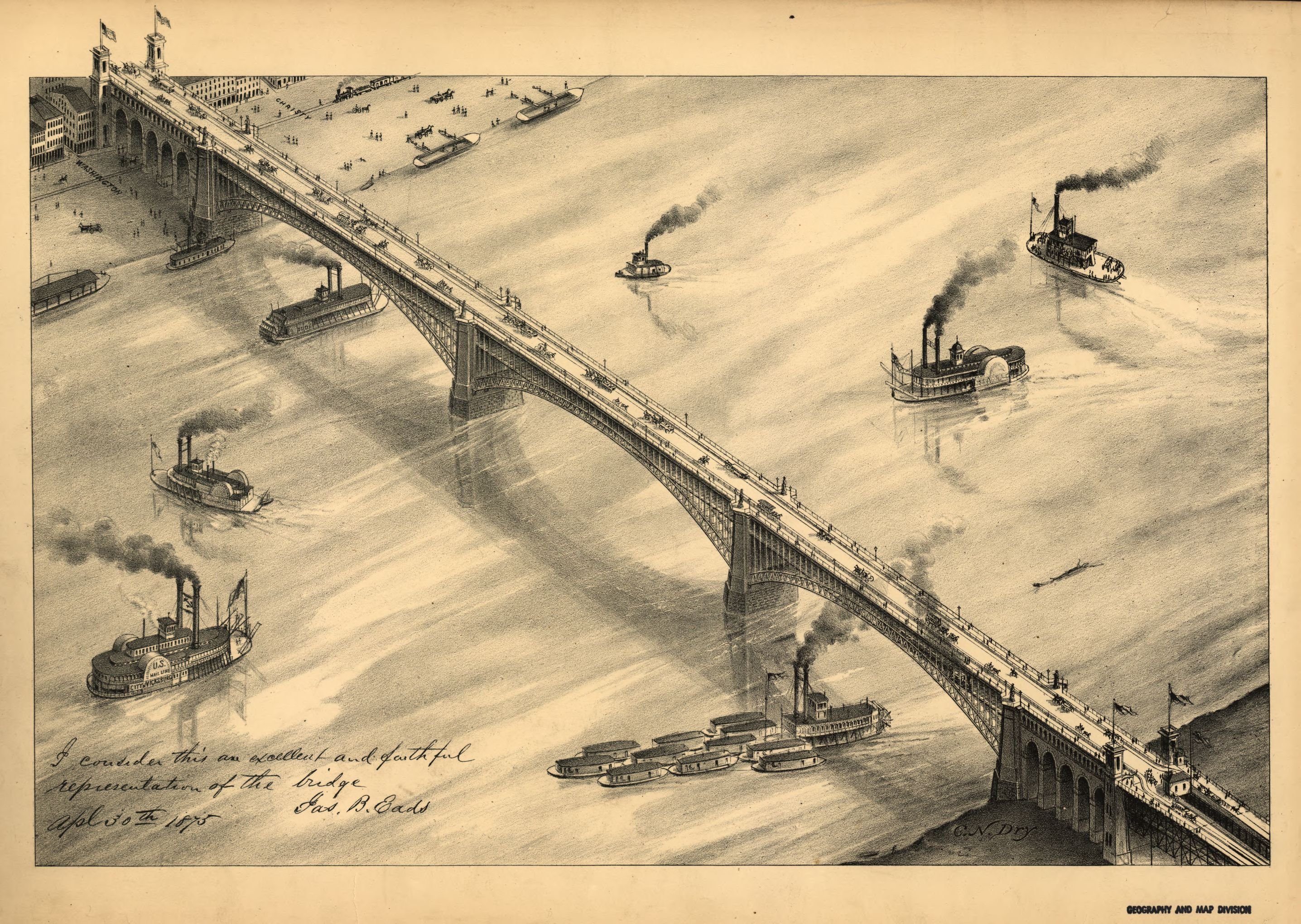
Drawing of the Eads Bridge, 1875

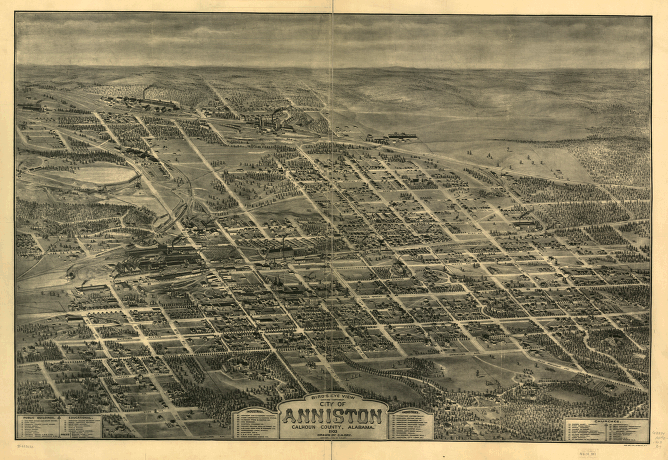
Bird's eye view looking northwest, city of Anniston, Calhoun County, Alabama, 1903

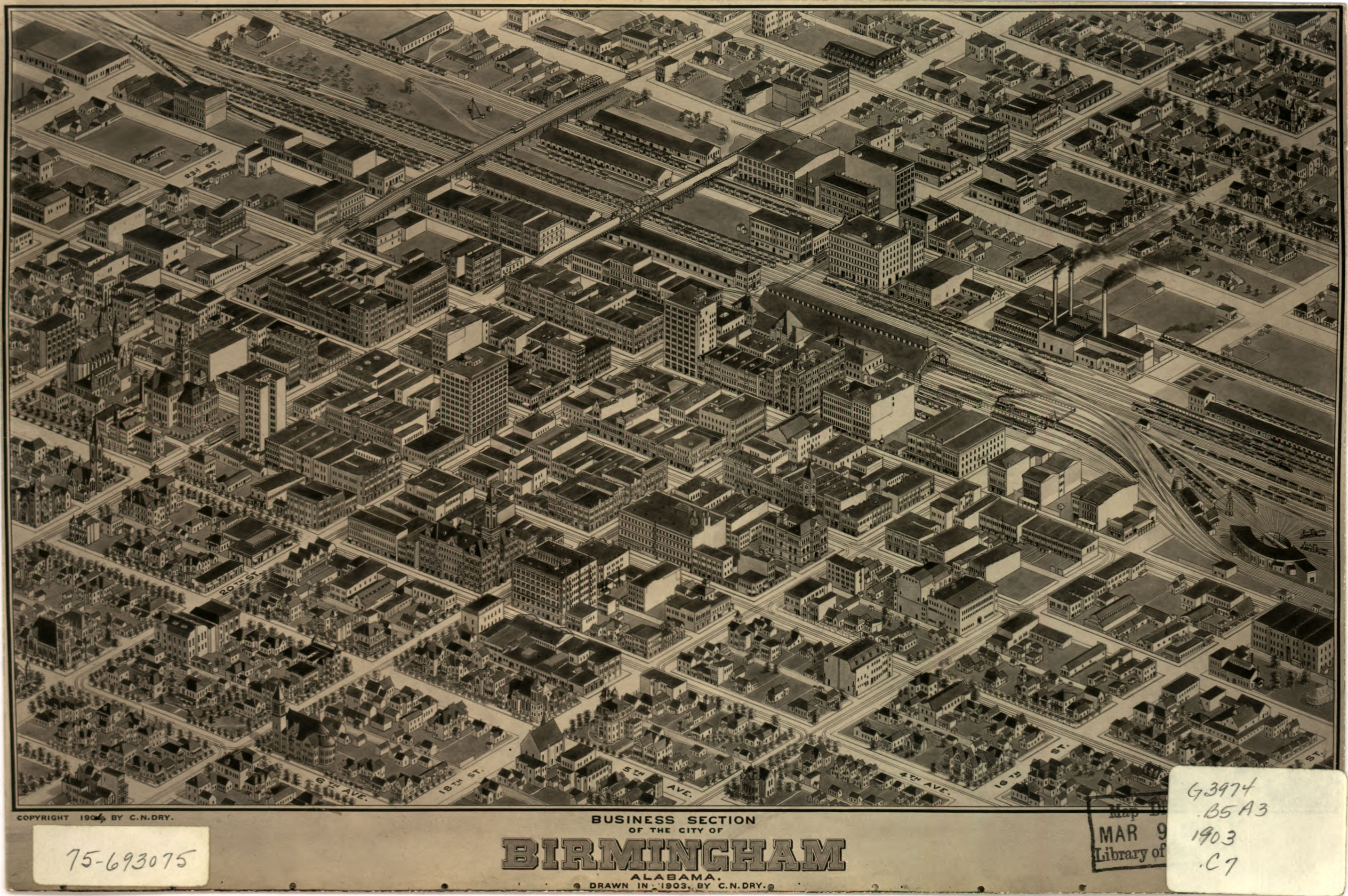
Business section of the city of Birmingham, Alabama, 1904

== See also ==
- Herman Brosius
