= Thaddeus Mortimer Fowler =

American cartographer

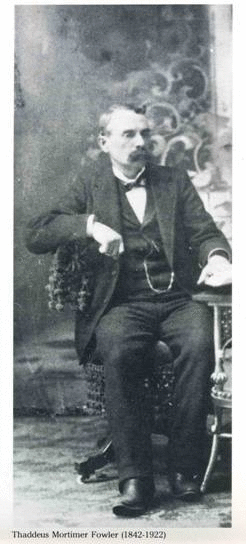
- Fowler in March 1922
- Born: December 21, 1842; Lowell, Massachusetts, U.S.
- Died: March 1922 (aged 79); New York, U.S.
- Known for: panoramic/pictorial maps

Thaddeus Mortimer Fowler, often credited as T.M. Fowler (1842–1922), was an American cartographer. He is best known for his work on panoramic maps. A large portion of his work focused on Pennsylvania. He is considered the most prolific maker of Pennsylvania panoramas in the mid-19th century.

== Early life ==
Fowler was born in Lowell, Massachusetts. He served as a soldier in the United States Civil War, and was injured in battle.

He worked for his uncle who was a photographer.

== Career ==
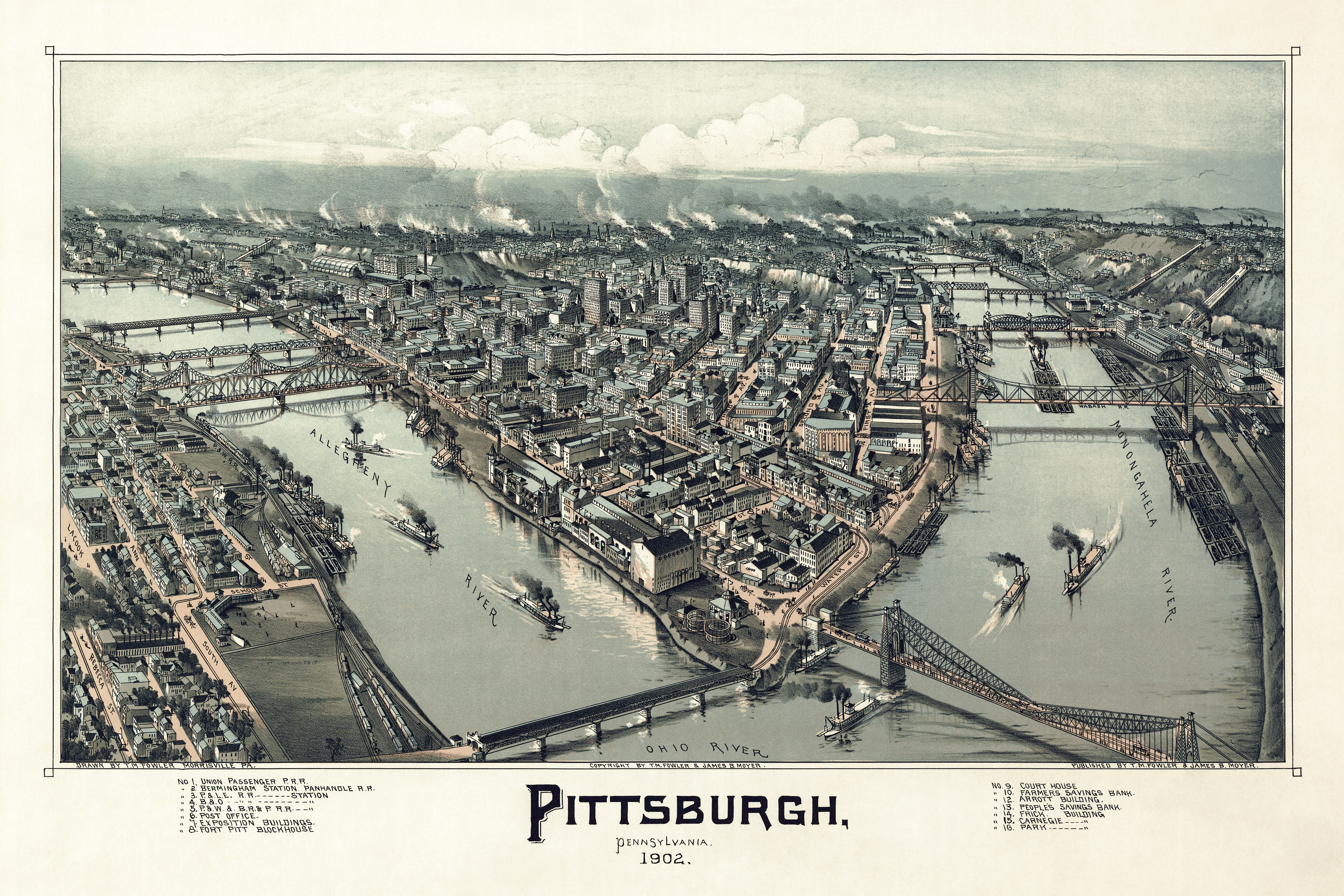
A 1902 lithograph of Pittsburgh by Fowler

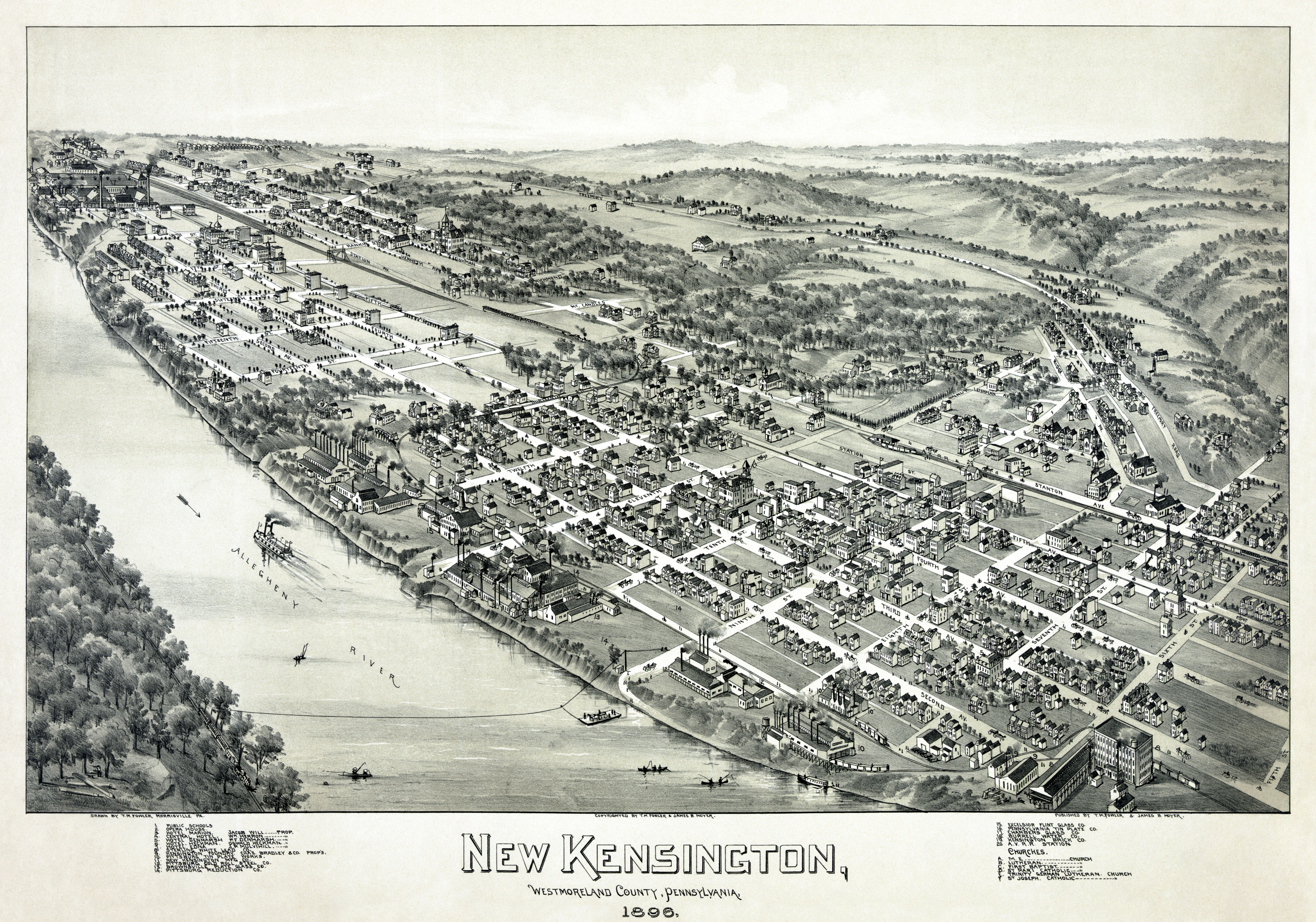
Fowler's lithographic panoramic map of New Kensington, Pennsylvania in 1896, now in the Fowler collection at the Library of Congress in Washington, D.C.

Fowler started his own business as a cartographer focusing on panoramic maps. His photographer uncle also worked for the firm. The business was located in Madison, Wisconsin. He made maps for Canada and 21 different U.S. states.

=== Collections ===
The Library of Congress in Washington, D.C., maintains an extensive collection of Fowler's works, which represent the largest collection of panoramic maps in the library's collection. His work is also held in the collection of Pennsylvania State University, Yale University, and the Boston Public Library.

== Personal life ==
Fowler lived in Lewisburg and Shamokin, Pennsylvania, from 1881 to 1885. He also lived in Trenton, New Jersey.

In 1885, he moved to Morrisville, Pennsylvania. He lived in Morrisville, where his business was located, until 1910. Fowler died of a heart attack in New York in 1922 and was interred in Trenton, New Jersey.
