= Pictorial map =

Map that uses pictures to represent features

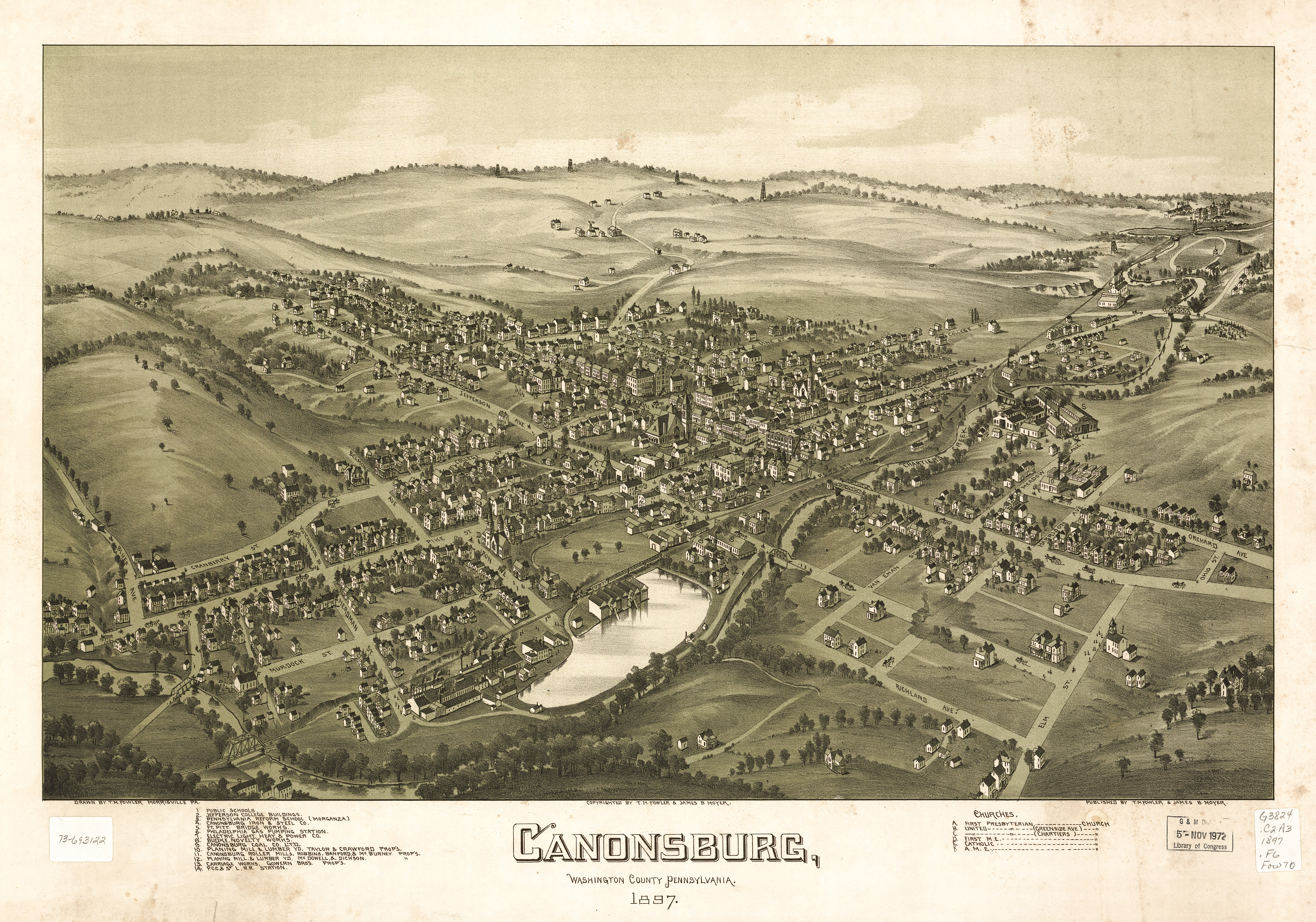
An 1897 pictorial map of Canonsburg, Pennsylvania by Thaddeus Mortimer Fowler and James B. Moyer

Pictorial maps (also known as illustrated maps, panoramic maps, perspective maps, bird's-eye view maps, and geopictorial maps) depict a given territory with a more artistic rather than technical style. It is a type of map in contrast to road map, atlas, or topographic map. The cartography can be a sophisticated 3-D perspective landscape or a simple map graphic enlivened with illustrations of buildings, people and animals. They can feature varied topics like historical events, legendary figures or local agricultural products and cover anything from an entire continent to a college campus. Drawn by specialized artists and illustrators, pictorial maps are a rich, centuries-old tradition and a diverse art form that ranges from cartoon maps on restaurant placemats to treasured art prints in museums.

Pictorial maps usually show an area as if viewed from above at an oblique angle. They are not generally drawn to scale in order to show street patterns, individual buildings, and major landscape features in perspective. While regular maps focus on the accurate rendition of distances, pictorial maps enhance landmarks and often incorporate a complex interplay of different scales into one image in order to give the viewer a more familiar sense of recognition. With an emphasis on objects and style, these maps cover an artistic spectrum from childlike caricature to spectacular landscape graphic, with the better ones being attractive, informative and highly accurate. Some require thousands of hours to produce.

== The history and tradition of pictorial maps ==
Pictorial map of Paris by Claes Jansz. Visscher

The history of pictorial maps overlaps much with the history of cartography in general, and ancient artifacts suggest that pictorial mapping has been around since recorded history began.

In Medieval cartography, pictorial icons as well as religious and historical ideas usually overshadowed accurate geographic proportions. A classic example of this is the T and O map, which represented the three known continents in the form of a cross, with Jerusalem at its center. The more precise art of illustrating detailed bird's-eye-view urban landscapes flourished during the European Renaissance. As emerging trade centers such as Venice began to prosper, local rulers commissioned artists to develop pictorial overviews of their towns to help them organize trade fairs and direct the increasing flow of visiting merchants. When printing came around, pictorial maps evolved into some of the earliest forms of advertising as cities competed amongst themselves to attract larger shares of the known world's commerce.

Later, during the Age of Exploration, maps became progressively more accurate for navigation needs and were often sprinkled with sketches and drawings such as sailing ships showing the direction of trade winds, little trees and mounds to represent forests and mountains and, of course, plenty of sea creatures and exotic natives, much of them imaginary. As the need for geographical accuracy increased, these illustrations gradually slipped off the map and onto the borders and eventually disappeared altogether in the wake of modern scientific cartography.

== 19th century ==
A 19th-century pictorial map plate of a rural and industrial area in St. Louis

As cartography evolved, the pictorial art form went its own way and regained popularity in the 19th century with the development of the railroads. Between 1825 and 1875, the production and collection of panoramic maps of cities rose to something of a mania. In the U.S. alone, thousands of panoramic maps were produced. The leading panoramic map artists in the U.S.A. were Herman Brosius, Camille N. Drie, Thaddeus Mortimer Fowler, Paul Giraud, Augustus Koch, D. D. Morse, Henry Wellge, and A. L. Westyard. Sometimes artistic exaggeration bordered on the fraudulent, as some travelers were drawn by images of idyllic, bustling towns with humming factories only to find a sad little bunch of mud-soaked shacks when they got there. A vast collection of these prints is maintained by the Library of Congress, and many of the more beautiful ones continue to be reprinted and sold to this day.

== 20th century ==
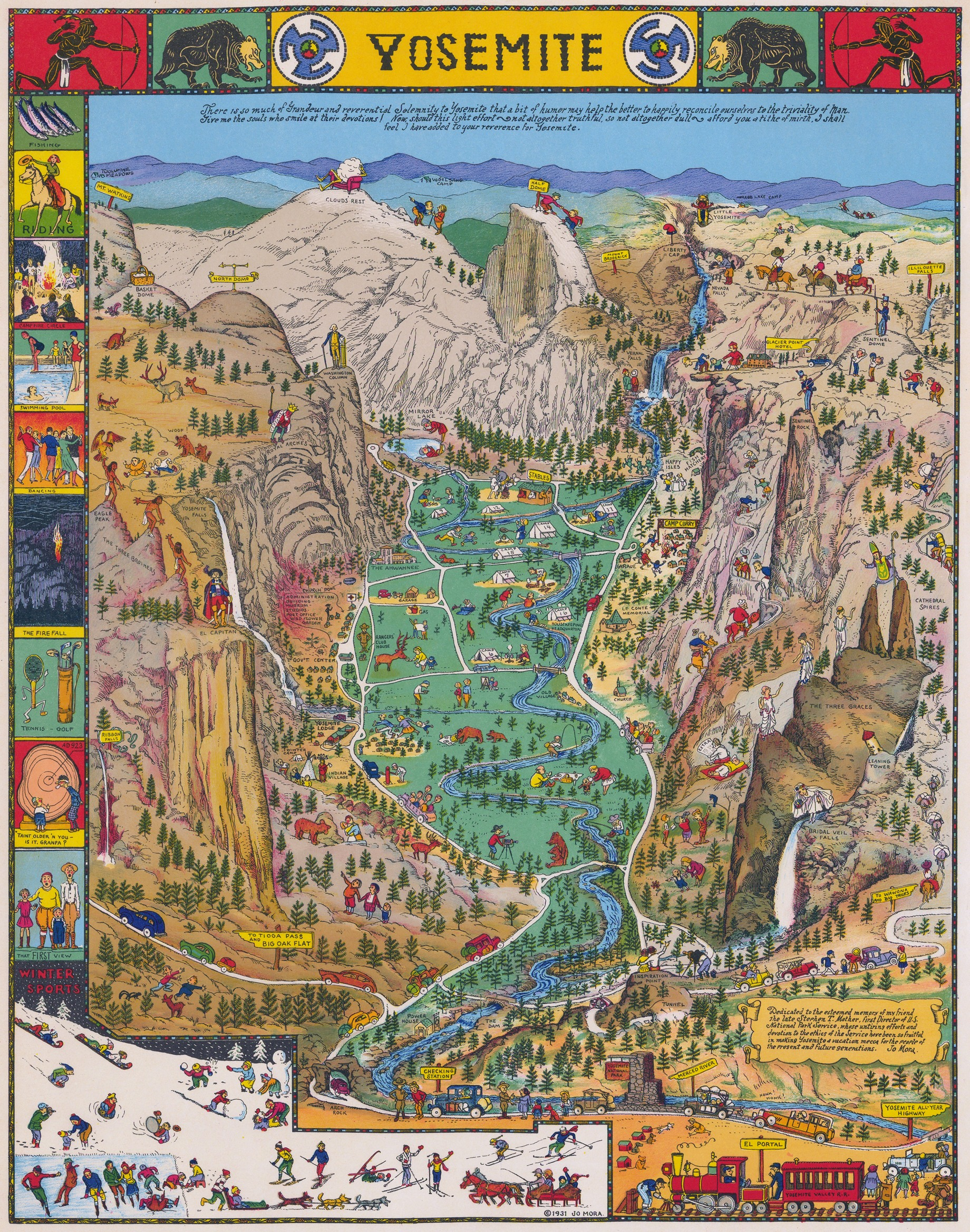
"Yosemite" by Jo Mora, 1931

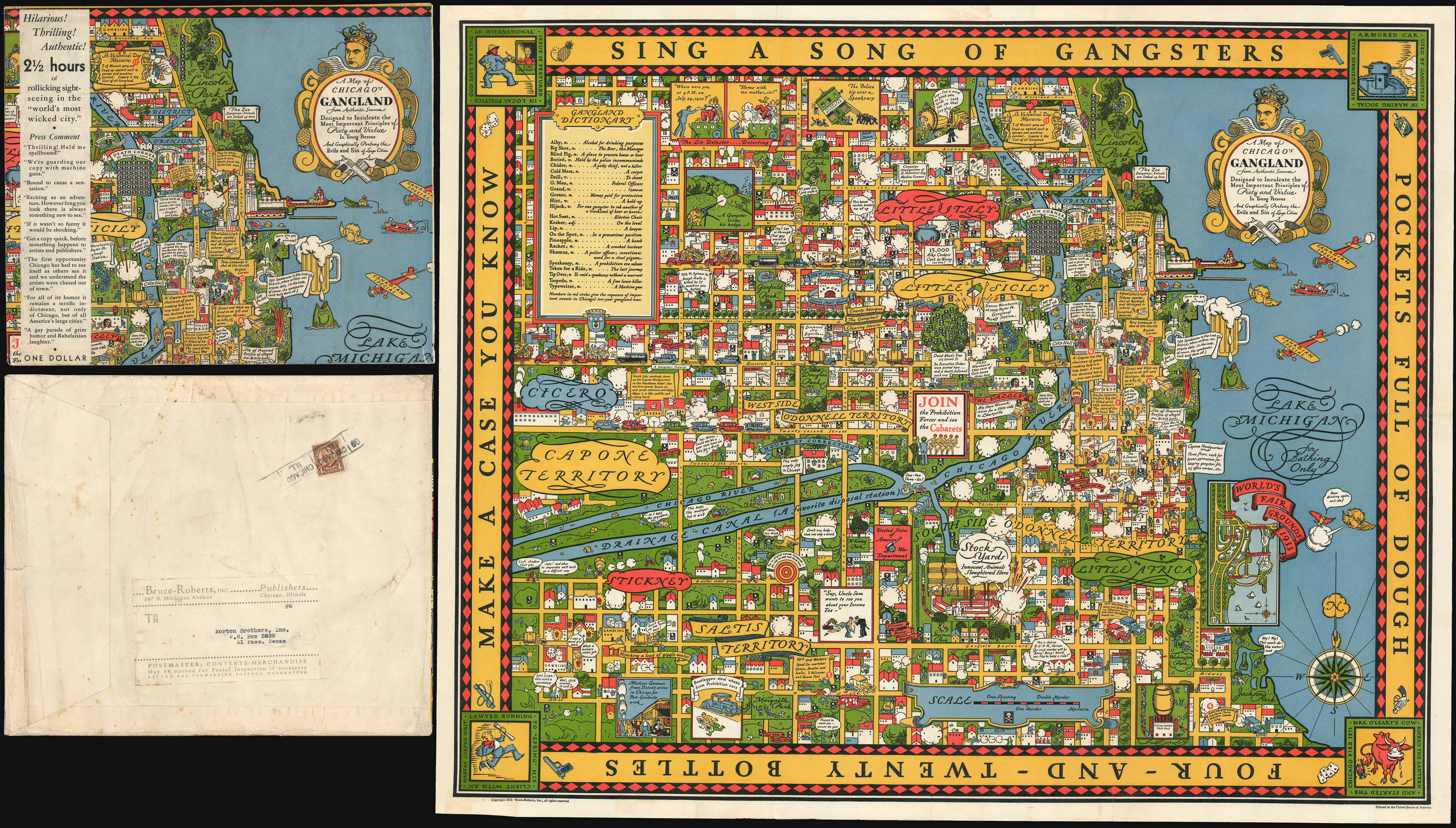
Gangland Chicago by Bruce Roberts, 1931

With the growth of tourism, pictorial mapmaking reappeared as a popular culture art form in the 1920s through the 1950s, often with a whimsical Art Deco style that reflects the period. Many of these maps were commissioned by commercial entities (banks, oil companies, &c.), and in many cases the artists (often draftsmen working for architecture firms) are not attributed. One of the early examples of the pictorial maps was published in the German arts magazine Das Plakat. These were the reproductions of two political cartoon maps of Europe which had been produced by Paul Hadol in 1870 and by Walter Trier. A number of such maps are still published (originals going for hundreds or thousands of dollars today). Among the best-known maps of this era today are the 1926 Manhattan map of C. V. Farrow, and the Western maps of Jo Mora.

Another resurgence occurred in the 1970s and 80s. This was the heyday of companies like Archar and Descartes who produced hundreds of colorful promotional maps of mainly American and Canadian cities. Local businesses were flatteringly drawn on these "character maps" with their logos proudly embedded on their buildings.

== Pictorial map-makers up to modern times ==
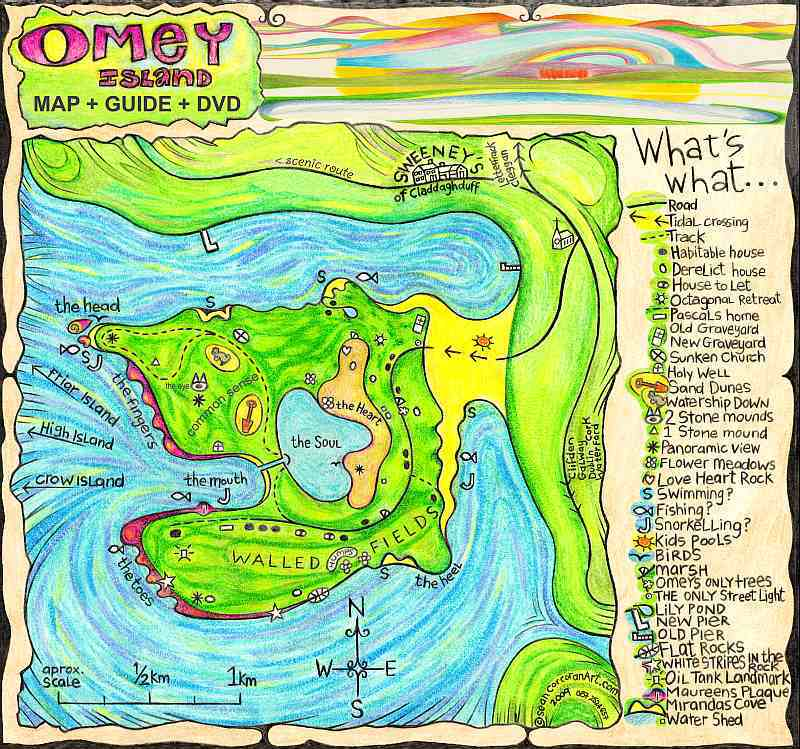
Colorful quirky map of Omey Island created by Irish artist Sean Corcoran, 2009

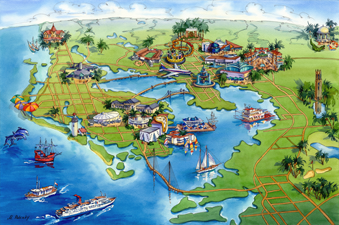
Tampa Bay aerial view map by Maria Rabinky, 2008

Many mapmakers traveled from city to city enlisting the support of local merchants, industrialists and civic organizations, whose endorsement would of course guarantee a prominent place for their properties on the map.

For example, Edwin Whitefield would require about 200 subscribers before he put pen to paper. Once he secured the profitability of the venture, Whitefield would be seen all over town sketching buildings. After choosing an imaginary aerial vantage point, he would then integrate all his sketches into a complete and detailed drawing of the city.

Jean-Louis Rheault, a contemporary pictorial map illustrator, said, "Pictorial maps - with their emphasis on what's important and eye-catching - make it easier to figure out what's where."

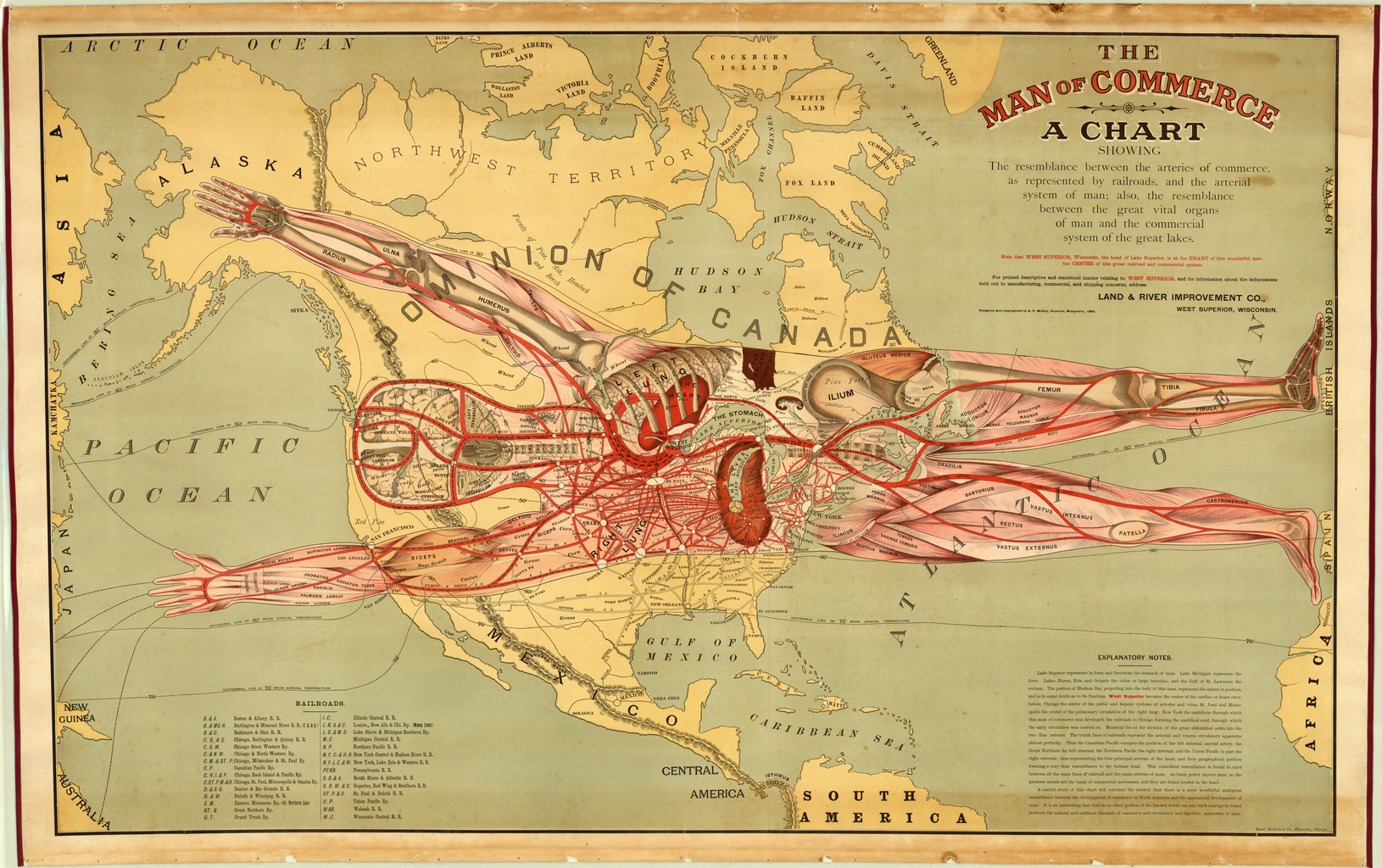
The Man of Commerce, 1889, Rand McNally and Company

== Anthropomorphic maps ==
A type of pictorial maps are maps that use anthropomorphic images. Anthropomorphic maps date back to when Sebastian Münster used a queen to depict Europe in 1570. The map, The Man of Commerce, by Augustus F. McKay is the earliest anthropomorphic map known of in the United States, created in 1889.

== See also ==
- Aerial photography – Taking images of the ground from the air
- Animated mapping – Application of animation to add a temporal component to a map displaying change
- Bird's-eye view – Elevated view of an object or location from above
- British Cartographic Society
- Cartogram – Map distorting size to show another value
- Terrain cartography, also known as Cartographic relief depiction – Representation of surface shape on maps
- Cartographic generalization – Reduction of information complexity on maps
- Contour line – Curve along which a 3D surface is at equal elevation
- Critical cartography – Mapping practices and methods of analysis grounded in critical theory
- Digital Cadastral DataBase
- Fantasy map – Study and creation of maps of imagined places or events
- Figure-ground in map design – Focus of attention on features in a map
- Four color theorem – Planar maps require at most four colors
- Gazetteer – Geographical dictionary or directory used in conjunction with a map or atlas
- Geocode – Code that represents a geographic entity (location or object)
- Geographic Information System – System to capture, manage, and present geographic data (GIS)
- Geovisualization – Visualization of geospatial data
- Here be dragons – Phrase used on maps to indicate uncharted areas
- Isostasy – State of gravitational equilibrium between Earth's crust and mantle
- List of Japanese map symbols
- List of cartographers
- Locator map – Map showing the location of a geographic area in context
- Map projection – Systematic representation of the surface of a sphere or ellipsoid onto a plane
- National Geospatial-Intelligence Agency – US DoD division
- OpenStreetMap – Collaborative map database, a free project mapping the world's roads using GPS
- Orthophoto – Geometrically corrected aerial photograph
- Planetary cartography – Cartography of solid objects outside of the Earth
- Point of beginning – Surveyor's mark at the start of a wide-scale survey
- Sea level – Geographical reference point from which various heights are measured
- Terra incognita – "Unknown land", area not mapped by cartographers
