= The Grove (Jefferson, Texas) =

Historic house in Texas, United States

- Stilley–Young House
- U.S. National Register of Historic Places
- Recorded Texas Historic Landmark
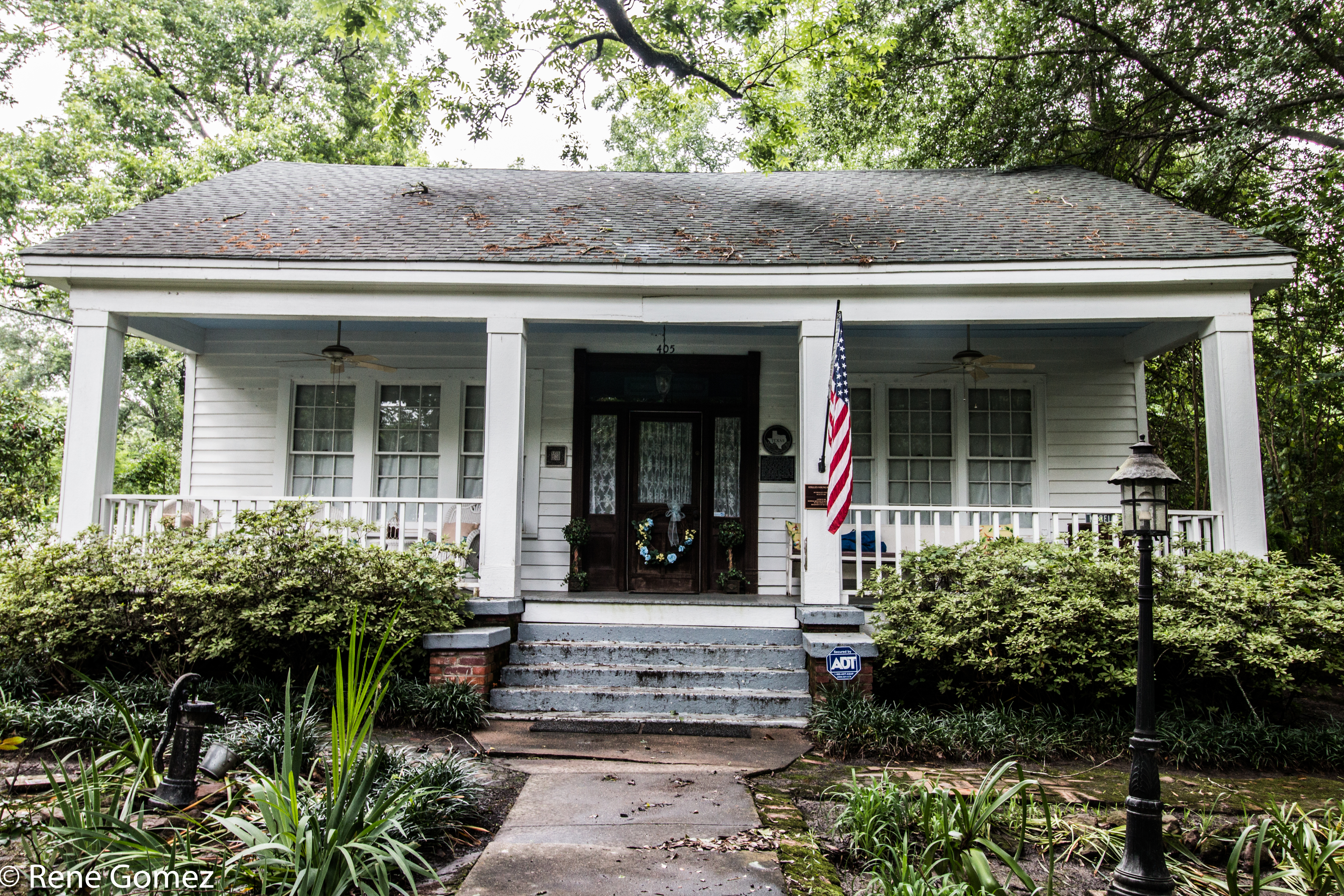
- The Grove (Stilley-Young House)

- Location within Texas Location within the United States
- Location: 405 Moseley St., Jefferson, Texas
- Coordinates: 32°45′22″N 94°21′5″W
- Area: 0.5 acres (0.20 ha)
- Built: 1861
- Architectural style: Greek Revival
- Website: The Grove-Jefferson, Texas
- NRHP reference No.: 05001105
- RTHL No.: 13675

Significant dates
- Added to NRHP: September 28, 2005
- Designated RTHL: 2006

The Grove (also known as the Stilley–Young House), located in Jefferson, Texas, is an 1861 historic home that is listed on the National Register of Historic Places, and is a Recorded Texas Historic Landmark. The house has also been called the most haunted place in Texas. The Grove's history dates back to the 19th century, when the property was purchased and the house that became known as "The Grove" was built. The Grove has been featured in the television series If Walls Could Talk on cable channel HGTV and was chosen "as one of the top twelve most haunted houses in America" by This Old House. The Grove was also named as one of the "eight scariest places in Texas" by Texas Monthly magazine. The house was also shown in William Shatner's Weird or What? in 2012. Additionally, The Grove was featured on Penn & Teller: Bullshit! Texas Highways magazine has featured The Grove several times, including in articles "Haunted Places in Texas" from October 1997 and "Haunted Jefferson" from October 2008.

== Architecture ==
The structure exhibits many of the external features of a Greek Revival home, but closer inspection reveals the influence of Creole Architecture as well. The Grove is a one-story building constructed of wood – the beams and studs are cypress, covered with wooden lap siding. The house was built in 1861, and is a blending of two architectural styles: Greek Revival and French Creole. The unusual melding of these styles presumably comes from the fact that many historic homes in the surrounding neighborhood were built in Greek Revival style at the time, but since the original owner, Frank Stilley, was from Louisiana, he exerted a French Creole Architectural influence into the design. Because of the city of Jefferson's ties to riverboat trade with Louisiana during the 1800s, it stands as a unique example of the region's past.

No contemporary owners have attempted to "modernize" or "renovate" the structure of The Grove. The house today appears as it did after the 1930s remodeling, which made very few external modifications. By preserving the heritage and history of the house, it is hoped that The Grove will be a significant reminder of the region's past for our future generations.

== History ==
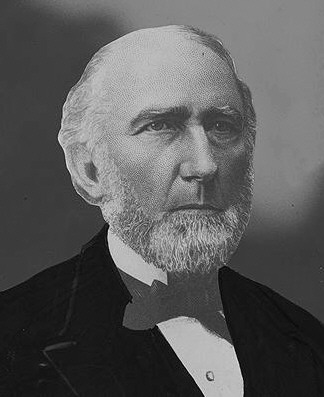
Amos Morrill

The land was originally given to Daniel and Lucy Alley, co-founders of Jefferson, in a land grant. On June 9, 1847, Amos Morrill, a lawyer and the first federal judge of Texas, purchased the property and built a log cabin there, where he lived while staying in Jefferson while traveling for his judiciary duties. Harriet Potter, common-law wife of the deceased Robert Potter, sought Morrill's representation in Jefferson for her case against her husband's estate. This was one of the first cases for women's rights in Texas. Amos Morrill sold the property to Caleb Ragin and his wife Sarah on March 20, 1855. On November 13, 1861, Frank Stilley and Minerva Fox, Stilley's wife, purchased the land and built a house there, called The Grove.

=== Ownership by the Stilley Family ===
W. Frank Stilley was a Cotton Factor in Jefferson, Texas, and he married Minerva Fox, one of the daughters of the Fox Plantation in Marshall, Texas in 1860. Construction was started on a new home for the newlywed couple, paid for by the bride's father as a wedding gift. The home was completed in 1861, and the young couple moved in to start their lives together. Between 1870 and 1880 Minerva and Frank encountered some bad luck. First a flood destroyed Frank Stilley's cotton brokering business. Mr. Stilley began to rebuild his business but by 1873, "The U.S. Army Corps of Engineers removed the Great Raft from the Red River... dropping the water level in Big Cypress Bayou [bayou adjacent to Jefferson, Texas] to a point that shipping was uncertain and no longer financially profitable". This hurt Mr. Stilley's cotton business. In 1879, Minerva Fox Stilley died. After burying her in Oakwood Cemetery (Jefferson, Texas), Frank moved further west and settled in Weatherford, Texas, putting The Grove up for sale.

==== Stockade Case ====
According to the Handbook of Texas, during Reconstruction, a violent event known as the Stockade Case occurred; this case gave The Grove the reputation of being one of the most haunted sites in America. The Stockade Case began when "a northern carpetbagger George W. Smith arrived in Jefferson with four freed slaves and quickly made enemies by saying that ex-slaves wouldn't be free until Jefferson burnt".

The citizens of Jefferson became outraged after Smith's speech and threatened his life. To help protect Smith, the Union Army placed Smith and his acquaintances in the public jail on Lafayette Street (a few blocks from the Grove) where they would be safe for the rest of their stay in Jefferson, Texas. That night, a mob full of angry locals gathered around the jail, where they "disarmed the Union troops, entered the jail, took the carpetbagger George W. Smith out, and shot him. The brutal act was completed when they took the four black men and either shot or hanged them along Moseley Street". The military court records show the Grove as being one of the sites where the incident occurred.

=== Ownership by the Rock Family ===
The estate of Minerva Stilley, which oversaw the guardianship to the sons John R. Stilley and Frank F. Stilley, sold the Grove to Daniel C. Rock and his wife Amanda on February 1, 1880. The 1880 Census of Marion County gives the only clue to Daniel's identity, which is that he was a "bridge builder". One could certainly speculate that with the clearing of the "Great Raft", the depth and flow of all rivers in the area was affected, and this might be a lucrative profession at the time as rivers raised or fell to new levels.

=== Ownership by the Burks Family ===
The Rock family must have decided to move, because they sold the property in 1882 to Mr. T.C. Burks, but the property was returned within six months. There is no explanation as to why the Burks reneged on the deal, only that they did not wish to live there anymore. The Burks relocated to Athens, Texas.

Daniel and Amanda took back The Grove, and lived there another three years. In 1885, the Rocks moved to Paris, Texas, in Lamar County. While there is no indication as to the reason for their move, one might speculate that because of his profession, the bridge-building work may have dried up. The Great Raft of the Red River had been cleared by Captain Shreve and his crews, and the Big Cypress Bayou that allowed the steamships to service Jefferson had fallen in depth significantly. Daniel's work in the area was probably done, and he moved on to find opportunity.

=== Ownership by the Charlie Young Family ===
Charlie Young

On March 6, 1885, Charles and Daphne Young purchased the Grove; they were an African-American couple that had been born into slavery as children. Charlie was born on the Sam Smith plantation near Clarksville, Texas. After the slaves were freed, Charlie moved to Jefferson with his mother, where he apprenticed as a barber. In 1908, the Young family experienced a tragedy when the son, James, committed suicide at the house – he hanged himself on the back porch. His body is not listed on the family marker in Cedar Grove cemetery in Jefferson with the rest of the family, so no one knows where James was buried. Charlie and Daphne lived at The Grove until their respective deaths in 1938 and 1955. When Charlie Young died, he left The Grove to his oldest daughter, Louise.

=== Ownership by Louise Young ===
Louise Young as a young woman.

Louise took over ownership of The Grove, where she lived and cared for her mother, Daphne. Daphne Young spent most of her life at the Grove where she took care of the gardens that she loved. After she died, her funeral was held at the Grove on the front porch, reportedly because "she could be near the garden that she loved so much one last time".

In the 1930s renovation of the home, however, Louise Young enclosed the back porch to make an indoor bathroom – so the bathroom of the house is therefore the place where her brother James took his life.

Louise, who the oldest daughter of the Youngs, lived her entire life at the Grove, except for the four years that she was away at Bishop College in Marshall, Texas earning a degree in teaching. "According to those who knew Louise, she was constantly frightened of something, since she had every interior door and window fitted with strong locks on them and installed strong lights to keep the yard lit". Also, according to Robert and Anne Powell Wlodarski, writers of A Texas Guide to Haunted Restaurants, Taverns and Inns, Louise was always worried about someone getting inside the house. She reportedly "called the police on a regular basis complaining about prowlers". Louise died in 1983 at age the age of 96, having lived her entire life at The Grove.

=== Ownership by the Grove Family ===
When Louise Young died, the property was purchased on November 9, 1983, by a couple named Colonel Daniel M. and Lucile Grove. Col. Grove was a retired military chaplain, and the pastor of the Mooringsport, Louisiana United Methodist Church. They started preparing the place for their retirement, since it had deteriorated somewhat. The roof needed replacing, there was damage to the porch, and the garden was hopelessly overgrown. The Groves had the land around the house bulldozed, and began moving some of their antiques into the small west bedroom, where she could lock them away until the couple could occupy the house full-time.

Tragedy struck before they could finish the house and move in, however. Colonel Grove was diagnosed with Binswanger's Disease, which is a rare form of dementia characterized by lesions in the brain. It is a terrible affliction, and Mrs. Grove was forced to put the house up for sale.

=== Ownership by Patrick Hopkins ===
Patrick Hopkins with the next owners of The Grove, Tami & Mitchel Whitington.

Lucile Grove sold the property to chef Patrick Hopkins on January 16, 1990. In her book "Best Tales of Texas Ghosts," Docia Schultz Williams gave an account of how Patrick Hopkins came to own The Grove. The account is told in Mr. Hopkins' own words: "One day in 1989 I received a call from Jefferson to my office at La Camarilla Resort, Scottsdale, Arizona, asking what it would take to bring me back to East Texas. My sister mentioned an idea we had both expressed back in 1976 on opening an old-house restaurant, hopefully in Jefferson. I flew back from Arizona and scouted the Jefferson and East Texas small towns looking for that 'just right' house. After making the usual circuit in Jefferson and seeing nothing new, I decided to return home and seeing Highway 59 in the distance, I thought that Moseley Street would lead right into it. Halfway down the street I saw a beautiful Greek Revival home almost covered with vines and underbrush, with a 'For Sale' sign on it."

Patrick J. Hopkins and his sister, Mrs. Mary Hopkins Callas began repair and restoration of the house in order to open it as a restaurant. The pair are the children of Frank S. Hopkins and Miss Joan H. Wyland, who were married at the Immaculate Conception church in Jefferson. The Grove opened as a restaurant with a delectable menu, along with specialty nights such as dinner theaters and an annual celebration of Thomas Jefferson's birthday.

The restaurant garnered rave reviews: "For me, the charm of this old riverport is the pecan cheesecake that Chef Patrick Hopkins concocts in The Grove" - Kent Biffle, Dallas Morning News; "I almost forgot I was in a restaurant. It feels more like I'm visiting friends here" - Kilgore News Herald; "The Grove is a great addition to the Jefferson scene. Such a delicious dinner, and delightful evening" - Connie Sherley, Author, "A Visitor's Guide to Texas"; "Wonderful food! Great service!" - Reg Durant, Marshall News Messenger.

The Grove would remain a restaurant for several years until Mr. Hopkins finally closed it.

=== Recent history ===
The current owners, Mitchel and Tami Whitington, purchased the house in 2002. Mitchel is an author and also works in the publishing industry, and Tami is an educator who is currently the English Department Chair at Jefferson High School. They discovered the house during a visit to Jefferson.

In 2006, the Texas Historical Commission awarded The Grove (a.k.a. The Stilley-Young House) the distinction of a Recorded Texas Historic Landmark, marker #13675.

== The ghosts ==
The Grove has a vibrant history of unexplained happenings: voices, sounds of footsteps, moving objects, and other ghostly phenomena. These stories indicate that the Grove is the most haunted building in Jefferson, and perhaps the most haunted site in Texas. According to Hopkins, the previous owner who turned the Grove into a restaurant, many mysterious events occurred while he was at the house. These events include mirrors falling off walls, loud wails heard coming from the upstairs, unexplained moisture in spots around the house, and the constant feeling of being watched. "Legend has it that the property lies in an area where several murders occurred, and several unmarked graves reportedly lie under or near the house". Hopkins's niece and her friends recall seeing a black man lying in the street, and as they went to see if he needed help, the man supposedly disappeared. This black man could be one of the men from the Stockade Case or another man that was rumored to have been hanged on the back porch of the house.

A ghostly woman has also been reported many times being around the Grove. She was spotted in the house by Hopkins right before he was opening up the restaurant. The woman has also been reported by a neighbor and her sister, who saw a "glowing white figure" on the porch. This woman has been said to be the original owner, Minerva Fox Stilley. She has often been seen walking beside the house, and then stepping up through a wall of the house. On the inside, she emerges from the wall and then walks across the width of the house. This strange path makes more sense when one considers that the wall that she steps up through was once the back porch to the house before the 1870 addition was made. Instead of stepping up through a wall, she instead is probably stepping up onto the back porch, coming through a door that was at the back of the house, and walking across to what would have been the children's bedroom.

== See also ==
- National Register of Historic Places listings in Marion County, Texas
- Recorded Texas Historic Landmarks in Marion County
