= John Charles Watrous =

American judge

Judge of the United States District Court for the Eastern District of Texas
- In office February 21, 1857 – April 19, 1870
- Appointed by: operation of law
- Preceded by: Seat established by 11 Stat. 164
- Succeeded by: Joel C. C. Winch

Judge of the United States District Court for the District of Texas
- In office May 29, 1846 – February 21, 1857
- Appointed by: James K. Polk
- Preceded by: Seat established by 9 Stat. 1
- Succeeded by: Seat abolished

Member of the Mississippi House of Representatives
- In office 1837

Personal details
- Born: John Charles Watrous; August 1, 1801 Colchester, Connecticut, U.S.
- Died: June 17, 1874 (aged 72)
- Education: Union College (A.B.) read law

John Charles Watrous (August 1, 1801 – June 17, 1874) was a United States district judge of the United States District Court for the District of Texas and the United States District Court for the Eastern District of Texas.

== Education and career ==
Born on August 1, 1801, in Colchester, Connecticut, Watrous received an Artium Baccalaureus degree in 1828 from Union College and read law in 1830. Watrous entered private practice in Selma, Alabama from 1830 to 1835. He continued private practice in Woodville, Mississippi from 1835 to 1836. He was a member of the Mississippi House of Representatives in 1837. He resumed private practice in the Republic of Texas from 1837 to 1838. He was Attorney General of the Republic of Texas from 1838 to 1839. He resumed private practice in Galveston, Republic of Texas (State of Texas from December 29, 1845) from 1839 to 1845.

== Federal judicial service ==
Watrous was nominated by President James K. Polk on May 27, 1846, to the United States District Court for the District of Texas, to a new seat authorized by 9 Stat. 1. He was confirmed by the United States Senate on May 29, 1846, and received his commission the same day. Watrous was reassigned by operation of law to the United States District Court for the Eastern District of Texas on February 21, 1857, to a new seat authorized by 11 Stat. 164. His service terminated on April 19, 1870, due to his resignation, because he was stricken with paralysis.

=== Criticism and impeachment attempts ===
After his appointment to the federal bench, Watrous became the object of severe criticism, in part because his decisions in a number of cases went against the wishes of some members of the legislature and because of his personal connections with land speculation in the state. The alleged relation of Watrous to an attempt to validate forged land certificates resulted in the Texas legislature's passing a resolution in 1848 asking the judge to resign. Impeachment proceedings against him began in the United States House of Representatives in January 1851 with the presentation of three petitions or memorials. The main charges against him were violating Texas statutes punishing those dealing in fraudulent land certificates, misusing his judicial influence, and holding sessions of court improperly. After numerous investigations the case was dropped by a vote of 111 to 97 on December 15, 1858. Complaints continued to be presented to each succeeding Congress; Sam Houston, on February 3, 1859, made a scathing attack on Watrous, and United States Representative Andrew J. Hamilton prosecuted the impeachment until the adjournment of Congress on March 3, 1861.

=== Civil War ===
Due to Texas' secession from the Union and the American Civil War, Watrous was unable to hold court from 1861 to 1865. He resumed holding court at the end of the war.

== Later career and death ==
Following his resignation from the federal bench, Watrous moved to Baltimore, Maryland, and practiced law as much as his health would permit. He died on June 17, 1874.

== Sources ==
Legal offices
Preceded by Seat established by 9 Stat. 1	Judge of the United States District Court for the District of Texas; 1846–1857	Succeeded by Seat abolished
Preceded by Seat established by 11 Stat. 164	Judge of the United States District Court for the Eastern District of Texas; 1857–1870	Succeeded by Joel C. C. Winch
