= Amos Morrill =

American judge

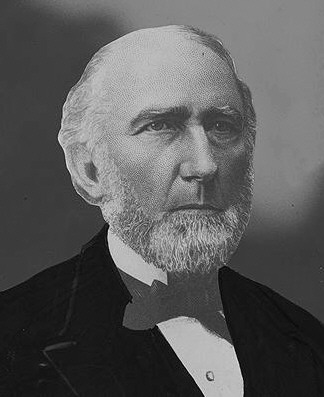

Judge of the United States District Court for the Eastern District of Texas
- In office February 5, 1872 – October 18, 1883
- Appointed by: Ulysses S. Grant
- Preceded by: Joel C. C. Winch
- Succeeded by: Chauncey Brewer Sabin

Personal details
- Born: Amos Morrill; August 25, 1809 Salisbury, Massachusetts, U.S.
- Died: March 5, 1884 (aged 74) Austin, Texas, U.S.
- Education: Bowdoin College read law

Amos Morrill (August 25, 1809 – March 5, 1884) was a United States district judge of the United States District Court for the Eastern District of Texas.

== Education and career ==
Born in Salisbury, Massachusetts, Morrill graduated from Bowdoin College in 1834 and read law to enter the bar in 1836. He was in private practice in Murfreesboro, Tennessee from 1836 to 1839, in Clarksville, Texas from 1839 to 1856, and in Austin, Texas from 1856 to 1868. On June 9, 1847, Amos Morrill purchased the property The Grove in Jefferson, Texas and built a log cabin there, which he used during his time in Jefferson. Morrill sold the property to Caleb Ragin and his wife Sarah on March 20, 1855. He was a justice of the Texas Supreme Court from 1868 to 1870, returning to private practice in Austin from 1870 to 1872.

== Federal judicial service ==
On January 18, 1872, Morrill was nominated by President Ulysses S. Grant to a seat on the United States District Court for the Eastern District of Texas vacated by Judge Joel C. C. Winch. Morrill was confirmed by the United States Senate on February 5, 1872, and received his commission the same day. He served in that capacity until his retirement, on October 18, 1883.

== Later career and death ==
After his retirement, Morill remained in private practice in Austin until he died there on March 5, 1884.

== Sources ==
Legal offices
Preceded by Joel C. C. Winch	Judge of the United States District Court for the Eastern District of Texas; 1872–1883	Succeeded by Chauncey Brewer Sabin
