= Herman Brosius =

American cartographer

- Born: 1851; Milwaukee, Wisconsin, U.S.
- Died: 1917 (aged 65–66)
- Occupation: Cartography

Herman Brosius (1851 - 1917) was an American cartographer who made panoramic maps that were printed at his twin brother Frederick Brosius' firm in Milwaukee, Wisconsin. His work is held in the collection of the Library and Archives Canada, Brock University, and the Museum of Wisconsin Art.

Brosius was born in Milwaukee, Wisconsin. His twin brother Frederick owned the Milwaukee Lithograph and Engraving Company and the brothers collaborated to produce dozens of panoramic maps. Brosius produced several views of Texas municipalities beginning with Jefferson, Texas in 1872

His earliest map was of Darlington, Wisconsin. During his career, he also produced views of Canadian cities including Ontario and Ottawa.

Brosius died in Milwaukee.

== Gallery ==
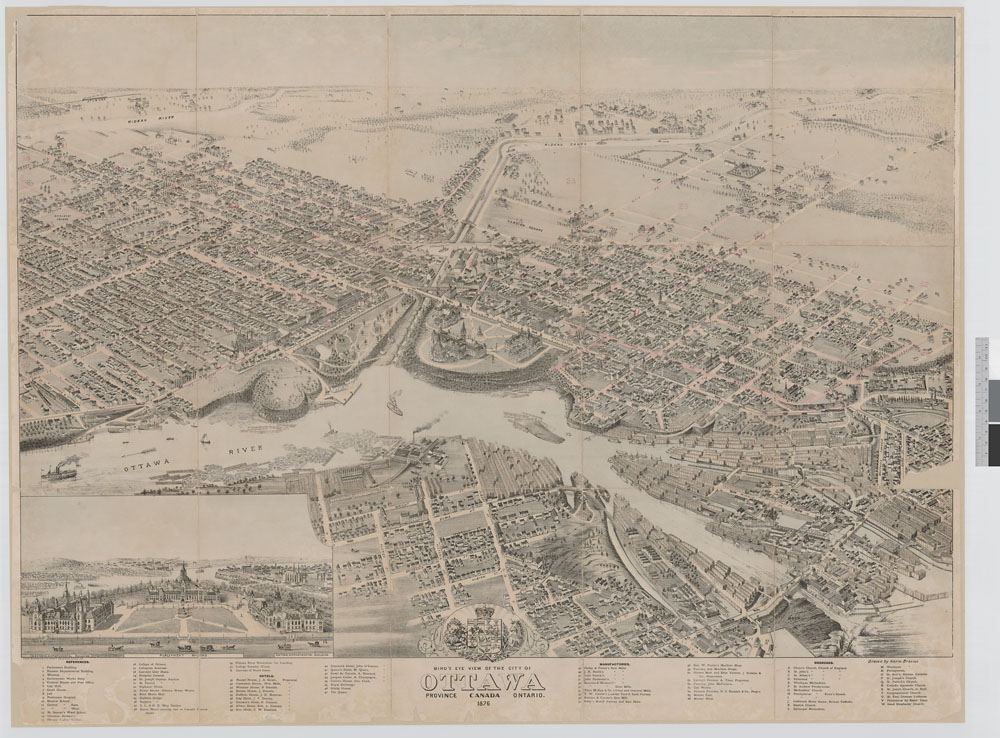
Ottawa, Canada 1876

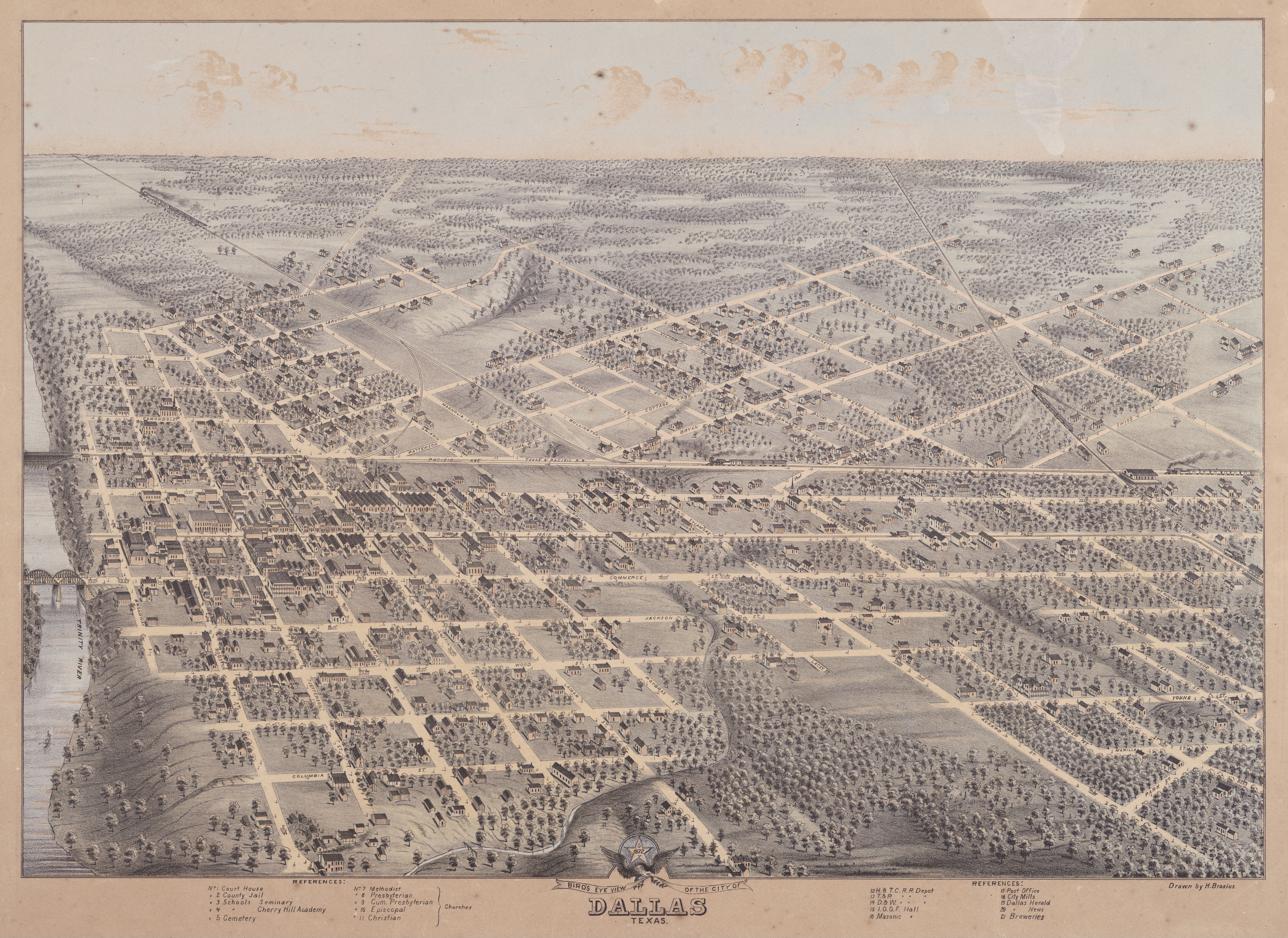
Dallas, Texas 1872

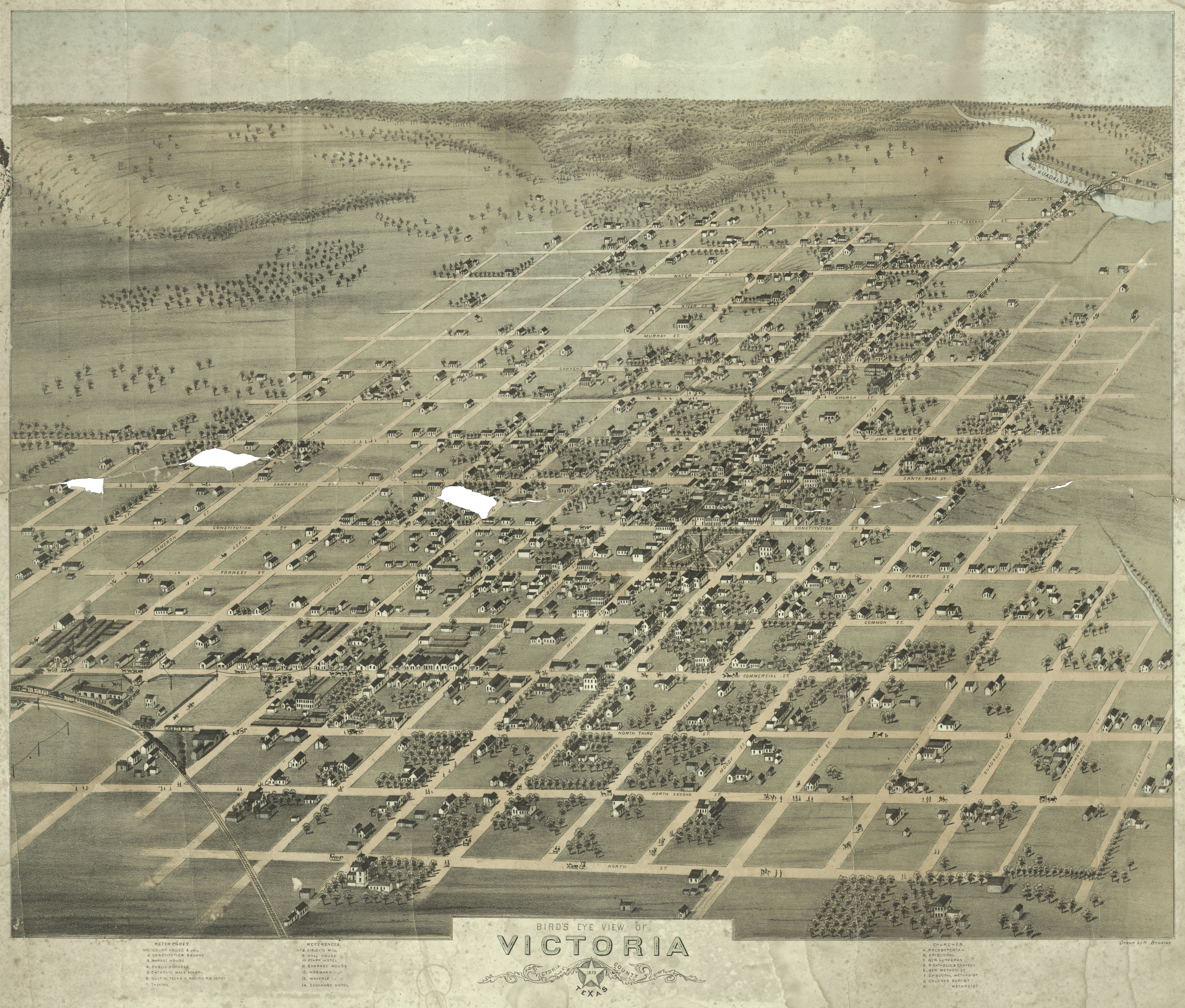
Victoria, Texas 1873

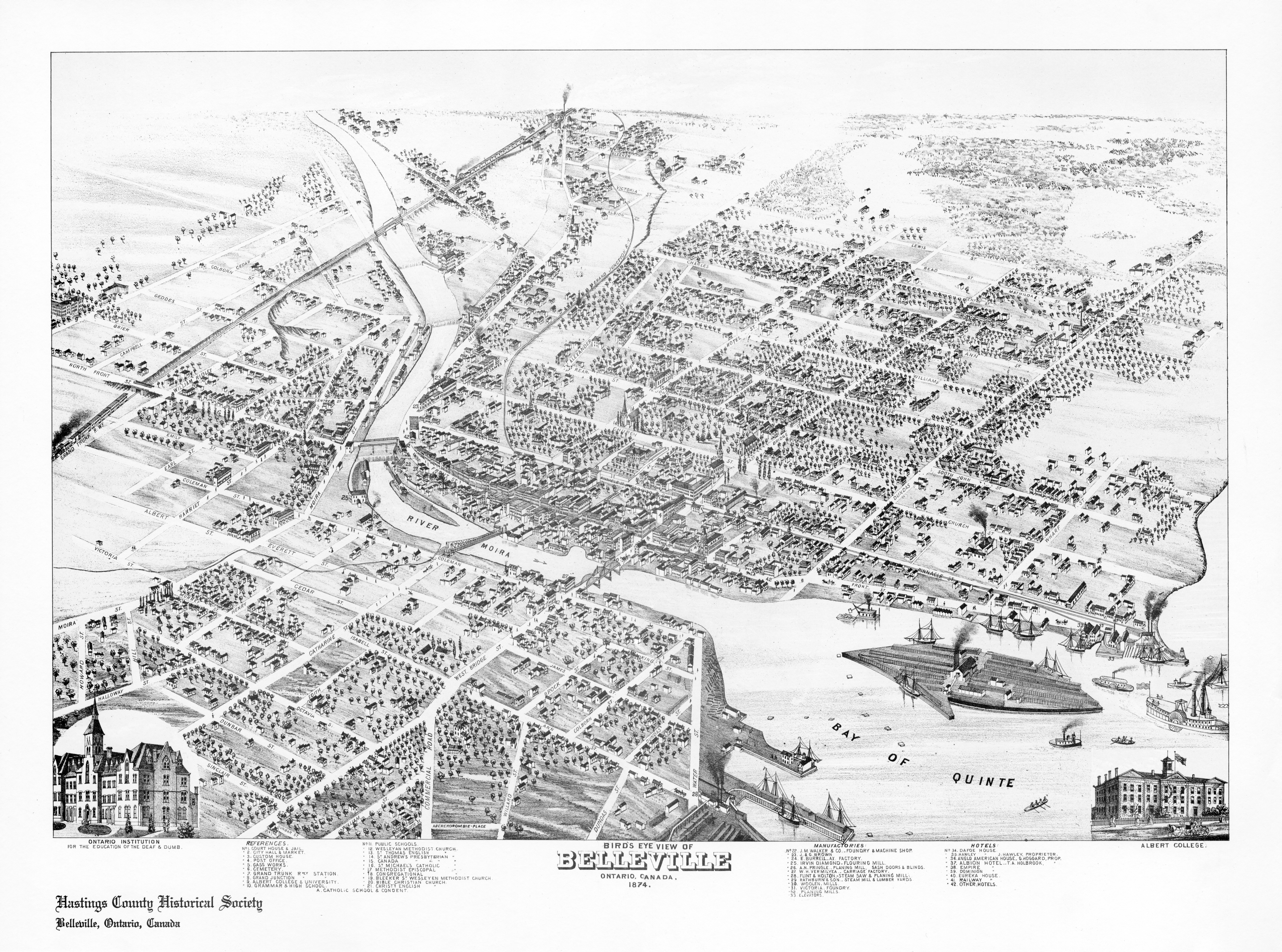
Belleville, Ontario, Canada 1874

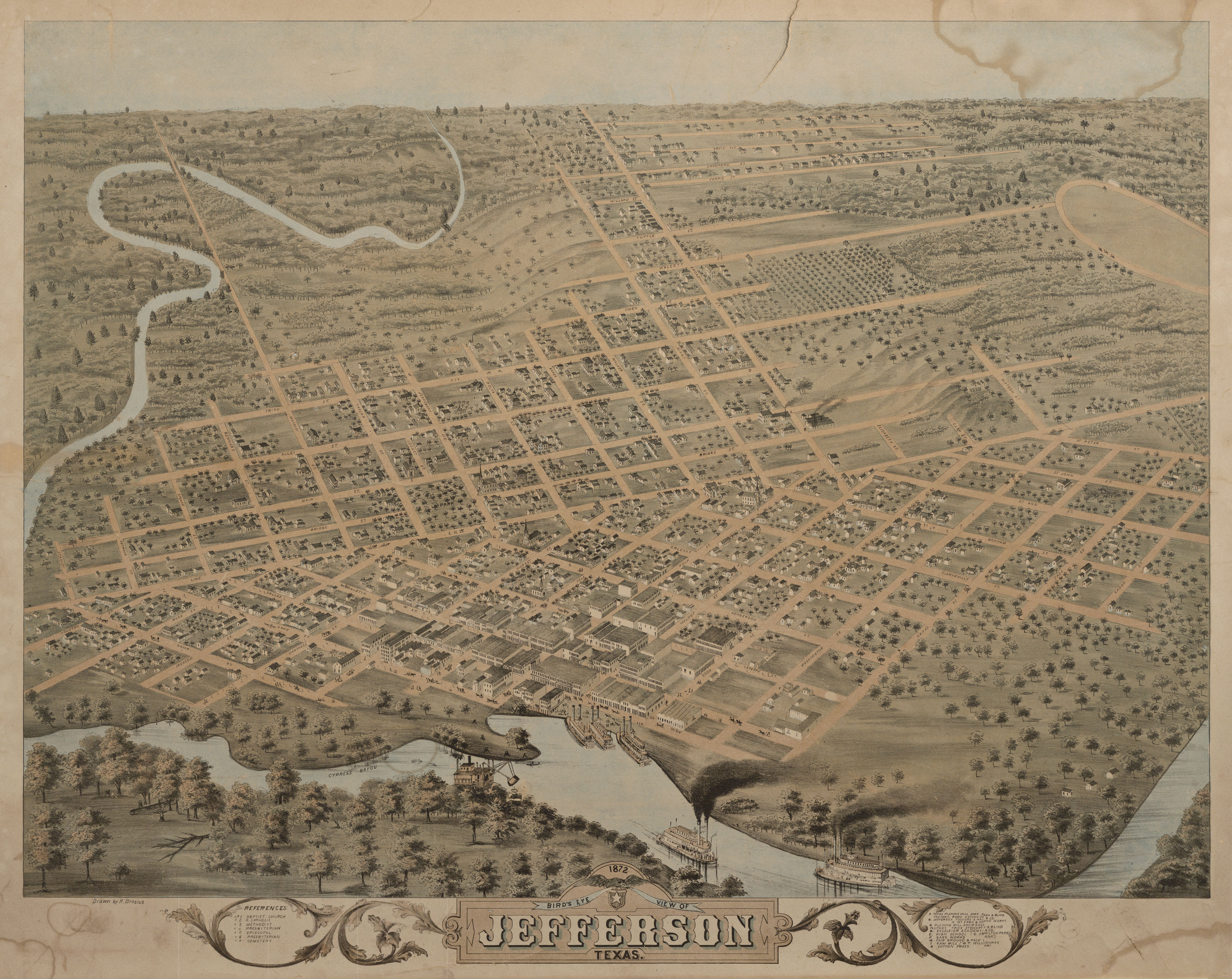
Jefferson, Texas 1872
