= Jefferson Independent School District =

School district in Texas, United States

Jefferson Independent School District is a public school district based outside the city limit's of Jefferson, Texas.

In 2009, the school district was rated "academically acceptable" by the Texas Education Agency.

== Schools ==
- Jefferson High (Grades 9–12)
- Jefferson Junior High (Grades 5–8)
- Jefferson Elementary (Grades 1–4)
- Jefferson Primary (Grades PK-K)
