= Robert Schroeder =

Bob, Rob, or Robert Schroeder may refer to:

- Bob Schroeder (born 1960), American businessman, politician, and convicted felon
- Rob Schroeder (1926–2011), American racing driver
- Robert W. Schroeder III (born 1966), American federal judge

== See also ==
- Bob Schroder (born 1944), American baseball player
