= Texas's 62nd House of Representatives district =

American legislative district

Texas's 62nd State House of Representatives district
Representative
Shelley Luther; R–Sherman
- Demographics: 71.9% White; 7.2% Black; 14.4% Hispanic; 1.7% Asian
- Population (2020) • Voting age: 186,794; 144,154

District 62 is a district of the Texas House of Representatives that serves all of Grayson, Franklin, Fannin, and Delta Counties. This district had its first representative in 1853. The current representative for District 62 is Republican Shelley Luther.

== Representatives ==
Leg.	Representative	Party	Term start	Term end	Counties represented
5th	Stephen Heard Darden	Unknown	November 7, 1853	November 5, 1855	Gonzales
6th	Stephen Heard Darden	Unknown	November 5, 1855	November 2, 1857	Gonzales
7th	Albert Nelson Mills	Unknown	November 2, 1875	November 7, 1859	Gonzales
8th	William Henry Stewart	Unknown	November 7, 1859	November 4, 1861	Gonzales
9th	William P. McLean	Unknown	November 4, 1861	January 7, 1862	Calhoun, DeWitt, Jackson, Victoria
9th	F.M. Taylor	Unknown	November 4, 1861	November 2, 1863	Calhoun, DeWitt, Jackson, Victoria
9th	Jacob B. Reid	Unknown	February 2, 1863	November 2, 1863	Calhoun, DeWitt, Jackson, Victoria
10th	Jacob B. Reid	Unknown	November 2, 1863	August 6, 1866	Calhoun, DeWitt, Jackson, Victoria
10th	William M. Cook	Unknown	November 2, 1863	August 6, 1866	Calhoun, DeWitt, Jackson, Victoria
11th	Truman Phelps	Unknown	August 6, 1866	February 7, 1870	Calhoun, DeWitt, Jackson, Victoria
11th	James M. Baker	Unknown	September 6, 1866	February 7, 1870	Calhoun, DeWitt, Jackson, Victoria
15th	Oliver H.P. McGinnis	Democratic	April 18, 1876	January 14, 1879	Bastrop
16th	Benjamin Franklin Jones	Unaffiliated	January 14, 1879	January 11, 1881	Bastrop
17th	Robert A. Kerr	Greenback Party	January 11, 1881	January 9, 1883	Bastrop
18th	Lafayette Lumpkin Foster	Democratic	January 9, 1883	January 13, 1885	Falls Limestone McLennan
19th	Lafayette Lumpkin Foster	Democratic	January 13, 1885	January 11, 1887	Falls Limestone McLennan
20th	Albert Collins Prendergast	Democratic	January 11, 1887	January 8, 1889	Falls Limestone McLennan
21st	William Abraham Kincaid	Democratic	January 8, 1889	January 13, 1891	Falls Limestone McLennan
22nd	Francis Marion Sellers	Democratic	January 13, 1891	January 10, 1893	Falls Limestone McLennan
23rd	Thomas Stalworth Henderson	Democratic	January 10, 1893	January 8, 1895	Milam
24th	H.F. Smith	Democratic	January 8, 1895	January 12, 1897	Milam
25th	Nathaniel Hardcastle Tracy	Democratic	January 12, 1897	January 10, 1899	Milam
26th	Oscar Fides McAnally	Democratic	January 10, 1899	January 8, 1901	Milam
27th	Oscar Fides McAnally	Democratic	January 8, 1901	January 13, 1903	Milam
28th	William F. Robertson	Democratic	January 13, 1903	January 10, 1905	Williamson
29th	Samuel David Davis	Democratic	January 10, 1905	January 8, 1907	Williamson
30th	Samuel David Davis	Democratic	January 8, 1907	January 12, 1909	Williamson
31st	W.S. Brookshire	Democratic	January 12, 1909	January 10, 1911	Williamson
32nd	W.S. Brookshire	Democratic	January 10, 1911	January 14, 1913	Williamson
33rd	M. C. Fields	Democratic	January 14, 1913	August 30, 1913	Falls
33rd	James Millard Kennedy	Democratic	September 9, 1914	January 12, 1915	Falls
34th	Julius Rector	Democratic	January 12, 1915	January 9, 1917	Falls
35th	Charles Barrett Monday	Democratic	January 9, 1917	January 14, 1919	Falls
36th	E. H. Childers	Democratic	January 14, 1919	January 11, 1921	Falls
37th	E. H. Childers	Democratic	January 11, 1921	January 9, 1923	Falls
38th	Andrew Connolly Dunn	Democratic	January 9, 1923	January 13, 1925	Falls
39th	Andrew Connolly Dunn	Democratic	January 13, 1925	January 11, 1927	Falls
40th	Joseph Charles Kennedy	Democratic	January 11, 1927	January 8, 1929	Falls
41st	Joseph Charles Kennedy	Democratic	January 8, 1929	January 13, 1931	Falls
42nd	Joseph Charles Kennedy	Democratic	January 13, 1931	January 10, 1933	Falls
43rd	William Elias Hodges	Democratic	January 10, 1933	January 8, 1935	Falls
44th	William Elias Hodges	Democratic	January 8, 1935	January 12, 1937	Falls
45th	Albert L. Derden	Democratic	January 12, 1937	January 10, 1939	Falls
46th	Albert L. Derden	Democratic	January 10, 1939	January 14, 1941	Falls
47th	Warren H. Henderson	Democratic	January 14, 1941	January 12, 1943	Falls
48th	Luman A. Parton	Democratic	January 12, 1943	January 9, 1945	Falls
49th	Luman A. Parton	Democratic	January 9, 1945	January 14, 1947	Falls
50th	Frank Calvert Oltorf	Democratic	January 14, 1947	January 11, 1949	Falls
51st	Frank Calvert Oltorf	Democratic	January 11, 1949	January 9, 1951	Falls
52nd	William Earl Osborn	Democratic	January 9, 1951	January 13, 1953	Falls
53rd	Wilbur Wright Perry	Democratic	January 13, 1953	January 11, 1955	Bosque Coryell Erath Hamilton
54th	James W. "Bill" Shannon	Democratic	January 11, 1955	January 8, 1957	Bosque Coryell Erath Hamilton
55th	James W. "Bill" Shannon	Democratic	January 8, 1957	January 13, 1959	Bosque Coryell Erath Hamilton
56th	Harold Adair Leaverton	Democratic	January 13, 1959	January 10, 1961	Bosque Coryell Erath Hamilton
57th	Harold Adair Leaverton	Democratic	January 10, 1961	January 8, 1963	Bosque Coryell Erath Hamilton
58th	James Madison Cotten	Democratic	January 8, 1963	January 12, 1965	Hood, Parker, Wise
59th	Thomas Howard Holmes Jr.	Democratic	January 12, 1965	January 10, 1967	Hood, Parker, Wise
63rd	Frank Calhoun	Democratic	January 9, 1973	January 14, 1975	Taylor
64th	David Stubbeman	Democratic	January 14, 1975	January 11, 1977	Taylor
65th	David Stubbeman	Democratic	January 11, 1977	January 9, 1979	Taylor
66th	Gary Eugene Thompson	Democratic	January 9, 1979	January 13, 1981	Taylor
67th	Gary Eugene Thompson	Democratic	January 13, 1981	January 11, 1983	Taylor
68th	Robert Grammar Bush III	Democratic	January 11, 1983	January 8, 1985	Collin, Grayson
69th	Robert Grammar Bush III	Democratic	January 8, 1985	January 13, 1987	Collin, Grayson
70th	Curtis Lee Seidlits Jr.	Democratic	January 13, 1987	January 10, 1989	Collin, Grayson
71st	Curtis Lee Seidlits Jr.	Democratic	January 10, 1989	January 8, 1991	Collin, Grayson
72nd	Curtis Lee Seidlits Jr.	Democratic	January 8, 1991	January 12, 1993	Collin, Grayson
73rd	Curtis Lee Seidlits Jr.	Democratic	January 12, 1993	January 10, 1995	Cooke, Grayson
74th	Curtis Lee Seidlits Jr.	Democratic	January 10, 1995	February 3, 1996	Cooke, Grayson
74th	Roger D. Sanders	Democratic	May 17, 1996	January 14, 1997	Cooke, Grayson
75th	Ron Clark	Republican	January 14, 1997	January 12, 1999	Cooke, Grayson
76th	Ron Clark	Republican	January 12, 1999	January 9, 2001	Cooke, Grayson
77th	Ron Clark	Republican	January 9, 2001	November 21, 2002	Cooke, Grayson
78th	Larry Phillips	Republican	January 14, 2003	January 11, 2005	Fannin, Grayson
79th	Larry Phillips	Republican	January 11, 2005	January 9, 2007	Fannin, Grayson
80th	Larry Phillips	Republican	January 9, 2007	January 13, 2009	Fannin, Grayson
81st	Larry Phillips	Republican	January 13, 2009	January 11, 2011	Fannin, Grayson
82nd	Larry Phillips	Republican	January 11, 2011	January 8, 2013	Fannin, Grayson
83rd	Larry Phillips	Republican	January 8, 2013	January 13, 2015	Delta, Fannin, Grayson
84th	Larry Phillips	Republican	January 13, 2015	January 10, 2017	Delta, Fannin, Grayson
85th	Larry Phillips	Republican	January 10, 2017	April 30, 2018	Delta, Fannin, Grayson
86th	Reggie Smith	Republican	January 8, 2019	Present	Delta, Fannin, Grayson
87th	Reggie Smith	Republican	January 12, 2021	Present	Delta, Fannin, Grayson
88th	TBD	TBD	2023	2025	Delta, Fannin, Grayson, Franklin
