= 321st Civil Affairs Brigade =

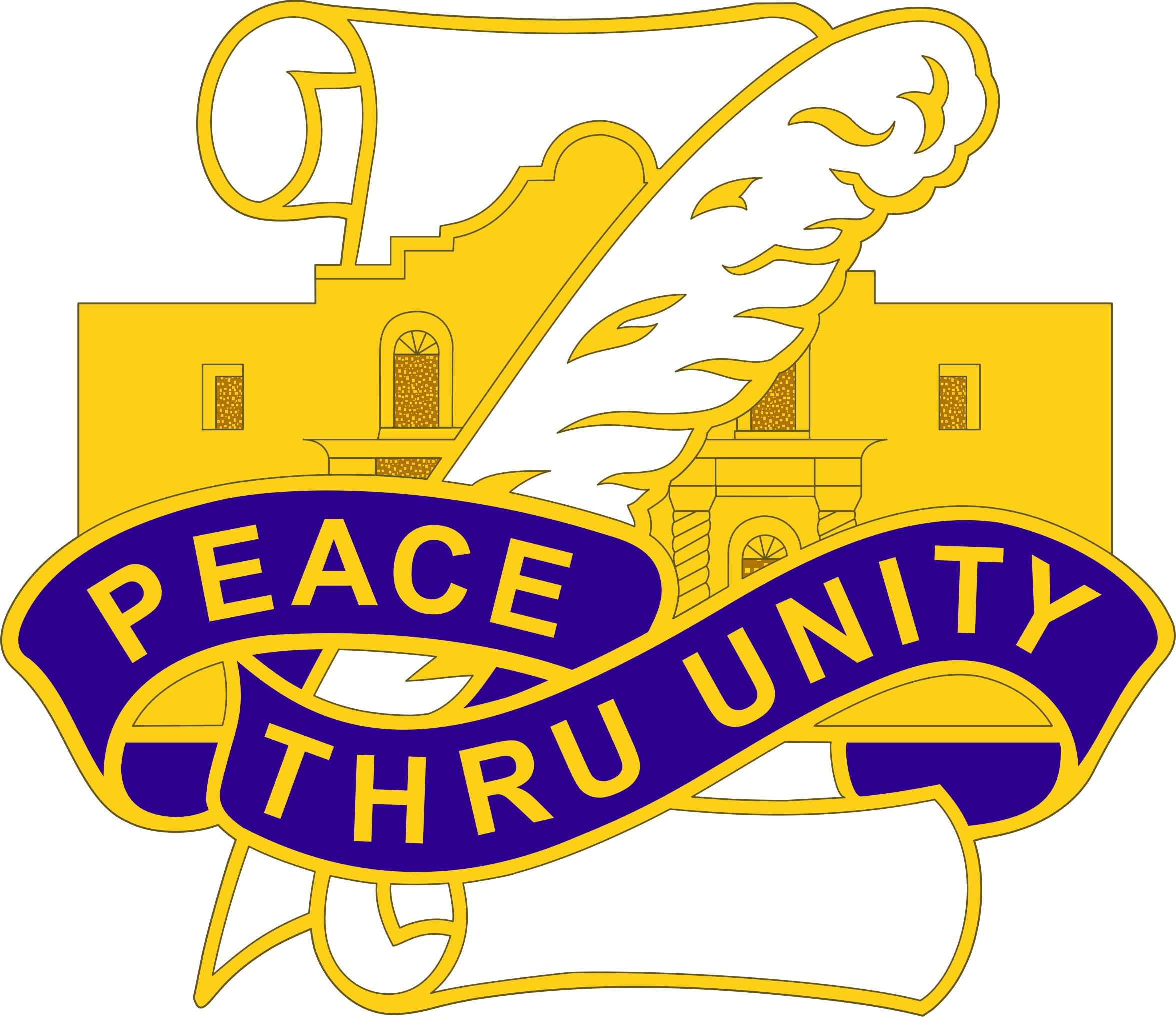
- 321st Civil Affairs Brigade Distinctive Unit Insignia
- Active: 1949—present
- Country: United States
- Branch: United States Army Reserve
- Role: Civil Affairs
- Size: Brigade
- Part of: 350th Civil Affairs Command of the U.S. Army Civil Affairs and Psychological Operations Command (USACAPOC)
- Garrison/HQ: Joint Base San Antonio, San Antonio, Texas
- Motto: Peace Thru Unity
- Website: https://www.facebook.com/321CABrigade/

Commanders
- Current commander: COL John McGowan

Insignia
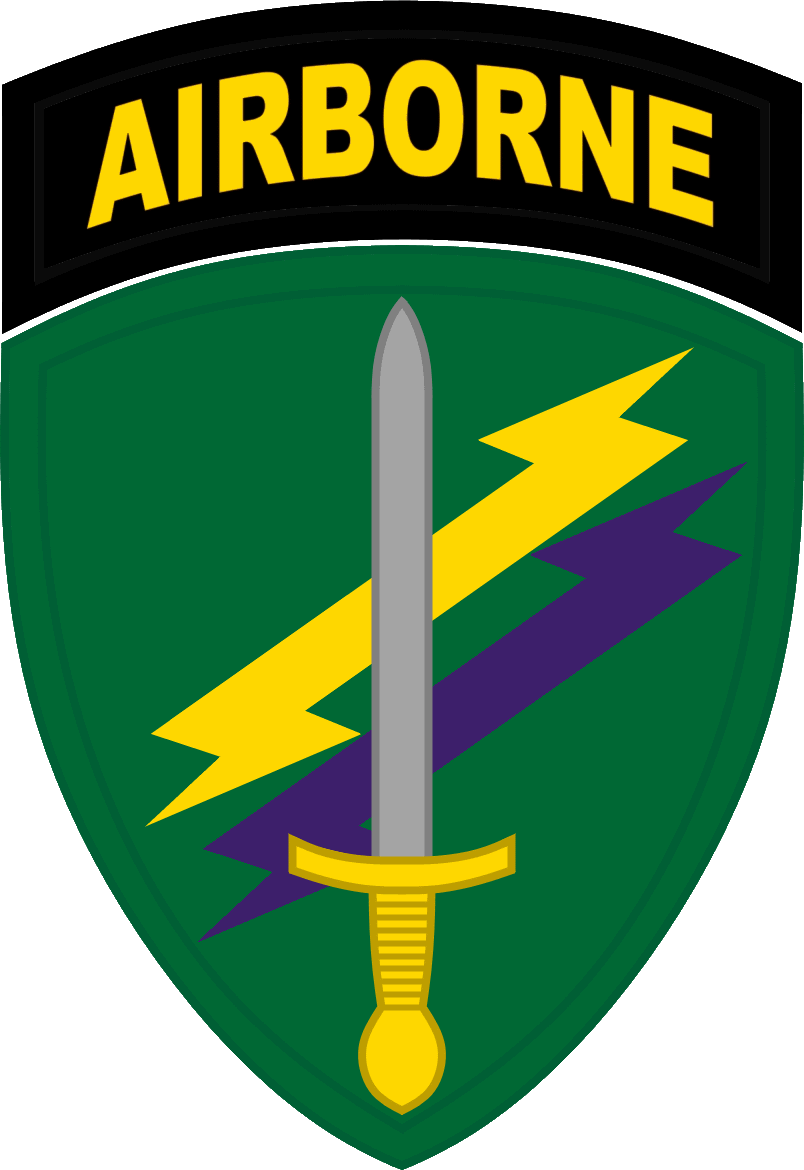
- USACAPOC Shoulder Sleeve Insignia, worn by the 321st Civil Affairs Brigade and all other subordinate USACAPOC units

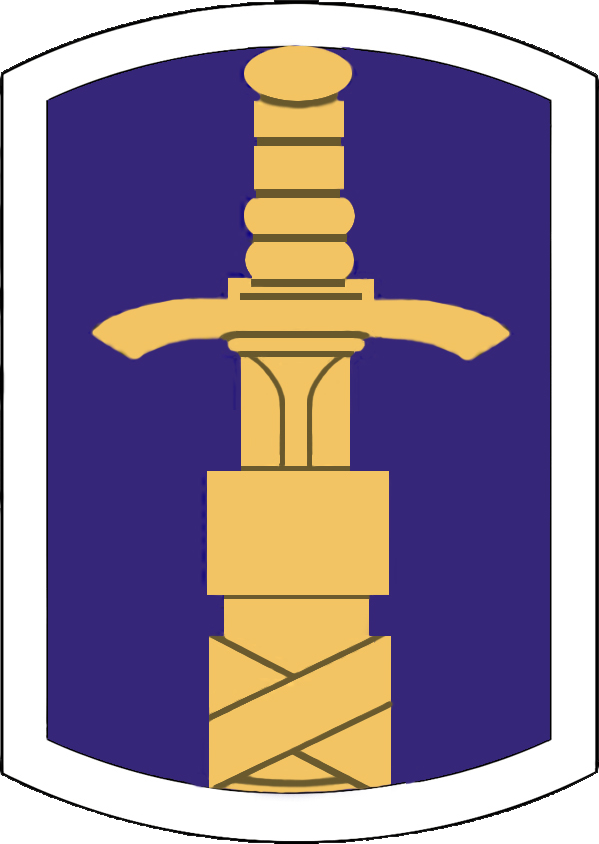
- Former shoulder sleeve insignia of the 321st Civil Affairs Brigade

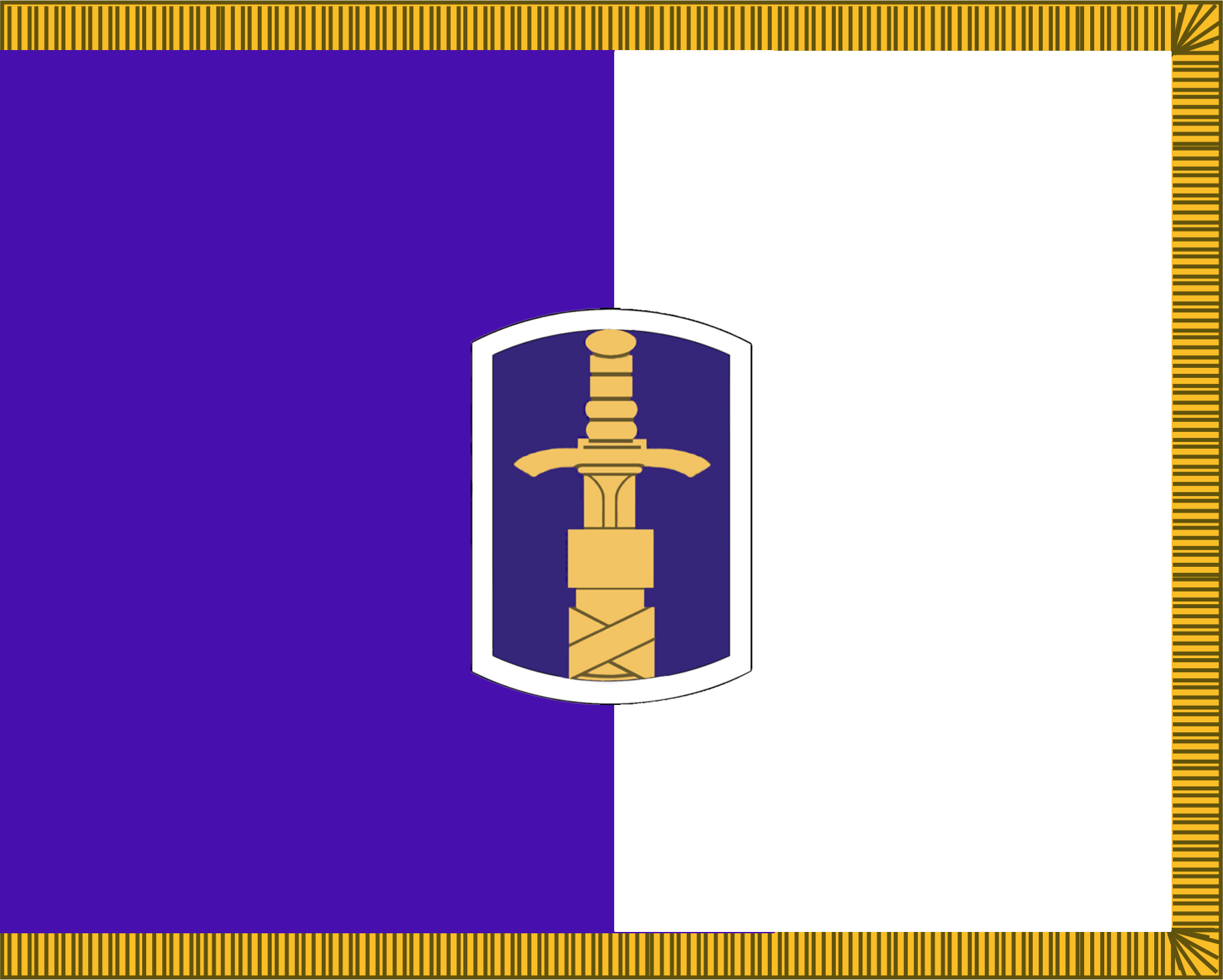
- 321st Civil Affairs Brigade Flag

The 321st Civil Affairs Brigade is a unit of the US Army Reserve as a part of the 350th Civil Affairs Command. The unit was originally created in 1945 in the Army of the United States as the HHD 101st Military Government Group at the Presidio of Monterey, Calif. It was inactive from 1949-1955 when it was redesignated the 321st Military Government Group in Albuquerque, NM. It would be redesignated again twice before 1963 when it was in San Antonio, Texas as the 321st Civil Affairs Group. It would become a Brigade in 1992.

In 1995-1997, subordinate units of the brigade would serve in Bosnia. In 2003-2005, subordinate units were again federalized and deployed after the September 11 terrorist attacks, probably for the War in Afghanistan (2001-2021) or the Iraq War (U.S. phase, 2003-2010).

== Organization ==
The brigade is a subordinate unit of the 350th Civil Affairs Command. As of January 2026 the brigade consists of the following units:

- 321st Civil Affairs Brigade, at Joint Base San Antonio (TX)
  - Headquarters and Headquarters Company, at Joint Base San Antonio (TX)
  - 410th Civil Affairs Battalion, at Fort Bliss (TX)
  - 436th Civil Affairs Battalion, in Sanford (FL)
    - Bravo Company, 436th Civil Affairs Battalion, in Pinellas Park (FL)
  - 451st Civil Affairs Battalion, in Houston (TX)
  - 490th Civil Affairs Battalion, in Grand Prairie (TX)

Each Civil Affairs Battalion consists of a Headquarters and Headquarters Company and four civil affairs companies.
