= 350th Civil Affairs Command =

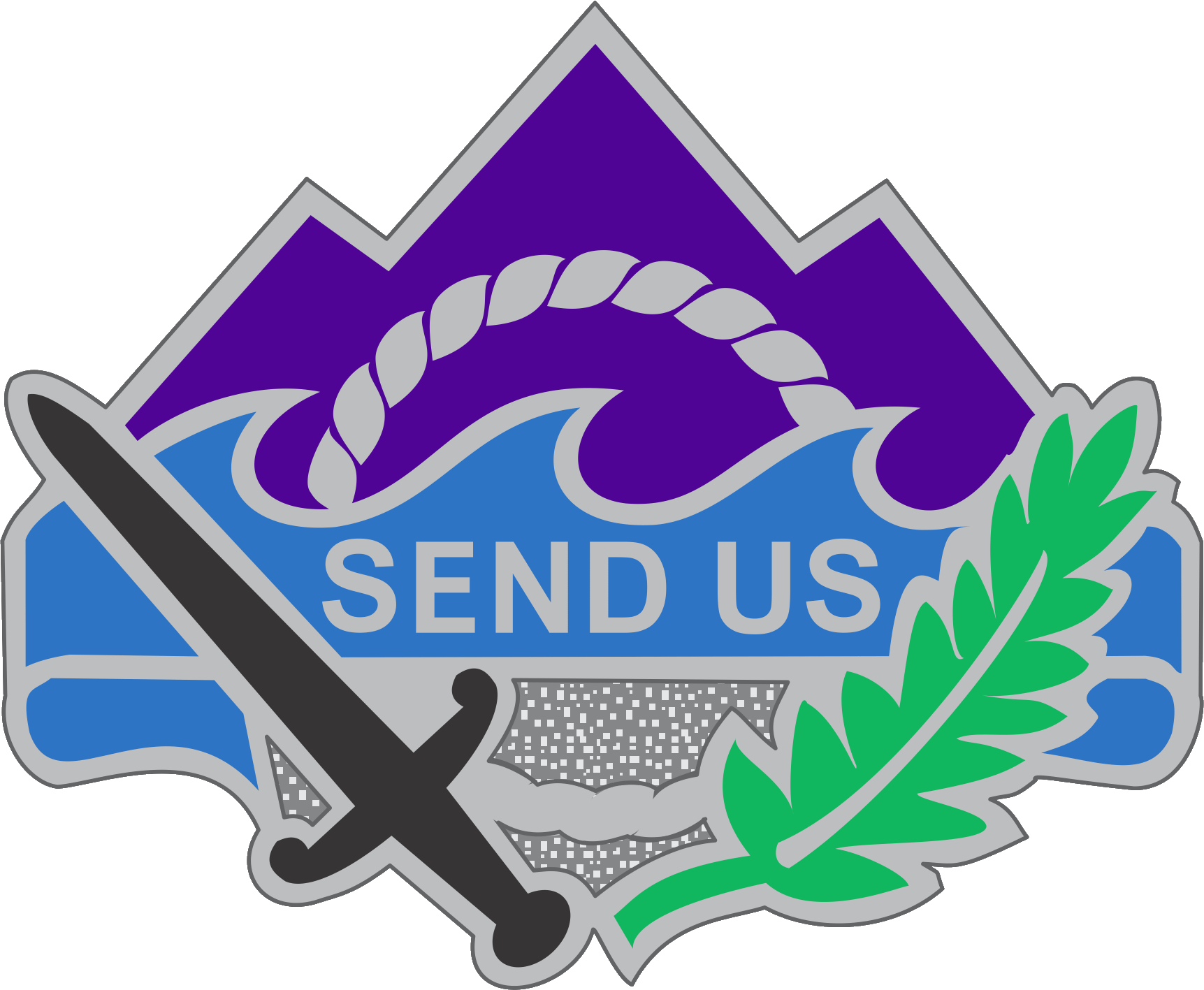
- 350th Civil Affairs Command Distinctive Unit Insignia
- Active: 1999—present
- Country: United States
- Branch: US Army Reserve
- Role: Civil Affairs
- Size: Command
- Part of: U.S. Army Civil Affairs and Psychological Operations Command (USACAPOC)
- Garrison/HQ: Pensacola, Florida
- Motto: Send Us
- Website: https://www.usar.army.mil/USACAPOC/350thCACOM/

Commanders
- Current commander: COL Marshall Straus Scantlin
- Command Sergeant Major: CSM Billy D. Lambert

Insignia
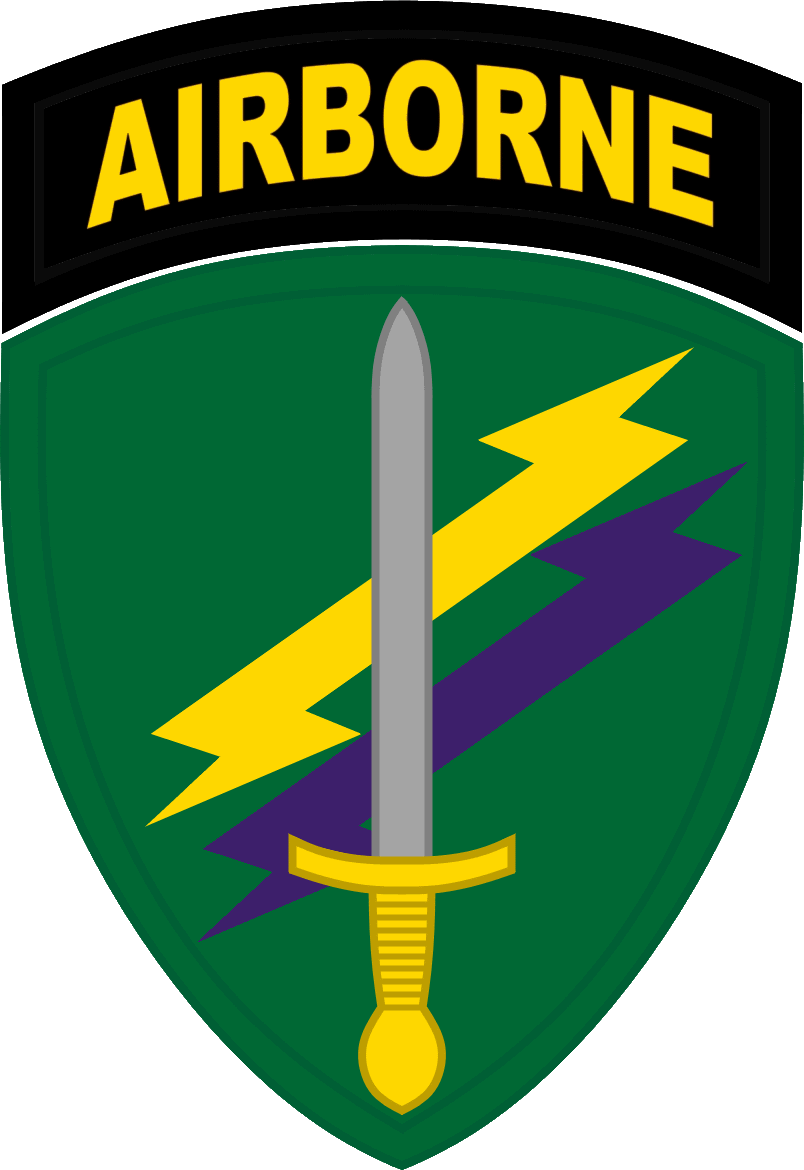
- USACAPOC Shoulder Sleeve Insignia, worn by the 350th Civil Affairs Command and all other subordinate USACAPOC units

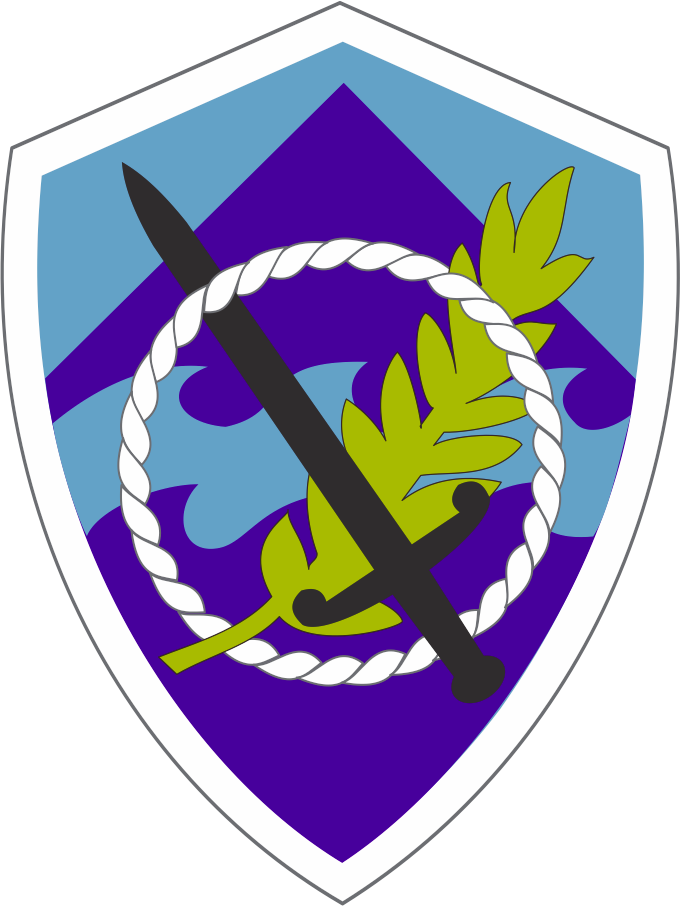
- Former shoulder sleeve insignia of the 350th Civil Affairs Command

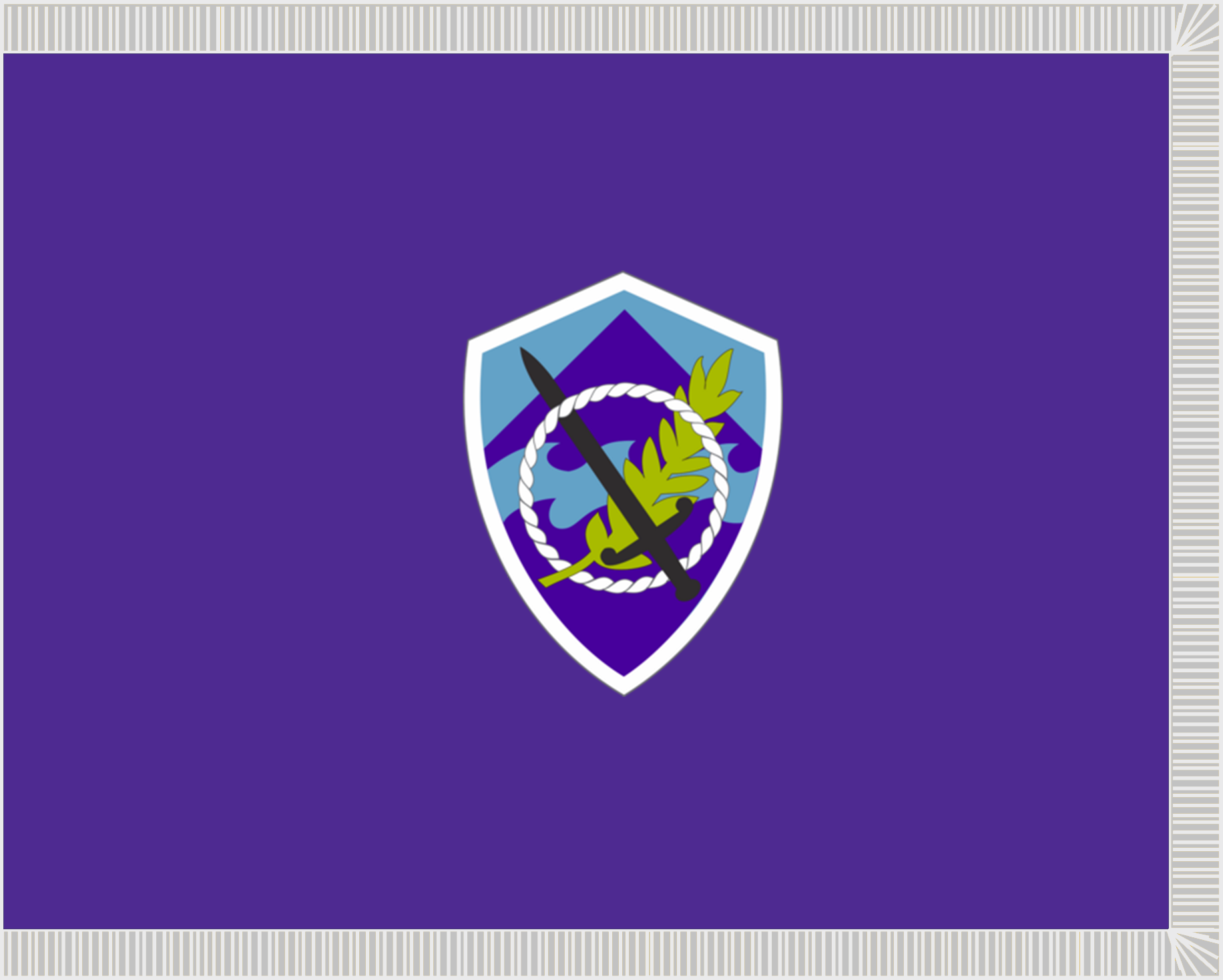
- 350th Civil Affairs Command Flag

The 350th Civil Affairs Command is a unit of the US Army Reserve headquartered in Pensacola, Florida since its creation in 1999. The unit is subordinate to the Army Civil Affairs and Psychological Operations Command.

== Organization ==
The command is a subordinate unit of the Civil Affairs and Psychological Operations Command (Airborne). As of January 2026 the command consists of the following units:

- 350th Civil Affairs Command, at Naval Air Station Pensacola Corry Station (FL)
  - Headquarters and Headquarters Company, at Naval Air Station Pensacola Corry Station (FL)
  - 1st Civil Affairs and Psychological Operations Training Brigade, at Fort Bragg (NC)
    - 1001st Civil Affairs and Psychological Operations Training Company, in Trenton (NJ)
    - 1002nd Civil Affairs and Psychological Operations Training Company, at Joint Base McGuire–Dix–Lakehurst (NJ)
    - 1003rd Civil Affairs and Psychological Operations Training Company, in Garner (NC)
    - 1004th Civil Affairs and Psychological Operations Training Company, in Encino (CA)
    - 1005th Civil Affairs and Psychological Operations Training Company, at Fort Ord (CA)
  - 151st Theater Information Operations Group, at Fort Totten (NY)
    - Headquarters and Headquarters Company, at Fort Totten (NY)
    - 301st Information Operations Battalion, at Fort Totten (NY)
    - 303rd Information Operations Battalion, at Camp Parks (CA)
  - 321st Civil Affairs Brigade, at Joint Base San Antonio (TX)
    - Headquarters and Headquarters Company, at Joint Base San Antonio (TX)
    - 410th Civil Affairs Battalion, at Fort Bliss (TX)
    - 436th Civil Affairs Battalion, in Sanford (FL)
    - 451st Civil Affairs Battalion, in Houston (TX)
    - 490th Civil Affairs Battalion, in Grand Prairie (TX)
