= Ron Clark (judge) =

American judge and former politician (born 1953)

Senior Judge of the United States District Court for the Eastern District of Texas
- Incumbent
- Assumed office February 28, 2018

Chief Judge of the United States District Court for the Eastern District of Texas
- In office January 1, 2015 – February 28, 2018
- Preceded by: Leonard Davis
- Succeeded by: J. Rodney Gilstrap

Judge of the United States District Court for the Eastern District of Texas
- In office October 10, 2002 – February 28, 2018
- Appointed by: George W. Bush
- Preceded by: Howell Cobb
- Succeeded by: Michael J. Truncale

Member of the Texas House of Representatives from the 62nd district
- In office January 14, 1997 – November 21, 2002
- Preceded by: Roger D. Sanders
- Succeeded by: Larry Phillips

Personal details
- Born: Ronald Hurley Clark; 1953 (age 72–73) Caripito, Monagas, Venezuela
- Party: Republican
- Education: University of Connecticut (BA, MA); University of Texas Law School (JD)

Ronald Hurley Clark (born 1953) is a senior United States district judge of the United States District Court for the Eastern District of Texas. He was a member of the Texas House of Representatives from the 62nd district from 1997 to 2002 and was affiliated with the Republican party. He was elected to the 78th Texas Legislature but was never sworn.

== Biography ==
Born in Caripito, Venezuela, Clark received a Bachelor of Arts degree from the University of Connecticut in 1973 and a Master of Arts degree from the University of Connecticut in 1974.

He was an armor officer in the United States Army from 1974 to 1976, where he served at Fort Hood, Texas and Germany as a mortar platoon leader and tank company executive officer in 1st Battalion, 66th Armor Regiment, 2nd Armor Division. In 1979, he received a Juris Doctor from the University of Texas Law School in Austin. He was in the United States Army Reserve from 1980 to 1990, where he served in the 490th Civil Affairs Company in Abilene, Texas (1980–82) and the Individual Ready Reserve (1983–90). He reached the rank of captain.

Clark was an assistant city attorney in the City Attorney's Office of Abilene from 1979 to 1982 while working in the Public Defender's office his business card read: "Reasonable Doubt, at a Reasonable Price." He was in private practice in Texas from 1982 to 2002. From 1997 to 2002, while in Sherman in Grayson County, Clark was member of the Texas House of Representatives from the 62nd district and was affiliated with the Republican party.

=== Federal judicial service ===
On January 23, 2002, Clark was nominated by President George W. Bush to a seat on the United States District Court for the Eastern District of Texas vacated by Howell Cobb. Clark was confirmed by the United States Senate on October 2, 2002, and received his commission on October 10, 2002. A brief controversy arose over Clark's stated intent to remain on the ballot for reelection to his Texas House seat, and to serve through the next legislative session before assuming his judgeship, but this delay proved uncomfortable for the Bush Administration, and ultimately did not materialize. Clark nonetheless won the most votes in the November election, declining the seat and leaving a vacancy to be filled in a later special election. Clark served as chief judge from January 1, 2015, to February 28, 2018. He assumed senior status on February 28, 2018.

Texas House of Representatives
Preceded by Roger D. Sanders	Member of the Texas House of Representatives from District 62 (Sherman); 1997–2002	Succeeded by Larry Phillips
Legal offices
Preceded by Howell Cobb	Judge of the United States District Court for the Eastern District of Texas; 2002–2018	Succeeded by Michael J. Truncale
Preceded by Leonard Davis	Chief Judge of the United States District Court for the Eastern District of Texas; 2015–2018	Succeeded by James Rodney Gilstrap
