= Robert W. Schroeder III =

American judge (born 1966)

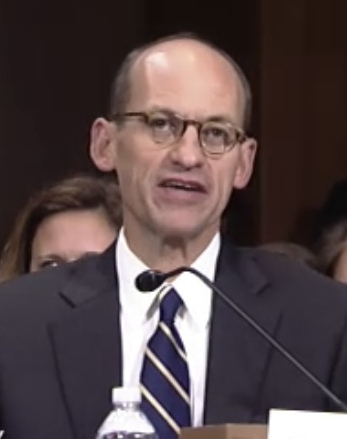
- Schroeder in 2014

Judge of the United States District Court for the Eastern District of Texas
- Incumbent
- Assumed office December 19, 2014
- Appointed by: Barack Obama
- Preceded by: David Folsom

Personal details
- Born: Robert William Schroeder III; 1966 (age 59–60) Texarkana, Texas, U.S.
- Education: University of Arkansas at Little Rock (BA); American University (JD)

Robert William Schroeder III (born 1966) is a United States district judge of the United States District Court for the Eastern District of Texas.

== Biography ==
Schroeder was born in 1966, in Texarkana, Texas. He received a Bachelor of Arts degree in 1989 from the University of Arkansas at Little Rock. He received a Juris Doctor in 1994 from the American University Washington College of Law. From 1995 to 1996, he served as Assistant Counsel to the President of the United States and in 1997 he served as Associate Counsel to the President. He served as a law clerk to Judge Richard S. Arnold of the United States Court of Appeals for the Eighth Circuit from 1997 to 1999. From 1999 to 2014, he worked at the law firm of Patton, Tidwell, Schroeder & Culbertson, LLP, in Texarkana and its predecessor firm, becoming partner in 2003. He handled complex civil litigation in Federal and State courts.

=== Federal judicial service ===
On June 26, 2014, President Barack Obama nominated Schroeder to serve as a United States district judge of the United States District Court for the Eastern District of Texas, to the seat vacated by Judge David Folsom, who retired on March 17, 2012. He received a hearing before the United States Senate Committee on the Judiciary for September 9, 2014. On November 20, 2014 his nomination was reported out of committee by voice vote. On Saturday, December 13, 2014 Senate Majority Leader Harry Reid filed a motion to invoke cloture on the nomination. On December 16, 2014, Reid withdrew his cloture motion on Schroeder's nomination, and the Senate proceeded to vote to confirm Schroeder in a voice vote. He received his federal judicial commission on December 19, 2014.

== Patent litigation expertise ==
By virtue of being one of two active Article III U.S. District Court Judges handling the voluminous patent cases filed in Marshall, Texas and Tyler, Texas, and the fact that former Judge Leonard Davis (retired in 2015) left a district court judgeship vacancy in Tyler, Judge Schroeder is the second most active patent judge in the nation, and deals with the second highest number of patent cases under Judge J. Rodney Gilstrap in Marshall.

Among Judge Schroeder's notable patent cases include the VirnetX v. Apple lawsuit, where in 2017 Virnetx won a $302 million verdict against Apple, with $137 in enhanced fees and damages, totaling to a damages award near $439 million. A previous version of the case in 2016 resulted in a verdict of $625 million that Apple had to pay VirnetX. However, that verdict was voided by Judge Schroeder, which led to the 2017 retrial.

Legal offices
Preceded by David Folsom	Judge of the United States District Court for the Eastern District of Texas; 2014–present	Incumbent
