= J. Campbell Barker =

American judge (born 1980)

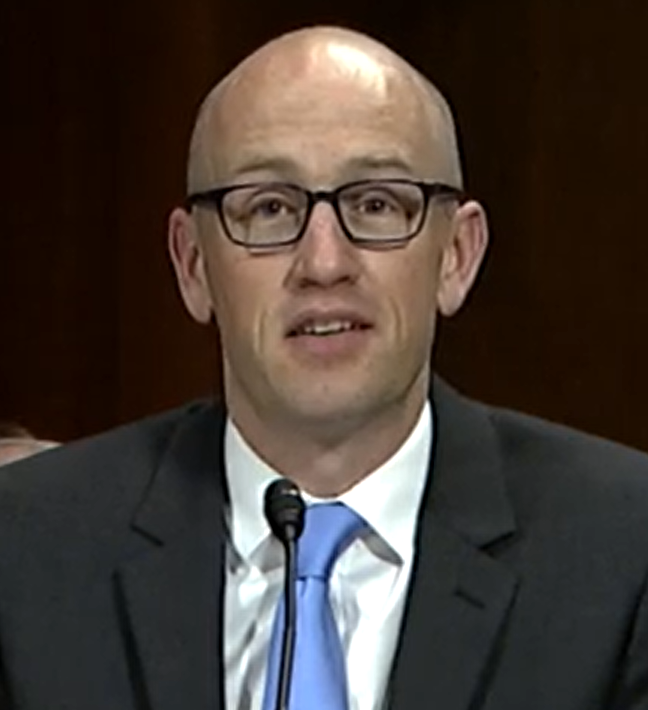

Judge of the United States District Court for the Eastern District of Texas
- Incumbent
- Assumed office May 3, 2019
- Appointed by: Donald Trump
- Preceded by: Leonard Davis

Personal details
- Born: 1980 (age 45–46) New Orleans, Louisiana, U.S.
- Education: Texas A&M University (BS); University of Texas (JD); Duke Law School (LLM)

John Campbell "Cam" Barker (born 1980) is a United States district judge of the United States District Court for the Eastern District of Texas.

== Education and career ==
Barker earned his Bachelor of Science from Texas A&M University, summa cum laude, in computer engineering. As an undergraduate, he was inducted into Tau Beta Pi, hired by Microsoft as a programmer, and co-authored a paper published in the IEEE Transactions on Multimedia. Barker then earned his Juris Doctor from the University of Texas School of Law with highest honors, graduating first in his class. While on the law review there, Barker published an article on copyright statutory damages that was cited by the district court in Sony BMG v. Tenenbaum, 721 F. Supp. 2d 85 (D. Mass. 2010).

Upon graduation from law school, Barker served as a law clerk to Judge William Curtis Bryson of the United States Court of Appeals for the Federal Circuit and Judge John M. Walker Jr. of the United States Court of Appeals for the Second Circuit. After his clerkships, he served as a trial attorney in the Department of Justice's Criminal Division for four years and was detailed as a Special Assistant United States Attorney for the Eastern District of Virginia in 2009. Barker prosecuted three members of the MS-13 gang who were convicted of conspiracy and racketeering. Barker was given the Department of Justice's Meritorious Award three times while serving under U.S. Attorneys General Michael Mukasey and Eric Holder. Also, while at the Department of Justice, the American Inns of Court selected Barker to visit London and study English law as one of two annual Pegasus Scholars.

From 2011 to 2015, Barker practiced commercial and intellectual property law at Yetter Coleman LLP in Texas, where he was named a partner. While at the firm, Barker was twice named to the Pro Bono College of the State Bar of Texas and was named Appellate Lawyer of the Week by Texas Lawyer magazine for helping an immigrant reverse a decision denying him asylum.

From 2015 to 2019, Barker served as Deputy Solicitor General of Texas under Solicitors General Scott A. Keller and Kyle D. Hawkins, in which he helped to represent the state of Texas on appeal before federal and state courts in civil and criminal actions. For his work there, Barker twice earned a Best Brief Award from the National Association of Attorneys General.

While a sitting judge, Barker graduated in 2023 from Duke Law School with a Master of Laws in judicial studies. In 2024, a version of his Master of Laws thesis paper was published in the Washington University Law Review with the title "Standing Orders: A Survey of Individual Judges’ Regulation of Practice in All Future Cases Before Them.

=== Federal judicial service ===
On January 23, 2018, President Donald Trump nominated Barker to the seat on the United States District Court for the Eastern District of Texas vacated by Judge Leonard Davis, who retired on May 15, 2015. On May 9, 2018, a hearing on his nomination was held before the Senate Judiciary Committee. On June 7, 2018, his nomination was reported out of committee by an 11–10 vote.

On January 3, 2019, his nomination was returned to the President under Rule XXXI, Paragraph 6 of the United States Senate. On January 23, 2019, President Trump announced his intent to renominate Barker for a federal judgeship. His nomination was sent to the Senate later that day. On February 7, 2019, his nomination was reported out of committee by a 12–10 vote. On April 30, 2019, the Senate invoked cloture on his nomination by a 52–46 vote. On May 1, 2019, his nomination was confirmed by a 51–47 vote. He received his judicial commission on May 3, 2019.

== Notable rulings ==
On February 25, 2021, Barker struck down the Centers for Disease Control and Prevention's federal eviction moratorium.

On March 9, 2024, Barker vacated the National Labor Relations Board's final rule on joint-employer status, issued in October 2023, that was set to be in effect 3 days later. He had previously stayed the rule until the 11th.

On August 26, 2024, Barker paused President Biden's Keeping Families Together initiative which aims to offer a path to citizenship for immigrants who are married to U.S. citizens and living in the United States illegally. This was placed on temporary hold due to a lawsuit from 16 states, citing it could be harmful to them. On November 7, 2024, Barker ruled that the Biden administration lacked the authority to establish the program and to bypass Congress to create immigration legislation by executive order.

== See also ==
- Donald Trump judicial appointment controversies

Legal offices
Preceded by Leonard Davis	Judge of the United States District Court for the Eastern District of Texas; 2019–present	Incumbent
