= William F. Robertson =

American politician

Member of the Texas House of Representatives from the 71st district
- In office January 8, 1901 – January 13, 1903

Member of the Texas House of Representatives from the 62nd district
- In office January 13, 1903 – January 10, 1905
- Preceded by: Oscar Fides McAnally
- Succeeded by: Samuel David Davis

Personal details
- Born: July 13, 1859
- Died: November 7, 1941 (aged 82)
- Party: Democratic

William F. Robertson (July 13, 1859 – November 7, 1941) was an American politician. He served as a Democratic member for the 62nd and 71st district of the Texas House of Representatives.
