= James Millard Kennedy =

American politician

Member of the Texas House of Representatives from the 62nd district
- In office September 9, 1914 – January 12, 1915
- Preceded by: M. C. Fields
- Succeeded by: Julius Rector

Personal details
- Born: September 23, 1868
- Died: April 19, 1942 (aged 73)
- Party: Democratic

James Millard Kennedy (September 23, 1868 – April 19, 1942) was an American politician. He served as a Democratic member for the 62nd district of the Texas House of Representatives.
