= Bob Bush (politician) =

American politician (1936–2002)

Member of the Texas House of Representatives from the 22nd district
- In office January 11, 1977 – January 11, 1983

Member of the Texas House of Representatives from the 62nd district
- In office January 11, 1983 – January 13, 1987
- Preceded by: Gary Thompson
- Succeeded by: Curtis Lee Seidlits Jr.

Personal details
- Born: Robert Grammar Bush III; January 15, 1936 Kansas City, Missouri, U.S.
- Died: May 14, 2002 (aged 66)
- Party: Democratic

Robert Grammar Bush III (January 15, 1936 – May 14, 2002) was an American politician. He served as a Democratic member for the 22nd and 62nd district of the Texas House of Representatives.
