= Joseph D. Brown =

American lawyer (born 1970)

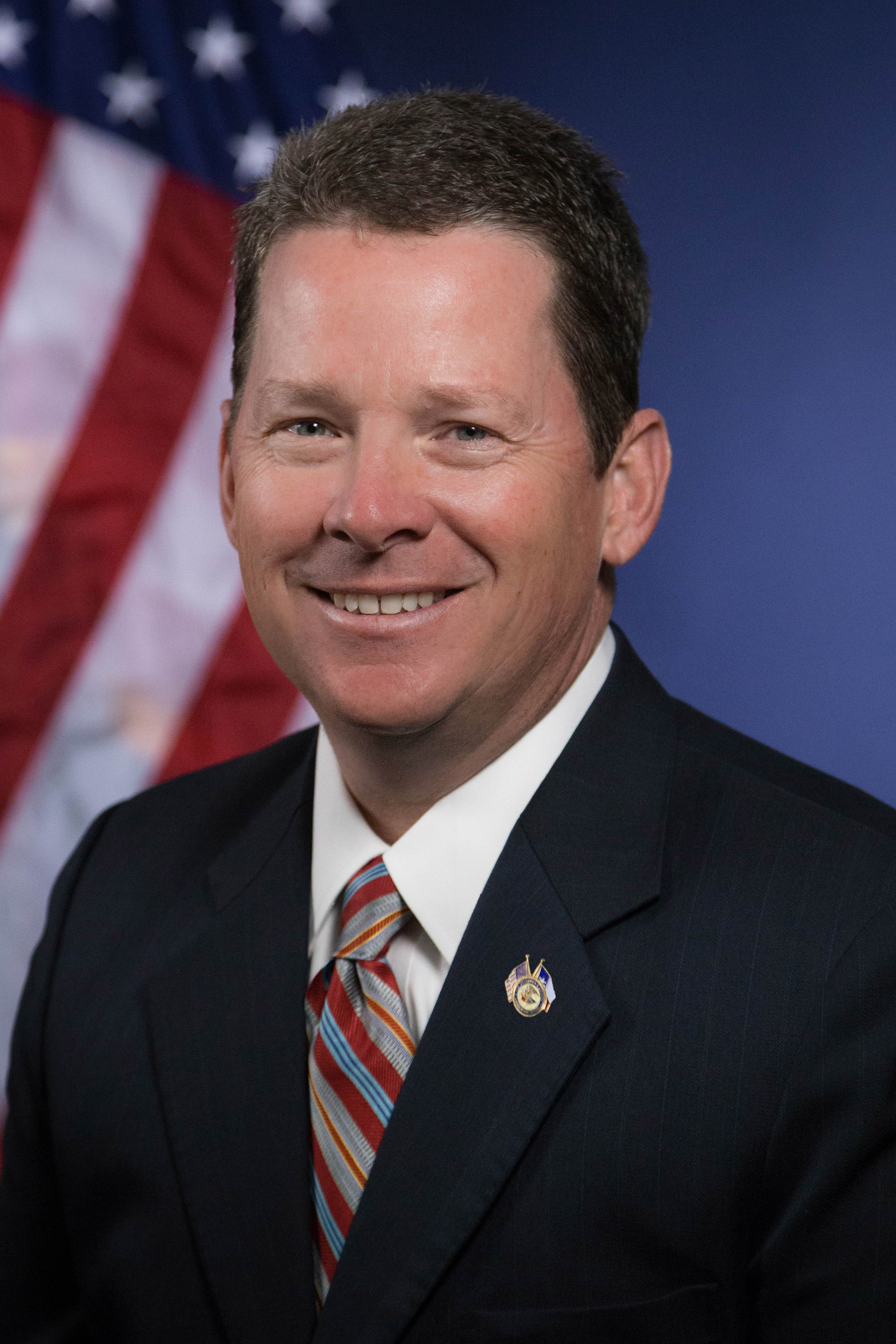

United States Attorney for the Eastern District of Texas
- In office February 26, 2018 – May 31, 2020
- President: Donald Trump
- Preceded by: John Malcolm Bales

Grayson County District Attorney
- In office January 1, 2001 – February 18, 2018
- Preceded by: Bob Jarvis
- Succeeded by: Brett Smith

Personal details
- Born: 1970 (age 55–56) Sherman, Texas, U.S.
- Party: Republican
- Education: University of Texas at Austin (BA); Dedman School of Law (JD)

Joseph D. Brown (born 1970) is an American lawyer who served as the United States Attorney for the United States District Court for the Eastern District of Texas from February 26, 2018, until May 31, 2020. He was formerly the District Attorney for Grayson County, Texas. Brown served as Grayson County's District Attorney for 17 years. He previously served as an associate attorney for the law firm of Cowles and Thompson and on the state board of the Texas Juvenile Justice Department. Brown received his Bachelor of Arts from the University of Texas in 1995 and his Juris Doctor from Dedman School of Law. Brown is the son of former District Judge David Brown and the nephew of the late U.S. District Judge Paul Neeley Brown. On February 15, 2018, his nomination to become a U.S. Attorney was confirmed by voice vote. He was sworn in on February 26, 2018.

During his tenure as United States Attorney, Brown led an investigation of Walmart for alleged criminal and civil violations related to the corporation's distribution of opioids through its pharmacies. Brown and his prosecutors sought to indict Walmart and individuals within the company for violations of the Controlled Substances Act, alleging that from 2011 until 2017 the company had ignored pharmacists warnings that prescriptions were being filled for "pill mill" physicians for reasons other than legitimate medical treatment. Before it could be indicted, Walmart appealed the matter to Department of Justice officials in Washington, and the Texas prosecutors were told to stand down.
