= Samuel David Davis =

American politician (1863–1933)

Member of the Texas House of Representatives from the 62nd district
- In office January 10, 1905 – January 12, 1909
- Preceded by: William F. Robertson
- Succeeded by: W.S. Brookshire

Personal details
- Born: February 15, 1863
- Died: May 11, 1933 (aged 70)
- Party: Democratic

Samuel David Davis (February 15, 1863 – May 11, 1933) was an American politician. He served as a Democratic member for the 62nd district of the Texas House of Representatives.
