= Gary Thompson (politician) =

American politician

Member of the Texas House of Representatives from the 62nd district
- In office January 9, 1979 – January 11, 1983
- Preceded by: David Stubbeman
- Succeeded by: Bob Bush

Member of the Texas House of Representatives from the 79th district
- In office January 11, 1983 – June 2, 1986

Personal details
- Born: Gary Eugene Thompson; June 15, 1936
- Died: April 13, 2017 (aged 80) Blacksburg, Virginia, U.S.
- Party: Democratic

Gary Eugene Thompson (June 15, 1936 – April 13, 2017) was an American politician. He served as a Democratic member for the 62nd and 79th district of the Texas House of Representatives.

Thompson died on April 13, 2017 in Blacksburg, Virginia, at the age of 80.
