= Paul Neeley Brown =

American judge (1926–2012)

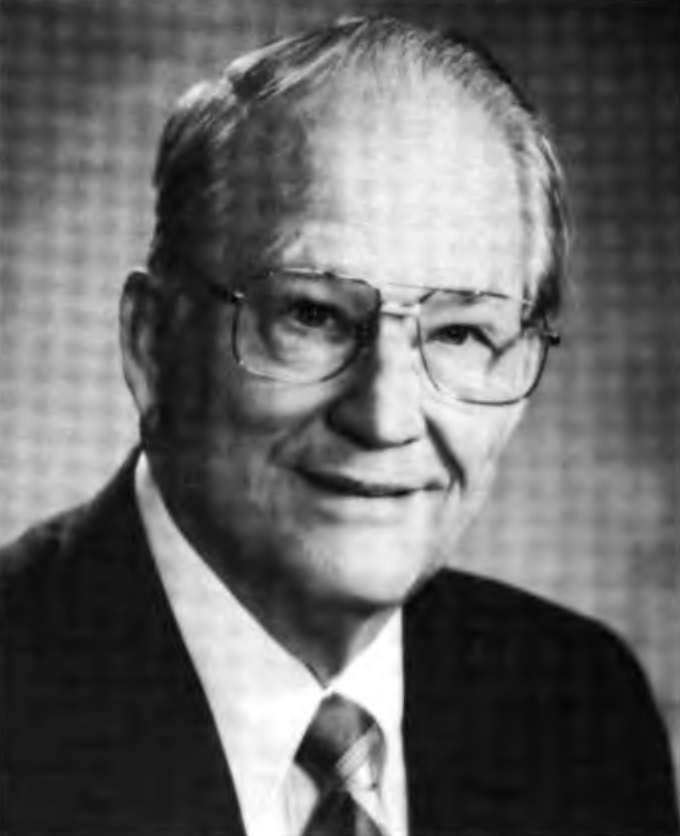

Senior Judge of the United States District Court for the Eastern District of Texas
- In office April 1, 2001 – November 26, 2012

Judge of the United States District Court for the Eastern District of Texas
- In office October 17, 1985 – April 1, 2001
- Appointed by: Ronald Reagan
- Preceded by: Seat established by 98 Stat. 333
- Succeeded by: Leonard Davis

Personal details
- Born: Paul Neeley Brown; October 4, 1926 Grayson County, Texas, U.S.
- Died: November 26, 2012 (aged 86) Sherman, Texas, U.S.
- Relations: Joseph D. Brown (nephew)
- Education: University of Texas School of Law (J.D.)

Paul Neeley Brown (October 4, 1926 – November 26, 2012) was an attorney and United States district judge of the United States District Court for the Eastern District of Texas. He had previously served as the United States Attorney for the Eastern District of Texas.

== Education and career ==
Born in Denison, Texas, Brown served as an Electrician's Mate in the United States Navy during World War II, entering the service at age 18 and serving from 1944 to 1946. Afterward he went to college on the GI Bill, and earned a Juris Doctor from the University of Texas School of Law in 1950. He returned to the Navy for a short tour from 1950 to 1951. After being discharged, Brown returned to Sherman, Texas and set up a private practice. In 1953 he was appointed as an Assistant United States Attorney for the Eastern District of Texas, serving from 1953 to 1959. He was appointed as the United States Attorney for the Eastern District of Texas from 1959 to 1961. He returned to private practice in Sherman from 1961 to 1985.

== Federal judicial service ==
On September 11, 1985, Brown was nominated by President Ronald Reagan to a new seat on the United States District Court for the Eastern District of Texas created by 98 Stat. 333. He was confirmed by the United States Senate on October 16, 1985, and received his commission on October 17, 1985. He assumed senior status on April 1, 2001. He died on November 26, 2012.

== Honors ==
- The United States Courthouse, located at 101 East Pecan Street in Sherman, Texas, was designated by Congress as the "Paul Brown United States Courthouse."

== Sources ==
- CBO - http://www.cbo.gov/publication/44450

Legal offices
Preceded by Seat established by 98 Stat. 333	Judge of the United States District Court for the Eastern District of Texas; 1985–2001	Succeeded by Leonard Davis
