= Howell Cobb (judge) =

American judge (1922–2005)

Senior Judge of the United States District Court for the Eastern District of Texas
- In office March 1, 2001 – September 16, 2005

Judge of the United States District Court for the Eastern District of Texas
- In office April 4, 1985 – March 1, 2001
- Appointed by: Ronald Reagan
- Preceded by: Seat established by 98 Stat. 333
- Succeeded by: Ron Clark

Personal details
- Born: Howell Cobb; December 7, 1922 Atlanta, Georgia, U.S.
- Died: September 16, 2005 (aged 82) Castine, Maine, U.S.
- Education: University of Virginia (LL.B.)

Howell Cobb (December 7, 1922 – September 16, 2005) was a Texas lawyer and United States district judge of the United States District Court for the Eastern District of Texas.

== Education and career ==
Born in Atlanta, Georgia, Cobb joined the United States Navy in 1942, completing his cadet training in 1943 and serving as a lieutenant in the United States Marine Corps from 1943 to 1945, during which time he was a fighter pilot in the Pacific Theater. He finished his service as an instructor at Pensacola Naval Air Station in 1945. He then returned to school, receiving a Bachelor of Laws from the University of Virginia School of Law in 1948. He went into private practice, first in Houston, Texas, from 1949 to 1954, and then in Beaumont, Texas, from 1954 to 1985.

== Federal judicial service ==
On February 26, 1985, President Ronald Reagan nominated Cobb to a new seat on the United States District Court for the Eastern District of Texas, created by 98 Stat. 333. Cobb was confirmed by the United States Senate on April 3, 1985, and received his commission the following day. He assumed senior status on March 1, 2001, and continued serving in that capacity until his death of a heart attack, during a family vacation in Castine, Maine.

== Personal ==
Cobb and his wife, Amelie, had six children. Cobb was the great grandson of the former governor of Georgia and Civil War figure Howell Cobb.

== Sources ==
- "Visiting federal judge dies in Castine Sept. 16", Bangor Daily News (Maine) (September 19, 2005), B3.

Legal offices
Preceded by Seat established by 98 Stat. 333	Judge of the United States District Court for the Eastern District of Texas; 1985–2001	Succeeded by Ron Clark
