= Curtis Lee Seidlits Jr. =

American politician

Member of the Texas House of Representatives from the 62nd district
- In office January 13, 1987 – February 3, 1996
- Preceded by: Bob Bush
- Succeeded by: Roger D. Sanders

Personal details
- Party: Democratic

Curtis Lee Seidlits Jr. is an American politician. He served as a Democratic member for the 62nd district of the Texas House of Representatives.
