= Tom Holmes (Texas politician) =

American politician (1935–2023)

Member of the Texas House of Representatives from the 62nd district
- In office January 12, 1965 – January 10, 1967
- Preceded by: James Madison Cotten
- Succeeded by: Frank Calhoun

Member of the Texas House of Representatives from the 53rd district
- In office January 10, 1967 – January 14, 1969

Member of the Texas House of Representatives from the 51st district
- In office January 14, 1969 – January 9, 1973

Personal details
- Born: May 31, 1935
- Died: September 16, 2023 (aged 88)
- Party: Democratic
- Education: Tarleton State University

Tom Holmes (May 31, 1935 – September 16, 2023) was an American politician. He served as a Democratic member for the 51st, 53rd and 62nd district of the Texas House of Representatives.

== Life and career ==
Tom Holmes attended Tarleton State University.

Holmes was a Granbury banker and feed dealer.

Holmes served in the Texas House of Representatives from 1965 to 1973.

Tom Holmes died on September 16, 2023, at the age of 88.
