= Shelley Luther =

American salon owner and politician

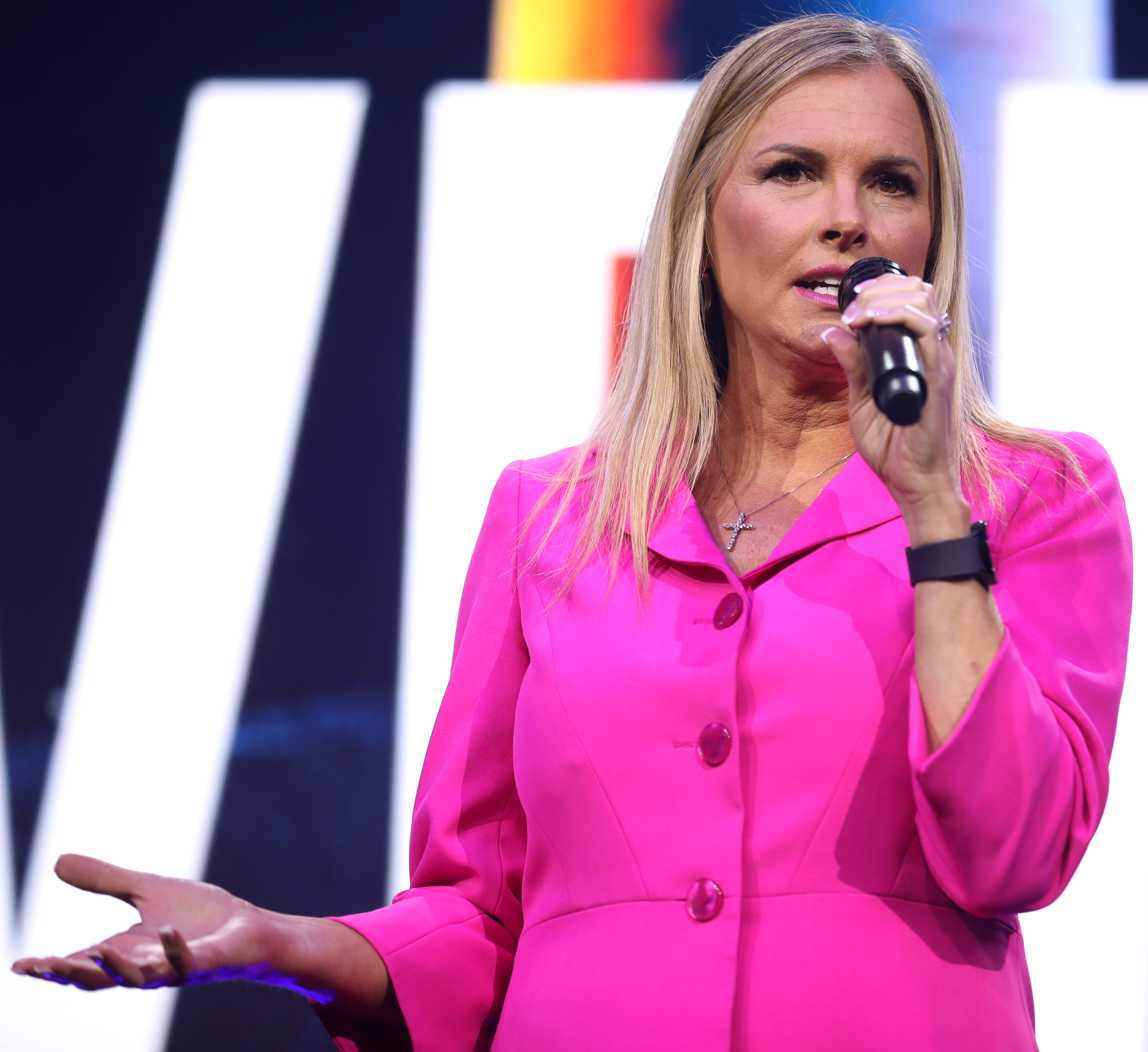
- Luther speaks at the 2024 Young Americans for Liberty national

Member of the Texas House of Representatives from the 62nd district
- Incumbent
- Assumed office January 14, 2025
- Preceded by: Reggie Smith

Personal details
- Born: May 12, 1973 (age 53)
- Party: Republican
- Children: 2
- Profession: Salon owner · Politician

Shelley Luther (born May 12, 1973) is an American salon owner and politician who has represented the 62nd district in the Texas House of Representatives since 2025.

== Early life ==
Luther was born on May 12, 1973. As of 2020, she had been married twice and had two children. She has a passion for rescuing animals and as of 2020 "was nursing six horses, three micro horses and two miniature donkeys", according to The Dallas Morning News. She also sang in a band.

== Salon owner ==
In 2017, Luther founded Hot Mess Enterprises and Salon à la Mode, a beauty salon in Far North Dallas. In 2020, she received national attention for her decision to keep the business open during the COVID-19 pandemic.

As concern over the pandemic started in March 2020, Luther initially followed the stay-at-home orders that shut down most businesses. However, in April, she decided to re-open the business, citing economic concerns as she otherwise had no source of income to support her family and had to pay rent. Shortly after re-opening, she received a citation from the Dallas police on April 24, then a cease-and-desist letter demanding her business to close. However, she declared that she would remain open and attended a rally protesting lockdowns at which she tore up the cease-and-desist letter.

On April 28, the local authorities advanced the case and asked District Judge Eric Moyé to require the business be closed. In response, Luther declared that if she had to "go to jail to prove a point that what they're doing is totally unconstitutional, then that's what happens." As the case proceeded, several Texas Republican Party politicians urged governor Greg Abbott to intervene and allow for it to be legal for salons to be open.

On May 5, several members of the Texas House of Representatives visited a Houston barbershop to protest the lockdowns, and later that day, Governor Abbott declared that salons would be allowed to re-open the next Friday. However, on the same day, Judge Moyé handed Luther a seven-day jail sentence and a fine of $7,000. Prior to the sentencing, the judge "gave Luther an opportunity to apologize and promise not to reopen her salon until she was allowed to do so," and said that she could possibly then receive just a fine "in lieu of the incarceration which you've demonstrated that you have so clearly earned." Luther responded to the judge that "Feeding my kids is not selfish. If you think the law is more important than kids getting fed, then please go ahead with your decision, but I am not going to shut the salon."

Luther's imprisonment received national attention. She and her lawyers immediately appealed the decision and ended up appealing to the Texas Supreme Court. She received significant support from the Republican Party and Texas Attorney General Ken Paxton also appealed to Moyé, stating that he "had abused his discretion and should immediately order Luther's release." Dan Patrick, the Texas lieutenant governor, declared that he would be willing to pay the fine and serve Luther's sentence, while governor Abbott also "joined Paxton in 'disagreeing with the excessive action by the Dallas Judge.'"

On May 7, Abbott changed his executive orders to remove the possibility of imprisonment as a penalty for violating them, which he said would free Luther "if correctly applied". A few hours later, the Texas Supreme Court had her released. Abbott later met with President Donald Trump about Texas's response to the COVID-19 pandemic and discussed Luther, with Trump noting of her release: "Good. I was watching the salon owner, and she looked so great, so professional, so good. And she was talking about her children. She has to feed her children." One day after her release, U.S. Senator Ted Cruz visited her salon and received a haircut.

After the incident, those involved in Luther's sentencing received "harsh blowback" from Republicans. Moyé was up for re-election in the general election in November and the race had "a highly unusual level of attention for a down-ballot judicial race," with even President Trump suggesting for Moyé to be "voted out of office November 3rd", although he ended up winning the race.

Luther, after being released, created a foundation called "Courage to Stand", describing its goal as supporting "hairstylists and other small businesses closed by government orders and crushed by the economic fallout". She appeared on The View where she defended her choice to keep the salon open and led a rally in Laredo where she spoke with several others affected by the lockdowns.

== Political career ==
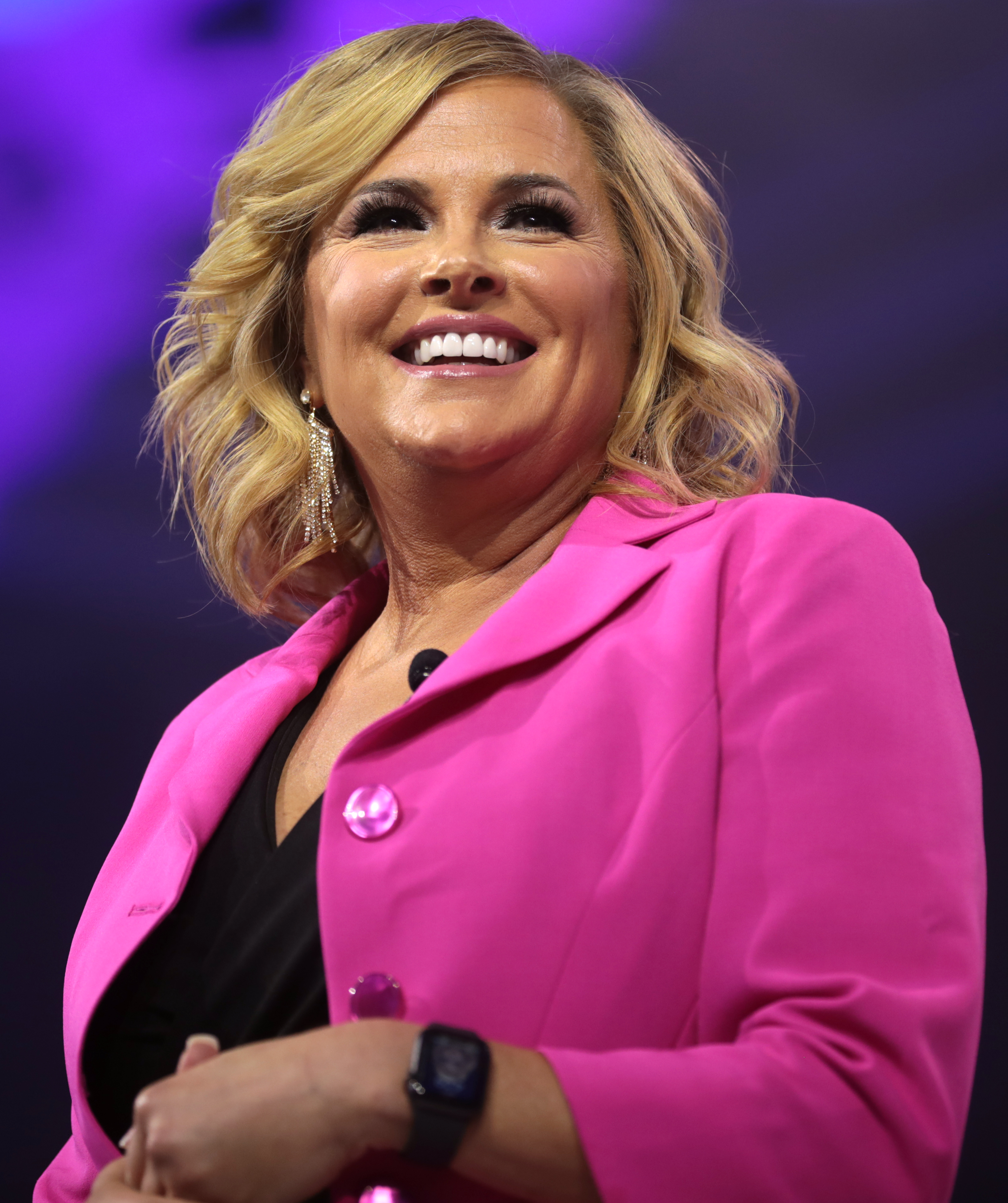
Luther in 2021

In August 2020, Luther entered politics, announcing her campaign for a special election in the Texas Senate to replace the outgoing Pat Fallon. One of her key campaign themes was putting an end to the "shutdown madness", declaring that "the first thing that I would do is start going after Gov. Abbott's lockdown and getting these nursing homes open, the bars and then restaurants all the way open, because I think it is absolutely ridiculous that places like Florida can open all the way today, and here we are in Texas being embarrassed that we're still closed down." One of six candidates in the election, she placed first and received 32.0% of the votes (22,242 votes), but as she did not gain over 50%, it forced a runoff between her and Republican Drew Springer. She was defeated in the runoff, receiving 25,235 votes (43.5%) to Springer's 32,761 (56.5%).

In 2022, Luther ran for the Texas House of Representatives for the seat from the 62nd district. She challenged incumbent Reggie Smith in the primaries, but was defeated after receiving only 41.3% of the votes (10,912, to Smith's 15,510). She ran for the same seat in 2024 and faced Smith in the primaries again, but this time won by seven points. She faced off against Democrat Tiffany Drake in the general election and won with 77.7% of the votes.
