= Roger D. Sanders =

American politician

Member of the Texas House of Representatives from the 62nd district
- In office May 17, 1996 – January 14, 1997
- Preceded by: Curtis Lee Seidlits Jr.
- Succeeded by: Ron Clark

Personal details
- Party: Democratic

Roger D. Sanders is an American politician. He served as a Democratic member for the 62nd district of the Texas House of Representatives.
