= Frank Calhoun =

American politician (1933–2021)

Member of the Texas House of Representatives from the 62-F district
- In office January 10, 1967 – January 14, 1969
- Preceded by: District established
- Succeeded by: District eliminated

Member of the Texas House of Representatives from the 62-2 district
- In office January 14, 1969 – January 9, 1973
- Preceded by: District established
- Succeeded by: District eliminated

Member of the Texas House of Representatives from the 62nd district
- In office January 9, 1973 – January 14, 1975
- Preceded by: Tom Holmes
- Succeeded by: David Stubbeman

Personal details
- Born: Frank Wayne Calhoun; April 15, 1933 Houston, Texas, U.S.
- Died: April 24, 2021 (aged 88) Austin, Texas, U.S.
- Party: Democratic
- Education: Texas Tech University; University of Texas

Frank Wayne Calhoun (April 15, 1933 – April 24, 2021) was an American politician. He served as a Democratic member for the 62nd district of the Texas House of Representatives.

== Life and career ==
Calhoun was born in Houston, Texas. He attended Texas Tech University, studying history and the University of Texas School of Law.

Calhoun served in the Texas House of Representatives from 1967 to 1975.

Calhoun died on April 24, 2021, in Austin, Texas, at the age of 88.
