= Reggie Smith (Texas politician) =

American politician (born 1969)

Member of the Texas House of Representatives from the 62nd district
- In office November 19, 2018 – January 14, 2025
- Preceded by: Larry Phillips
- Succeeded by: Shelley Luther

Personal details
- Born: Reginald Beets Smith Jr. February 4, 1969 (age 57)
- Party: Republican
- Spouse: Stephanie
- Children: 3
- Education: Austin College (BS); South Texas College of Law (JD)
- Occupation: Attorney

Reginald Beets Smith Jr. (born February 4, 1969) is an American politician who served as the representative for the 62nd district in the Texas House of Representatives from 2018 to 2025.

== Personal life and community involvement ==
Smith graduated from Austin College with a Bachelor of Science in political science in 1991. While attending the college, he was a member of the Pi Gamma Mu Honor Society. He later earned a degree law from South Texas College of Law and was admitted to the State Bar of Texas. He works as an attorney.

Smith is married to Stephanie, and they have three children. They are Baptist.

=== Community service ===
Smith has been active in local charitable organizations. He also served on the board of directors of Big Brother Big Sisters, Friends of Scouting with the Texoma Valley Boy Scouts and The Rehab Center. He has also coached Little League baseball.

== Political career ==
Prior to being elected into the Texas House he served two terms as chairman of the Grayson County Republican Party. He also served on the Northern Regional Director of the Texas Republican County Chairman's Association. Currently, Smith is a former member of the Texas House of Representatives and represented District 62. He was sworn in on November 19, 2018, succeeding Larry Phillips, and later departed the office in 2025. He was defeated by Shelley Luther in the March 5, 2024 Republican primary election by a margin of 53% to 47%.

== Electoral history ==
Texas General Election, 2020: Texas House District 62
Party	Candidate	Votes	%
Republican	Reggie Smith	59,020	78.59
Democratic	Gary D. Thomas	16,074	21.41
Total votes		75,094	100%

Texas Republican Primaries, 2020: Texas House District 62
Party	Candidate	Votes	%
Republican	Reggie Smith	18,643	100
Total votes		18,643	100%

Texas General Election, 2018: Texas House District 62
Party	Candidate	Votes	%
Republican	Reggie Smith	41,994	76.16
Democratic	Valerie N. Hefner	12,076	21.90
Libertarian	David Schaab	1,072	1.94
Total votes		55,142	100%

Texas House District 62 Special Election, 2018
Party	Candidate	Votes	%
Republican	Reggie Smith	36,596	100
Total votes		36,596	100%

Texas Republican Primary Runoffs, 2018: Texas House District 62
Party	Candidate	Votes	%
Republican	Reggie Smith	6,529	71.21
Republican	Brent Lawson	2,531	28.79
Total votes		8,790	100%

Texas Republican Primaries, 2018: Texas House District 62
Party	Candidate	Votes	%
Republican	Reggie Smith	7,937	45.84
Republican	Brent Lawson	5,948	34.35
Republican	Kevin Couch	3,430	19.81
Total votes		17,315	100%
