= Michael J. Truncale =

American judge (born 1957)

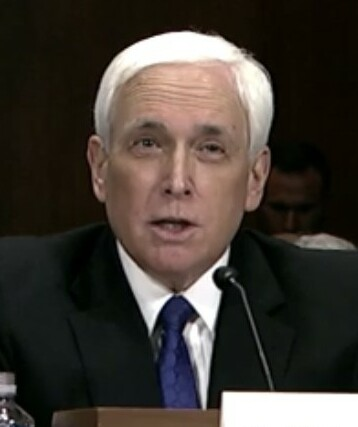

Judge of the United States District Court for the Eastern District of Texas
- Incumbent
- Assumed office May 16, 2019
- Appointed by: Donald Trump
- Preceded by: Ron Clark

Personal details
- Born: Michael Joseph Truncale; 1957 (age 68–69) Beaumont, Texas, U.S.
- Party: Republican
- Education: Lamar University (BA); University of North Texas (MBA); Southern Methodist University (JD)

Michael Joseph Truncale (born 1957) is a United States district judge of the United States District Court for the Eastern District of Texas.

== Biography ==
Truncale was born in 1957 in Beaumont, Texas. He earned his Bachelor of Arts from Lamar University in 1978, his Master of Business Administration from the University of North Texas in 1980, and his Juris Doctor from the Dedman School of Law in 1985.

From 1985 to 2019, he was an associate turned partner at Orgain Bell & Tucker.

Texas Governor Rick Perry appointed Truncale a Regent of the Texas State University System for a four-year term and Governor Greg Abbott appointed him to a six-year term as a member of the state Prepaid Higher Education Tuition Board.

In 2012, Truncale ran as a Republican for Texas's 14th congressional district, which was an open seat due to Ron Paul's retirement. He garnered 14.2% in the Republican primary, taking third place to Pearland City Councilwoman Felicia Harris and state Representative Randy Weber, the eventual winner.

=== Federal judicial service ===
On January 23, 2018, President Donald Trump nominated Truncale to the seat on the United States District Court for the Eastern District of Texas vacated by Judge Ron Clark, who had previously announced his decision to assume senior status on February 28, 2018. On April 25, 2018, a hearing on his nomination was held before the Senate Judiciary Committee. Under questioning by Democratic U.S. Senator Mazie Hirono, Truncale, who previously served as an election judge in Texas, said he had personally witnessed incidents of voter fraud. Hirono challenged him, saying that she did not believe the problem of voter fraud to be widespread. On May 24, 2018, his nomination was reported out of committee by an 11–10 vote.

On January 3, 2019, his nomination was returned to the President under Rule XXXI, Paragraph 6 of the United States Senate. On January 23, 2019, President Trump announced his intent to renominate Truncale for a federal judgeship. His nomination was sent to the Senate later that day. On February 7, 2019, his nomination was reported out of committee by a 12–10 vote. On May 13, 2019, the Senate invoked cloture on his nomination by a 49–43 vote. On May 14, 2019, his nomination was confirmed by a 49–46 vote. Senator Mitt Romney was the only Republican to vote against him because he called Barack Obama an "un-American imposter" in 2011. Truncale said he was "merely expressing frustration by what I perceived as a lack of overt patriotism on behalf of President Obama.'" He received his judicial commission on May 16, 2019.

== Electoral history ==
2012

Texas's 14th Congressional District – Republican Primary, May 29, 2012
Party	Candidate	Votes	%
Republican	Randy Weber	12,088	27.60%
Republican	Felicia Harris	8,287	18.92%
Republican	Michael J. Truncale	6,212	14.18%
Republican	Jay Old	6,143	14.02%
Republican	Robert Gonzalez	4,302	9.82%
Republican	Bill Sargent	3,328	7.60%
Republican	John Gay	2,075	4.74%
Republican	George Harper	813	1.86%
Republican	Mark A. Mansius	554	1.26%
Total votes		43,802	100.00%
Runoff election

== See also ==
- Donald Trump judicial appointment controversies

Legal offices
Preceded by Ron Clark	Judge of the United States District Court for the Eastern District of Texas; 2019–present	Incumbent
