= Leonard Davis (judge) =

American judge (born 1948)

Leonard E. Davis

Chief Judge of the United States District Court for the Eastern District of Texas
- In office 2012–2015
- Preceded by: David Folsom
- Succeeded by: Ron Clark

Judge of the United States District Court for the Eastern District of Texas
- In office May 10, 2002 – May 15, 2015
- Appointed by: George W. Bush
- Preceded by: Paul N. Brown
- Succeeded by: J. Campbell Barker

Personal details
- Born: Leonard Elsworth Davis III; January 15, 1948 (age 78) Fort Worth, Texas, U.S.
- Education: University of Texas, Arlington (BA); Texas Christian University (MA); Baylor University (JD)
- Profession: Lawyer, politician, federal judge

Leonard E. Davis (born 1948) is an American lawyer and former judge. He served as Chief Justice of the Twelfth Court of Appeals of Texas, from 2000–2002, and was nominated by George W. Bush on January 23, 2002 to the U.S. District Court for the Eastern District of Texas until his retirement May 15, 2015.

== Background ==
Born in Fort Worth, Texas, Davis received a Bachelor of Arts degree in mathematics from the University of Texas at Arlington in 1970, and his Master of Arts degree from Texas Christian University in 1974. Davis was also in the Texas Army National Guard from 1970 to 1973, and worked as a computer programmer and systems analyst for the Texas Electric Service Company prior to entering law school in 1974. He graduated cum laude and first in his class from Baylor Law School with a Juris Doctor in 1976, where he was editor-in-chief of the Baylor Law Review and a member of Baylor's interscholastic moot court and mock trial teams. At Baylor Law, he also received American Jurisprudence Awards for Excellence in Contracts and Federal Courts.

Davis was in private practice as a civil trial attorney in Tyler, Texas, for 23 years, from 1977 to 2000, and was Chief Justice of the Twelfth Court of Appeals of the State of Texas from 2000 to 2002.

== Judicial service ==
On January 23, 2002, Davis was nominated by President George W. Bush to a seat on the United States District Court for the Eastern District of Texas vacated by Paul N. Brown. Davis was confirmed by the United States Senate on May 9, 2002, and received his commission on May 10, 2002. He was sworn in on May 15, 2002. He served as Chief Judge from 2012 to 2015. He retired from active service on May 15, 2015. He was primarily assigned patent lawsuits in the U.S. district court.

Davis has served on the Fifth Circuit Judicial Council and the Federal Circuit Advisory Committee on Case Management. He was also Co-Chair of the Federal Judges Committee of the Federal Circuit Bar Association. In August 2015, Davis was appointed by Chief Judge Sharon Prost of the U.S. Court of Appeals for the Federal Circuit to serve a three-year term on the Federal Circuit's Advisory Council. Davis received the New York Intellectual Property Law Association's "Outstanding Public Service Award" in 2016 for his contributions to intellectual property law

=== Patent law ===
During his tenure on the federal bench, Davis presided over 1,700 patent cases and more than 250 Markman hearings (or claim construction hearings).

Among the significant patent decisions Davis ruled on during his tenure on the bench included the case of i4i v. Microsoft, which resulted in a $290 million willful infringement jury verdict against Microsoft, and which was further upheld on appeal by both the United States Court of Appeals for the Federal Circuit and the United States Supreme Court. In the case of VirnetX v. Apple, the jury rendered a $368 million verdict which was later overturned on appeal to the Federal Circuit. In the Eolas v. Adobe Systems, et al case, a patentee seeking a royalty on the entire "interactive web" was defeated in a trial in which Web inventor Tim Berners-Lee testified for the defense.

From 2015 and on, Davis serves as of counsel at the law firm Fish & Richardson.

Legal offices
| Preceded by Paul N. Brown | Judge of the United States District Court for the Eastern District of Texas; 2002–2015 | Succeeded by J. Campbell Barker |
| Preceded by David Folsom | Chief Judge of the United States District Court for the Eastern District of Texas; 2012–2015 | Succeeded by Ron Clark |
