= David Stubbeman =

American politician

Member of the Texas House of Representatives from the 62nd district
- In office January 14, 1975 – January 9, 1979
- Preceded by: Frank Calhoun
- Succeeded by: Gary Thompson

Personal details
- Born: August 28, 1938 Midland, Texas
- Died: September 11, 2010 (aged 72) Abilene, Texas
- Party: Democratic

David Stubbeman (August 28, 1938 – September 11, 2010) was an American politician who served in the Texas House of Representatives from the 62nd district from 1975 to 1979.

He died on September 11, 2010, in Abilene, Texas at age 72.
