= 490th Civil Affairs Battalion =

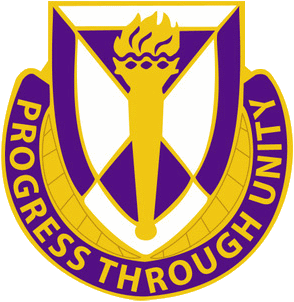
- Distinctive unit insignia
- Active: 1945-46; 1955–present
- Country: United States
- Branch: United States Army
- Type: Civil Affairs
- Size: Battalion
- Part of: 321st CA Brigade, 350th CA Command, USACAPOC(A)
- Garrison/HQ: Grand Prairie Armed Forces Reserve Complex
- Nicknames: "Cimic Dawgs" & "Panama Dawgs" (unofficial)
- Motto: Progress Through Unity
- Engagements: Occupation of Japan Operation Iraqi Freedom: Liberation of Iraq; Transition of Iraq; National Resolution; Iraqi Surge; Iraqi Sovereignty; Operation Enduring Freedom
- Decorations: Meritorious Unit Commendation; Army Superior Unit Award; Valorous Unit Award

Commanders
- Current commander: LTC Christopher Weinbel

Insignia
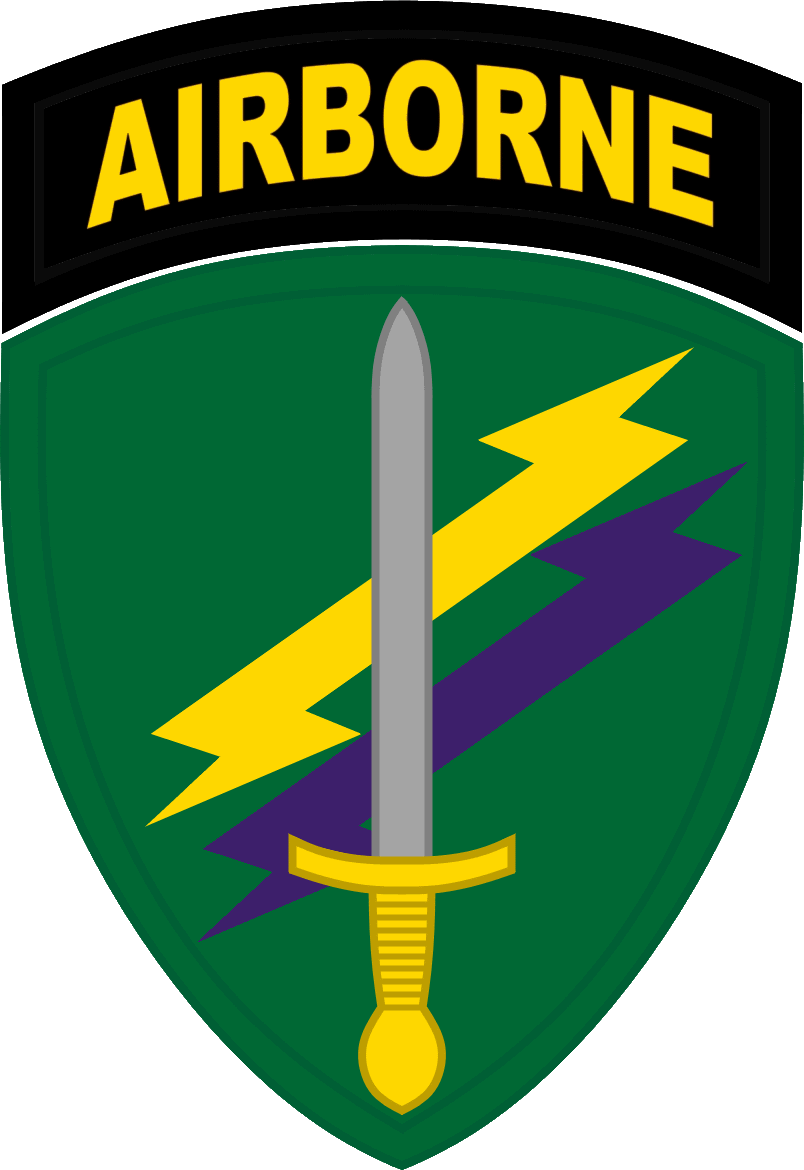
- USACAPOC shoulder sleeve insignia

The 490th Civil Affairs Battalion is a civil affairs (CA) unit of the United States Army Reserve located at the Grand Prairie Armed Forces Reserve Complex in Grand Prairie, Texas and organized under the 321st Civil Affairs Brigade, 350th Civil Affairs Command, United States Army Civil Affairs and Psychological Operations Command (Airborne) or USACAPOC. The 490th is composed of Headquarters and Headquarters Company (HHC) and its four tactical companies, Alpha, Bravo, Charlie, and Delta. The unit was activated for service during World War II, the Berlin Crisis, and Operation Iraqi Freedom (OIF).

== Origins ==
=== Activation ===
The ancestral unit of the 490th Civil Affairs Battalion was constituted in the Army of the United States as the Headquarters and Headquarters Detachment, 90th Military Government Company (also known as the 90th Military Government in some documents) and activated 25 August 1945 at the Presidio of Monterey, California, just days after Japan's surrender.

=== World War II ===
==== Presidio of Monterey ====
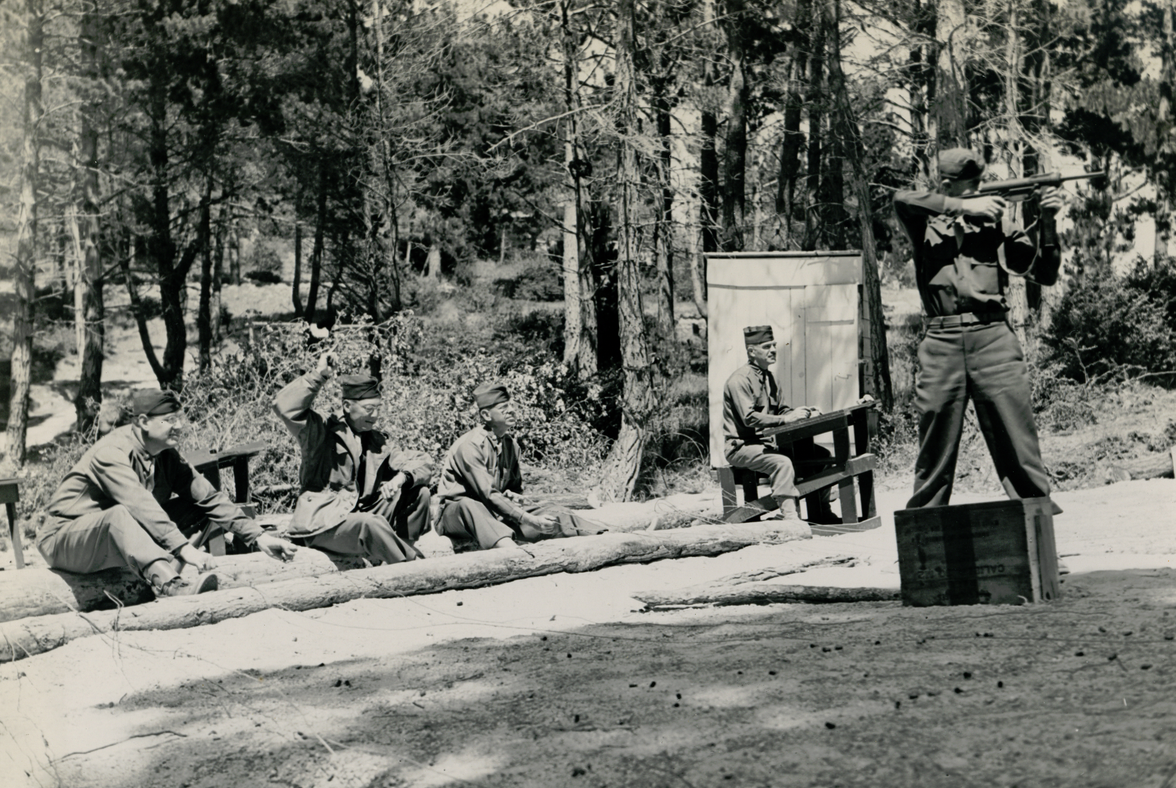
Civil Affairs Staging Area soldiers train with the M3A1 submachine gun.

The Presidio of Monterrey served as the central mobilization and holding site for all Military Government and Civil Affairs forces from all branches of service (mainly US Navy and US Army) in response to the realization for a need to successfully manage the occupations of Europe and Japan for reconstruction. The training center was named the Civil Affairs Staging Area (CASA).

An August report from the commander of the CASA to the Civil Affairs Division (re-designated in 1960 as the Civil Affairs Branch) described physically demanding field exercises involving ruck marches, amphibious assault, scaling cliffs, and infiltration through perimeter defenses, which were "geared toward a possible invasion of Japan before military government teams could assume occupation duties."

==== Occupation of Japan ====
After Japan's surrender, the preparations for invasion proved unnecessary.

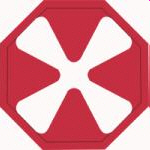
Eighth Army shoulder sleeve insignia

In December 1945, the 90th Military Government deployed to Japan under the Headquarters, Eighth United States Army and General Douglas MacArthur, the Supreme Commander of the Allied Powers (SCAP). Personnel likely wore the Eighth Army patch once they deployed to Japan.

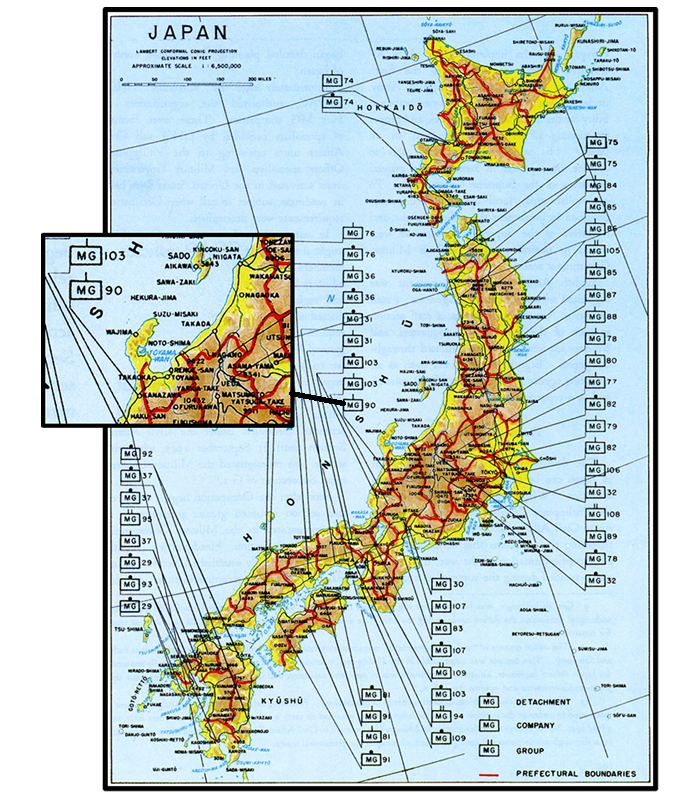
Overview of military government units in Japan, circa January 1946.

According to an operational map of military government units in Japan as of January 1946, the 90th Military Government is designated as a company-sized element operating in Kanazawa, Ishikawa Prefecture.

In Kanazawa, personnel of the 90th Military Government supported Japanese administrators, maintained public services for the populace, and secured local artifacts and monuments (such as Kanazawa Castle) from potential looting and black market operations.

=== Inactivation - 1946 ===
Within the first sixth months of occupation, MacArthur began to reposition and redistribute military government units to better meet the needs of the nation, as there were not enough elements in their initial configuration to cover all of the prefectures. By June 1946, all military government units in Japan were divided into newly created teams designated by their prefecture. The designations of most of the groups and companies were dropped and the team was the main military government organization deployed in Japan. With the reassignment of all of its personnel, the 90th Military Government Company effectively ceased to exist at this time. On 30 June 1946, the Army officially issued orders inactivating the 90th Military Government as a unit in the U.S. Army.

== Early Years in Abilene, Texas ==
=== Reactivation and redesignation ===
From 1946 on, prominent business, civic, and professional leaders of Abilene, Texas were involved in several Army Reserve, National Guard, and Marine Corps Reserve units. One of these units was Detachment 3, 4005th Army Reserve Area Service Unit (Station Complement). When that unit was inactivated several of the unit's prominent members worked to organize the 90th Military Government [Company] for reactivation in Abilene.

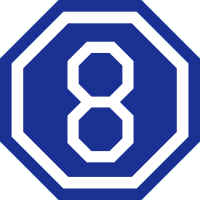
8th Army Corps shoulder sleeve insignia

The 90th Military Government Company was re-designated 2 November 1955 as the 490th Military Government, Headquarters and Headquarters Company, allotted to the US Army Reserve, and assigned to the Fourth Army (later re-designated as the Fourth United States Army) Area and aligned under the Eighth Army Corps. The unit was activated 1 December 1955. Special Orders Number 241, 13 December 1955, Headquarters, Texas Military District, Austin, provided for the official organization of the 490th Military Government in Abilene. The soldiers of the newly formed 490th bore the Shoulder Sleeve Insignia (SSI) of the Eighth Army Corps.

The unit was again re-designated on October 15, 1956 as the 490th Civil Affairs and Military Government Company and on October 20, 1959 as the 490th Civil Affairs Company, the designation it would hold for the next three decades.

Soldiers of the 490th trained at several locations initially, including the Elks Building in downtown Abilene, but in 1958, the Army acquired a facility in south Abilene that had served an oil exploration and drilling company since its construction in 1951. The facility was located on the old Ballenger Highway (now known as South Treadaway Boulevard). This facility housed the 490th, along with several other reserve and guard forces, for the next four decades.

=== Berlin Crisis - 1961-62 ===
When President Kennedy ordered the activation of 150,00 reservists in 1961 in response to mounting tensions with the Soviet Union over Berlin, the 490th Civil Affairs Company, along with several other Army Reserve Civil Affairs units, was mobilized to Fort Gordon, Georgia to train for possible deployment. The activation of the 490th was the first call up of Reserve or Guard troops from Abilene since World War II.

While the unit was not selected to deploy and was demobilized on August 11, 1962, soldiers of the 490th who were activated later received the National Defense Service Medal (NDSM) in 1967 for their active duty during this time period. Additionally, the 490th earned the Army Reserve Superior Unit Certificate [a defunct award] during this mobilization; this would be the first of many of these awards bestowed upon the 490th while the award was still actively issued within the Army Reserve.

== Cold War and 'Cimic Dawgs' - 1963-2000 ==
=== Citizen soldiers ===
During the next three decades of the 490th's service in the Army Reserve, the unit trained rigorously each year, heavily involved itself in supporting Abilene and the surrounding communities, and supported Civil Affairs operations in Vietnam, Panama, and Desert Storm with food and clothing drives to support humanitarian aid. Although the 490th was never activated as a unit for these conflicts, many individual soldiers from the 490th did serve overseas with other units.

Annual training sites ranged from Fort Gordon, Georgia to Fort Chaffee (in Arkansas) to Fort Wolters (in Mineral Wells, TX); often, short term training, land navigation, and weapons qualification for the unit occurred at Camp Barkeley. The grounds of the former Camp Barkeley reverted to private property and much of the garrison was removed, but the unit used the land for decades until the owners of the land could no longer allow military exercises to occur on the grounds.

Shoulder sleeve insignia of the 90th Infantry Division.

In 1963, the Army Reserve Training Center that housed the 490th and several other units was renamed the Grimes Memorial US Army Reserve Center. The name memorialized Captain Rudyard K. Grimes, an Abilene native and West Point graduate who served in the Pacific theater during World War II and was captured by the Japanese in the Philippines, facing the infamous Bataan Death March and perishing in a POW camp in 1942. From 1955 until 1971, the 490th was aligned under the Fourth United States Army until that major command was inactivated 30 June 1971. The 490th was then realigned to the Fifth United States Army.

For much of the time between 1955 and the 1980s, the 490th was assigned for command and control to the 90th Army Reserve Command (ARCOM) (now the 90th Sustainment Brigade), formerly known as the 90th Infantry Division. The soldiers of the 490th adopted the division's nickname of "Tough 'Ombres" and wore the shoulder patch of the 90th ARCOM during this era.

For a short period of time, the 490th directly reported to the 4254th Civil Affairs Group, also stationed in Abilene, until that unit was inactivated. The 490th was then transferred to the 312th Civil Affairs Group. That unit was later replaced by the 321st Civil Affairs Group in San Antonio, Texas, which was later redesignated the 321st Civil Affairs Brigade; all of these units were still organized under the 90th ARCOM and remained so until 1985.

Female soldiers from the Women's Army Corps who trained with the 490th participated with the unit in both the Solid Shield field exercise at Fort Bragg and the 1975 weapon's qualification. These were both historic firsts for these female soldiers and evidence that the Army was moving toward full integration of the "WACs" into the general ranks of the Army, with the exception of infantry units.

=== 'Cimic Dawgs' ===
==== Training to fight ====
During the decades of the 1970s and the 1980s, personnel from the 490th often conducted annual training exercises with other US Army elements in Germany. In the late 1980s the focus for training exercises shifted to supporting the 1st Cavalry and 4th Infantry Divisions in "Warfighter" exercises at Fort Hood, Texas to help those units maintain combat readiness and civil military operational capacity.

Throughout the service of members of the 490th in Germany, Fort Hood, JRTC, and NTC, supported units continuously held the 490th in high regard, and one annual training exercise resulted in a supported unit nicknaming the 490th the "Cimic Dawgs"; the members of the 490th continued to call themselves this with pride for many years. The nickname combined the term 'Cimic' for the international designation of Civil Affairs Operations, Civil-military cooperation and 'Dawgs" for the strong work ethic the 490th soldiers exhibited, with the soldiers said to 'work like dogs'.

==== USACAPOC - 1985 ====
In 1985, the 490th and all other levels of reserve Civil Affairs, Psychological Operations, and Special Forces units were reassigned under the US Army Reserve Special Operations Command (Airborne) or USARSOC headquartered at Fort Bragg, North Carolina. On 27 November 1990, the Special Forces units were realigned under a different component of the US Army Special Operations Command (Airborne) (USASOC). The command headquarters and the remaining Civil Affairs and Psychological Operations forces were re-designated as the US Army Civil Affairs and Psychological Operations Command (Airborne) or USACAPOC, forming one of four major subordinate commands of USASOC. Under USCAPOC, the 490th was allotted to the 353rd Civil Affairs Command, out of Staten Island, New York, and under that command remained assigned to the 321st CA Brigade.

Members of the 490th still wear the USACAPOC shoulder sleeve insignia.

==== Panama and Desert Storm - 1989-92 ====
Since 29 December 1989, several unit members were ordered to active duty for various operations such as Operation Just Cause in Panama and Desert Storm in Saudi Arabia. These soldiers were attached to other units or sent on individual orders for these operations but retained their sense of identity with the 490th, and both groups of soldiers, upon returning from their mobilizations, presented the battalion with plaques commemorating their service, respectively, as "Panama Dawgs" and "Desert Dawgs."

==== Reorganized as battalion - 1993 ====
The 490th was reorganized and redesignated 16 September 1992 as Headquarters and Headquarters Detachment, 490th Civil Affairs Battalion, expanding the unit in size and mission. Concurrently, subordinate units General Support Detachment and Direct Support Detachment were constituted and organized (sometimes alternately known and later officially re-designated respectively as Alpha Company and Bravo Company). Direct Support was doctrinally charged with tasks now associated with civil affairs generalist operations, while General Support contained specialized teams for legal, medical, and education support of host nation governments.

The 490th provided a detachment of 23 soldiers under the flag of the 321st Civil Affairs Brigade in December 1998 to support Operation Joint Guard in Bosnia-Herzegovina.

== Global War on Terror - 2001 to present ==
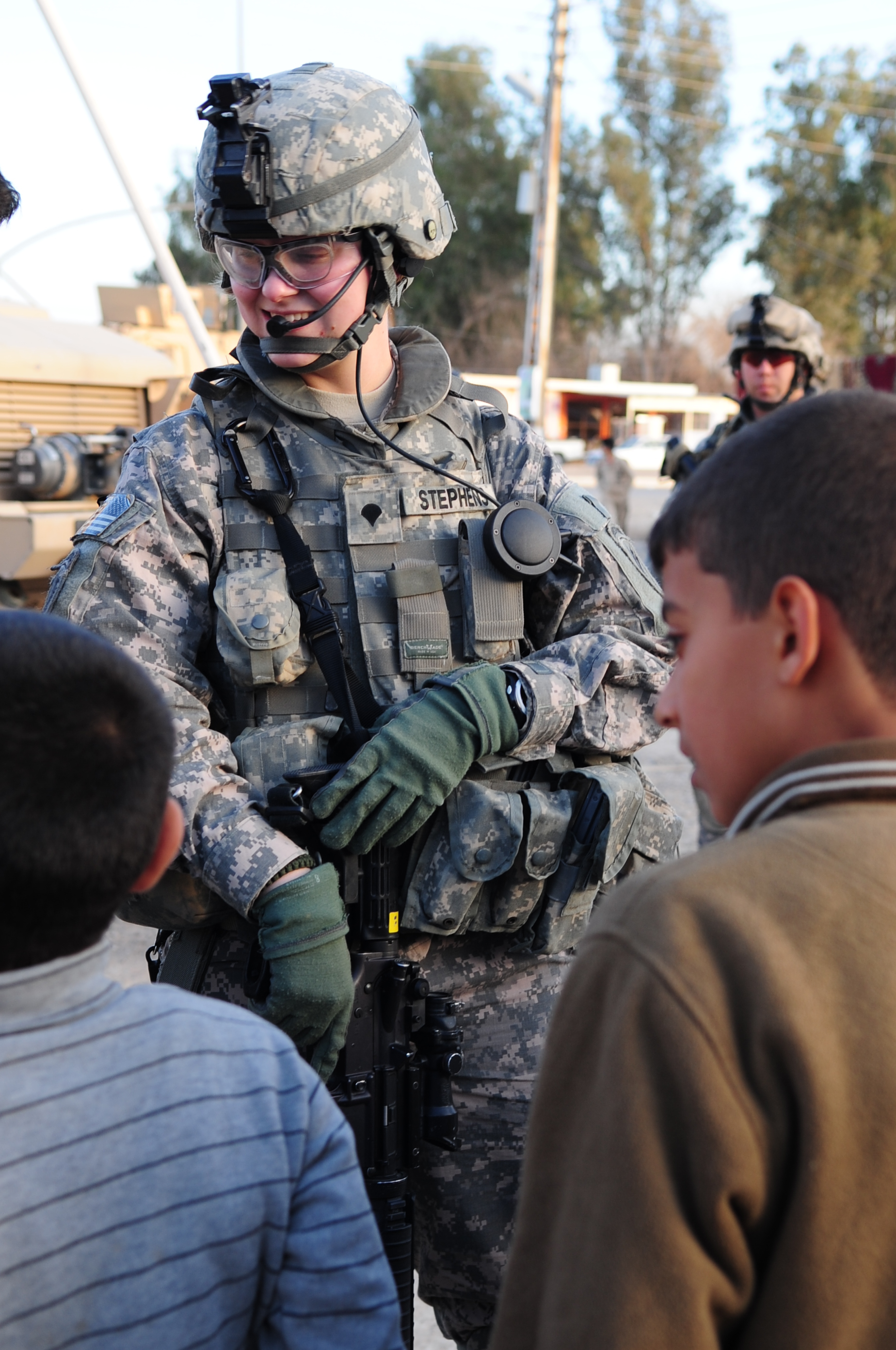
Spc. Cassie Stephens, Alpha Company, 490th Civil Affairs Battalion talks with children in Samarra, Iraq during a patrol on in 2009.

=== Operation Iraqi Freedom ===
After the terrorist attacks of September 11, 2001, the US Army began reorganizing and consolidating its force structure in response to invading and occupying Afghanistan. USCAPOC, by this point, was already reorganizing its forces in efforts to remain prepared for deployment and expand to meet an increasing demand for Civil Affairs support. By 2002, the 490th, along with the 321st CA BDE, was realigned from the 353rd Civil Affairs Command (CACOM) to the 351st Civil Affairs Command (CACOM) out of Mountain View, California.

In March 2003, the 490th as a battalion, including Headquarters, General Support, and Direct Support Detachments deployed to Iraq as part of OIF I and remained through early 2004. Elements of the 490th were heavily involved in efforts to control and improve volatile and key places in Iraq, including the Baghdad Zoo, Sadr City, the Baghdad International Airport (BIAP), and the city of Fallujah that was later the site of a famous battle. Two members of the 490th received the Purple Heart and were medically discharged from military service for wounds received in action from improvised explosive devices (Staff Sergeant Ryan Kelly and CPT Allen Vaught).

Direct Support Detachment, or Detachment B (now known as Bravo Company), later received the Valorous Unit Award for its actions in support of the 3rd Armored Cavalry Regiment in Al Anbar Province.

The battalion was released from active duty in early 2004 and returned to reserve status.

In 2005, the battalion's subordinate units were reorganized and redesignated as the following: Headquarters and Headquarters Company, Alpha Company (formerly General Support), and Bravo Company (formerly Direct Support).

Alpha and Bravo were ordered to active duty and in July 2005 deployed in support of Operation Iraqi Freedom IV. During this deployment, one soldier, Specialist Christopher Wade, received the Purple Heart for wounds to his right hand during a roadside bomb attack on his vehicle, but was able to return to duty and complete the deployment.

The 490th saw members of the unit killed in action for the first time in its history. Major Gregory Fester of Alpha Company was killed on 30 August 2005 when an improvised explosive device (IED) detonated beside him during a dismounted patrol. On 19 September 2005, Sergeant First Class Lawrence Morrison of Alpha Company sustained severe injuries when an IED destroyed his vehicle in Taji, Iraq, and he died of those injuries later that day. Sadly, one week before the 490th's deployed elements were to leave country, First Sergeant Carlos Saenz and Specialist Teodoro Torres (and three members from the unit replacing them) were killed on 28 April 2006 when an IED struck their vehicle and caused it to roll into oncoming traffic in Baghdad.

Alpha and Bravo Companies were released from active duty in August 2006 and returned to reserve status.

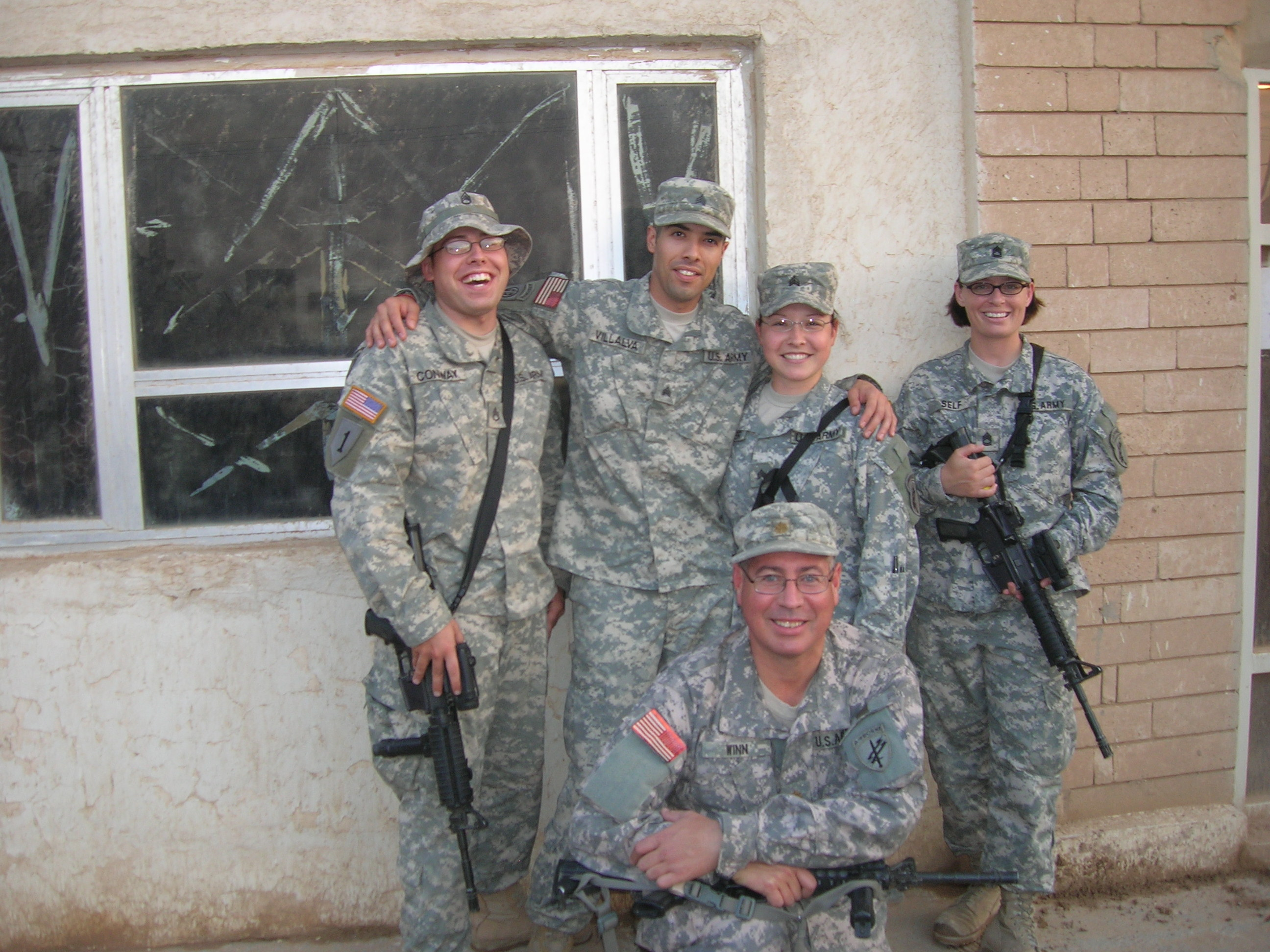
SSG Conway and SSG Villalva taken before shipping off to designated location in Iraq.

24 July 2008, the battalion was reorganized as Headquarters and Headquarters Company, 490th Civil Affairs Battalion, with subordinate units Alpha Company, Bravo Company, and Charlie Company concurrently constituted and organized. At the same time, Alpha, Bravo, and Charlie Companies were ordered to active duty and deployed 12 October 2008 in support of Operation Iraqi Freedom. Until the official orders were issued to authorize Charlie Company, the unit was known officially as "Detachment 2, Bravo Company," though the 490th referred to the unit unofficially as Charlie in the interim.

On 12 July 2009, near the end of the deployment, SSG Alan Conway was injured by a roadside bomb while on dismounted patrol in support of Bravo Company, 2nd Battalion,27th Infantry Regiment, 3rd Brigade, 25th Infantry Division in Sharqat, Iraq. He was medically evacuated and received the Purple Heart.

On 13 July 2009 SSG Jose Villalva, Civil Affairs Team A/490th CA BN assigned to FOB Altruz was attacked by an Improvised Explosive Device (IED). The attack occurred while he was conducting OPN Sandstorm. The patrol SSG Villalva was on was redirected from their assigned mission to the POO in support of CIDF when his vehicle was hit by an IED. He received the Combat Action Badge

Alpha, Bravo, and Charlie Companies returned in August 2009 and resumed reserve status.

=== Operation Enduring Freedom and Operation Balikatan - 2006 ===
In 2006, soldiers from the 490th volunteered to deploy with other units to Afghanistan in support of Operation Enduring Freedom. Also in 2006, the 490th sent a detachment of five soldiers (two headquarters personnel and one civil affairs team) to support the 451st Civil Affairs Battalion in the annual Operation Balikatan (which means "Shoulder to Shoulder") exercise, a joint effort between US special operations personnel and Filipino military assets in the southern islands of the Philippines in the region of Jolo to deny assets to Al Qaeda and aid in defeating them.

=== Relocations ===
In the summer of 2006, the battalion headquarters, headquarters company, and Alpha Company were relocated to Dallas, Texas, with Bravo Company remaining stationed in Abilene, Texas. Headquarters and Headquarters Company and Alpha Company were stationed at the Herzog US Army Reserve Center in South Dallas (on Lancaster Road near the Dallas VA Hospital in the Dallas area known as Oak Cliff) until the Herzog center was closed.

At the same time, USACAPOC (A) and its subordinate reserve forces, including the 490th, were realigned from USASOC(A) to the US Army Reserve Command. USACAPOC(A) re-aligned the 490th and the rest of the 321st CA Brigade from the 351st to the 350th CACOM out of Pensacola, Florida.

In relocating to Dallas, the 490th left behind six decades of history and a rich military community in Abilene, but gained an advantage in recruiting personnel for planned expansions of the 490th that would double its size and increase its readiness for deployment and mission capacity.

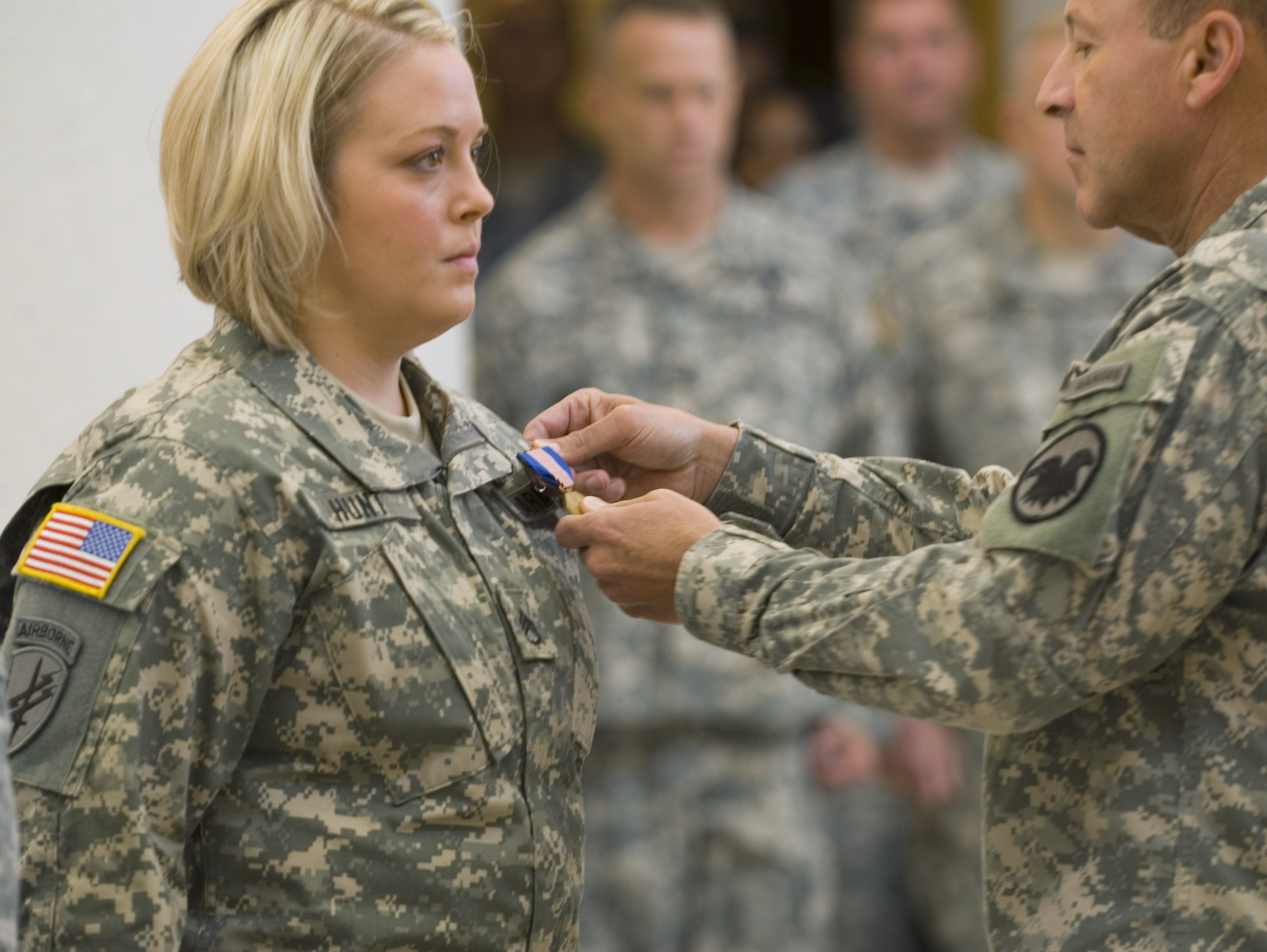
Staff Sergeant Hunt receives the Soldiers Medal from Major General Alan D. Bell.

In 2008, SSG Jacqueline Hunt of the 490th received the Soldier's Medal. Hunt was driving home on a freeway near Fort Worth when she observed and administered live-saving first-aid to a man involved in a severe accident The Soldier's Medal is the seventh highest decoration given to soldiers and recognizes acts of heroism not involving combat operations.

In May 2010, the 490th Civil Affairs Battalion was relocated to Grand Prairie, Texas to the Grand Prairie Armed Forces Reserve Complex (AFRC), located on grounds formerly part of the historic Dallas Naval Air Station. At this time the battalion was reorganized and redesignated as Headquarters and Headquarters Company, 490th Civil Affairs Battalion (Tactical), with subordinate units Alpha, Bravo, Charlie, and Delta Companies concurrently constituted and organized.

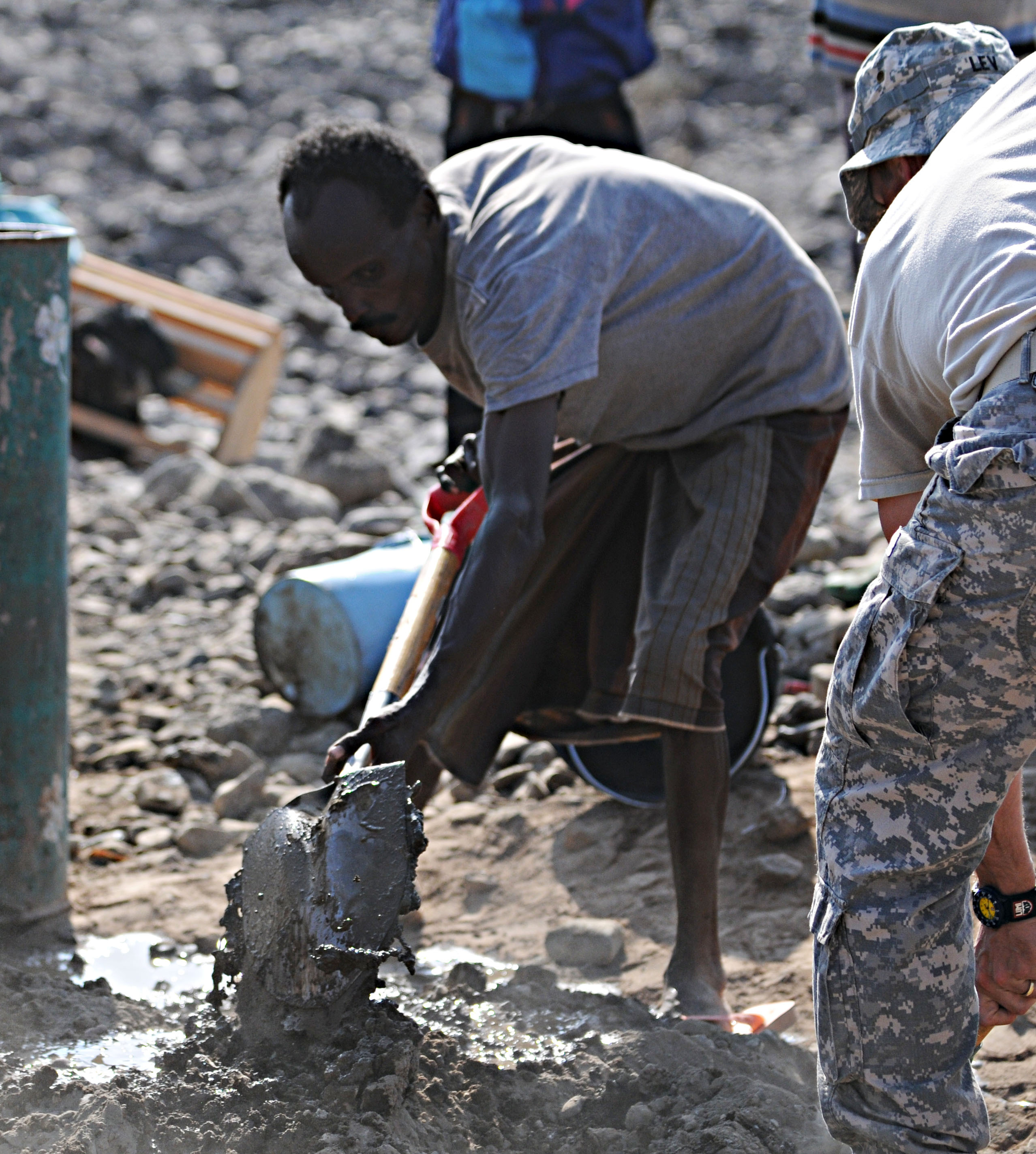
490th Civil Affairs Battalion soldiers in Djibouti.

All elements were relocated to Grand Prairie and none remained in Abilene or Dallas. The training facilities and many personnel from the 490th that were located in Abilene were transferred to the control of the 413th Civil Affairs Battalion in Lubbock, Texas. The 490th joined several Army Reserve, Army National Guard, and Marine Corps Reserve units at the Grand Prairie facility on the eastern portion of the land the Dallas Naval Air Station and Hensley Field encompassed.

As of 2016, the 490th remains stationed at the Grand Prairie facility.

=== Horn of Africa - 2011 ===
Beginning in August 2011, the 490th deployed some of its elements, including Charlie and Delta Companies to support the Horn of Africa mission in Djibouti. Charlie and Delta returned and resumed reserve status in 2012.

== Campaign participation credit ==
Campaign	Units	Campaign phases	Status
War on Terrorism	HHC, A, B, C & D Companies	To be determined for 2003 to present, including 2003 Iraq deployment and 2011 deployment of Charlie and Delta Companies to the Horn of Africa.	Credit due
Operation Iraqi Freedom	HHC, A & B Companies	Phase 1: Liberation of Iraq Phase 2: Transition of Iraq for 2003 to 2004 deployment	Pending credit
Operation Iraqi Freedom	A & B Companies	Phase 4: National Resolution for 2005 to 2006 deployment	Pending credit
Operation Iraqi Freedom	A & B Companies	Phase 5: Iraqi Surge Phase 6: Iraqi Sovereignty for 2008 to 2009 deployment	Pending credit
