= Administrative divisions of Wisconsin =

Political and government structures

Municipalities map showing counties, cities, villages, and towns in Wisconsin

The administrative divisions of Wisconsin include counties, cities, villages and towns. In Wisconsin, all of these are units of general-purpose local government. There are also a number of special-purpose districts formed to handle regional concerns, such as school districts.

Whether a community is a city, village or town is not strictly dependent on the community's population or area, but on the form of government selected by the residents and approved by the Wisconsin State Legislature. These Cities and villages can overlap county boundaries; for example, the city of Whitewater is located in Walworth and Jefferson counties. The Wisconsin State Legislature largely defines the powers and duties of these municipalities as well.

== County ==
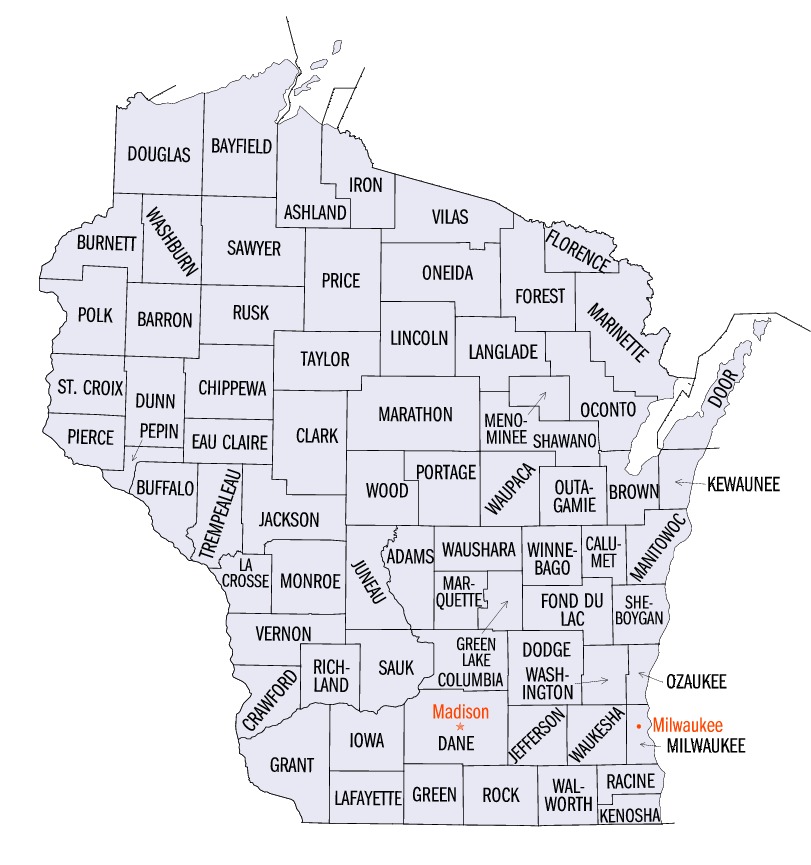
Wisconsin counties (clickable map)

The county is the primary political subdivision of Wisconsin. Every county has a county seat, often a populous or centrally located city or village, where the government offices for the county are located. Within each county are cities, villages and towns. As of 2016, Wisconsin had 72 counties.

A Board of Supervisors is the main legislative entity of the county. Supervisors are elected in nonpartisan elections for two-year terms (except in Milwaukee County where the Milwaukee County Board of Supervisors served four years). In May 2013, the Wisconsin Legislature passed a bill that will reduce the terms of office from four years to two years for the Milwaukee County Board of Supervisors. The type of executive official in each county varies: 11 counties have a County Executive elected in a nonpartisan election for a four-year term; 20 counties have appointed County Administrators; and 41 have appointed Administrative Coordinators. Other officials include sheriffs, district attorneys, clerks, treasurers, coroners, surveyors, registers of deeds, and clerks of circuit court; these officers are elected for four-year terms. But in most counties, elected coroners have been replaced by appointed medical examiners. The Wisconsin state law permits counties to appoint a registered land surveyor in place of electing a surveyor.

Counties are generally responsible for social services, such as child welfare, job training, and care of the elderly; and public land management, such as care of parks. Law enforcement and road maintenance are also administered by the county, in conjunction with local municipalities. While cities and villages have certain powers based on the Wisconsin state constitution, the state legislature has granted various powers to counties and towns. These powers represent the sum of what counties can do and it is feasible that the legislature could revoke particular powers. (In short, cities and villages have home rule but counties and towns do not.)

As of October 18, 2022, 68 of the state's 72 counties also maintain their own sales tax separate from the state for items such as local county road maintenance, usually averaging around .1-.5% in addition to the state 5% sales tax.

== City ==
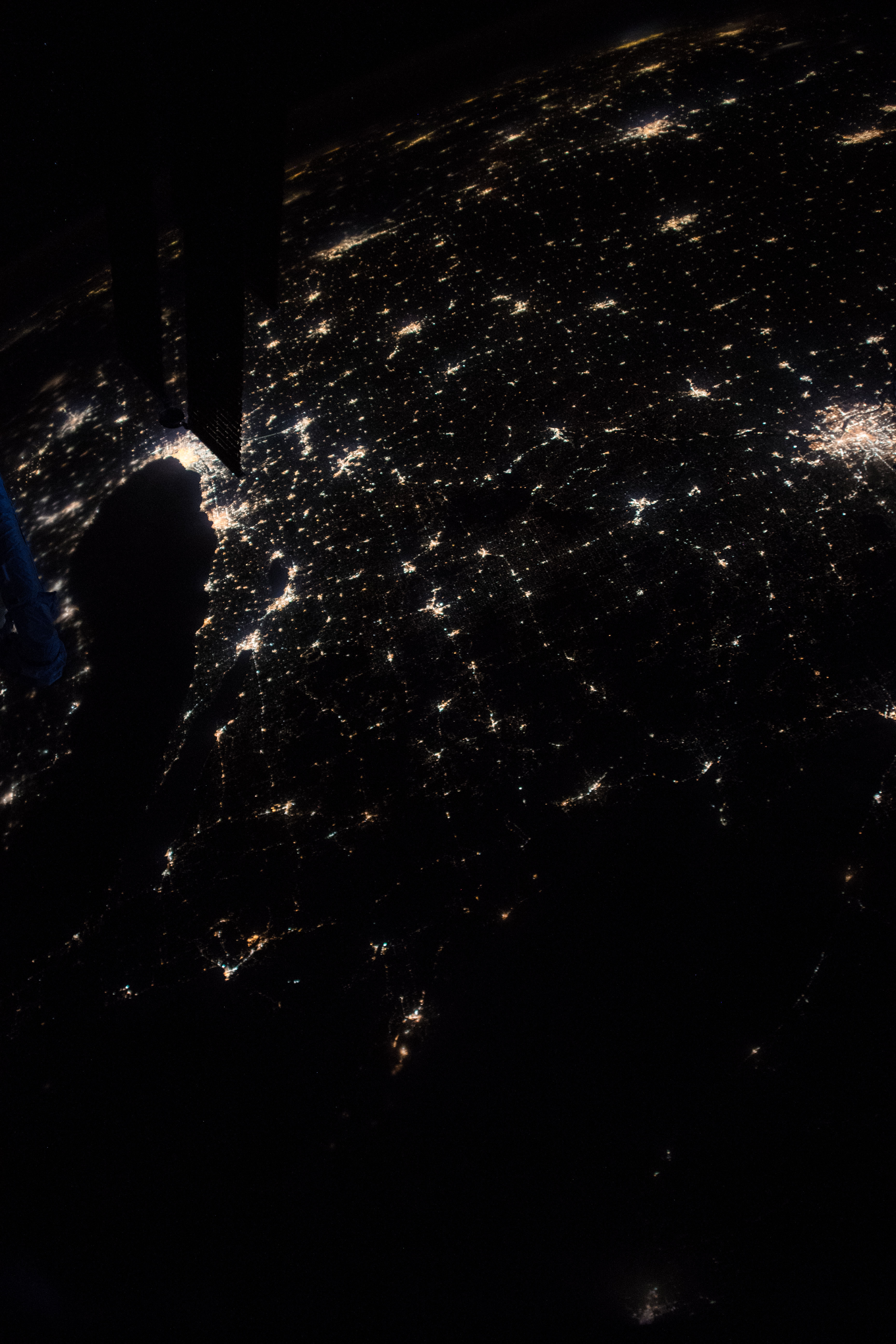
Cities of Wisconsin at 8:55:11 pm CST in 2018. Several cities pictured which are not in Wisconsin include Chicago (upper left near the solar panel) and Minneapolis (far right).

In Wisconsin, a city is an autonomous incorporated area within one or more counties. It provides almost all services to its residents and has the highest degree of home rule and taxing jurisdiction of all municipalities. Cities are generally more urbanized than towns. As of 2015, Wisconsin had 190 cities.

The home rule authority granted to cities allows them to make their own decision about their affairs, administration and much of their public policy, subject to state law.

Cities can choose to hire a city administrator or city manager, instead of electing a mayor. In cities that have city administrators, the head of the common council may be referred to as mayor. Cities are governed by Common or City Councils consisting of the mayor or city manager and elected aldermen or council members. City officers include mayor or city manager, treasurer, clerk, attorney, and health officials. Cities may also, by their discretion, have an engineer, comptroller, assessors, street commissioner, and a board of public works.

Cities in Wisconsin are divided into four classes:

- First class: Cities with 150,000 or more residents
- Second class: Cities with 39,000 to 149,999 residents
- Third class: Cities with 10,000 to 38,999 residents
- Fourth class: Cities with 9,999 or fewer residents

There are exceptions to these classes, however; in order for a city to move from one class to the next, certain governmental changes need to take place and the mayor must publish a proclamation. For these reasons, Madison is a second class city, even though it exceeds the 150,000 resident threshold, and several cities with a population of over 10,000 are fourth class cities.

In order to incorporate as a city, a community must have at least 1,000 citizens if it is in a rural area or 5,000 if it is in an urban area. Cities are able to expand their area by annexing land from towns when land owners request local service.

== Village ==
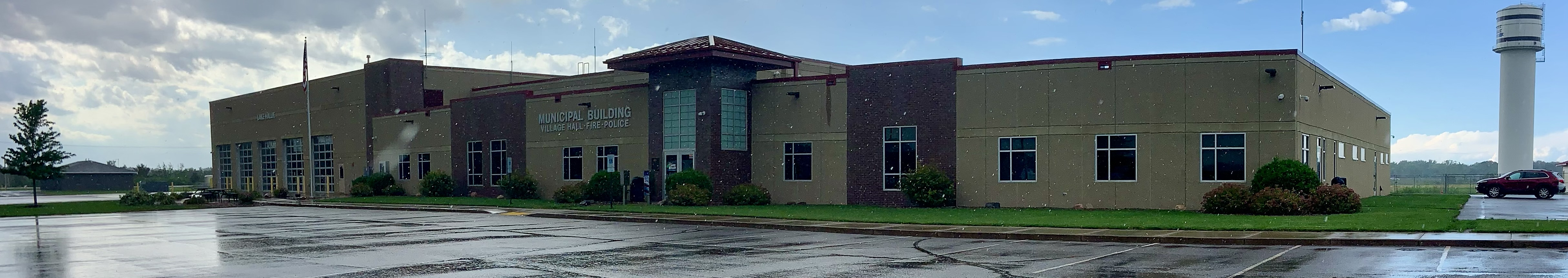
Lake Hallie Village Hall, fire department, and police station.

In Wisconsin, a village is an autonomous incorporated area within one or more counties. It provides various services to its residents and has a degree of home rule and taxing jurisdiction over them. As of 2015, Wisconsin had 407 villages.

In order to incorporate as a village, a community must have at least 150 citizens if it is in a rural area or 2,500 if it is in an urban area. The home rule authority granted to villages allows them to make their own decisions about their affairs, administration and much of their public policy, subject to state law.

Article body Article Draft In the year 1871 and also 1892 The constitutional amendments were adopted because they helped prohibit the Legislature from incorporating any city, village, or town by a special act.

Villages are governed by a Village President and a board of trustees. Village officers include a president, clerk, treasurer, and assessor. Villages may also elect to hire a village manager to oversee day-to-day operations instead of an elected village president; nine villages had done this as of 2015. An additional 77 villages in Wisconsin employ village administrators.

== Town ==
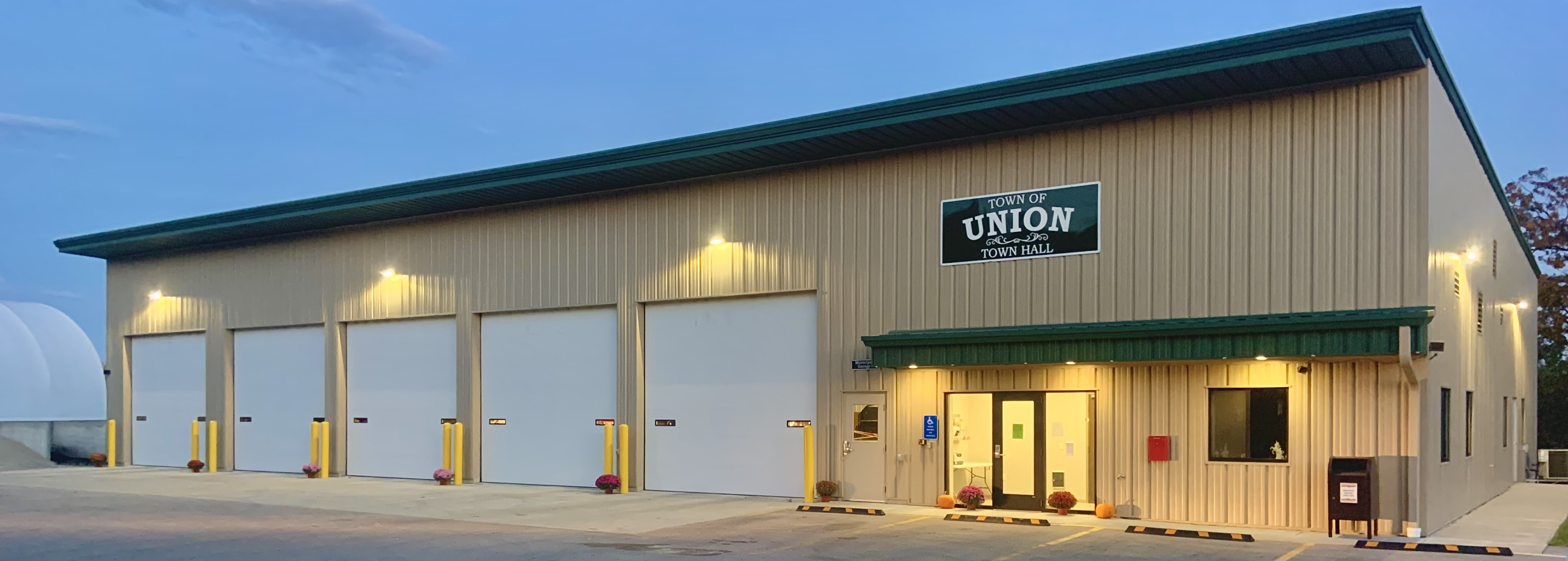
Union Town Hall in Rock County, Wisconsin.

In Wisconsin, a town is an unincorporated jurisdiction within a county; Wisconsin towns are thus similar to civil townships in most other states. All residents of Wisconsin who do not live in a city or village live in a town. Towns provide a limited number of services to their residents. The U.S. Census Bureau considers Wisconsin towns to be minor civil divisions. As of 2015, Wisconsin had 1,255 towns. Towns often have the same names as adjacent cities or villages. For example, the unincorporated Town of Cedarburg is adjacent to the city of Cedarburg, and the Town of New Glarus completely surrounds the village of New Glarus. There may also be more than one town in the state (although not within the same county) with the same name. For example, there are towns named Albion in Dane County, Jackson County, and Trempealeau County.

Towns have less authority than villages and cities; they do not, for instance, have home rule granted to them by the state, but instead have only the specific powers granted to them under state statute. At the minimum, towns maintain their roads, and may maintain either volunteer or "municipal" fire departments, where the firehouse is maintained by the town government. Towns may choose to engage in zoning or provide more services, however, overlapping with those provided by the county. In most cases, towns provide limited services and thus town residents often pay lower taxes than their city or village counterparts. Some towns have been authorized to exercise village powers, increasing their authority.

Towns are governed by Town Boards, with the board chairperson at its head. These boards normally consist of three supervisors, though towns with village powers or more than 2,500 people may have up to five supervisors. Town supervisors are elected every two years. Towns also have clerks, treasurers and assessors either elected or appointed by the board. In addition, every town must hold an annual town meeting in the beginning of April. At this town meeting, the electors may authorize the town board to take certain actions or change the make up or wages of town supervisors or officers.

Towns are often annexed by neighboring cities and villages in whole or in part. In Brown County, the Town of Preble was incorporated wholly into the city of Green Bay in 1964, thus terminating its status as a town. Piecemeal annexation has left some rather small towns, such as the Town of Germantown which covers 1.7 square miles (4.4 km^{2}), or the Town of Brookfield covering 5.5 square miles (14.2 km^{2}). This contrasts with the Town of Winter which covers 279.5 square miles (723.9 km^{2}). Most towns are about the size of a survey township, or 36 square miles (93 km^{2}). The Town of Menominee is unique in that it is co-extensive with the County of Menominee, and covers 365 square miles (945 km^{2}); this is due to its unique history and connection with the Menominee Indian Reservation.

In southern Wisconsin, towns are often co-terminus with survey townships, which were established to plat land. Survey townships are not political jurisdictions. The survey, or Congressional, townships, were mapped in the Public Land Survey System, and are subdivided into 36 sections of one square mile each. In Wisconsin, the grid system is based on a Point of Beginning (POB) created by surveyor Lucius Lyon in 1831 near Hazel Green, Wisconsin (the Fourth Principal Meridian) and used the Illinois boundary for a baseline. Development based on this grid system can be seen on maps today as the major through streets, such as those in Milwaukee, which coincide with boundary intersections. Lyon's POB is observed by a Wisconsin Historical Marker and a reset surveyor's monument.

Towns are the only unit of government that allows residents to direct decision by voting at local meetings. Towns tend to be sparsely populated. The most populous town in Wisconsin is Grand Chute which has the services, taxes, and urban character that are typically found in cities. When towns reach a size sufficient to make their form of government difficult to sustain, they frequently incorporate into a village or city, as the village of Fox Crossing did in 2016, or as the village of Kronenwetter did in 2002–2003.

See also urban town, a proposal for semi-incorporation of more urbanized towns.

== Unincorporated communities ==
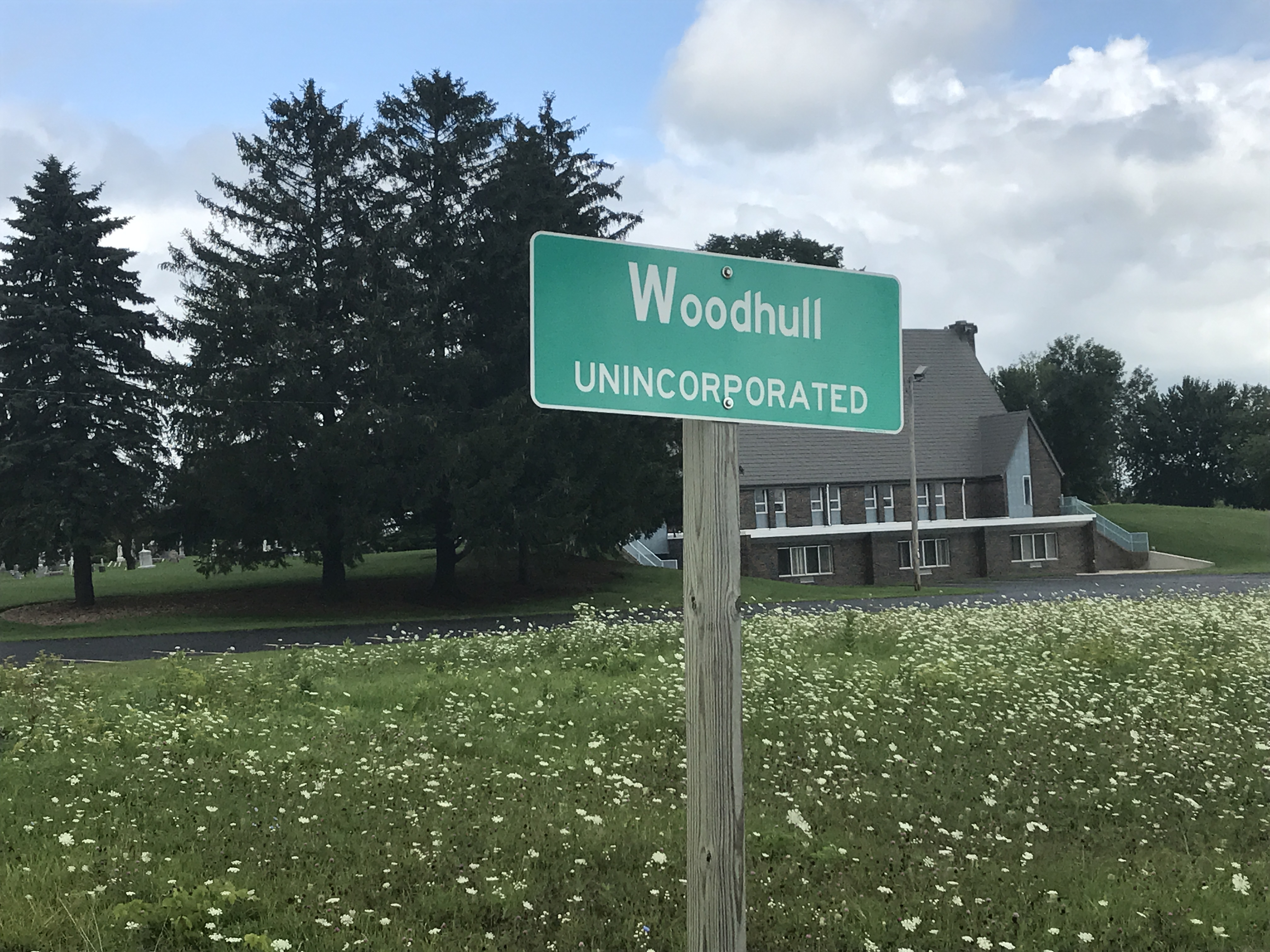
Sign showing Woodhull

There are numerous examples of unincorporated communities throughout the state. These areas are administered by the town or municipality in which they exist. They serve as useful local reference to specific places and are sometimes included in vital records. Many of these named places contain a small cluster of houses, a church or local business such as store or tavern. Although they do not have any governmental function, most are recognized for the common usage and are marked with official green informational highway signs listing the place name with the word 'Unincorporated' underneath. Many of these named places are also placed on the official Wisconsin state highway maps issued by the Wisconsin Department of Transportation but these names were not listed in the index on the same maps until several years ago. Examples include Frog Station, Poland, and North Leeds.

== Special purpose units of government ==
In Wisconsin, special purpose units of government provide specialized services for those who live within the district. They are empowered to tax residents of the district for the services provided in common. Special districts often cross the lines of cities, villages and towns. In 2006, Wisconsin had over 1,100 special districts.

These special units of government are created to address issues that are regional in nature, and sometimes to bypass the limits on debt that each municipality may have. The state can also exert more control on special districts through the governor's appointments to district boards. Politicians also set up some special districts to insulate themselves from the sometimes unpopular taxes these boards levy, since the boards are often appointed and not elected.

=== School districts ===
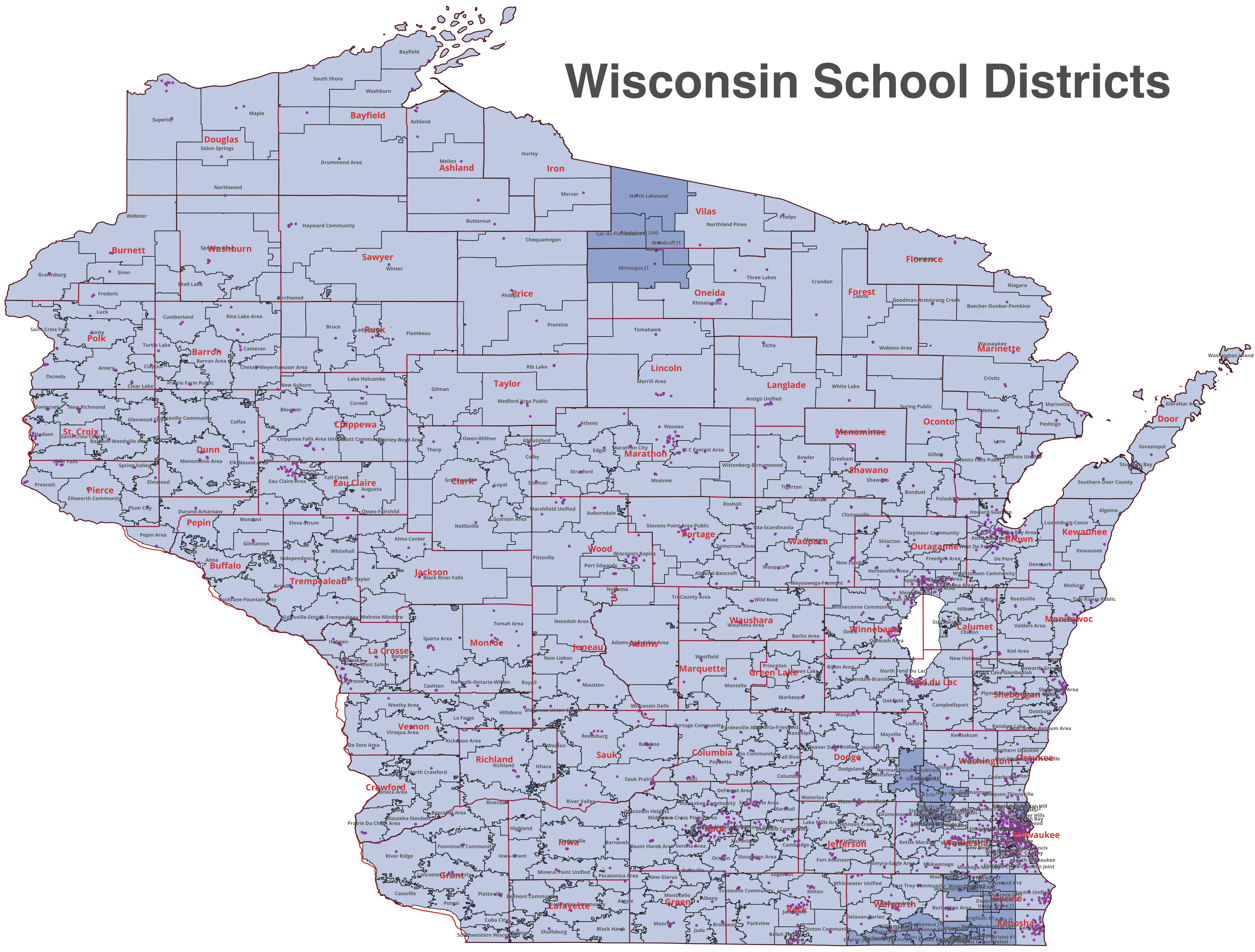
Wisconsin School Districts. Black lines are school district boundaries, red lines are county lines, and the dots are public school locations.

School districts are the most common kind of special district. They provide, arrange or contract for all public education services, including special education and school transportation, the latter also for non-public schools. In 2006, Wisconsin had more than 440 school districts.

School districts are often not precisely co-extensive with municipalities that bear the same name, meaning that a child living in a municipality might attend a school associated with a different municipality, or even a different county. Residents pay school taxes to the same school district in which they live and in which their children attend school.

=== Technical college districts ===
Wisconsin's sixteen technical college districts levy taxes to fund the Wisconsin Technical College System. These sixteen technical colleges provide occupational training for their residents.

=== Sports districts ===
The Southeast Wisconsin Professional Baseball Park District and the Professional Football Stadium District were created to raise money for the building of Miller Park and Lambeau Field, respectively.

The baseball district built, operates and manages the stadium used by the Milwaukee Brewers. It financed its activities through the sale of bonds, which were repaid from funds generated by a 0.1% sales and use tax on goods valued at over $10.00 sold in the district. The tax was in effect in the counties of Milwaukee, Ozaukee, Racine, Washington and Waukesha from 1996 to 2020.

The football district issued bonds to renovate the stadium used by the Green Bay Packers. It repaid its bonds through a 0.5% sales tax on goods sold in the district, which was coextensive with Brown County and was discontinued in 2015, with extraneous revenue at the time distributed to cities in Brown County.

=== Other types of special-purpose units ===
- Sewerage districts: The Milwaukee Metropolitan Sewerage District runs the sewage system for much of the Milwaukee metropolitan area. It receives its funding from property taxes and user fees.
- Cultural arts districts: The Wisconsin Center District owns and operates the U.S. Cellular Arena, Milwaukee Theatre and the Wisconsin Center in Milwaukee, along with the Fiserv Forum with the Milwaukee Bucks. The Madison Cultural Arts District manages the Overture Center for the Arts in Madison.

Other types of special districts include:

- Metropolitan planning organizations (MPOs)
- Regional planning commissions (RPCs)
- Drainage districts
- Sanitary districts
- Mosquito control districts
- Housing authorities

== See also ==
- List of counties in Wisconsin
- List of cities in Wisconsin
- List of villages in Wisconsin
- List of towns in Wisconsin
