= DCDB =

DCDB may refer to:

- Digital Cadastral DataBase
- Direct Current Distribution Board
- Dickenson County Discussion Board
