= Metes and bounds =

Method of describing land in deeds and other records

Metes and bounds is a system or method of describing land, real property (in contrast to personal property) or real estate. The system has been used in England for many centuries and is still used there in the definition of general boundaries. The system is also used in the Canadian province of Ontario, and throughout Canada for the description of electoral districts. By custom, it was applied in the original Thirteen Colonies that became the United States, and in many other jurisdictions that adopted land administration and legal practice based on English common law, including Zimbabwe, South Africa, India and Bangladesh. While still in hand-me-down use, this system has been largely overtaken in the past few centuries by newer systems such as rectangular (government survey) and lot and block (recorded plat).

Typically the system uses physical features of the local geography, along with directions and distances, to define and describe the boundaries of a parcel of land. The boundaries are described in a running prose style, working around the parcel in sequence, from a point of beginning, returning to the same point, comparable with the oral ritual of beating the bounds. It may include references to other adjoining parcels (and their owners), and it, in turn, could also be referred to in later surveys. At the time the description is compiled, it may have been marked on the ground with permanent monuments placed where there were no suitable natural monuments.

- Metes refers to boundaries defined by the measurement of straight runs, specified by a distance between the terminal points, and an orientation or direction. A direction may be a simple compass bearing or a precise orientation determined by accurate survey methods.
- Bounds (Abuttals and boundaries) refers to more general boundary descriptions, such as along a certain watercourse, a stone wall, an adjoining public road way, or an existing building. The system is often used to define larger pieces of property (e.g. farms) and political subdivisions (e.g. town boundaries) where precise definition is not required or would be far too expensive, or previously designated boundaries can be incorporated into the description.

== Usage ==
A typical description for a small parcel of land would be:

"Commencing at a corner at the intersection of two stone walls near an apple tree on the north side of Muddy Creek road one mile above the junction of Muddy and Indian Creeks, thence north for 150 rods to the end of the stone wall bordering the road, thence northwest along a line to a large standing rock on the corner of the property now or formerly belonging to John Smith, thence west 150 rods to the corner of a barn near a large oak tree, thence south to Muddy Creek road, thence down the side of the creek road to the point of commencement."

This sample description sequence begins with an identified corner serving as benchmark. The description then gives distance, direction and various boundary descriptions as if one were walking the bounds pacing off the distance to the next corner where there is a change of direction. Where watercourses form part of the bounds their meander is generally taken as a straight line between the established corners and their monuments.

In many deeds, the direction is described not by azimuth (a clockwise degree measure out of 360 degrees) but instead by bearing (a direction north or south followed by a degree measure out of 90 degrees and another direction west or east). For example, such a bearing might be listed as "N 42°35′ W", which means that the bearing is 42°35′ counterclockwise, or west of north. This has the advantage of providing the same degree measure regardless of which direction a particular boundary is being followed; the boundary can be traversed in the opposite direction simply by exchanging N for S and E for W. In other words, "N 42°35′ W" describes the same boundary as "S 42°35′ E" but is traversed in the opposite direction.

In most distance measures, especially those in older deeds and where measuring distances over a furlong, boundary lengths are listed in rods or poles instead of feet or meters. Rods and poles are equivalent measures equaling 16.5 feet. There are four rods in one chain. English surveyors carried chains (such as a Gunter's chain) with which to measure lengths, as well as poles, and many older legal descriptions of real estate in the United States are given in chains and poles.

== Resolving inconsistencies ==
Some courts have established a list of priorities to resolve inconsistent descriptions of corners. In descending order starting with the most reliable: (1) natural monuments, (2) artificial monuments such as roads and marked or surveyed lines, (3) adjacent tracts or boundaries, (4) courses or directions, (5) distances, and (6) area or quantity.

== Difficulties ==
Once such a survey is in place, the corners may have to depend on tradition and long use to establish the line along the boundaries between them. In some areas where land was deeded before 1593, the lengths given predate the changes to the length of the furlong and mile by Queen Elizabeth I. In other places references to the official borders of towns, counties, and states may have changed. Compass directions always have to be tied to a table of annual deflections because magnetic north is constantly changing. The description might refer to landmarks such as the large oak tree which could disappear; or be confused with a different tree that had grown later. Streams might dry up, meander or change course. Man-made features such as roads, walls, markers or stakes used to mark corners and determine the line of the boundaries between corners may have been moved. As these features move, change and disappear over time, when it comes time to re-establish the corners along the line of these boundaries (for sale, subdivision, or building construction) it can become difficult, even impossible, to determine the original location of the corner. In the metes and bounds system, corners, distance, direction, monuments and bounds are always carried back to the original intent regardless of where they are now. Court cases are sometimes required to settle the matter when it is suspected the corner markers may have been moved.

These kinds of problems caused the United States to largely replace this system except in the east. Beginning with the Land Ordinance of 1785, it began a transition to the Public Land Survey System (PLSS) used in the central and western states. The eastern, or original states, continue to use the metes and bounds surveys of their founders.

== History of use in the United States ==
This system was imported to the original colonies that formed the United States. It is also used in some states that were previously part of one of the Thirteen Colonies, or where land was allocated before 1785. These include West Virginia, Kentucky, Maine, Tennessee and Vermont. Because Texas was an independent republic prior to statehood, its land system is primarily metes and bounds.

Election constituency boundaries continue to be described by the use of metes and bounds, even in jurisdictions where land plats are not otherwise based upon metes and bounds. Such mapping generally uses streets and their intersections to define the boundaries of election districts, wards, precincts, inter alia. E.g.: "From the intersection of Main Street and John Doe Boulevard, thence north to ABC Drive, thence generally east along the median of ABC Drive to 123rd Street, thence..."

== Use in Canada ==
As in the U.S. and in England, metes and bounds were routinely used in Canada to describe cadastral boundaries. For increased clarity, such metes and bounds descriptions often became accompanied by a survey-sketch in deeds. Over time (for instance, in the 1960s and 1970s in Ontario), the survey-sketches became pre-eminent, would themselves be registered on title (for instance as so-called R-plans or reference plans), and the narrative metes and bounds descriptions of the parcel boundary came to be omitted. Nevertheless, those R-plans (or similar survey plans) contain the same information as the metes (distances and bearings, using so-called COGO or co-ordinate geometry) and some bounds (qualifying features per cadastral surveyor standards of practice).

However, metes and bounds continue to be frequently used to officially define the territory of electoral districts, particularly in urban areas where the districts may subdivide municipalities or otherwise not conform to municipal boundaries. For example, the definition for the federal electoral district of Ottawa Centre in the 2012 representation order reads (in part):

Consisting of that part of the City of Ottawa described as follows: commencing at the intersection of the interprovincial boundary between Ontario and Quebec with a line running 45°00'W from the mouth of the Rideau Canal; thence S45°00'E along said line to the mouth of the Rideau Canal; thence generally southeasterly along said canal to the northeasterly production of Frank Street; thence northeasterly along said production to the intersection of Greenfield Avenue with Nicholas Street; thence southeasterly along Nicholas Street to Highway No. 417; thence easterly along said highway to the Rideau River; thence generally southerly along said river to the easterly production of Borden Side Road; thence westerly along said production to Prince of Wales Drive; [...]

The difficulty with permanency of features on the ground does not arise because the electoral districts are redistributed every ten years, allowing districts to be brought into conformity with any features that have changed in the intervening time.

== See also ==
- Beating the bounds
- Boundary (real estate)
- Butts and bounds
- Lot and block survey system
- Surveying
