= Urban township =

Designation of a unit of local government in several countries

An urban township is a unit of local government. While the concept of an urban township exists in multiple countries, the precise definition may vary between jurisdictions.

== United States ==
An urban township (or "urban town" in Wisconsin) is an unincorporated area which has adopted a limited local government. Generally, an urban township is afforded more local authority than that of a township and less than that of a city. Often, urban townships use this authority for greater economic development. Urban townships often allow residents greater say in local matters, as opposed to incorporated cities, where elected representatives make decisions on their behalf. (In Michigan, an urban township is different from a Charter township.) For more information on the specifics in each state, see the respective entries below:

- Urban township (Michigan)
- Urban township (Minnesota)
- Urban township (Ohio)
- Urban town (Wisconsin)

== Taiwan ==
In Taiwan, the urban township (Chinese: 鎮; pinyin: zhèn) is an administrative division of a county. Currently there are 38 urban townships in Taiwan. Those urban townships are:

- Beidou
- Beigang
- Budai
- Caotun
- Chaozhou
- Chenggong
- Dalin
- Donggang
- Dounan
- Erlin
- Fenglin
- Guanshan
- Guanxi
- Hemei
- Hengchun
- Houlong
- Huwei
- Jiji
- Jincheng
- Jinhu
- Jinsha
- Lukang
- Luodong
- Puli
- Su'ao
- Tianzhong
- Tongxiao
- Toucheng
- Tuku
- Xihu
- Xiluo
- Xinpu
- Yuanli
- Yuli
- Zhudong
- Zhuolan
- Zhunan
- Zhushan

== See also ==
- Borough
- District-level town
- Incorporated town
- Village
