= Grazing rights =

Legal right of a livestock owner to allow their animals to feed in a given area

Grazing rights is the right of a user to allow their livestock to feed (graze) in a given area.

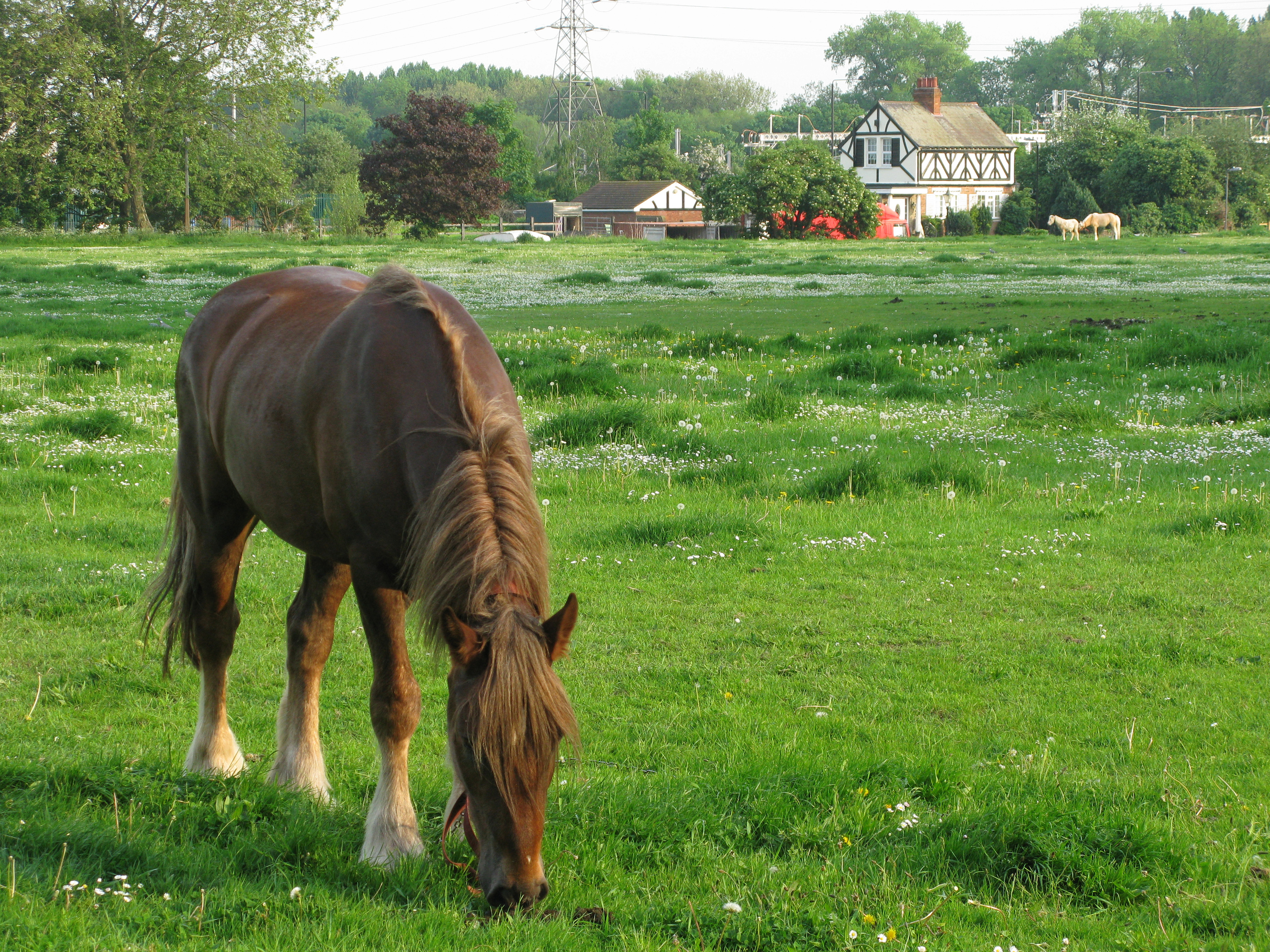
Grazing rights in action: Leyton Marshes in London, where historic grazing (and other) rights are still in place, although not always willingly acceded by the authorities

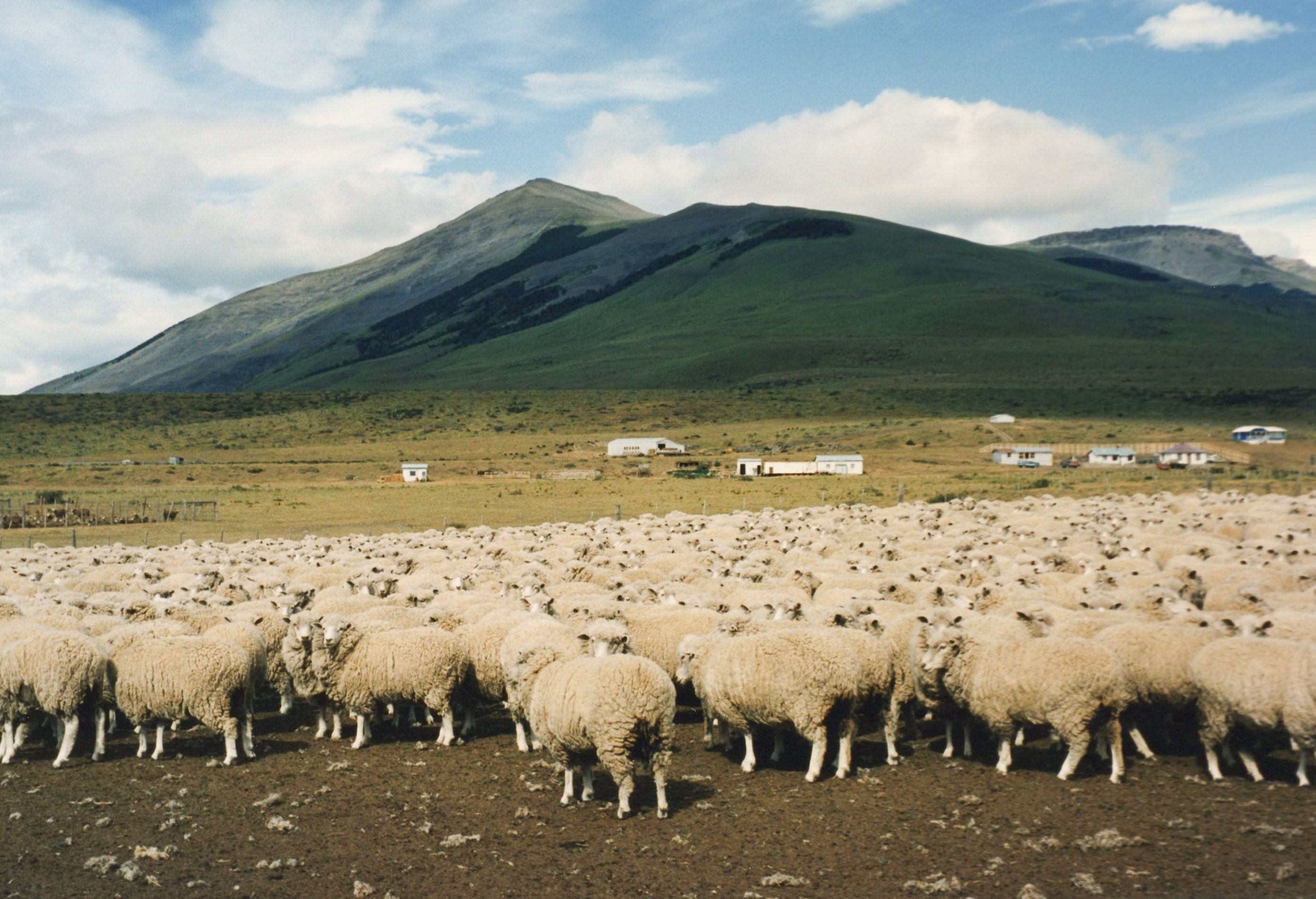
A large sheep farm in Chile.

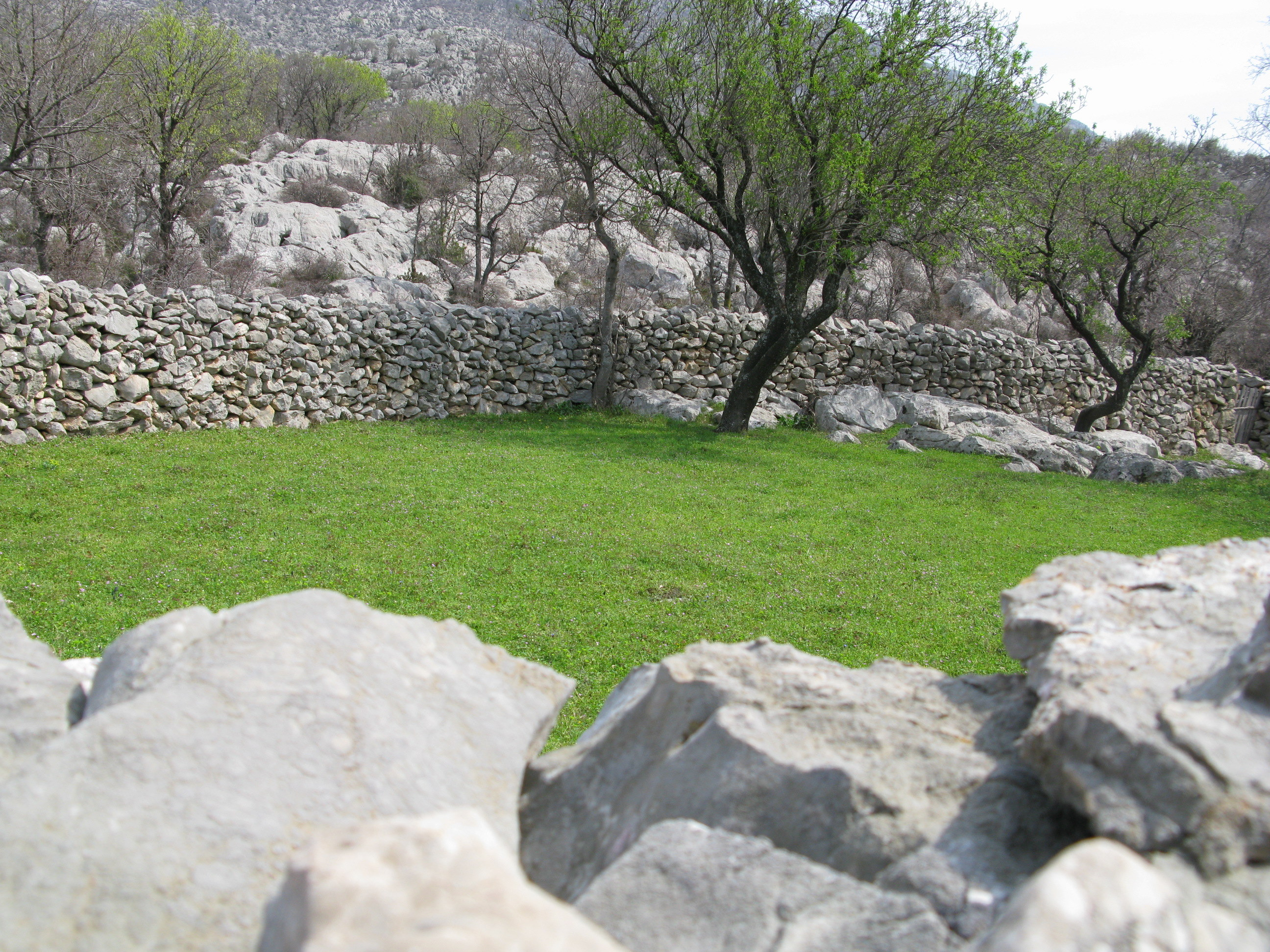
Historically dry stone walls were used for managing and protecting sheep livestock which had been a major food staple in Dalmatia.

== United States ==
Grazing rights have never been codified in United States law, because such common-law rights derive from the English concept of the commons, a piece of land over which people, often neighboring landowners, could exercise one of a number of such traditional rights, including livestock grazing. Prior to the 19th century, the traditional practice of grazing the open range in the United States was rarely disputed because of the sheer amount of unsettled open land. However, as the population of the western United States increased in the mid-to-late 19th century, range wars often erupted over the ranchers' perceived rights to graze their cattle as the western range deteriorated with overuse.

In 1934, the Taylor Grazing Act formally set out the federal government's powers and policy on grazing federal lands in the Western United States by establishing the Division of Grazing and procedures for issuing permits to graze federal lands for a fixed period of time. The Division of Grazing was renamed the US Grazing Service in 1939, and then merged in 1946 with the General Land Office to become the Bureau of Land Management, which along with the United States Forest Service oversees public lands grazing in 16 western states today. However, grazing was never established as a legal right in the U.S., and the Taylor Grazing Act authorized only the permitted use of lands designated as available for livestock grazing while specifying that grazing permits "convey no right, title, or interest" to such lands. Although the regulations stipulated by the Taylor Grazing Act apply only to grazing on Bureau of Land Management lands, the Chief of the Forest Service is authorized to permit or suspend grazing on Forest Service administered property, and many Forest Service grazing regulations resemble those of the Taylor Grazing Act.

== Dalmatia ==
In Dalmatia, a historical region of Croatia, judgments about grazing rights are a fundamental part of the jurisprudence. The oldest court verdict in Dalmatia in a court case about grazing rights dates from the 14th century. It is a usufruct of property, which belongs to someone else, or it is a use of a property. Use of someone else's property requires a contract (written or not) about the usufruct. The court may declare parts of the contract as unlawful.

If there is no contract, common law (also called case law) comes to apply. The decisions on who was allowed to judge on grazing rights cases were different in the Middle Ages, which reasoned in tradition and in the natural resources in each area, such as water, meadows, lawns and others. Some peasants wrote their own statute, like Poljica republic in 1440. Also, some dukes wrote together with some peasants their own statute, like Law codex of Vinodol from 1288.

== See also ==
- Enclosure
- Leyton Marshes
- Tragedy of the commons
- Village green
- Water rights
