= Leyton Marsh =

Open space in Leyton, London

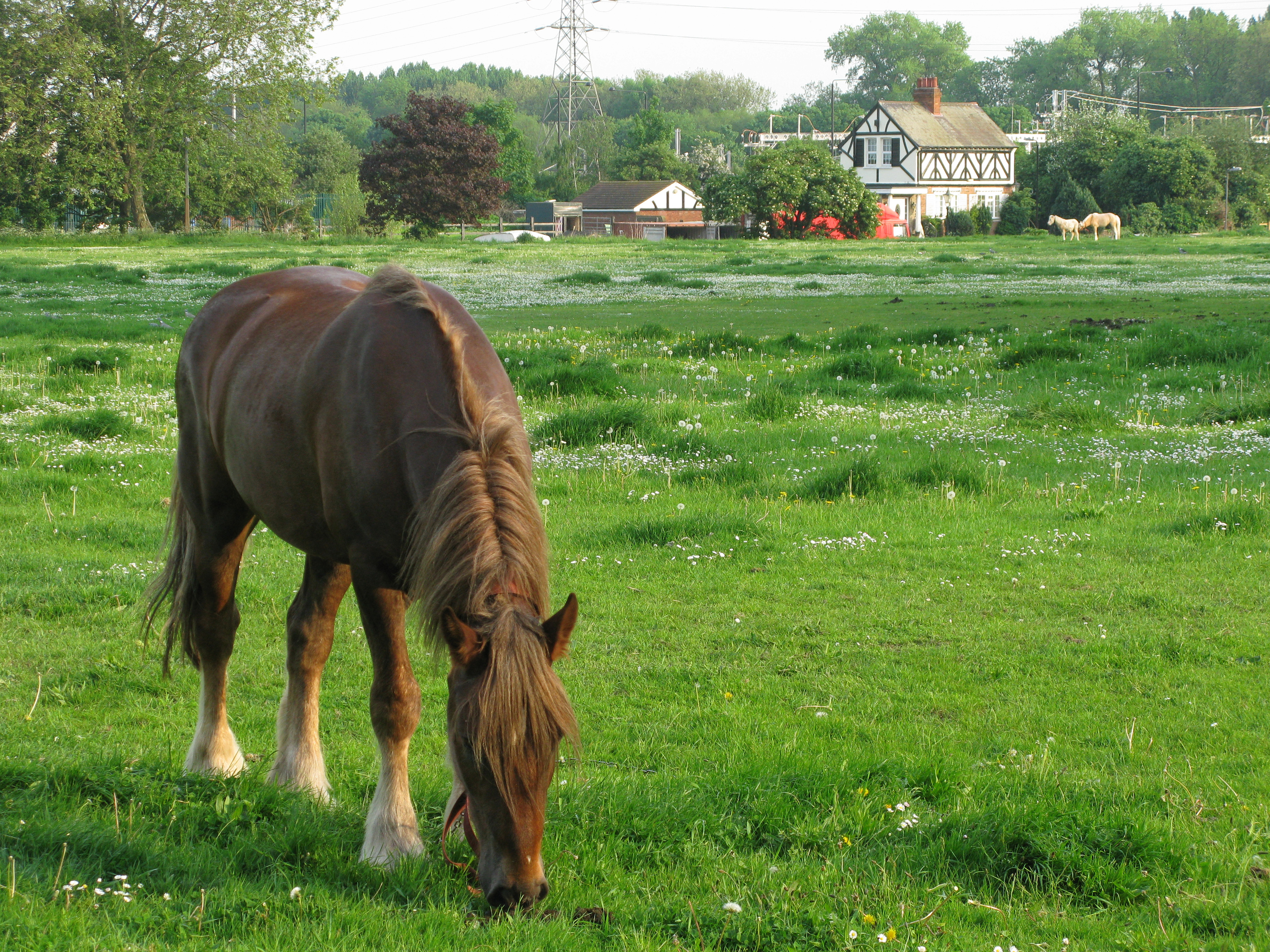
- Horse grazing in open land near Marsh Lane

- Location within Greater London
- Location: London
- Coordinates: 51°34′1.48″N 0°2′43.61″W

Leyton Marsh is an open space in the Lower Lea Valley, located in Leyton in the London Borough of Waltham Forest.

== Geography ==
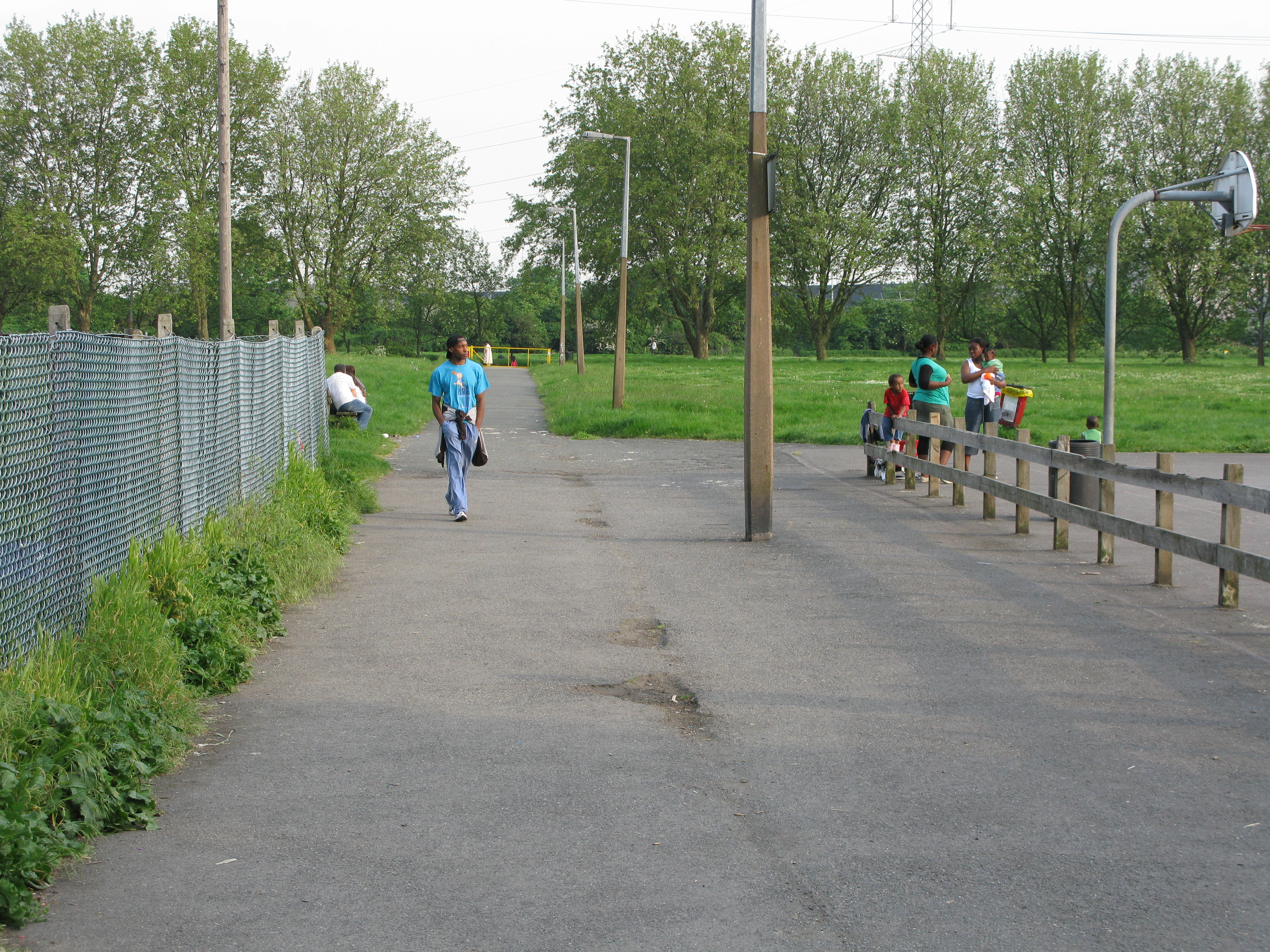
Playgrounds near the Seymour Road entrance

The marsh is bordered by the Walthamstow Marshes to the north, and by Coppermill Fields, the Lee Navigation and the River Lee Flood Relief Channel. Much of the original area has been taken over for other uses. The remaining open land is split into two distinct areas:

- Leyton Marsh, to the north of Lea Bridge Road, adjoining the Walthamstow Marsh Nature Reserve. The part of the marsh north east of the Lea Bridge Road contains a large field (Porter's Field Meadow), which is used for a variety of events, including an annual schools countryside teaching event. The area is also used by local people for sporting events, and is part of various cycling and running routes that take in Leyton Marsh as well as other local parks and open spaces.
- The Marsh Lane area of Seymour Road Playing Field and Marsh Lane Playing Field, north and south of Marsh Lane respectively. Since August 2012 its official name has been Leyton Jubilee Park. This area is now cut off from the rest of the marsh, connected only by a long pedestrian bridge over the railway. Access from Lea Bridge Road is at the end of Seymour Road. The Dagenham Brook forms the eastern extent of the historical Leyton Marshes.

Other areas which were historically part of Leyton Marshes are now put to other uses:

- Lee Valley Ice Centre.

There are proposals to redevelop the Ice Centre, improving facilities but at the expense of public open space.

- Lea Valley Riding Centre
- WaterWorks Nature Reserve

Lammas Lane, despite historic associations, is buried in an industrial estate alongside the railway.

== History ==
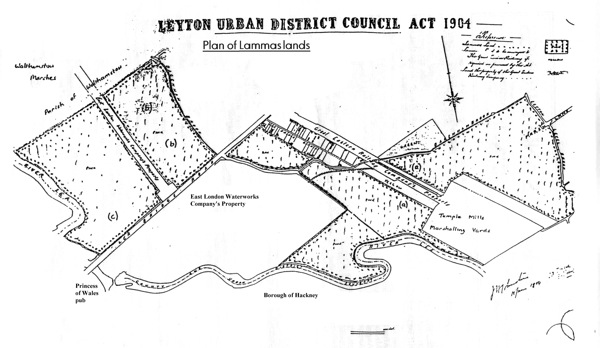
Plan of Lammas lands, Leyton Urban District Council Act 1904

Leyton Marsh was originally more extensive open marsh, historically drained by means of open drainage ditches. The marsh is former Lammas Land: the land was divided into strips, which were cultivated to grow hay for winter feed. Parishioners had ancient rights to graze cattle and horses between 1 August (after the hay harvest) and 25 March.

In the 19th century the marsh was polluted by sewage from the extensive new residential developments in Walthamstow and Leyton.

By the 19th century the character of the marsh changed. Many acres were bought and built on by railway, water and gas companies. In the early 1890s the East London Waterworks Company erected fences, which angered local people. On Lammas Day in 1892, a large demonstration took place on the marsh and the fences were taken down. The locals set up the Leyton Lammas Lands Defence Committee and successfully challenged the water company in court. This led to the Leyton Urban District Council Act 1904, which provided that the marsh would be kept as an open space, in return for local people giving up Lammas rights. The fields at Marsh Lane did not come under this agreement and remain as Lammas land.

During World War II, a V-2 rocket landed and exploded on the marsh; the crater is still visible seven decades later (Despite the account given in the reference, the V2 concerned fell a little to the north on the adjacent Walthamstow Marsh: see Bomb Crater Pond (Walthamstow)). After the war, the marsh was used to dump rubble from The Blitz.

In 1971, the Lee Valley Regional Park Authority acquired much of the land by compulsory purchase. It acquired the Essex Filter Beds in 1986 (now the WaterWorks Nature Reserve) and the Middlesex Filter Beds in 1988 (now the Middlesex Filter Beds Nature Reserve). Both of these are on the south side of Lea Bridge Road and were formerly part of the marsh.

== Recent history and current use ==
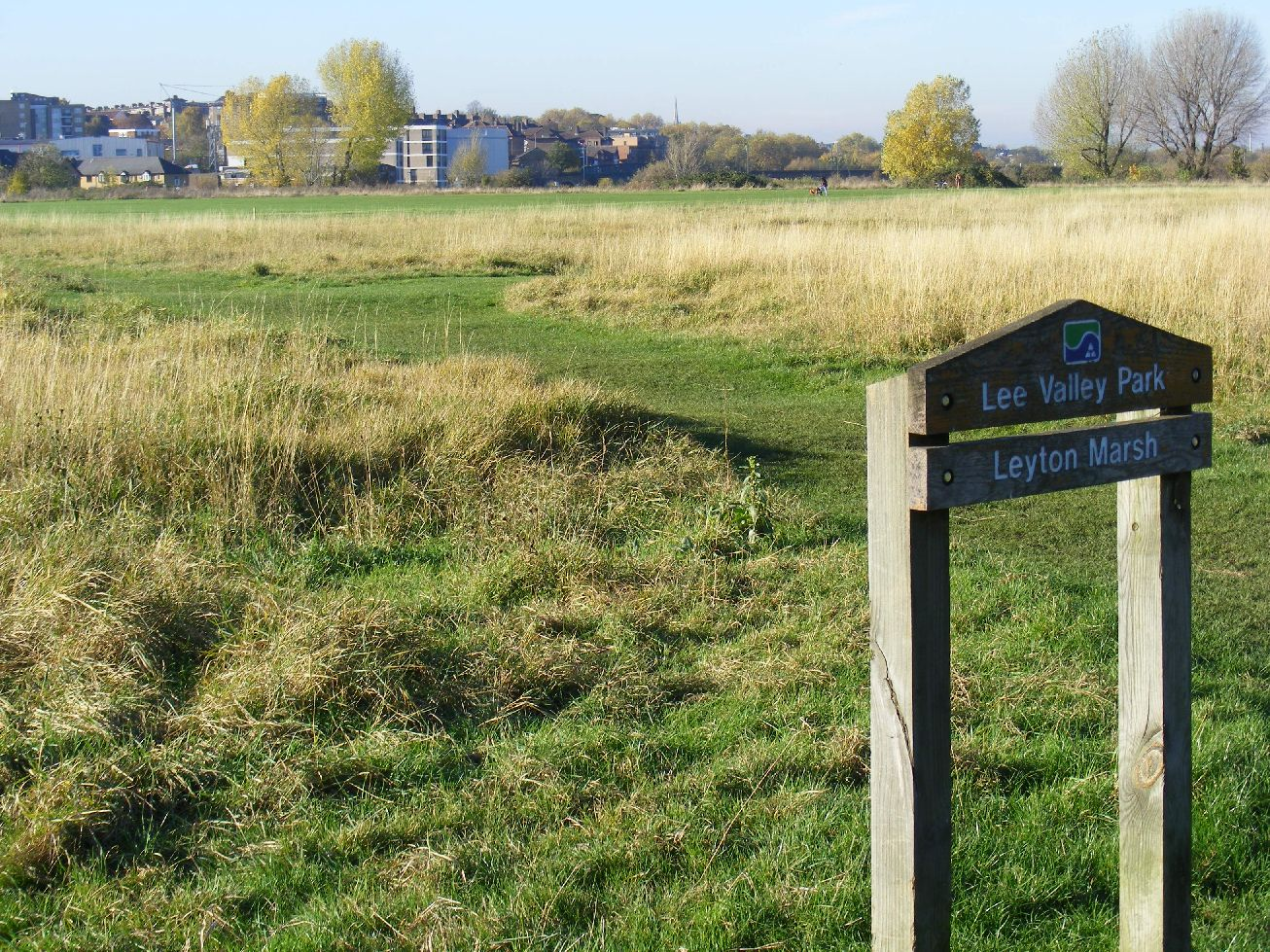
Part of Leyton Marsh, restored after use for the 2012 Olympics

The New Lammas Lands Defence Committee, a revival of the earlier organisation, is currently active in promoting, and on occasion defending, the public use of the marsh. Events include organised walks, with an annual highlight on 13 March: beating the bounds, an ancient ritual defining the boundaries of the land where grazing rights were enjoyed.

Parts of Leyton Marshes were used for the 2012 London Olympic and Paralympic Games, despite some local opposition. A temporary basketball training venue was built on Porter's Field Meadow for the games, which was opposed by members of Save Lea Marshes. The venue was dismantled after the Paralympic Games, the Olympic Delivery Authority being required to return the open space to its original state. In addition, on the request of the local user group, the Lee Valley Regional Park Authority committed to spending £65,000 on improving Leyton Marsh, including pathways and seating, as well as introducing habitats to attract existing and new species of wildlife into the area.
