= Butts and bounds =

On legal deeds and their content

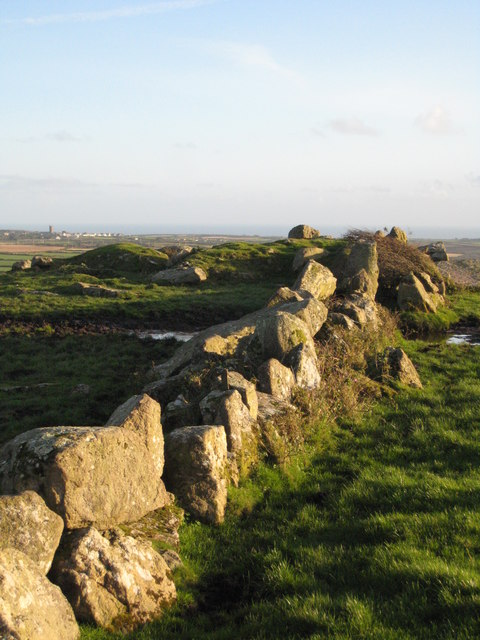
Field boundary in the United Kingdom

Butts and bounds, shortened form for "abuttals and boundaries" of a property, are the boundary lines delineated between plots of land, usually those which define the end of an estate, as used in legal deeds, titles, etc. These are usually descriptive features in the property, such as trees, outcroppings of stone, or riverine brooks, etc., and are signified in the legal deed for purposes of identification.

== Historical uses ==
The practice of signifying butts and bounds in the sale of real estate and in legal deeds and contracts is an ancient practice, having attestation in the Hebrew Bible. In the episode of Abraham who purchased the field of Ephron in Genesis 23:17, and where it describes the cave and the trees in the outermost bounds of the property, the Sages of Israel learnt thereby that he that sells his field must write in the deed its landmarks and boundaries.

According to rabbinic tradition, Joshua, when dividing the Land of Canaan among the twelve tribes of Israel, planted Sea squill (Hebrew: חצוב) to mark off the butts and bounds of tribal inheritance. The practice was still prevalent along the coast of the Syrian-Egyptian desert as late as the 20th-century.

In Jewish laws of agronomy, the prohibition of marking off butts and bounds beginning on the first day of the lunar month Tishri during the Seventh-year (until the end of that year) is expressly stated in the compendium of Jewish oral law known as the Mishnah (Shevi'it 2:2):

Until the New Year they may mark the butts and bounds of property (Hebrew: מיבלין), strip off leaves, cover up [exposed] roots or fumigate plants.

=== Legal deeds of conveyance ===
The civil laws with respect to standard formularies used in drafting documents and legal deeds differ from country to country. For example, in some societies the custom requires that, where there are no distinct physical features in the said property, it is sufficient to mention the name(s) of the property owner(s) of the adjacent fields. As early as anno 500 CE it was litigated:

If the field is bounded by fields of Reuben on the east and west and by fields of Simeon on the north and south, he must write, 'the field is bounded by fields of Reuben on two sides, and by fields of Simeon on two sides.' [And not simply, 'It lies between the fields of Reuben and Simeon,' which leaves room for ambiguity.]

In older legal deeds, the phrase "butted and bounded by..." often precedes the actual description of the ends of the land in question. In modern conveyances of real estate, the legal term is often defined as Parcels clause.

=== United States ===
With the development of modern surveying techniques in Europe and the proposals put forward before the US Congress under the Land Ordinance of 1785, a more efficient way was devised in the United States for the layout, sale and disposal of private and public lands, known as the Public Land Survey System. This new system formed the basis for dividing all territory, and where it called-out unto surveyors in their respective places to take an account of all lands, and to divide the same territory into Townships of six miles square, by lines running due north and south, and others crossing these at right angles. The plats of townships respectively were to be marked by subdivisions consisting each of lots of one mile square, or 640 acres, and numbered from 1 to 36. These numbered subdivisions were known as Sections.

Sections could also be divided into four equal quarters (fractions of a section), known simply as NW (north-west), NE (north-east), SW (south-west) and SE (south-east), while each quarter could be subdivided into another four quarters, such that the north-east quarter when divided into four more quarters, would have the designation of either SENE (south-east of north-east quarter), or SWNE (south-west of north-east quarter), or NWNE (north-west of north-east quarter), or NENE (north-east of north-east quarter). In this manner, all sections were duly divided.

Thus, by this means, land holders who either bought land or who were granted land due to their military service, were able to register their holdings in their names, in their respective counties, with the date of purchase or issuance of a military warrant, and the precise location of the property: e.g. lands of Section 14, in Township 11S (eleven South), of Range 14W (fourteen West) ascribed to the person. Township numbers were always followed by a principal meridian directional sign (either N or S, for north and south), while the range number was always followed by a base line directional sign (either E or W, for east and west).

=== Australia ===
In Australian common law, which shares a common law heritage with the United Kingdom, Canada and the United-States, "A description by abuttals will, as a rule, override measurements expressed in figures if conflict exists between description and measurement". The same rule applies in 2nd-century Judaic law, except where the seller had noted in the transaction that he was selling to the buyer a parcel of land defined by measurement, and which same measurement he (the seller) expressly stated as extending as far as its physical butts and bounds. Had the buyer discovered, when he came to take an account of his field, that the butts and bounds did not extend so far, but were one-sixth (1/6) less than the designated measurement avouched by the seller, the sale does not hold-up as good, seeing that the conditions were fraudulent, in which case, the seller is required to reimburse to its buyer the difference paid (diminishing one-sixth of the cost), or else give to him more land. When both measurement and descriptive features are used, anything less than a deviancy of 1/6 is still in the realm of accuracy.

== Historical example ==
The following deed of sale from the US shows the parameters of a plot of land, bounded by trees and a river:

Deed of sale conveying a tract of land. Surry County, North Carolina, dated 1784

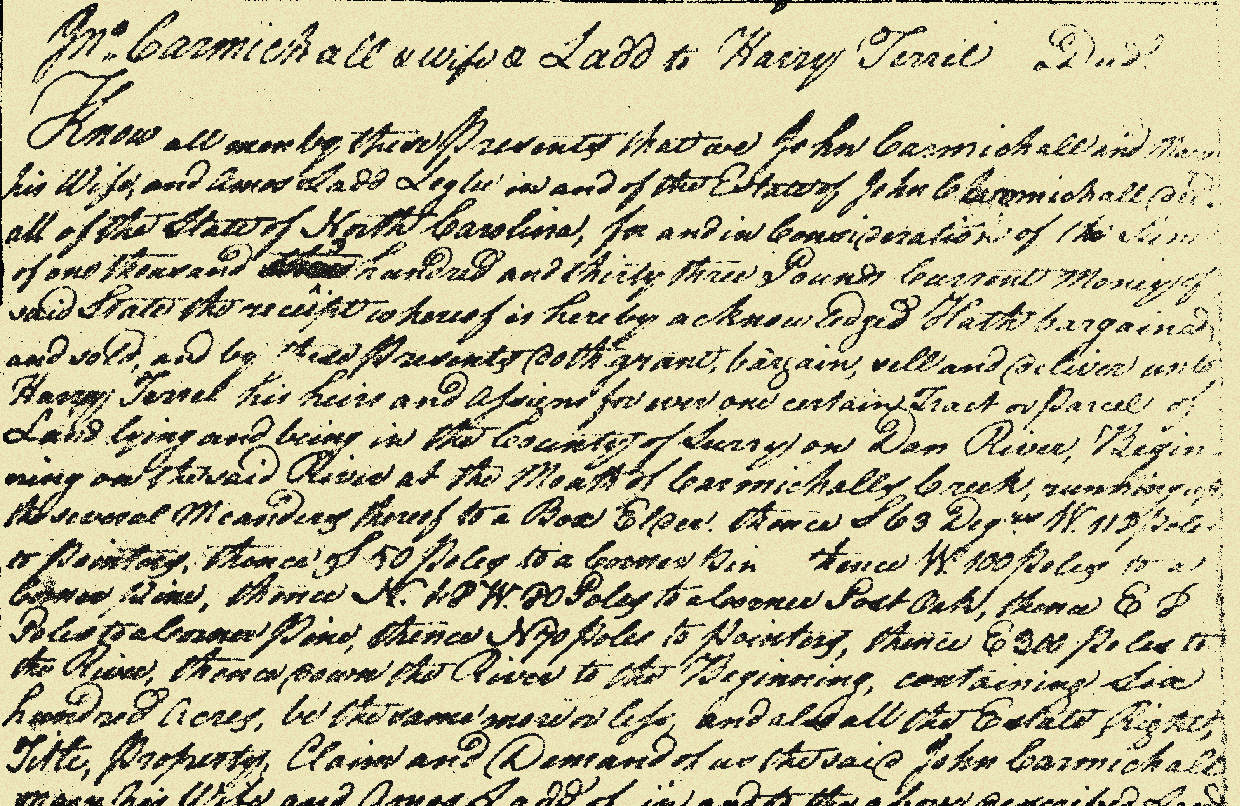
Legal deed of property transaction, dated 1784

Butts and bounds described in legal deed of 1784 (USA). Courtesy of Register of Deeds, Surry County, North Carolina (Book C, page 110):

“Know all men by these presents that we John Carmichall and Mary his wife and Amos Ladd Leslee [...] all of the State of North Carolina, for and in consideration of the sum of one-thousand three-hundred and thirty-three Pounds current money of said State, the receipt whereof is hereby acknowledged, Hath bargained and sold, and by these presents doth grant, bargain, sell and deliver unto Harry Terrel his heirs and assign forever one certain Tract or Parcel of Land lying and being in the County of Surry on Dan River, Beginning on the said River at the Mouth of Carmichall's Creek, running up the several Meanders thereof to a Box Elder, thence S [= south] 63 Degrees, W [= west] 118 poles to Pointers, thence S. [= south] 50 Poles to a Corner Pin[e]; thence W. [= west] 100 poles to a corner pine; thence N. [= north] 48; W. [= west] 80 Poles to a corner Post Oak; thence E. [= east] 8 Poles to a Corner Pine; thence N. [= north] 70 Poles to pointers; thence E. [= east] 300 poles to the River; thence down the River to the Beginning, containing Six-hundred acres, be the same more or less [...], etc.”

== See also ==
- Beating of the bounds
- Boundary (real estate)
- Boundary marker
- Deed
- Land lot
- Metes and bounds
- Title (property)
