= Boundary (real estate) =

Conceptual line dividing land into units of ownership

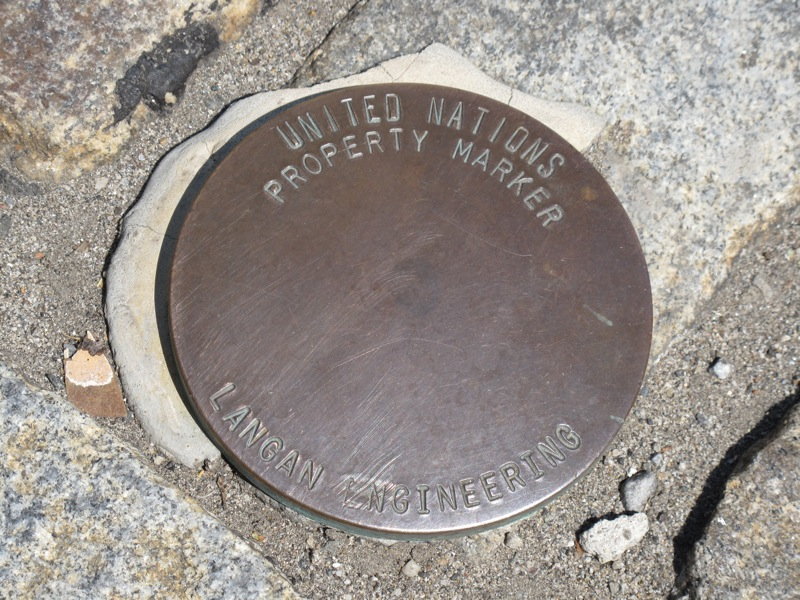
A property marker outside the United Nations building in New York City.

A unit of real estate or immovable property is limited by a legal boundary (sometimes also referred to as a property line, lot line or bounds). The boundary (in Latin: limes) may appear as a discontinuation in the terrain: a ditch, a bank, a hedge, a wall, or similar, but essentially, a legal boundary is a conceptual entity, a social construct, adjunct to the likewise abstract entity of property rights.

A cadastral map displays how boundaries subdivide land into units of ownership. However, the relations between society, owner, and land in any culture or jurisdiction are conceived of in terms more complex than a tessellation. Therefore, the society concerned has to specify the rules and means by which the boundary concept is materialized and located on the ground.

A 'Western' version of the boundary determination might be a legally specified procedure, performed by a chartered surveyor, supported by statements from neighbors and pertinent documents, and resulting in official recording in the cadastre as well as boundary markings in the field. Alternatively, indigenous people represent boundaries through ephemeral performances, such as song and dance, and, when in more permanent form, e.g. paintings or carvings, in an artistic or metaphorical manner.

== Identifying boundaries ==
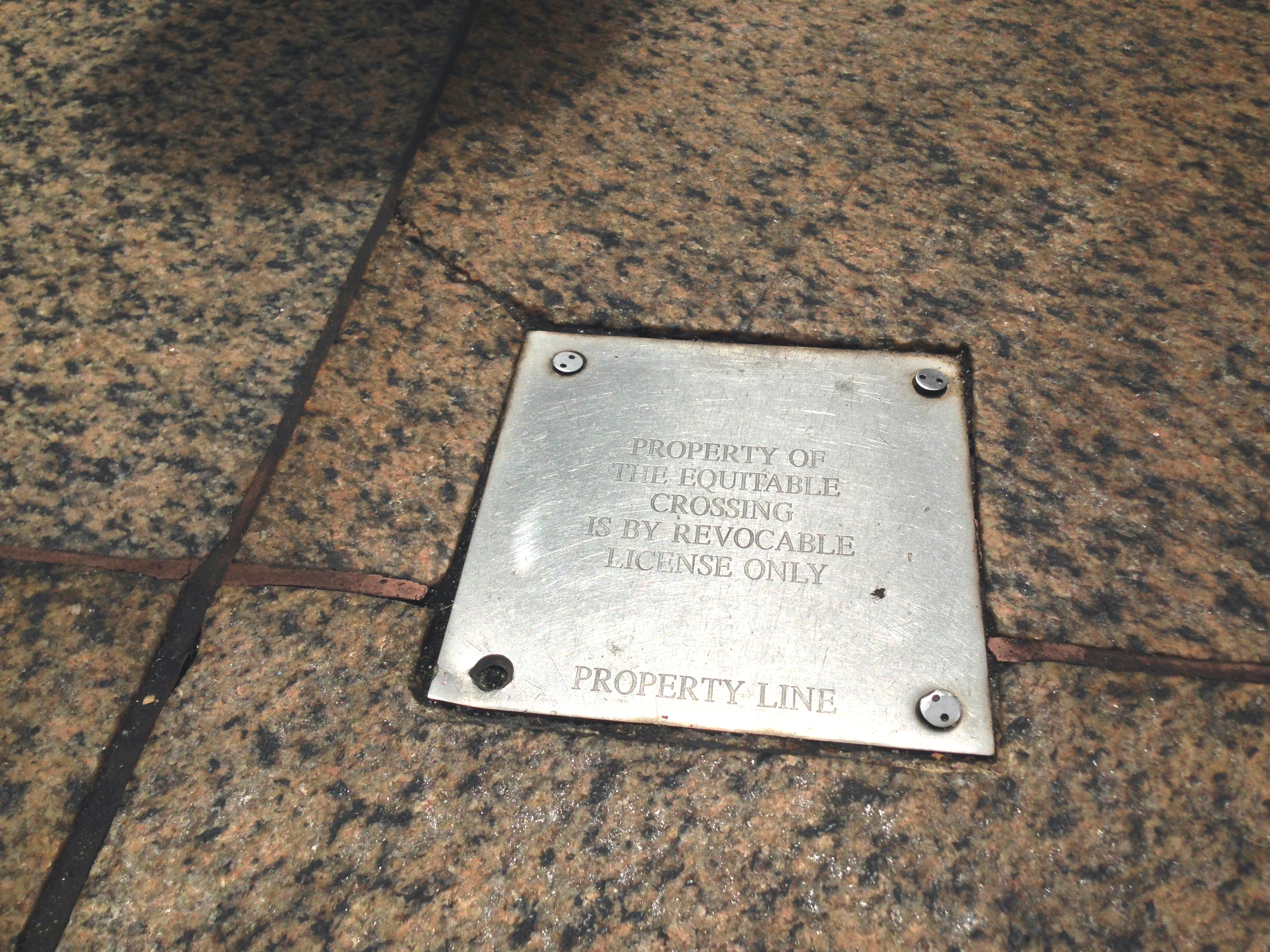
A private property line plaque separating the private property and the public right of way on a sidewalk in New York City. It declares that the public may utilize the space inside the private property by a revocable license, to prevent it from becoming a prescriptive easement.

Legal boundaries are usually established by a professional surveyor using a transit and or modern Global Positioning System (GPS) technology. The coordinates of the property line are often described on a drawing called a "plot plan" or "plat" by indicating the length of the boundary along a specific compass bearing in relation to a verifiable "point of beginning". The metes and bounds method is also used to provide a legal description of a property.

On maps, the line may be marked with U+214A ⅊ PROPERTY LINE.

The ⅊ symbol may also be used in architectural drawings and CAD design to show plates.

== Related concepts ==
- Land parcel
- Boundary dispute
- Butts and bounds
- Digital Cadastral DataBase
- National territories and borders
- Redistribution, land consolidation
- Surveying, Coordinate system
- Territory (administrative division)
- Title (property)
- Commons
