= Leyton Jubilee Park =

Park in Leyton, London

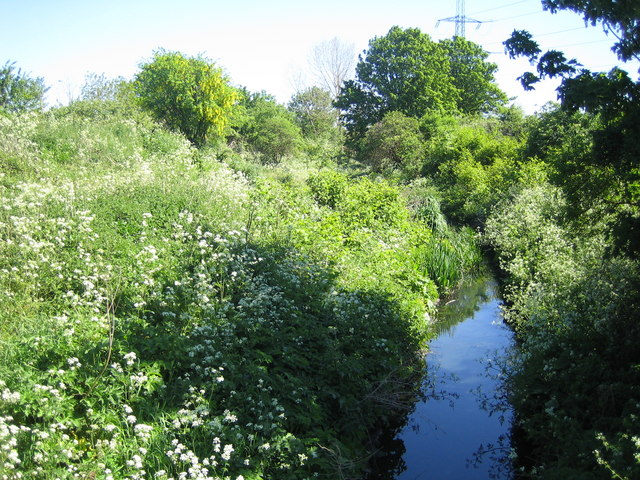
- Dagenham Brook, the eastern boundary of Leyton Jubilee Park

- Location within Greater London
- Type: Public Park
- Location: Leyton, London
- Coordinates: 51.563°N 0.024°W
- Area: 12 hectares (0.12 km^{2})
- Opened: 2012
- Awards: Green Flag Award
- Public transit: Leyton tube station and Leyton Midland Road railway station

Leyton Jubilee Park is a park in Leyton, London, and the largest park managed by Waltham Forest Borough Council. It was formed out of the merger of two green spaces, Ive Farm and Marsh Lane Playing Fields in August 2012.

The park's ecology includes scrub woodland, meadow, wildflowers and mature trees including poplars and London planes. Dagenham Brook is a river running along the eastern boundary of the park, which is populated by such birds as kingfishers and little egrets.

The park's features include picnic, recreation and seating areas, playgrounds, an outdoor gym and a community cafe.
