= Urban town =

Proposed classification for towns in Wisconsin

An urban town is a proposed classification for towns in the state of Wisconsin, similar to the urban townships of Minnesota and Ohio. The concept, originally proposed in 2001, as AB501, limited the classification to towns with over 7,500 people. The proposal has gained support from such organizations as the Wisconsin Towns Association. The impetus that originally spawned the concept of urban towns was an effort to stem annexation of urbanized areas in unincorporated area by cities and villages across county lines. Obtaining "urban town" status effectively freezes the town's boundaries. While urban towns would have substantially greater zoning and regulatory rights than "rural towns", the status would not confer "incorporated" status on the municipality, freeing them from several responsibilities incumbent upon incorporated municipal governments, thus distinguishing them from the incorporated towns of Illinois.

In the time since the idea was originally proposed, many of the towns that would have been affected have since incorporated, but 2004 population estimates indicate that a number of towns that would have been ineligible in 2001, now are. As of March 2007, the eligible include:

- Delafield (town), Wisconsin (Waukesha County)
- Genesee, Wisconsin (Waukesha County)
- Grand Chute, Wisconsin (Outagamie County)
- Grand Rapids, Wisconsin (Wood County)
- Greenville, Wisconsin (Outagamie County)
- Harrison, Calumet County, Wisconsin
- Lisbon, Waukesha County, Wisconsin
- Menasha (town), Wisconsin (Winnebago County)
- Merton (town), Wisconsin (Waukesha County)
- Norway, Wisconsin (Racine County)
- Oconomowoc (town), Wisconsin (Waukesha County)
- Rib Mountain, Wisconsin (Marathon County)
- Salem, Kenosha County, Wisconsin
- Somers, Wisconsin (Kenosha County)
- Springfield, Dane County, Wisconsin
- Waukesha (town), Wisconsin (Waukesha County)

If current trends continue, over a dozen other towns will fit the population requirements by the 2010 census.

== Developments ==
Since the initial legislative proposals, several of the towns have pursued municipal incorporation as villages to secure boundary protections and full urban powers.
