= Digital Cadastral DataBase =

An example of a DCDB file showing properties, road easements and a watercourse

Digital Cadastral DataBase (DCDB) is a computerised map or 'spatial' location showing property boundaries normally in relation to adjoining and other close properties or parcels of land. Commonly used as a basic layer of data used in map based computer programs that gives an outline of the legal boundaries of a property. By using lines to represent an area, features such as rivers and roads can be shown in relation to the property location.

== See also ==
- Cartography
