= Incorporated town =

Town that is a municipal corporation

An incorporated town is a town that is a municipal corporation.

== Canada ==
Incorporated towns are a form of local government in Canada, which is a responsibility of provincial rather than federal government.

== United States ==
An incorporated town or city in the United States is a municipality that is incorporated under state law. An incorporated town will have elected officials, as differentiated from an unincorporated community, which exists only by tradition and does not have elected officials at the town level. In some states, civil townships may sometimes be called towns, but are generally not incorporated municipalities, but are administrative subdivisions and derive their authority from statute rather than from a charter. In New York and Wisconsin, "towns" are more similar in concept to townships in other states than to incorporated towns in most states. In some other states, the term "town" is not used for municipalities. There are also different types of town/city governments (incorporated or chartered) that affect the organization administrative powers such as council-manager government that is the most popular form, townships, villages, town meeting, etc.

=== California ===
Under California's Government Code Sections 34500–34504, the terms "city" and "town" are explicitly interchangeable, i.e. there is no legal distinction between an incorporated city and an incorporated town. California has 22 incorporated municipalities that are styled "Town of (Name)" instead of "City of (Name)".

=== Illinois ===
In Illinois, an incorporated town is one of three types of incorporated municipalities. Incorporated towns were incorporated by special acts of the Illinois General Assembly prior to the creation of the Illinois Municipal Code. Illinois's standard law on municipalities came into effect on July 1, 1872, and does not provide for the incorporation of municipal towns. Since the Municipal Code provides a standard way for citizens to incorporate a new city or village, but not a town, incorporated towns are far less common than city and village municipalities in Illinois.

Although civil townships and incorporated towns are sometimes both called towns, they are completely separate types of government in Illinois: Unlike incorporated towns, townships are subdivisions of a county and are not incorporated municipalities.

The oldest existing municipal town in Illinois is Astoria in Fulton County, incorporated on January 24, 1839; the newest existing town is La Prairie in Adams County, incorporated on April 15, 1869.

There are 19 incorporated towns in Illinois, none of which are county seats

=== Maryland ===
Municipalities in Maryland can be cities, towns, or villages.

=== New England ===
In all six New England states (Connecticut, Rhode Island, Massachusetts, Vermont, New Hampshire, and Maine), towns are the main units of local government. Towns cover most or all land area in all six states, including rural areas. New England towns are notable for their town meeting form of government.

== See also ==
- Urban township
