= Urban township (Michigan) =

An urban township was a designation of a unit of local government in the U.S. state of Michigan as prescribed by section 2 of Public Act 281 of 1986, being section 125.2152 of the Michigan Compiled Laws. The act was repealed in 2018 and took effect January 1, 2019. The designation allowed a general law township or charter township to be considered a municipality under the auspices of the act, and create what is known as a "local development finance authority," in the same way a city or village is entitled. This authority was created in order to, according to the long title of the act, "encourage local development to prevent conditions of unemployment and promote economic growth." Powers that were entitled to such authorities included the issuance of municipal bonds and tax increment financing.

There were five different methods in which a township could be designated an urban township by the state. Common requirements between all methods were a population requirement, which usually mandated that there be 20,000 residents in a township—though that number could be as low as 10,000—and in one case, the population requirement was not of the township, but the county; the population of said county must have been over 1,000,000. This, however, only applied to two counties in 2003 (Wayne and Oakland).
