= Dagenham Brook =

Minor tributary of the River Lea in east London

Coordinates: 51.5617°N 0.02174°W

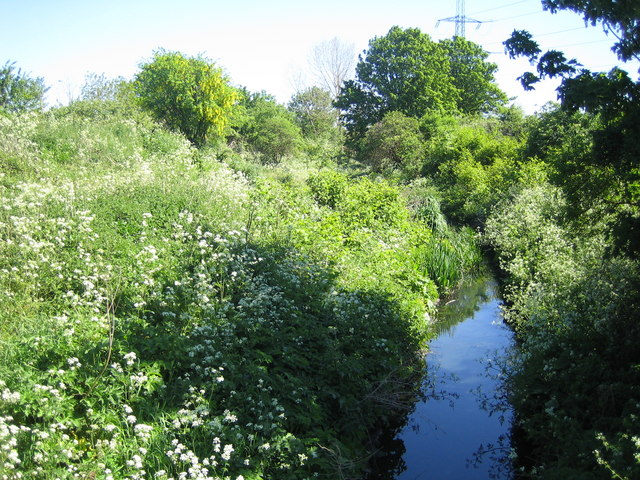
Dagenham Brook at Leyton

Dagenham Brook is a minor tributary of the River Lea located in the London Borough of Waltham Forest, and the traditional eastern limit of Leyton Marshes.

== Course ==
Course of the Dagenham Brook

The brook emerges from the old route of the River Lea at the northeast corner of Lockwood Reservoir and flows south, running alongside the members of the Lee Valley Reservoir Chain until it crosses the Lea Valley lines railway, just to the west of St. James Street railway station in Walthamstow. For this section of its route it forms a part of the Lee Flood Relief Channel, constructed between 1947 and 1976. The flood channel turns west on the south side of the railway and the brook's original course splits off, continuing southeast under Lea Bridge Road until going underground at the site of the former Leyton Sewage Works. (Note: On the east side of the railway depot at Temple Mills and now a commercial solid waste disposal site.) It briefly returns to the surface for a short stretch by Ruckholt Road, at which point it vanishes underground to eventually join the Waterworks River. In the 19th century the brook also, at that point, joined a network of artificial channels that ran through the marshy Temple Mills area.

== Ecology ==
The brook has been designated a site of Local Nature Conservation Importance. Different species of birds that can be spotted along it include the kingfisher. Mammals including foxes and rabbits have also been recorded.
