= Albion, Trempealeau County, Wisconsin =

Albion, Wisconsin
- Town
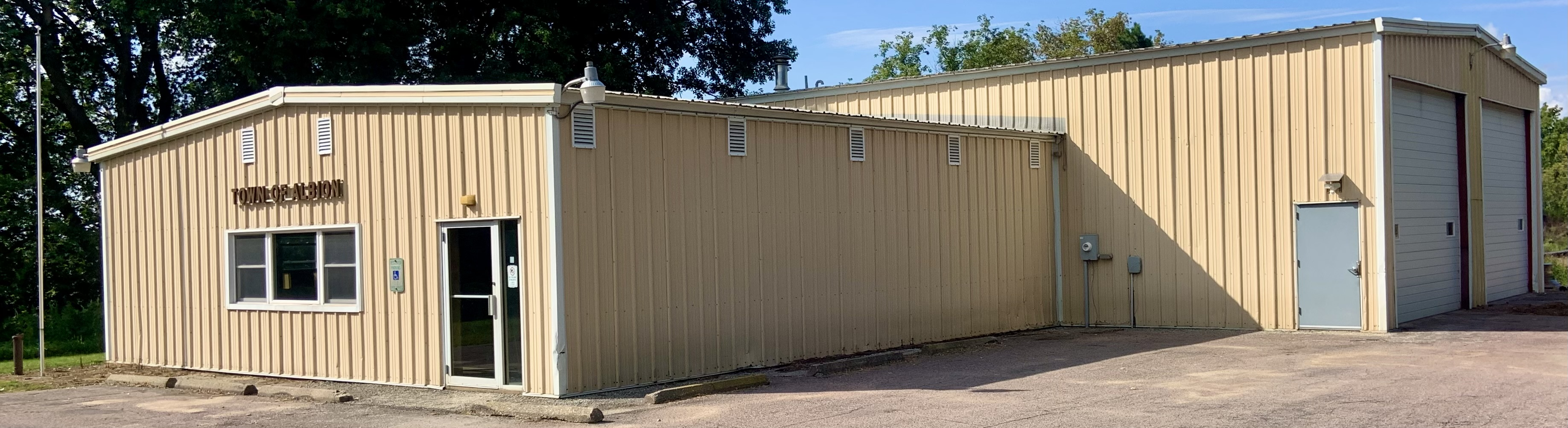
- Town hall

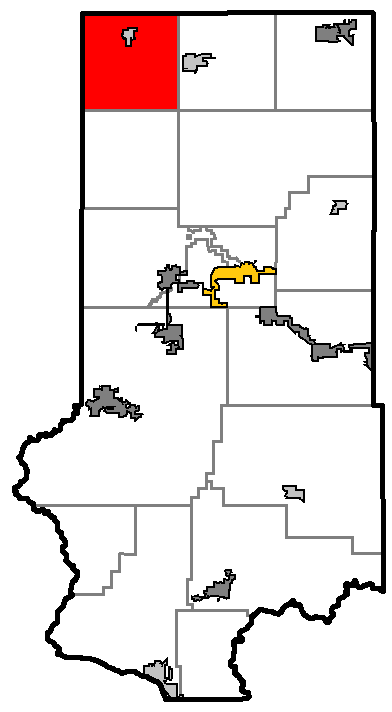
- Location of Albion, Trempealeau County, Wisconsin

- Location of Trempealeau County, Wisconsin
- Coordinates: 44°32′59″N 91°27′38″W
- Country: United States
- State: Wisconsin
- County: Trempealeau

Area
  - Total: 35.3 sq mi (91.5 km^{2})
  - Land: 35.3 sq mi (91.5 km^{2})
  - Water: 0 sq mi (0.0 km^{2})
- Elevation: 896 ft (273 m)

Population (2020)
  - Total: 694
  - Density: 17/sq mi (6.5/km^{2})
- Time zone: UTC-6 (Central (CST))
  - Summer (DST): UTC-5 (CDT)
- FIPS code: 55-00925
- GNIS feature ID: 1582670

Albion (/ˈælbiɒn/ AL-bee-on) is a town in Trempealeau County, Wisconsin, United States. The population was 694 at the 2020 census.

== Geography ==
According to the United States Census Bureau, the town has a total area of 35.3 square miles (91.5 km^{2}), all land.

== Demographics ==
As of the census of 2000, there were 595 people, 215 households, and 187 families residing in the town. The population density was 16.8 people per square mile (6.5/km^{2}). There were 227 housing units at an average density of 6.4 per square mile (2.5/km^{2}). The racial makeup of the town was 98.15% White, 0.50% African American, 0.34% Native American, 0.34% Asian, 0.17% from other races, and 0.50% from two or more races. Hispanic or Latino of any race were 1.01% of the population.

There were 215 households, out of which 41.4% had children under the age of 18 living with them, 74.0% were married couples living together, 6.5% had a female householder with no husband present, and 13.0% were non-families. 11.2% of all households were made up of individuals, and 3.7% had someone living alone who was 65 years of age or older. The average household size was 2.77 and the average family size was 2.94.

In the town, the population was spread out, with 28.2% under the age of 18, 5.4% from 18 to 24, 28.9% from 25 to 44, 26.1% from 45 to 64, and 11.4% who were 65 years of age or older. The median age was 38 years. For every 100 females, there were 100.3 males. For every 100 females age 18 and over, there were 103.3 males.

The median income for a household in the town was $42,431, and the median income for a family was $41,875. Males had a median income of $26,797 versus $22,500 for females. The per capita income for the town was $18,452. About 4.3% of families and 5.6% of the population were below the poverty line, including 6.2% of those under age 18 and none of those age 65 or over.
