= Point of beginning =

Surveyor's mark at the start of a wide-scale survey

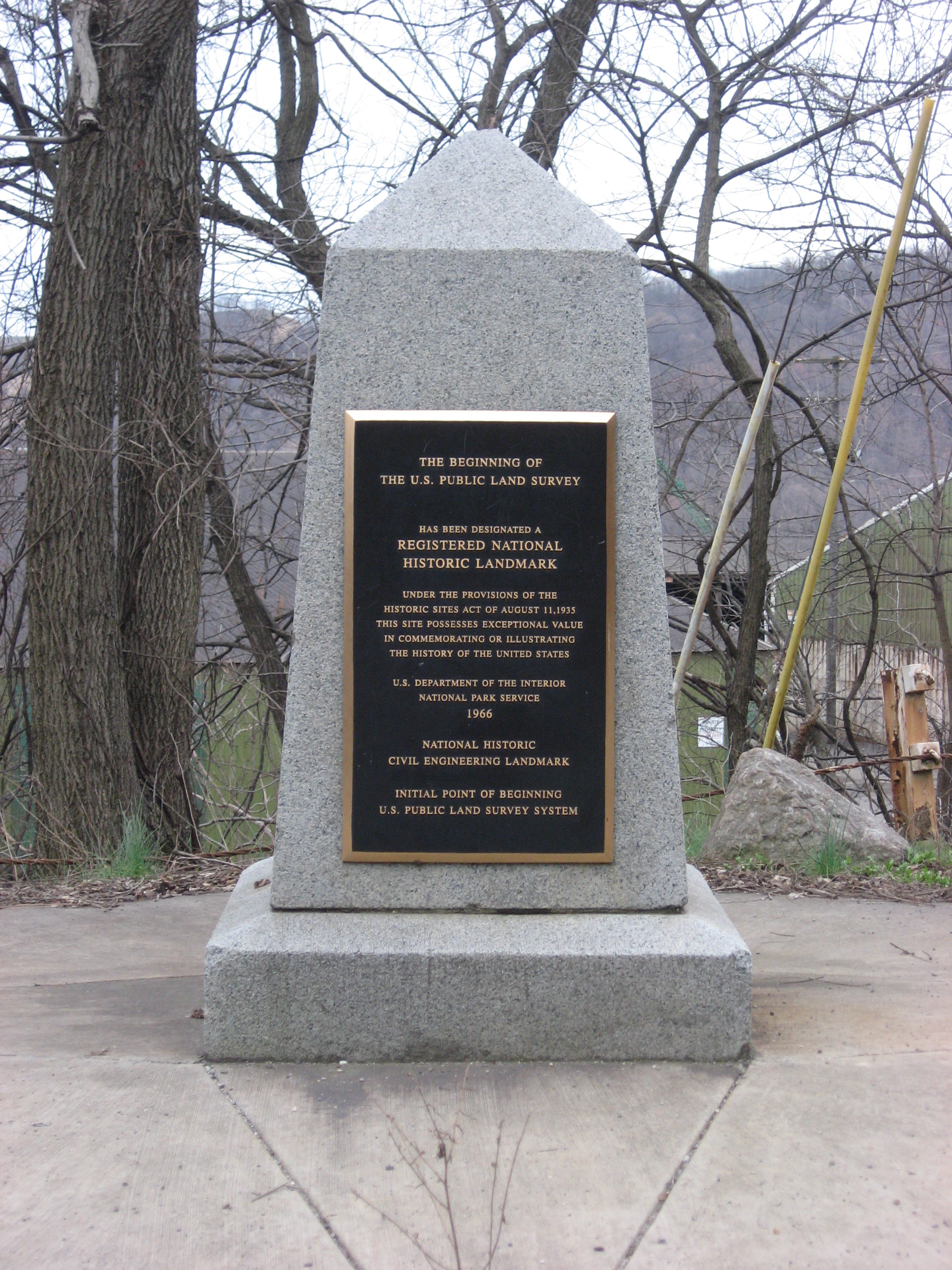
Marker for the Beginning Point of the U.S. Public Land Survey

The point of beginning is a surveyor's mark at the beginning location for the wide-scale surveying of land.

An example is the Beginning Point of the U.S. Public Land Survey that led to the opening of the Northwest Territory, and is the starting point of the surveys of almost all other lands to the west, reaching all the way to the Pacific Ocean. On September 30, 1785, Thomas Hutchins, first and only Geographer of the United States, began surveying the Seven Ranges at the point of beginning.

== Points of beginning ==
- Beginning Point of the U.S. Public Land Survey – East Liverpool, Ohio

== See also ==
- Initial point
