= Phil C. Neal =

American legal scholar

- Born: July 30, 1919; Chicago, Illinois
- Died: September 27, 2016 (aged 97); Chicago, Illinois
- Education: Harvard University (AB, LLB)
- Organization: University of Chicago Law School
- Known for: Academic administration and jurisprudence
- Spouse: Mary Cassidy (m. 1944; div. 1985) Linda Thoren Neal (m. 1985)

Phil C. Neal (July 30, 1919 – September 27, 2016) was an American legal scholar who served as the 6th dean of the University of Chicago Law School from 1963 to 1975. Under his leadership, the law school recruited many influential scholars who contributed to the law and economics movement.

== Early life and education ==
Neal was born on July 30, 1919, in Chicago, Illinois and grew up in Oak Park, Illinois. He graduated from Oak Park and River Forest High School in 1936. As a student, Neal was influenced by his English teacher and debate coach, John Gehlmann, who played a part in moulding Neal's succinct and persuasive writing style. Neal graduated from Harvard University with an A.B. summa cum laude in 1940. In 1943, he graduated from Harvard Law School with a LL.B. magna cum laude and served as president of the Harvard Law Review.

== Career ==
After graduating from law school, Neal worked as a law clerk to Justice Robert H. Jackson on the U.S. Supreme Court between 1943 and 1945. He left his clerkship early to work for Alger Hiss on the United Nations Conference on International Organization conference in San Francisco in April 1945. After the conference, he practised law in San Francisco for three years before joining the Stanford Law School faculty in 1948. As a professor, he taught future Supreme Court Justices Sandra Day O'Connor and William H. Rehnquist. Neal introduced Jackson to Rehnquist, who would later clerk for Jackson.

In 1961, Neal was recruited to the faculty of the University of Chicago Law School by its dean at the time, Edward H. Levi, who intended to have Neal succeed him. He taught elements of the law, antitrust and constitutional law. Between 1963 and 1975, he served as dean. During his tenure, he recruited a number of scholars who have made a significant contribution to the law, including former U.S. Court of Appeals for the Seventh Circuit judge and one of the most influential legal scholars of all time, Richard A. Posner; current U.S. Court of Appeals for the Seventh Circuit judge, Frank H. Easterbrook; the recipient of the 1991 Nobel Memorial Prize in Economic Sciences, Ronald Coase; future deans of the law school, Norval Morris and Gerhard Casper; and prominent scholars and current faculty members Geoffrey R. Stone, Richard A. Epstein and William M. Landes.

During the 1960s, Neal also served as secretary of the Co-ordinating Committee on Multiple Litigation, where he conceived of the concept of multidistrict litigation.

== Retirement and death ==
In 1986, Neal retired from the law school faculty to co-found the Chicago-based firm Neal, Gerber & Eisenberg with 35 other attorneys. As an attorney, Neal advised and represented clients in cases ranging from antitrust and corporate governance issues to school desegregation. In the 1950s and 1960s, Neal was appointed to various government bodies, serving as chairman of the Pacific Regional Enforcement Commission of the Wage Stabilization Board, as executive secretary of the Coordinating Committee for Multi-District Litigation for the U.S. District Courts and as chair of a White House task force on antitrust policy. He was admitted to the Illinois bar and the California bar.

Neal died in 2016 at the age of 97. He is survived by his wife, Linda Thoren Neal, his three sons Stephen, Timothy and Andrew, 13 grandchildren and one great-grandson. He was preceded in death by his son Richard, who died in 2015.

== See also ==
- List of law clerks for the ninth seat of the Supreme Court of the United States
