= List of deans of the University of Chicago Law School =

The following is a list of deans of the University of Chicago Law School.

== List of deans ==
| No. | Picture | Name | From | To |
|---|---|---|---|---|
| 1 | | Joseph Henry Beale | 1902 | 1904 |
| 2 | | James Parker Hall | 1904 | 1928 |
| 3 | | Harry A. Bigelow | 1929 | 1933 |
| 4 | | Wilber G. Katz | 1939 | 1950 |
| 5 | | Edward H. Levi | 1950 | 1962 |
| 6 | | Phil C. Neal | 1963 | 1975 |
| 7 | | Norval Morris | 1975 | 1979 |
| 8 | | Gerhard Casper | 1979 | 1987 |
| 9 | | Geoffrey R. Stone | 1987 | 1994 |
| 10 | | Douglas Baird | 1994 | 1999 |
| 11 | | Daniel Fischel | 1999 | 2001 |
| 12 | | Saul Levmore | 2001 | 2009 |
| 13 | | Michael H. Schill | 2010 | 2015 |
| 14 | | Thomas J. Miles | 2015 | 2025 |
| 15 | | Adam Chilton | 2025 | present |

(Source)
