= Douglas Baird =

American legal scholar

Douglas Gordon Baird
- Born: July 10, 1953 (age 73); Philadelphia, Pennsylvania
- Education: Yale College; Stanford Law School
- Occupation: Professor
- Employer: University of Chicago Law School
- Partner: Julie Gray
- Website: http://www.law.uchicago.edu/faculty/baird

Douglas Gordon Baird (born July 10, 1953) is an American legal scholar, the Harry A. Bigelow Distinguished Service Professor and the 10th dean of the University of Chicago Law School. He joined the faculty in 1980 and served as the dean from 1994 to 1999. He is a specialist in the field of bankruptcy law.

His books, including Elements Of Bankruptcy, Cases, Problems, and Materials on Bankruptcy, Game Theory and the Law and Contract Stories, are used in law schools around the country.

== Early life and education ==
Baird was born in Philadelphia. He grew up in suburban Wynnewood, PA. He grew up with his family on the same street as John Hickenlooper, the junior U.S. Senator from Colorado. His older brother Henry and Hickenlooper were childhood friends.

He received his B.A. in English summa cum laude from Yale College in 1975. He graduated from Stanford Law School in 1979. At Stanford, he was elected to the Order of the Coif and served as the Managing Editor of the Stanford Law Review. Before joining the faculty in 1980, he was a law clerk to Judge Shirley M. Hufstedler and Judge Dorothy W. Nelson, both of the U.S. Court of Appeals for the Ninth Circuit.

== Academic work ==
Baird has written 13 books and 71 articles. He was elected a Fellow of the American Academy of Arts and Sciences in 1996. In 2008, The Emory Bankruptcy Developments Journal awarded Baird with its Distinguished Service Award which honors an individual who makes a sizable impact on the field of bankruptcy. Baird was named a Fellow of the American College of Bankruptcy in 2003. He served as the vice-chair of the National Bankruptcy Conference from 1997 until 2005 and has served as its chair since 2020.

== Publications ==
=== Books ===
- The Unwritten Law of Corporate Reorganizations (Harvard University Press, 2022). ISBN 978-1009061018
- Elements of Bankruptcy, 5th ed. (2020). ISBN 9781599415994
- Reconstructing Contracts (Harvard University Press, 2013). ISBN 978-0674072480
- Cases, Problems, and Materials on Contracts (Foundation Press 9th edition 2008) (with Dawson, Harvey, and Henderson). ISBN 9781543838978
- Economics of Contract Law (Edward Elgar 2007) (editor). ISBN 978 1 84542 652 1
- Contracts Stories (Foundation Press 2007) (editor). ISBN 1587787210
- Elements of Bankruptcy, 4th ed. (2006). ISBN 1599410621
- Elements of Bankruptcy, 3d ed. (2001). ISBN 9781566628686
- Cases, Problems, and Materials on Bankruptcy, 3d ed. (Foundation Press 2000) (with Adler and Jackson). ISBN 1587781549
- Game Theory and the Law (Harvard University Press, 3d revised edition,1998) (with Gertner and Picker). ISBN 0674341112
- Game Theory and the Law (Harvard University Press 1994) (with Gertner and Picker)
- The Elements of Bankruptcy (Foundation Press, revised edition,1993). ISBN 1566620929
- The Elements of Bankruptcy (Foundation Press, 1992). ISBN 978-1-59941-725-7
- Cases, Problems and Materials on Bankruptcy, 2d ed. (Little, Brown 1990) (with Thomas Jackson). ISBN 0316076813
- Cases, Problems, and Materials on Security Interests in Personal Property, 2d ed. (Foundation Press 1987) (with Jackson). ISBN 0882775499
- Cases, Problems, and Materials on Bankruptcy (Little, Brown 1985) (with Jackson). ISBN 0316076775
- Cases, Problems, and Materials on Security Interests in Personal Property (Foundation Press 1984) (with Jackson). ISBN 0882775499

=== Articles ===
- "Bankruptcy's Undiscovered Country" 25 Emory Bankruptcy Developments Journal 1 (2008).
- "Other People’s Money," 60 Stanford Law Review 1309 (2008) (with Todd Henderson).
- "The Young Astronomers," 74 University of Chicago Law Review 1641 (2007).
- “Tribute to Bernard Meltzer,” 74 University of Chicago Law Review 417 (2007).
- "The Prime Directive," 75 University of Cincinnati Law Review 921 (2007) (with Robert K. Rasmussen).
- "Technology, Information, and Bankruptcy," 2007 University of Illinois Law Review 305.
- "Beyond Recidivism," 54 Buffalo Law Review 343 (2006) (with Robert K. Rasmussen).
- "Legal Approaches to Restricting Distributions to Shareholders: The Role of Fraudulent Transfer Law," 7 European Business Org. L. Rev. 199 (2006).
- “Reconstructing Contracts: Hamer v. Sidway,” in Contracts Stories 162, Douglas G. Baird, ed. (Foundation Press 2006).
- "Absolute Priority, Valuation Uncertainty, and the Reorganization Bargain," 115 Yale Law Journal 1930 (2006) (with Bernstein).
- "Private Debt and the Missing Lever of Corporate Governance," 154 University of Pennsylvania Law Review 1209 (2006) (with Rasmussen).
- "Discharge, Waiver, and the Behavioral Undercurrents of Debtor-Creditor Law," 73 University of Chicago Law Review 17 (2006).
- "The Boilerplate Puzzle," 104 Michigan Law Review 933 (2006).
- "Serial Entrepreneurs and Small Business Bankruptcies," 105 Columbia Law Review 2310 (2005) (with Morrison).
- "Adversary Proceedings in Bankruptcy: A Sideshow," 79 American Bankruptcy Law Journal 951 (2006) (with Morrison).
- "Substantive Consolidation Today," 47 Boston College Law Review 5 (2005).
- "The Story of INS v. AP," Intellectual Property Stories (2006).
- "¿ Bogart permanece en boga?: Rights of publicity en la era digital," Ano XIV, No. 29 ius et veritas 179 (2005).
- "Remembering Pine Gate," 38 John Marshall L. Rev. 5 (2004).
- "Secured Lending and Its Uncertain Future," 25 Cardozo L. Rev. 1789 (2004).
- "The New Face of Chapter 11," 12 Am. Bankr. L. Rev. 69 (2004).
- "Chapter 11 at Twilight," 56 Stan. L. Rev. 673 (2003) (with Rasmussen).
- "Enron and the Long Shadow of Stat. 13 Eliz.," in Enron: Corporate Fisacos and their Implications (Foundation Press 2004).
- "In Coase's Footsteps," 70 U. Chi. L. Rev. 23 (2003).
- "Llewellyn's Heirs," 62 Louisiana L. Rev. 1287 (2002).
- "The End of Bankruptcy," 55 Stan. L. Rev. 751 (2002) (with Rasmussen).
- "Four (or Five) Easy Lessons From Enron," 55 Vand. L. Rev. 1787 (2002) (with Rasmussen).
- "Control Rights, Priority Rights, and the Conceptual Foundations of Corporate Reorganizations," 87 Va. L. Rev. 921 (2001) (with Rasmussen).
- "Does Bogart Still Get Scale? Rights of Publicity in the Digital Age," 4 Green Bag 2d 357 (2001).
- "Bankruptcy Decisionmaking," 17 J. Law Econ. & Org. 356 (2001) (with Morrison).
- "Commercial Norms and the Fine Art of the Small Con," 98 Mich. L. Rev. 2716 (2000).
- "Boyd's Legacy and Blackstone's Ghost," 1999 Supreme Court Review 393 (with Rasmussen).
- "Optimal Timing and Legal Decisionmaking: The Case of the Liquidation Decision in Bankruptcy" (November 1999) (Chicago Working Papers in Law and Economics No. 86 (2d Series)) (with Morrison).
- "Bankruptcy's Uncontested Axioms," 108 Yale L.J. 573 (1998).
- "Fraudulent Conveyance," in 2 New Palgrave Dictionary of Law and Economics 192 (1998).
- "Game Theory and the Law," in 2 New Palgrave Dictionary of Law and Economics 192 (1998).
- "Leveraged Buyouts," in 2 New Palgrave Dictionary of Law and Economics 192 (1998).
- "The Importance of Priority," 82 Cornell L. Rev. 1420 (1997).
- "The Hidden Virtues of Chapter 11" (March 1997) (Chicago Working Papers in Law and Economics No. 43 (2d Series)).
- "The Future of Law and Economics: Looking Forward," 64 U. Chi. L. Rev. 1129 (1997).
- "Security Interests Reconsidered," 80 U. Va. L. Rev. 2249 (1994).
- "The Reorganization of Closely Held Firms and the 'Opt Out' Problem," 72 Wash. U. L. Rev. 913 (1994).
- "Revisiting Auctions in Chapter 11," 36 J. Law & Econ. 633 (1993).
- "Introduction: Taking Stock," 36 J. Law & Econ. 237 (1993).
- Book Review: Thinking Strategically, Avinash K. Dixit & Barry J. Nalebuff, 100 Journal of Political Economy 1278 (1992).
- "The Dark Side of Chapter 11: A Comment on Professor Triantis' Article," 20 Canadian Business L.J. 261 (1992).
- "The Initiation Problem in Bankruptcy," 11 International Review of Law and Economics 223 (1991).
- "Fraudulent Conveyances, Agency Costs, and Leveraged Buyouts," 20 J. Legal Stud. 1 (1991).
- "Jury Trials After Granfinanciera," 65 Am. Bankr. L.J. 1 (1991).
- "Self-Interest and Cooperation in Long-term Contracts," 19 J. Legal Stud. 583 (1990).
- "Avoiding Powers under the Bankruptcy Code," in Current Developments in Bankruptcy and Reorganization 1990 (PLI 1990).
- "The Seventh Amendment and Jury Trials in Bankruptcy," 1989 S. Ct. Rev. 261.
- "Property Rights, Priority Rights, and Ostensible Ownership: The Deep Structure of Article 9," in Secured Transactions Under the Uniform Commercial Code, P. Coogan, W. Hogan, D. Vagts, & J. McDonnell (1988).
- "Loss Distribution, Forum Shopping, and Bankruptcy: A Reply to Warren," 54 U. Chi. L. Rev. 815 (1987).
- "A World Without Bankruptcy," 50 Law & Contemp. Probs. 173 (1987).
- "The Uneasy Case for Corporate Reorganizations," 15 J. Legal Stud. 127 (1986).
- Book Review, Commercial Transactions, Jonathan A. Eddy & Peter Winship (1985), 36 J. Legal Educ. 433 (1986).
- "Changing Technology and Unchanging Doctrine: Sony Corp. v. Universal Studios," 1984 S. Ct. Rev. 237.
- "Notice Filing and the Problem of Ostensible Ownership," 12 J. Legal Stud. 53 (1983).
- "Common Law Intellectual Property and the Legacy of International News Service v. Associated Press," 50 U. Chi. L. Rev. 411 (1983).
- "Bankruptcy Procedure and State-Created Rights: The Lessons of Gibbons and Marathon," 1982 S. Ct. Rev. 25.
- "Standby Letters of Credit in Bankruptcy," 49 U. Chi. L. Rev. 130 (1982).
- "A Simple Noncooperative Bargaining Model of Corporate Reorganizations," 20 J. Legal Stud. 311 (1991) (with Randal Picker).
- "Bargaining After the Fall and the Contours of the Absolute Priority Rule," 55 U. Chi. L. Rev. 738 (1988) (with Jackson).
- "Fraudulent Conveyance Law and its Proper Domain," 38 Vand. L. Rev. 829 (1985) (with Jackson).
- "Corporate Reorganizations and the Treatment of Diverse Ownership Interests: A Comment on Adequate Protection of Secured Creditors in Bankruptcy," 51 U. Chi. L. Rev. 97 (1984) (with Jackson).
- "Information, Uncertainty, and the Transfer of Property," 13 J. Legal Stud. 299 (1984) (with Jackson).
- "Kovacs and Toxic Wastes in Bankruptcy," 36 Stan. L. Rev 1199 (1984) (with Jackson).
- "Possession and Ownership: An Examination of the Scope of Article 9," 35 Stan. L. Rev. 175 (1983) (with Jackson).
- "Rules, Standards, and the Battle of the Forms: A Reassessment of §2-207," 68 Va. L. Rev. 1217 (1982) (with Robert Weisberg).
- "Human Cannonballs and the First Amendment," 30 Stan. L. Rev. 1185 (1978).

== Other positions ==
- Visiting professor of law, Yale University (2000)
- Robert Braucher Visiting professor of law, Harvard University (1993)
- Visiting professor of law, Stanford University, (1987–1988)
- Scholar in Resident, American College of Bankruptcy (since 2009)
- Board of Directors, American Law Deans Association (1997–1999)
- Board of Directors, American Law and Economics Association (1992–1995; 2008–present)
