= Douglas H. Parker =

American lawyer

Douglas Hugh Parker (August 19, 1926 – September 22, 2019) was an American law school professor. He began his law teaching career as a Harry A. Bigelow Teaching Fellow (1952–53) at the University of Chicago Law School and later taught as a professor of law at the University of Colorado College of Law (1953–75) and the Brigham Young University J. Reuben Clark Law School (1975-1991).

== Early life and education ==
Parker, the second of four children, was born in August 1926 in Salt Lake City, Utah to Casper Hugh Parker and Carrie Hansen. He graduated from high school at the age of 16 and immediately enrolled at the University of Utah. During his second year at the university, Parker took the medical school admissions test and was accepted.

In 1944 during World War II, Parker delayed attending medical school and enlisted in the United States Navy. He was assigned to the Great Lakes Naval Base near Chicago where he served as a scrub nurse, handling instruments in the operating room during more than 400 operations.

Upon the close of World War II, Parker returned to Salt Lake City and subsequently served a two-year mission for the Church of Jesus Christ of Latter-day Saints in the Eastern United States (1946–48). During his mission service, Parker served as a counselor in the mission presidency. Later in life (1977–80) he served as a bishop of a LDS ward in Provo, Utah.

After his church mission, Parker continued school at the University of Utah where he graduated with a B.A. in political science. He then entered law school at the University of Utah. At law school, Parker was a founding editor of the University of Utah Law Review and graduated first in his class.

== Career ==
In 1952, upon graduation from law school, Parker received a distinguished Harry A. Bigelow Teaching Fellowship at the University of Chicago Law School, a fellowship given to top law school graduates in the country. At Chicago, Parker taught courses in Legal Writing, Legal Research, and Legal Analysis.

In 1953, Parker accepted a faculty position at the University of Colorado College of Law. As a professor of law, he taught courses primarily involving client care-taking: civil procedure, wills and trusts, equitable remedies, damages, and legal ethics. While at Colorado, Parker and colleague William J. Bowe accepted an invitation to revise the multi-volume treatise Page on Wills, (a five-volume treatise of the United States' law on wills and decedents' estates) expanding it to eight volumes. Parker taught at the University of Colorado for 22 years.

In 1975, Parker accepted a faculty position at Brigham Young University's J. Reuben Clark Law School where he sought to expand his intellectual grasp of the province and function of law in teaching a variety of new subjects of a comparative law nature: Federal Indian law, Roman law, Jewish law, Jurisprudence (Legal Philosophy), Professional Responsibility (Legal Profession and Legal Ethics), and Conflicts of Laws.

In 1986, Parker was the first law professor to be awarded BYU's Karl G. Maeser distinguished teaching award. He taught at BYU until 1991 when he retired. In recognition of Parker's contributions to legal education, a former student established in Parker's honor the "Douglas H. Parker Award." The award is presented annually to the student who attains the highest grade in Jurisprudence or Federal Indian Law.

Following his retirement, Parker continued occasionally to teach at other law schools as a visiting professor. When teaching in China with his wife Corene (1975–76), he was awarded the Excellent Teacher Award by the Shandong Province Education Commission.

== Faculty positions ==
- Bigelow Teaching Fellowship, University of Chicago, 1952–53
- Professor of Law, University of Colorado, 1953–75
- Professor of Law, J. Reuben Clark Law School, Brigham Young University, 1975–91

== Visiting faculty positions ==
- University of Utah College of Law, (American Indian Law), Summer 1979
- University of Arizona School of Law, (CLEO-Legal Analysis & Writing), Summer 1980, 1987
- University of Missouri – Columbia School of Law, (Wills & Trusts), Summer 1981
- University of Alabama School of Law, (Professional Responsibility), Summer 1982
- Hebrew University, Jerusalem, Visiting Research Professor, 1983
- University of New Mexico School of Law, (CLEO-Legal Analysis & Writing ), Summer 1985
- Stetson University College of Law, Culverhouse Chair Professor of Law, (Federal Indian Law; Law and Religion)1994
- Shandong Medical University, Jinan, Shandong, P.R. China, Certified Foreign Expert, (English reading, writing, listening, speaking to post-graduate doctors) 1995–96
- Concordia International University Estonia, Tallinn, Estonia, (Roman Law), 1998
- BYU Hawaii, (Jewish History, Tradition, and Law), Spring 2004

== Membership in professional and honorary associations ==
- International Association of Jewish Lawyers and Jurists (Honorary Membership)
- International Association for the Philosophy of Law and Social Philosophy
- Institute of Judicial Administration
- Institute of Jewish Law
- The Jewish Law Association (Member of International Executive Committee, 1990–91)
- Colorado Bar Association
- Utah Bar Association
- Order of the Coif
- Phi Kappa Phi

== Professional activities and community service ==
- Wrote questions for the California Bar Examination for ten years (Wills)
- Former chairman, Atomic Energy Committee, Colorado Bar Association (1955–57)
- Former legal consultant to and member of Technical Advisory Committee on Radiation Protection, Colorado Department of Public Health
- Former member, Junior College Study Committee of Board of Education, Boulder County RE-2 School District
- Former chairman, arbitration panel under Colorado Teacher Tenure Act
- Former member, board of directors, Colorado Continuing Legal Education, Inc.
- Member, Statutory Revision Committee, Probate and Trust Law Section, Colorado Bar Association
- Faculty director and participating instructor, Fraud Investigator Conference (nine two-week national conferences, 1967–73, funded and sponsored by the United States Bureau of Employment Security, U.S. Dept. of Labor)
- Faculty director and participating instructor, Appeals Referees Conference (two two-week national conferences, 1971–72, funded and sponsored by the United States Bureau of Employment Security, U.S. Dept. of Labor)
- Special investigator (1972), Colorado Commission on Judicial Qualifications (to conduct investigation into charges of misconduct and to make recommendations concerning institution of formal discipline hearings against offending judges)
- Faculty member (1975) Annual Educational Conference, National College of Probate Judges
- Former member, Ethics Advisory Committee, Utah State Bar, 1983

== Major publications ==
=== Books ===
- Bowe-Parker Revision: Pages on Wills. Cincinnati, Ohio: Anderson Co., 1965. 8v.,

6646 pp.

- Title XX, “Legal Problems of Radiation Exposure in Uranium Mining and Milling.”

American Law of Mining. Albany, N.Y.: Matthew Bender, 1960, Vol. 4 1-74.

- Colorado Practice Methods. St. Paul, West Publishing Co., 1956. 2 v. author of Ch. 15.
  - “Forcible Entry and Detainer;” Ch. 25, “Statutory Change of Name;” Ch. 40, **“Discovery, Perpetuation of Testimony and Pre-Trial;”
  - Ch. 41, “Preparation for Trial.”
- Materials on Civil Procedure (original work and selected materials). (Privately

reproduced for classroom use). 111 pp.

- Cases and Materials on Federal Indian Law (Privately reproduced for classroom

use). 300 pp.

- Readings in Jewish Law (Privately reproduced for classroom use). 1500 pp. (1981).
- Materials in Law and Religion (Privately reproduced for classroom use). 581 pp. (1984)

=== Articles ===
- “Some Tax Title Problems in Utah,” 3 Utah Law Review 97-112 (1952)
- “Highlights of the 1955 Colorado Legislative Session – Wills, Decedent’s Estates and

Damages,” 28 Rocky Mountain Law Review 83-91 (1955).

- “The Need for State Atomic Energy Programs in the West,” 29 Rocky Mountain Law

Review 296-359 (1957).

- “Some Legal Implications for Personnel Officers,” 24 Journal of the National

Association of Women Deans and Counselors 198-202 (1961).

- “Normative Criteria for the Validity of Ordering Ideas,” 5 Archiv für Rechts- und

Sozialphilosophie 63 (1968).

- “From Sensed Injustice to Natural, Legal, and Human Rights,” printed in Human

Rights, Jay Stewart Publications, Inc., 1971, 257–262.

- “Probate and Trusts, 1971 Annual Survey of Colorado Law” 117–126, published by

Continuing Legal Education in Colorado.

- “Rhetoric, Ethics and Manipulation,” 5 Philosophy and Rhetoric 69-87 (1972).

Published by The Pennsylvania State University Press, University Park, Pennsylvania and London. This article was included with other essays and republished in the book Perspective in Mormon Ethics. Publisher Press, 1984, D. Hill, Editor.

- “Periodic Recertification of Lawyers: A Comparative Study of Programs for

Maintaining Professional Competence,” 1974 Utah Law Review 463–490, reprinted in 54 Michigan State Bar Journal 768-795 (1975).

- “Survey of Recent Literature,” (abstracts of articles on Jewish Law that appeared in

United States law reviews and law journals, 1980–85), 7 The Jewish Law Annual, 255-302 (1988).

- “Victory in Defeat – Polygamy and the Mormon Legal Encounter with the Federal

Government,” Cardozo Law Review 805-819 (1990).

- Review: Handbook of the Law of Evidence. By Charles T. McCormick. St. Paul: West

Publishing Co., 1954, pp. 712. Reviewed in 8 Journal of Legal Education 257 (1954).

- Review: Colorado Rules Brief. By Jack W. Hosford. Denver, Colorado: Privately

Published. 2 v., 1630 pp. Reviewed in 31 Rocky Mountain Law Review 119 (1958).

- Review: The Voice of Modern Trials. By Melvin M. Belli. San Francisco: The Belli

Foundation, 1960, 2 v. Reviewed in 33 Rocky Mountain Law Review 261 (1961).

- Review: Cases and Materials on Professional Responsibility. By Maynard E. Pirsig.

St. Paul: West Publishing Co., 1965, pp. xxvii, 388. Reviewed in 19 Journal of Legal Education 228 (1966).

- "Encyclopedia of Mormonism," 5 v., Macmillan Publishing Co., 1992, entries on "Divine and Eternal Law," (with Carl Hawkins) v. 2, pp. 808–810, "Law of Moses," (with Zeev Falk) v. 2, pp. 810–812 (1992).
- "Conversations with Professors, Judges, Lawyers, and Rabbis in Israel," 3 volumes, transcribed from professional journals kept in connection with a professional development leave as a visiting research professor at the Hebrew University of Jerusalem, School of Law, Mount Scopus, Jerusalem, 1983. (The three volumes were used as resource materials for Parker's course in Jewish Law).

== Personal life ==
In 1950 Parker married Corene Cowan. They had seven children; four sons and three daughters, as well as 36 grandchildren. Three of Parker's sons have followed his footsteps and are lawyers. Parker lived a physically active life and ran fifteen marathons, the last being at age 66. Parker also enjoyed cross-country skiing, backpacking, hunting, and fishing, as well as writing essays engaged in philosophy, religion, theological analysis, speculation, and criticism. He produced over 200 such essays in four volumes:

1. Journeys of the Mind, 1985–2001
2. After Midnight Thoughts, 1989–91
3. A Wee Collection of Innocent Thoughts Experienced While Mowing the Lawn, 2002–03
4. Searching for the Obvious, 2004–06

Parker also enjoyed writing free verse poetry and wrote over 90 poems. He died in September 2019 at the age of 93.
