= Negotiation Class =

A negotiation class is a newly proposed procedural device intended to encourage settlement when there are large numbers of plaintiffs with claims against the same defendants. It is a type of class action and, as such, requires judicial approval before it can be used.

== Description ==
The negotiation class was recently developed and proposed by scholars Francis McGovern and William Rubenstein in their article "The Negotiation Class: A Cooperative Approach to Class Actions Involving Large Stakeholders." It is a special type of class action that is especially intended for claims by public entities with varying amounts of damages. Just like any other class action, a negotiation class must meet all of the requirements of Rule 23 of the Federal Rules of Civil Procedure. In particular, this includes satisfying 23(a)'s prerequisites of numerosity, commonality, typicality, and adequacy, and 23(b)(3)'s predominance and superiority requirements.

The negotiation class tries to solve the problem of 'large value opt-outs,' This is a situation where plaintiffs with the highest damages leave the class to instead litigate individually, because they believe individual litigation will be more profitable than receiving some unknown settlement amount. These opt-outs result in defendants becoming far less likely to settle with the remaining class members, as they know that settlement will not bring 'global peace.' In other words, even if they settle with the class, they will still have to deal with expensive lawsuits in the future from high-value plaintiffs. The negotiation class hopes to get rid of this opt-out problem by, in effect, letting all of the plaintiffs know what share of the settlement they will receive before they start negotiating with the defendant. By doing so, the class will become set before negotiations begin, ideally with the high-value plaintiffs as part of the class because they are satisfied with their share.

The exact process for the negotiation class can be broken down into five steps: 1) determining the share for each plaintiff; 2) asking the judge to certify the class under 23(b)(3); 3) providing notice to all of the potential class members of their share; 4) negotiations between plaintiffs and defendants to reach a settlement; 5) a vote by all members of the class on the settlement reached, which requires a supermajority to pass.

== Cases ==
The negotiation class has only been used in one case so far. It was first certified by Judge Dan Polster in the Northern District of Ohio for claims by the governmental entities in the Opioid Multidistrict Litigation (MDL). In the certification order, Judge Polster determined that the Opioid MDL met all of the Rule 23 requirements, and that the device provided needed flexibility to try to achieve settlement in this particular case. The MDL is composed solely of public entities, cities and counties, with varying amounts of damages, reflecting how hard their citizens have been affected by the opioid epidemic.

As of May 25, 2020, this certification is on appeal before the Sixth Circuit.

== Criticism ==
This is relatively new proposal, so as of May 2020, there has not been very extensive criticism. The main criticisms can be found in the brief appealing the negotiation class certification and a blog post by a prominent legal scholar in the field of civil procedure.

In appellants' brief challenging the certification, Part I specifically addresses the flaws in the negotiation class device itself. The main arguments put forward are that: 1) the negotiation class is inconsistent with the text of Rule 23; 2) its design gets rid of important procedural protections intended to help absent class members; and 3) its certification removes much of the bargaining power from plaintiffs and instead gives it to defendants. These are the arguments the Sixth Circuit will presumably address.

In Professor Tidmarsh's criticism, he points out that a lot of the important details regarding the voting mechanism are missing from the proposal. He further explains that some "theoretical underpinnings" are flawed, as well as the practical means of evaluating claims. Specifically, he points out that parties' claims do not just differ by claim amount, but also by the relative strength and weakness, which is not factored into determining shares among class members. He ends by predicting that the Supreme Court will look unfavorably on this "novel project."

== See also ==
Class action

Federal Rules of Civil Procedure

Multidistrict Litigation
