= Bernard D. Meltzer =

American legal scholar

Bernard David Meltzer
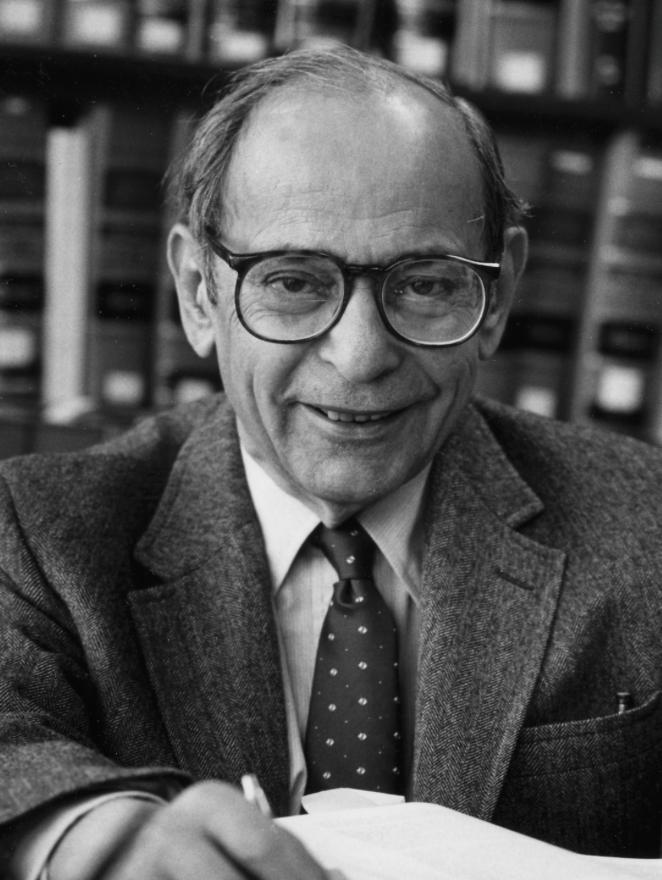
- Meltzer at the University of Chicago Law School
- Born: November 21, 1914; Philadelphia, Pennsylvania
- Died: January 4, 2007 (aged 92); Chicago, Illinois
- Education: University of Chicago (A.B.); University of Chicago Law School (LL.B.); Harvard Law School (LL.M.)
- Occupations: Law professor, attorney
- Organization: University of Chicago Law School
- Known for: Nuremberg trials and labor law
- Spouse: Jean Sulzberger (m. 1947)
- Children: 4

Bernard David Meltzer was an American legal scholar who was a professor of law at the University of Chicago Law School and a prosecutor at the Nuremberg trials. He was a leading scholar on labor law and a drafter of the U.N. Charter.

== Early life and education ==
Meltzer was born on November 21, 1914, in Philadelphia, Pennsylvania. His parents, Julius Meltzer and Rose Wolkov Meltzer, were Russian immigrants, and he was one of six children. After graduating from high school, Meltzer enrolled at Temple University but left after four semesters to study at the University of Chicago in 1934. He described the move as “an exhilarating and transforming experience.” He graduated with an A.B. in 1935 before completing a J.D. from the University of Chicago Law School in 1937, graduating first in his class. Meltzer received a graduate fellowship to study at Harvard Law School, where he obtained a LL.M. in 1938. He married Jean Sulzberger in 1947.

== Career ==
=== Before and during World War II ===
Between 1938 and 1940, Meltzer worked in the general counsel's office of the Securities and Exchange Commission and later as special assistant to chairman Jerome Frank, a fellow Chicago alumnus. He moved back to Chicago in 1940 to join the law firm Mayer, Meyer, Austrian and Platt, but the following year he was called back to Washington, D.C. to work as the legal consultant to the National Defense Advisory Commission in the midst of the Second World War. Between 1941 and 1943, Meltzer served in the State Department as Special Assistant to the Assistant Secretary of State Dean Acheson and as Acting Chief of the Foreign Funds Control Division.

In his roles at the State Department, Meltzer successfully helped to persuade the State and Justice Departments to adopt a broader interpretation of the Neutrality Acts to allow the delivery of Lend-Lease shipments to American allies in the war. He also helped to draft the initial Lend-Lease agreements with allied nations and attempted, without success, to gain government approval for funding to liberate Jews in Eastern Europe who were being threatened with deportation and extermination by Nazi forces. On December 8, 1941, the day after the Attack on Pearl Harbor, Meltzer tried to enlist in the Navy but was ultimately rejected due to his poor eyesight. In 1943, he was commissioned as a naval officer and assigned to the Office of Strategic Services. When the war ended, Meltzer was assigned to assist in drafting the U.N. Charter in April 1945.

=== Nuremberg trials ===
In 1946, Meltzer was recruited by Francis M. Shea, a New Dealer and member of the Franklin D. Roosevelt administration, to serve as a prosecutor at the Nuremberg Trials. Meltzer led a team of lawyers who were tasked with gathering evidence in support of the “economic case” against the Nazis, targeting defendants who had assisted on financing or building the Nazi war effort with knowledge of the Nazis' motives, as well as defendants who were responsible for plundering occupied German territories and for deporting and exploiting millions of slave laborers. Meltzer carried out the pre-trial interrogation of Hermann Goering, Hitler's second-in-command, and presented the prosecution case at trial against Walther Funk, who was the Economics Minister and President of the Reichsbank during the war. The evidence adduced by Meltzer of Funk's involvement in the genocide was later used by French and Soviet prosecutors. Meltzer was also involved in the presentation of the concentration camp case.

=== University of Chicago Law School ===
After returning from Nuremberg, Meltzer joined the University of Chicago Law School faculty in 1946. He developed the first course in the U.S. on international organizations. and later specialized in evidence and labor law. While at the law school, he developed ties with distinguished legal scholars Harry Kalven and Hans Zeisel, both of whom assisted Meltzer with the establishment of the law school's Jury Project to integrate the techniques and methodologies of the social sciences into legal research, and Nobel laureates Milton Friedman, George Stigler and Ronald Coase. Meltzer later shifted his attention to labor law, on which he published widely, in addition to arbitration and evidence. University of Michigan Law School dean and professor, Theodore J. St. Antoine, described Meltzer as “the finest craftsman” among scholars of labor law observing that there was “no person in the entire field of labor relations who is so adept at asking all the right questions, recognizing all the competing interests, and exposing all the ancient shibboleths.” Meltzer remained at the law school until 1985, having served as the James Parker Hall Professor of Law and the Edward H. Levi Distinguished Service Emeritus Professor.

== Retirement and death ==
Following his retirement in 1985, Meltzer continued to write and consult. He practiced as an attorney at Sidley Austin in Chicago and also served as a labor arbitrator, a special master in labor disputes, Chairman of the Cook County Hospital Committee, a member of the Illinois Civil Service Commission, a salary arbitrator for Major League Baseball and a consultant to the U.S. Department of Labor and the U.S. Department of Defense. He also advised attorneys representing clients during the McCarthy Era and successfully represented clients in loyalty investigations. He was a member of the American Academy of Arts and Sciences and the American Law Institute. Meltzer declined an offer from President Richard M. Nixon to serve as chair of the National Labor Relations Board.

Meltzer died in 2007 at the age of 92. He was survived by his wife, Jean Sulzberger, his daughters Joan FitzGibbon and Susan Yost and son Daniel Meltzer, and six grandchildren. His late son, Daniel Meltzer, served as chair of the President's Intelligence Advisory Board under the Obama administration and was a law professor at Harvard Law School.
