= Daniel Fischel =

American academic

Daniel R. Fischel
- Born: December 10, 1950 (age 75); New York City, New York
- Education: Cornell University (BA); Brown University (MA); University of Chicago (JD)

Daniel R. Fischel (born December 10, 1950) is the emeritus Lee and Brena Freeman Professor of Law and Business and the 11th dean of University of Chicago Law School. He co-founded Lexecon, and is now chairman and president of Compass Lexecon.

== Early life and education ==
Fischel was born in New York City. He graduated from Cornell University in 1972, and received a Master of Arts in American history from Brown University in 1974. Fischel received his J.D. cum laude from the University of Chicago Law School in 1977, where he was comment editor of the University of Chicago Law Review and elected to the Order of the Coif.

== Career ==
After graduation, Fischel clerked for Judge Thomas E. Fairchild of the Seventh Circuit Court of Appeals and Justice Potter Stewart of the Supreme Court of the United States. He taught at Northwestern University Law School from 1980 to 1983, the last year of which he was a visiting professor at his alma mater. Fischel joined the University of Chicago Law faculty in 1984, and served as dean from 1998 to 2001, when he resigned due his marriage to another university employee and the university's anti-nepotism policy. During his time as dean, he famously tried to convince Barack Obama that his political career was finished following his resounding defeat to Bobby Rush for U.S. Congress. He also drew controversy in 2009 for his purchase of a condominium in New York for over $8 million, which he sold for nearly $12 million in 2012.

As an expert witness, Fischel testified on behalf of Charles Keating, Ken Lay, and Jeffrey Skilling. His work concerning the collapse of Lincoln Savings and Loan upset plaintiffs' law firm Milberg Weiss, leading Fischel and Lexecon to file a defamation and abuse of process suit, which led to a Supreme Court decision about multi-district litigation (Lexecon Inc. v. Milberg Weiss Bershad Hynes & Lerach, 523 U.S. 26 (1998)) and a $50 million settlement paid to him and/or his firm. A panel of the Tenth Circuit Court of Appeals reversed the conviction of Joseph Nacchio over alleged insider trading of Qwest because Judge Edward Nottingham would not let Fischel testify on Nacchio's behalf. but the entire Circuit en banc reversed the reversal and Nacchio ultimately served jail time (being released in 2013).

Fischel co-authored with Frank Easterbrook The Economic Structure of Corporate Law (Harvard University Press, 1991). His book, "Payback", argued that the prosecution of Michael Milken was unjust.

== See also ==
- List of law clerks for the eighth seat of the Supreme Court of the United States
