= Edward W. Hinton =

Chicago Law School professor (1868-1936)

Edward W. Hinton (1868-1936) was the James Parker Hall Professor of Law at the University of Chicago Law School from 1931 to 1936. Hinton was a scholar of evidence and civil procedure and published an early casebook on pleading standards. Before becoming a law professor, Hinton practiced law in Missouri and lectured at the University of Missouri Law School.

The University of Chicago Law School's moot court competition is named after Professor Hinton.

== Bibliography ==
=== Books ===
- Cases on Code Pleading (1st ed. 1906); (2d ed. 1922); (3d ed. 1932).
- Cases on Trial Practice (1st ed. 1915); (2d ed. 1930).
- Cases on Evidence (1st ed. 1919); (2d ed. 1931).
- Cases on Common Law Pleading (1923) (Cook & Hinton).
- Cases on Equity Pleading (1927).
- Lectures on the Illinois Civil Practice Act (Stenographic Report 1933).

=== Articles ===
- Some Problems in Hearsay and Relevancy in Missouri, iS Law Ser. Mo. B. 3-14 (June 1917).
- Equitable Defenses under Modern Codes, 18 Mich. L. Rev. 717-35 (June I920).
- Substituted Service on Non-Residents, 59 Am. L. Rev. 592–601, 20 Inl. L. Rev. z-8 (May 1925).
- An American Experiment with the English Rules of Court, 20 Iil. L. Rev. 533-45 (February 1926).
- Court Rules for the Regulation of Procedure in the Federal Courts, 13 A.B.A. J. 8 (pt. II, March 1927).
- Arbitration by Jury, 6 Wash. L. Rev. 155-65 (November 1931).
- States of Mind and the Hearsay Rule, i Univ. Chi. L. Rev. 394-423 (January 1934).
- Pleading under the Illinois Civil Practice Act, i Univ. Chi. L. Rev. 580-92 (March 1934).
- Changes in the Exceptions to the Hearsay Rule, 29 Ill. L. Rev. 422-47 (December 1934)
