= Walter J. Blum =

American legal scholar

- Born: August 18, 1918; Chicago, Illinois
- Died: December 18, 1994 (aged 76); Chicago, Illinois
- Education: University of Chicago (A.B.); University of Chicago Law School (LL.B.)
- Organization: University of Chicago Law School
- Known for: Tax law

Walter J. Blum (August 18, 1918 – December 18, 1994) was an American legal scholar who was a professor of law at the University of Chicago Law School. He was a pre-eminent figure in tax law.

== Early life and education ==
Blum was born on August 18, 1918, in Chicago Illinois. He attended the University of Chicago Laboratory Schools between 1929 and 1935. He graduated with an A.B. from the University of Chicago in 1939. In 1941, he obtained a J.D. from the University of Chicago Law School, graduating first in his class. He was a member of the Order of the Coif, Pi Lambda Phi, and Phi Beta Kappa and was editor-in-chief of the University of Chicago Law Review.

== Career ==
Between 1941 and 1943, Blum worked as an attorney in the general counsel's office of the Office of Price Administration in Washington, D.C. He served in the military for three years before returning to the University of Chicago Law School as an assistant professor. He became a tenured professor in 1953 and held the positions of Wilson-Dickinson Professor of Law from 1975 and the Edward H. Levi Distinguished Service Professor of Law from 1985. He became an emeritus professor in 1988. Blum chaired and served on numerous committees at the law school and was a key figure in planning the construction of the new law school building, designed by Eero Saarinen in the 1950s.

Blum was a pre-eminent figure in tax law in the U.S., having published many articles and written four seminal books in the area. Among those books was The Uneasy Case for Progressive Taxation (1953), which he co-authored with Harry Kalven, and which is widely regarded as the most penetrating single critique of income taxation in the area of tax policy. Former Commissioner of Internal Revenue and law professor, Jerome Kurtz, described Blum as "one of the great tax scholars and innovative thinkers of modern times" who "will be remembered as a pioneer in his field". Blum also published widely in the areas of bankruptcy and reorganization.

Between 1963 and 1968, Blum served as a consultant to the Office of the U.S. Secretary of the Treasury, the U.S. Department of Transportation, the Internal Revenue Service and the Administrative Conference of the United States. Since 1973, he had served as a consultant to the Federal Income Tax Project of the American Law Institute and as legal counsel to the Bulletin of the Atomic Scientists since 1948. Blum also designed and directed the law school's annual Federal Tax Conference, regarded as the leading tax conference in the country.

== Retirement and death ==
Blum retired from the law school in 1988 after 59 years of affiliation with the University of Chicago as a student and a professor. He died of cancer in 1994 at the age of 76. At the time, he was survived by two daughters, Wendy Blum Coggins and Catherine Ann Scott, and three grandchildren. His wife, Natalie W. Richter, died in 1987.
