= Alison Siegler =

American criminal defense attorney

- Education: Yale College (BA); Yale Law School (JD)
- Occupation: Lillian E. Kraemer Clinical Professor of Law at University of Chicago Law School

Alison Siegler is the Lillian E. Kraemer Clinical Professor in Public Interest Law at the University of Chicago Law School. She founded and directs the Federal Criminal Justice Clinic. Siegler writes about criminal procedure, pretrial detention, federal bail reform, and sentencing.

== Education and career ==
Siegler graduated magna cum laude from Yale College with a degree in Humanities. Siegler went on to attend Yale Law School, where she earned her Juris Doctor and served as Executive Editor of the Yale Journal of Law & the Humanities and Senior Editor of the Yale Law Journal. She clerked for Judge Robert Gettleman in the United States District Court for the Northern District of Illinois. As of 2025 she is the Lillian E. Kraemer Clinical Professor in Public Interest Law.

Following her clerkship, Siegler served as an E. Barrett Prettyman Fellow at Georgetown University Law Center. From 2002 to 2008, Siegler worked as a federal public defender in Chicago with the Federal Defender Program for the Northern District of Illinois, practicing in both the U.S. District Court for the Northern District of Illinois and the Seventh Circuit Court of Appeals.

In 2008, Siegler joined the faculty of the University of Chicago Law School, where she founded and directs the Federal Criminal Justice Clinic.

Siegler is an elected member of the American Law Institute. She was a member of Senator Dick Durbin's Bipartisan Screening Committee for Federal Judges (2012).

== Legal career ==
From 2014 to 2018, Siegler's Federal Criminal Justice Clinic led a systemic litigation challenge to several dozen sting operations conducted by the Bureau of Alcohol, Tobacco, Firearms and Explosives (ATF). Working with federal public defenders and other attorneys, Siegler's team argued in 43 Chicago cases that the ATF's stings were racially discriminatory. The allegation was heard in a simultaneous hearing by nine Illinois federal District Court judges. In response, prosecutors offered plea deals and dropped charges against the clinic's clients. Siegler was given the Justice John Paul Stevens Award for Outstanding Public Service Work by the Seventh Circuit Bar Association for her work on the cases, and her clinic received the Clinical Legal Education Association Award for Excellence in a Public Interest Case or Project in 2020. In addition, Siegler's clinic's work challenging these sting operations was discussed in a 2026 episode of Last Week Tonight, and Siegler was thanked in the episode's end credits.

Siegler has also led the Federal Criminal Justice Clinic's national advocacy against the federal pretrial detention crisis. In 2019, Siegler testified before the House Judiciary Committee about federal bail reform. In 2020, she was invited to give a presentation to President Biden’s transition team about executive branch policies regarding federal bail. In 2022, the clinic published a report that found federal judges had misapplied federal bail law for decades, improperly jailing and denying lawyers to many defendants. Following the report, Siegler and her students publicly met with Senate Judiciary Committee Chairman Dick Durbin to discuss the report’s findings. Siegler has published opinion pieces about federal jailing in The New York Times, USA Today, The Hill, and the Chicago Tribune.

== Selected publications ==
- End Mandatory Minimums, in Excessive Punishment: How the Justice System Creates Mass Incarceration 77 (Lauren-Brooke Eisen ed., 2024). ISBN 9780231212168.
- Reforming the Federal Criminal System: Lessons from Litigation, 25 J. Gender, Race & Just. 99 (2022) (with Judith P. Miller and Erica K. Zunkel).
- Discovering Racial Discrimination by the Police, 115 Nw. U. L. Rev. 987 (2021) (with William Admussen).
- The Federal Judiciary’s Role in Drug Law Reform in an Era of Congressional Dysfunction, 18 Ohio State J. of Crim. L. 238 (2020) (with Erica K. Zunkel).
- Rethinking Federal Bail Advocacy to Change the Culture of Detention, The Champion 46 (July 2020) (with Erica Zunkel).
- “I Got the Shotgun, You Got the Briefcase”: Criminal Defense Ethics in The Wire, 2018 Univ. of Chi. Legal F. 209 (2018) (with Erica K. Zunkel).
- The Courts of Appeals’ Latest Anti-Booker Rebellion, 82 U. Chi. L. Rev. 201 (2015).
- “‘Death Is Different’ No Longer”: Graham v. Florida and the Future of Eighth Amendment Challenges to Noncapital Sentences, 2010 Sup. Ct. Rev. 327 (2011) (with Barry Sullivan).
- Disparities and Discretion in Fast-Track Sentencing, 21 Fed. Sent’g R. 299 (2009).
- Appendix: Sample Cross Examination, in Terence F. MacCarthy, MacCarthy on Cross Examination (2008).
- The Patriot Act's Erosion of Constitutional Rights, 32 ABA Litig. 18 (Winter 2006).
