= Thomas J. Miles =

American legal scholar

- Education: Tufts University (BA); University of Chicago (PhD); Harvard University (JD)
- Employer: University of Chicago Law School
- Known for: Law and economics, criminal law, jurisprudence

Thomas John Miles is an American legal scholar who is currently the Clifton R. Musser Professor of Law and Economics at the University of Chicago Law School, where he served as Dean from 2015 until 2025. He writes in the areas of law and economics, criminal law and judicial behavior.

== Life and career ==
Miles attended Tufts University as an undergraduate student in the late 1980s. He majored in political science and economics and graduated summa cum laude in 1990 as a member of Phi Beta Kappa. He worked at the Federal Reserve Bank of Boston until 1993 before starting a Ph.D. at the University of Chicago, where he wrote on the economics of crime under Gary Becker. After completing his Ph.D., he attended Harvard Law School and earned a J.D. cum laude. He subsequently worked as a law clerk to Judge Jay Bybee on the United States Court of Appeals for the Ninth Circuit.

Miles began his career at the University of Chicago Law School as an Olin Fellow of Law and Economics in 2004 and then as an assistant professor of law in 2005. In 2009, he was a visiting professor at Columbia Law School. Since 2013, Miles has been the Clifford R. Musser Professor of Law at the University of Chicago Law School, a title previously held by William Landes and, before him, Nobel laureate and former Chicago professor Ronald Coase. Miles has published numerous journal articles in the areas of law and economics, criminal law and judicial behavior, often with an empirical focus. Together with economist Steven Levitt, he edited the book Economics of Criminal Law in 2008. From 2005 to 2013, Miles was an editor of the Journal of Legal Studies. In 2015, he was appointed Dean of the University of Chicago Law School.; he was reappointed to a second term in 2020. He co-teaches a seminar that discusses canonical ideas in American legal thought.
