= Saul Levmore =

American academic

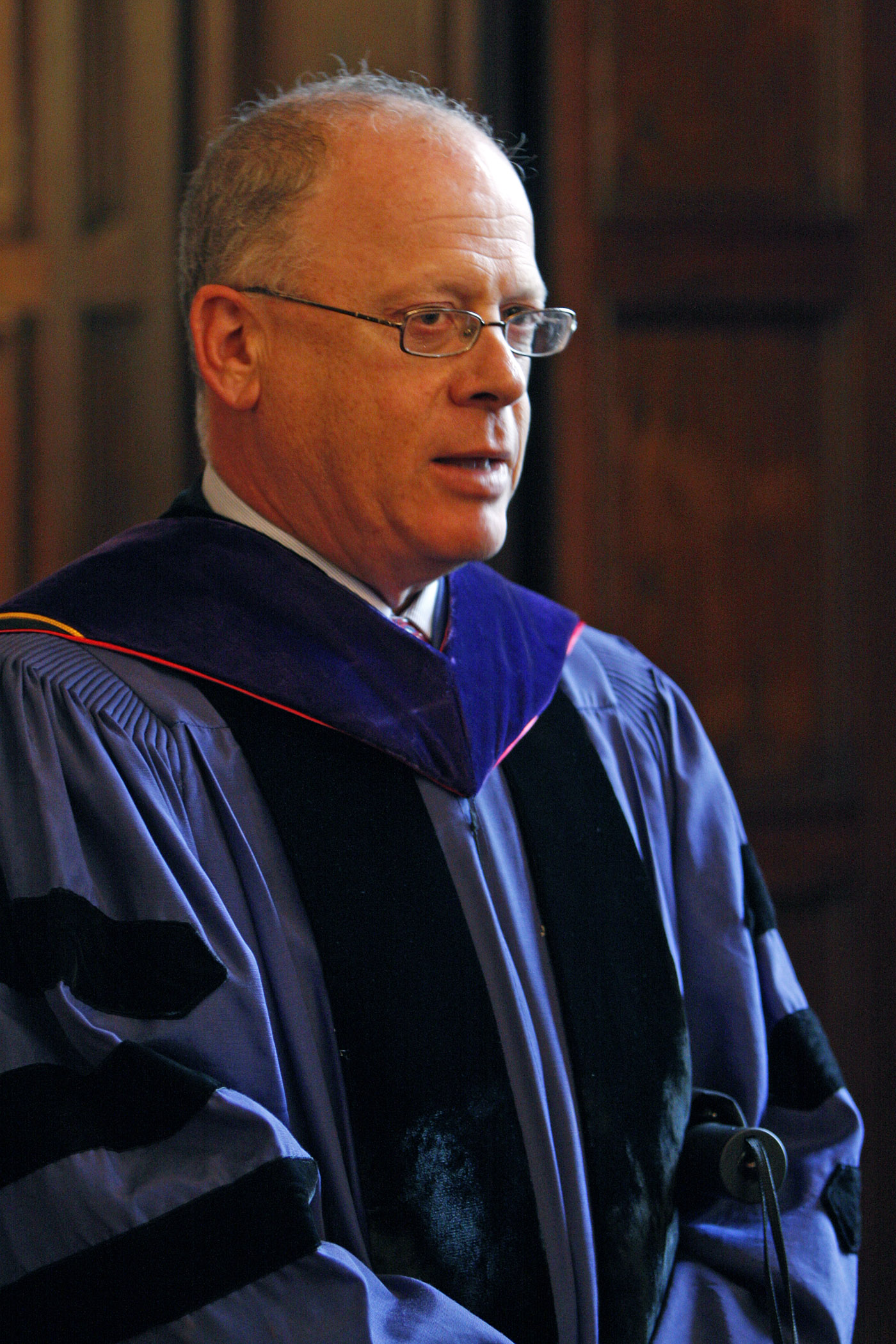
- Levmore in 2009
- Born: 1953 (age 71–72); New York City, New York
- Occupation: William B. Graham Professor of Law at the University of Chicago Law School

Academic background
- Education: Columbia University (BA); Yale University (PhD, JD)

Academic work
- Discipline: Public choice in law and economics

Saul Levmore (born 1953) is the William B. Graham Distinguished Service Professor of Law at the University of Chicago Law School, where he served as the 12th dean of the law school from 2001 to 2009.

== Early life ==
Saul Levmore was born in 1953 in New York City. In 1973, he earned a B.A. from Columbia University, where William Vickrey supervised his thesis. He earned a Ph.D. in Economics from Yale University in 1978; and a J.D. from Yale Law School in 1980. While at Yale, he taught a popular introductory economics course nicknamed "Laughs and Graphs".

== Career ==
Levmore was the Brokaw Professor at the University of Virginia, and he has also been a visiting professor at Yale, Harvard, Toronto, Michigan, and Northwestern Universities. Levmore is an elected member of the American Academy of Arts and Sciences, and a former president of the American Law Deans Association.

During his time at the University of Virginia, Levmore was a signatory to a letter of fifty-one individuals supporting Anita Hill during the confirmation hearing of Clarence Thomas. The letter was addressed to then-Senate Judiciary Committee Chairman Joe Biden and expressed the signatories' "complete confidence in [Hill's] sincerity and good faith."

He joined the faculty of the University of Chicago Law School in 1998 and became Dean in 2001. In March 2009, Levmore stated that he would step down as Dean and return to the faculty and full-time teaching. A search committee was formed and announced Dean Michael Schill of UCLA as his successor on September 8, 2009. Levmore's tenure as Dean ended on December 31, 2009.

Levmore had turned down the Deanship in 1994, citing the time it would take away from his family. Levmore is married to Professor Julie Roin, who also teaches at the Law School.

== Scholarship ==
His current research interests include information markets, public choice, commercial and corporate law, contracts, and torts. He has also written in the areas of game theory, reparations for slavery, insurance and terrorism, product liability, tax law, the development of real and intellectual property rights, and the regulation of obesity. He is widely published on these and other topics, and is the author of Super Strategies for Games and Puzzles and Foundations of Tort Law. He is the co-editor (with Martha C. Nussbaum) of the book The Offensive Internet: Speech, Privacy, and Reputation, published in 2010 by Harvard University Press; he also contributed an article on internet anonymity. Levmore and Nussbaum have also edited a volume entitled "American Guy: Masculinity in American Law and Literature," which was published by Oxford University Press in 2014; Levmore contributed an article on informants and whistle-blowers in literature. In 2017, Levmore and Nussbaum published the book "Aging Thoughtfully: Conversations about Retirement, Romance, Wrinkles, and Regret" with Oxford University Press. The book contains essays on prominent topics connected with aging, each written by one author or the other, often with contrasting positions.

Under his leadership as Dean, the law school embarked on several initiatives designed to address social policy issues, notably the Chicago Judges Project, which studies judicial behavior on the Federal courts, and the Foster Care Project, which looks at legal reforms that will help foster children as they age out of the system. In 2005 Levmore launched, and is a regular contributor to, a unique experiment in legal scholarship, The Faculty Blog at the University of Chicago Law School.
