= James Parker Hall =

American legal scholar

- Born: November 30, 1871; Frewsburg, New York
- Died: May 13, 1928 (aged 56); Chicago, Illinois
- Education: Cornell University (A.B.); Harvard Law School (LL.B.)
- Organization: University of Chicago Law School
- Known for: Constitutional law and torts

James Parker Hall (1871-1928) was an American legal scholar and university administrator who served as the 2nd dean of the University of Chicago Law School from 1904 to 1928. He is the longest-serving dean of the law school.

== Life and career ==
Hall was born on November 30, 1871, in Frewsburg, New York. He graduated from Jamestown High School in 1890. He graduated from Cornell University with an A.B. with honors in 1894. He was a member of Phi Beta Kappa. In 1897, he graduated from Harvard Law School with a LL.B. cum laude and served as an editor of the Harvard Law Review. He was admitted to the New York bar in the same year and practised at a law firm in Buffalo, New York. Between 1897 and 1900, he taught constitutional law and property law at Buffalo Law School and later taught as an associate professor at Stanford University until 1902. Hall joined the faculty of the University of Chicago Law School at its founding in 1902. When the law school's inaugural dean, Joseph Henry Beale, left in 1904, Hall was appointed dean. He taught constitutional law and torts.

Hall was involved in several organizations relating to the development of the law. He was a member of the American Judicature Society and a member of the council and the executive committee of the Association of American Law Schools. During the First World War, he served as a major in the department of Judge Advocate. He also served on the board of trustees of Cornell University and on various boards and committees at the University of Chicago.

Hall died following post-operative complications in 1928.
