= Adam Chilton =

American professor

Adam Stuart Chilton (born July 14, 1984) is an American legal scholar and political scientist who is the dean of the University of Chicago Law School, where he is also the Howard G. Krane Professor of Law and the Walter Mander Research Scholar. Chilton is also the co-editor of The Journal of Law and Economics.

== Education and career ==
Chilton graduated from Yale University in 2007 with a Bachelor of Arts in political science and a Master of Arts in political science. He then earned a second M.A. in political science in 2012, a Ph.D. in political science in 2013, and a J.D. in 2013, all from Harvard University. As a student at Harvard Law School, he won its Addison Brown Prize for scholarship. His dissertation, completed under Beth A. Simmons, was titled, "Essays on the Influence of International Agreements".

Chilton joined the faculty of the University of Chicago Law School in 2013 as a Bigelow Fellow and lecturer. He then became an assistant professor of law in 2014, a full professor of law in 2019, and received the law school's appointment as its Walter Mander Research Scholar in 2017 and then as its Howard G. Krane Professor of Law in 2024.

On May 7, 2025, the University of Chicago announced that Chilton would succeed Thomas J. Miles as dean of its law school. He took office on July 1, 2025.

== Selected publications ==
- Chilton, Adam S.; Rozema, Kyle (May 7, 2024). Trial by Numbers: A Lawyer's Guide to Statistical Evidence. Oxford University Press. ISBN 978-0197747865.
- Chilton, Adam S.; Versteeg, Mila (2020). How Constitutional Rights Matter. Oxford University Press. ISBN 978-0190871451.
