= Philip B. Kurland =

American legal academic

Philip B. Kurland (October 22, 1921 – April 16, 1996) was an American legal scholar.

Kurland was a Brooklyn native, born on October 22, 1921. He graduated from the University of Pennsylvania in 1942, and attended Harvard Law School. Kurland served as editor of the Harvard Law Review in 1944. He became a law clerk for Jerome Frank, and then served Justice Felix Frankfurter in the same role from 1945 to 1946. Kurland worked for the United States Department of Justice, and began his legal practice in New York City before starting his teaching career at Indiana University. Kurland was awarded a Guggenheim Fellowship in 1949. The next year, he joined the Northwestern University faculty. He left Northwestern for the University of Chicago Law School in 1953. Shortly after Kurland began teaching at Chicago, the law school's dean Edward H. Levi called him, which resulted in a lifelong friendship. Kurland was promoted to full professor in 1956, and appointed to the William R. Kenan Jr. Professorship in 1973, followed by designation as a distinguished service professor in 1977. He founded the Supreme Court Review in 1960, serving as the journal's editor until 1988. Kurland died at Bernard Mitchell Hospital on April 16, 1996, aged 74, while seeking treatment for pneumonia.

== See also ==
- List of law clerks for the second seat of the Supreme Court of the United States
