= Lior Strahilevitz =

American legal scholar

Lior Jacob Strahilevitz
- Education: University of California, Berkeley (B.A.); Yale Law School (J.D.)
- Employer: University of Chicago Law School
- Known for: Property law and Privacy law

Lior Jacob Strahilevitz is an American legal scholar who is currently the Sidley Austin Professor of Law at the University of Chicago Law School. He writes primarily in the areas of property law and privacy law. He also regularly teaches the University of Chicago's renowned first-year Elements of the Law course.

== Education and career ==
Strahilevitz graduated from the University of California, Berkeley, with a B.A. summa cum laude in 1996, majoring in political science. He was a member of Phi Beta Kappa. In 1999, he graduated with a J.D. from Yale Law School, where he served as executive editor on the Yale Law Journal and worked as a research assistant to professor and former U.S. Solicitor General Drew S. Days III.

After graduating from law school, Strahilevitz clerked for Judge Cynthia Holcomb Hall on the U.S. Court of Appeals for the Ninth Circuit. Between 2000 and 2002, he worked as an associate at Preston Gates & Ellis in Seattle, Washington.

In 2002, Strahilevitz joined the University of Chicago Law School faculty as an assistant professor of law. He became a professor of law in 2007 and the Sidley Austin Professor of Law in 2011. He served as the law school's Deputy Dean from 2010 to 2012. Strahilevitz has been as a visiting professor at Tel Aviv University and Yale Law School. His teaching and research focuses on private law including property law and contract, land use, privacy law, and law and technology. Strahilevitz has presented his research on dark patterns before the Federal Trade Commission. Strahilevitz's research on dark patterns and privacy law have helped shape regulatory approaches in California and at the federal level, as well as in the United Kingdom. He was the recipient of the law school's Graduating Students' Award for Teaching Excellence in 2010 and 2016. He has served on various committees, including the University of Chicago Committee on the Quality of Academic Life and the law school's Faculty Appointments Committee. Strahilevitz has been a member of the American Law Institute since 2015. He is the co-editor of the casebook Property (2022). Strahilevitz is one of the most-cited active scholars of property law in the United States.
