= Harry Bigelow =

American lawyer

- Born: September 22, 1874; Norwood, Massachusetts
- Died: January 8, 1950 (aged 75); Chicago, Illinois
- Occupation: Law professor
- Spouse: Mary Parker (died 1920)

Harry Augustus Bigelow (September 22, 1874 – January 8, 1950) was an American lawyer. As a Harvard graduate, he worked in private practice in Hawaii before being chosen as one of the first faculty members of the University of Chicago Law School in 1904. Bigelow remained at Chicago for forty years and served as the 3rd dean of the law school from 1929 and 1933. He wrote a number of textbooks and advised the American Law Institute. After retirement, he became a member of the National Loyalty Review Board, established by Harry S. Truman to vet federal employees. In his private life, Bigelow had collections of African and Japanese art and was an avid big game hunter, in the course of which he became one of the first white men to cross the Belgian Congo west of Lake Edward.

== Early life ==
Harry Augustus Bigelow was born in Norwood, Massachusetts, on September 22, 1874. He graduated from Harvard College in 1896 and was awarded a degree from the Harvard Law School in 1899. Bigelow afterwards worked as a clerk in a conveyancing office in Boston and, for one semester, as a part-time lecturer on criminal law at Harvard. From 1900 to 1903 he practiced law in Honolulu, Hawaii, and was a junior member of the Hawaii State Bar Association.

== Chicago ==
The University of Chicago founded its law school in 1902, and in 1904 Bigelow was asked to join as a faculty member by university president William Rainey Harper. Bigelow had been selected by the acting dean Joseph Henry Beale. Bigelow was a keen proponent of the case method of teaching but recognized its limitations in some fields of law. He was promoted to professor in 1908. He specialized in property law and advised the American Law Institute (ALI) in this field. Bigelow published the casebooks The Law of Personal Property and The Law of Rights in Land, which became standard texts in many American law schools. He also published a textbook, Introduction to the Law of Real Property, for students of land law. Bigelow was a contributor to the ALI publications Restatement of the Conflict of Laws, Restatement of the Law of Torts, and Restatement of the Law of Property and was a reporter for the latter until 1929. Bigelow's work on the latter has been subject to harsh criticism, in that he ended up restating Wesley Newcomb Hohfeld's ideas (e.g., the bundle of rights) instead of the actual content of American property law.

In 1929 Bigelow was appointed dean of the University of Chicago Law School and the first John P. Wilson Professor of Law. As dean, he recognized that the effective practice of law required a broader subject knowledge and expanded teaching at the school to include classes in accounting, economics, and psychology. Bigelow was appointed a trustee in bankruptcy for the complicated proceedings of the Chicago-based Insull Utilities Investment Inc. In 1933. Bigelow reached the university's mandatory retirement age in 1939 and ceased to be dean. He was appointed an emeritus professor and continued to take classes in law, property, and future interests for the next five years.

In 1947, he was drafted onto the National Loyalty Review Board by President Harry S. Truman. This body was established by Executive Order 9835 during the Second Red Scare to screen federal employees for "loyalty", with particular regard to avoiding any Communist sympathies. Bigelow served on the body during his final years, in spite of failing health.

== Private life ==
While living in Hawaii in 1902, Bigelow married Mary Parker; the couple had no children and she died in 1920. Bigelow had an interest in art, particularly African and Japanese, and had a particularly notable collection of Japanese prints. He was also interested in motoring, golf, overseas travel, big-game hunting, the study of other cultures, and exploration of remote areas. Bigelow accompanied Herbert E. Bradley and his wife, Mary Hastings Bradley, on their African big-game-hunting expeditions of 1924 and 1925. By doing so, he became one of the first white people to cross the unexplored Belgian Congo west of Lake Edward. Bigelow was a member of the American Academy of Arts and Sciences and the Order of the Coif.

Bigelow died of heart failure in Chicago on January 8, 1950. He left a substantial bequest to the University of Chicago, which allowed it to found a professorship in his name.
