= Geoffrey R. Stone =

American legal scholar (born 1946)

- Born: 1946 (age 79–80)
- Education: University of Pennsylvania (BS); University of Chicago (JD)
- Occupation: Legal scholar

Geoffrey R. Stone (born 1946) is an American legal scholar and noted First Amendment scholar. He is currently the Edward H. Levi Distinguished Service Professor of Law at the University of Chicago Law School, where he served as the 9th dean from 1987 to 1994, then as the provost of the University of Chicago from 1994 to 2002.

== Biography ==
Stone completed a B.S. degree in 1968 at the University of Pennsylvania, and a J.D. degree in 1971 at the University of Chicago Law School, where he was editor-in-chief of the University of Chicago Law Review. He clerked for Judge J. Skelly Wright of the U.S. Court of Appeals for the D.C. Circuit in 1971–72, and then for Justice William J. Brennan Jr. of the Supreme Court of the United States in 1972–73.

Stone has been a law professor at Chicago since 1973. He served as dean of the Law School from 1987 to 1994, and as provost of the University of Chicago from 1994 to 2002. He also served as Interim Dean of the Law School from July 1, 2015, to November 1, 2015, while the school searched for a replacement for Michael H. Schill.

Stone is a member of the board of directors of the American Constitution Society, the board of advisors of the American Civil Liberties Union, and the chair of the board of the Chicago Children's Choir. He has served as a vice president of the American Academy of Arts and Sciences and as a member of the executive committee of the Association of American Law Schools. He is a frequent author of op-eds in the Chicago Tribune, The New York Times, The Washington Post, The Wall Street Journal, and the Los Angeles Times, and he writes regularly for the Huffington Post.

== Writing ==
His book Perilous Times: Free Speech in Wartime from the Sedition Act of 1798 to the War on Terrorism (2004), received the Robert F. Kennedy Center for Justice and Human Rights Award for the Human Rights Book of the Year, the Los Angeles Times Book Prize as the Best Book in History, the Kammerer Award for the Best Book of the Year in Political Science from the American Political Science Association, the Goldsmith Award from the Kennedy School of Harvard University for the Best Book of the Year in Public Affairs, and the Scribes Award for the Best Book of the Year in Law.

Other books by Stone include Sex and the Constitution: Sex, Religion, and Law from America's Origins to the Twenty-First Century (2017), Top Secret: When Our Government Keeps Us in the Dark (2007), War and Liberty: An American Dilemma (2007), and Democracy and Equality: The Enduring Constitutional Vision of the Warren Court (2019) (with fellow Chicago professor David A. Strauss).

He is an editor of the Supreme Court Review and he is co-author of "Constitutional Law", "The First Amendment", "The First Amendment in the Modern State", and "The Bill of Rights in Modern Society". He is currently chief editor of a twenty-volume series, Inalienable Rights, which is published by the Oxford University Press. Authors in this series include Richard Posner, Laurence Tribe, Alan Dershowitz, Martha Nussbaum, Mark Tushnet, Jack Rakove, Larry Lessig, Louis Michael Seidman, and Kathleen Sullivan, among others.

Stone has written about the religious affiliations of Supreme Court justices and notably, how this relates to judicial decisions about abortion. He has argued that five sitting Catholic judges effectively prevented the legalization of intact dilation and extraction abortion in Gonzales v. Carhart.

== Controversy ==
In March 2019, Stone drew criticism from some students for his long-standing use of the word nigger in his classroom discussions of the fighting words doctrine, a limitation of the First Amendment's guarantee of freedom of speech.

On March 7, 2019, Stone announced that he no longer intended to use the word in class. Stone remarked, "My conversation with the African-American students convinced me that the hurt and distraction caused by use of the word in the story are real and to be taken seriously. As a teacher, my goal is to be effective and I decided that use of the word in that story isn’t sufficiently important to justify the hurt and distraction it causes. For me, this is a great example of why free speech is important. It enables us to learn from each other." During an interview with David K. Shipler and Daniel Zwerdling on the March 2023 broadcast of Two Reporters, Stone provided many details about how he came to the decision to eliminate use of the word to elicit discussion in class.

== See also ==
- List of law clerks for the third seat of the Supreme Court of the United States
