= University of Chicago Law School =

Private law school in Chicago, Illinois, US

Coordinates: 41°47′09″N 87°35′55″W

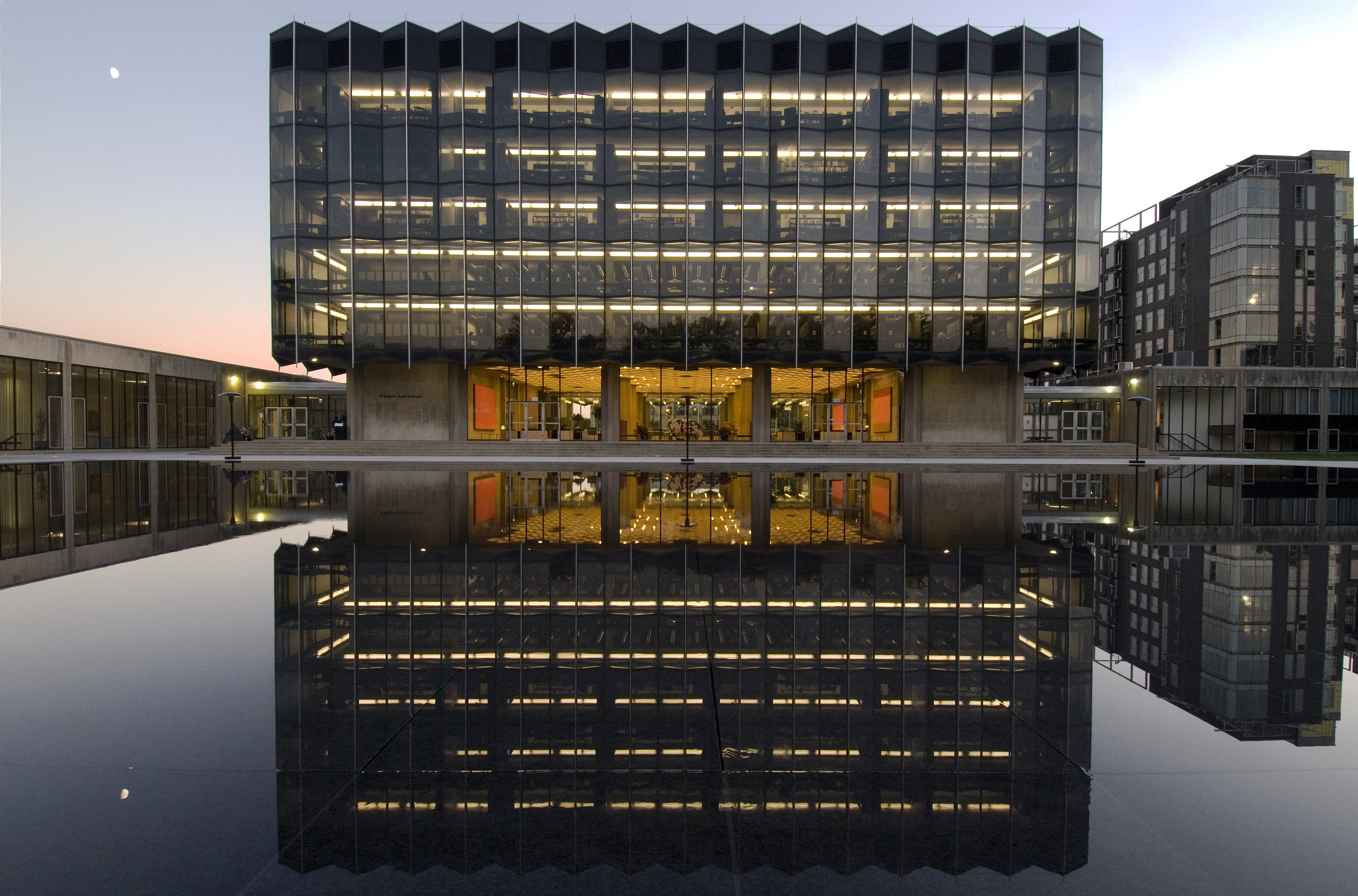
- Parent school: University of Chicago
- Established: 1902; 124 years ago
- School type: Private law school
- Dean: Adam Chilton
- Location: Chicago, Illinois, United States
- Enrollment: 626 (2021)
- Faculty: 183 (2021)
- USNWR ranking: 2nd (2026)
- Bar pass rate: 97.9% (2020)
- Website: law.uchicago.edu
- ABA profile: Standard 509 Report

The University of Chicago Law School is the law school of the University of Chicago, a private research university in Chicago, Illinois, United States. The law school is part of the T14, a classification of consistently high ranking U.S. law schools. It employs more than 180 full-time and part-time faculty and hosts more than 600 students in its Juris Doctor program, while also offering the degree programs in Master of Laws, Master of Studies in Law, and Doctor of Juridical Science.

The law school was originally housed in Stuart Hall, a Gothic-style limestone building on the campus's main quadrangles. Since 1959, it has been housed in an Eero Saarinen-designed building across the Midway Plaisance from the main campus of the University of Chicago. The building was expanded in 1987 and again in 1998. It was renovated in 2008, preserving most of Saarinen's original structure.

Members of the faculty have included Cass Sunstein, Richard Posner, and Richard Epstein, three of the most-cited legal scholars of the 20th and early 21st centuries. Other notable former faculty members include U.S. president Barack Obama and U.S. Supreme Court justices Antonin Scalia, John Paul Stevens, and Elena Kagan.

== History ==
=== Establishment of a new law school in Chicago ===
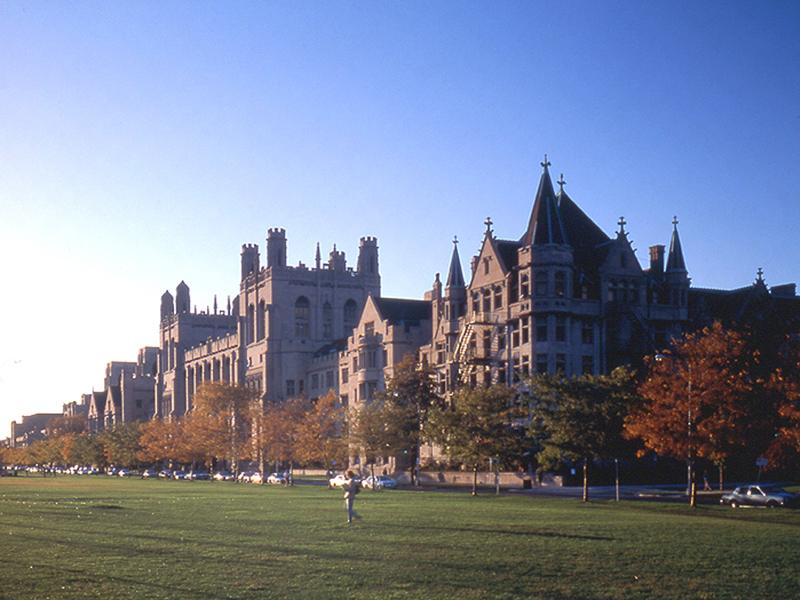
View of the University of Chicago from the Midway Plaisance

When the University of Chicago was founded in 1892, its president William Rainey Harper expressed a desire to establish a law school for the university that would improve democratic government. At the time, Harper observed that, "[t]hus far democracy seems to have found no way of making sure that the strongest men should be placed in control of the country's business." Harper took advice from a number of his contemporaries. One such adviser, a professor at the University of Cambridge, suggested that the object of the new law school should be to train students to become "leaders of the bar and ornaments of the bench, inspiring teachers, scientific writers and wise reformers" and emphasising public law and comparative law. Another adviser, a member of the Chicago bar, suggested that Harvard Law School, led by Christopher Columbus Langdell and influenced by the casebook method at the time, had "lost touch with great leaders among jurists and lawyers" and that the new law school in Chicago should focus on "social economics" or "principles of statesmanship" for lawyers. Noted legal scholar Ernst Freund suggested that the law school promote an interdisciplinary approach to legal education, offering elective courses in subjects such as history and political science. Ultimately, Harper settled with the view that the study of law should not occur in a vacuum, and that it should take into account "the whole field of man as a social being".

In 1901, Harper announced that the new law school would be established the following year. He requested assistance from the faculty of Harvard Law School, whose dean at the time, James Barr Ames, granted professor Joseph Henry Beale a two-year leave of absence to serve as the first dean of the law school in Chicago. He did so on the condition that Chicago "have ideals and methods similar to [those of] the Harvard Law School". However, Ames objected to the proposed curriculum, which contemplated close affiliation with social science departments in the university and subjects that were not found in a traditional first-year law curriculum. He insisted that the faculty comprise "solely of persons who teach law in the strict sense of the word" and using the casebook method. Harper agreed to these terms, and together with Beale assembled the faculty and designed the curriculum. Harper departed from the understanding he had reached with Ames and hired Freund to teach property law, and the law school's curriculum was influenced by Freund's interdisciplinary approach. The founding faculty members were Blewett Harrison Lee and Julian Mack, who had both taught at the law school of Northwestern University; James Parker Hall, who had taught at Stanford Law School and turned down an offer to teach at Harvard Law School; Clarke Butler Whittier, who had also taught at Stanford; Harry A. Bigelow, a notable scholar at Boston University who recognized limitations in the casebook method; and Freund.

=== Founding and early period ===
On October 1, 1902, the law school opened for classes in the University Press Building (currently the Bookstore Building). John D. Rockefeller paid the $250,000 construction cost, and President Theodore Roosevelt laid its cornerstone. At the time of its opening, the law school consisted of 78 students (76 men and two women). It offered courses in contract law, torts, criminal law, property law, agency, and pleading, with electives in administrative law, corporations law, federal jurisdiction, Roman law, international law, and legal ethics. The law school invented the J.D. degree, and was just one of five law schools in the U.S. that required a college degree from its applicants as a prerequisite to admission. Its library, which was established in short order, housed some 18,000 volumes of law reports. In 1903, a year after the law school opened, enrollment at the law school grew rapidly as its student body increased to 126. Floyd R. Mechem, a professor at the University of Michigan Law School and pioneer in empirical legal studies at the time, joined the faculty and remained at the law school for 25 years until his death in 1928.

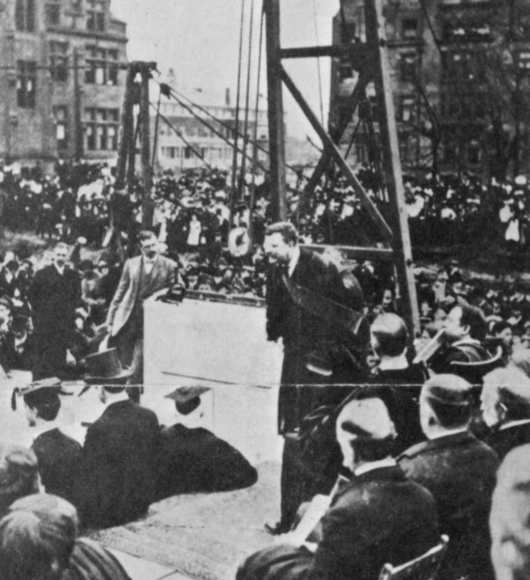
President Theodore Roosevelt laying the cornerstone for the law school on April 2, 1903, after receiving the honorary degree of Doctor of Laws

The law school prospered in its early years and fostered relationships with scholars in other fields, including economics, political science, psychology, and history. It also developed ties with members of the Chicago bar, who served as part-time faculty members and taught legal procedure and other practical courses. The law school's academic standards were recognized as at least equal to those of Harvard. In 1904, the law school moved to Stuart Hall on the main university campus. In the same year, Sophonisba Breckinridge became the first woman to graduate from the law school––a feat that had not yet been achieved at Yale Law School, Columbia Law School or Harvard. In her autobiography, Breckinridge noted that "the fact that the law school, like the rest of the University ... accepted men and women students on equal terms was publicly settled". The law school also established its first alumni association in this period.

The law school faced considerable change in the years leading up to World War I and shortly thereafter. Beale returned to Harvard after his two-year leave of absence. In 1909, the eminent jurist Roscoe Pound taught at the law school for a year. The law school established a chapter of the Order of the Coif in 1911 and the Edward W. Hinton Moot Court program in 1914. During World War I, enrollment declined: in Spring 1917, 241 students were enrolled; this number dropped to 46 by Fall 1918.

In 1918, Nelson Morton Willis became the first African American to earn a law degree from the law school, a Bachelor of Laws (LLB) degree. In 1920, Earl B. Dickerson became the first African-American to graduate from the law school with a Juris Doctor degree. The law school's Black Law Students Association is named in Dickerson's honor. Also in 1920, Violette Neatley Anderson became the first African-American woman to graduate from the law school when she earned a Bachelor of Laws (LLB) degree, and she became the first African-American woman to graduate from any law school in the state of Illinois.

Following the war, in 1926, enrollment reached 500 students for the first time. In 1927, the law school began to offer its first seminars. Its longest-serving dean, James Parker Hall, who played a significant role in recruiting numerous distinguished faculty members to the law school, died in office in 1928.

=== Growth in interdisciplinary approach and the leadership of Edward Levi ===
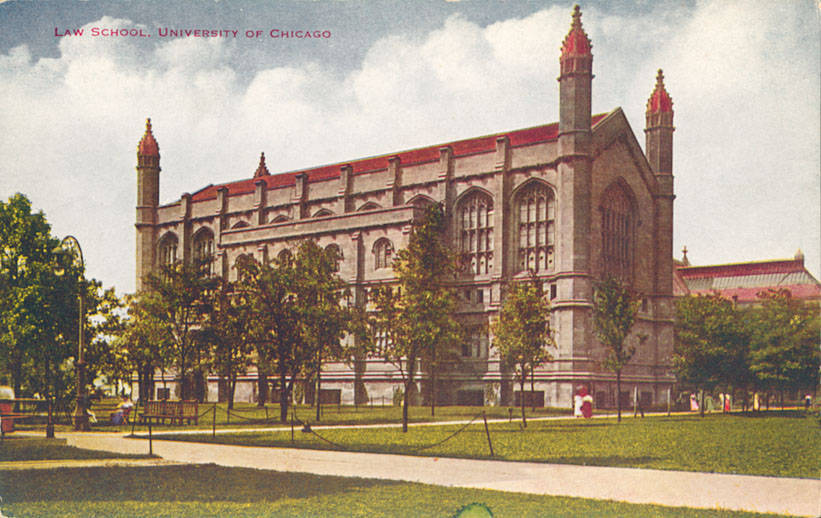
The law school, depicted on a postcard from the 1910s

In the 1930s, new dean Harry A. Bigelow built on the interdisciplinary foundations laid by Freund and introduced classes in accounting, economics, and psychology. The law school's curriculum was shaped by the emerging influence of the law and economics movement. Aaron Director and Henry Simons began offering economics courses in 1933. Faculty member Edward Levi also introduced economics in the antitrust course, permitting Director to teach one of every five classroom sessions. The first volume of the University of Chicago Law Review was also published in 1933. The law school established a legal writing program in 1938 and the Law and Economics Program in 1939. The LL.M. program was established in 1942, while Harry A. Bigelow Teaching Fellowships were established in 1947. As was the case during World War I, enrollment at the law school, like at many of the other top law schools in the country, declined and its academic calendar was adjusted to meet military needs.

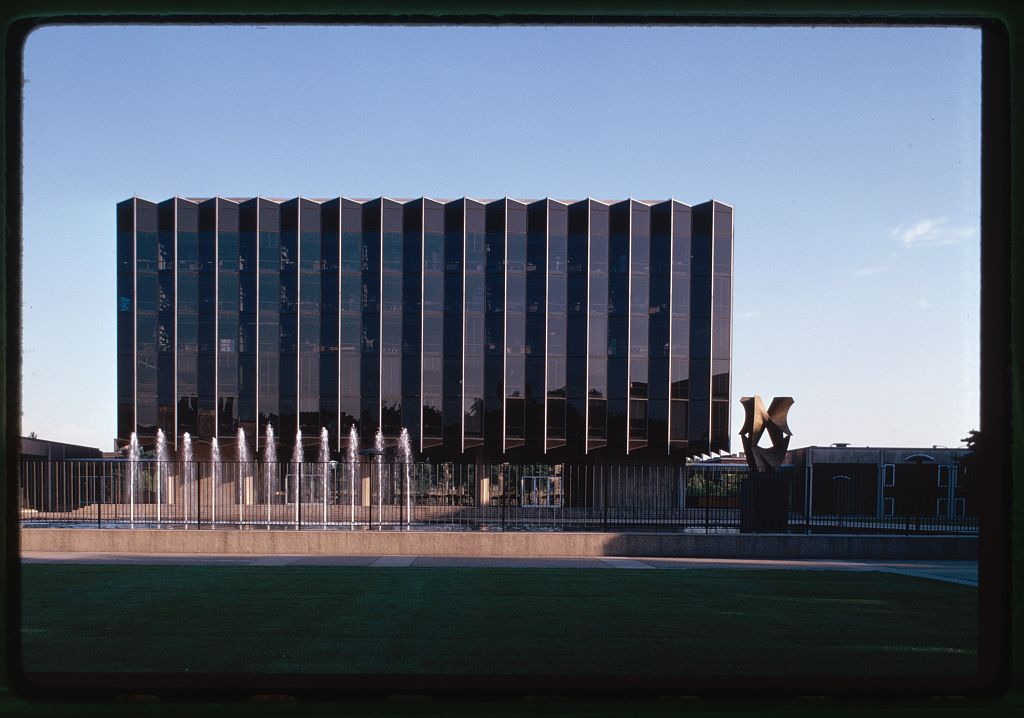
Law School building (1955–1963)

In the 1950s and 1960s, the law school experienced a period of profound growth and expansion under the leadership of Edward Levi, who was appointed Dean in 1950. In 1951, Karl Llewellyn and Soia Mentschikoff joined the law school, the latter being the first woman on the faculty. Other notable scholars, widely regarded as institutional figures and leading thinkers in their respective areas, were Walter J. Blum and Bernard D. Meltzer, who studied and taught at the law school for their entire academic careers. Between 1953 and 1955, Supreme Court justice John Paul Stevens taught antitrust at the law school. In 1958, Director founded the Journal of Law and Economics. In 1959, the law school moved to its current building on 60th Street, designed by Eero Saarinen. In 1960, constitutional law scholar Philip Kurland founded the Supreme Court Review. Levi later served as the provost (1962–1968) and the president (1968–1975) of the University of Chicago, before becoming the United States Attorney General under president Gerald Ford. During his time at the law school, Levi also supported the Committee on Social Thought graduate program.

=== Late 20th century ===
By the 1970s and 1980s, the law and economics movement had attracted a series of scholars with strong connections to the social sciences, such as Nobel laureates Ronald Coase and Gary Becker and scholars Richard A. Posner and William M. Landes. In 1972, Posner founded the Journal of Legal Studies. The law school also established joint degree programs with the Committee on Public Policy Studies and the Department of Economics, complementing Max Rheinstein's Foreign Law Program, which was established in the 1950s with a bequest from the Ford Foundation. The Legal History Program was established in 1981. In 1982, the Federalist Society was established by a group of students at the law school, together with students from Harvard Law School and Yale Law School. In 1989, the D'Angelo Law Library exceeded 500,000 volumes.

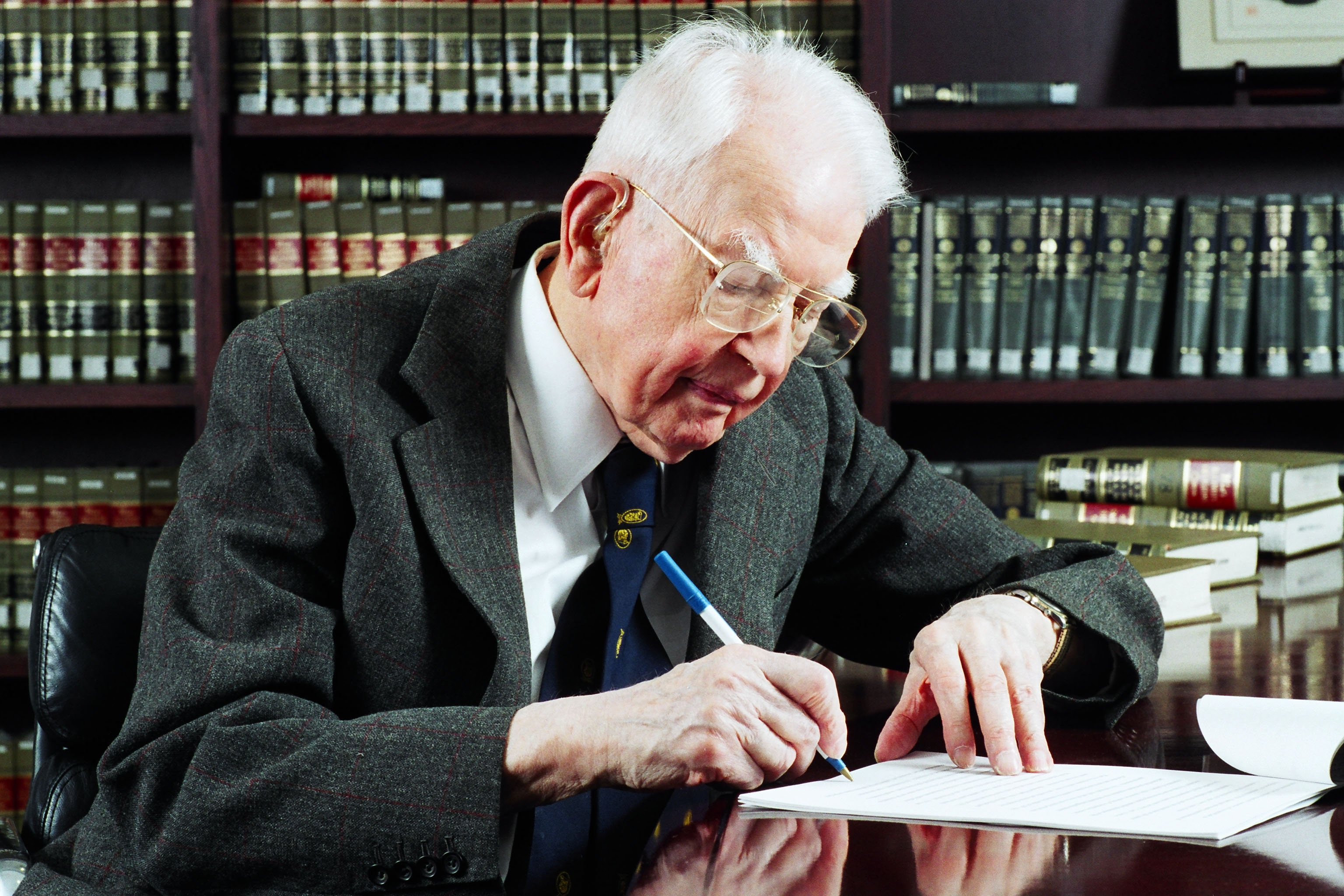
Nobel laureate Ronald Coase taught at the law school from 1964 to 2013

In the same period, many scholars who would later become leaders in their field joined the law school faculty at an early stage in their careers. Richard A. Epstein, identified in a Legal Affairs poll as one of the most influential legal thinkers of modern times, joined the faculty in 1973 and continues to serve as emeritus professor and senior lecturer. Geoffrey R. Stone, a leading First Amendment scholar and alumnus and former dean of the law school, joined the faculty in the same year. Douglas G. Baird, a luminary in bankruptcy law, has been on the faculty since 1980 and served as dean between 1994 and 1999. Cass Sunstein, regarded as "the most cited legal scholar in the United States and probably the world", began his teaching career at the law school in 1981 and served as a faculty member for 27 years. Former U.S. Supreme Court justice Antonin Scalia served as a professor between 1977 and 1982. His future colleague on the Supreme Court, Elena Kagan, began her career at the law school too, as did noted legal scholars Lawrence Lessig and Adrian Vermeule. The 44th president of the U.S. Barack Obama taught at the law school between 1992 and 2004 in the areas of constitutional law, racism and the law, and voting rights before he was elected to the U.S. Senate.

== Academics ==
The law school currently employs more than 200 full-time and part-time faculty members and enrolls approximately 600 students in its Juris Doctor (J.D.) program. It also offers advanced legal degrees such as the Master of Laws (LL.M.) (or alternatively the M.C.L.), the Master of Legal Studies (M.L.S.) and the Doctor of Jurisprudence (J.S.D.). The J.D. degree may be combined with a Master of Business Administration (M.B.A.) or Doctor of Philosophy (Ph.D.) with the University of Chicago Booth School of Business, a Master of Arts (A.M.) in international relations, a Master of Public Policy (M.P.P.) with the University of Chicago Harris School of Public Policy, or a Master of Divinity (M.Div.) with the University of Chicago Divinity School.

The law school's professors use the Socratic Method to facilitate learning in lectures and seminars. This method includes calling on students without prior notice, presenting hypotheticals, and continuously questioning them to test their knowledge and application of the material and to flesh out underlying assumptions in their responses. It is one of the few law schools in the United States that employs this mode of teaching, which is assisted by its low student-to-professor ratio.

=== Clinics ===
The law school offers seven legal clinics, in which students earn course credit while practicing law under the direction of the clinic's independent faculty:

- Edwin F. Mandel Legal Aid Clinic, including:
  - Abrams Environmental Law Clinic
  - Civil Rights and Police Accountability Project
  - Criminal and Juvenile Justice Project Clinic
  - Employment Law Clinic
  - Federal Criminal Justice Clinic
  - Housing Initiative Transactional Clinic
  - Immigrants’ Rights Clinic
  - Global Human Rights Clinic
- Exoneration Project Clinic
- Innovation Clinic
- Institute for Justice Clinic on Entrepreneurship
- Jenner & Block Supreme Court and Appellate Clinic
- Kirkland & Ellis Corporate Lab Clinic

=== Academic centers ===
The law school has six research centers and projects. Each center hosts events, activities, and guest speakers throughout the academic year. They are as follows:

- Coase-Sandor Institute for Law and Economics
- Constitutional Law Institute
- Malyi Center for the Study of Institutional and Legal Integrity
- Center for Comparative Constitutionalism
- Center for Law, Philosophy, and Human Values
- Center on Law and Finance

=== Policy initiatives ===
The law school has five current and past policy initiatives:

- Animal Law Policy Initiative (2004–2007)
- Court Reform in the Juvenile Justice System
- Federal Tax Conference
- Foster Care to Adulthood (2005–2008)
- International Best Standards for Guest Worker Programs (2015–2017)
- Kanter Project on Mass Incarceration (2013)
- Court Reform in the Juvenile Justice System
- International Best Standards for Guest Worker Programs (2015–2017)
- Bilateral Labor Agreements Dataset
- Animal Law Policy Initiative (concluded)
- Foster Care to Adulthood (2005–2008)
- Kanter Project on Mass Incarceration (2013)

=== Programs ===
- Legal History Program
- The John M. Olin Program in Law and Economics
- International and Comparative Law
- Law and Philosophy

=== Admissions and costs ===
In 2021, the law school enrolled 175 students from an applicant pool of 6,514. Overall, the acceptance rate was 11.91% For the entering class of 2024, the 25th and 75th LSAT percentiles were 169 and 175, respectively, with a median of 172. The 25th and 75th undergraduate GPA percentiles were 3.82 and 3.98, respectively, with a median of 3.91.

In 2020, the law school reported that it had received approximately 1,000 applications for 80 positions.

The total cost of attendance (indicating the cost of tuition, fees and living expenses) at the law school for the 2017–18 academic year was $93,414.

=== Grading ===
The law school employs a grading system that places students on a scale of 155–186. The scale was 55–86 prior to 2003, but since then the law school has used a prefix of "1" to eliminate confusion with the traditional 100 point grading scale. For classes of more than 10 students, professors are required to set the median grade at 177, with the number of grades above 180 approximately equaling the number of grades below a 173.

In an article published in The New York Times in 2010, business writer Catherine Rampell criticized other schools' problems with grade inflation, but commended Chicago's system, saying that Chicago "has managed to maintain the integrity of its grades."

Students graduate "with honors" by attaining a final average of 179, "with high honors" upon attaining a final average of 180.5, and "with highest honors" upon attaining a final average of 182. The last of these achievements is rare; typically only one student every few years will attain the requisite 182 average. Additionally, the law school awards two honors at graduation that are based on class rank. Of the students who earned at the law school at least 79 of the 105 credits required to graduate, the top 10% are elected to the Order of the Coif. Students finishing their first or second years in the top 5% of their class, or graduating in the top 10%, are honored as "Kirkland and Ellis Scholars."

=== Publications ===
The law school produces seven professional journals.

Four of those journals are student-run:

- The University of Chicago Law Review (among the top five most cited law reviews in the world)
- the Chicago Journal of International Law,
- The University of Chicago Legal Forum, and
- The University of Chicago Business Law Review.

The other three are overseen by faculty:

- The Supreme Court Review,
- The Journal of Law and Economics, and
- The Journal of Legal Studies.

The law school produces several series of academic papers, including the Kreisman Working Papers Series in Housing Law and Policy, the Coase-Sandor Working Paper Series in Law and Economics, the Fulton Lectures, and the Public Law and Legal Theory Working Papers, in addition to a series of occasional papers.

=== Student groups ===
There are approximately 60 student-run groups at the law school which fall under the umbrella of the Law Students Association. It is home to one of the three founding chapters of the Federalist Society. As a professor, former Supreme Court justice Antonin Scalia helped to organize the Chicago chapter of the society. Chicago is also home to a large chapter of the progressive American Constitution Society for Law and Policy.

== Reception ==
=== Outcomes and career prospects ===
In 2018, the law school was ranked first in the U.S. for overall employment outcomes by the National Law Journal and second in the U.S. for best career prospects by Forbes. According to the law school's official 2020 ABA-required disclosures, 98.5% of the Class of 2019 obtained full-time, long-term, JD-required employment within ten months of graduation. The median salary for its graduates in the Class of 2019 was $190,000, and 75% of graduates earned starting salaries of $190,000 or greater upon graduation. For the same cohort, 50.2% of graduates secured positions at law firms with more than 500 lawyers. The law school is ranked first in the U.S. by the National Law Journal for placing the highest percentage of recent graduates in law firms of 100 or more lawyers. It also had the highest first-time Bar pass rate (98.9%) of all law schools in the United States.

=== Judicial clerkships ===
In 2023, University of Chicago Law School alumni comprised the third-highest percentage of recent graduates clerking for federal judges, after Stanford Law School and Yale Law School. Data compiled from the previous 12 years by Brad Hillis in 2017 indicates that the law school has the third-highest gross and third-highest per capita placement of alumni in Supreme Court of the United States clerkships among all law schools since 1882. Between 1992 and 2017, it placed 88 alumni in Supreme Court of the United States clerkships. During the 2021–2022 term alone, nine different Chicago alumni clerked for nine different justices on the Supreme Court of the United States. In the Class of 2019, 27.6% of its graduates secured clerkships (with 87.3% of those graduates in federal clerkships).

=== Rankings ===
The law school is included in the T14, a classification of consistently high ranking U.S. law schools. Recent rankings include:

- Third of all law schools in the world (third in the U.S.) by the Academic Ranking of World Universities in 2020
- Fourth in the world (second in the U.S.) by the Times Higher Education World University Rankings in 2021
- First in the U.S. by Above the Law in 2021 and second by Business Insider
- Second in the U.S. by U.S. News & World Report in 2026
- Second in the U.S. in terms of scholarly impact in a 2021 study by Gregory Sisk et al. in 2021
- Second in the U.S. for best career prospects by Forbes in 2017
- Third in the U.S. for highest-earning graduates by Forbes in 2021
- First in the U.S. for best professors and best for federal clerkships by the Princeton Review in 2023
- Third in the U.S. for best classroom experience by the Princeton Review in 2023

== Campus ==
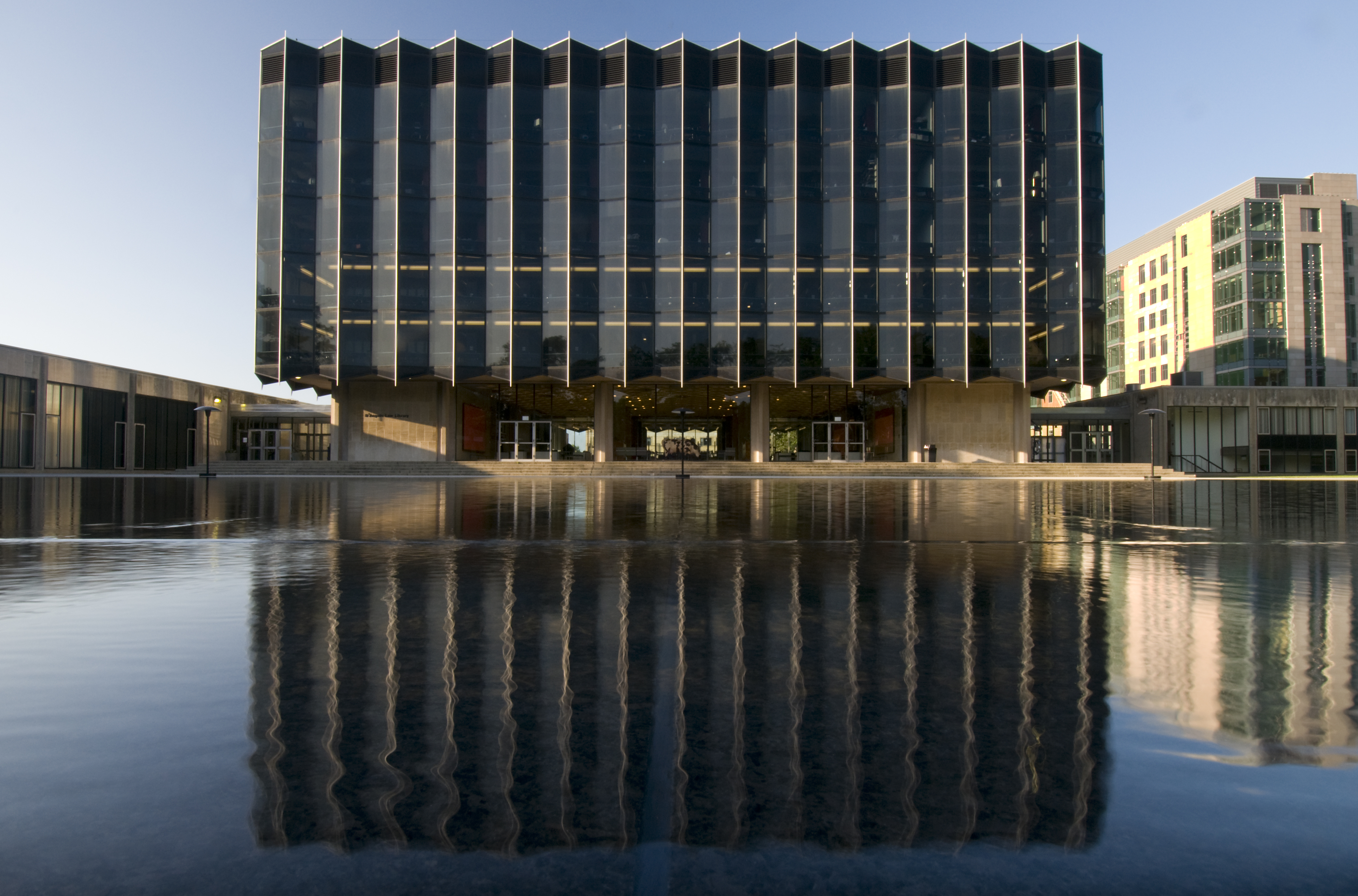
The Laird Bell Quadrangle. Eero Saarinen designed the present law school building, opened 1959.

The law school was originally housed in Stuart Hall, a Gothic-style limestone building on the campus's main quadrangles. Needing more library and student space, the law school moved across the Midway Plaisance to its current, Eero Saarinen-designed building (next to what was then the headquarters of the American Bar Association) in October 1959. The building contains classrooms, the D'Angelo Law Library, faculty offices, and an auditorium and courtroom, arranged in a quadrangle around a fountain (mimicking the college Gothic architecture of the campus's main quadrangles). The year saw a number of celebrations of the law school's new home, including a filming of The Today Show and appearances by Chief Justice Earl Warren, Governor (and later Vice President) Nelson Rockefeller and Secretary-General of the United Nations Dag Hammarskjöld.

In 1987, and over the objections of the Saarinen family, the building was expanded to add office and library space (and the library renamed in honor of alumnus Dino D'Angelo). In 1998, a dedicated space for the law school's clinics, the Arthur Kane Center for Clinical Legal Education, as well as numerous additional classrooms, were constructed. Renovation of the library, classrooms, offices, and fountain was completed in 2008, notable for the preservation of most of Saarinen's structure at a time when many modernist buildings faced demolition.

=== D'Angelo Law Library ===
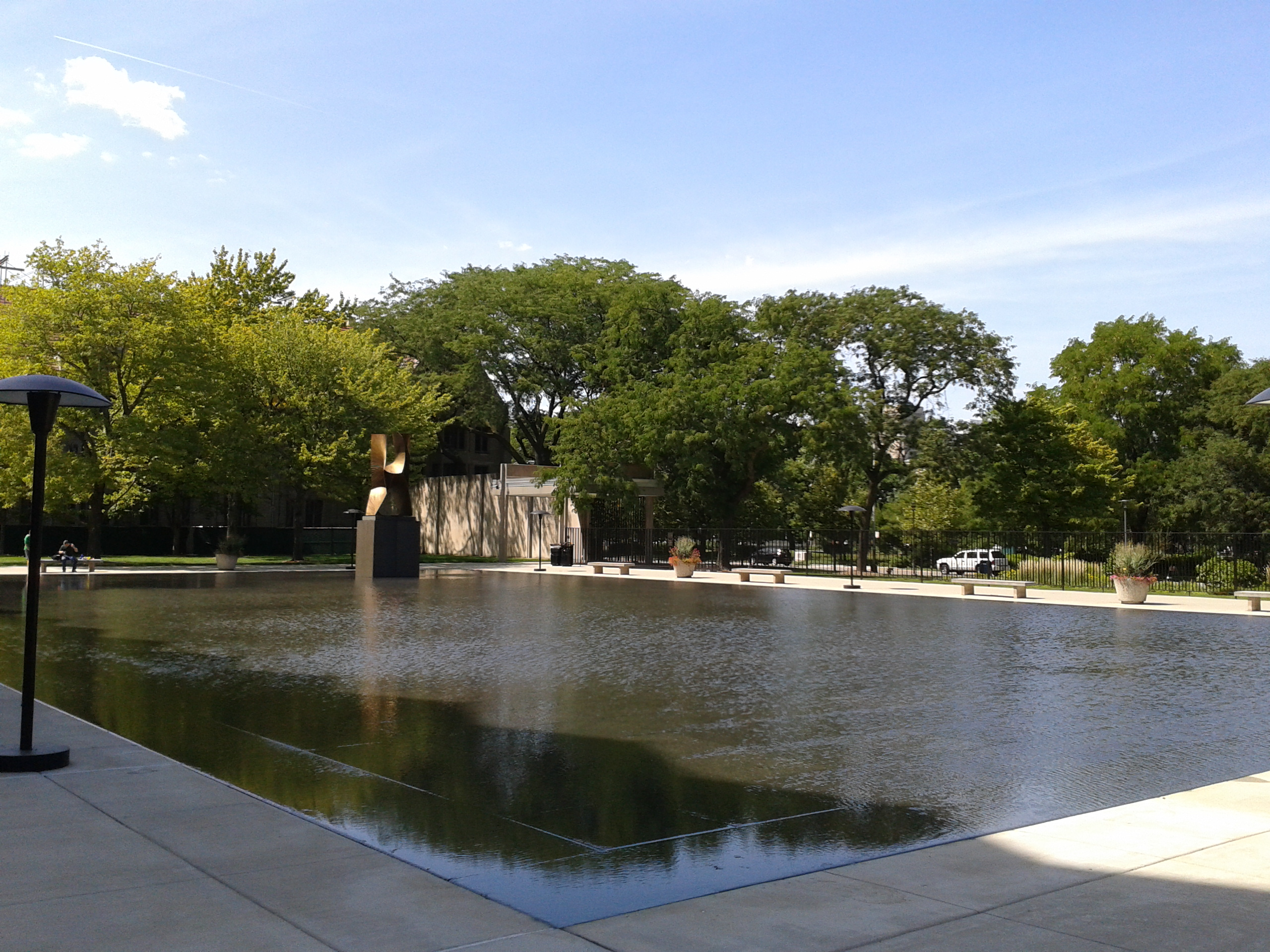
Laird Bell Quadrangle fountain in front of the D'Angelo Law Library

The D'Angelo Law Library is part of the University of Chicago Library system. Renovated in 2006, it features a second-story reading room. The Law Library is open 90 hours per week and employs 11 full-time librarians and 11 additional managers and staff members. It has study space for approximately 500 people, a wireless network and 26 networked computers. It contains over 700,000 volumes of books, with approximately 6,000 added each year, including materials in over 25 languages, and primary law from foreign countries and international organizations.

== People ==
=== List of deans ===
No.	Name	From	To
1	Joseph Henry Beale	1902	1904
2	James Parker Hall	1904	1928
3	Harry A. Bigelow	1929	1933
4	Wilber G. Katz	1939	1950
5	Edward H. Levi	1950	1962
6	Phil C. Neal	1963	1975
7	Norval Morris	1975	1979
8	Gerhard Casper	1979	1987
9	Geoffrey R. Stone	1987	1994
10	Douglas Baird	1994	1999
11	Daniel Fischel	1999	2001
12	Saul Levmore	2001	2009
13	Michael H. Schill	2010	2015
14	Thomas J. Miles	2015	2025
15	Adam Chilton	2025	present

(Source)

=== Notable faculty ===
The law school's faculty has included the 44th U.S. President Barack Obama, Supreme Court justices Antonin Scalia, John Paul Stevens and Elena Kagan, leaders of the legal realism movement Karl Llewellyn and Herman Oliphant, tax law doyen Walter J. Blum, leading constitutional law scholars Harry Kalven and Michael W. McConnell, founder of the law and literature movement James Boyd White, and one of the most widely-cited legal scholars in the world, Cass Sunstein. Its current faculty includes Kyoto Prize winner Martha Nussbaum, distinguished legal philosopher Brian Leiter, First Amendment scholar Geoffrey R. Stone, federal appellate judges Frank H. Easterbrook and Diane P. Wood, bankruptcy expert Douglas Baird, prominent legal historian Richard H. Helmholz, and among the most widely-cited legal scholars of the 20th and 21st centuries Richard A. Posner, Richard A. Epstein and Eric Posner.

==== Current ====
- Douglas Baird: scholar on bankruptcy law and contracts
- William Baude: scholar on constitutional law and interpretation
- Omri Ben-Shahar: contracts and consumer protection scholar
- Lisa Bernstein: contracts and commercial law scholar
- Curtis Bradley: international law and foreign relations scholar
- Emily Buss: scholar on children and parents' rights
- Anthony J. Casey (alumnus): scholar on business law, finance, and bankruptcy
- Adam Chilton: scholar in empirical legal studies.
- Frank H. Easterbrook (alumnus): United States circuit judge of the United States Court of Appeals for the Seventh Circuit and leading antitrust scholar
- Richard A. Epstein (emeritus): scholar on classical liberalism, libertarianism, torts, Roman Law, contract and law and economics
- Daniel Fischel (emeritus, alumnus): law and economics scholar, and chairman and president of Compass Lexecon
- Tom Ginsburg: scholar on international and comparative law
- Richard H. Helmholz: legal historian and expert on European legal history
- M. Todd Henderson (alumnus): scholar on corporations law and securities regulation
- William H. J. Hubbard (alumnus): civil procedure and law and economics scholar
- Aziz Huq: scholar on constitutional law, federal courts, and criminal procedure
- Dennis J. Hutchinson (alumnus): constitutional law scholar and former editor of the Supreme Court Review
- Alison LaCroix: legal historian and constitutional law scholar
- William Landes: economist and law and economics scholar
- Brian Leiter: legal philosopher and scholar on Nietzsche
- Saul Levmore: former dean of the law school and scholar on commercial law and public choice
- Jonathan Masur: behavioral law and economics, patent law, and administrative law scholar
- Thomas J. Miles: law and economics scholar
- Jennifer Nou: scholar on administrative law and regulatory policy
- Martha Nussbaum: influential philosopher and expert on ancient Greek and Roman philosophy, political philosophy, feminism, and ethics
- Randal C. Picker (alumnus): scholar on antitrust and intellectual property law
- Eric Posner: scholar on international law and contract law, and one of the most cited law professors in the U.S.
- Richard A. Posner: former federal appellate judge and the most cited legal scholar of the 20th century.
- John Rappaport: criminal procedure and criminal law scholar
- Gerald N. Rosenberg: leading scholar on political science and law, and author of The Hollow Hope (1991)
- Andrew M. Rosenfield (alumnus): economist, CEO and managing partner of TGG Group, and managing partner of Guggenheim Partners
- Alison Siegler: criminal law scholar and director of the Federal Criminal Justice Clinic
- Geoffrey R. Stone (alumnus): leading scholar on constitutional law and the First Amendment
- Lior Strahilevitz: property law and privacy law scholar
- David A. Strauss: constitutional law scholar
- Diane P. Wood: Chief United States circuit judge of the United States Court of Appeals for the Seventh Circuit

==== Former ====
- Daniel Abebe
- Mortimer J. Adler
- Amabel Anderson Arnold
- Paul M. Bator
- Harry A. Bigelow
- Walter J. Blum (alumnus)
- Lea Brilmayer
- Gerhard Casper
- Ronald Coase: winner of the Nobel Memorial Prize in Economic Sciences
- William Crosskey
- Brainerd Currie
- David P. Currie
- Kenneth W. Dam
- Kenneth Culp Davis
- Dhammika Dharmapala: economist and tax scholar
- Aaron Director
- Justin Driver
- Ulrich Drobnig
- Owen M. Fiss
- Ernst Freund
- Elizabeth Garrett
- Grant Gilmore
- Douglas Ginsburg (alumnus)
- Jack Goldsmith
- Philip Hamburger
- Bernard Harcourt
- Geoffrey C. Hazard Jr.
- Edward W. Hinton (after whom the Hinton Moot Court Competition is named)
- James F. Holderman
- Elena Kagan: justice of the Supreme Court of the United States
- Dan Kahan
- Harry Kalven (alumnus)
- Stanley Nider Katz
- Nicholas Katzenbach: former attorney general of the United States
- Friedrich Kessler
- Spencer L. Kimball
- Larry Kramer (alumnus)
- Anthony Kronman
- Philip Kurland
- John H. Langbein
- Douglas Laycock (alumnus)
- Lawrence Lessig
- Karl Llewellyn
- Edward Levi: former attorney general of the United States (alumnus)
- Jonathan R. Macey
- Julian Mack
- Michael W. McConnell (alumnus)
- Tracey Meares (alumna)
- Bernard D. Meltzer (alumnus)
- Soia Mentschikoff
- Abner Mikva (alumnus)
- William R. Ming (alumnus)
- Norval Morris
- Edward R. Morrison (alumnus)
- Dallin H. Oaks (alumnus)
- Barack Obama (1992–2004): former president of the United States
- Herman Oliphant (alumnus)
- Douglas H. Parker
- Eduardo Peñalver
- Roscoe Pound
- John Mark Ramseyer
- Max Rheinstein
- Antonin Scalia: former justice of the Supreme Court of the United States
- Michael H. Schill
- Stephen Schulhofer
- Richard Scott, Baron Scott of Foscote: former Lord of Appeal
- Henry Simons
- A. W. B. Simpson
- Anne-Marie Slaughter
- John Paul Stevens: former justice of the Supreme Court of the United States
- Cass Sunstein
- Jacobus tenBroek
- Adrian Vermeule
- James Boyd White
- Hans Zeisel

=== Notable alumni ===
The law school has produced many distinguished alumni in the judiciary, government and politics, academia, business, and other fields. Its alumni include heads of state and politicians around the world, the Lord Chief Justice of England and Wales, the president of the Supreme Court of Israel, judges of United States Courts of Appeals, several U.S. attorneys general and solicitors general, members of Congress and cabinet officials, privy counsellors, university presidents and faculty deans, founders of the law firms Kirkland & Ellis, Baker McKenzie, and Jenner & Block, CEOs and chairpersons of multinational corporations, and contributors to literature, journalism, and the arts. The law school counts among its alumni recipients of the Presidential Medal of Freedom, Fulbright Scholars, Rhodes Scholars, Marshall Scholars, Commonwealth Fellows, National Humanities Medallists, and Pulitzer Prize winners.

In the judiciary, notable alumni include Lord Thomas, who served as Lord Chief Justice of England and Wales from 2013 to 2017, and former president of the Supreme Court of Israel, Shimon Agranat. Federal appellate judges who graduated from the law school include Douglas H. Ginsburg, David S. Tatel, Michael W. McConnell and Robert Bork, who was unsuccessfully nominated to the U.S. Supreme Court. Other federal appellate judges include Abner Mikva, who later served as White House Counsel in the Clinton administration; Frank H. Easterbrook, who currently teaches at the law school; and Jerome Frank, who served as Chairman of the Securities and Exchange Commission and, together with fellow alumnus Herman Oliphant, played a leading role in the legal realism movement in the U.S. More recently confirmed alumni federal appellate judges include Anthony Johnstone, Eric E. Murphy, Neomi Rao, Beth Robinson, Eric D. Miller, and Allison H. Eid.

Notable alumni in government and politics include Attorneys General John Ashcroft, Ramsey Clark and Edward H. Levi, who was Dean of the law school from 1950 to 1962. The last Solicitor General of the United States, Noel Francisco, graduated from the law school in 1996. Other graduates include the former prime minister of New Zealand, Geoffrey Palmer; prosecutor at the Nuremberg trials and drafter of the U.N. Charter, Bernard D. Meltzer; former FBI director, James Comey; former United States Secretary of the Interior and key figure in the implementation of the New Deal, Harold L. Ickes; former Secretary of Health, Education, and Welfare, Abraham Ribicoff; the first director of the Consumer Financial Protection Bureau, Richard Cordray; current White House Counsel Ed Siskel; current CDC official Nirav D. Shah; current U.S. senator Amy Klobuchar, and U.S. Representative and United States House Select Committee on the January 6 Attack Vice-Chair Liz Cheney, among other members of Congress.

Alumni who are leaders in higher education include the current president of Princeton University, Christopher L. Eisgruber; the current dean of the University of Texas School of Law, Ward Farnsworth; the former dean of Stanford Law School and President of the London School of Economics, Larry Kramer; the co-chair of the COVID-19 Advisory Board, head of Operation Warp Speed, and former dean of the Yale School of Medicine, David A. Kessler; the former dean of Cornell Law School, Roger C. Cramton; and the former dean of Vanderbilt University Law School, Tulane University Law School and Cornell Law School, William Ray Forrester. Scholars who graduated from the law school include Harvard Law School professor Mary Ann Glendon, who is a former U.S. ambassador to the Holy See; First Amendment scholar Geoffrey R. Stone; tax law doyen Walter J. Blum; and one of the pre-eminent constitutional law scholars of the 20th century, Harry Kalven.

In business, notable alumni include the billionaire and founder of the Carlyle Group, David Rubenstein; the former CEO and president of Bloomberg L.P. and the current CEO of Sidewalk Labs, Daniel L. Doctoroff; the executive chairman of Hyatt Hotels Corporation, Thomas Pritzker; the chairman and president of Compass Lexecon and an emeritus professor at the law school, Daniel Fischel; former president of Weyerhaeuser and of Boy Scouts of America, Norton Clapp; the current commissioner of the NBA, Adam Silver; the founder of Yammer, David O. Sacks; and Katherine L. Adams, the general counsel of Apple Inc.. In the field of non-governmental organizations, alumni include the founder and CEO of the International Justice Mission, Gary Haugen; and co-founder of Amnesty International, Luis Kutner.

The law school also counts among its alumni four recipients of the Presidential Medal of Freedom; two Pulitzer Prize winners; the first female African-American U.S. senator, Carol Moseley Braun; the first African-American to serve as a United States federal judge, James Benton Parsons; civil rights attorney and chairman of the Fair Employment Practices Committee, Earl B. Dickerson; the first female president of the American Law Institute and of the American Bar Association, Roberta Cooper Ramo; Pulitzer Prize-winner Studs Terkel; civil rights activist and the first woman to graduate from the law school, Sophonisba Breckinridge; and the founder of the intelligent design movement, Phillip E. Johnson.
