= William Landes =

American economist (born 1939)

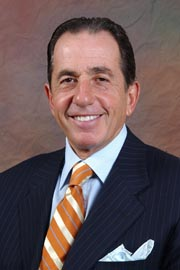
- Born: c. 1939 (age 86–87)

Academic background
- Education: Columbia University (BA, PhD)

Academic work
- Discipline: Law and economics
- School or tradition: Chicago School of Economics
- Institutions: University of Chicago Law School
- Website: Information at IDEAS / RePEc

William M. Landes (born c. 1939) is an American economist who has written about the economic analysis of law and an emeritus professor at the University of Chicago Law School. He is a fellow of the American Academy of Arts and Sciences, which cited him for his work in the field. He is among the most cited law professors in American law reviews. Landes also is the original founder (with Richard Posner and Andrew Rosenfield) of Lexecon (now Compass Lexecon), a legal and economic consulting firm.

Landes received his B.A. from Columbia College and his PhD in economics from Columbia University. He taught in the Economics Departments of Stanford University, Columbia University, the Graduate Center of the City University of New York and The University of Chicago before joining the faculty of the University of Chicago Law School.

Landes is also a board member of the Smart Museum of Art, which is located in the University of Chicago's Hyde Park Campus. The Elisabeth & William M. Landes Gallery within the Smart Museum of Art features works created between the 1880s and the late 1950s.

Landes is a significant collector of art from the post-World War II period, particularly mid-century New York modern artists and social realism. His collection also includes significant works by notable gay and politically left-leaning artists. He has said that he does not collect them to achieve parity or make a political statement, but because the works are "representational, and excellent."

== Selected bibliography ==
- The Economic Structure of Intellectual Property Law (Harvard Univ. Press 2003) (with Richard A. Posner).
- "The Economics of Legal Disputes Over The Ownership of Works of Art and Other Collectibles, " in Essays in the Economics of the Arts, V. A. Ginsburgh & P.-M. Menger, eds. (Elsevier Science, 1996) (with Richard A. Posner).
- The Economic Structure of Tort Law, (Harvard Univ. Press 1987) (with Richard A. Posner).
- "Causation in Tort Law: An Economic Approach," Journal of Legal Studies (January 1983) (with Richard A. Posner).
- "An Economic Theory of Intentional Torts,"International Review of Law and Economics (December 1981) (with Richard A. Posner).
- "The Positive Economic Theory of Tort Law," Georgia Law Review (Summer 1981) (with Richard A. Posner).
- Essays in the Economics of Crime and Punishment, (National Bureau of Economic Research 1974)(edited with Gary S. Becker).
