= Gerhard Casper =

American academic administrator (born 1937)

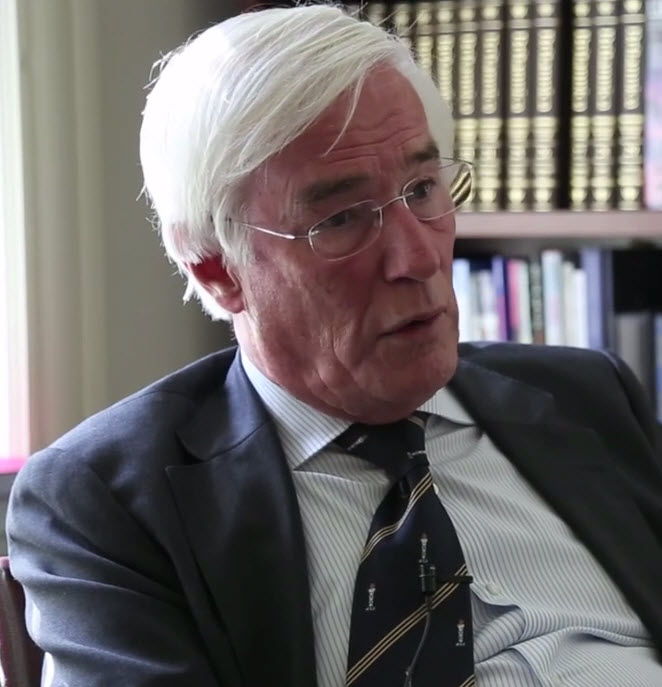

9th President of Stanford University
- In office September 1, 1992 – August 31, 2000
- Preceded by: Donald Kennedy
- Succeeded by: John L. Hennessy

Personal details
- Born: December 25, 1937 (age 88) Hamburg, Germany
- Education: University of Hamburg (LLB); Yale University (LLM); University of Freiburg (PhD)
- Profession: Political Scientist

Gerhard Casper (born December 25, 1937) is an American and German political scientist who served as the eighth dean of the University of Chicago Law School from 1979 to 1987, as the provost of the University of Chicago from 1989 to 1992, and as the ninth president of Stanford University from 1992 to 2000.

Casper is a senior fellow at the Freeman Spogli Institute for International Studies (FSI) at Stanford, and served as the institute's director between September 2012 and June 2013. He was later president of the American Academy in Berlin from July 2015 to July 2016 and as the institution's trustee-in-residence from August 2019 to January 2020. Casper is the Peter and Helen Bing Professor in Undergraduate Education, emeritus, and is a professor with emeritus status at Stanford Law School.

== Biography and academic career ==
Born December 25, 1937, Gerhard Casper grew up in Hamburg, Germany. He earned his first law degree from the University of Hamburg in 1961. In 1962, he received his LL.M. from Yale University. He then attended the University of Freiburg, where he obtained his doctorate in 1964.

In the fall of 1964, Casper emigrated to the United States and spent two years as an assistant professor of political science at the University of California, Berkeley. In 1966, he joined the faculty of the University of Chicago Law School. Between 1979 and 1987, he served as dean of the law school. In 1989, Casper was appointed provost of the University of Chicago and served in that capacity until 1992. He served as president of Stanford University from 1992 to 2000.

Casper has written and taught primarily in the fields of constitutional law, constitutional history, comparative law, and legal theory. Among his books is Separating Power (Harvard University Press, 1997). From 1977 to 1990, he was an editor of The Supreme Court Review.

== Stanford University ==
In 1992, Casper became the ninth president of Stanford University. His concerns as president ranged from resolution of the indirect cost dispute with the federal government to restoration of the campus after the 1989 Loma Prieta earthquake to innovation in curriculum, programs, and physical plant.

Casper's Commission on Undergraduate Education was the first comprehensive examination of undergraduate education at Stanford in 25 years. The commission and other faculty initiatives led to a new approach to the first two years of college, Stanford Introductory Studies (SIS), which provides small-group learning and research experiences. SIS includes the Freshman and Sophomore Introductory Seminars and Sophomore College.

Casper kept tuition increases to a minimum while increasing financial aid.

Casper also initiated the Stanford Graduate Fellowships and helped raise a substantial endowment for their support. The purpose of the Stanford Graduate Fellowships is to attract the best graduate students and give them full freedom to pursue their work at Stanford without worrying about the vagaries of sponsored research or other traditional sources of support.

Recruitment and retention of exceptional faculty members who excel in both research and teaching was emphasized during Casper's presidency through Research Grants for Junior Faculty in the three schools that offer undergraduate degrees: Earth Sciences, Engineering, and Humanities and Sciences. The university's bureaucracy was also streamlined through internal reorganizations and a reduction in the number of vice presidential positions.

The integration of the Stanford Alumni Association into the university in 1998 enhanced outreach to Stanford's alumni worldwide. Donations to Stanford, especially from alumni, increased sharply under Casper's leadership, with particular emphasis on fortifying Stanford's endowment and increasing participation through the creation of the Stanford Fund for Undergraduate Education.

During Casper's presidency, the physical infrastructure of the campus improved substantially. Restoration of buildings damaged in the 1989 Loma Prieta earthquake was completed, and the architectural value of new buildings was enhanced with competitions attracting some of the world's most gifted architects. The 1893 Leland Stanford Junior Museum became part of an expanded complex, the Iris and B. Gerald Cantor Center for Visual Arts. The reconstructed Bing Wing of Cecil H. Green Library opened in 1999, a decade after the severe damage inflicted by the Loma Prieta earthquake closed its doors. Other new constructions included the Science and Engineering Quad, the Center for Clinical Sciences Research, graduate residences, and the Arrillaga Alumni Center.

In 1993, Casper chose Condoleezza Rice as provost of the university. She was succeeded in 1999 by John L. Hennessy. In 2000, Hennessy became the tenth president of the university. About the Stanford presidency, Casper wrote Cares of the University (Stanford, CA, 1997), in which he addressed many issues facing the contemporary university. His most recent book about higher education is The Winds of Freedom: Addressing Challenges to the University, which was published by Yale University Press in 2014.

== American Academy in Berlin ==
In July 2015, Casper was appointed one-year interim president of the American Academy in Berlin, an institute for culture and research founded in 1994 by Ambassador Richard Holbrooke. The independent, privately funded, nonpartisan American Academy in Berlin seeks to improve cultural and academic ties between Germany and the USA. Since August 2019, Casper has served as the American Academy's trustee-in-residence. He returned to the Academy's board in 2015, after having previously served as trustee from 2000 to 2009.

While acting as president, Casper arranged a visit by Nobel Prize winner Eric Kandel, in September 2015, who discussed "The Quest to Understand the Unconscious in Art, Mind, and Brain." Casper also helped to oversee the Richard C. Holbrooke Forum, which was created remembering the Academy's founder.

The intercultural and interdisciplinary setting and the creative program made the Academy a prestigious center according to the German magazine Der Spiegel.

== Honors, awards and leadership ==
Casper has been elected to membership in the American Law Institute, the International Academy of Comparative Law, the American Academy of Arts and Sciences, the Orden Pour le mérite für Wissenschaften und Künste (Order Pour le mérite for the Sciences and Arts), and the American Philosophical Society. During the fall of 2006, he held the Kluge Chair in American Law and Governance at the Library of Congress. He has been awarded various honorary doctorates. On May 26, 2000 Casper received an honorary doctorate from the Faculty of Social Sciences at Uppsala University, Sweden That spring, he also received an honorary doctorate from Yale.

In 1997, Casper received the Golden Plate Award of the American Academy of Achievement.

Casper is the 2014 recipient of the American Law Institute's Distinguished Service Award. He served on ALI's Council from 1980 to 2010, and continues to participate as an emeritus member. From 2000 to 2008, he served as a successor trustee of Yale University. From 2010 to 2016, he was chairman of the Board of the Terra Foundation for American Art. Casper is a trustee of the Central European University in Budapest and a member of international advisory councils at the Israel Democracy Institute, the European University at St. Petersburg, and Koç University, Istanbul.

Casper also has the honor of having been the subject of the first Google search by someone not a part of the Google team. In 1998, the future founders of Google were demonstrating their search software for John Hennessy. He chose to search for "Gerhard Casper".

== Notes ==
Academic offices
Preceded by Donald Kennedy	President of Stanford University; 1992–2000	Succeeded by John L. Hennessy
