= Norval Morris =

Norval Ramsden Morris (1923–2004) was an Australian-educated American law professor, criminologist, and advocate for criminal justice and mental health reform. He served as the 7th dean of the University of Chicago Law School from 1975 to 1979.

Morris was a strong influence on United States law professors and criminologists including James B. Jacobs (NYU), Marc Miller (Arizona), Kevin Reitz (Minnesota), Michael Tonry (Minnesota), Franklin E. Zimring (Berkeley), Albert Alschuler (Northwestern) and Myron Orfield (Minnesota). He was a close friend and colleague of U.S. Supreme Court associate justice Harry A. Blackmun and of federal district court judge Abner Mikva.

Morris was widely regarded as an advocate for the rights of inmates in prisons and mental hospitals. His theories on prison reform were implemented at the Federal Correctional Complex, Butner, N.C.

Morris was a member of the American Academy of Arts and Sciences, a Fellow of the American Bar Foundation, a Fellow of the American Society of Criminology, a board member of the Chicago Bar Foundation (1982–88), a chairman of the board and board member of the National Institute of Corrections.

== Career ==
Norval Morris was born in 1923 in Auckland, New Zealand. He served in the Australian Army in World War II. He earned LL.B. and LL.M. degrees at the University of Melbourne, where he was a resident student at Trinity College from 1940, and gained second-class honours in Introduction to Legal Method and Law of Wrongs (Civil and Criminal) in 1941. He received his PhD in law and criminology in 1949 from the University of London, with his thesis titled, The law and practice relating to habitual criminals, and was appointed to the Faculty of Law at the London School of Economics.

In the 1950s, Morris was chairman of the Commission of Inquiry on Capital Punishment in Ceylon. Drawing on his experiences there, he later wrote The Brothel Boy & Other Parables of the Law (1992) a fictional reconstruction of the experiences of Eric Blair (George Orwell) as a Burmese policeman and magistrate, which Morris used to examine ethical and legal issues.

At the University of Melbourne, Morris was Secretary and the Foundation Member in the Department of Criminology (1951–58), Associate Professor of Criminology (1955–58) and Senior Lecturer in Law (1950–58). He was Dean of the Faculty of Law at the University of Adelaide (1958–62).

In the United States, Morris was a visiting professor at Harvard University, the University of Utah, the University of Colorado and New York University. In 1962-64, he was founding director of the United Nations Institute for the Prevention of Crime and Treatment of Offenders (Asia and the Far East).

In 1964, he became a member of the University of Chicago Law School faculty and from 1975 to 1978 was Dean of the University of Chicago Law School.

He and Omaha lawyer Robert J. Kutak precipitated the creation of the National Institute of Corrections within the U.S. Bureau of Prisons in 1971-1972. Morris served on the institute's board until his death.

In 1978, his stance on the Fourth Amendment and gun control in his 1970 book with Gordon Hawkins ("There can be no right to privacy in regard to armament") cost him an appointment to the federal Law Enforcement Assistance Administration, even though he dismissed the proposals in the book as "Utopian" and "science-fiction".

From 1979 to 1987, Morris served on the Police Board of the City of Chicago. In 1994, Morris took emeritus status at Chicago Law School, working as a consultant and advisor until his death in 2004 at the age of eighty. He was survived by a wife, three sons and three grandchildren.

Underscoring Morris' lasting legacy in the field of legal and criminological research, his work has been recently cited by the Supreme Court in Davis v. Ayala (Kennedy J, concurring), Docket No. 13-428 (decided June 18, 2015).

== Writings ==
Morris was the author, co-author or editor of at least 15 books and hundreds of articles during his 55-year academic career, including:

- Norval Morris, Maconochie's Gentlemen: The Story of Norfolk Island and the Roots of Modern Prison Reform, Oxford University Press USA, 2003, ISBN 978-0-19-516912-6.
- Norval Morris and David Rothman, The Oxford History of the Prison, Oxford University Press, 1995, ASIN: B001UW5S3G.
- Norval Morris, The Brothel Boy and Other Parables of the Law, Oxford University Press USA, 1992, ISBN 978-0-19-509386-5.
- Norval Morris and Michael Tonry, Between Prison and Probation: Intermediate Punishments in a Rational Sentencing System, St. Martin's Press, 1986, ASIN: B002KUGAE8; 1991, ASIN: B002G6T6O2.
- Norval Morris, Madness and the Criminal Law, University of Chicago Press, 1982, ASIN: B0025RQLWW.
- Norval Morris and Gordon J. Hawkins, The Honest Politician's Guide to Crime Control, University of Chicago Press, 1970, 1972, ISBN 978-0-226-53902-7; Phoenix Books, 1970, 279 pages, ISBN 978-0-226-53901-0.
