= Joseph Henry Beale =

American law professor (1861–1943)

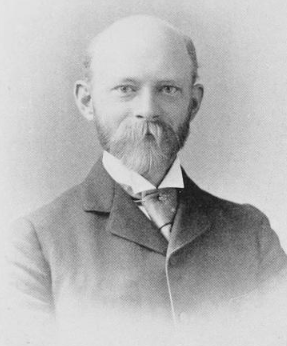
- Born: October 12, 1861; Dorchester, Boston, Massachusetts, U.S.
- Died: January 20, 1943 (aged 81); Cambridge, Massachusetts, U.S.
- Education: Harvard University (AB, LLB)
- Occupations: Lawyer, Law Professor
- Spouse: Elizabeth Chadwick Day
- Parents: Joseph Henry Beale (father); Frances E. Messinger (mother)
- Relatives: Joseph Swift Beale (grandfather), Susanna Holbrook Adams (grandmother), Capt. Benjamin Beale, Joseph Grant Beale, John Quincy Adams, John Adams, Samuel Adams, Samuel Adams Sr. John Lothropp, King Edward I

Joseph Henry Beale (October 12, 1861 – January 20, 1943) was an American law professor at Harvard Law School and served as the first dean of the University of Chicago Law School from 1902 to 1904. He was notable for his advancement of legal formalism, as well as his work in conflict of laws, corporations, and criminal law.

== Early life and education ==
Beale was born in the neighborhood of Dorchester in Boston, Massachusetts. He attended Harvard University as an undergraduate, distinguishing himself in classics and mathematics. He graduated fifth in his class in 1882.

He studied law at Harvard Law School. Upon graduation, he declined an offer to clerk for the United States Supreme Court, and opened his own practice.

== Legal and academic career ==
Beale worked for several years in his own practice, authoring or co-authoring several treatises during this time, including an influential treatise on damages. Based upon the reputation of this treatise, Beale was offered the post of assistant professor at Harvard Law School in 1892.

During his career at Harvard Law School, Beale was a renowned and influential legal scholar. One of Beale's most famous works of scholarship was his 1916 essay entitled "The Nature of Law" which appeared in the treatise "Treatise on the Conflict of Laws." Beale was best known, along with Christopher Columbus Langdell, as an influential proponent of the model of legal thought known as legal formalism. Harvard Law School awards the Joseph H. Beale prize to the student who obtains the highest grade during the academic year in the course on Conflict of Laws.

In 1902, at the request of William Rainey Harper, first President of the University of Chicago, for assistance from Harvard's faculty in setting up a law school at Chicago, Beale was "lent" by Harvard to become the first dean of the University of Chicago Law School. During his two-year tenure (a leave of absence from Harvard), Beale hired numerous faculty and established Chicago's law school as "one of the best in the country," garnering Beale honorary degrees from Chicago and the University of Michigan. Chicago continues to award the Joseph Henry Beale prize for outstanding performance in legal research and writing to first-year students every year. He was elected a Fellow of the American Academy of Arts and Sciences in 1906.

In 1934, he was overcome with emotion in arguing for the removal of "Protestant" from the name of the Episcopal Church.

He died at his home in Cambridge on January 20, 1943.
