= Multidistrict litigation =

Special federal legal procedure designed to speed the process of handling complex cases

In United States law, multidistrict litigation (MDL) refers to a special federal legal procedure designed to speed the process for handling complex cases with numerous plaintiffs making similar claims, such as air disaster litigation or complex product liability suits.

== Description ==
MDL cases occur when "civil actions involving one or more common questions of fact are pending in different districts." In order to efficiently process cases that could involve hundreds (or thousands) of plaintiffs in dozens of different federal courts that all share common issues, the Judicial Panel on Multidistrict Litigation (JPML) decides whether cases should be "centralized" under the MDL statute ("centralization" is the JPML's term of art for MDL transfers), and if so, where the cases should be transferred. Cases subject to MDL are sent from one court, known as the transferor, to another, known as the transferee, for all pretrial proceedings and discovery. If a case is not settled or dismissed in the transferee court, it is remanded (that is, sent back) to the transferor court for trial.

It is common for the JPML to learn after ordering centralization of the existence of additional pending actions involving the same or similar questions of fact as the actions it had just centralized. Either they had already been filed but the JPML was unaware of them at the time, or they were filed after centralization. These so-called "tag-along actions" are almost always also subject to centralization once they come to the attention of the panel.

== Statute ==
The MDL statute is 28 U.S.C. § 1407 in the United States Code. Section 1407 came about because of the first large-scale complex litigation to engulf the federal judiciary: the gigantic antitrust scandal in the U.S. electrical equipment industry in the early 1960s. The scandal resulted in the filing of 1,912 separate civil actions in district courts in 36 federal judicial districts, which together pleaded a total of 25,714 claims involving 20 product lines. In January 1962, Chief Justice Earl Warren appointed a Co-ordinating Committee for Multiple Litigation (CCML) of the United States District Courts. The chair of the CCML was Alfred P. Murrah, then the chief judge of the Tenth Circuit. The CCML responded to the emergency with a number of ad hoc procedures that would become commonplace in multidistrict litigation, such as consolidated national depositions and document depositories. Through aggressive case management, the CCML was able to terminate the electrical equipment litigation by March 1967; only nine cases went to trial and only five of those went to verdict.

In the course of its work, the CCML discovered that complex litigation involving similar issues in multiple districts was becoming a regularly recurring problem in federal courts, and recommended the enactment of a formal statutory foundation for their management in March 1964. It was the CCML's secretary, Phil C. Neal, who first conceived of the concept now known as multidistrict litigation. This eventually led to the enactment of the MDL statute four years later and the creation of the JPML as a permanent replacement for the CCML. Besides Murrah, other key players in the legislative maneuvering that led to the enactment of the MDL statute included federal district judge William H. Becker and Senator Joseph Tydings, the chair of the Senate Judiciary Committee.

The CCML's original plan for turning Neal's idea into a reality was a statute which would merely enable the Advisory Committee on Civil Rules (an existing advisory body to the Committee on Rules of Practice and Procedure of the Judicial Conference of the United States) to revise the Federal Rules of Civil Procedure (FRCP) to create rules to govern multidistrict litigation. The CCML changed course in June 1964 after observing the messy and time-consuming battle in the Advisory Committee over its proposed amendments to the FRCP joinder rules—especially Rule 23, the source of the modern opt-out class action. The CCML's new plan was to "cut the rule makers out of the process entirely and instead lodge power over MDL in the new JPML". This is why MDL procedure ended up evolving on its own track, in a manner distinct from traditional federal civil procedure.

The New York corporate defense bar recognized the significant risks posed by the future aggregation of plaintiffs' claims in MDLs to large defendants (like their own clients). In 1966, they successfully manipulated the American Bar Association's (ABA) House of Delegates into a vote to oppose the CCML's proposed bill, and this stalled the bill in Congress. In 1967, the judges supporting the proposed MDL statute and the lawyers opposing them met face to face. They hammered out a compromise under which the lawyers dropped their opposition to the bill in exchange for the chance to assist with the drafting of what eventually became the Manual on Complex Litigation (a handbook of nonbinding guidelines for judicial management of MDLs). After the ABA dropped its opposition, Congress finally passed the bill, and the MDL statute was signed into federal law by President Lyndon B. Johnson on April 29, 1968.

== Cases ==
In the decades since Congress enacted the MDL statute in 1968, MDLs have evolved into the federal judiciary's primary method for managing complex civil litigation. Once a small minority, MDLs have gradually become the dominant component of the U.S. federal civil caseload. In early 2020, the JPML published statistical data revealing that by the end of 2018, 51.9 percent of all pending federal civil cases had been centralized into MDLs. This was the first time that more than half of all federal civil cases had ended up in MDLs. In particular, "of the 301,766 civil cases pending in the federal court system at the close of 2018, 156,511 were pending in 248 MDLs." As percentages of the total number of MDLs, the top three categories were products liability (32.9%), antitrust (24.1%), and sales practices (12.1%). In terms of the percentage of the total number of civil cases in MDLs, products liability was overwhelmingly dominant at 91 percent.

In connection with MDLs' rise to prominence, they have become subject to widespread criticism from attorneys for both plaintiffs and defendants because they largely operate outside of the traditional civil procedure framework established by the FRCP. In other words, over half of American federal civil actions are no longer actually litigated under the rules taught in American law schools, as the MDL procedure has evolved from a "pretrial management tool toward an alternative dispute resolution medium setting the table for global settlements."

Most MDLs involve a few dozen to a few hundred cases. The notable exception is MDL No. 875, based in the Eastern District of Pennsylvania, which is the largest and longest-lasting MDL. It was created in 1991 by the JPML to manage all asbestos personal injury and wrongful death cases in the federal courts. As of 2011, over 121,000 cases had been transferred into MDL No. 875, and over 108,000 cases had been settled, dismissed, or remanded, leaving about 13,000 pending.

One controversial aspect of MDLs is that the MDL statute does not grant the transferee court any discretion as to remand for trial, even when both courts would prefer to keep the case in the transferee court for trial. After all, by the time a case reaches the trial stage, the transferee has become intimately familiar with the issues, the parties, and their attorneys (because the transferee court will normally have decided one or more motions for summary judgment at that point), while the transferor court must spend time catching up on what happened while the case was away in the MDL. To reduce that burden on transferor courts, the Manual on Complex Litigation advises transferee courts to provide transferor courts with an order summarizing what has already happened and what issues remain for discovery and trial.

The MDL statute had always been intended to cover only pretrial proceedings. But as soon as Section 1407 was enacted in 1968, federal courts began to hold that the transferee court had the power to transfer a case to itself for all purposes—including trial—a so-called "self-transfer". The JPML recognized the existence of the self-transfer procedure as early as 1972, and eventually endorsed that practice in its rules. In 1998, however, the U.S. Supreme Court brought self-transfers to a halt by ruling that the plain language of the MDL statute required remand back to the transferor for trial, and invalidated the JPML's rule. The primary exception to the current interpretation of Section 1407 as prohibiting self-transfers is that the parties can voluntarily consent to keep a case in the transferee court for trial.

Another controversial aspect of MDLs is whether they provide adequate protection of the rights of the parties (as contrasted against litigating each case on an individual basis). A 2021 University of Georgia School of Law survey of MDL plaintiffs found broad dissatisfaction with the quality of the legal representation they had received. According to the survey's organizers, it was the first-ever large-scale survey of MDL plaintiffs. More than 75 percent said they were not kept informed about developments in their case, and 60 percent said they did not entirely trust their lawyers to act in their best interests. The survey respondents also were critical of the lawyers' fees.

== State law ==
When state law cases filed in federal court under diversity jurisdiction are consolidated into MDLs, the Erie doctrine comes into play and confronts federal district judges with some of the most difficult, multilayered legal questions they will ever see in their careers. The problem is that when sitting in diversity and asked to decide dispositive pretrial motions like the motion for summary judgment, the transferee court must apply the law of the state of the transferor court, which could be located anywhere in the United States. But in complex product liability cases such as airplane crashes, the victims might not even be American citizens and the plaintiffs' losses may not even have occurred within the borders of the United States, and of course, every U.S. state has its own choice-of-law rules. The result is that a MDL judge often has to sort through the laws of two, three, or four separate jurisdictions, none of which may be the state which the transferee court sits in, just to determine whether a plaintiff has a viable cause of action. Naturally, the lawyers in the proceeding must first educate themselves and the judge about the relevant laws from all those jurisdictions.

== State courts ==
As one expert has noted, "perhaps the most serious limitation" of the MDL statute is that the JPML "has no authority over actions pending in state courts". This arises from a fundamental limitation of federal courts: they are courts of limited jurisdiction under the federal Constitution and lack the general jurisdiction of state courts. Congress has partially addressed this problem by making it easier to remove certain types of actions from state courts to federal courts (e.g., the Class Action Fairness Act of 2005), but has not been able (and is probably unable under the current Constitution) to enact a statute granting plenary jurisdiction to the JPML to implement pretrial coordination and consolidation between federal and state courts.

In the absence of federal guidance, state courts have developed several different approaches to intrastate pretrial coordination and consolidation of civil actions pending in different trial courts that share common questions of fact. A 2021 article found that as of that year, twenty-six states appear to have no approach at all; thirteen states have developed formal mechanisms either modeled after or roughly analogous to the MDL statute; seven states have procedures allowing for the affected trial court judges to coordinate with each other; and four states have a history of ad hoc consolidation but no formal mechanism in place.

There is much diversity among the states that have some form of MDL procedure. Only Colorado, New York, Texas, and West Virginia follow the federal model of maintaining a standing panel of judges to handle centralization issues. Only Kansas, New York, and Texas follow the federal rule that transfer is solely for pretrial proceedings and cases must be remanded back to transferor courts for trial. As for the other states with a MDL-like procedure, the general rule is that transfer is for all purposes including trial, and centralization issues are handled either by the state supreme court sitting en banc, the chief justice of the state (acting alone or on the recommendation of another judge), or an ad hoc panel.

== International influence ==
The American experience with managing MDLs came to the attention of Lord Woolf and led to major reforms in English law during the late 1990s. This process culminated in the 1998 promulgation of the Civil Procedure Rules.
