= The Journal of Legal Studies =

- Discipline: Law
- Language: English
- Edited by: Adriana Z. Robertson and Sonja B. Starr

Publication details
- History: 1972-present
- Publisher: University of Chicago Press for the University of Chicago Law School (United States)
- Frequency: Biannually
- Impact factor: 1.143 (2017)

Standard abbreviations
- Bluebook: J. Legal Stud.
- ISO 4: J. Leg. Stud.

Indexing
- ISSN: 0047-2530 (print); 1537-5366 (web)
- JSTOR: 00472530
- OCLC no.: 1754648

Links
- Journal homepage; Online access

The Journal of Legal Studies is a law journal published by the University of Chicago Press focusing on interdisciplinary academic research in law and legal institutions.

It emphasizes social science approaches, especially those of economics, political science, and psychology. The journal was established in 1972. Richard Posner was a founding editor. The current editors are Adriana Z. Robertson and Sonja B. Starr.
