= List of University of Chicago Law School alumni =

This list of University of Chicago Law School alumni consists of notable people who graduated or attended the University of Chicago Law School. The school has produced many distinguished alumni in the judiciary, government and politics, academia, and business, and other fields. Its alumni include heads of state and politicians around the world; the Lord Chief Justice of England and Wales; the president of the Supreme Court of Israel; judges of United States Courts of Appeals; several U.S. attorneys general and solicitors general; members of Congress and cabinet officials, privy counsellors; university presidents and faculty deans; founders of the law firms Kirkland & Ellis, Baker McKenzie, and Jenner & Block; CEOs and chairpersons of multinational corporations; and contributors to literature, journalism, and the arts. The law school counts among its alumni recipients of the Presidential Medal of Freedom, Fulbright Scholars, Rhodes Scholars, Marshall Scholars, Commonwealth Fellows, National Humanities Medallists, and Pulitzer Prize winners.

Classes at the law school started in 1902. All degrees listed below are J.D., unless noted otherwise.

== Law and government ==
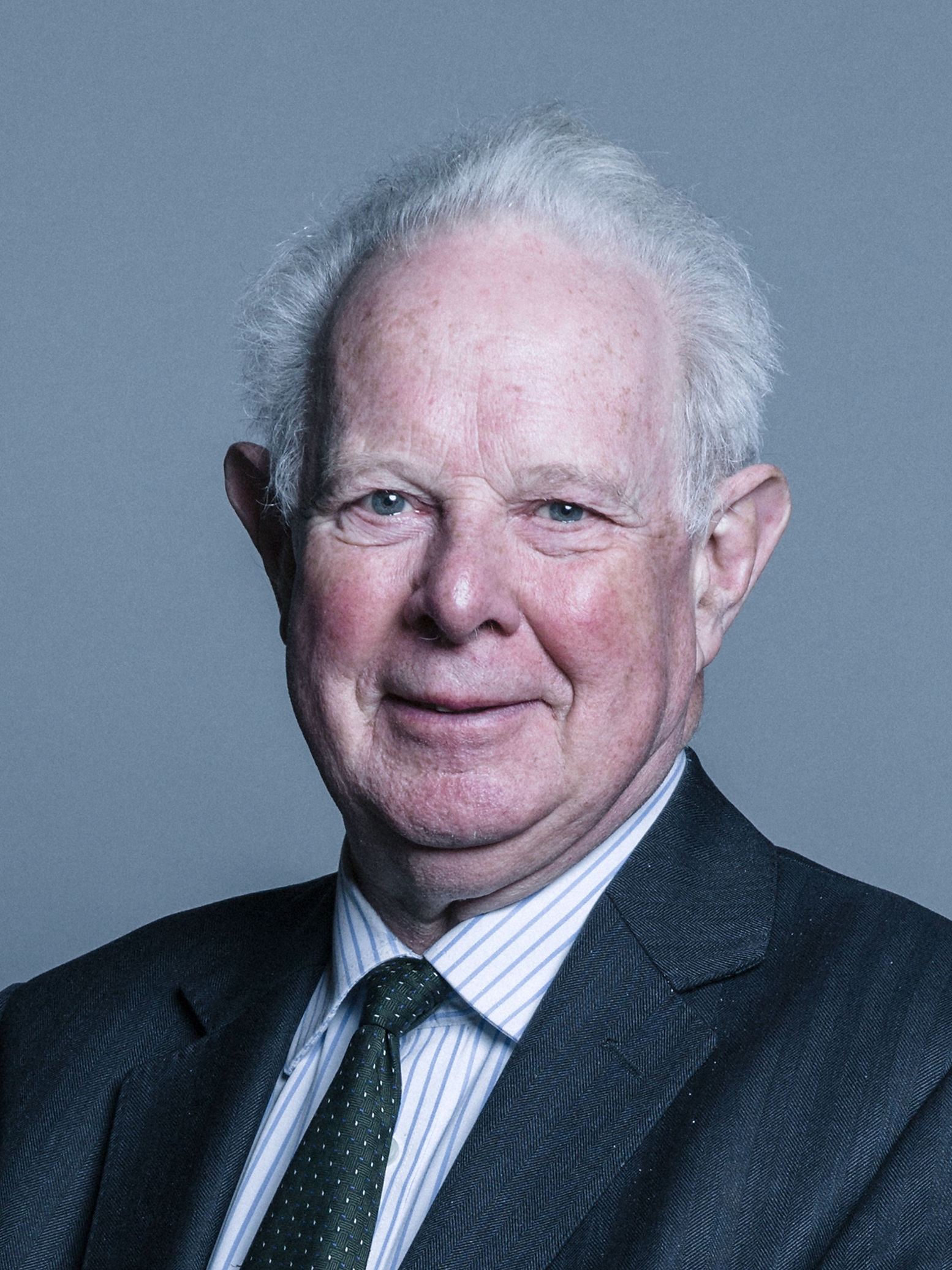
Lord Thomas '70

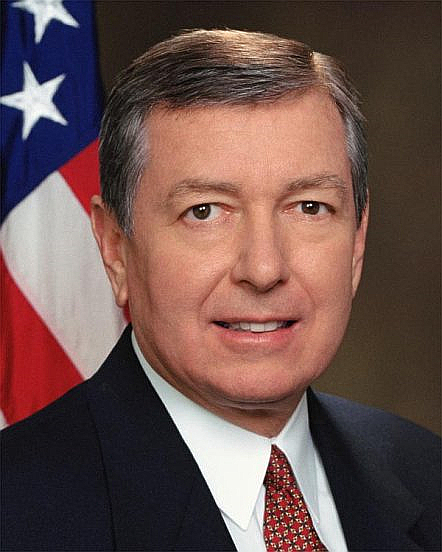
Attorney General John Ashcroft '65

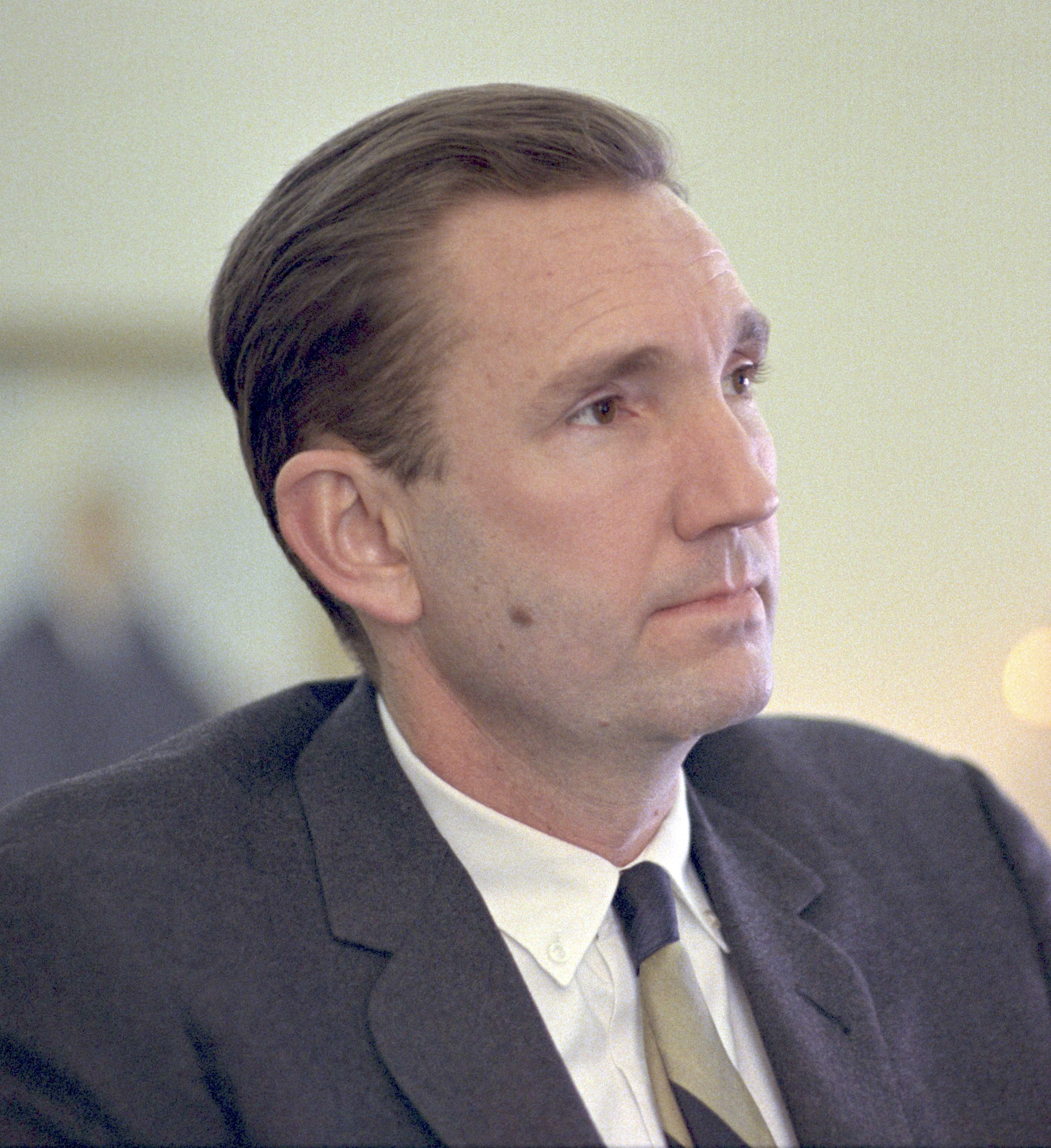
Attorney General Ramsey Clark '50

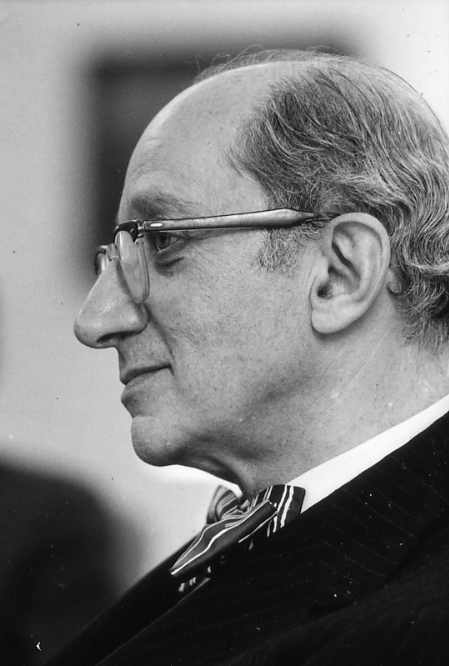
Attorney General and Dean Edward H. Levi '35

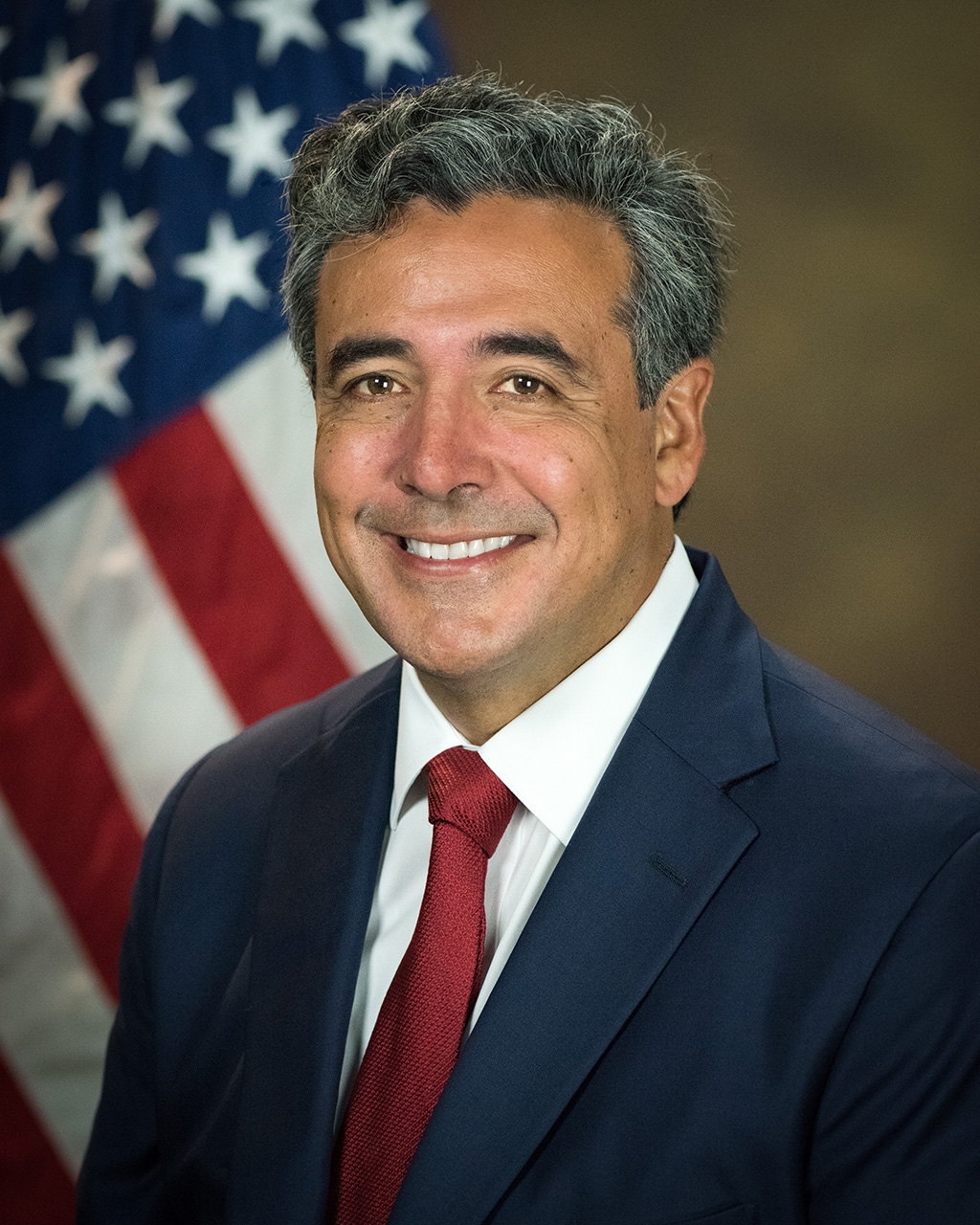
Solicitor General Noel Francisco '91

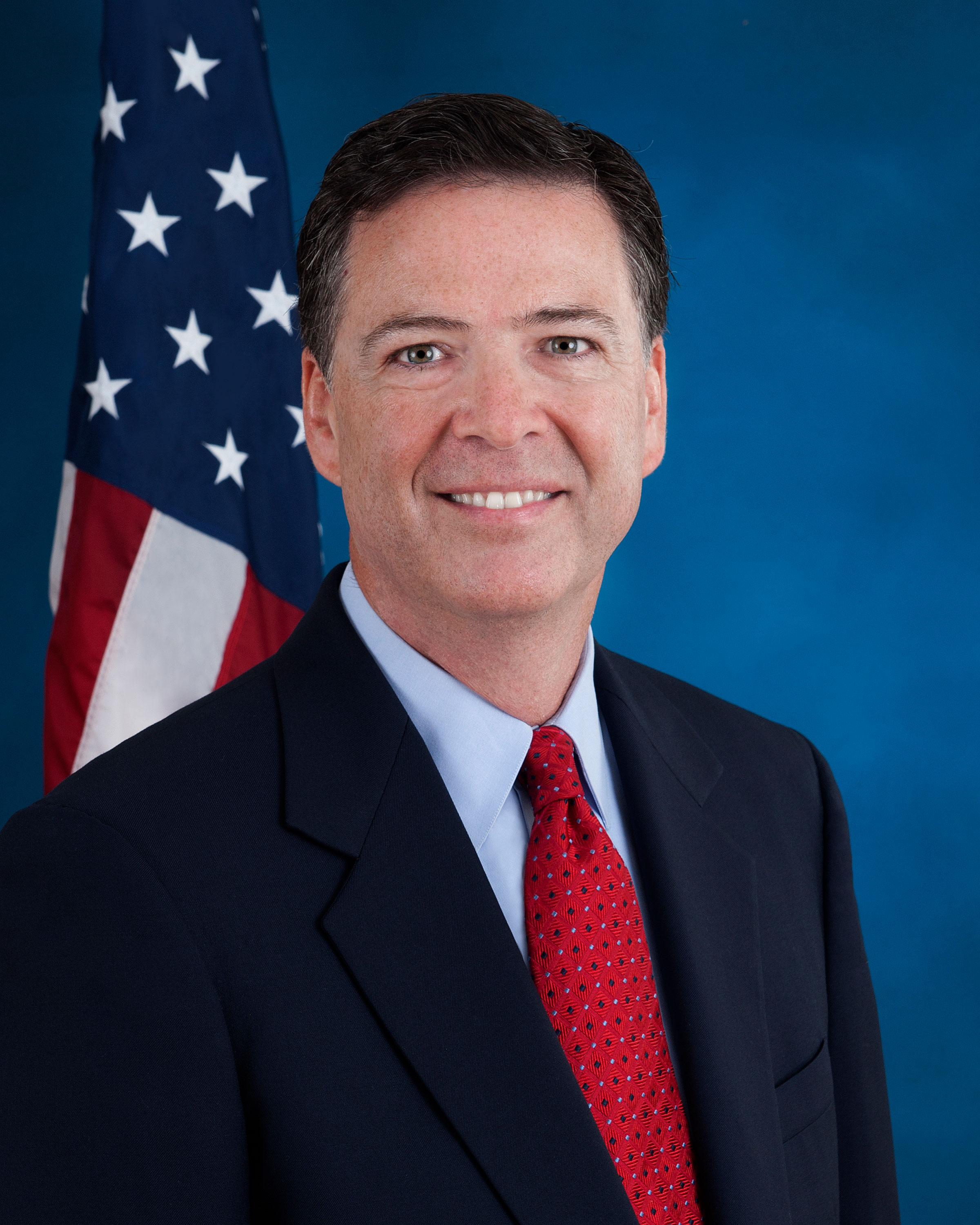
FBI Director James Comey '85

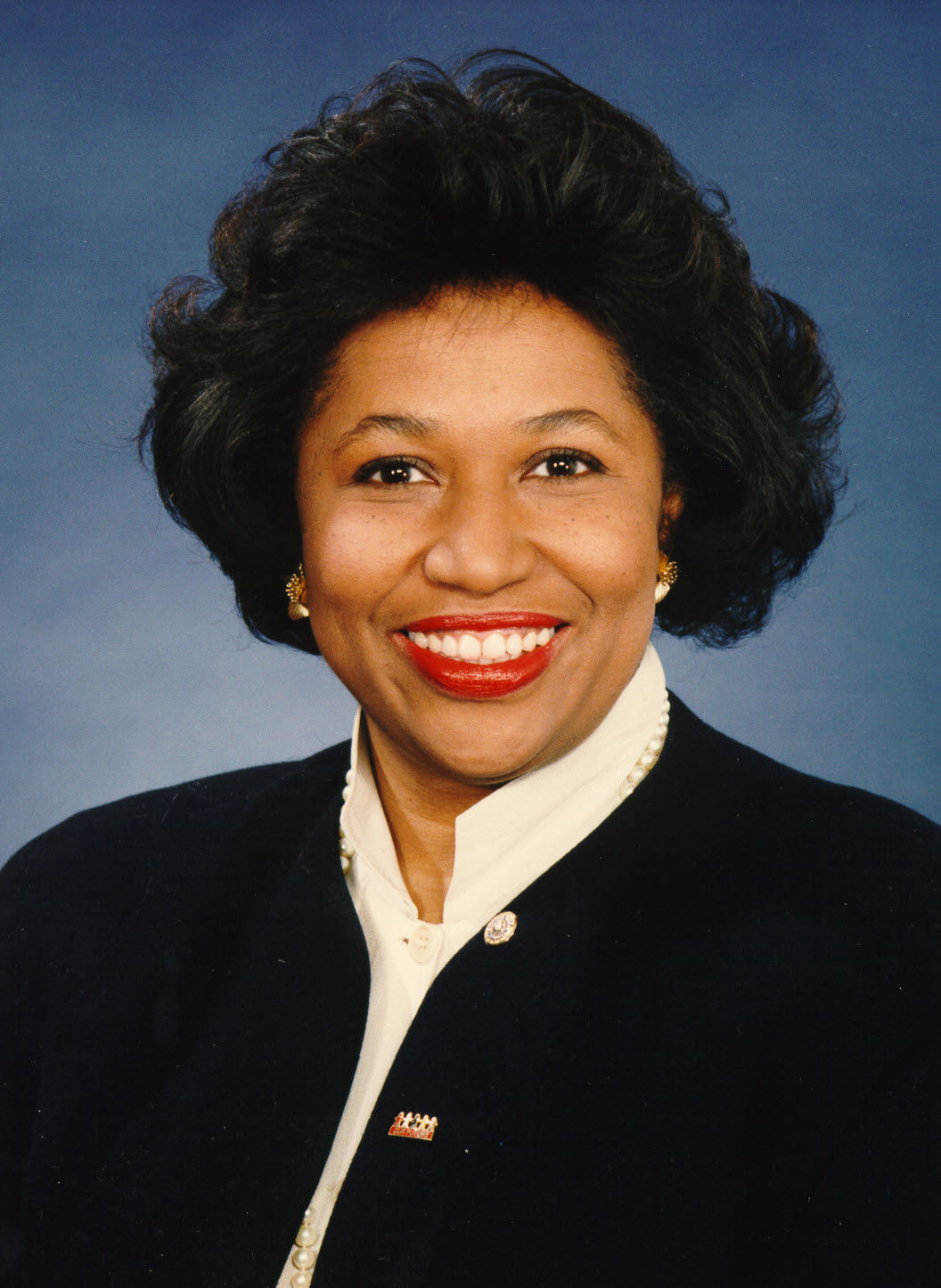
Senator and Ambassador Carol Moseley Braun '72

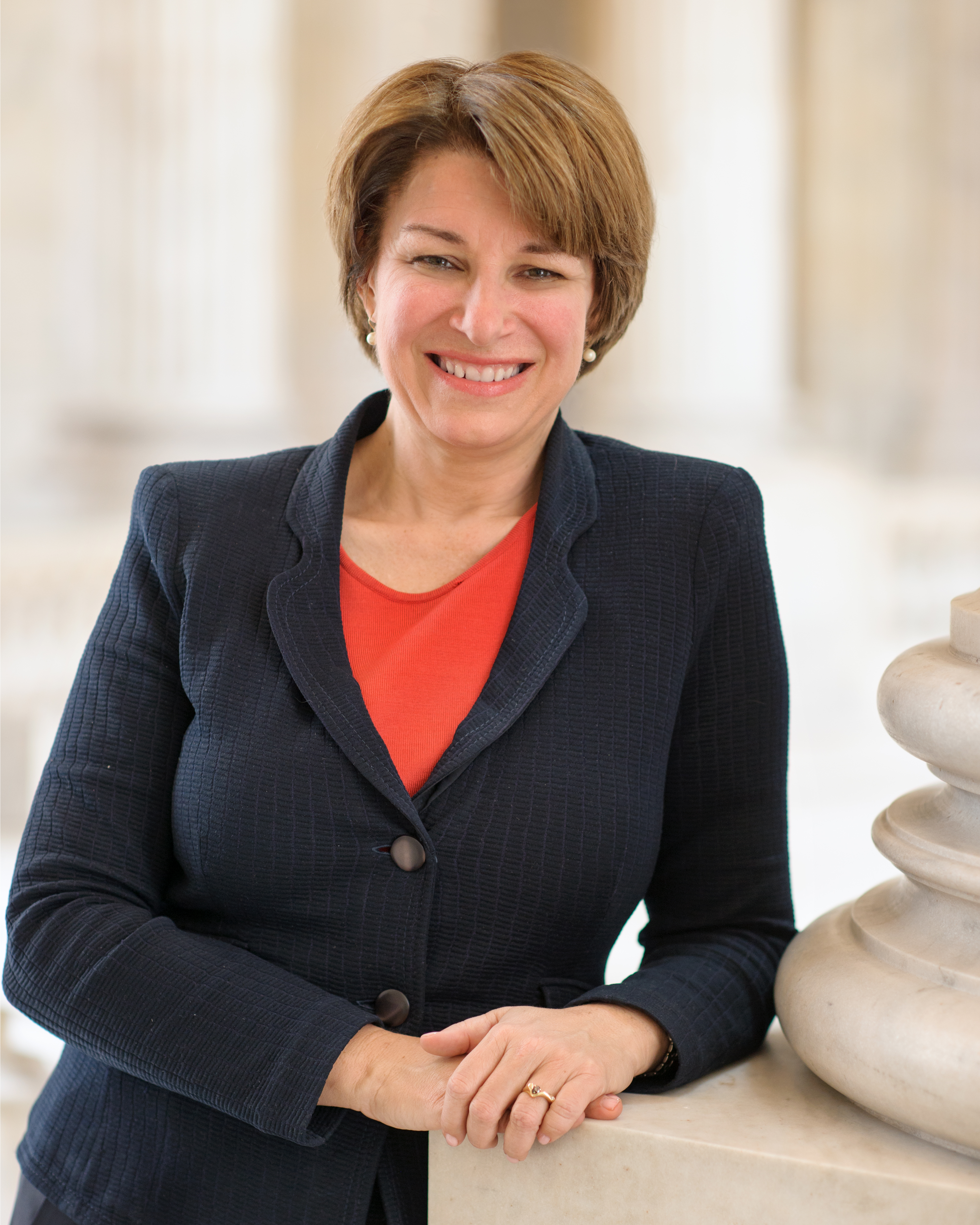
Senator Amy Klobuchar '85

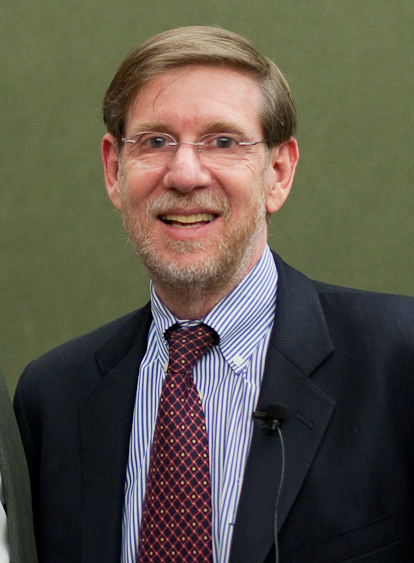
Co-chair of COVID-19 Advisory Board David A. Kessler '77

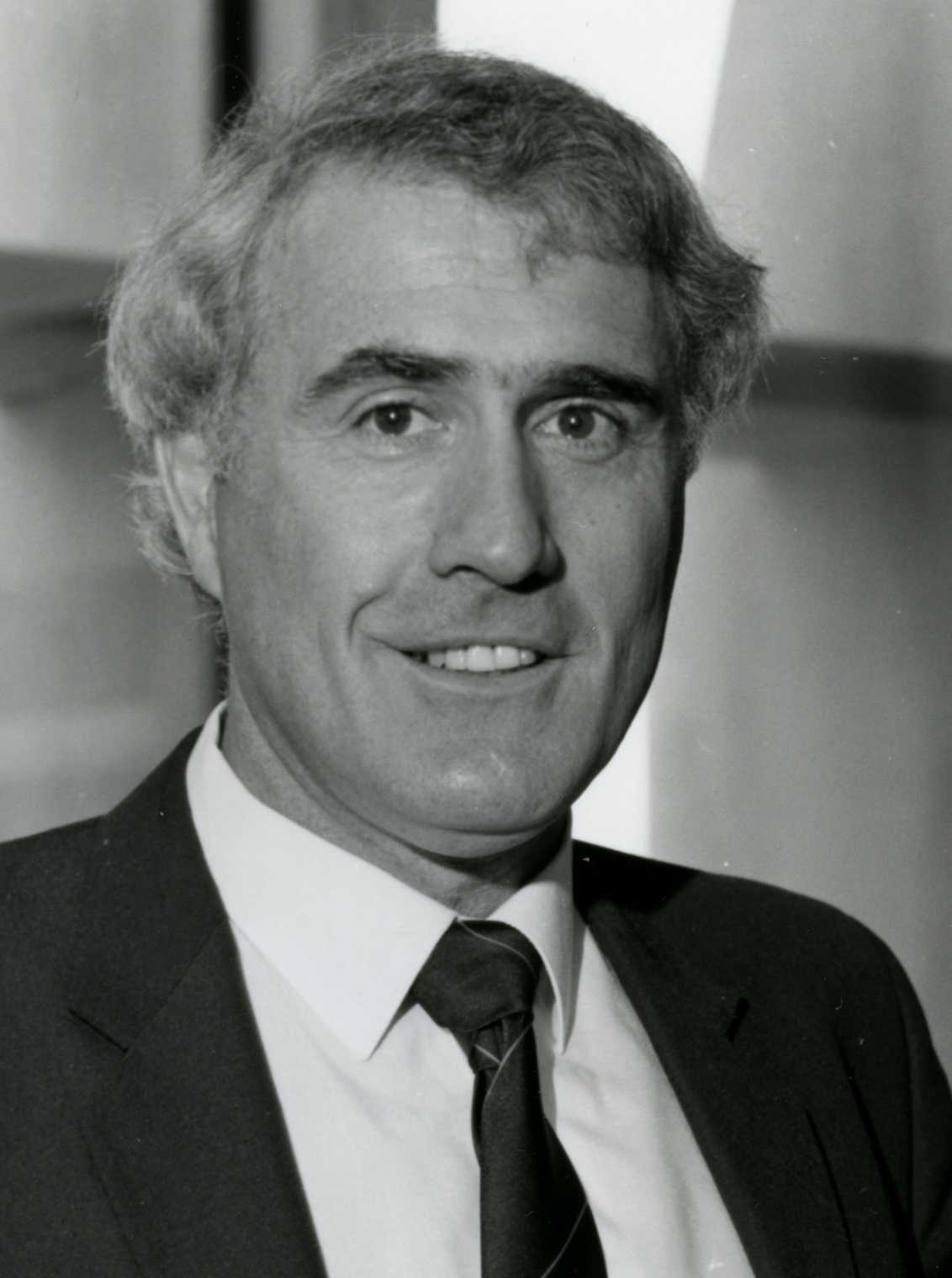
Prime Minister of New Zealand Geoffrey Palmer '67

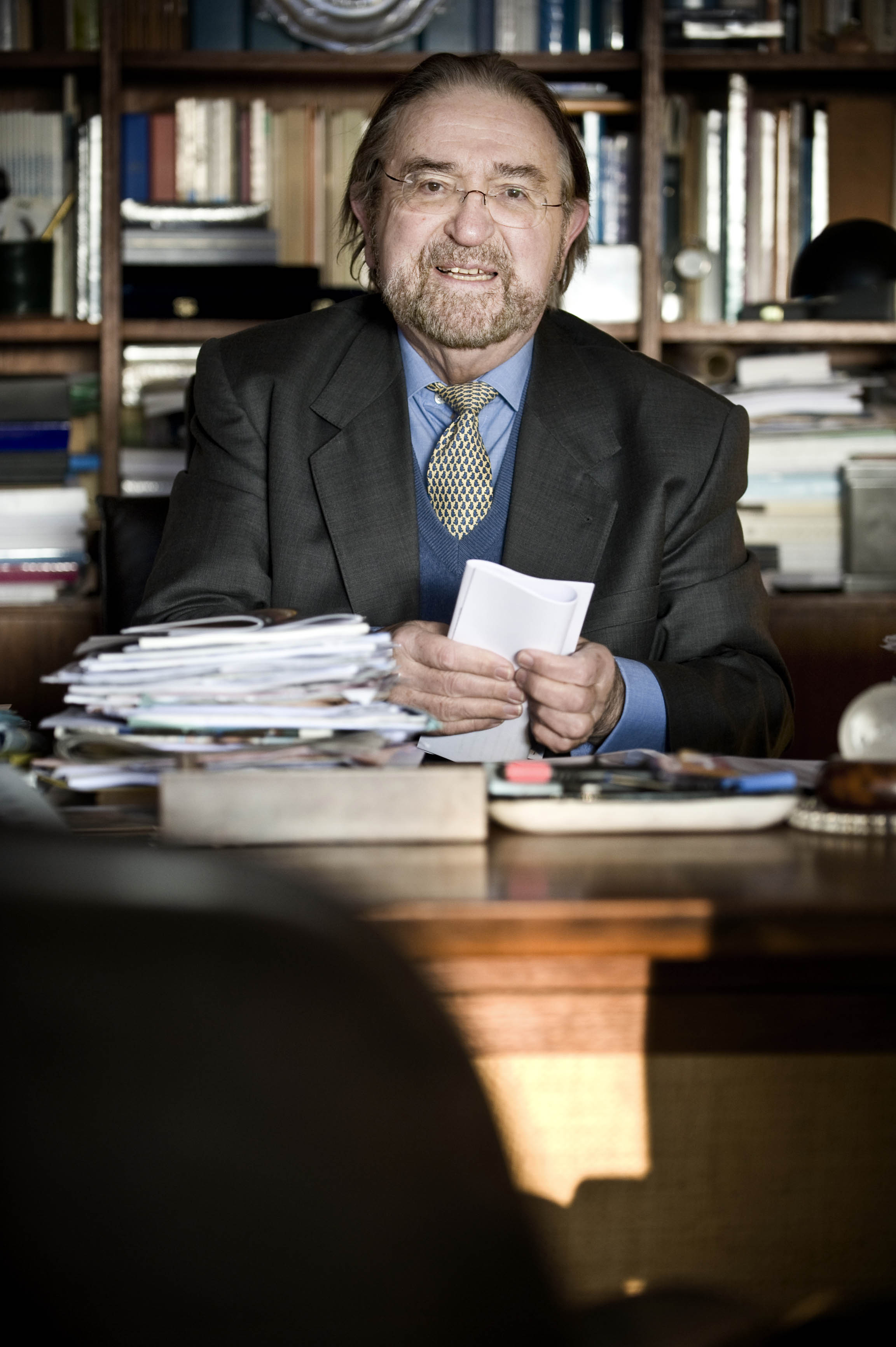
Longest-serving member of Belgian Federal Parliament Herman De Croo '62

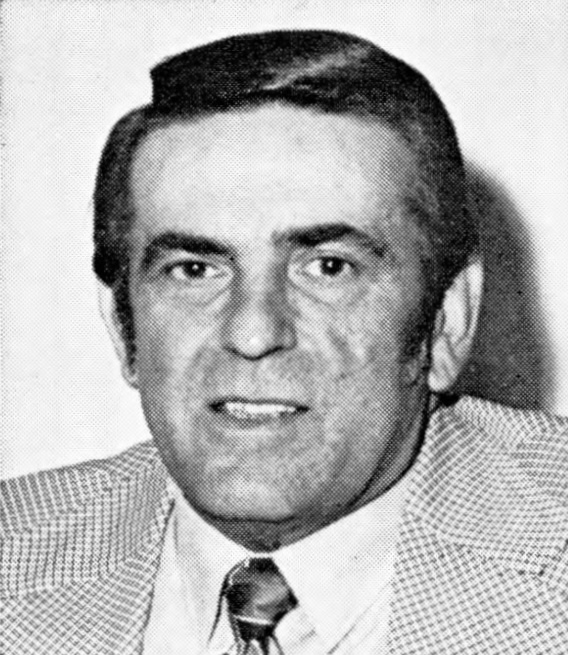
27th White House Counsel and Judge Abner Mikva '51

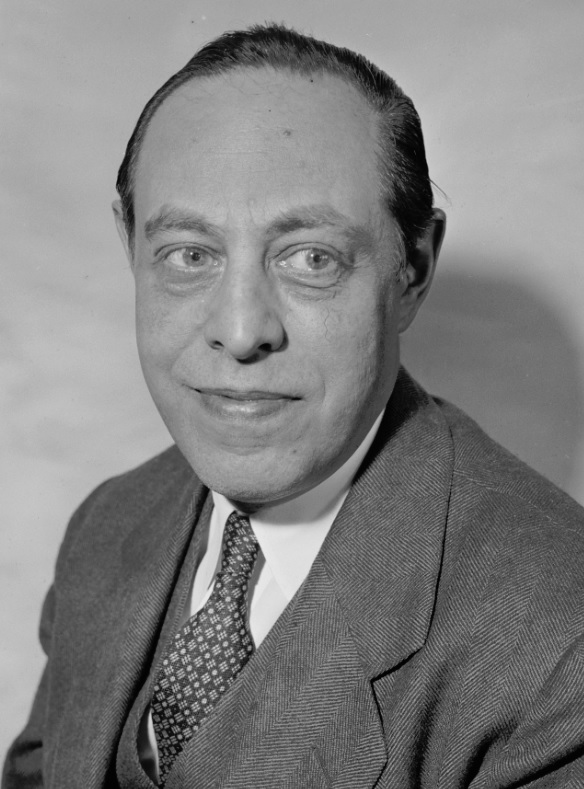
Judge and philosopher Jerome Frank '12

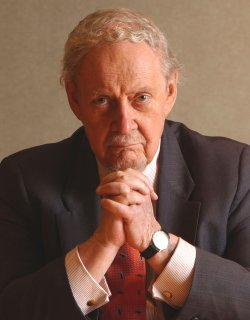
Judge and Solicitor General Robert Bork '53

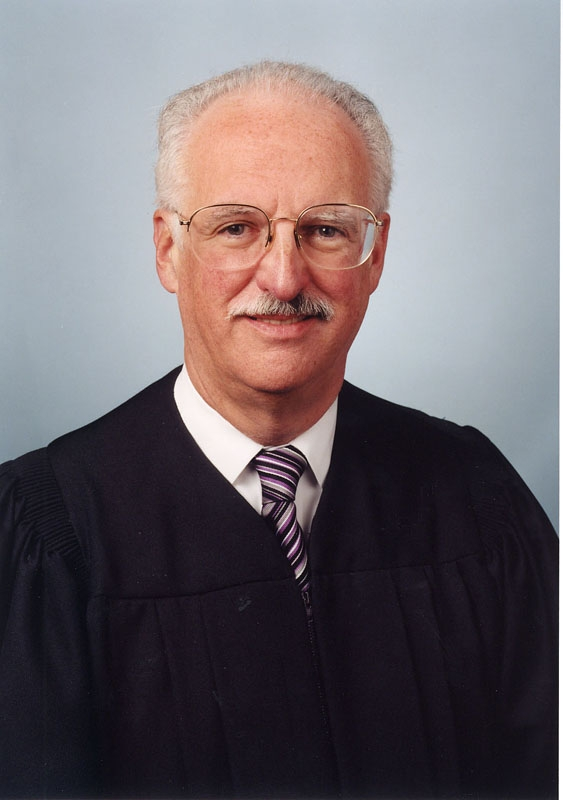
Judge Douglas H. Ginsburg '73

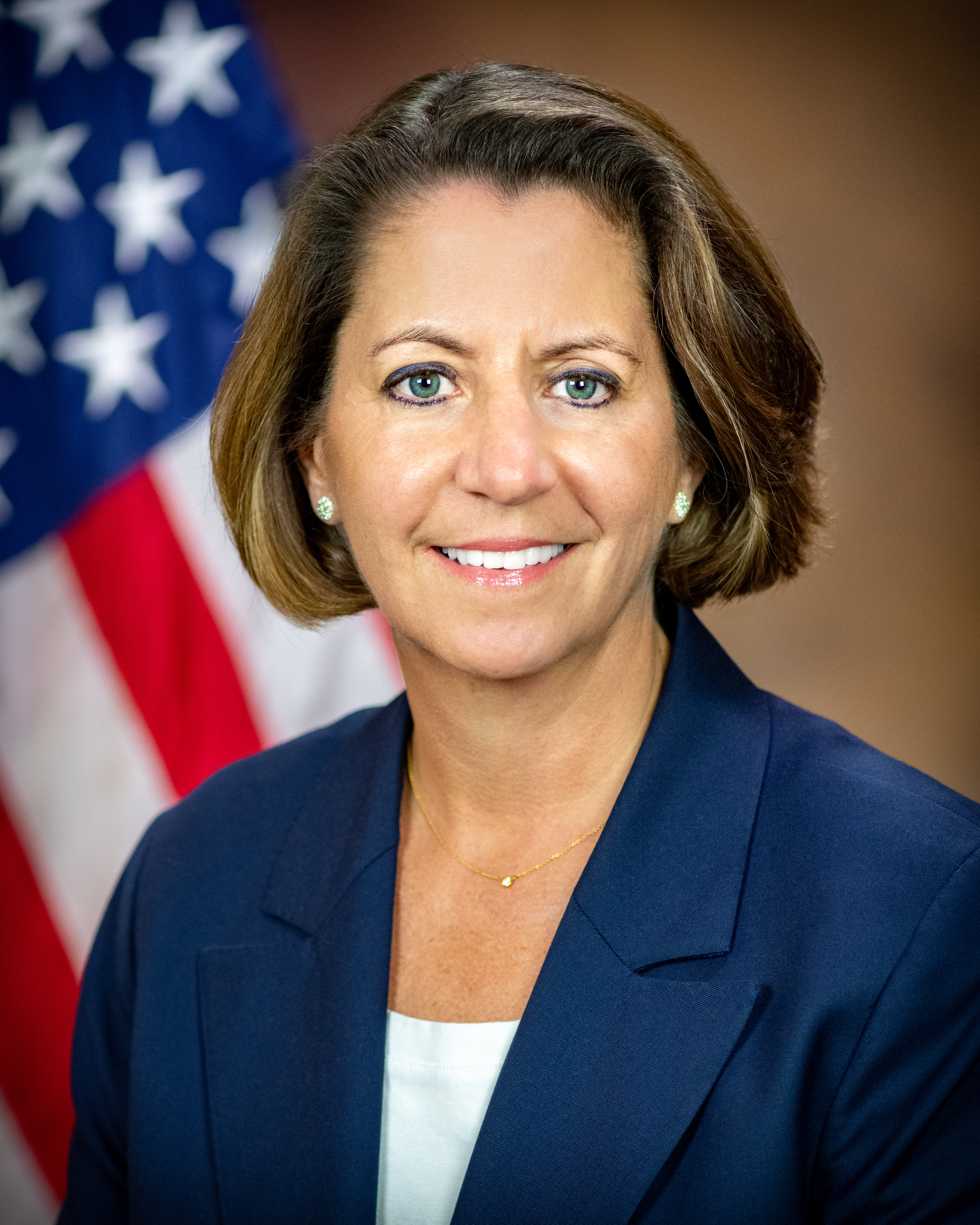
Deputy Attorney General Lisa Monaco '97

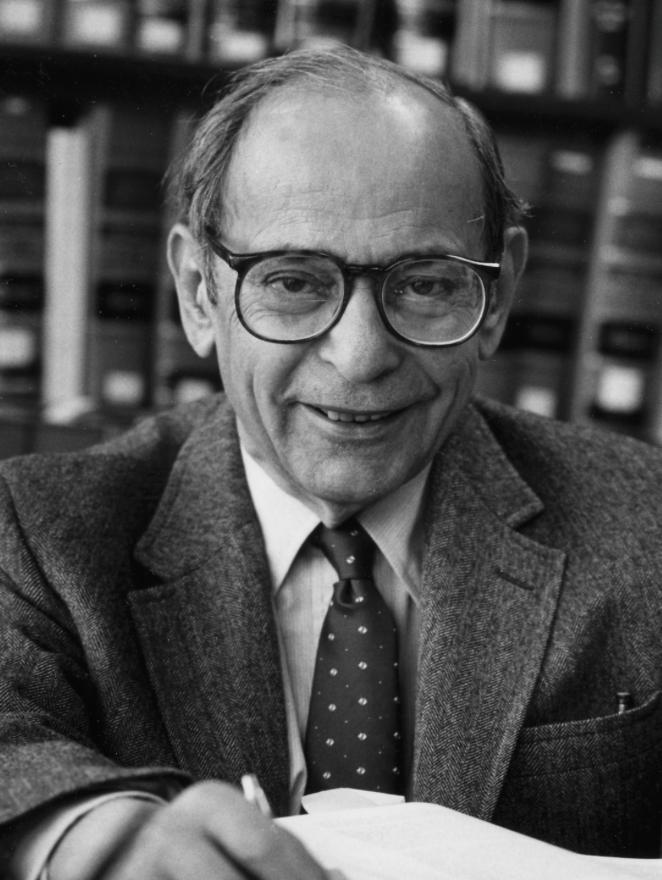
Nuremberg trials prosecutor Bernard D. Meltzer '37

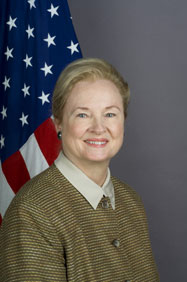
Ambassador and Professor Mary Ann Glendon '61

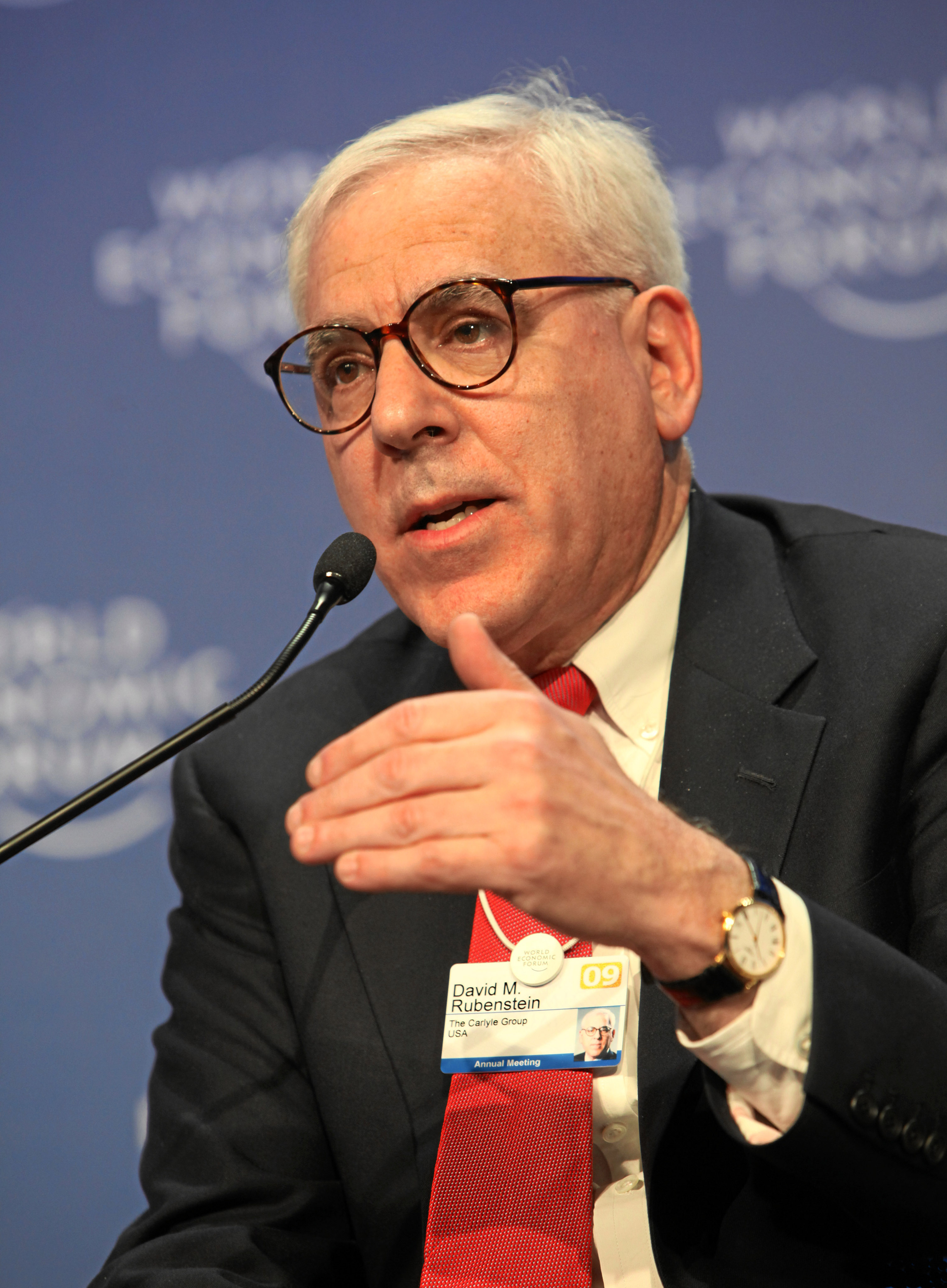
Billionaire and founder of The Carlyle Group David Rubenstein '73

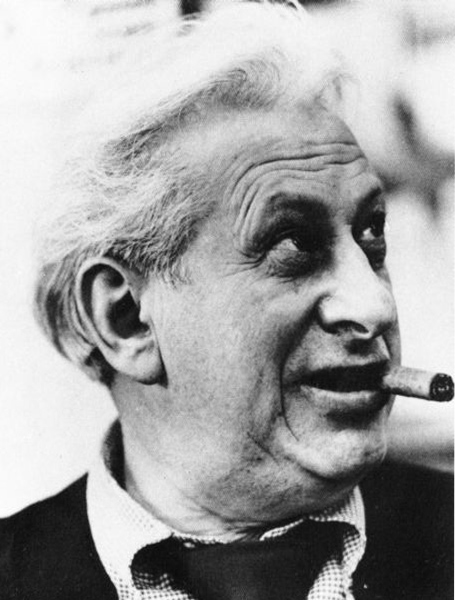
Pulitzer Prize winner Studs Terkel '34

=== United States government ===
==== Executive branch ====
===== U.S. attorneys general =====
- John Ashcroft (1967), 79th U.S. attorney general (2001–2005)
- Ramsey Clark (1950), 66th U.S. attorney general (1966–1969)
- Edward H. Levi (1935), 71st U.S. attorney general (1975–1977)

===== U.S. solicitors general =====
- Robert Bork (1953), 35th U.S. solicitor general (1973–1977); also judge of the United States Court of Appeals for the District of Columbia Circuit (1982–1988)
- Noel Francisco (1996), 47th U.S. solicitor general (2017–2020)
- Rex E. Lee (1963), 37th U.S. solicitor general (1981–1985); also president of Brigham Young University (1989–1995)

===== Other cabinet and cabinet-level officials =====
- Mary Azcuenaga (1973), commissioner of the Federal Trade Commission (1984–1998)
- Pat Cipollone (1991), 39th White House counsel (2018–2021)
- James Comey (1985), 7th director of the Federal Bureau of Investigation (2013–2017); also 31st U.S. deputy attorney general (2003–2005)
- Douglas M. Costle (1964), administrator of the Environmental Protection Agency (1977–1981)
- Harold L. Ickes (1907), 32nd secretary of the interior (1933–1946); also high commissioner to the Philippines (1942–1945)
- Kevin McAleenan (1998), United States secretary of Homeland Security (2019); also commissioner of U.S. Customs and Border Protection (2017–2019)
- Abner Mikva (1951), 27th White House counsel (1994–1995); also judge and later chief judge of the U.S. Court of Appeals for the D.C. Circuit (1979–1994); and recipient of Presidential Medal of Freedom (2014)
- Lisa Monaco (1997), 39th U.S. deputy attorney general (2021–present), 6th U.S. Homeland Security advisor (2013–2017), and assistant attorney general for National Security (2011–2013)
- Abraham Ribicoff (1933), 4th secretary of Health, Education, and Welfare (1961–1962); also U.S. senator (D-Connecticut) (1963–1981) and 80th governor of Connecticut (1955–1961)
- Eugene Scalia (1990), 28th United States secretary of labor (2019–2021)
- Ed Siskel (2000), 42nd White House counsel (2023–present)

==== Legislative branch (U.S. Congress) ====
===== Senators =====
- Carol Moseley Braun (1972), U.S. senator (D-Illinois) (1993–1999); also United States ambassador to New Zealand (1999–2001) and United States Ambassador to Samoa (2000–2001)
- Zales Ecton (1921), U.S. senator (R-Montana) (1947–1953)
- Herbert E. Hitchcock, U.S. senator (D-South Dakota) (1936–1938)
- Roman Hruska (did not graduate), U.S. senator (R-Nebraska) (1954–1976)
- James W. Huffman (1922), U.S. senator (D-Ohio) (1945–1946)
- Amy Klobuchar (1985), U.S. senator (D-Minnesota) (2006–present)
- James P. Pope (1909), U.S. senator (D-Idaho) (1933–1939); also 35th mayor of Boise, Idaho (1929–1933)
- Abraham Ribicoff (1933), U.S. senator (D-Connecticut) (1963–1981); also 4th Secretary of Health, Education, and Welfare (1961–1962) and 80th governor of Connecticut (1955–1961)
- David W. Stewart (1917), U.S. senator (R-Iowa) (1926–1927)
- Jim Talent (1981), U.S. senator (R-Missouri) (2002–2007)

===== Representatives =====
- John B. Bennett (1926), U.S. representative (R-Michigan) (1943–1945, 1947–1964)
- Elizabeth Cheney (1996), U.S. representative (R-Wyoming) (2017–present) and Chair of the House Republican Conference (2019–2021)
- Albert M. Cole (1925), U.S. representative (R-Kansas) (1945–1953)
- James I. Dolliver (1921), U.S. representative (R-Iowa) (1945–1957)
- Edward C. Eicher (1906), U.S. representative (D-Iowa)(1933–1938); also chief justice of the U.S. District Court for the District of Columbia (1942–1944)
- Charles N. Fowler (1878), U.S. representative (R-New Jersey) (1895–1911)
- Edgar A. Jonas (1910), U.S. representative (R-Illinois) (1949–1955)
- David M. McIntosh (1983), U.S. representative (R-Indiana) (1995–2001)
- David Minge (1967), U.S. representative (D-Minnesota) (1993–2001); also judge of the Minnesota Court of Appeals (2002–2012)
- Patsy Mink (1951), U.S. representative (D-Hawaii) (1965–1971, 1990–2002) and recipient of Presidential Medal of Freedom (2014)
- Samuel J. Nicholls (1909), U.S. representative (D-South Carolina) (1915–1921)
- Kathryn O'Loughlin McCarthy (1920), U.S. representative (D-Kansas) (1933–1935)
- J. W. Robinson (1912), U.S. representative (D-Utah) (1933–1947)
- Jessie Sumner (1923), U.S. representative (R-Illinois) (1939–1947)
- Sidney R. Yates (1933), U.S. representative (D-Illinois (1949–1963, 1965–1999)

==== Judicial branch ====
===== Federal courts of appeals =====
- Florence E. Allen (did not graduate), judge and later chief judge of the U.S. Court of Appeals for the Sixth Circuit (1934–1966); also associate justice of the Ohio Supreme Court (1923–1934)
- Danny Julian Boggs (1968), judge and formerly chief judge of the U.S. Court of Appeals for the Sixth Circuit (1986–present)
- Frank H. Easterbrook (1973), judge and formerly chief judge of the U.S. Court of Appeals for the Seventh Circuit (1985–present)
- Allison H. Eid (1991), judge of the U.S. Court of Appeals for the Tenth Circuit (2017–present); also associate justice of the Colorado Supreme Court (2006–2017)
- Philip J. Finnegan (1913), judge of the U.S. Court of Appeals for the Seventh Circuit (1949–1959)
- Jerome Frank (1912), judge of U.S. Court of Appeals for the Second Circuit (1941–1957); Chairman of the Securities and Exchange Commission (1939–1941); and leading figure in the legal realism movement
- Douglas H. Ginsburg (1973), judge and formerly chief judge of the U.S. Court of Appeals for the D.C. Circuit (1986–present)
- James C. Ho (1999), judge of the U.S. Court of Appeals for the Fifth Circuit (2018–present); also 4th solicitor general of Texas (2008–2010)
- Anthony Johnstone (1999), judge of the U.S. Court of Appeals for the Ninth Circuit; also solicitor general of Montana (2008–2011)
- Michael W. McConnell (1979), judge of the U.S. Court of Appeals for the Tenth Circuit (2002–2009); also professor at Stanford Law School
- George Thomas McDermott (1909), judge of the U.S. Court of Appeals for the Tenth Circuit (1929–1937)
- Monroe G. McKay (1960), judge and formerly chief judge of the U.S. Court of Appeals for the Tenth Circuit (1977–2020)
- Abner Mikva (1951), judge and chief judge of the U.S. Court of Appeals for the D.C. Circuit (1979–1994); recipient of Presidential Medal of Freedom (2014)
- Eric D. Miller (1999), judge of the U.S. Court of Appeals for the Ninth Circuit (2019–present)
- Eric E. Murphy (2005), judge of the U.S. Court of Appeals for the Sixth Circuit (2018–present); also 9th solicitor general of Ohio (2013–2017)
- Walter Lyndon Pope (1912), judge and later chief judge of the U.S. Court of Appeals for the Ninth Circuit (1949–1969)
- Neomi Rao (1999), judge of the U.S. Court of Appeals for the District of Columbia Circuit (2019–present); also administrator of the Office of Information and Regulatory Affairs (2017–2019)
- Julius N. Richardson (2003), judge of the U.S. Court of Appeals for the Fourth Circuit (2018–present)
- Beth Robinson (1989), judge of the U.S. Court of Appeals for the Second Circuit (2021–present); also associate justice of the Vermont Supreme Court (2011–2021)
- Elmer Jacob Schnackenberg (1912), judge of the U.S. Court of Appeals for the Seventh Circuit (1954–1968)
- Mary M. Schroeder (1965), judge and formerly chief judge of the U.S. Court of Appeals for the Ninth Circuit (1979–2011)
- Milan Smith (1969), judge of the U.S. Court of Appeals for the Ninth Circuit (2006–present)
- Hardress Nathaniel Swaim (1916), judge of the U.S. Court of Appeals for the Seventh Circuit (1950–1957); also Justice of the Indiana Supreme Court (1939–1945)
- David S. Tatel (1966), judge of the U.S. Court of Appeals for the D.C. Circuit (1994–present)
- Eric Tung (2010), judge of the United States Court of Appeals for the Ninth Circuit (2025–present)

===== Federal district courts =====
- Richard B. Austin (1926), judge of the U.S. District Court for the Northern District of Illinois (1961–1977)
- Axel J. Beck (1922), judge and later chief judge of the U.S. District Court for the District of South Dakota (1958–1981)
- Morton A. Brody (1958), judge of the U.S. District Court for the District of Maine (1991–2000)
- Douglas R. Cole (1993), judge of the U.S. District Court for the Southern District of Ohio (2019–present); also 5th solicitor general of Ohio (2003–2006)
- Edward C. Eicher (1906), chief justice of the U.S. District Court for the District of Columbia (1942–1944); also U.S. Representative (D-Iowa)(1933–1938)
- Roger Thomas Foley (1910), judge and later chief judge of the U.S. District Court for the District of Nevada (1945–1974)
- Paul Grewal (1996), magistrate judge of the U.S. District Court for the Northern District of California (2010–2016); chief legal officer at Coinbase (2020–present)
- Terry J. Hatter Jr. (1960), judge and formerly chief judge of the U.S. District Court for the Central District of California (1979–present)
- Maria Lanahan (2013), judge of the U.S. District Court for the Eastern District of Missouri (2025–present)
- William Charles Lee (1962), judge and previously chief judge of the U.S. District Court for the Northern District of Indiana (1981–present)
- Harry Leinenweber (1962), judge of the U.S. District Court for the Northern District of Illinois (1985–present)
- William J. Martínez (1980), judge of the U.S. District Court for the District of Colorado (2010–present)
- Claude C. McColloch (1909), judge and later chief judge of the U.S. District Court for the District of Oregon (1937–1959)
- Peter Jo Messitte (1966), judge of the U.S. District Court for the District of Maryland (2008–present)
- Walker David Miller (LL.M. 1965), judge of the U.S. District Court for the District of Colorado (1996–2013)
- Robert Dale Morgan (1937), judge and later chief judge of the U.S. District Court for the Central District of Illinois (1979–2002) and judge and later chief judge of the U.S. District Court for the Southern District of Illinois (1967–1979)
- Alexander J. Napoli (1929), judge of the U.S. District Court for the Northern District of Illinois (1966–1972)
- Carl J. Nichols (1996), judge of the U.S. District Court for the District of Columbia (2019–present)
- Howard C. Nielson Jr. (1997), judge of the U.S. District Court for the District of Utah (2019–present)
- Martha M. Pacold (2002), judge of the U.S. District Court for the Northern District of Illinois (2019–present)
- Rebecca R. Pallmeyer (1979), chief judge of the U.S. District Court for the Northern District of Illinois (1998–present)
- Barrington D. Parker (1947), judge of the U.S. District Court for the District of Columbia (1969–1993)
- James Benton Parsons (1949), judge of the U.S. District Court for the Northern District of Illinois (1961–1993); also first African-American to serve as a United States federal judge
- Joseph Sam Perry (1927), judge of U.S. District Court for the Northern District of Illinois (1951–1984)
- Casper Platt (1916), judge and formerly chief judge of the U.S. District Court for the Eastern District of Illinois (1949–1965)
- Willis William Ritter (1924), judge and later chief judge of the U.S. District Court for the District of Utah (1950–1978)
- Lee H. Rosenthal (1977), judge and currently chief judge of the U.S. District Court for the Southern District of Texas (1992–present)
- Mary M. Rowland (1988), judge of the U.S. District Court for the Northern District of Illinois (2019–present); also former magistrate judge of the same court (2012–2019)
- Milton Shadur (1949), judge of the U.S. District Court for the Northern District of Illinois (1980–2018)
- Manish S. Shah (1998), judge of the U.S. District Court for the Northern District of Illinois (2014–present)
- Herbert Jay Stern (1961), judge of the U.S. District Court for the District of New Jersey (1973–1987) and judge of the United States Court for Berlin (1979)
- Hubert Louis Will (1937), judge of the U.S. District Court for the Northern District of Illinois (1961–1995)
- George H. Wu (1975), judge of the U.S. District Court for the Central District of California (2007–present)

===== Other federal courts =====
- Arnold R. Baar (1914), judge of the U.S. Tax Court (1954)
- Renato Beghe (1954), judge of the U.S. Tax Court (1991–2003)
- Richard Hertling (1985), judge of the U.S. Court of Federal Claims (2019–present)
- Mark V. Holmes (1983), judge of the U.S. Tax Court (2003–present)
- J. Warren Madden (1914), judge of the United States Court of Claims (1941–1961); also chair of the National Labor Relations Board (1935–1940) and Medal of Freedom recipient (1947)
- Irvin Charles Mollison (1923), judge of the United States Customs Court (1945–1962)
- Richard T. Morrison (1993), judge of the U.S. Tax Court (2008–present)
- Allin H. Pierce (1923), judge of the U.S. Tax Court (1955–1967)
- Stephen S. Schwartz (2008), judge of the U.S. Court of Federal Claims (2020–present)

==== State government ====
===== Governors =====
- Tony Earl (1961), 41st governor of Wisconsin (1983–1987)
- Dwight H. Green (1922), 30th governor of Illinois (1941–1949)
- A. W. Norblad (1902), 19th governor of Oregon (1929–1931)
- Abraham Ribicoff (1933), 80th governor of Connecticut (1955–1961); also 4th Secretary of Health, Education, and Welfare (1961–1962) and U.S. senator (D-Connecticut) (1963–1981)
- Ingram Stainback, 9th governor of Hawaii (1942–1951)
- Matthew E. Welsh (1937), 41st governor of Indiana (1961–1965)

===== State politicians =====
- Miriam Balanoff (1963), member of the Illinois House of Representatives (1979–1983); also judge of the Circuit Court of Cook County, Illinois (1986–2000)
- Paul Berch (1970), member of the New Hampshire House of Representatives (2012–present)
- Jeanne Bodfish, 31st Comptroller of the Treasury of Tennessee (1953–1955)
- Jack E. Bowers, member of the Illinois House of Representatives (1965–1967) and of the Illinois Senate (1977–1983)
- Robert M. Brake, member of the Florida House of Representatives (1966–1967)
- John C. Brooks, North Carolina Commissioner of Labor (1977–1993)
- Allen Busby (1928), member of the Wisconsin State Senate (1936–1972)
- Clarence C. Caldwell (did not graduate), 9th attorney general of South Dakota (1915–1919)
- John E. Cashman, member of the Wisconsin State Senate (1923–1938, 1941–1946)
- John William Chapman (1917), 37th lieutenant governor of Illinois (1953–1961)
- Lycurgus Conner, member of the Illinois House of Representatives (1961–1963)
- Robert E. Coulson (1937), member of the Illinois House of Representatives (1957–1962) and member of the Illinois Senate (1963–1973)
- Richard W. DeKorte (1959), member of the New Jersey General Assembly (1967–1970)
- Peter Diamondstone (1960), co-founder of the Liberty Union Party
- Leif Erickson (1934), chair of the Montana Democratic Party (1956–1958); also Justice of the Montana Supreme Court (1939–1945)
- Thurlow Essington (1908), member of the Illinois Senate (1919–1927)
- Benjamin Michael Flowers (2012), 10th solicitor general of Ohio (2019–2023)
- John A. Gale (1965), 26th secretary of state of Nebraska (2000–2019)
- Don Harmon (1994), 39th president of the Illinois Senate (2021–present) and member of the Illinois Senate (2003–present)
- Mike Hilgers (2004), member of the Nebraska Legislature (2017–present)
- Maria Horn (1993), member of the Connecticut House of Representatives (2019–present)
- Sue Metzger Dickey Hough (1906), member of the Minnesota House of Representatives (1923–1924)
- F. Badger Ives (did not graduate), member of the Wisconsin State Assembly (1899–1914)
- Nathan J. Kaplan, member of the Illinois House of Representatives (1956–1962)
- Alexandra Kasser (2003), member of the Connecticut State Senate (2019–2021)
- Harold A. Katz (1948), member of the Illinois House of Representatives (1965–1982)
- Mary Anne Krupsak (1962), 80th lieutenant governor of New York (1975–1978)
- Dan Liljenquist (2001), member of the Utah State Senate (2009–2011)
- Arthur C. Lueder, Illinois auditor of Public Accounts (1941–1949)
- Rob McKenna (1988), 17th attorney general of Washington (2005–2013)
- George D. Mills (1923), member of the Illinois Senate (1943–1948)
- Jonathan Mitchell (2001), 5th solicitor general of Texas (2010–2015)
- Lewis V. Morgan (1954), member of the Illinois House of Representatives (1963–1970)
- Tracy Katz Muhl (2000), member of the Illinois House of Representatives (2024–present)
- Eric E. Murphy, 9th solicitor general of Ohio (2013–2017); also judge of the U.S. Court of Appeals for the Sixth Circuit
- Chris Nybo, member of the Illinois Senate (2014–2018) and member of the Illinois House of Representatives (2011–2013)
- Myron Orfield (1987), member of the Minnesota Senate (2000–2002) and member of the Minnesota House of Representatives (2000–2002); also professor at the University of Minnesota Law School
- Gertrude Polcar (1938), member of the Ohio House of Representatives (1969–1971)
- James Reilly (1972), member of the Illinois House of Representatives (1976–1978)
- Jesse Ruiz (1995), deputy governor of Illinois for Education (2011–present) and chairman of the Illinois State Board of Education (2004–2011)
- J. Clinton Searle (1913), member of the Illinois House of Representatives (1927–37, 1939–1952)
- Ken Simpler, State Treasurer of Delaware (2015–2019)
- Michele Smith (1979), member of the Chicago City Council (2011–present)
- Zack Stephenson (2010), member of the Minnesota House of Representatives (2019–present)
- Anton D. Strouf (1910), member of the Montana Senate (1920)
- Calvin Sutker (1950), member of the Illinois House of Representatives (1985–1991) and member of the Cook County Board of Commissioners (1994–2002)
- William Tong (2000), 25th attorney general of Connecticut (2019–present) and member of the Connecticut House of Representatives (2007–present)
- A. Andrew Torrence, member of the Illinois House of Representatives (1939–1940)
- Mark Tremmel, member of the Iowa House of Representatives (2001–2003)
- Edward Vrdolyak (1963), member and later president of the Chicago City Council (1971–1987)
- Bill Witt (1976), member of the Oregon House of Representatives (1999–2003)
- Rob Witwer (1996), member of the Colorado House of Representatives (2005–2009)
- Tremaine Wright (1999), member of the New York State Assembly (2017–2021)

===== State judges =====
- Donald G. Alexander, justice of the Maine Supreme Judicial Court (1998–2020)
- Norman Arterburn (1926), justice of the Indiana Supreme Court (1955–1977)
- Miriam Balanoff (1963), judge of the Circuit Court of Cook County, Illinois (1986–2000); also member of the Illinois House of Representatives (1979–1983)
- Thomas A. Balmer (1977), associate justice and formerly chief justice of the Oregon Supreme Court (2001–present)
- Richard Bandstra (1980), judge of the Michigan Court of Appeals (1995–2011); also member of the Michigan House of Representatives (1985–1994)
- Tim Bradbury (1972), judge of the King County Superior Court (1995)
- William H. Bright Jr. (1987), chief judge of the Connecticut Appellate Court (2017–present)
- Daniel Calabretta (2003), judge of the Sacramento County Superior Court (2019–present); current nominee for judge of the U.S. District Court for the Eastern District of California
- William C. Christianson (1920), associate justice of the Minnesota Supreme Court (1946); also judge of the Nuremberg Military Tribunals (1948–1949)
- Charles H. Davis (1931), justice and later chief justice of the Illinois Supreme Court (1955–1960) and justice and two-time presiding justice of the Illinois Appellate Court (1964–1970)
- Leif Erickson (1934), justice of the Montana Supreme Court (1939–1945); also chair of the Montana Democratic Party (1956–1958)
- Hugo Friend (1908), judge of the Circuit Court of Cook County, Illinois (1920–1966)
- Christopher L. Garrett (2000), associate justice of the Oregon Supreme Court (2019–present)
- Sandra Slack Glover (1997), nominee for associate justice of the Connecticut Supreme Court
- Luther Marcellus Goddard (1864), justice of the Colorado Supreme Court (1891–1901, 1905–1909)
- E. Harold Hallows (1930), justice and later chief justice of the Wisconsin Supreme Court (1958–1974)
- Harry B. Hershey (1911), justice of the Illinois Supreme Court (1951–1966)
- Constandinos Himonas (1989), associate justice of the Utah Supreme Court (2015–present)
- Robert L. Hunter, presiding judge of the Divorce Division of the Circuit Court of Cook County, Illinois (1962–1979) and 1951 Republican nominee for mayor of Chicago
- Warren Jones (1968), justice of the Idaho Supreme Court (2007–2017)
- George M. Joseph (1955), chief judge of the Oregon Court of Appeals (1981–1992)
- Scott L. Kafker (1985), associate justice of the Massachusetts Supreme Judicial Court (2017–present) and of the Massachusetts Appeals Court (2001–2017)
- Thomas E. Kluczynski (1927), justice of the Illinois Supreme Court (1966–1976, 1978–1980)
- Thomas Rex Lee (1991), associate justice of the Utah Supreme Court (2010–present)
- Raymond B. Lucas (1915), justice of the Supreme Court of Missouri (1938)
- David Minge (1967), judge of the Minnesota Court of Appeals (2002–2012); also member of the U.S. Representative (D-Minnesota) (1993–2001)
- Edward Nakamura (1951), justice of the Supreme Court of Hawaii (1980–1989)
- Lisa Neubauer (1987), judge and currently chief judge of the Wisconsin Court of Appeals (2007–present)
- Jack O'Malley (1981), Judge on the second district of the Illinois Appellate Court (2000–2010)
- Susan Phillips Read (1972), judge of the New York Court of Appeals (2003–2015)
- Mark E. Recktenwald (1986), chief justice of the Supreme Court of Hawaii (2010–present)
- Philip L. Rice (1916), justice of the Territorial Supreme Court of Hawaii (1955–1959)
- Frank Richman (1908), justice of the Indiana Supreme Court (1941–1947), judge at the Nuremberg trials
- John W. Rogers Sr. (1948), former Cook County, Illinois juvenile court judge, and U.S. Air Force officer with the Tuskegee Airmen
- George Rossman (1910), associate justice and later chief justice of the Oregon Supreme Court (1927–1965)
- Walter V. Schaefer, justice of the Illinois Supreme Court (1951–1976)
- Hardress Nathaniel Swaim (1916), justice of the Indiana Supreme Court (1939–1945); also judge of the U.S. Court of Appeals for the Seventh Circuit (1950–1957)
- Paul Thissen (1992), associate justice of the Minnesota Supreme Court (2018–present); also 59th speaker of the Minnesota House of Representatives (2013–2015)
- Wilfred Tsukiyama, justice and later chief justice of the Supreme Court of Hawaii (1959–1965)
- Lester A. Wade (1917), justice and later chief justice of the Utah Supreme Court (1943–1966)
- Dale Wainwright (1988), associate justice of the Supreme Court of Texas (2003–2012)
- William Sylvester White (1937), justice of the Illinois Appellate Court (1980–1991)

===== City government =====
- Andy Berke (1994), 73rd mayor of Chattanooga (2013–present) and member of the Tennessee Senate (2007–2012)
- Solomon Gutstein (1956), first ordained rabbi to serve as alderman on the Chicago City Council (1975–1979) and leading practitioner on Illinois real estate law
- Hugh Hallman (1988), mayor of Tempe, Arizona (2004–2012)
- David H. Hoffman (1995), inspector-general of Chicago (2005–2009), partner of Sidley Austin and lecturer at the law school
- Susheela Jayapal (1988), Multnomah County commissioner (2019–present)
- Brooke Jenkins (2010), 30th district attorney of San Francisco (2022–present)
- Lori Lightfoot (1989), 47th mayor of Chicago (2019–2023)
- Mary V. Mochary (1967), 9th mayor of Montclair (1980–1984)
- Watkins Overton (1921), 42nd and longest-serving mayor of Memphis, Tennessee (1928–1939)
- James P. Pope (1909), 35th mayor of Boise, Idaho (1929–1933); also U.S. senator (D-Idaho) (1933–1939)
- Carol Ruth Silver (1964), member of San Francisco Board of Supervisors (1978–1980); also civil rights activist and Freedom Rider

==== U.S. diplomatic figures ====
- Donald C. Bergus (1940), U.S. ambassador to Sudan (1977–1980)
- Richard Wayne Bogosian (1962), U.S. ambassador to Niger (1985–1988)and U.S. ambassador to Chad (1990–1993)
- Carol Moseley Braun (1972), U.S. ambassador to New Zealand (1999–2001) and U.S. ambassador to Samoa (2000–2001); also U.S. senator (D-Illinois) (1993–1999)
- John B. Emerson (1978), U.S. ambassador to Germany (2013–2017)
- Mary Ann Glendon (J.D. 1961, M.C.L 1963), U.S. ambassador to the Holy See (2008–2009); also professor at Harvard Law School
- James Hormel (1958), 17th U.S. ambassador to Luxembourg (1998–2001)

==== Other U.S. political figures ====
- Mala Adiga (2002), policy director to the Second Lady of the U.S., Jill Biden (2021–present)
- Cyrus Amir-Mokri (1995), assistant secretary for Financial Institutions at the U.S. Treasury Department (2011–2014); also general counsel and managing director at JPMorgan Chase
- Greg Andres, assistant special counsel for Russian interference in 2016 United States elections (2017); also partner at Davis Polk & Wardwell
- Brian P. Brooks, acting comptroller of the Currency (2020–present)
- Lisa Brown (1986), White House staff secretary (2009–2011), also chief legal counsel to Georgetown University (2013–present)
- William Holmes Brown (1954), parliamentarian of the U.S. House of Representatives (1974–1994)
- Mary Ellen Callahan (1997), chief privacy officer and chief Freedom of Information Act officer of the U.S. Department of Homeland Security (2009–2012)
- Benton J. Campbell (1991), U.S. attorney for the Eastern District of New York (2007–2010); also partner of Latham & Watkins
- Henry P. Chandler (1906), director of the Administrative Office of the United States Courts (1939–1956)
- Benjamin V. Cohen (1915), advisor and member of the administrations of Presidents Franklin D. Roosevelt and Harry S. Truman
- James Cole Jr. (1995), acting Deputy Secretary of Education (2016–2017)
- D. Leigh Colvin, chairman of the Prohibition Party (1926–1932)
- Sean J. Cooksey (2014), commissioner of the Federal Election Commission (2020–present)
- Richard Cordray (1986), 1st director of the Consumer Financial Protection Bureau (2012–2017); also 49th attorney general of Ohio (2009–2011), 46th Treasurer of Ohio (2007–2009) and solicitor general of Oio (1993–1995)
- Roger C. Cramton (1955), chairman of the Administrative Conference of the United States (1970–1972) and assistant U.S. attorney general (1972–1973); also dean of Cornell Law School (1973–1980)
- Kenneth W. Dam (1957), 8th U.S. deputy secretary of state (1982–1985); also U.S. deputy secretary of the Treasury (2001–2003), current senior fellow of the Brookings Institution and the Max Pam Professor Emeritus of American & Foreign Law at the law school
- Ashley Deeks (1998), associate White House Counsel and deputy legal adviser to U.S. National Security Council (2021–present); also professor at University of Virginia School of Law
- Isaiah Sol Dorfman (1931), agent of the Office of Strategic Services and labor lawyer
- Jon Dudas, Director of the U.S. Patent and Trademark Office (2004–2009)
- Gary Edson (1982), Deputy National Security Advisor (2001–2004)
- Troy Eid (1991), U.S. attorney for the District of Colorado (2006–2009)
- Curtis E. Gannon (1998), principal deputy assistant attorney general for the Office of Legal Counsel (2017–2020)
- Jessica Hertz (2007), White House staff secretary (2021–present)
- Rachael A. Honig (1999), acting United States attorney for the District of New Jersey (2018–present)
- John Alvin Johnson (1940), general counsel of the Air Force (1952–1958) and general counsel of NASA (1958–1963)
- David A. Kessler (1977), co-chair of the COVID-19 Advisory Board (2020–present); 17th Commissioner of Food and Drugs (1990–1997); dean of the Yale School of Medicine (1997–2003) and dean of the University of California, San Francisco Medical School (2003–2007)
- Wan J. Kim (1993), assistant U.S. attorney general for the Civil Rights Division in the Department of Justice (2005–2007)
- David Ladd (1953), 10th register of Copyrights (1980–1985) and U.S. Commissioner of Patents (1961–1963)
- Jewel Lafontant (1946), deputy U.S. solicitor general (1973–1975) and representative to the General Assembly of the United Nations (1972); also first African-American woman to graduate from the law school
- Morris I. Leibman (1933), civilian aide-at-large to the U.S. secretary of the Army (1964–1979), recipient of Presidential Medal of Freedom (1981), and partner of Sidley Austin
- Daniel Levin (1953), Deputy assistant attorney general for the Office of Legal Counsel (2004–2005)
- James A. Lewis (1966), U.S. attorney for the Central District of Illinois (2010–2016)
- Sidney I. Lezak (1949), U.S. attorney for the District of Oregon (1961–1982)
- William P. MacCracken Jr. (1911), first U.S. assistant secretary of Commerce for Aeronautics (1926–1942)
- Roswell Magill (1920), U.S. under secretary of the Treasury (1937–1938); chief attorney in the U.S. Treasury Department (1923–1927)
- Maureen Mahoney (1978), deputy U.S. solicitor general (1991–1992); also partner of Latham & Watkins
- William M. Marutani (1953), commissioner on the Commission on Wartime Relocation and Internment of Civilians (1980–1983)
- Scott Milne Matheson Sr., U.S. attorney for the District of Utah (1949–1953)
- Kevin McAleenan (1998), commissioner of U.S. Customs and Border Protection (2017–2019); also United States secretary of Homeland Security (2019)
- George B. McKibbin (1913), Illinois state and U.S. federal government appointee; campaign manager; 1943 Republican nominee for mayor of Chicago
- Richard H. Newhouse Jr., member of the Illinois Senate (1967–1991)
- Sheila Nix (1989), chief of staff to the Second Lady of the U.S., Jill Biden (2013–2017)
- Leif Olson (2001), U.S. attorney for the Northern District of Iowa (2025–present)
- Ajit Pai (1997), chairman of the Federal Communications Commission (2017–2021)
- Margaret Peterlin (2000), chief of staff to the U.S. Secretary of State, Rex Tillerson (2017–2018); also senior vice president of global external and public affairs at AT&T (2018–present)
- Mythili Raman (1994), acting assistant attorney general for the U.S. Department of Justice's Criminal Division (2013–2014); partner of Covington & Burling
- Preston Richards, assistant solicitor at the United States Department of State
- Kyle Sampson (1996), chief of staff and counselor of U.S. Attorney General Alberto Gonzales (2005–2007)
- James Santelle (1993), U.S. attorney for the Eastern District of Wisconsin (2010–2015)
- Hal S. Scott (1972), director of the Committee on Capital Markets Regulation; also governor of the American Stock Exchange and professor at Harvard Law School (1975–present)
- Nirav D. Shah (2007), principal deputy director of the CDC
- Melanie Sloan (1991), founder and executive director of Citizens for Responsibility and Ethics in Washington and counsel for the House Judiciary Committee
- Mary L. Smith (1991), principal deputy director and acting agency head of the Indian Health Service (2015–2017)
- Cheryl Stanton (1997), administrator of the Wage and Hour Division at the U.S. Department of Labor (2019–2021)
- Karl R. Thompson (2000), assistant attorney general for the Office of Legal Counsel (2014–2017)
- Jeff Wall (2003), acting U.S. solicitor general (2020–2021)
- Fleet White (2022), Assistant Secretary of State for Political-Military Affairs (2026–present)
- J. Ernest Wilkins Sr., assistant secretary of labor (1954–1958)

=== Non-United States government ===
==== Non-United States political figures ====
- Herman De Croo (1962), president of the Belgian Chamber of Representatives (1999–2007) and longest-serving member of the Belgian Federal Parliament (1991–present)
- Mei Ju-ao (1928), chief of the Chinese Ministry of Justice (1948–1949); also member of the International Military Tribunal for the Far East (1946–1948)
- Alexander Krasnoshchyokov (1912), head of the Far Eastern Republic (1920–1921)
- David Libai (J.S.D. 1968), member of the Knesset (1984–1999) and Israeli Minister of Justice (1992–1996)
- Geoffrey Palmer (1967), 33rd prime minister of New Zealand (1989–1990)
- Uriel Reichman (J.S.D. 1975), member of the Knesset (2006); also dean of the Tel Aviv University law faculty (1985–1990) and founder and president of Interdisciplinary Center Herzliya (1994–present)
- Shimon Shetreet (D.C.L. 1973), member of the Knesset (1988–1996)
- Hans Jürgen Wildberg (LL.M. 1975), district administrator of Stormarn in Schleswig-Holstein, Germany (1990–1998)
- Alain Zenner (M.C.L. 1969), member of Parliament of the Brussels-Capital Region (1991–present) and senator (1999–2007)

==== Non-United States judicial figures ====
- Shimon Agranat (1929), president of the Supreme Court of Israel (1965–1976)
- Kwamena Bentsi-Enchill, justice of the Supreme Court of Ghana (1971–1972)
- Robert Carswell, Baron Carswell (1958), Lord of Appeal in Ordinary (2004–2009), Lord Chief Justice of Northern Ireland (1997–2004), Lord Justice of Appeal of the Supreme Court of Judicature of Northern Ireland (1993–1997)
- Lord Thomas of Cwmgiedd (1970), Lord Chief Justice of England and Wales (2013–2017)

=== Notable attorneys ===
- Frederick B. Abramson (1959), president of the District of Columbia Bar (1985–1986)
- Katherine L. Adams (1990), general counsel of Apple Inc. (2017–present)
- Robert Barnett (1971), partner of Williams & Connolly
- Laird Bell, philanthropist, attorney and co-founder of Bell, Boyd & Lloyd LLP, now K&L Gates
- Steve Berman (1980), leading class actions attorney and managing partner of Hagens Berman Sobol Shapiro
- Frank Cicero Jr. (1965), partner of Kirkland & Ellis
- Patrick M. Collins, partner of King & Spalding
- Roberta Cooper Ramo (1967), first female president of the American Law Institute (1995–1996) and first female president of the American Bar Association (2008–2017)
- Earl B. Dickerson (1920), prominent attorney and community activist and first African-American graduate of the law school
- Howard Ellis (J.D. 1914, LL.D. 1915), name partner of Kirkland & Ellis
- Bruce Ennis (1965), founder of the law firm Ennis, Friedman, Bersoff & Ewing, which merged into Jenner & Block
- Ted Frank (1994), leading class actions attorney and founder and president of the Center for Class Action Fairness
- Edward de Grazia (1951), attorney involved in numerous high-profile cases of literary and artistic censorship in the 1960s; also founding member of faculty at the Benjamin N. Cardozo School of Law
- Paul Grewal (1996), chief legal officer at Coinbase (2020–present); magistrate judge of the U.S. District Court for the Northern District of California (2010–2016)
- Chris Hansen, civil rights attorney, notable for litigating U.S. Supreme Court cases AMP v. Myriad Genetics and ACLU v. Reno
- Ines Catron Hoffmann (1928), attorney and city official of Springfield, Illinois
- Ho Hsiao-yuan, Chinese attorney and professor at National Taipei University
- Gregory Jacob (1999), partner of O'Melveny & Myers
- Brooke Jenkins (2006), District Attorney of San Francisco (2022–present)
- Lillian Johnson (1975), civil justice advocate and director of National Legal Aid & Defender Association
- Leon L. Lewis (1913), inaugural national secretary of the Anti-Defamation League
- Carl J. Mayer, founder of the Mayer Law Group LLC
- Bernard D. Meltzer (1937), prosecutor at the Nuremberg trials and a drafter of the U.N. Charter; also professor at the law school and leading scholar of labor law
- Marla Messing (1986), attorney, sports executive and CEO of organising committee of the 1999 FIFA Women's World Cup
- Susan M. Moss (1994), partner of Chemtob Moss Forman & Beyda LLP
- Francis Neate (1963), president of the International Bar Association (2005–2006); also English cricketer (1958–1979)
- Frederick M. Nicholas (1952), attorney specializing in real estate and property development
- Roderick A. Palmore (1977), general counsel and executive vice-president of Sara Lee Corporation (1996–2008) and of General Mills (2008–present)
- Matthew Parish (LL.M. 2004, J.S.D. 2007), managing partner of Gentium Law Group
- Gerald Ratner (1937), co-founder of Gould & Ratner
- Eugene Scalia (1990), partner of Gibson, Dunn & Crutcher
- Harry Schneider (1979), partner of Perkins Coie
- William Spade (1990), noted criminal defense attorney in Philadelphia, Pennsylvania
- Fay Stender (1956), attorney and representative of Black Panther leader Huey Newton, the Soledad Brothers and Black Guerrilla Family founder George Jackson
- Jean Stoffregen (did not graduate), racial equality lawyer for the Fellowship of Reconciliation
- Ted Ullyot (1994), partner of Andreessen Horowitz and former general counsel of Facebook
- Sam Yasgur (1966), assistant district attorney of New York and leading prosecutor

== Academia ==
=== University presidents ===
- Morris B. Abram (1940), president of Brandeis University (1968–1970)
- William Birenbaum (1946), president of Antioch College (1976–1985)
- King Virgil Cheek (1969), president of Shaw University (1969–1971) and of Morgan State University (1971–1974)
- Arland F. Christ-Janer (1952), president of Cornell College (1962–1967), of Boston University (1967–1970), of New College of Florida (1973–1975), of Stephens College (1975–1983), and of the Ringling School of Art and Design (1984–1996)
- Lewis Collens (1966), president of Illinois Institute of Technology (1990–2007) and dean of Chicago-Kent College of Law (1974–1990)
- Christopher L. Eisgruber (1988), president of Princeton University (2013–present)
- Rex E. Lee (1963), president of Brigham Young University (1989–1995); also 37th U.S. solicitor general (1981–1985)
- Dallin H. Oaks (1957), president of Brigham Young University (1971–1980); also president of the Church of Jesus Christ of Latter-day Saints (2025–present)
- Barbara Snyder (1980), president of Case Western Reserve University (2007–present) and president of Association of American Universities (2020–present)

=== Deans ===
- Alfred C. Aman, Jr. (1970), dean of Indiana University School of Law (1991–2002) and Suffolk University Law School (2007–2009)
- Alfred Avins (J.S.D. 1962), dean and co-founder of the Delaware Law School (1971–1974)
- Craig M. Boise (1994), dean of Cleveland-Marshall College of Law (2011–2016) and of Syracuse University College of Law (2016–present)
- Roger C. Cramton (1955), dean of Cornell Law School (1973–1980); also chairman of the Administrative Conference of the United States (1970–1972) and assistant U.S. attorney general (1972–1973)
- John C. Eastman (1995), dean of the Chapman University School of Law (2007–2010)
- Ward Farnsworth (1994), dean of University of Texas School of Law (2012–present)
- William Ray Forrester (1935), dean of Vanderbilt University Law School (1949–1952), Tulane University Law School (1952–1963) and Cornell Law School (1963–1973)
- Jim Huffman (1972), dean of Lewis & Clark Law School (1994–2006) and the Republican nominee in the 2010 U.S. Senate election in Oregon
- Herma Hill Kay (1959), dean of UC Berkeley School of Law (1992–2000)
- David A. Kessler (1977), dean of the Yale School of Medicine (1997–2003) and the University of California, San Francisco Medical School (2003–2007); also co-chair of the COVID-19 Advisory Board (2020–present) and 17th Commissioner of Food and Drugs (1990–1997)
- Larry Kramer (1984), dean of Stanford Law School (2004–2012); also president of the Hewlett Foundation
- William H. Leary (1908), dean of the University of Utah College of Law (1915–1950)
- Henry Manne (1952), dean emeritus of the George Mason University School of Law (1986–1996)
- Robert K. Rasmussen (1985), dean of the Gould School of Law at the University of Southern California (2007–2015)
- Uriel Reichman (J.S.D. 1975), dean of the Tel Aviv University law faculty (1985–1990) and founder and president of Interdisciplinary Center Herzliya (1994–present); also member of the Knesset (2006)
- Peter B. Rutledge (1996), dean of University of Georgia School of Law (2015–present)
- D. Gordon Smith (1990), dean of the J. Reuben Clark Law School at Brigham Young University (2016–present)
- Geoffrey R. Stone (1971), dean (1987–1994) and interim dean (2015) of the law school; Edward H. Levi Distinguished Service Professor of Law at the law school; leading First Amendment scholar
- Julian Waterman (1923), founder and inaugural dean of the University of Arkansas School of Law (1926–1943) and vice president of the University of Arkansas (1937–1943)

=== Professors ===
==== Legal ====
- Norman Abrams (1955), professor emeritus at the UCLA School of Law
- Barry Adler (1985), professor at the New York University School of Law and expert on bankruptcy law
- George Anastaplo (1951), professor at Loyola University Chicago School of Law
- Carlton Bailey (1972), professor at the University of Arkansas School of Law
- Avi Bell (1993), professor at the University of San Diego and at Bar-Ilan University and property law scholar
- Thomas Berg, professor at the University of St. Thomas
- Vincent Blasi (1967), professor at Columbia Law School and First Amendment scholar and historian
- Walter J. Blum (1941), professor at the law school and pre-eminent figure in tax law
- Dale Carpenter (1959), professor at SMU Dedman School of Law
- Anthony J. Casey (2002), professor at the law school and expert on business law and bankruptcy law
- Marvin Chirelstein (1953), professor at Columbia Law School and at Yale Law School
- Robert N. Clinton (1971), professor at the Sandra Day O'Connor College of Law at Arizona State University
- Dennis Crouch (2003), associate professor at the University of Missouri School of Law
- Martha Davis (1983), professor at Northeastern University
- John F. Duffy, professor at the University of Virginia School of Law
- Andreas Engert (LL.M. 2000), professor at the Free University of Berlin
- Martha Field (1968), professor at Harvard Law School
- Martha Albertson Fineman (1975), professor at Emory University School of Law, scholar of feminist legal theory and critical legal theory, and founder and director of the Feminism and Legal Theory Project
- James Fleissner (1986), professor at the Walter F. George School of Law of Mercer University
- George P. Fletcher (1964), professor at Columbia Law School
- James Friedman, professor at the University of Maine School of Law
- Lawrence M. Friedman (J.D. 1951, LL.M. 1953), professor at Stanford Law School and scholar on American legal history
- Scott Gaille (1995), lecturer at the law school (2013–present) and energy law scholar
- Marc Galanter, professor emeritus at University of Wisconsin School of Law and scholar on law and society
- Stephen Gard (LL.M. 1975), professor at Cleveland-Marshall College of Law
- Roberto Gargarella (LL.M. 1992, J.S.D. 1993), professor at the University of Buenos Aires
- Michael Gerhardt (1982), professor at the UNC School of Law, Special Counsel to the Senate Judiciary Committee for the nominations of Sonia Sotomayor (2009), Elena Kagan (2010), and Neil Gorsuch (2017) to the U.S. Supreme Court
- Jacob Gersen (2004), professor at Harvard Law School
- Mary Ann Glendon (J.D. 1961, M.C.L 1963), professor at Harvard Law School; also U.S. Ambassador to the Holy See (2008–2009)
- Kent Greenfield (1992), professor at the Boston College Law School
- Brigitte Haar (1992), professor at Goethe University Frankfurt
- Robert Hamilton (1955), Minerva House Drysdale Regents Chair in Law at the University of Texas School of Law
- Angela P. Harris (1986), professor at UC Davis School of Law and scholar on critical race theory, feminist legal theory, and criminal law
- John N. Hazard (J.S.D. 1939), professor at Columbia University and scholar on Soviet law
- Paul J. Heald, professor at the University of Illinois College of Law; also novelist
- Walter Hellerstein (1970), professor at University of Georgia School of Law
- M. Todd Henderson (1998), Michael J. Marks Professor of Law at the law school and expert on corporate law and securities regulation; also novelist
- Gail Heriot (1981), professor at the University of San Diego School of Law
- William H. J. Hubbard (2000), professor at the law school and expert on civil procedure and law and economics
- Dennis J. Hutchinson (did not graduate), professor at the College of the University of Chicago, senior lecturer at the law school, and editor of the Supreme Court Review
- Zensuke Ishimura (M.C.L. 1964), professor at Tokyo Metropolitan University
- James B. Jacobs (1973), professor at New York University School of Law
- Renee Knake Jefferson (1999), professor and member of the board of trustees at Michigan State University
- Phillip E. Johnson (1965), professor at UC Berkeley School of Law and founder of the intelligent design movement
- Quintin Johnstone (1938), professor at Yale Law School and New York Law School
- Timothy Jost (1975), professor at Washington and Lee University School of Law and expert on American health law and policy
- Harry Kalven, Harry A. Bigelow Professor of Law at the law school and First Amendment scholar
- Michael S. Kang (1999), professor at Northwestern University Pritzker School of Law
- Sonia Katyal (1998), Distinguished Haas Chair at UC Berkeley School of Law
- Leo Katz (1982), professor at the University of Pennsylvania Law School
- Michael Knoll (1984), professor at the University of Pennsylvania Law School
- Eugene Kontorovich (2001), professor at the Antonin Scalia Law School
- Christoph Kumpan (LL.M. 2002), professor at Bucerius Law School
- Thilo Kuntz (LL.M. 2007), professor at Bucerius Law School
- Holning Lau, professor at the University of North Carolina School of Law
- Douglas Laycock (1973), professor at the University of Virginia School of Law and scholar on the law of religious liberty and on remedies
- Hans G. Leser (M.C.L. 1959), professor at University of Marburg and German scholar of private law
- Wesley Liebeler (1957), professor at the University of California and at the Antonin Scalia Law School
- James Lindgren (1977), professor at the Northwestern University Pritzker School of Law
- Tracey Meares (1991), professor at Yale Law School and previously at the Law School; first African-American woman to be granted tenure at both law schools
- Bernard D. Meltzer (1937), leading scholar of labor law and professor at the law school; also prosecutor at the Nuremberg trials and a drafter of the U.N. Charter
- Thomas W. Merrill (1977), professor at Columbia Law School and leading scholar of constitutional law and administrative law
- William R. Ming (1933), professor at the law school and at Howard University
- Edward R. Morrison (2000), professor at Columbia Law School and leading scholar of bankruptcy and law and economics
- Daniel L. Nagin (1996), clinical professor at Harvard Law School
- Herman Oliphant (1914), professor at the law school and at Columbia Law School, and leading figure in the legal realism movement
- Myron Orfield (1987), professor at the University of Minnesota Law School; also member of the Minnesota Senate (2000–2002) and member of the Minnesota House of Representatives (2000–2002)
- Sol Picciotto, emeritus professor at Lancaster University
- Randal C. Picker (1985), James Parker Hall Distinguished Service Professor of Law at the law school and expert in antitrust law and intellectual property law
- George L. Priest, professor at Yale Law School
- Lucy Reed (1977), director of the Centre for International Law at the National University of Singapore
- Larry Ribstein (1972), professor at George Mason University School of Law and corporate law scholar
- Carol M. Rose (1977), professor at Yale Law School and at the James E. Rogers College of Law at the University of Arizona and property law scholar
- Joseph Sax (1959), professor at UC Berkeley School of Law and at the University of Michigan Law School, environmental law scholar, and developer of the public trust doctrine
- Peter Schlechtriem (M.C.L. 1965), professor at the University of Heidelberg and German legal scholar
- Suzanna Sherry (1979), professor at Vanderbilt University Law School and constitutional law scholar
- Bernard Siegan (1949), professor at the University of San Diego School of Law and libertarian legal theorist
- Robert Sitkoff (1999), professor at Harvard Law School and scholar on trusts and estates
- Barry Sullivan (1974), professor at Loyola University Chicago School of Law
- Franita Tolson (2005), professor at the USC Gould School of Law
- William Twining (1958), professor at University College London and scholar on jurisprudence
- Walter Van Gerven (LL.M. 1960), prominent Belgian lawyer and advocate-general at the European Court of Justice (1988–1994)
- David Vaver (1971), professor at Osgoode Hall Law School and at the University of Oxford
- Gerhard Wagner (LL.M. 1995), professor at the Humboldt University of Berlin
- Stephen Wizner (1963), clinical professor at Yale Law School
- A. N. Yiannopoulos (M.C.L. 1954), professor at Tulane University Law School and founder of the Civil Law Commentaries
- Franklin Zimring (1967), professor at UC Berkeley School of Law and scholar on the criminal justice system

==== Non-legal ====
- Nancy Feldman (1946), professor of sociology at the University of Tulsa; also civil rights activist
- Ernst Fraenkel (1941), German political scientist and one of the founding fathers of German political science after World War II
- Cynthia Fuchs Epstein (did not graduate), professor of sociology at the Graduate Center, CUNY
- Jack Katz (1969), professor of sociology at the University of California, Los Angeles
- Jacob T. Levy (LL.M. 2005), professor of political theory at McGill University
- David L. Paulsen (1964), professor of philosophy at Brigham Young University
- Lorinda Perry, head of political and social sciences department at Rockford College (1914–1916) and professor at University of Illinois (1916–1919)
- Robert Redfield (1917), professor at the University of Chicago, anthropologist and ethnolinguist
- Lawrence Rosen (1974), professor at Princeton University and anthropologist
- Ernest Samuels (1926), professor of English at Northwestern University; also biographer and winner of Pulitzer Prize for Biography or Autobiography (1965)
- Winnifred F. Sullivan (1976), professor of religious studies at Indiana University Bloomington

== Business and non-profit ==
- Peter Altabef (1983), president, CEO, and chairman of Unisys
- Michael Alter, president of the Alter Group and principal owner and chairman of WNBA team Chicago Sky (2005–present)
- Cyrus Amir-Mokri (1995), general counsel and managing director at JPMorgan Chase; also Assistant Secretary for Financial Institutions at the U.S. Treasury Department (2011–2014)
- Jeffrey Anderson (1992), executive vice president of Game Show Network (2017–present)
- Maggie Anderson (1998), CEO and co-founder of the Empowerment Experiment; also civil rights activist
- J. Calvin Brown, 70th president of the American Society of Mechanical Engineers (1951–1952)
- Debra Cafaro (1982), chairman and CEO of Ventas, Inc. (1999–present)
- Bradley M. Campbell (1986), president of Conservation Law Foundation
- Michael J. Cavanagh (1993), president of Comcast
- Norton Clapp (1929), president and chairman of Weyerhaeuser (1960–1970) and president of Boy Scouts of America (1971–1973)
- Christopher DeMuth (1973), distinguished fellow at the Hudson Institute and president of the American Enterprise Institute (1986–2008)
- Daniel L. Doctoroff (1984), CEO and president of Bloomberg L.P. (2008–2014) and co-founder and CEO of Sidewalk Labs (2015–present)
- Daniel Fischel (1977), chairman and president of Compass Lexecon; also Lee and Brena Freeman Professor Emeritus of Law and Business and senior lecturer at the law school
- James Goodale (1958), vice-president, general counsel and vice-chairman for The New York Times
- Gary Haugen (1991), founder, CEO, and former president of International Justice Mission
- Gene Healy (1999), vice-president of the Cato Institute and contributing editor to Liberty magazine
- Wayne Hsiung (2006), co-founder of animal rights network Direct Action Everywhere
- Cary Kochman (1990), co-head of Global Mergers and Acquisitions Group at Citigroup
- Peter Kurer (LL.M. 1976), chairman of UBS (2008–2009) and of Sunrise Communications AG (2016–2020)
- Luis Kutner (1927), co-founder of Amnesty International and inventor of the living will
- Ralph Neas (1971), executive director of the Leadership Conference on Civil and Human Rights, president and CEO of People For the American Way, president and CEO of the National Coalition on Health Care, and president and CEO of the Generic Pharmaceutical Association
- Robert Peach (did not graduate), founder of Mohawk Airlines
- David Wendell Phillips (1988), angel investor in Silicon Valley, CEO of Crunch Music and CEO and founder of NaturalPath Media
- Matthew Prince (2000), co-founder and CEO of Cloudflare
- Donald Pritzker (1959), entrepreneur and president of Hyatt Hotels Corporation and member of the Pritzker family
- Nicholas J. Pritzker (1974), chairman and CEO of the Hyatt Development Corporation
- Thomas Pritzker (1978), executive chairman of Hyatt Hotels Corporation
- Marcus Raskin (1957), co-founder of the Institute for Policy Studies; also professor at George Washington University
- Andrew M. Rosenfield (1978), CEO and managing partner of TGG Group and managing partner of Guggenheim Partners
- David M. Rubenstein (1973), billionaire and founder of the Carlyle Group
- David O. Sacks (1998), founding COO and product leader at PayPal, founder and CEO of Yammer, and founder and partner of Craft Ventures (2017–present)
- Adam Silver (1988), 5th commissioner of the National Basketball Association (2014–present)
- James A. Squires (1992), president and CEO of Norfolk Southern Railway (2013–present)
- Paul Toback, CEO and chairman of Bally Total Fitness (2002–2006)
- Gordon Tullock (1947), professor of law at George Mason University School of Law and leading scholar of law and public choice theory
- Bradley Tusk (1999), founder and CEO of Tusk Holdings; also campaign manager for New York City Mayor Michael Bloomberg's successful 2009 re-election bid, deputy governor of Illinois (2003–2009), and communications director for U.S. Senator Chuck Schumer (2000–2002)
- Joseph T. Zoline, founder and developer of Telluride Ski Resort
- Barry Zubrow (1980), former chief administrative officer of Goldman Sachs, former chief risk officer of JPMorgan Chase and Darelyn A. & Richard C. Reed Lecturer in Law at the law school

== Writing ==
- Mitchell Dawson (1913), writer and poet
- Julian Dibbell (2014), author on social systems in online communities, and technology journalist
- Larry Downes (1993), author on business strategies and information technology, and internet industry analyst
- Steve Fiffer (1976), author of Three Quarters, Two Dimes, and a Nickel and Guggenheim Fellow
- David Fromkin (1953), author of A Peace to End All Peace; also professor of history and international relations at Boston University
- Alan Gordon (1984), author of historical mysteries
- Claire Hartfield (1982), author of history-inspired novels and winner of Coretta Scott King Award (2019)
- Gini Hartzmark, author of thriller novels
- Linda Hirshman (1969), author on women's rights
- Anna Ivey (1997), author and graduate schools admission counselor
- Ernest Samuels (1926), biographer and winner of Pulitzer Prize for Biography or Autobiography (1965); also professor of English at Northwestern University
- Spencer Short (2007), poet; also attorney at Skadden, Arps, Slate, Meagher & Flom
- Studs Terkel (1934), author and winner of Pulitzer Prize for General Nonfiction (1985)
- James Thayer (1974), author of thriller novels

== Media and journalism ==
- Jan Crawford (1993), political correspondent and chief legal correspondent for CBS News and commentator on the U.S. Supreme Court
- Josh Hammer (2016), senior editor-at-large and podcast host for Newsweek
- Seymour Hersh (did not graduate), journalist, winner of Pulitzer Prize for International Reporting (1970), of the National Magazine Award (2004–2005), of the Orwell Award (2004), and of the George Polk Award (1969, 1973–1974, and 1981)
- Harvey Levin (1975), founder of TMZ
- Nell Minow (1977), film critic and corporate governance expert
- Mary Nissenson (1977), journalist (1982–1985) for NBC News and reporter for WBBM-TV in Chicago (1987–1988); also the first female president of the law students' association at the law school
- Andrew Patner (did not graduate), journalist for The Wall Street Journal and the Chicago Sun-Times
- William Schaap (1964), co-founder of CovertAction Quarterly

== Art, music, and film ==
- James Steven Ginsburg (did not graduate), music producer, founder and president of Cedille Records, and son of U.S. Supreme Court Justice Ruth Bader Ginsburg
- Eric Gurry (1992), actor, best known for his roles in such films and plays as Bad Boys, Author! Author! and The Floating Light Bulb
- Jessica J. Rowlands (2017), British screenwriter and director
- Judith Weinshall Liberman (1954), artist and creator of the Holocaust Wall Hangings
- J. Louis von der Mehden (1927), cellist, conductor and composer of classical music
- Miles Mogulescu (1984), film producer, including of Union Maids and Montana
- Gabrielle Rolin (1960), Belgian film critic and novelist

== Activism ==
- Morris B. Abram (1940), civil rights activist and attorney; also president of Brandeis University (1968–1970)
- Maggie Anderson (1998), activist and CEO and co-founder of the Empowerment Experiment
- Sophonisba Breckinridge (1904), activist, Progressive Era social reformer, and the first woman to graduate from the law school
- Earl B. Dickerson (1920), prominent attorney and community activist and first African-American graduate of the law school
- Nancy Feldman (1946), civil rights activist; also professor of sociology at the University of Tulsa
- Irene McCoy Gaines (1918), civil rights activist and anti-segregation campaigner
- Truman Gibson (1935), civil rights activist and influential boxing promoter
- Staughton Lynd (1976), prominent civil rights activist; also professor at Yale University
- Carol Ruth Silver (1964), civil rights activist and Freedom Rider; also member of San Francisco Board of Supervisors (1978–1980)

== Sport ==
- Eric Friedler (1983), professional tennis player (1976–1980)
- Courtney Hall (2003), professional football player for the San Diego Chargers (1989–1996)
- Brooks Johnson, track athlete and coach and gold medallist at the 1963 Pan American Games
- Milton McManaway, college football player for the Furman Paladins in South Carolina (1919–1921)
- Francis Neate (1963), English cricketer (1958–1979); also president of the International Bar Association (2005–2006)
- Steven Segaloff (2000), U.S. Olympic rower and cox; also partner of Cravath, Swaine and Moore
- Colin Milner Smith, English cricketer (1958); also commercial barrister and circuit judge (1991–2009)
- Jim Tanner (1993), sports and entertainment agent
- John F. Tobin (1906), American college football player for the Chicago Maroons and the Nebraska Cornhuskers and coach of Tulane Green Wave

== Other ==
- Albert E. Bowen (1911), member of the Quorum of the Twelve Apostles (LDS Church)
- Kameron Leigh Matthews (2006), physician
- Joanne Lee Molinaro, attorney and food blogger known as the Korean Vegan
- Dallin H. Oaks (1957), first counselor in the First Presidency (LDS Church) (2018–present); also president of Brigham Young University (1971–1980)
- Nirav D. Shah (2007), epidemiologist and economist
- Robert Yellowtail, leader of the Crow people and first Native American to hold the post of Agency Superintendent at an Indian reservation
