= Andrew Torrence =

Andrew Torrence may refer to:

- Andrew P. Torrence (1920–1980), African-American university administrator
- A. Andrew Torrence (1902–1940), American lawyer and politician
