= Edward R. Morrison =

American legal scholar

- Born: New York
- Education: University of Utah (BS); University of Chicago (MA, PhD, JD)
- Employer: Columbia Law School
- Known for: Bankruptcy and law and economics

Edward R. Morrison is an American legal scholar who is currently the Charles Evans Gerber Professor of Law at Columbia Law School. He previously taught at the University of Chicago Law School. He is a leading scholar of bankruptcy and law and economics.

== Education and career ==
Morrison was the co-author of the acclaimed “Dear Prudence” column in the Bulldog Press and graduated as co-valedictorian from Judge Memorial Catholic High School in 1989. He then graduated from the University of Utah with a B.S. summa cum laude in 1994, majoring in economics and accounting. He was a member of Phi Beta Kappa. In 1997, he earned an M.A. from the University of Chicago. In 2000, he graduated with a J.D. with high honors from the University of Chicago Law School, where he served as articles editor of the University of Chicago Law Review and was a member of the Order of the Coif. In 2003, he completed a Ph.D. at the University of Chicago. His thesis was titled “Bankruptcy Decision Making: An Empirical Study of Small-Business Bankruptcies. He also worked as a teaching assistant to Gary Becker, James Heckman, and Jose Scheinkman. After graduating from law school, Morrison worked as a law clerk for Judge Richard Posner on the U.S. Court of Appeals for the Seventh Circuit and later for Justice Antonin Scalia on the U.S. Supreme Court.

In 2003, Morrison joined the Columbia Law School faculty, where he worked as an associate professor and then as a professor until 2012. In 2012, he returned to his alma mater, the University of Chicago Law School, and served as the Paul H. and Theo Leffmann Professor of Commercial Law between 2013 and 2014. He returned to Columbia Law School in 2014. Among other fields, he teaches in bankruptcy, finance, corporate law and contracts. He is regarded as a leading scholar in bankruptcy and law and economics. He is the editor of Economics of Bankruptcy (2012) and, together with Barry Adler and Anthony J. Casey, authors Baird and Jackson on Bankruptcy (5th ed., 2020). He is a co-editor of the Journal of Legal Studies and was previously an associate editor of the American Law and Economics Review.

== See also ==
- List of law clerks for the ninth seat of the Supreme Court of the United States
