= Lucy Reed (lawyer) =

American lawyer

Lucy Ferguson Reed is an American lawyer, scholar and practitioner focusing on international investment arbitration, public international law and international commercial arbitration. Lucy Reed is currently the director of the Centre for International Law. She is also the first Professor of Practice at NUS Law.

== Education ==
Reed earned her Juris Doctor from the University of Chicago Law School in 1977 and a B.A. from Brown University in 1974. She is a member of the New York bar.

== Honours ==
- Meritorious Service Medal, in 2026.
