= William H. Leary =

American academic administrator (1881–1957)

William Henry Leary (June 5, 1881 – April 8, 1957) was the Dean of the University of Utah College of Law, now known as the S.J. Quinney College of Law, from 1915 to 1950.

Leary was born in Hatfield, Massachusetts in 1881. He received a Bachelor of Arts from Amherst College in 1903, and a J.D. degree from the University of Chicago Law School in 1908.

A student favorite, Leary was known to use Jack Dempsey anecdotes to illustrate principles of both assault and battery. He once wrote, "I'd like to see a freer discussion of philosophical questions, a broader more tolerant attitude, a deeper respect for others and a truly intellectual atmosphere."

The College of Law continues to honor Mr. Leary with the Leary Lecture, an annual lecture since 1965.
