= Robert N. Clinton =

American lawyer and professor

Robert N. Clinton is an American constitutional lawyer and native-American tribal judge. He serves as a judge for numerous tribal appellate courts, including as Chief Justice of the Winnebago Supreme Court. Clinton taught as a law professor from 1973-2018. He retired from Arizona State University Sandra Day O'Connor College of Law in 2018 after 45 years of teaching.

In 2016, Clinton wrote an opinion article in U.S. News & World Report arguing that Ted Cruz is not a natural born citizen of the United States, and therefore not eligible to run for president. Clinton posts his photos on CyberShutterbug.com.

Clinton earned a B.A. from University of Michigan in 1968 and a J.D. from University of Chicago in 1971.

== Publications ==
- With Michael G. Collins and Richard A. Matasar, Federal Courts: Theory and Practice (Little, Brown 1996) ISBN 0316263354
- American Indian Law: Native Nations and the Federal System: Selected Federal Indian Law Provisions (Michie 1991) ISBN 0820559822
- Materials & Problems on Federal Copyright Law (University of Iowa College of Law 1988)
