= J. Clinton Searle =

American lawyer and politician

John Clinton Searle (January 10, 1889–August 14, 1952) was an American lawyer and politician.

Searle was born on a farm in Rock Island County, Illinois. He went to the public schools. Searle received his bachelor's degree from University of Illinois in 1911 and his J.D. degree from University of Chicago Law School in 1913. He was admitted to the Illinois bar in 1913 and practiced law in Rock Island County. Searle lived with his wife and family in Rock Island, Illinois. Searle served in the United States Army during World War I and was commissioned a second lieutenant. Searle served in the Illinois House of Representatives from 1927 to 1937 and from 1939 until his death in 1952. He was a Republican. Searle died in Rock Island, Illinois.
