= Lillian Johnson =

American Attorney

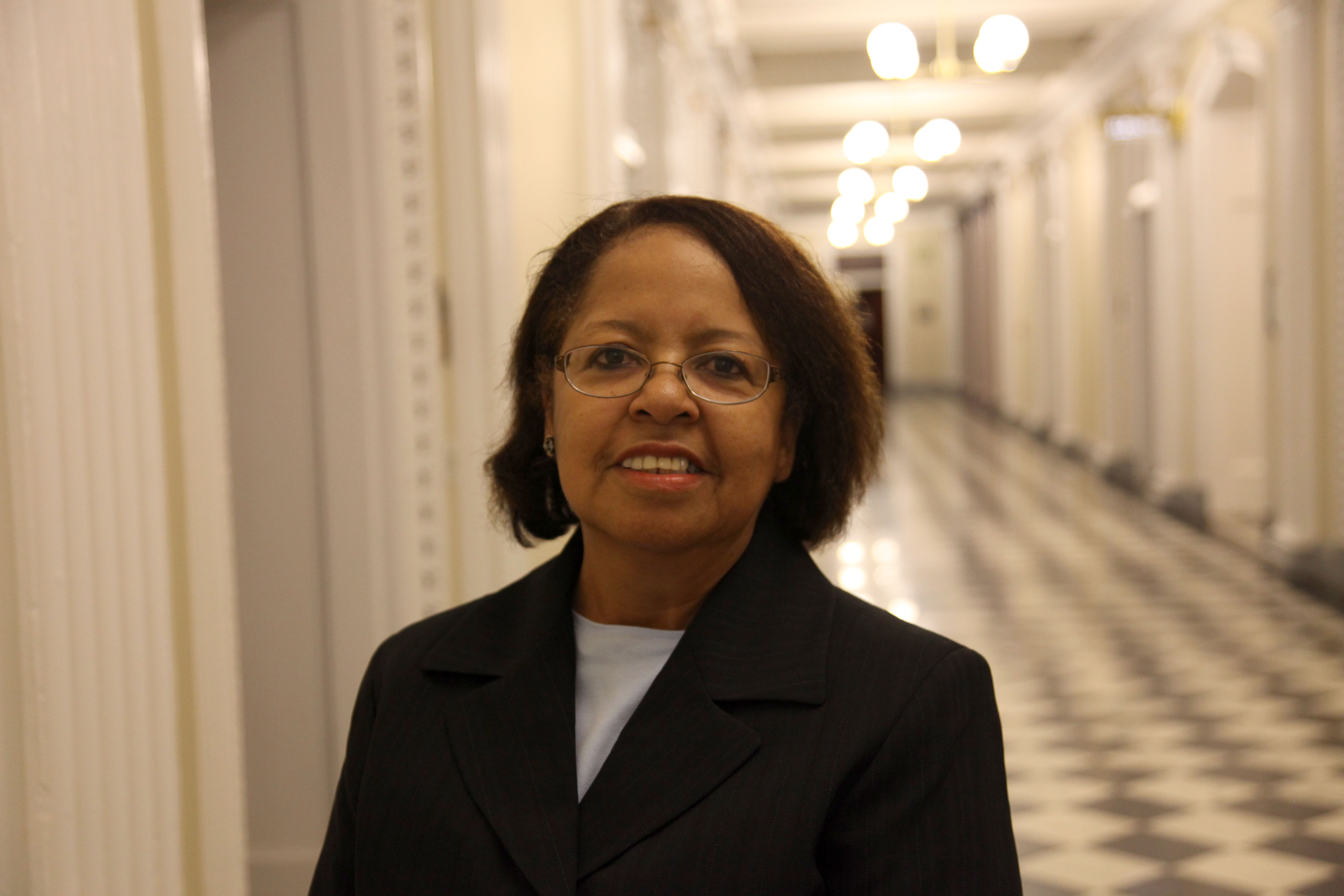
Johnson receiving Obama White House Champions of Change award in 2011

Lillian Johnson is an attorney and civil justice advocate in Arizona. In 2011, Johnson was honored as an Obama White House Champion of Change.

Johnson is on the board of directors of the National Legal Aid & Defender Association. She is the executive director of Community Legal Services, the largest civil legal aid program in Arizona.

== Career ==
Johnson graduated from the University of Chicago Law School in 1975 and took a staff attorney position at the Legal Assistance Foundation in Chicago. Later she was the Assistant to the Regional Director in the 10-state Midwest office of the Legal Services Corporation. In 1982 she moved to Phoenix, Arizona to take the executive director position at Community Legal Services, the largest civil legal aid program in the state.

== Early life, education, and family ==
Johnson grew up in Oklahoma. After graduating from Howard University, she took a position as assistant dean at Middlebury College. While attending law school she met Robert Wright, a community advocate, and they later married.

== Honors ==
In 2011, Johnson was honored as a White House Champion of Change. In 2014, she received the William E. Morris Institute for Justice Hero Award for Access to Justice. In 1997, Johnson was awarded the Charles Dorsey Award by the National Legal Aid & Defender Association.
