= Roderick A. Palmore =

American lawyer and businessperson

Roderick A. Palmore is an American lawyer and businessperson.

== Biography ==
=== Early life ===
He graduated from Yale University and received a J.D. from the University of Chicago Law School.

=== Career ===
He started his career as assistant United States attorney in the Northern District of Illinois. From 1986 to 1993, he was a partner at the law firm Wildman, Harrold, Allen & Dixon. In 1993, he joined Sonnenschein Nath & Rosenthal.

From 1996 to 2008, he worked at the Sara Lee Corporation, including as executive vice president and general counsel from 2004 to 2008. In 2008, he joined General Mills, where he serves as executive vice president, general counsel, chief compliance and risk management officer and secretary. He serves on the board of directors of the Goodyear Tire and Rubber Company and the Chicago Board Options Exchange. He served on the boards of Nuveen Investments and United Way of Metropolitan Chicago.

He sits on the executive committee of the Association of General Counsel. He is the chair of the Leadership Council on Legal Diversity. He is also a member of the American Arbitration Association.

== Bibliography ==
- A Call to Action, Diversity in the Legal Profession (2004)
