= Stephen Gard =

American legal academic

Stephen W. Gard was a Professor of Law at Cleveland-Marshall College of Law in Cleveland, Ohio.

After earning his B.A. from DePauw University he went on to earn his J.D. from Indiana University (where he was an editor of the Indiana Law Review) and subsequently an LL.M. from the University of Chicago.

Gard was previously married to Connie Schultz, current wife of former U.S. Senator Sherrod Brown.
