= Ho Hsiao-yuan =

Chinese jurist

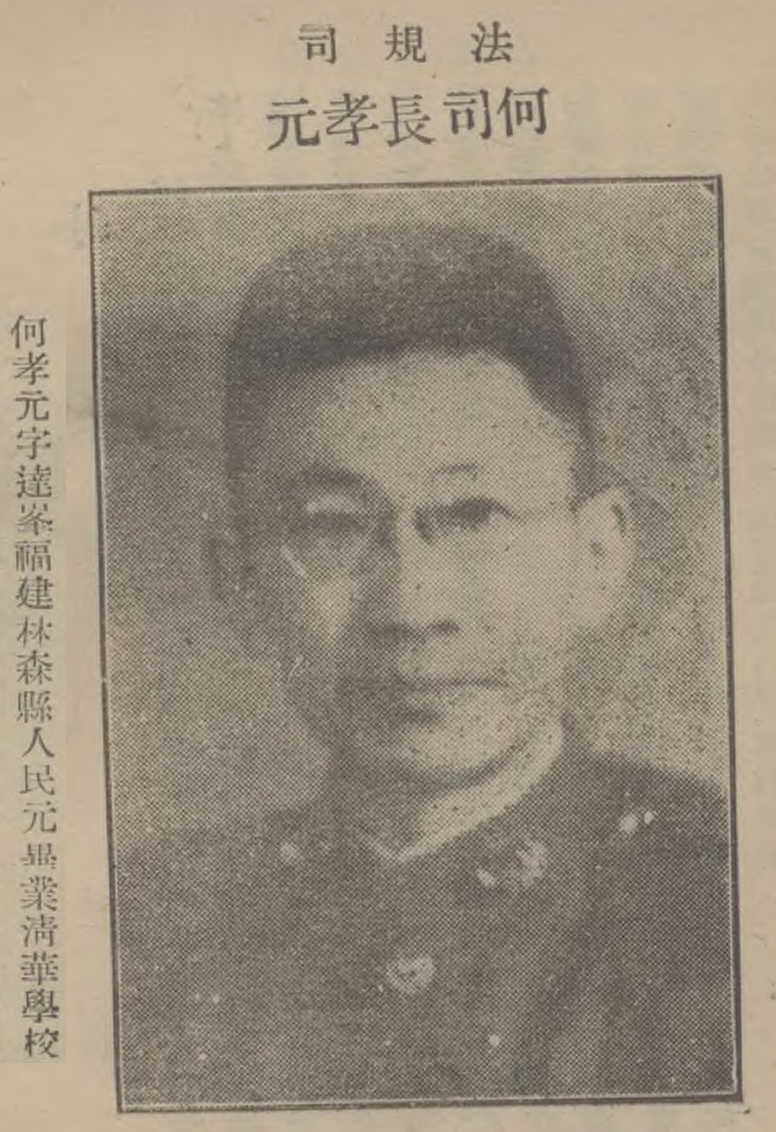
Ho Hsiao-yuan

Ho Hsiao-yuan (Chinese: 何孝元, February 18, 1896 – February 13, 1976) was a Chinese jurist from Fuzhou.

== Education and career ==
He studied engineering at Tsinghua School in his early years, and later went to the United States to study law, specializing in English and American contract law, and received his J.D. from the University of Chicago. After returning to China, he first worked in Northeast China, where he was a director of the Middle East Railway Bureau and secretary to the warlord Zhang Zuolin. He later worked as a lawyer in Shanghai, where he was known as one of the Five Tiger Generals of Shanghai Lawyers.

During the Chinese Civil War he was appreciated by the Minister of National Defense, Bai Chongxi, and served as the director of law and regulations of the Ministry of National Defense, the Director of Military Law of the Central China Banditry General Command, and the Deputy Secretary General of the Central China Military and Political Office. During the February 28th Incident, he represented the Ministry of National Defense and formed a delegation to Taiwan to offer condolences, and in 1949, he accompanied the government of the Republic of China to Taiwan.

After arriving in Taiwan he was a full-time professor at the Provincial School of Local Administration in Taiwan (later reorganized as the College of Law and Business of National Chung Hsing University, now National Taipei University), and also served as the director of the Department of Judicial Administration from 1952. Therefore, Ho was regarded by the Department of Law of National Taipei University as the founding chairman of the department. The scholar Lee Chih-peng was taught by Ho. In his spare time, he often writes and has authored books such as "General Principles of Civil Law", "General Theory of Civil Law Debt", and "Comparison of Chinese Debt Law and British and American Contract Law".

His son, Thomas Hsiao Tung Ho, is a well-known literary creator among Chinese Christians.
