= Carlton Bailey (professor) =

American academic

Carlton Bailey is the Robert A. Leflar Distinguished Professor of Law at the University of Arkansas School of Law. He teaches criminal procedure, trial advocacy, and evidence. As an author, his books have been collected by libraries worldwide.

== Education ==
Bailey received his B.A. from Talladega College and a J.D. from the University of Chicago Law School.

== Career ==
Bailey served as a member of the Governor’s Alternative Sentencing Commission in 1988 and 1989. From 1991 to 2000 Bailey was a member of the Arkansas Supreme Court Committee on Professional Conduct. He was one of two members who stepped aside from cases involving then President Clinton's law license.

While a law professor at the University of Arkansas, Bailey was in the news after he was involved in a racial incident in front of one of the fraternity houses at the University.

Bailey is a member of the Harold Flowers Society and of the National Bar Association .

== Selected works ==
=== Books ===
- Discovery Practice in Arkansas (1994), ISBN 9780943099132
- Carlton Bailey; Robert a Leflar Distinguished Professor of Law Carlton Bailey (1 April 2015). Criminal Procedure: Model Problems and Outstanding Answers. Oxford University Press, Incorporated. ISBN 978-0-19-979519-2.

=== Articles ===
- "Leis v. Flynt-Yet Another Perspective", Black Law Journal (1983)
- "Usual Stipulations are Usually a Mistake at the Oral Deposition", Arkansas Law Notes (1991)
- "Ake v. Oklahoma and an Indigent Defendant's 'Right' to an Expert Witness: A Promise Denied or Imagined?", William & Mary Bill of Rights Journal (2002)
- "Arkansas Adopts a Second Admissibility Test for Novel Scientific Evidence: Do Two Tests Equal One Standard?'", Arkansas Law Review (2003)

== Awards ==
- University of Arkansas School of Law Professor of the Year, 1983
- University of Arkansas Alumni Award, 1988
