= Maggie Anderson (activist) =

American activist (born 1971)

Margarita (Maggie) Anderson
- Born: 1971 (age 53–54); Miami, Florida, U.S.
- Education: North Miami Beach High School; Emory University, B.A. 1993 (political science); University of Chicago, J.D. 1998, M.B.A. 2001
- Employers: 2009 – Present The Empowerment Experiment CEO and Founder; 2007 – Present Stax Inc.; 2000 – 2003 McDonald's, Strategy Manager
- Known for: campaign to buy only from black enterprises
- Notable work: Anderson, Maggie; Ted Gregory (2012). Our black year : one family's quest to buy Black in America's racially divided economy. New York, NY: PublicAffairs. ISBN 9781610390248. LCCN 2011040609.
- Spouse: John Carl Anderson
- Children: 2 daughters
- Website: www.ourblackyear.com

Maggie Anderson (born Margarita; born 1971) is an American activist, author, CEO, and co-founder, with her husband John Anderson, of the Empowerment Experiment.

== Biography ==
Anderson grew up in Liberty City, Miami, Florida and earned degrees at Emory University and University of Chicago. Her husband, John Anderson, is from Detroit, went to Harvard, and earned his MBA at Kellogg School of Management. They conceived the project after an expensive dinner at the posh Tru restaurant on Chicago's Magnificent Mile.

Anderson studied constitutional law under Barack Obama at Chicago Law School. She was an executive at McDonald's.

Anderson and her family spent the entire year of 2009 patronizing, as much as possible, only African-American owned businesses, eschewing all others. She wrote a book about the experience, reporting that in some fields, it was difficult to find black-owned businesses, and that black people patronized businesses within their own ethnic group less than other ethnic groups.

Anderson has participated in successful political campaigns for Rep. John Lewis, Mayor of Atlanta Bill Campbell, and Barack Obama's campaign for U.S. Senate. She has done work for the RainbowPUSH Coalition.

== Books ==
In 2012, Anderson published her first book Our Black Year: One Family's Quest to Buy Black in America's Racially Divided Economy, which she co-authored with Ted Gregory, a Pulitzer Prize-winning journalist at the Chicago Tribune. The book describes the struggle she and her family went through with racism in business professions.

Anderson has also written the following romance fiction novels:

- A Night of Passion (2015)
- Driving Me Crazy (2016)
- Wolf Blood (2017)
- Wolf Curse (2017)
- Christmas, Mistletoe and You (2017)
- Wolf Lover (2019)
- Wolf Bonds (2021)

== See also ==
- African-American businesses
- Black Economic Empowerment
