= Holning Lau =

American lawyer

Holning S. Lau is an American lawyer, currently the Reef C. Ivey II Distinguished Professor of Law at University of North Carolina School of Law.

== Education ==
- J.D., University of Chicago
- B.A., University of Pennsylvania
