= J. Louis von der Mehden =

American musician and composer (1873–1954)

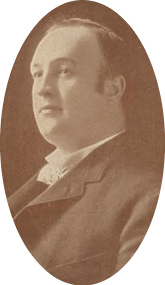
- Born: J. Louis von der Mehden Jr. July 20, 1873; San Francisco, California, US
- Died: August 27, 1954 (aged 81); Middletown, Connecticut, US
- Education: University of Chicago (JD); Yale University (BM)
- Occupations: Musician, composer

Jacob Louis von der Mehden, Jr. (July 20, 1873 – August 27, 1954) was an American cellist, conductor, and composer of classical music. Opened in 1965, the J. Louis von der Mehden Recital Hall on the University of Connecticut's main campus in Storrs was named in his honor.

== Education ==
Von der Mehden was born in San Francisco on July 20, 1873. He graduated from the University of Music and Theatre Leipzig in 1894, earned a Bachelor of Music degree from Yale University in 1924, and earned a law degree via correspondence courses at the Chicago School of Law in 1927. In 1922, Oskaloosa College conferred on him an honorary Doctor of Music Degree.

== Career ==
Von der Mehden worked as first cellist in a San Francisco orchestra for eight years before moving to New York City in 1907. There he worked as a cellist or conductor with various theatrical or commercial orchestras. He briefly served as musical director of the Herald Square Theatre (1910-1911). Between 1912 and 1918, he worked in the recording industry, playing cello or conducting performances. He published numerous musical compositions throughout his career. After 1926, he largely gave up composing and cello, though he studied piano and gave occasional lessons.

== Later life ==
Von der Mehden and his wife, Susan Evelyn Bates (1874–1955), who had married in 1899, purchased property in Old Saybrook in 1911. They moved to Connecticut full-time in 1926, after Susan von der Mehden was laid off from her position at a toy manufacturing company in New York City. Louis died at Middlesex Hospital on August 27, 1954. Susan died the following year.

== Legacy ==
In her will, Susan von der Mehden bequeathed $500,000 to the University of Connecticut. This large bequest surprised university administrators, as the von der Mehdens had no obvious connection to UConn. The bequest was made on condition that the university build a concert hall and hold von der Mehden's musical compositions.
