= J. Calvin Brown =

American lawyer

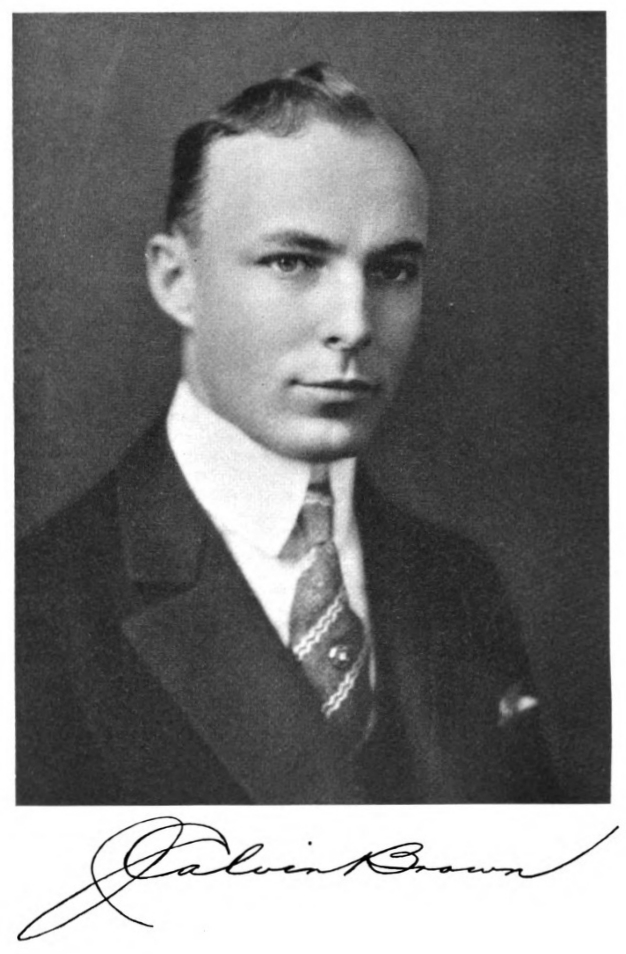
- Born: January 12, 1893; Pomona, California, United States
- Died: April 7, 1973 (aged 80); Clayton, Missouri, United States
- Education: Throop College of Technology; Chicago School of Law
- Known for: internationally known consulting engineer and patent lawyer president of ASME

J. Calvin Brown (January 12, 1893 – April 7, 1973) was an American consulting engineer and patent attorney of Los Angeles, known as the 70th president of the American Society of Mechanical Engineers from 1951 to 1952.

== Biography ==
=== Youth, family and education ===
Brown was born in Pomona, California in 1893, son of James Calhoun and Lily May (Nichols) Brown. The father was a lawyer in Los Angeles from Richmond, Virginia, descendant of the "famous Southern Calhoun family", known as liberally educated men, many with scholastic degrees.

Brown attended Los Angeles High School and graduated in aeronautical engineering at Throop College of Technology, now the California Institute of Technology. Next he graduated at the Chicago School of Law, now University of Chicago Law School. He was engaged in war activities with the United States Army Air Service from the time America entered the World war until December 1918.

=== Career and acknowledgements ===
In 1920 Brown was admitted to the State Bar of California. He started with the patent lawyer firm Raymond Ives Blakeslee, where he became a partner in June 1922. The practice of the firm was focussed on cases involving patents, trademarks, copyrights and unfair competition in the Federal courts. In a dozen years he to "a position of leading importance among the members of the Southern California bar."

Brown was also admitted to the United States Supreme Court and the United States courts of appeals for California, Illinois, and Washington, D.C. From the early 1920s until the early 1940s Brown was president of the Los Angeles Patent Law Association, and participated in several United States Congress hearings on patents. By 1945 he Brown was head of his own firm of J. Calvin Brown, Los Angeles.

In 1950 Brown was elected new president of the American Society of Mechanical Engineers at the Society's 71st annual meeting in New York City. From 1945 to 1949 he had served as vice-president. In 1952 he was succeeded as ASME president by Reginald J. S. Pigott. Brown also served as member of the John Fritz Medal Board of Award, and was director of the Centennial of Engineering exposition held in Chicago in 1952.
