= Nancy Feldman =

American activist

Nancy G. Feldman
- Born: Nancy Goodman; October 4, 1922; Highland Park, IL
- Died: February 17, 2014 (aged 91); Tulsa, OK
- Occupations: Formerly a college professor and Tulsa civic leader
- Known for: Civil rights activist, Tulsa, OK civic leader
- Spouse: Raymond Feldman

Nancy G. Feldman (October 4, 1922 – February 17, 2014) was a civil rights activist and longtime educator from the U.S. state of Illinois. Feldman taught at the University of Tulsa for thirty-seven years and lectured across the United States and internationally. Feldman was inducted to the Oklahoma Women's Hall of Fame in 1995. Her advocating for the expansion of art education in Tulsa public schools remains one of her biggest legacies. Feldman and her husband traveled to some of the most remote locations in the world during their retirement and worked to connect Tulsa with the world through the Tulsa Global Alliance.

== Early life ==
Nancy G. Feldman grew up in Highland Park, IL, a suburb of Chicago. She had one younger brother and one older sister. Her parents moved to Highland Park with several of their college friends, providing a tight-knit community of family friends in which Nancy was raised. Her parents did well financially and sent Feldman to Elm Place Grammar School, a school in which you learned through tactile activities. Feldman was raised Jewish, though she had a broad exposure to many religions and ethnic backgrounds. Her parents were very influential in her education and strongly encouraged her to attend an eastern women's college. Outside of school, Feldman was involved with the Girl Scouts and athletics. She was an accomplished diver and trained for the Olympics until she broke her back at age 16 in 1939. This unfortunate accident refocused Feldman's efforts into becoming a scholar rather than an athlete.

=== Education ===
Feldman took classes at Northwestern University while still in high school. Although she was accepted to all of the schools she applied to, Feldman ultimately decided to attend Vassar College. She initially started out majoring in music but later changed. Feldman attended Vassar for two years and briefly transferred back to Northwestern. After a discussion with her lawyer brother-in-law, Feldman applied and was accepted to the University of Chicago Law School. She graduated with her Juris Doctor in the spring of 1946 as the top woman of her class. While at the University of Chicago, Feldman met her husband, Raymond Feldman, a native Oklahoman from Tulsa. Before marrying, Nancy traveled to Tulsa with Raymond and was horrified by the racial segregation at work. Raymond proposed that she "marry [him] and change it." The two married in March 1946 and moved to Tulsa.

== Career ==
At the time when Feldman moved to Tulsa, female lawyers were not readily hired. She easily changed her path and became a professor of sociology at the University of Tulsa, where she taught for 37 years. Feldman was extended invitations to lecture in England, India, Egypt, Israel, Peru and around the United States. Feldman was a dedicated educator, as well as a mother and wife at the time. Feldman was chosen by Oklahoma State University to work for five years in a "Professors of the City" program, which helped to create the Model Cities Plan for economic and educational development in Tulsa. While at the University of Tulsa, Feldman co-authored an article that gained the attention of the National Space Institute, who were looking for a humanist to add to their board. Feldman was chosen for the position and served 9 years on its Board and Executive Committee.

Feldman championed many causes in her active life. The five main beneficiaries of Feldman's energy include Family and Children's Services, local and national Planned Parenthood, Community Service Council, local, national and international Girl Scouts, and the Arts and Humanities Council. She was instrumental in the expansion of art education in Tulsa schools.

Feldman was strongly opposed to the current segregation in Tulsa and did everything she could to work toward racial equality. She volunteered herself in several sit-ins at what is now Wild Fork and became a member of NAACP (National Association for the Advancement of Colored People). Feldman successfully lobbied for the first black student to be admitted to Holland Hall, the school her children attended at the time. Not only was she a champion of race rights, but she was an advocate of all civil equality. She was the state chairperson of the Commission on the Status of Women, the Oklahoma Civil Liberties Commission, and applied herself in the effort to get the ERA (Equal Rights Amendment) passed in 1972.

She also founded the Tulsa Center for the Physically Limited and the International Council of Tulsa, later known as the Tulsa Global Alliance. Feldman was the first woman president of a major Tulsa arts organization. As the president of the Tulsa Ballet, she wrote the first set of bylaws for the organization that helped it expand from a local company to a company of international acclaim.

== Retirement ==
In retirement, Feldman and her husband traveled around the world and completed seven Himalayan treks. The couple's travels to some of the most remote parts of the world have become a legend in Tulsa. Feldman is quoted as saying that Nepal is one her favorite locations that she and Raymond visited in their extensive travels. Feldman died in 2014 due to the complications of cancer.

=== Achievements and awards ===
- League of Women Voters of Metropolitan Tulsa's Pathfinder Award (2004)
- Inducted into the Tulsa Hall of Fame (1998)
- Tulsa Press Club's Headliner honoree (2002)
- Governor's Arts Award (2001)
- Inducted Oklahoma Women's Hall of Fame (2005)
- Honoree for Tulsa Historical Society and Museum (1997)
- Tulsa Area United Way's 2013 Clydella Hentschel Award for Women in Leadership
