= Harry Schneider =

Guantanamo Bay attorney

Harry Schneider (born c. 1954) is an American lawyer and partner at the firm of Perkins Coie, in Seattle, Washington. Schneider volunteered to work on behalf of Guantanamo captive Salim Ahmed Hamdan.

According to an investigative report by the Seattle Times Schneider was part of a consortium which purchased the now-defunct Seattle SuperSonics basketball team in 2001.

== Education ==
He received his A.B. in 1976 from University of California and his J.D. in 1979 from University of Chicago Law School.

== Legal career ==
Schneider joined Perkins Coie in 1979. The areas he works in include litigation, trial, and intellectual property. Boeing is one of his clients.

=== Work in intellectual property ===
Schneider's intellectual property cases include:

- Electronics Arts v. Lee
- Lemon v. The Artist Formerly Known as Prince
- Nintendo of America Inc. v. Taiwan Semiconductor Manufacturing Co., Ltd.
- Nintendo of America Inc. v. Winbond Electronics Corp.
- Nintendo of America Inc. v. Samsung
- ZZ Top v. Chrysler

=== Work on behalf of Guantanamo captives ===
Schneider and his colleague, Joe McMillan began participating in the defense of Salim Ahmed Hamdan in the winter of 2004.

On 23 October 2008 Schneider was scheduled to receive the Thomas C. Wales Award for Passionate Citizenship for his work on behalf of Guantanamo captives. According to the Seattle Post Intelligencer the press release announcing his award stated he was to receive it due to his:

passionate citizenship for his leadership, dedication and groundbreaking work defending Salim Hamdan. Schneider's pro bono representation of Hamdan, the first detainee to receive a trial, has laid the groundwork for others to challenge the legality of their indefinite imprisonment. Schneider's landmark work exemplifies our Constitution's guarantee of due process and fundamental fairness, even for society's most unpopular individuals.
