= Miriam Balanoff =

American judge and politician (1926–2017)

Miriam Balanoff (née Dweck; March 4, 1926 – September, 2017) was an American judge and politician who served as a Democratic member of the Illinois House of Representatives.

== Biography ==
Balanoff was born March 4, 1926, in Brooklyn. She spent much of her childhood in foster homes. She later attended Hunter College before moving to Chicago to earn her bachelor's at the University of Chicago and receive her J.D. degree from University of Chicago Law School in 1963. She then practiced law in Chicago. In 1978, she defeated incumbent Frank Giglio in the Democratic primary by a narrow margin. She was elected to serve as one of the three members of the Illinois House of Representatives from the 30th legislative district with Democratic incumbent Glenn Dawson and Republican incumbent Phil W. Collins taking the other two spots. She introduced the Employer Relocation Act which would have required that companies give advance notice before closing down, guarantee severance pay, and contribute to a special community fund for job retraining or development. She was an advocate of the Equal Rights Amendment while a member of the House.

She served in the Illinois House for two terms. In the 1983 election, she ran against Vrdolyak for alderman in the 10th ward receiving 30% of the vote. In the 1986 general election, she was elected to a judgeship on the Circuit Court of Cook County with the backing of Harold Washington. Her husband was Clement Balanoff, Sr., who was a steel worker and a union activist. Their son Clem Balanoff also served in the Illinois General Assembly. She died in September, 2017 at age 91 after suffering from dementia for several years. She was Jewish.
