= Paul Grewal =

American attorney

Paul S. Grewal

U.S. Magistrate Judge of the United States District Court for the Northern District of California
- In office December 1, 2010 – June 3, 2016
- Preceded by: Patricia Trumbull
- Succeeded by: Susan van Keulen

Personal details
- Education: Massachusetts Institute of Technology (SB); University of Chicago (JD)

Paul Singh Grewal is an American attorney and former chief legal officer at Coinbase. Previously, Grewal was vice president and deputy general counsel at Facebook, and is also a former U.S. magistrate judge for the United States District Court for the Northern District of California.

== Education ==
Grewal earned a Bachelor of Science degree civil and environmental engineering from the Massachusetts Institute of Technology in 1993, where he was elected to Tau Beta Pi and Sigma Xi. Grewal then earned a J.D. degree from the University of Chicago in 1996.

== Career ==
Upon graduation from law school, Grewal served as a judicial law clerk for Sam H. Bell of the United States District Court for the Northern District of Ohio. After his clerkship, he joined the law firm of Pillsbury Winthrop Shaw Pittman LLP (then known as Pillsbury, Madison & Sutro LLP), primarily practicing complex commercial litigation. After working at Pillsbury, Grewal then served as a judicial law clerk for Judge Arthur J. Gajarsa of the United States Court of Appeals for the Federal Circuit.

After his clerkship with Judge Gajarsa, Grewal joined the law firm of Day Casebeer Madrid & Batchelder (Howrey), where he became a partner and served on the firm's management committee, and where his practice focused on intellectual property litigation and patent litigation, with an emphasis on federal patent trials in district courts across the country and appellate work at a variety of federal appellate courts, including the Federal Circuit. In private practice, Grewal was also a registered patent attorney admitted to practice before the United States Patent and Trademark Office, and he performed re-examinations for his clients, which included independent inventors and companies in the high-technology, biotechnology, medical device, and financial firm/service spaces.

Grewal was a former president of the South Asian Bar of Northern California and the Northern American South Asian Bar Association. In 2010, Grewal was named as a "Best Lawyer Under 40" by the National Asian Pacific American Bar Association (NAPABA).

Grewal is the former president of the National South Asian Bar Association. Grewal was approved to join the Board of Directors for Zapproved, an electronic discovery software provider, in July 2021.

=== Magistrate judge ===
On December 1, 2010, Grewal was sworn in as a U.S. magistrate judge for the United States District Court for the Northern District of California. At that time, he was only the second sitting South Asian federal magistrate judge in the United States. While a judge on that court, Grewal sat on the Northern District's Technology Practice and Patent Instructions and Rules Committees. Grewal was also appointed by Chief Justice John Roberts to the Federal Judicial Center’s Magistrate Judge Education Committee and served as a co-chair of the Federal Circuit Bar Association’s Judges Committee.

=== Facebook ===
On May 12, 2016, it was reported that Grewal would leave the bench in June 2016 to join Facebook as their vice president and deputy general counsel. Grewal retired from the bench on June 3, 2016. He joined Facebook in June 2016.

=== Coinbase ===
On July 9, 2020, it was announced that Grewal would replace Brian Brooks as chief legal officer at Coinbase, a cryptocurrency exchange. On June 14, 2022, Coinbase announced that it would layoff 18% of its workforce. Grewal defended the layoffs, arguing that it needed to be done to "ensure we stay healthy during this economic downturn." According to the 2022 Proxy Statement, Grewal beneficially owns 767,759 Class A Common Stock. In July 2026, Grewal announced his resignation. He remains an adviser and a member of the board of Coinbase National Trust Company.

== See also ==
- List of Asian American jurists
