= Randal C. Picker =

American legal scholar (1959–2026)

- Born: October 15, 1959
- Died: August 15, 2026 (aged 66); Chicago, Illinois, U.S.
- Education: University of Chicago (BA, MA, JD)
- Employer: University of Chicago Law School
- Known for: Antitrust law and intellectual property law

Randal C. Picker (October 15, 1959 – August 15, 2026) was an American legal scholar who was the James Parker Hall Distinguished Service Professor of Law at the University of Chicago Law School. He was an expert in antitrust law and intellectual property law. His areas of interest also included law and economics, regulated industries, and bankruptcy law.

== Life and career ==
Picker graduated from the University of Chicago with a B.A. cum laude in 1980, majoring in economics. He was a member of Phi Beta Kappa. He continued his studies at Chicago and graduated with a M.A. as a Friedman fellow in 1982. In 1985, he graduated with a J.D. cum laude from the University of Chicago Law School, where he was an associate editor of the University of Chicago Law Review.

After graduating from law school, Picker clerked for Judge Richard A. Posner on the U.S. Court of Appeals for the Seventh Circuit. Between 1986 and 1999, he practised as an attorney at Sidley & Austin in Chicago, where he worked in the areas of debt restructuring and corporate reorganizations in bankruptcy.

He joined the faculty at the University of Chicago Law School in 1989. He has written in the areas of intellectual property, antitrust policy and regulated industries, and applications of game theory and agent-based computer simulations to the law. He taught classes in antitrust law, network industries, secured transactions, and bankruptcy and corporate reorganizations.

Picker died on August 15, 2026, at the age of 66.

== Publications ==
Books (Author)

1993

Strategic Behavior and the Law: The Role of Game Theory and Information Economics in Legal Analysis (with Douglas G. Baird & Robert H. Gertner)

1994

Game Theory and the Law (with Douglas G. Baird & Robert H. Gertner)

Reforming the Bankruptcy Code: The National Bankruptcy Conference's Code Review Project (Matthew Bender)

2002

Security Interests in Personal Property: Cases, Problems, and Materials (3rd ed.) (with Douglas G. Baird & Thomas H. Jackson)

2009

Security Interests in Personal Property: Cases, Problems, and Materials (4th ed.) (with Douglas G. Baird & Thomas H. Jackson).

2018

Antitrust Law and Trade Regulation: Cases and Materials (7th ed.) (with A. Douglas Melamed & Philip J. Weiser & Diane P. Wood).

2026

The Quest For Next: A Competitive History of the Computer History (Princeton University Press, forthcoming).
