= Susan M. Moss =

American lawyer

Susan M. Moss (born May 26, 1969) is a partner at the Law Firm Chemtob Moss & Forman LLP; a firm devoted to the practice of family law, divorce, pre-nuptial agreements and paternity suits. She was born in New York City, NY and grew up in Oceanside, New York. Moss specializes in matrimonial law and is experienced in negotiating settlements and in litigating cases through trial and appeal.

Moss received her undergraduate education at the University of Pennsylvania (B. S.E., B.A., 1991). She graduated with the Ivan Berg Award and the Brownlee Award. She attended law school at the University of Chicago (J. D., 1994), where she was the Managing Editor of the University of Chicago Roundtable Law Journal. Moss graduated in 1994 with the Ann Watson Barber Award.

Susan Moss is currently a Fellow in the American Academy of Matrimonial Lawyers, a Fellow in the International Academy of Matrimonial Lawyers, and the Chairperson of the Matrimonial Committee of the Woman's Bar Association of the State of New York. On numerous occasions, Moss has been appointed as a Law Guardian in the Supreme Court of the State of New York, New York County. Moss has appeared as a legal analysis on NBC's The Today Show and as a guest expert on the cable television show Families in Transition, where she spoke about "double-dipping" in child support. Other appearances include CNN Headline News, Nancy Grace, and Fox News. She has commented on Matrimonial Law in various New York based newspapers. In 2008, Moss was listed on Crain's 40 Under 40 List.
