= Centre for International Law =

Singaporean research institute

Coordinates: 1.3183°N 103.8175°E

The Centre for International Law (CIL) was established in 2009 at the National University of Singapore (NUS), in response to the growing need for international law expertise and capacity building in the Asia-Pacific region.

The CIL engages in research and capacity building on international law and policy. The Centre organises conferences, seminars and forums to encourage dialogue and the sharing of information on significant international law and policy issues affecting South East Asia or the Asia-Pacific region. The centre also collaborates with a network of partner organisations in Singapore and overseas to further the development of international law and policy thought leadership in the region.

== Organization ==
Since January 2020, Dr Nilüfer Oral has been the CIL Director. Dr Oral is a member of the International Law Commission (ILC), Second Vice-chair of the ILC, and co-chair of the ILC Study Group on Sea-Level Rise in relation to International Law. She took over the CIL directorship from Professor Lucy Reed, a globally renowned arbitration lawyer.

Emeritus Professor Robert C Beckman, the first CIL Director, continues to head CIL's Ocean Law and Policy programme.

Professor Tommy Koh and Professor S Jayakumar chair the CIL Governing Board and International Advisory Panel respectively.

== Focus Areas ==
The CIL's research focuses on the following thematic areas:

- ASEAN Law and Policy
- Ocean Law and Policy
- Investment Law and Policy
- International Law and Practice, which includes International Dispute Resolution, Nuclear Law and Policy, and Teaching and Researching International Law in Asia (TRILA)

The centre maintains a document database, an online searchable resource of ASEAN Documents and International Law Documents.
