= A. Andrew Torrence =

American lawyer and politician

A. Andrew Torrence (June 8, 1902 – April 8, 1940) was an American lawyer and politician.

Born in Baltimore, Maryland, Torrence went to University of Detroit, Central YMCA College, Northwestern University School of Law, and University of Chicago Law School. He practiced law in Chicago, Illinois and taught public speaking at the University of Chicago Law School. Torrence was an African-American and a Republican. From 1939 until his death in 1940, Torrence served in the Illinois House of Representatives. Torrence was stabbed and shot by Cecil Woodward, an African-American, in a campaign headquarters the day before the Illinois Primary Election. Woodward was upset about losing a precinct captain position. Woodward later died suddenly while being questioned in the state's attorney's office.
