= Barry Adler =

American legal scholar

Barry E. Adler
- Education: Cornell University (BA); University of Chicago Law School (JD)
- Employer: New York University School of Law
- Known for: Bankruptcy

Barry E. Adler is an American legal scholar who is currently the Bernard Petrie Professor of Law and Business at the New York University School of Law. He is a leading scholar of bankruptcy law.

== Education and career ==
Adler graduated from Cornell University with a B.S. with honors in 1982. In 1985, he graduated with a J.D. with honors from the University of Chicago Law School, where he was a finalist in the Hinton Moot Court Competition.

After graduating from law school, Adler worked as a law clerk for Judge Frank Easterbrook on the U.S. Court of Appeals for the Seventh Circuit. Between 1986 and 1988, he was an associate at Cleary, Gottlieb, Steen & Hamilton in New York. He served on the faculties of the George Mason University School of Law and the Emory University School of Law before joining the University of Virginia School of Law in 1994. At Virginia, he served as a tenured professor.

In 1996, Adler joined the New York University School of Law faculty. He teaches in the areas of bankruptcy, corporate law, and finance. He has written widely on the application of corporate finance theory to bankruptcy, arguing that bankruptcy law may be understood as a crucial part of private law rather than as solely a supplemental body of law applied after corporate collapse. He is a co-author of Cases, Problems, and Materials on Bankruptcy with Douglas G. Baird and Thomas H. Jackson. He also writes in the areas of contract and corporate law.
