= 1987 Pulitzer Prize =

Awards for journalism and related fields

The following are the Pulitzer Prizes for 1987.

== Journalism ==
- Public service: Pittsburgh Press
  - "For reporting by Andrew Schneider and Matthew Brelis which revealed the inadequacy of the FAA's medical screening of airline pilots and led to significant reforms."
- General news reporting: Staff of the Akron Beacon Journal
  - "For its coverage, under deadline pressure, of the attempted takeover of Goodyear Tire and Rubber Co. by a European financier."
- Investigative reporting: John Woestendiek of The Philadelphia Inquirer
  - "For outstanding prison beat reporting, which included proving the innocence of a man convicted of murder."
- Investigative reporting: Daniel R. Biddle, H. G. Bissinger and Fredric N. Tulsky of The Philadelphia Inquirer
  - For their series "Disorder in the Court," which revealed transgressions of justice in the Philadelphia court system and led to federal and state investigations."
- Explanatory reporting: Jeff Lyon and Peter Gorner of the Chicago Tribune
  - "For their series on the promises of gene therapy, which examined the implications of this revolutionary medical treatment."
- Specialized Reporting: Alex S. Jones of The New York Times
  - "For "The Fall of the House of Bingham," a skillful and sensitive report of a powerful newspaper family's bickering and how it led to the sale of a famed media empire."
- National Reporting: Staff of The Miami Herald
  - "For its exclusive reporting and persistent coverage of the U.S.-Iran-Contra connection."
- National Reporting: Staff of The New York Times
  - "For coverage of the aftermath of the Challenger explosion, which included stories that identified serious flaws in the shuttle's design and in the administration of America's space program."
- International reporting: Michael Parks of the Los Angeles Times
  - "For his balanced and comprehensive coverage of South Africa."
- Feature writing: Steve Twomey of The Philadelphia Inquirer
  - "For his illuminating profile of life aboard an aircraft carrier."
- Commentary: Charles Krauthammer of The Washington Post Writers Group
  - "For his witty and insightful columns on national issues."
- Criticism: Richard Eder of the Los Angeles Times
  - "For his book reviews."
- Editorial writing: Jonathan Freedman of The San Diego Union-Tribune
  - "For his editorials urging passage of the first major immigration reform act in 34 years."
- Editorial cartooning: Berkeley Breathed of The Washington Post Writers Group
- Spot news photography: Kim Komenich of the San Francisco Examiner
  - "For his photographic coverage of the fall of Ferdinand Marcos."
- Feature photography: David Peterson of Des Moines Register
  - "For his photographs depicting the shattered dreams of American farmers."

== Letters and Drama ==
- Fiction: A Summons to Memphis by Peter Taylor (Alfred A. Knopf)
- Drama: Fences by August Wilson (Plume)
- History: Voyagers to the West: A Passage in the Peopling of America on the Eve of the Revolution by Bernard Bailyn (Alfred A. Knopf)
- Biography or Autobiography: Bearing the Cross: Martin Luther King Jr. and the Southern Christian Leadership Conference by David J. Garrow (William Morrow)
- Poetry: Thomas and Beulah by Rita Dove (Carnegie-Mellon University Press)
- General Nonfiction: Arab and Jew: Wounded Spirits in a Promised Land by David K. Shipler (Times Books)
- Music: The Flight Into Egypt by John Harbison (Associated Music Publishers)
  Premiered November 21, 1987, by Cantata Singers and Ensemble.

== Special Citations and Awards ==
- Special Awards and Citations - Journalism: Joseph Pulitzer Jr.
  - "For his extraordinary services to American journalism and letters during his 31 years as chairman of the Pulitzer Prize Board and for his accomplishments as an editor and publisher."
