= Lazarsfeld =

Lazarsfeld is a surname. Notable people with the surname include:

- Paul Lazarsfeld (1901–1976), Austrian-American sociologist
- Robert Lazarsfeld (born 1953), American mathematician
- Sophie Lazarsfeld (1881–1976), Austrian-American therapist and writer
