= Radio Research Project =

The Radio Research Project was a social research project funded by the Rockefeller Foundation to look into the effects of mass media on society.

In 1937, the Rockefeller Foundation started funding research to find the effects of new forms of mass media on society, especially radio. Several universities joined up and a headquarters was formed at the School of Public and International Affairs at Princeton University.

A particularly influential program of effects research was pursued in the Office of Radio Research (ORR) established by the Rockefeller Foundation under the auspices of Princeton University. Managed by Paul Lazarsfeld, Austrian émigré psychologist, the program was overseen by Hadley Cantril, Princeton psychologist, and Frank Stanton, director of research at CBS. The program was designed by Cantril and Stanton to determine why people listened to radio. Stanton, a psychological researcher who soon became CBS president, was naturally interested in what lured people to programs and to what extent a program and its ads boosted sales of products.

Among the subjects of the Project's first studies were soap operas, known as radio dramas at the time. Herta Herzog authored an article on this research, titled "What Do We Really Know About Daytime Serial Listeners?" It is considered a pioneering work of the uses-and-gratifications approach and the use of psychology research methods in media studies. Herta Herzog was formerly the Associate Director of the Office of Radio Research where she worked on consulting studies.

The Radio Project also conducted research on the Halloween broadcast of The War of the Worlds in 1938. Of the estimated six million people who heard this broadcast, they found that 25% accepted the program's reports of mass destruction. The majority of these did not think they were hearing a literal invasion from Mars, but rather an attack by Germany. The researchers determined that radio broadcasts from the Munich Crisis may have lent credence to this supposition. Pooley and Socolow (2013), however, contend that Cantril used inaccurate audience measurement methods which grossly overestimated the listening audience. Sensationalistic newspaper publicity following the broadcast also led to the myth of the terrorized audience that has continued well into the 21st century.

A third research project was that of listening habits. Because of this, a new method was developed to survey an audience – this was dubbed the Little Annie Project. The official name was the Stanton-Lazarsfeld Program Analyzer. This allowed one not only to find out if a listener liked the performance, but how they felt at any individual moment, through a dial which they would turn to express their preference (positive or negative). This has since become an essential tool in focus group research.

Theodor Adorno produced numerous reports on the effects of "atomized listening" which radio supported and of which he was highly critical. However, because of profound methodological disagreements with Lazarsfeld over the use of techniques such as listener surveys and "Little Annie" (Adorno thought both grossly simplified and ignored the degree to which expressed tastes were the result of commercial marketing), Adorno left the project in 1941.
