= Herta Herzog =

American social scientist

Herta Herzog-Massing (August 14, 1910 – February 25, 2010) was an Austrian-American social scientist specializing in communication studies. Her most prominent contribution to the field, an article entitled "What Do We Really Know About Daytime Serial Listeners?", is considered a pioneering work of the uses-and-gratifications approach and the cognitive revolution in media research. She was married to Paul Lazarsfeld, and later to Paul Massing, and was stepmother to Lazarsfeld's daughter, MIT professor Lotte Bailyn.

== Biography ==
Originally a student of Karl Bühler at university in Vienna, Herzog elected to do her dissertation under Paul Lazarsfeld, a survey about the then-new medium of radio. She received her Ph.D. in psychology in 1932 despite developing a crippling case of polio, from which her right arm never fully recovered.

In 1935, she followed Lazarsfeld to the United States and married him there shortly after Lazarsfeld's divorce from Marie Jahoda. After a brief period as research assistant to Robert Staughton Lynd, Herzog joined the Radio Project as the Associate Director for consulting studies. At the Radio Project, she was part of the team of that conducted the groundbreaking research on Orson Welles' 1938 broadcast of The War of the Worlds in the study The Invasion from Mars. In her most famous work, "What Do We Really Know About Daytime Serial Listeners?", she surveyed housewives about their motivations for listening to radio soap operas, suggesting a conscious selection process on the part of the listener in a move away from the still dominant behaviorism theories of media effects of the time. While Herzog was a specialist of qualitative pilot studies and is even credited with developing the modern focus group methodology, her work is characterized throughout by a pragmatic mix of qualitative and quantitative methods.

In 1943, Herzog left the Radio Project and joined the market research department of McCann Erickson in New York City, where she eventually became chairwoman of the McCann market research unit, Marplan. She divorced Lazarsfeld in 1945 and married Rutgers University professor Paul Massing in 1954. In 1964, she joined Jack Tinker and Partners, a creative think tank set up by McCann. She retired from full-time market research in 1970 to spend more time with her husband, who had been diagnosed with Parkinson's disease. They returned to Europe in 1976.

After Massing's death in 1979, Herzog returned to academia, teaching at University of Tübingen and Vienna, and publishing scholarly articles, most famously about the reception of American prime-time television soap operas (primarily Dallas and Dynasty) in Germany as well as one study about antisemitism in Austria.

She continued to do research work well into the 1990s, based in Leutasch, Tyrol, near her sister's family. She died there in 2010 at the age of 99, the last survivor of the founders' generation of market research.

== Major works ==
Herzog's On Borrowed Experience: An Analysis of Listening to Daytime Sketches was published in the Studies in Philosophy and Social Science journal in 1941. It was published alongside Paul Lazarsfeld’s Administrative and Critical Communications Research, Theodor Adorno’s On Popular Music, Max Horkheimer’s Art and Mass Culture, Harold Lasswell’s Radio as an Instrument of Reducing Personal Insecurity and Herbert Marcuse’s Some Social Implications of Modern Technology. Herzog was a pioneer of the uses and gratifications approach to the study of radio broadcast programs, with On Borrowed Experience examining the study of female audience for daytime radio serials. On Borrowed Experience has had a revival in Canonic Texts.

Herzog’s study involved asking questions to women who listen to daytime radio programs on a regular basis, with questions including "what do the programs mean to you?" "why do you listen to the programs?" and "what do you do with what you hear on the programs?" From the responses to these questions, Herzog summarized them into one "stereotyped formula" of "getting into trouble and out again". Herzog is also able to determine a correlation between the number of programs listened to per day and the complexity of the listener's troubles, "The more complex the listener’s troubles are or the less able she is to cope with them, the more programs she seems to listen to".

Herzog alludes to three main types of gratification for listening:

1. "Listening as emotional release:" Herzog highlights that the radio programs offers listener's emotional stimuli and opportunities for emotional release, such as through crying and excitement. Herzog also points out listeners feel relief knowing "other people had their troubles too."
2. "Listening as means of remodelling one’s drudgery:" Herzog suggests listeners tend to fictionalize themselves in order to be able to experience what is occurring in the radio program. "She not only feels with the characters, like the person who gets emotional release from listening; she is the characters." Listeners are afforded opportunities to imagine happier situation, relive the past, fill in the gaps and revel in other's success.
3. "Listening for recipes making for adjustment:" Herzog highlights that the radio programs offers listener's an ideology by which they can look at their own situation. "Listening provides them with an ideology to be applied in the appraisal of the world which is actually confronting them." The radio programs offer listener's with "remedies" to confront their problems.

Critics now see On Borrowed Experience as part of the Columbia School. The Columbia School engaged in new methods to gauge audience attitudes and behaviours rather than simply studying content. Liebes explains, "Its view of the audience is not at all limited to reporting on what people do "with" the media, but also in the spirit of critical theory, on what the media do "to" them". Herzog's choice to interview the radio listeners, rather than simply analyse the content, gives the listeners a voice and the opportunity to justify their actions, as opposed to Herzog making assumptions. Liebes explains "This is read as treating audiences with respect, analyzing the content from their own perspective."

== Bibliography ==
- Herzog, Herta (1941) 'On Borrowed Experience', Studies in Philosophy and Social Science, 11: 65–95
- Scannell, Paddy (2007) Media and Communication, London: Sage Publications.
- Liebes, Tamar (2003) 'Herzog's "On Borrowed Experience": Its Place in the Debate over the Active Audience', in Katz et al. (eds.), Canonic Texts, 39–53.
