= Carrie Rentschler =

Carrie A. Rentschler
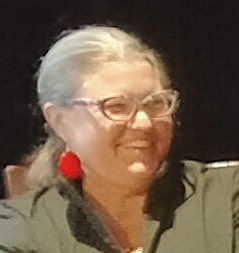
- Education: University of Minnesota, B.A. University of Illinois at Urbana-Champaign, M.A. and PhD
- Occupations: professor, scholar, author

Carrie A. Rentschler is a scholar of feminist media studies and associate professor at McGill University located in Montreal, Quebec, Canada. Rentschler's work focuses on how media produces culture and its effects on women's lives and the reproduction of rape culture. She advocates anti-violence through the production of media to reduce violent crime.

== Background ==
Carrie A. Rentschler is a William Dawson Scholar in Feminist Media studies. She was the director of the Institute for Gender, Sexuality and Feminist studies at McGill University from 2011 to 2015. At the Institute, Rentschler teaches courses at both the undergraduate and graduate levels. These courses include feminist media studies, media and the politics of emotion and affect, cultural studies of news, crime/media/culture, and feminist theories and methods. Rentschler earned her BA magna cum laude in Humanities from the University of Minnesota in 1994, she received both her MA and PhD in Communications from the University of Illinois at Urbana-Champaign in 1998 and 2002 respectively.

== Research interests ==
Rentschler's research interests center around media, pertaining to media as a cultural producer in representations of physical victimization and psychological trauma, and how these representations serve to inform viewers opinions about war, terrorism, citizenship and crime. She pays particular focus as to how these issues specifically impact women's lives. Several examples of Rentschler conducting feminist research include, the disproportionate criminalization and incarceration of women of colour in the justice system, as well as her research into using social media as a tool to inform, empower women and expose the perpetrators of rape culture, in an effort to halt the perpetuation of rape culture. Rentschler also believes that women may feel more empowered by engaging in self-defense strategies.

== Notable work ==
Rentschler's 2014 article called "Rape Culture and the Feminist Politics of Social Media" provides an overview of how a younger generation of feminists is combating rape culture primarily through social media. According to the paper, this movement has given more attention to street harassment, rape jokes and in some cases sexual assault than what is often present in reports by the police, mainstream news media and school authorities. Rentschler notes that some women are posting pictures of their harassers, often taken with their cell phones, out of solidarity and so that other women can be forewarned. She goes on to argue that such practices can reduce the feelings of victimization and helplessness. This leads to the statement that younger women are more likely to rely on their cell phones as personal devices of safety than pepper spray and whistles.

In 2019, Rentschler provided testimony in support of the Nova Scotia Registrar of Motor Vehicles and their previous decision to revoke a license plate bearing the last name of its owner Lorne Grabher. She said "as someone seeing this licence plate, you would have no idea this is a name" and argued that its approval would lead to conditions that are conducive to sexual harassment.

Rentschler's first book called Second Wounds: Victim's Rights and the Media in the U.S. was published by Duke University Press in 2011. Second Wounds focuses on sensationalized reports that cover crime stories in a way that is alienating toward victims. Examples of this include stories that give undue publicity to the perpetrator. Rentschler's work explores this in the context of secondary victimization in which survivors of sexual assault can have their trauma exacerbated by institutional neglect on the part of police and court officers. Her second book, Girlhood and the Politics of Place was released in 2016 under a Creative Commons license. In between the two publications, Rentschler discussed the 1964 murder of Kitty Genovese as a topic for upcoming work about the bystander effect.

== Personal views ==
Rentschler advocates for an anti-violence rather than a crime control model in reducing crime. This means that people can learn about the sources of certain social problems and the necessary social steps for prevention, to reduce the chances of the crime occurring in the first place. One example is feminist intervention in domestic violence; by using media such as television commercials, and posters on college campuses offering help for those in need, people may be more likely to seek assistance and become more informed of the issues, which can be a step forward in reducing its overall incidence.

== Published works ==
Books

- Girlhood Studies and the Politics of Place: Contemporary Paradigms of Research. Under contract at Berghahn Press, with co-editor Claudia Mitchell (2016).
- Second Wounds: Victims' Rights and the Media in the U.S. Durham, NC: Duke University Press, 2011.

Articles

- "Rape Culture and the Feminist Politics of Social Media" accepted for publication in Girlhood Studies: An International Journal, for special issue 6(2) (2013).
- "Distributed Activism: Domestic Violence and Feminist Media Infrastructure in the Fax Age" accepted for publication in Communication, Culture & Critique 8:2 (2014).
- "On S'En Câlisse, La Loi Speciale: The Music Festival that Wasn't" Wi: Journal of Mobile Media, (2012). Invited contribution, 1500 words. http://wi.mobilities.ca/onsen- calisse-la-loi-special-the-music-festival-that-wasn't/ Republished as "Grab your drum and join us: Montreal's street music festival like no other" June 6, 2012, at rabble.ca: and-join-us-montreals-street-music-festival-no-other Republished July 1, 2012, at nomorepotlucks.org: http://nomorepotlucks.org/site/on-sen-calisse-la-loi-speciale-the-music-festivalthat- wasn't
- "An Urban Physiognomy of the 1964 Kitty Genovese Murder," Space & Culture 14:3 (2011), 310–329.
- "The Physiognomic Turn," International Journal of Communication 4 (2010): 1–6. "Trauma Training and the Reparative Work of Journalism." Cultural Studies 24:4 (2010): 447–477.
- "Sarah Palin, Sexual Anomalies and Historical Analogues." Liminalities: A Journal of Performance Studies 4:3 (November 2008), 1863 words. Available online at: http://liminalities.net/4-3/palin.html.
- "Risky Assignments: Sexing 'Security' in Hostile Environment Reporting." Feminist Media Studies 7:3 (2007), 257–279.
- "Victims' Rights and the Struggle over Crime in the Media." Canadian Journal of Communication, 32:2 (2007), 239–259.
- "Review Essay: Militarized Media at War and at Home." The Communication Review 9:1(2006), 143–154, non-refereed.
- "Introduction: States of Insecurity and the Gendered Politics of Fear" (co-authored with Carol A. Stabile) National Women's Studies Association Journal 17:3 (2005), viixxv.
- "Witnessing: U.S. Citizenship and the Vicarious Experience of Suffering" Media, Culture and Society 26:2 (2004), 296–304. "Designing Fear: Environmental Security and Violence against Women" Cultural Studies: A Research Annual 5 (2000), 281–307.
- "Women's Self-Defense: Physical Education for Everyday Life" Women's Studies Quarterly 26:1 (1999), 152–161.

Book Chapters

- "Technologies of Bystanding: Learning to See Like a Bystander" accepted for publication in Shaping Inquiry in Culture, Communication and Media Studies, ed. Barbie Zelizer. Routledge (October 3, 2013).
- "From Danger to Trauma: Affective Labor and the Journalistic Discourse of Witness." In Media Witnessing: Testimony in the Age of Mass Communication, ed. Paul Frosh
- "Securing Profits." In Collective Action: A Bad Subjects Anthology, ed. Joel Schalit and Megan Shaw Prelinger. London: Pluto Press (2004), pp. 198–205.
- "Designing Fear: How Environmental Security Protects Property at the Expense of People." In Foucault, Cultural Studies and Governmentality, eds. Jack Bratich, Jeremy Packer and Cameron McCarthy. Albany: SUNY Press (2003), pp. 243–272.
- "Expanding the Definition of Media Activism." In Blackwell Companion to Media Studies, ed. Angharad Valdivia. Malden, MA: Blackwell Publishers (2003), pp. 529–547.

Edited Journals

- "Doing Feminism: Event, Archive, Techné." Co-editor, with Samantha Thrift, of a special issue of Feminist Theory, 17:1 (forthcoming April 2016).
- "Cultural Studies and the Re-Description of Girlhood in Crisis." Co-editor, with Claudia Mitchell, of a special issue of Girlhood Studies: An Interdisciplinary Journal. 6:2 (forthcoming October 2013).
- "States of Insecurity and the Gendered Politics of Fear." Co-editor, with Carol Stabile, of a special issue of the NWSA Journal 17:3 (2005).

Reviews

- Review of Jennifer Petersen's Murder, Media and the Politics of Public Feelings. (2013). International Journal of Communication 7 (2013): 1514–1517.
- "Widows, Mothers and War Children" review of Cynthia Enloe's Nimo's War, Emma's War: Making Feminist Sense of the Iraq War. London Times Higher Education Supplement, August 26, 2010.

Other Publications

- "The Confederate Flag in East Montreal" Bad Subjects #74 (January 2006). Online at https://web.archive.org/web/20160217090520/http://bad.eserver.org/issues/2006/74/rentschler.html.
- "United We Stand: Fresh Hoagies Daily" with Carol Stabile and Jonathan Sterne, Bad Subjects #59 (February 2002). Online at https://web.archive.org/web/20150401015038/http://bad.eserver.org/issues/2002/59/rentschler.html.
- "Securing Profits," Bad Subjects #48 (March 2000). Online at https://web.archive.org/web/20150405180621/http://bad.eserver.org/issues/2000/48/rentschler.html.
- "Perpetrate My Fist: Women's Self-Defense as Physical Education for Everyday Life," Bad Subjects #22 (October 1995). Online at https://web.archive.org/web/20160127055052/http://bad.eserver.org/issues/1995/22/rentschler.html.

Reprinted Articles

- "Perpetrate My Fist! Women's Self-Defense as Physical Education for Everyday Life," Rain and Thunder: A Radical Feminist Journal of Activism and Discussion (Winter 2003), 6–8.

== See also ==
- Kim Sawchuk
