= Narcotization =

Narcotization may mean:

- Narcotics, administration of narcotic drugs
- Narcotizing dysfunction, a theory about the social consequence of mass media
