= Media studies =

Field of study that deals with media

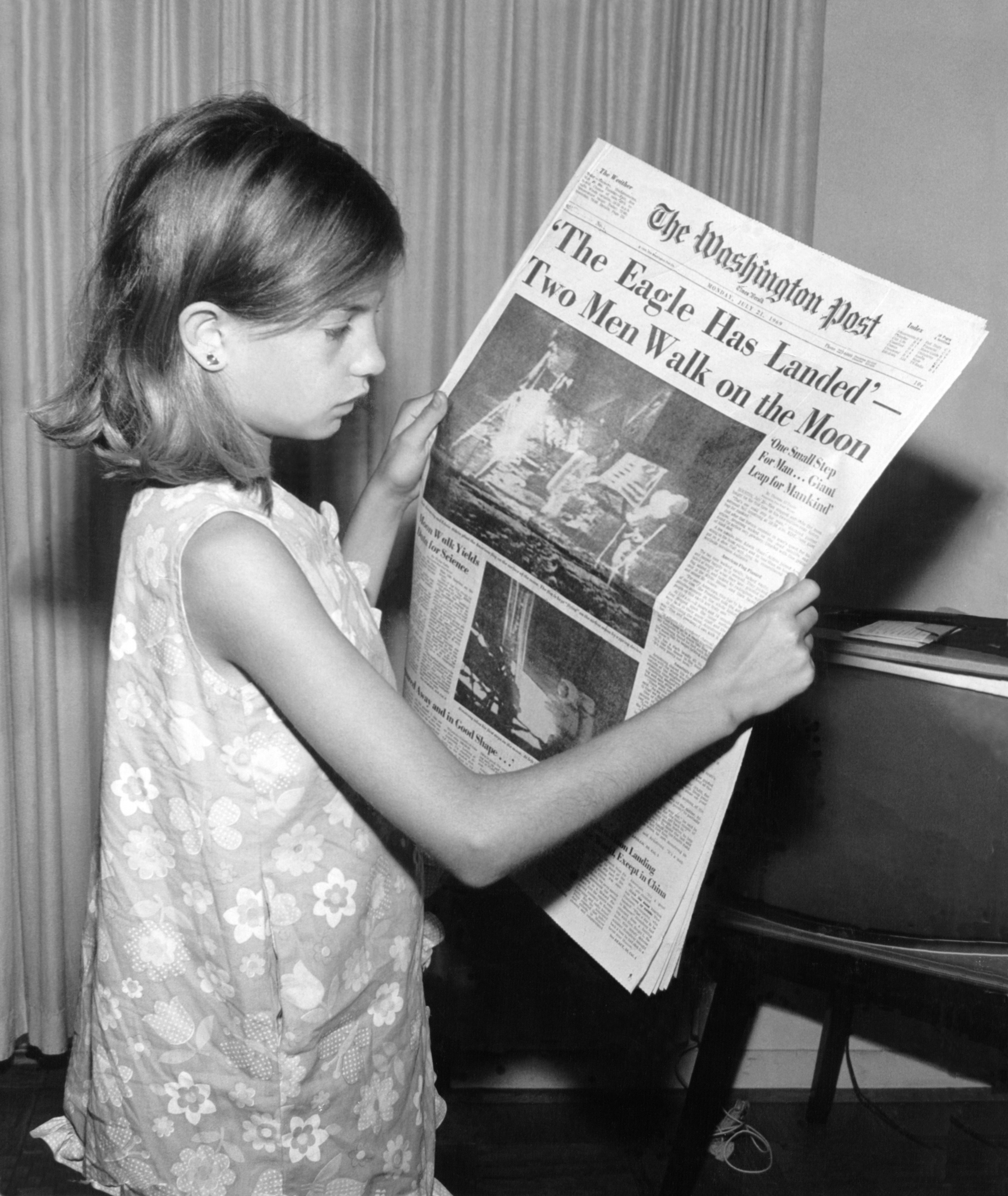
A girl with a newspaper featuring landing on the Moon (July 1969)

Media studies is an academic discipline and field of study that deals with the content, history, and effects of the mass media. Media studies may draw on traditions from both the social sciences and the humanities, but it mostly draws from its core disciplines of mass communication, communication, communication sciences, and communication studies.

Researchers may also develop and employ theories and methods from disciplines. There are many different areas of disciplines that are involved in the study of media coming from culture, psychology, politics, and the economy. These include cultural studies, rhetoric (including digital rhetoric), philosophy, literary theory, psychology, political science, political economy, economics, sociology, anthropology, social theory, art history and criticism, film theory, and information theory.

== Origin ==
Former priest and American educator John Culkin was one of the earliest advocates for implementing a media studies curriculum in schools. He believed students should be capable of scrutinizing mass media, and valued the application of modern communication techniques within the education system. Culkin wanted to study the effect of media on young students, highlighting how much more time they spent watching various television programs than studying. He shared how there was a significant cultural gap between those who had grown up in the “electronic age”, which included television. Older generations were more used to analog style media. Culkin is also credited with advising creators of the television show “Sesame Street”, due to his insights on how media could potentially affect children. In 1975, Culkin introduced the first media studies M.A. program in the U.S., which has since graduated more than 2,000 students.

Culkin was also responsible for bringing his colleague and fellow media scholar Marshall McLuhan to Fordham University and, subsequently, for founding the Center for Understanding Media, which became the New School program. The Center for Understanding Media is credited with introducing students to the subject area of communication, education, and the arts. The course work included conducting research and carrying out various projects within these subjects. Both educators are recognized as pioneers in the discipline, credited with paving the way for media studies curriculum within the education system.

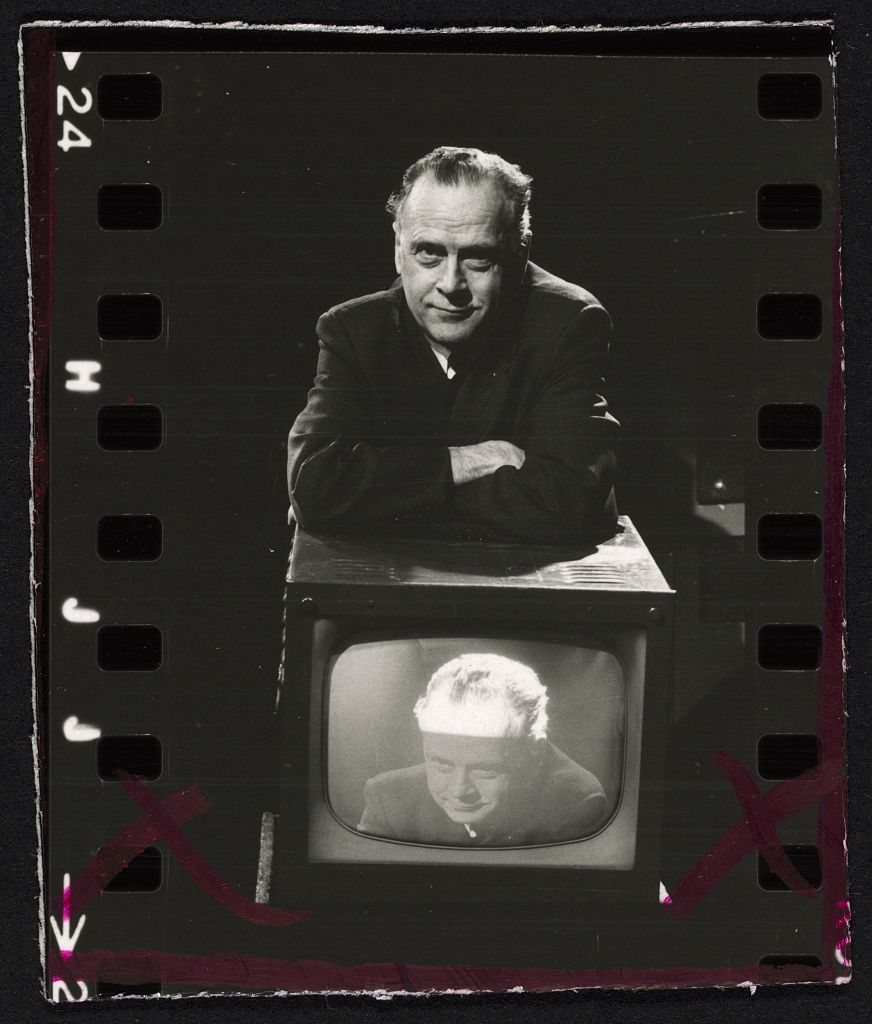
Father of media studies, Marshall McLuhan

== Global contributions and perspectives on media studies ==
=== Canada ===
In his book "Understanding Media, The Extensions of Man", media theorist Marshall McLuhan suggested that "the medium is the message", and that all human artefacts and technologies are media. His book introduced the usage of terms such as "media" into our language, along with other precepts, among them "global village" and "Age of Information". A medium is anything that mediates our interaction with the world or other humans. McLuhan wanted to investigate how media shaped people within society, drawing from examples in the past and present, as well as potential implications for the future. Given this perspective, media studies are not restricted to just media of communication but all forms of technology. Media and their users form an ecosystem, and the study of this ecosystem is known as media ecology. Media ecology also holds that our environment ultimately changes as a result of technology. Griffin, Ledbetter, and Sparks elaborate on this theory in their book, stating "...adding smartphones to a family doesn't create a 'family plus smartphones.' The technology changes the family into something different than what it was before."

McLuhan says that the "technique of fragmentation that is the essence of machine technology" shaped the restructuring of human work and association, and that "the essence of automation technology is the opposite". He uses an example of the electric light to make this connection and to explain how "the medium is the message". The electric light is pure information, a medium without a message unless it is used to spell out a verbal ad or a name. A characteristic of all media is that the "content" of any medium is always another medium. For example, the content of writing is speech, the written word is the content of print, and print is the content of the telegraph. The change that the medium or technology introduces into human affairs is the "message". If the electric light is used for a Friday night football game or to light up a desk, it could be argued that the content of the electric light is these activities. The fact that it is the medium that shapes and controls the form of human association and action makes it the message. The electric light is overlooked as a medium of communication because it lacks content. It is not until the electric light is used to spell a brand name that it is recognized as a medium. Like radio and other mass media, electric light eliminates time and space constraints in human association, fostering deeper involvement. McLuhan compared the "content" to a juicy piece of meat being carried by a burglar to distract the "watchdog of the mind". The effect of the medium is made stronger because it is given another media "content". The content of a movie is a book, play, or maybe even an opera. At first, McLuhan was ostracized and misunderstood by his academic peers for his radical commentary on media, but praised by artists, businesspeople, and the youth. His findings within this area helped guide many industries including marketing, psychology, and management, as he shared how media has the power to activate all five senses.

McLuhan discusses media as "hot" or "cold" and touches on the principle that distinguishes them. A hot medium (i.e., radio or a movie) extends a single sense in "high definition". High definition refers to the state of being well-filled with data. A cool medium (e.g., a telephone or television) is considered "low definition" because it provides only a small amount of information and leaves much to be filled in. Hot media are low in participation, because they give one most of the information while excluding certain information. Meanwhile, cool media are high in participation because they inclusively provide information but rely on the viewer to fill in the blanks. McLuhan’s analysis of the 1960 presidential election changed how presidential campaigns were conducted, even today. For example, people who tuned into the radio ( a “cool medium”) were not as moved by campaign speeches as opposed to people who viewed them through the television ( a “hot medium”). McLuhan used lecturing as an example of hot media and seminars as an example of low media. Using a hot medium in a hot or cool culture makes a difference.

In his book, Empire and Communications, University of Toronto professor Harold Innis highlighted media technologies as a powerful contributor to the rise and collapse of empires. Innis' theory of media bias utilizes historical evidence to argue that a medium will be biased towards either time or space. He claims that this inherent bias will reveal a medium's significance to the development of its civilization. Innis identifies media biased towards time as a medium durable in character like clay, stone, or parchment. Time-biased media are heavy and difficult to relocate, which keeps their message centralized and thus maintains economic and social control within the hands of a hierarchical authority structure. He defines media in favor of space as a lighter, more transferable medium like papyrus. Opposite to media in favor of time, Innis explains that the transferable quality of media biased towards space permits civilizations to expand more quickly across vast areas, thus benefiting the growth of sectors like trade. Space biased media influences an empire to decentralize its power and widen its reach of influence. Though these biases compete with each other, Innis argued that an empire requires the presence of both time and space-biased media to succeed as a lasting civilization.

=== France ===
One prominent French media critic is the sociologist Pierre Bourdieu, who wrote books like On Television (New Press, 1999). Bourdieu asserts that television provides far less autonomy (or freedom) than we think. From his perspective, the market (which creates a hunt for higher advertising revenue) not only imposes uniformity and banality but also necessitates a form of invisible censorship. For example, television producers often "pre-interview" participants in news and public affairs programs to ensure that they will speak in simple, attention-grabbing terms. When the search for viewers leads to an emphasis on the sensational and the spectacular, people with complex or nuanced views are not allowed a hearing.

Bourdieu is also remembered in the discipline for his theory of the habitus. In his work Outline of a Theory of Practice (Bourdieu, 1977), Bourdieu claims that an audience's media preferences are shaped by their social context. How an individual interprets and engages with their surroundings, or their habitus, is defined by the lasting and transferable elements of character that structure their consumer preferences. Bourdieu explains that, though durable, the habitus is not set in stone; it instead acts as a "strategy-generating principle" allowing individuals to navigate new and unfamiliar situations.

Bourdieu expanded on the theory of the habitus, introducing his famous term, cultural capital. According to the French sociologist, cultural capital signifies an individual's socially or culturally valuable skills and knowledge. He claims that these competencies are developed through one's upbringing and access to education resources, and can be unconsciously shaped by their social environment. Bourdieu highlights this accumulation of competencies as a determining factor in one's life chances. One's cultural capital, such as a university degree, can lead to more opportunities, thus linking the concept to both economic and social capital. Bourdieu explains that it is through the content of the different capitals that the habitus will structure an individual's consumer taste.

=== Germany ===
In Germany, two main branches of media theory or media studies can be identified.

The first major branch of media theory has its roots in the humanities and cultural studies, such as film studies ("Filmwissenschaft"), theater studies ("Theaterwissenschaft"), German language and literature studies ("Germanistik"), and Comparative Literature Studies ("Komparatistik"). This branch has broadened substantially since the 1990s, leading to the development and establishment of culturally based media studies (often emphasized more recently under the disciplinary title Medienkulturwissenschaft) in Germany.

This plurality of perspectives makes it difficult to pinpoint a single site of origin for the branch of Medienwissenschaft. While the Frankfurt-based theatre scholar Hans-Theis Lehmann's term "post-dramatic theater" points directly to the increased blending of co-presence and mediatized material in the German theater (and elsewhere) since the 1970s, the field of theater studies from the 1990s onwards at the Freie Universität Berlin, led in particular by Erika Fischer-Lichte, showed particular interest in how theatricality influenced notions of performativity in aesthetic events. Within the field of Film Studies, both Frankfurt and Berlin were again dominant in developing new perspectives on moving-image media. Heide Schlüpman in Frankfurt and Gertrud Koch [de], first in Bochum then in Berlin, were key theorists contributing to an aesthetic theory of the cinema (Schlüpmann) as dispositif and the moving image as a medium, particularly in the context of illusion (Koch). Many scholars who became known as media scholars in Germany were originally scholars of German, such as Friedrich Kittler, who taught at the Humboldt-Universität zu Berlin and completed both his dissertation and habilitation in the field of Germanistik. One of the early publications in this branch of media studies was a volume edited by Helmut Kreuzer entitled Literature Studies - Media Studies (Literaturwissenschaft – Medienwissenschaft), which summarizes the presentations given at the Düsseldorfer Germanistentag in 1976.

The second branch of media studies in Germany is comparable to Communication Studies. Pioneered by Elisabeth Noelle-Neumann in the 1940s, this branch of study examines mass media, its institutions, and its effects on society and individuals. The German Institute for Media and Communication Policy, founded in 2005 by media scholar Lutz Hachmeister, is one of the few independent research institutions dedicated to issues surrounding media and communications policy.

The term Wissenschaft cannot be directly translated to studies, as it invokes both scientific methods and the humanities. Accordingly, German media theory combines philosophy, psychoanalysis, history, and scientific studies with media-specific research.

=== Russia ===
Within the past few years, there have been many obstacles that Russian journalists have faced. In 2022, the “Law on Discrediting the Army” was passed by the Kremlin, the leading government agency within Russia. This law brought on censorship over Russian journalists, preventing them from reporting any news deemed “unapproved” by the government. The birth of the new censorship law led to the concept of “exiled media”. Exiled media is defined as, “those operating in exile due to repressive actions by their home governments, favouring alternative journalism approaches, and reaching a wider audience that transcends geographic borders”. This type of reporting does happen to cross the lines between journalism and activism, but nonetheless is an important idea to research from an opposing point of view. Exiled media is also characterized by journalists having to conduct reporting from a separate geographic location. This concept is an important aspect of media studies, as it investigates how these journalists combat immense obstacles (censorship) to deliver unbiased reporting.

=== Poland ===
According to the Zeszyty Prasoznawcze, translated to Press Journals in English, one of the "architects" of media studies in Poland is Professor Walery Pisarek. Pisarek spent over 40 years of his career studying how topics such as persuasion, language, and propaganda intersect with media studies and linguistics, specifically in Poland. He was capable of speaking four languages, including Polish, German, Russian, and English. Many of his academic studies were translated into those languages, in addition to French. Originating from the year 1964, Pisarek taught and lectured at various universities such as Jagiellonian University, University of Warsaw, University of Silesia, The Pontifical University of John Paul II. He sought “linguistic correctness”, and wanted to spread these ideas among the youth. This focus on linguistics also led to Pisarek's support of the Polish Language Act, a piece of legislation that protected the Polish language and its use while also promoting the Polish culture and history.

=== United Kingdom ===
Much research in the field of news media studies has been led by the Reuters Institute for the Study of Journalism. Details of the research projects and results are published in the RISJ annual report. In addition to the research performed at the Reuters Institute, media researchers in the United Kingdom have also used comments from the British press to look at their impression of media studies as a topic for study. Researchers Lucy Bennett and Jenny Kidd found a link between the Conservative Party in Britain and the idea that media studies was not an academic field worth studying because it lacked scientific principles and offered little employability for students.

Stuart Hall, a Jamaican-born social scientist, also contributed to the field of media studies through his writings on cultural studies, separate but similar to media studies. Hall's main viewpoint was that the mainstream media as a whole served the beliefs of the rich and powerful within society, an idea that Karl Marx and Antonio Gramsci heavily influenced in his writings. By naming his theory "cultural studies", Hall was able to bring in the cultural element of media studies that he felt was often left out by academics in the field.

=== United States ===
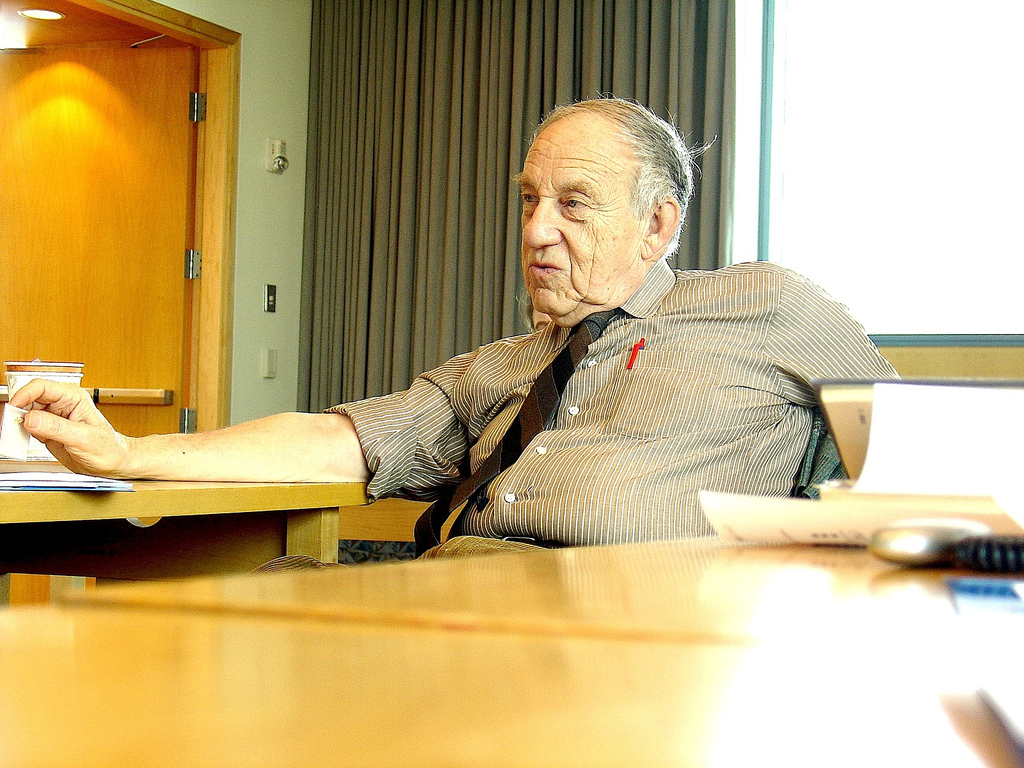
Elihu Katz, a communication researcher and key developer of Uses and Gratifications Theory.

Although the field is commonly called mass communication in American circles, many theories within media studies have evolved in the United States. Elihu Katz's uses and gratifications theory examines why individuals choose to take in media. At its core, the uses and gratifications theory explores how there is no single reason why people consume the messages that they do. Instead, one person consumes specific media for different reasons than another person may consume the same media. Some possible gratifications include "companionship", "escape", and "information".

A newer theory from the 2010s comes from Danah Boyd and Alice Marwick, who studied how media eliminate borders between contexts. In their joint article, they refer to this as part of a process called 'context collapse'. Context collapse refers to how a media platform can flatten multiple audiences into one and allow information intended for one audience to reach another unintended audience. An individual may present themselves to multiple audiences in various ways, but through context collapse, they are put in front of every audience at the same time and must choose which identity to assume.

In the United States, there is a growing body of research on social media and its use as a communication medium. As social media research is on the rise, many researchers are calling on social media corporations to release data about their services to the public.

== Media studies in education ==
=== Australia ===
Media is studied as a broad subject in most states in Australia. Media studies in Australia was first developed as an area of study in Victorian universities in the early 1960s, and in secondary schools in the mid 1960s.

Today, almost all Australian universities teach media studies. According to the Government of Australia's "Excellence in Research for Australia" report, the leading universities in the country for media studies (which were ranked well above world standards by the report's scoring methodology) are Monash University, QUT, RMIT, University of Melbourne, University of Queensland, and UTS.

In secondary schools, an early film studies course was introduced as part of the Victorian junior secondary curriculum in the mid-1960s. By the early 1970s, an expanded media studies course was being taught. The course became part of the senior secondary curriculum (later known as the Victorian Certificate of Education or "VCE") in the 1980s. It has since become, and continues to be, a strong component of the VCE. Notable figures in the development of the Victorian secondary school curriculum were the long time Rusden College media teacher Peter Greenaway, Trevor Barr (who authored one of the first media text books Reflections of Reality) and later John Murray (who authored The Box in the Corner, In Focus, and 10 Lessons in Film Appreciation).

Today, Australian states and territories that teach media studies at the secondary level are the Australian Capital Territory, the Northern Territory, Queensland, South Australia, Victoria, and Western Australia. Media studies does not appear to be taught at the secondary level in the state of New South Wales.

In Victoria, the VCE media studies course is structured as: Unit 1 – Representation, Technologies of Representation, and New Media; Unit 2 – Media Production, Australian Media Organisations; Unit 3 – Narrative Texts, Production Planning; and Unit 4 – Media Process, Social Values, and Media Influence. Media studies also forms a major part of the primary and junior secondary curriculum, and includes areas such as photography, print media, and television.

Victoria also hosts the peak media teaching body, ATOM, which publishes the magazines Metro and Screen Education.

=== Canada ===
In Canada, media studies and communication studies are incorporated in the same departments and cover a wide range of approaches (from critical theory and organizations to research-creation and political economy, for example). Over time, research developed to employ theories and methods from cultural studies, philosophy, political economy, gender, sexuality and race theory, management, rhetoric, film theory, sociology, and anthropology. Harold Innis and Marshall McLuhan are famous Canadian scholars known for their contributions to media ecology and political economy in the 20th century. They were both important members of the Toronto School of Communication at the time. More recently, the School of Montreal and its founder, James R. Taylor, have made significant contributions to the field of organizational communication by focusing on organizational ontological processes.

In 1945 and 1946, Carleton University and the University of Western Ontario (respectively) created journalism-specific programs or schools. A journalism-specific program was also created at Ryerson in 1950. The first communication programs in Canada were started at Ryerson and Concordia Universities. The Radio and Television Arts program at Ryerson was established in the 1950s, as were the Film, Media Studies/Media Arts, and Photography programs. The Communication Studies Department at Concordia was created in the late 1960s. Ryerson's Radio and Television, Film, Media, and Photography programs were renowned by the mid-1970s, and its programs were being copied by other colleges and universities nationally and internationally. Western University later followed suit, establishing the Faculty of Information and Media Studies. Carleton later expanded upon its school of journalism, introducing the mass communication and media studies program in 1978.

Today, most universities offer undergraduate degrees in Media and Communication Studies. Many Canadian scholars actively contribute to the field, among whom are: Brian Massumi (philosophy, cultural studies), Kim Sawchuk (cultural studies, feminist, ageing studies), Carrie Rentschler (feminist theory), and François Cooren (organizational communication).

=== China ===
There are two universities in China that specialize in media studies. Communication University of China, formerly known as the Beijing Broadcasting Institute, was founded in 1954 and offers media studies. CUC has 15,307 full-time students, including 9,264 undergraduates, 3,512 candidates for doctoral and master's degrees, and 16,780 students in continuing education programs. The other university known for media studies in China is Zhejiang University of Media and Communications (ZUMC) which has campuses in Hangzhou and Tongxiang. Almost 10,000 full-time students are currently studying across more than 50 programs at the 13 Colleges and Schools of ZUMC. Both institutions have produced some of China's brightest television broadcasting talent, as well as leading journalists for magazines and newspapers.

=== Czech Republic ===
There is no university focused on journalism and media studies, but seven public universities have a department of media studies. The three biggest universities are based in Prague (Charles University), Brno (Masaryk University), and Olomouc (Palacký University). There are another nine private universities and colleges that have a media studies department.

=== France ===
Numerous French post-secondary institutions offer courses in communications and media studies at both the undergraduate and graduate levels. Media and communications programs at ESCP Business School, Paris Institute of Political Studies, and Grenoble Alpes University center around the study of journalism and other multimedia content, teaching media creation and management strategies.

=== Germany ===
Medienwissenschaften is currently one of the most popular courses of study at universities in Germany, with many applicants mistakenly assuming that studying it will automatically lead to a career in TV or other media. There is a heavy emphasis on the theoretical and analytical study of media as it relates to culture. Marburg University, one of the leading institutions in terms of media studies, offers a bachelor’s program that investigates the fields of film, television, and other forms of digital media. Many applicants mistakenly assume that studying it will automatically lead to a career in TV or other media, but there is more involved than people think. This has led to widespread disillusionment, with students blaming the universities for offering highly theoretical course content. The universities maintain that practical journalistic training is not the aim of the academic studies they offer.

=== India ===
Media Studies is a fast-growing academic field in India, with several dedicated departments and research institutes. With a view to making the best use of communication facilities for information, publicity, and development, the Government of India in 1962-63 sought the advice of the Ford Foundation/UNESCO team of internationally known mass communication specialists, who recommended setting up a national institute for training, teaching, and research in mass communication. Anna University was the first university to start a Master of Science in Electronic Media program. It offers a five-year integrated program and a two-year program in Electronic Media. The Department of Media Sciences was started in January 2002, branching off from the UGC's Educational Multimedia Research Centre (EMMRC). The National Institute of Open Schooling, the world's largest open schooling system, offers Mass Communication as a subject of study at the senior secondary level. All the major universities in the country have mass media and journalism studies departments, including Asian College of Journalism, Chennai; Indian Institute of Mass Communication, New Delhi; and Xavier Institute of Communications, O. P. Jindal Global University - Delhi, Mumbai, Parul University, Vadodara, Amity University, Jawaharlal Neheru University, Apeejay Institute of Mass Communications, Brainware University Kolkata, and others. The Centre for the Study of Developing Societies (CSDS) in Delhi has media studies as an emphasis.

=== Netherlands ===
In the Netherlands, media studies is split into several academic courses, such as (applied) communication sciences, communication and information sciences, communication and media, media and culture or theater, and film and television sciences. While communication sciences focuses on how people communicate, whether mediated or unmediated, media studies tends to narrow communication to just mediated communication.

Communication sciences (or a derivative thereof) can be studied at Erasmus University Rotterdam, Radboud University, Tilburg University, University of Amsterdam, University of Groningen, University of Twente, Roosevelt Academy, University of Utrecht, VU University Amsterdam, and Wageningen University and Research Centre.

Media studies (or a similar program) is offered at the University of Amsterdam, VU University Amsterdam, Erasmus University Rotterdam, University of Groningen, University of Maastricht, and the University of Utrecht.

Nine Dutch universities collaborate in the overarching Netherlands Research school for Media Studies (RMeS), which acts as a platform for graduate students to build connections within the media studies discipline and to represent Dutch media scholars on an international level.

=== New Zealand ===
Media studies in New Zealand is a healthy discipline, mainly due to renewed activity in the country's film industry, and is taught at both secondary and tertiary education institutes. Media studies in NZ can be regarded as a singular success, with the subject well-established in the tertiary sector (such as Screen and Media Studies at the University of Waikato; Media Studies, Victoria University of Wellington; Film, Television and Media Studies, University of Auckland; Media Studies, Massey University; Communication Studies, University of Otago).

Different courses can offer students a range of specializations, such as cultural studies, media theory and analysis, practical film-making, journalism, and communications studies. Media Studies has been a nationally mandated and very popular subject in secondary (high) schools, taught over three years in a structured, developmental fashion, with Scholarship in Media Studies available to academically gifted students. According to the New Zealand Ministry of Education Subject Enrollment figures, 229 New Zealand schools offered Media Studies as a subject in 2016, representing more than 14,000 students.

=== Pakistan ===
In Pakistan, media studies programs are widely offered. International Islamic University has the oldest department in the country, now called the "Department of Media and Communication Studies". Later on, the University of Karachi and the Federal Urdu University of Arts, Science, and Technology established departments of mass communication in 2002. Peshawar University, BZU Multaan, Islamia University Bahwalpur also started communication programs. Now, newly established universities are also offering mass communication programs, in which the University of Gujrat emerged as a leading figure. Bahria University, established by the Pakistan Navy, also offers a BS in media studies.

=== Switzerland ===
In Switzerland, media and communication studies are offered by several higher education institutions, including the International Institute in Geneva, Zurich University of Applied Sciences, University of Lugano, University of Fribourg, and others. The Swiss programs study current trends and strategies used by media corporations, while examining their influence and consequences on modern day society.

=== United Kingdom ===
In the United Kingdom, media studies developed in the 1960s from the academic study of English and, more broadly, from literary criticism. The key date, according to Andrew Crisell, is 1959:

When Joseph Trenaman left the BBC's Further Education Unit to become the first holder of the Granada Research Fellowship in Television at Leeds University. Soon after in 1966, the Centre for Mass Communication Research was founded at Leicester University, and degree programs in media studies began to sprout at polytechnics and other universities during the 1970s and 1980s.

James Halloran at the University of Leicester is credited with influencing the development of media studies and communication studies, as the head of the university's Centre for Mass Communication Research and the founder of the International Association for Media and Communication Research. Media Studies is now taught all over the UK. It is taught at Key Stages 1–3, Entry Level, GCSE, and at A level; the Scottish Qualifications Authority also offers formal qualifications at several different levels. It is offered by a wide range of exam boards, including AQA and WJEC.

As mentioned earlier, much research in the field of news media studies has been led by the Reuters Institute for the Study of Journalism, a leading news media research institution in the United Kingdom. The Institute focuses on journalism and news media as topics of study.

=== United States ===
Mass communication, communication studies, or simply 'communication' are names that are used far more frequently than "media studies" for academic departments in the United States. However, the focus of such programs sometimes excludes certain media—film, book publishing, video games, etc. The title "media studies" may be used to designate film studies and rhetorical or critical theory, or it may appear in combinations like "media studies and communication" to join two fields or emphasize a different focus. It involves the study of many emerging contemporary media and platforms, with social media growing in popularity in recent years. Broadcast and cable television is no longer the primary form of entertainment, with various screens offering worldwide events and pastimes around the clock. This shift has also been associated with practices such as binge-watching and Comfort television, in which viewers return to familiar programs for relaxation or emotional regulation. Many institutions in the United States have since revised their media studies programs.

In 1999, the MIT Comparative Media Studies program started under the leadership of Henry Jenkins. The program has since grown to include a graduate program; it is MIT's largest humanities major, and, following a 2012 merger with the Writing and Humanistic Studies program, now has a roster of twenty faculty, including Pulitzer Prize-winning author Junot Díaz, science fiction writer Joe Haldeman, games scholar T. L. Taylor, and media scholars William Uricchio (a CMS co-founder), Edward Schiappa, and Heather Hendershot. Now named Comparative Media Studies/Writing, the department places an emphasis on what Jenkins and colleagues have termed "applied humanities": it hosts several research groups for civic media, digital humanities, games, computational media, documentary, and mobile design, and these groups are used to provide graduate students with research assistantships to cover the cost of tuition and living expenses. The incorporation of Writing and Humanistic Studies also placed MIT's Science Writing program, Writing Across the Curriculum, and Writing and Communications Center under the same roof.

In 2000, the Department of Media Studies was officially established at the University of Virginia; the interdisciplinary major has grown rapidly, doubling in size by 2011. This is partly thanks to the acquisition of Professor Siva Vaidhyanathan, a cultural historian and media scholar, as well as the Inaugural Verklin Media Policy and Ethics Conference, endowed by the CEO of Canoe Ventures and UVA alumnus David Verklin.

University of California, Irvine had professor Mark Poster, who was one of the first and foremost theorists of media culture in the US and boasted a strong Department of Film & Media Studies. University of California, Berkeley has three institutional structures within media studies that take place in the department of Film and Media (formerly Film Studies Program), including famous theorists as Mary Ann Doane and Linda Williams, the Center for New Media, and a long established interdisciplinary program formerly titled Mass Communications, which recently changed its name to Media Studies. This change eliminated any connotations that may have accompanied the term "mass" in the former title. Until recently, Radford University in Virginia used the title "media studies" for a department that taught practitioner-oriented major concentrations in journalism, advertising, broadcast production, and web design. In 2008, those programs were combined with a previous department of communication (speech and public relations) to create a School of Communication. (A media studies major at Radford still means someone concentrating on journalism, broadcasting, advertising, or Web production.)

Brooklyn College has collaborated with City University of New York to offer graduate studies in television and media since 2015. Currently, the Department of Television and Radio administers an MS in Media Studies, and hosts the Center for the Study of World Television.

== See also ==
- Anthropology of media
- Fan studies
- Innis's time- and space-bias
- Journalism
- Market for loyalties theory
- Mass media
- Mass communication
- McLuhan's tetrad of media effects
- Media culture
- Media echo chamber
- Media ecology
- Media literacy
- Media psychology
- Media-system dependency
- Mediatization (media)
- Narcotizing dysfunction
- Social aspects of television
- Sociology
- The Structural Transformation of the Public Sphere
- Transparency (humanities)
- Uses and gratifications theory
