= Multi-step flow theory =

The multi-step flow theory assumes ideas flow from mass media to opinion leaders before being disseminated to a wider population. This theory was first introduced by sociologist Paul Lazarsfeld et al. in 1944 and elaborated by Elihu Katz and Lazarsfeld in 1955.

The multi-step flow theory offers a larger range of interaction between opinion leaders, information sources and audiences than the two-step model, which argues that information flows from mass media directly to influencers who then directly share it with their audience. This theory accounts more for the social nature of sharing information than the one-step or two-step flow theories. The two-step theory was popular when it was first introduced, but when it became difficult to actually measure opinion leaders' influence on the public's behavior and their opinions, the multi-step theory was developed. The multi-step theory argues that opinion leaders are influenced by multiple sources.

The multi-step flow theory also states opinion leaders are affected more by “elite media” than run-of-the-mill, mass media. This is evident by political opinion leaders receiving their information from unconventional sources such as The Huffington Post, instead of Fox News or MSNBC.

According to the multi-step flow theory, opinion leaders intervene between the “media’s direct message and the audience’s reaction to that message.” Opinion leaders tend to have the great effect on those they are most similar to—based on personality, interests, demographics, or socio-economic factors. These leaders tend to influence others to change their attitudes and behaviors more quickly than conventional media because the audience is able to better identify or relate to an opinion leader than an article in a newspaper or a news program. This was confirmed in Lazarsfeld's 1940 study, The People's Choice, where Lazarsfeld studied Americans' opinions during presidential elections. He found that the mass media did not change people's behaviors much. However, personal attempts did achieve behavioral change. Lasarsfeld did work on another study with Katz published in 1955. This study, “Personal Influence,” proved that opinion leaders look to mass media in their general area of interest, and then share them with their communities.

This media influence theory shows that information dissemination is a social occurrence, which may explain why certain media campaigns do not alter audiences’ attitudes.

An important factor of the multi-step flow theory is how the social influence is modified. Information is affected by the social norms of each new community group that it enters. It is also shaped by conflicting views surrounding it.

== Examples in Society ==
Businesses and politicians have harnessed the power of opinion leaders. An example of this phenomenon is how individuals and companies have turned to Twitter influencers and bloggers to increase hype around specific topics.

During the 2008 Presidential Elections, Sean Combs became an opinion leader for voting with his "Vote or Die" campaign.

Former Vice President, Al Gore also utilized the multi-step flow theory to gain support for his nonprofit, The Climate Project. Gore recruited individuals who were educated on environmental issues and had the ability to be influential in their community and amongst their friends and family. He then trained his opinion leaders on the information he wanted them to disseminate. This ultimately enabled them to educate many Americans about The Climate Project and Gore’s overall ideas about climate change.

== Criticisms ==
One criticism of the multi-step, as well as the two-step and one-step models is that they assume traditional mass media is the only source of information when that isn't always true.
