= Paul Lazarsfeld =

Austrian-American sociologist (1901–1976)

- Paul Lazarsfeld at age 40
- Born: Paul Felix Lazarsfeld; February 13, 1901; Vienna, Austria-Hungary
- Died: August 30, 1976 (aged 75); Newark, New Jersey, US
- Citizenship: Austrian; American
- Spouses: Marie Jahoda (m. 1926; div. 1934); Herta Herzog (div. 1945); Patricia Kendall (m. 1949)
- Children: Lotte Bailyn; Robert Lazarsfeld
- Parents: Robert Lazarsfeld; Sophie Lazarsfeld

Academic background
- Education: University of Vienna (PhD, 1925)
- Thesis: Über die Berechnung der Perihelbewegung des Merkur aus der Einsteinschen Gravitationstheorie (1925)

Academic work
- Discipline: Sociology
- Sub-discipline: Mathematical sociology
- Institutions: Columbia University
- Doctoral students: James Samuel Coleman
- Notable ideas: Limited effects theory; narcotizing dysfunction; two-step flow of communication model
- Influenced: Barney Glaser; Elihu Katz; C. Wright Mills

Paul Felix Lazarsfeld (February 13, 1901 – August 30, 1976) was an Austrian-American sociologist and mathematician. The founder of Columbia University's Bureau of Applied Social Research, he exerted influence over the techniques and the organization of social research. "It is not so much that he was an American sociologist," one colleague said of him after his death, "as it was that he determined what American sociology would be." Lazarsfeld said that his goal was "to produce Paul Lazarsfelds". He was a founding figure in 20th-century empirical sociology.

== Early life ==
Lazarsfeld was born to Jewish parents in Vienna: his mother was the Adlerian therapist Sophie Lazarsfeld, and his father Robert was a lawyer. He attended the University of Vienna, eventually receiving a doctorate in mathematics (his doctoral dissertation dealt with mathematical aspects of Einstein's gravitational theory) in 1925. In the 1920s, he moved in the same circles as the Vienna Circle of philosophers, including Otto Neurath and Rudolf Carnap, and served as a "socialist activist". He came to sociology through his expertise in mathematics and quantitative methods, participating in several early quantitative studies, including what was possibly the first scientific survey of radio listeners, in 1930–1931. In 1926 he married the sociologist Marie Jahoda. Together with Hans Zeisel they wrote a now-classical study of the social impact of unemployment on a small community: Die Arbeitslosen von Marienthal (1932; English: The sociography of an unemployed community, 1971).

== Coming to America ==
The Marienthal study attracted the attention of the Rockefeller Foundation, leading to a two-year traveling fellowship to the United States. From 1933 to 1935, Lazarsfeld worked with the Federal Emergency Relief Administration and toured the United States, making contacts and visiting the few universities that had programs related to empirical social science research. It was during this time that Lazarsfeld met Luther Fry at the University of Rochester (which resulted in the inspiration for the research done in Personal Influence, written some twenty years later) and Robert S. Lynd, who had written the Middletown study. Lynd would come to play a central role in helping Lazarsfeld emigrate to the United States, and would recommend him for the directorships of the Newark Center and the Princeton Office of Radio Research. Lazarsfeld contacted the Psychological Corporation, a non-profit organization devoted to bringing the techniques of applied psychology to business, and proposed a number of projects that were rejected as not having enough commercial value or being too involved. He also helped John Jenkins, an applied psychologist at Cornell University, translate an introduction to statistics Lazarsfeld had written for his students in Vienna (Say It With Figures). Finally, he pursued research into the ideas presented in the widely read "The Art of Asking Why" (1935), which explained Lazarsfeld's concept of "reason analysis".

== Newark ==
At the end of the fellowship in 1935, with a return to Vienna made untenable by the political climate, Lazarsfeld decided to remain in America, and secured an appointment as the director of student relief work for the National Youth Administration, headquartered at the University of Newark (now, the Newark campus of Rutgers University). A year later, he established an institute in Newark along the lines of his Vienna Research Center, institutionalizing the marginal field of opinion research that Lazarsfeld felt was his most important contribution. Lazarsfeld saw his institute as an important bridge between European and American models of research, and was willing to place the future of his institutes before his personal career. For example, in order to make the Newark Center seem to have a larger staff, Lazarsfeld published under a pseudonym. The Newark Center was clearly successful in generating interest in both empirical studies and in Lazarsfeld as a research manager. The research carried on at the center between 1935 and 1937 (including research for the Mirra Komarovsky book The Unemployed Man and His Family) demonstrated that empirical research could be of help and of interest to both business and academia. Under "Administrative Research", as he called his framework, a large, expert staff worked at a research center, deploying a battery of social-scientific investigative methods—mass market surveys, statistical analysis of data, focus group work, etc.—to solve specific problems for specific clients. Funding came not only from the university, but also from commercial clients who contracted out research projects. This produced studies such as two long reports to the dairy industry on factors influencing the consumption of milk; and a questionnaire to let people assess whether they shop too much (for Cosmopolitan magazine).

While at Newark, Lazarsfeld was appointed head of the Princeton Office of the Radio Research Project, which was later moved to Columbia. In 1937, he first tried to have the project moved to Newark, and when that request was turned down, split his time between the project and his institute in Newark. He feared (correctly, perhaps) that the institute would fail without his management. At the Project, Lazarsfeld expanded the aims postulated by the assistant directors, Hadley Cantril and Frank Stanton, and in a special issue of the Journal of Applied Psychology in February 1939, edited by Lazarsfeld, he tied together some of the varied research the Project was engaged in. Lazarsfeld felt this publication was necessary because "no central theory was visible, and we began hearing rumors that important people questioned whether we knew what we were doing" (Lazarsfeld, 1969). But in the spring of 1939, the Rockefeller foundation officers were still unconvinced and "required more solid evidence of achievement" before they would renew funding. The result was Radio and the Printed Page. These two publications did much to consolidate and define the field of communication.

== Columbia ==
After a falling out with Cantril, which may have been financial in nature, the Radio Research Project moved to Columbia University, where it grew into the acclaimed Bureau for Social Research. At Columbia, the direction of research leaned toward voting, and a study of the November 1940 vote was published as The People's Choice, a book that had a substantial effect on the nature of political research.

During the 1940s, mass communication entrenched itself as a field in its own right. Lazarsfeld's interest in the persuasive elements of mass media became a topic of great importance during the Second World War and this resulted in increased attention, and funding, for communication research. By the 1950s, there were increased concerns about the power of the mass media, and with Elihu Katz, Lazarsfeld published Personal Influence, which propounded the theory of a two-step flow of communication, opinion leadership, and of community as filters for the mass media. Along with Robert K. Merton, he popularized the idea of a narcotizing dysfunction of media, along with its functional roles in society.

His contributions include: the two-step flow of communication from media to opinion leaders and then others (multi-step flow theory); his research on the characteristics of opinion leaders; diffusion of medical innovations; uses and gratifications of receivers from day time radio soap operas, etc. His research led to a marriage between interpersonal communication and mass communication.

In 1956, he was elected as a Fellow of the American Statistical Association.

Lazarsfeld died in 1976. His mother Sophie survived him by almost a month, dying at age 95. With Marie Jahoda, he had a daughter, Lotte Franziska Lazarsfeld (born 1930), later Lotte Bailyn, who became a professor of management at the Massachusetts Institute of Technology. He divorced Marie in 1930 and married his colleague Herta Herzog in 1936. The marriage lasted until 1945. With his third wife, married in 1949, Patricia Kendall, he had a son, Robert Lazarsfeld (born 1953), who was professor of mathematics at Stony Brook University, and who published Positivity in Algebraic Geometry (Springer) in 2004.

== Influence ==
Lazarsfeld's many contributions to sociological method have earned him the title of the "founder of modern empirical sociology". Lazarsfeld invented the latent class model for clustering multivariate discrete data. He also made great strides in statistical survey analysis, panel methods, latent structure analysis, and contextual analysis. He is also considered a co-founder of mathematical sociology. Many of his ideas have been so influential as to now be considered self-evident. He is also noted for developing the two-step flow of communication model.

Lazarsfeld also made significant contributions by training many younger sociologists. One of Lazarsfeld's biographers, Paul Neurath, writes that there are "dozens of books and hundreds of articles by his students and the students of his students, all of which still breathe the spirit of this man's work". One of Lazarsfeld's successful students was Barney Glaser—propounder of grounded theory (GT)—the world's most quoted method for analyzing qualitative data. Index formations and qualitative mathematics were subjects taught by Lazarsfeld and are important components of the GT method according to Glaser. James Samuel Coleman, an important contributor to social theories of education and a future president of the American Sociological Association, was also a student of Lazarsfeld's at Columbia.

Paul Lazarsfeld's most important contribution, in his own opinion as well, was the beta version of a research institution that was based within a university setting. He started his journey of institute creation overseas in Vienna. He then proceeded to create two within the United States—most importantly with the Bureau of Applied Social Research at Columbia University. The most prestigious era of this Bureau was when Lazarsfeld was the director, associate director, as well as an active researcher in the Bureau. It was during this time that the Bureau was able to control and distribute almost a million dollars and produce studies a sundry. This was his most important contribution because it was able to create a business plan for the production of knowledge from a standpoint that was non–profit yet not acquiring debt. This was significant because it was a model that was replicated at other universities—making the production of research affordable and organized.

Another important contribution of Paul Lazarsfeld was his advancement to media effects research that he was able to bring into fruition. Lazarsfeld's "most important methodological contributions were the Lazarsfeld-Stanton Program Analyzer and focus group interviewing" according to Everett Rogers. The Lazarsfeld–Stanton Program Analyzer, or "Little Annie" as it was called, provided audience members with a device that had a red button and a green button. When an experimental audience member viewed mediated content, they were able to instantly communicate through the two buttons as to whether what they witnessed was likable or not. The second research method that was used in tandem with Little Annie was focus group interviewing. After using the tool and viewing the artifact, the participants of the study then filled out a questionnaire, and then discussed the content. The tool was a boon because it allowed for broadcast content to be revised and also be rated for effectiveness. This tool was useful to truly measure audience analysis and reception of a message via a mediated channel. These tools produced both qualitative and quantitative data.

His contributions to measurement include innovative survey methods such as the longitudinal panel survey he used in his 1940 study in Erie, OH. He contributed to data analysis with a variety of techniques such as the 2x2 contingency tables, frequency analyses, scatter plots, and mixed methods like focus groups.

Paul Lazarsfeld has been the President of the American Sociological Association (ASA) and the American Association for Public Opinion Research. He received honorary degrees from many universities, including the University of Chicago, Columbia University, the University of Vienna and Sorbonne University. Columbia University's social research center has been renamed after him. The career achievement award of the ASA Methodology section is also named in his honor, as is the top theory award of the American Evaluation Association.

== Criticism ==
Though the research bureau was a major contribution, it was not without flaws. Lazarsfeld emphasized that a research institution is capable of existing in an organized fashion but that the commandeering and leadership really dictated the success of it. Lazarsfeld was successful for nearly two decades; however actors within this particular system could manipulate the machinations of the institution and thus derail the program. Another negative repercussion of having the type of leadership that Lazarsfeld provided was that the organization and its methodology was determined by his preferences—not allowing in this case for statistics to be utilized and that the data sets were unable to be replicated and generalized.

A major portion of Lazarsfeld's research concerned the individual decision-making process and how it was influenced by the mass media. The Marienthal study was an exception, being biased toward the community, but in all the studies carried out in localities after Marienthal (Sandusky, Elmira, and Decatur, for example), the individual was much more clearly the unit of analysis. While Lazarsfeld clearly did not see his own research agenda as the only approach to communication research, others criticized his "administrative research"—paid for by commercial and military funding—as an overwhelming move toward empirical, short–term, effects–based research.

The ascendency of administrative research provided an effective foil for critics. Theodor W. Adorno, who had worked under Lazarsfeld at the Radio Project, came to represent an intellectual tradition that contrasted with Lazarsfeld's own dedication to empiricism and willingness to collaborate with industry. Likewise, Lazarsfeld's focus on empirical discovery rather than grand theory ("abstract empiricism" in the words of C. Wright Mills) was one of the spurs that led Robert K. Merton to develop what he called "theories of the middle range".

In terms of weaknesses, he looked at individuals and missed the larger social structure and the power relations within it. He predominantly worked in the area of administrative research. He did many surveys but was reluctant to generalize his findings to a larger group. Though he found powerful cognitive effects produced by media in his 1940 study, he chose to support the minimal effects hypothesis.

In the end, he thought that his ideas of empirical research had not been as widely received as he might have hoped. In one of his last published papers, "Communication Research and Its Applications: A Postscript" (1976), Lazarsfeld lamented that the tide had turned against empirical research and that "while an increasing number of writers expressed the need [to make 'applications' a topic of research], it certainly was not the subject of popular demand among sociologists."

== Lazarsfeld's work with Robert K. Merton ==
Lazarsfeld was noted for his ability to forge productive collaborations with a wide range of thinkers. One of his most celebrated collaborations was with Robert K. Merton. Both Merton and Lazarsfeld were new faculty members in Columbia University's Department of Sociology appointed in 1941. Merton was seen as a budding theorist, while Lazarsfeld was considered a methodology specialist. Apparently the pair had little contact until Merton and his wife came to dinner at the Lazarsfeld's Manhattan apartment on Saturday evening, November 23, 1941. Upon arrival Lazarsfeld explained to Merton that he had been just asked by the US government's Office of New Facts and Figures to evaluate a radio program. Thus "Merton accompanied Lazarsfeld to the radio studio, leaving their wives in the Lazarsfeld apartment with the uneaten dinner." Lazarsfeld was using the famous Stanton–Lazarsfeld Program–Analyzer, to record the responses of listeners, and in the ensuing interviews they conducted, Merton was instrumental in ensuring questions were properly answered. This was believed to be the start of the "focused group interview", or what we now know as the focus group. It was also the beginning of a rich and influential collaboration in the field of communication studies.

The paper for which Lazarsfeld and Merton are best known is their "Mass Communication, Popular Taste, and Organized Social Action" (1948). Widely anthologized, the paper has been proposed as a canonical text in media studies. Lazarsfeld and Merton set out to understand the burgeoning public interest in problems of the "media of mass communication". After a critical consideration of common and problematic approaches to the mass media—noting that the "sheer presence of these media may not affect our society so profoundly as is widely supposed"—they work their work through three aspects of what they see as the problem. They highlight three "social functions" that cast a long shadow into the present day. The first of these is social status conferral function, or the way that the "mass media confer status on public issues, persons, organizations and social movements". The second function is the "enforcement of social norms", where the mass media uses public exposure of events or behaviour, to expose "deviations from these norms to public view". The third function, and perhaps best known, is the narcotizing dysfunction, in which energies of individuals in society are systematically routed away from organized action—because of the time and attention needed to simply keep up with reading or listening to mass media: "Exposure to this flood of information may serve to narcotize rather than to energize the average reader or listener."

The remainder of Lazarsfeld and Merton's paper discusses structure of ownership and operation of the mass media specific to the US—especially the fact that in the case of magazines, newspapers, and radio, advertising "supports the enterprise": "Big business finances the production and distribution of mass media [...] he who pays the piper generally calls the tune". They point out the ensuing problems of social conformism, and consider the impact upon popular taste (a controversy which rages unabated until the present). The final section of the paper considers a topic of great salience in the post–World War II period, propaganda for social objectives. Here they propose three conditions for rendering such propaganda effective, terming these "monopolization" (the "absence of counter propaganda"), "canalization" (taking established behaviour and enlisting it in a particular direction), and "supplementation" (the reinforcement of mass media messages by face-to-face contact in local organizations). Lazarsfeld and Merton's classic essay has long been criticized as a high point of the dominant effects tradition in communication theory. However, revisionist accounts have now drawn attention to the mix of ideas it contains from "critical" communication traditions, as much as empirical, methodological, and quantitative approaches.

== Bibliography ==
- Katz, Elihu, and Paul F. Lazarsfeld. Personal Influence: The Part Played by People in the Flow of Mass Communications. Glencoe, IL: Free Press, 1966.
- Lazarsfeld, Paul F. Radio and the Printed Page: An Introduction to the Study of Radio and Its Role in the Communication of Ideas. New York: Duell, Sloan, and Pearce, 1940.
- Lazarsfeld, Paul F., Bernard Berelson, and Hazel Gaudet. The People’s Choice: How the Voter Makes up his Mind in a Presidential Campaign. New York: Columbia University Press, 1944.
- Lazarsfeld, Paul F. "An Episode in the History of Social Research: A Memoir." In The Intellectual Migration: Europe and America, 1930–1960, ed. Donald Fleming and Bernard Bailyn 270–337. Cambridge, MA: Harvard University Press, 1969.
- Lazarsfeld, Paul F. and Robert K. Merton, "Mass Communication, Popular Taste, and Organized Social Action", in L. Bryson (ed.), The Communication of Ideas. New York: Harper, 95–118. Reprinted in: John Durham Peters and Peter Simonson (eds), Mass Communication and American Social Thought: Key Texts, 1919–1968. Lanham, MD: Rowman & Littlefield, 2004, pp. 230–241.
- Lazarsfeld, Paul F. Qualitative Analysis; Historical and Critical Essays. Boston: Allyn and Bacon, 1972.

== See also ==
- Hindsight bias
- Statistical survey
- Public opinion
- Two-step flow of communication

== Sources ==
- Hans Zeisel, "The Vienna Years," in Qualitative and Quantitative Social Research: Papers in honor of Paul F. Lazarsfeld, ed. Robert K. Merton, James S. Coleman, and Peter H. Rossi (New York: Free Press, 1979)
- Simonson, Peter, and Weimann, Gabriel, "Critical Research at Columbia", in E. Katz, et al. (eds.), Canonic Texts in Media Research. Cambridge: Polity, 2003, pp. 12–38.
- Paddy Scannell, "The End of the Masses: Merton, Lazarsfeld, Riesman, Katz, USA, 1940s and 1950", in his Media and Communication. London and Thousand Oaks, CA: Sage, 2006, 62–90.
- Wilbur Schramm, "The Beginnings of Communication Study in America: A Personal Memoir", ed. Steven H. Chaffee and Everett M. Rogers (Thousand Oaks, CA: Sage Publications, 1997).
- Fürstenberg, Friedrich, "Knowledge and Action. Lazarsfeld's foundation of social research"; in: Paul Larzarsfeld (1901–1976). La sociologie de Vienne à New York (eds. Jacques Lautman & Bernard-Pierre Lécuyer); Paris-Montréal (Qc.): Éditions L'Harmattan, 423–432; online-Version:
- Morrison, David Edward, Paul Lazarsfeld: The Biography of an Institutional Innovator Doctoral thesis, University of Leicester, 1976; online-version
- Garfinkel, Simson L. Radio Research, McCarthyism and Paul F. Lazarsfeld, Bachelor of Science Thesis, Massachusetts Institute of Technology, 1987; online-version
