= Marie Jahoda =

British Austrian-born psychologist

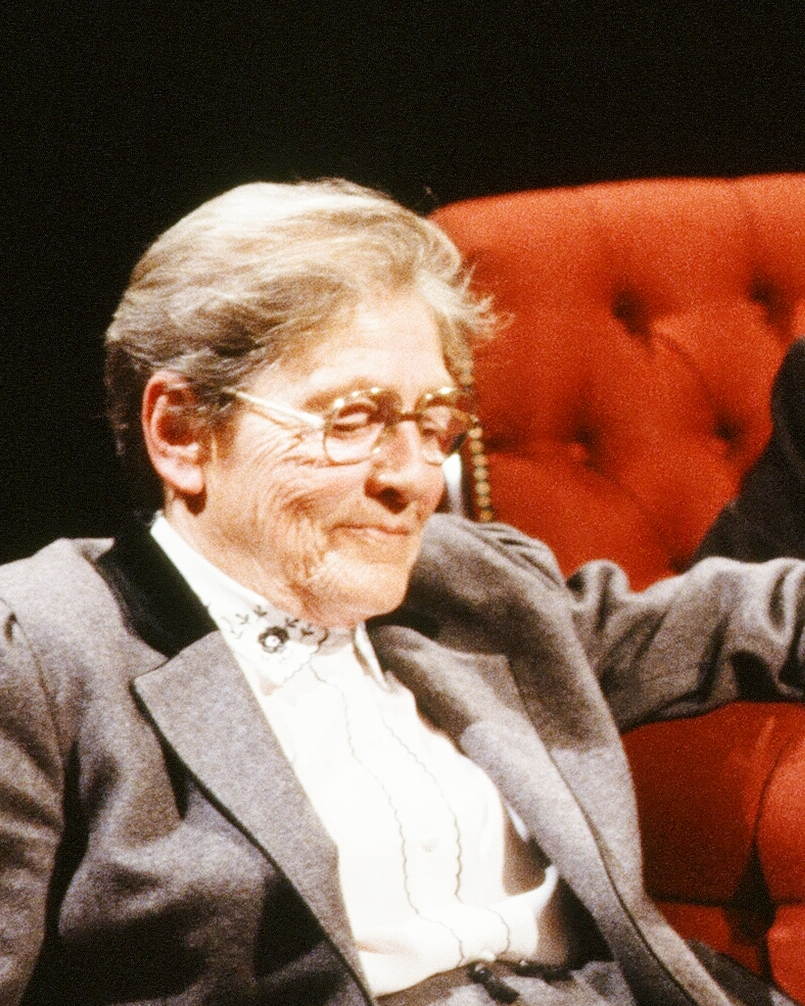
- Jahoda appearing on television discussion programme After Dark in 1988
- Born: 26 January 1907; Vienna, Austria
- Died: 28 April 2001 (aged 94); Sussex, England
- Education: University of Vienna (PhD, 1933)
- Occupation: Social psychologist
- Spouse(s): Paul Lazarsfeld; Austen Albu
- Children: Lotte Franziska Lazarsfeld

Marie Jahoda (26 January 1907 – 28 April 2001) was an Austrian-British social psychologist.

== Biography ==
Jahoda was born in Vienna to a Jewish merchant's family, and like many other psychologists of her time, grew up in Austria where political oppression against socialists was rampant after Engelbert Dollfuss claimed power. Starting in her adolescent years she became engaged in the Austrian Social Democratic Party in ″Red Vienna.″ This was a major influence on her life. She is (among many others) considered as Grande Dame of European socialism.

In 1928, she earned her teaching diploma from the Pedagogical Academy of Vienna, and in 1933 earned her Doctor of Philosophy in Psychology from the University of Vienna. Together with her husband Paul Lazarsfeld and Hans Zeisel, she wrote a now-classic study of the social impact of unemployment on a small community: Die Arbeitslosen von Marienthal (1932; English ed. 1971 – Marienthal: the sociography of an unemployed community – paperback by Transaction Publishers in USA, 2002). Marienthal was an industrial district that suffered very high levels of unemployment in the 1920s, and the research team examined the (often devastating) psychological consequences. These went beyond the obvious hardships associated with financial deprivation, and Jahoda concluded that in modern industrial societies work provides important social benefits, including a sense of personal worth, connection with wider social objectives, and a time structure to their days and weeks.

In 1934, Jahoda divorced Lazarsfeld since he had started a relationship with Herta Herzog in 1932. In 1936, she was imprisoned by the dictatorial regime of Kurt Schuschnigg for her underground work for the socialists. In 1937, after some foreign appeals to release her, she was allowed to leave prison on the condition she leave the country immediately. Her Austrian citizenship was revoked. In fact, however, this might have saved her from worse oppression following the Nazi Anschluss the following year. Jahoda went to England staying there during World War II.

In 1945, she arrived in the United States. During her time there, she worked as a professor of social psychology at the New York University and a researcher for the American Jewish Committee and Columbia University. She contributed significantly to the analysis of the Studies on Prejudice and was co-editor of the third volume of these studies called Anti-Semitism and Emotional Disorder: a Psychological Interpretation, which was published in 1950. Between 1958 and 1965, at what is now Brunel University, she was involved in establishing Psychology degree programmes including the unique four-year, thin-sandwich degree. Jahoda founded the Research Center of Human Relations, and was recruited by the University of Sussex in 1965, where she became Professor of Social Psychology. Later at Sussex University she became consultant, and then visiting professor, at the Science Policy Research Unit. In 1968 she was member of Social Science Research Council (UK).

In 1958, she developed the theory of Ideal Mental Health. Through her work Jahoda identified five categories which, she said, were vital to feelings of well-being (1982, 87). These were: time structure, social contact, collective effort or purpose, social identity or status, and regular activity. She maintained that the unemployed were deprived of all five, and that this accounted for much of the reported mental ill-health among unemployed people. In the 1980s, when unemployment levels were again high, this approach was rather influential, and her Marienthal studies attracted renewed interest: she made many presentations on this topic in Europe. She was at that time working at the Science Policy Research Unit, where she had also contributed substantially to the Unit's work on innovation and futures studies – most visibly in the coedited study by Christopher Freeman and Marie Jahoda (eds) 1978, World Futures: the Great Debate (published by Martin Robertson in the UK). She continued her interest in psychology with the 1977 study Freud and the Dilemmas of Psychology (Hogarth Press), and was coeditor of Technology and the Future of Europe: Competition and the Global Environment in the 1990s with Christopher Freeman, Keith Pavitt, Margaret Sharp and William Walker (Thomson Learning, 1991). She was elected a Foreign Honorary Member of the American Academy of Arts and Sciences in 1992.

== Death ==
Jahoda died on 28 April 2001 in Sussex, England, aged 94.

== Family life ==
In 1927, she married Paul Felix Lazarsfeld with whom she had her only child Lotte Franziska Lazarsfeld (born 1930). who became a professor of management at M.I.T. In 1934, she divorced Lazarsfeld, who had been involved with Herta Herzog since 1932. After she returned to the UK in 1958, she married the Labour politician Austen Albu.

== Positive Mental Health ==
In her book Current Concepts of Positive Mental Health (Basic Books, 1958), Marie Jahoda summarized and integrated previous work by social, psychodynamic, and humanistic psychologists such as Gordon Allport, Erik Erikson, Erich Fromm, Heinz Hartmann, Abraham Maslow, and Carl Rogers. As a result, she identified six basic components of positive mental health:

- Attitudes of an individual toward his own self.
- The individual's style and degree of growth, development, or self-actualisation.
- Central synthesising psychological functions (a.k.a. integration).
- The individual's degree of independence from social influences (a.k.a. autonomy).
- An individual's perception of reality.
- Environmental mastery (this included six facets: the ability to love; adequacy in love, work, and play; adequacy in interpersonal relations; efficiency in meeting situational requirements; capacity for adaptation and adjustment; and efficiency in problem-solving).

== Major publications ==
In addition to those cited above – Current concepts of positive mental health; World Futures, Technology and the Future of Europe; Freud and the Dilemmas of Psychology – her major publications include:

- (with Paul Lazarsfeld and Hans Zeisel), Die Arbeitslosen von Marienthal. 1932.
  - English ed. 1971 – Marienthal: the sociography of an unemployed community – paperback by Routledge, London, 1971 and republished in 2002.
- Research Methods in Social Relations – With Especial Reference to Prejudice. 1952.
- (with Richard Christie) Studies in the Scope and Method of The Authoritarian Personality: Continuities in Social Research (1954)
- (with Claire Selltiz, Morton Deutsch and Stuart W. Cook) Research Methods in Social Relations. 1964.
- (with H. S. D. Cole, Christopher Freeman, and Keith Pavitt) Thinking About The Future – A Critique Of The Limits To Growth (published in the US as Models of Doom). Sussex University Press, 1973.
- Work, employment and unemployment: An overview of ideas and research results in the social science literature. SPRU occasional paper series, University of Sussex, 1980.
- Employment and Unemployment :A Social-Psychological Analysis - The Psychology of Social Issues. 1982
- Ich habe die Welt nicht verändert [I didn't change the world]. Julius Beltz GmbH, 2002.
