= Hans Zeisel =

Austrian-born American lawyer

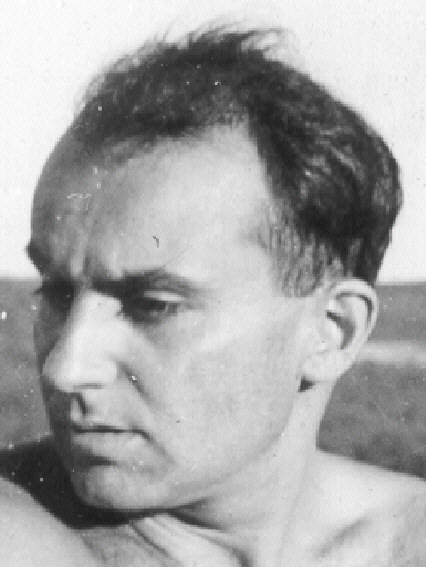
Hans Zeisel

Hans Zeisel (September 1, 1905 – March 7, 1992) was an Austrian-American sociologist and legal scholar who taught at the University of Chicago Law School from 1953 to 1974. He was best known for using quantitative social science techniques to study the law.

== Early life and education ==
Zeisel was born in Kadaň, Bohemia in 1905, and soon afterward moved with his family to Vienna, Austria, where he grew up. He received his doctorates in law and political science from the University of Vienna in 1927.

== Early career ==
After receiving his doctorates, Zeisel worked with Paul Lazarsfeld and Marie Jahoda on the 1933 study Die Arbeitslosen von Marienthal, which David Kaye has called "a celebrated study of the impact of the Depression and unemployment on a small Austrian town." Similarly, University of Chicago professor Friedrich Katz said of Marienthal that "The book had a profound effect, not only in Austria, but everywhere". Also after graduating from the University of Vienna, he practiced law and engaged in pro-socialism activism until 1938, when he emigrated to New York City in response to the Anschluss Österreichs. In New York, he became influential in the fields of media market research, and his research in these areas led to the 1947 statistics book Say It with Figures.

== Later career ==
Zeisel joined the faculty of the University of Chicago Law School in 1953 to study the American jury system with Harry Kalven. The research Zeisel and Kalven conducted on the jury system produced two books: Delay in the Court (1959) and The American Jury, which introduced the liberation hypothesis.

After retiring from the University of Chicago, he continued conducting research, especially on capital punishment (of which he was a firm opponent) and trademark infringement. In 1977 he was elected as a Fellow of the American Statistical Association. One of the last works he wrote discussed the limits of using statistical methods to study the legal system. This book was posthumously published in 1997 as Prove It with Figures.

== Death ==
Zeisel died at his home in 1992.
