= Harry Kalven =

American legal scholar (1914–1974)

Harry Kalven Jr.
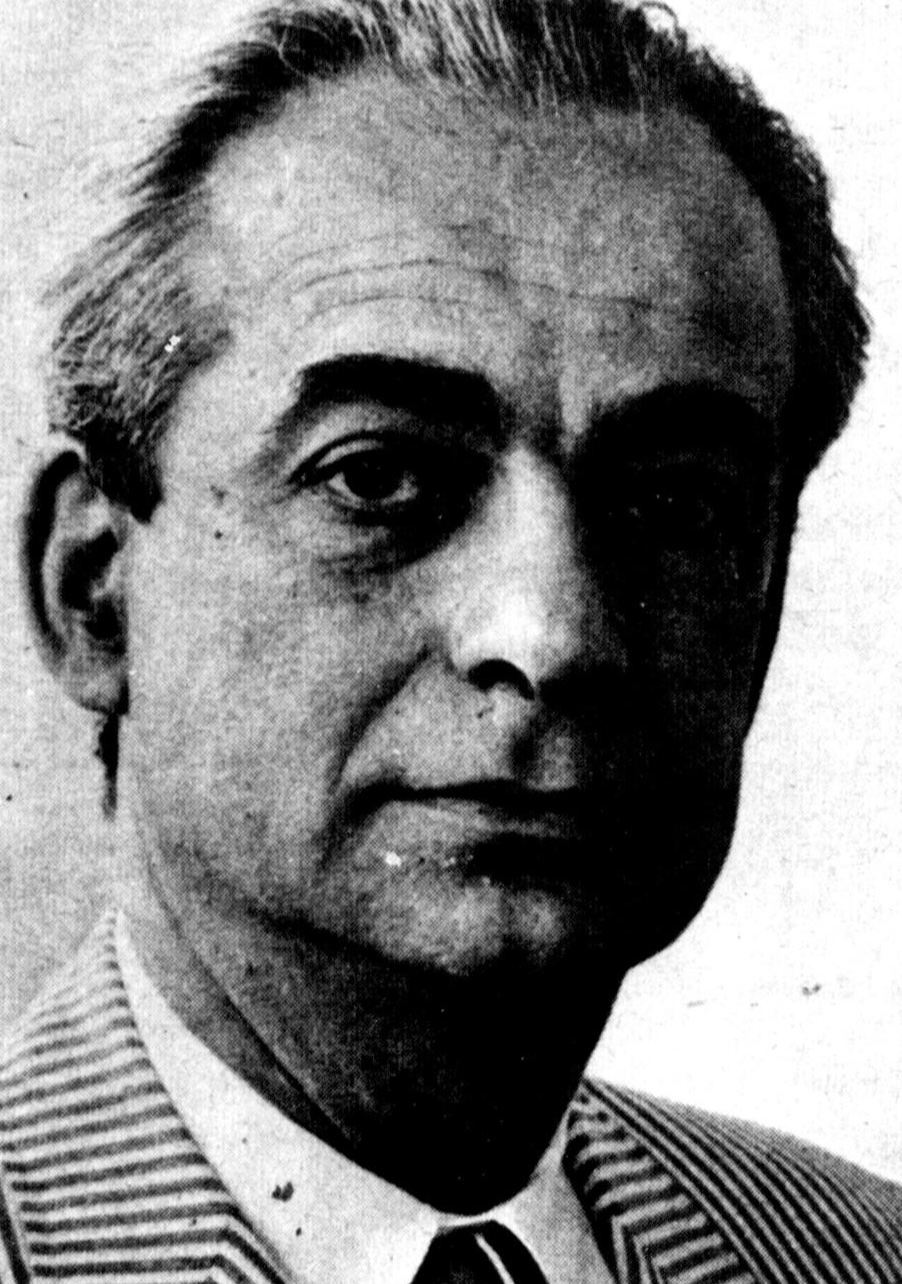
- Kalven in 1970
- Born: September 11, 1914; Chicago, Illinois, U.S.
- Died: October 29, 1974 (aged 60); Chicago, Illinois, U.S.
- Education: University of Chicago
- Children: Jamie Kalven
- Scientific career
- Fields: Legal studies
- Workplaces: University of Chicago Law School

Harry Kalven Jr. (September 11, 1914 – October 29, 1974) was an American legal scholar known for his scholarship on tort law and United States constitutional law. He was the Harry A. Bigelow Professor of Law at the University of Chicago Law School, having graduated from the College and the Law School. Kalven coauthored, with Charles O. Gregory (and later Richard Epstein), a widely used textbook in the field of torts, Cases and Materials on Torts. Kalven was also a scholar in the field of constitutional law, particularly in the area of the First Amendment. Kalven is the coauthor of "The Contemporary Function of the Class Suit," one of the most heavily cited articles in the history of American law, and widely considered to be the foundation of the modern class action lawsuit. He also co-authored a pioneering empirical study of The American Jury with his Chicago colleague Hans Zeisel, which introduced the liberation hypothesis.

Kalven coined the term "heckler's veto".

Kalven was chair of the committee that produced what became known as the "Kalven Report", a document outlining the University of Chicago's role "in political and social action."

After Kalven's death, his son Jamie Kalven, a journalist and human rights activist, completed Kalven's unfinished manuscript which was published by Harper & Row in 1988 as A Worthy Tradition: Freedom of Speech in America. In recognition of his impact on interdisciplinary legal research, the Law and Society Association awards the Harry J. Kalven, Jr. Prize each year to a scholar selected for “empirical scholarship that has contributed most effectively to the advancement of research in law and society.”

== Selected works ==
- Harry Kalven Jr., A Worthy Tradition: Freedom of Speech in America. Harper and Row Publishers. New York, 1988.
- Harry Kalven Jr., The Negro and the First Amendment. The Ohio State University Press, 1965.
- Harry Kalven Jr, Report on the University's Role in Political and Social Action. University of Chicago Record Vol. 1, No. 1, November 11, 1967
- Harry Kalven Jr. and Walter Blum, The Uneasy Case for Progressive Taxation. University of Chicago Press, 1953
- Harry Kalven Jr. and Hans Zeisel, The American Jury. Little Brown, 1965
