= Liberation hypothesis =

Effect on sentencing of extra-legal factors

In criminal justice, the liberation hypothesis proposes that extra-legal factors (such as race of offender and pretrial publicity) affect sentencing outcomes more in regards to less serious offenses compared to more serious ones, ostensibly because juries and judges will feel less able to follow their personal sentiments with regard to more serious crimes. The hypothesis also proposes that the extent to which extra-legal factors sentencing outcomes is dependent on the strength of the evidence in the case. The hypothesis was first proposed by Harry Kalven and Hans Zeisel in their 1966 book "The American Jury". Since then, multiple studies have found support for it.
