= Bernard Bailyn =

American historian (1922–2020)

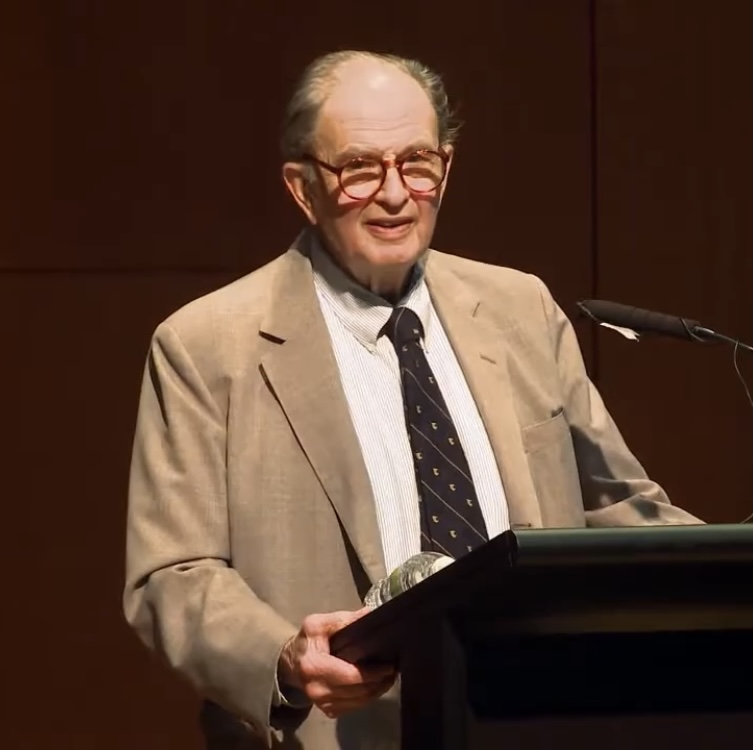
- Bailyn in 2012
- Born: September 9, 1922; Hartford, Connecticut, U.S.
- Died: August 7, 2020 (aged 97); Belmont, Massachusetts, U.S.
- Education: Williams College (BA); Harvard University (PhD)
- Spouse: Lotte Bailyn
- Awards: Pulitzer Prize for History (1968, 1987); Golden Plate Award (1988); Bancroft Prize (1968)
- Scientific career
- Fields: American history
- Workplaces: Harvard University
- Doctoral students: Gordon S. Wood; Pauline Maier

Bernard Bailyn (September 10, 1922 – August 7, 2020) was an American historian, author, and academic specializing in U.S. American colonial and revolutionary-era history. He was a professor at Harvard University from 1953. Bailyn won the Pulitzer Prize for History twice (in 1968 and 1987). In 1998 the National Endowment for the Humanities selected him for the Jefferson Lecture. He was a recipient of the 2010 National Humanities Medal. Bailyn devoted much effort looking at merchants, demographic trends, Loyalists, international links across the Atlantic, and especially the political ideas that motivated the Patriots. He was best known for studies of republicanism and Atlantic history that transformed the scholarship in those fields. He was elected a Fellow of the American Academy of Arts and Sciences in 1963 and a member of the American Philosophical Society in 1971.

== Early life and education ==
Bailyn was born in Hartford, Connecticut, in 1922, the son of Esther (Schloss) and Charles Manuel Bailyn. His family was Jewish. Bailyn earned his bachelor's degree from Williams College in 1945 and earned his Ph.D. from Harvard University in 1953. He was associated with Harvard for the rest of his life. As a graduate student at Harvard, he studied under Perry Miller, Samuel Eliot Morison, and Oscar Handlin. He was made a full professor in 1961, and professor emeritus in 1993.

== History books ==
Bernard Bailyn was the author of The Ideological Origins of the American Revolution (1967), which was awarded the Pulitzer Prize for History in 1968. He was the editor of The Apologia of Robert Keayne (1965) and of the two-volume Debate on the Constitution (1993).

He co-authored The Great Republic (1977), an American history textbook, and was co-editor of The Intellectual Migration, Europe and America, 1930–1960 (1969), Law in American History (1972), The Press and the American Revolution (1980), and Strangers Within the Realm: Cultural Margins of the First British Empire (1991).

== Major themes and ideas ==
Bailyn's dissertation and first publications dealt with New England merchants. He argued that international commerce was an uncertain business, given the high risk of losses at sea in the very long turnaround times, which meant that information was often too old to be useful. Merchants reduced the uncertainty by pooling their resources, especially with marriages to other merchant families, and placing their kinfolk as trusted agents in London and other foreign ports.

International commerce became a chief means of growing rich in colonial Massachusetts. However, there was an ongoing tension between the entrepreneurial spirit on the one hand and traditional Puritan culture on the other. The world of merchants became an engine of social change, undermining the isolationism, scholasticism, and religious zeal of the Puritan leadership. Bailyn pointed the younger generation of historians away from Puritan theology and toward broader social and economic forces. Bailyn expanded his research to the social structure of Virginia, showing how its leadership class was transformed in the 1660s. Like Edmund Morgan at Brown University and Yale, Bailyn emphasized the multiple roles of the family in the colonial social system.

=== Libertarian roots of the American Revolution ===
In The Ideological Origins of the American Revolution Bailyn analyzed pre-Revolutionary political pamphlets to show that colonists believed the British intended to establish a tyrannical state that would abridge the historical British rights. He thus argued that the Revolutionary rhetoric of liberty and freedom was not simply propagandistic but rather central to their understanding of the situation. This evidence was used to displace Charles A. Beard's theory, then the dominant understanding of the American Revolution, that the American Revolution was primarily a matter of class warfare and that the rhetoric of liberty was meaningless. Bailyn maintained that ideology was ingrained in the revolutionaries, an attitude he said exemplified the "transforming radicalism of the American Revolution."

Bailyn argued that republicanism was at the core of the values French radical thinkers had striven to affirm. He located the intellectual sources of the American Revolution within a broader British political framework, explaining how English country Whig ideas about civic virtue, corruption, ancient rights, and fear of autocracy were, in the colonies, transformed into the ideology of republicanism.

According to Bailyn,

The modernization of American Politics and government during and after the Revolution took the form of a sudden, radical realization of the program that had first been fully set forth by the opposition intelligentsia ... in the reign of George the First. Where the English opposition, forcing its way against a complacent social and political order, had only striven and dreamed, Americans driven by the same aspirations but living in a society in many ways modern, and now released politically, could suddenly act. Where the French opposition had vainly agitated for partial reforms ... American leaders moved swiftly and with little social disruption to implement systematically the outermost possibilities of the whole range of radically libertarian ideas. In the process they ... infused into American political culture ... the major themes of eighteenth-century radical libertarianism brought to realization here. The first is the belief that power is evil, a necessity perhaps but an evil necessity; that it is infinitely corrupting; and that it must be controlled, limited, restricted in every way compatible with a minimum of civil order. Written constitutions; the separation of powers; bill of rights; limitations on executives, on legislatures, and courts; restrictions on the right to coerce and wage war—all express the profound distrust of power that lies at the ideological heart of the American Revolution and that has remained with us as a permanent legacy ever after.

In Bailyn's assessment, contested libertarian meanings change through time as "the colonists" struggled to define, and to pursue, the property of independence. Recent historians hold that more than any other "colonist," Boston waterfront rebels channeled their "cosmopolitanism into a belief that 'the cause of America' was a libertarian 'cause for all mankind."

In a 1976 article for the libertarian Reason magazine, economist Murray Rothbard claimed that Bailyn's work was the "now dominant school of historiography on the American Revolution" which stressed radical libertarian ideology as a main cause of the American Revolution, particularly a (justified) conspiracist view of the British government.

=== Two Concepts of Liberty ===
In her memorial tribute, Harvard historian Joyce Chaplin noted Bernard Bailyn's resistance to "dichotomies" and his attention to "granular" records and culture. In that context, Bailyn did not publish on political philosopher Isaiah Berlin until a 2006 assessment of "perfectionist ideas" found in "Two Concepts of Liberty." He contended that Berlin's framework for "liberty" was "formally cast as a discourse on the permissible limits of coercion; 'force' and 'constraint" are repeatedly referred to, and Berlin denied that all historical conflicts are reducible to conflicts of ideas." Berlin's "comments on the dangers of perfectionism had begun with his discussion of positive liberty...While at times, he then wrote, it might be justifiable 'to coerce men in the name of some goal (let us say, justice or public health), which they would, if they were more enlightened, themselves pursue,' once one claims that one knows what others need better than they know it themselves, one is 'in a position to ignore the actual wishes of men or societies.' " Bailyn triangulated his own approach with Berlin's "embattled position in defense of a liberal alternative" and "perfectionist ideas." For the latter, Bailyn distinguished his approach to "liberty" from the "unity" precepts of Actual idealism in Totalitarianism. Thus he decried "the repressive power of the Soviet state, the annihilatory power of the Nazi regime, the mind-blinding power of Maoist gangs, [and] the suffocating power of Islamic fundamentalism." He declared that "no one knew better than Berlin or expressed more brilliantly the genealogy and structure of perfectionist ideas. But their threat to civilisation, in the most general terms, lay not in their intrinsic malevolence but in the brutality of those who implacably imposed them: the populist thugs, the fanatical monopolists of power."

== Social history ==
In the 1980s, Bailyn turned from political and intellectual history to social and demographic history. His histories of the peopling of colonial North America explored questions of immigration, cultural contact, and settlement that his mentor Handlin had pioneered decades earlier.

Bailyn was a major innovator in new research techniques, such as quantification, collective biography, and kinship analysis.

Bailyn is representative of those scholars who believe in the concept of American exceptionalism but avoid the terminology and thereby avoid getting entangled in rhetorical debates. According to Michael Kammen and Stanley N. Katz:

[Bailyn] is very clearly a believer in the distinctiveness of American civilization. Although he rarely, if ever, uses the phrase "American exceptionalism," he repeatedly insists upon the "distinctive characteristics of British North American life." He has argued...that the process of social and cultural transmission resulted in peculiarly American patterns of education (in the broadest sense of the word); and he believes in the unique character of the American Revolution.

== Atlantic history ==
As a leading advocate of Atlantic history, Bailyn organized an annual international seminar on the "History of the Atlantic World" from 1995 onward. Through the seminar, he promoted social and demographic studies, especially regarding flows of population into colonial America. Bailyn's Atlantic History: Concepts and Contours (2005) explores the borders and contents of the emerging field, which emphasizes cosmopolitan and multicultural elements that have tended to be neglected or considered in isolation by traditional historiography dealing with the Americas.

== Personal life ==
Bailyn was married to MIT Professor of Management Lotte Bailyn (née Lazarsfeld). His two sons are Charles Bailyn, who is an astrophysicist at Yale University, and John Bailyn, a linguist at Stony Brook University.

Bailyn died on August 7, 2020, at his home in Belmont, Massachusetts, after suffering from heart failure. He was 97.

== Students ==
Former students of Bailyn include Pulitzer Prize winners Michael Kammen, Jack N. Rakove, and Gordon S. Wood, as well as Pulitzer Prize finalist Mary Beth Norton. Other notable Bailyn students include:

- Robert Allison
- Fred Anderson (Crucible of War and A People's Army)
- Virginia DeJohn Anderson (Creatures of Empire)
- Mary Sarah Bilder
- Richard L. Bushman (From Puritan to Yankee)
- Philip J. Greven (The Protestant Temperament, Spare the Child)
- Richard D. Brown (Revolutionary Politics in Massachusetts: The Boston Committee of Correspondence and the Towns, 1772–1774 and Knowledge Is Power: The Diffusion of Information in Early America, 1700–1865)
- Sally E. Hadden (Slave Patrols)
- David Hancock (historian) ("Oceans of Wine: Madeira and the Emergence of American Trade and Taste," "Citizens of the World: London Merchants and the Integration of the British Atlantic Community, 1735–1785)
- James Henretta (Families and farms: Mentalité in Pre-Industrial America)
- Peter Charles Hoffer (Law and People in Colonial America, among others)
- Daniel Hulsebosch, Russell D. Niles Professor of Law at New York University School of Law
- Stanley N. Katz (Newcastle's New York)
- James Kettner (The Development of American Citizenship, 1608–1870)
- David Konig, Washington University in St. Louis professor of law and history
- Pauline Maier (American Scripture on the Declaration and Ratification: The People Debate the Constitution, 1787–1788, winner of the 2011 George Washington Book Prize and the Fraunces Tavern Book Prize)
- William E. Nelson, legal and constitutional historian and Edward Weinfeld Professor of Law at New York University School of Law, author of The Fourteenth Amendment: From Political Principle to Judicial Doctrine (1988), winner of the Littleton-Griswold Prize of the American Historical Association, and many other books
- Daniel Oliver (policymaker), former executive editor of National Review and former chairman of the Federal Trade Commission
- Jeffrey Pasley (The First Presidential Contest, The Tyranny of Printers, Beyond the Founders
- Mark A. Peterson (The City State of Boston)
- Theodore R. Sizer, Dean of the Harvard Graduate School of Education, Professor of Education at Brown University, and major figure in late-twentieth century American educational reform
- George David Smith (practitioner of applied economic and business history and founding partner of The Winthrop Group, Inc. Anatomy of a Business Strategy" [Co-winner: Best book on Business and Industry, American Publishers' Assn.]; "From Monopoly to Competition;" "The New Financial Capitalists, with George Baker; History of The Firm [McKinsey & Co.], lead author
- Peter H. Wood (Black Majority)
- Michael Zuckerman (Peaceable Kingdoms)

Many of these historians have gone on to train a new generation of American historians; others have branched out into fields as diverse as law and the history of science.

== See also ==
- Historiography of the United States

== Bibliography ==
- Bailyn, Bernard (1955). The New England Merchants in the Seventeenth Century. Harvard University Press. ISBN 978-0-674-61280-8.
- Massachusetts Shipping, 1697–1714: A Statistical Study (with Lotte Bailyn). Harvard University Press, 1959.
- Education in the Forming of American Society: Needs and Opportunities for Study. University of North Carolina Press, 1960.
- Pamphlets of the American Revolution, 1750-1776, Volume I: 1750-1765, Edited by Bernard Bailyn, Jane N. Garrett, Harvard University Press
- Bailyn, Bernard (1967). The Ideological Origins of the American Revolution. Cambridge, Belknap Press of Harvard University Press. ISBN 9780674443013. Awarded the Pulitzer Prize and the Bancroft Prize in 1968.
- The Origins of American Politics. Knopf, 1968 ISBN 9780394708652
- The Ordeal of Thomas Hutchinson. Harvard University Press, 1974 ISBN 9780674641617
  - winner of the 1975 National Book Award in History.
- (coauthor) The Great Republic: A History of the American People (Little, Brown, 1977) ISBN 9780669209860
- The Peopling of British North America: An Introduction. Knopf, 1986 ISBN 9780394757797
- Voyagers to the West: A Passage in the Peopling of America on the Eve of the Revolution. Knopf, 1986; won the Pulitzer Prize in History, the Saloutos Award of the Immigration History Society, and distinguished book awards from the Society of Colonial Wars and the Society of the Cincinnati.
- Faces of Revolution: Personalities and Themes in the Struggle for American Independence. Knopf, 1990 ISBN 9780679736233
- (editor) The Debate on the Constitution: Federalist and Antifederalist Speeches, Articles, and Letters During the Struggle for Ratification. Part One: September 1787 to February 1788. Library of America, 1993. ISBN 978-0-940450-42-4
- (editor) The Debate on the Constitution: Federalist and Antifederalist Speeches, Articles, and Letters During the Struggle for Ratification. Part Two: January to August 1788. Library of America, 1993. ISBN 978-0-940450-64-6
- On the Teaching and Writing of History (Dartmouth, 1994) ISBN 9780874517200
- — (March 1996). "Context in History". History. Quadrant. 40 (3): 9–15.
- To Begin the World Anew: The Genius and Ambiguities of the American Founders. Knopf, 2003 ISBN 9780375713088
- Atlantic History: Concept and Contours. Harvard University Press, 2005 ISBN 9780674016880
- The Barbarous Years: The Peopling of British North America: The Conflict of Civilizations, 1600–1675, Alfred A. Knopf, 2012, ISBN 978-0-394-51570-0.
- Sometimes an Art: Nine Essays on History, Alfred A. Knopf, 2015, ISBN 978-1-101-87447-9.
- Illuminating History: A Retrospective of Seven Decades, Norton, 2020 ISBN 9781324005834
