= Ada X =

Canadian feminist artist-run centre

Ada X, formerly known as Studio XX, is a feminist artist-run centre based in Montreal, Canada. Founded in 1996, it focuses on the promotion and production of new media art by offering workshops, artist residencies and by hosting exhibitions. It operates in French and English. The studio is currently located at 4001 rue Berri in the Plateau-Mont-Royal neighbourhood of Montreal.

== History ==
Studio XX was founded by Sheryl Hamilton, Patricia Kearns, Kathy Kennedy, and Kim Sawchuk in 1996. They started with an equipment sharing program and a computer lab that they themselves put together from older computer models. Their intention was to create a feminist space that encouraged the creation and dissemination of new media art. Additionally, Studio XX acted and still acts today as a source of education and conversation on the topic of digital technologies with the goal of "demystifying and deconstructing digital technologies through critical examination." This was and still is a part of a philosophy known Cyberfeminism. The studio has an emphasis on developing a digital democracy. Digital democracy ensures accessibility to and training on digital technologies for those who may face hurdles in obtaining this knowledge otherwise. This entails educating, equipping, exhibiting, and celebrating the works of people who are marginalized within the community.

=== Name Change ===
Until 2020, Ada X operated under the name Studio XX. The XX in the title was in reference to the female chromosome. However, after some deliberation, members decided that the name did not accurately represent the beliefs of the community as it was not inclusive of trans, non-binary and queer artists. The name Ada X, standing for Art, Digital, Activism was chosen. The singular X represents the studio's history as well as being a symbol for "an intersection of gender that is rich, manifold and fluid" In conjunction with this name change of the studio, the affiliated radio program XX Files changed its name to Ffiles.

== Services ==
Members of the studio have access to a variety of services including access to the computer lab, equipment and space rentals. Since 2017, Ada X has introduced a unique theme that guides its programming over a certain time period. Past and current themes include, DISLOCATIONS (2017-2018), Invisible Labor (2018-2019) and Slow Tech (2019-2022).

=== Residency Program ===
Ada X offers artist residencies. This is a six-week period of time, in which the artist chosen has access to a private workstation, workshops and studio equipment in order to realize a project. They are remunerated with an artist fee.

=== Workshops & Exhibitions ===
Ada X offers a series of professional training workshops. Some past workshops have included topics such as website production, electronic audio, fabrication of solar batteries etc. Additionally, Ada X offers a range of educational activities aimed at younger audiences. Ada X also organizes and curates a variety of exhibits as part of its programming.

== Notable Projects ==
=== HTMlles Festival ===
HTMlles is an international media arts and digital arts festival established by Ada X in 1997. The festival takes place across multiple venues, and it occurs biennially. The festival's mandate states that "each edition explores urgent socio-political questions through a series of exhibitions, round tables, conferences, performances and workshops." HTMlles Festival regularly partners with various Montreal based organizations including Eastern Bloc, Feminist Media Studio, Groupe Intervention Video, La Centrale Galerie Powerhouse, Moving Image Research Laborator y, Laboratoire NT2, OBORO, Studio 303, Technoculture, Art and Games (TAG), and Articule.

Past Editions
Year	Themes	Reference
2020	Slow Tech	
2018	Beyond the # — Failures and Becomings	
2016	Terms of Privacy	
2014	ZÉR0 FUTUR{E}	
2012	Risky Business	
2010	Home Land	
2007	Crowd Control	
2005	Peripheries + Proximities	
2003	Active Agent	
2002	The Double, the Multiple and Contamination in Web Art	
2001	Mutating Cultures and Identity	
2000	n.a	
1998	n.a	
1997	n.a	

=== Ffiles Radio ===
Ffiles Radio, formerly known as XX files, is an intersectional feminist radio project started in 1996 by Ada X founder, Kathy Kennedy and longtime contributor and current production coordinator Deborah VanSlet. Similar to Ada X, the show's contents focus on conversation related to digital technologies. Some themes include "transmission practices, sound healing, electronic music discourse, noise, techno-feminisms, the voice, and much more." Ffiles is broadcast on CKUT 90.3 FM every Wednesday from 11:30 AM – 12:00 PM EST. Additionally, Ffiles also has a monthly broadcast on N10.AS Radio. According to CKUT 90.3 FM past hosts include, Valérie D. Walker, Anita Cotic, Bérengère Marin-Dubuard, Britt Wray, Maia Iotzova, Maya Richman, Stéphanie Dufresne, Amanda-É. Clément, and Nnedimma Nnebe. Current hosts include Julia Dyck, Amanda Harvey, Miranda Jones, Sophy Merizzi, and Sophie Marisol.

=== Matricules ===
Matricules is an archival project launched by Ada X in 2008. It is one of the largest archives of digital art started by women. The archive has over 3,000 pieces.

=== .DPI Magazine ===
.dpi was an online publication produced with Ada X that ran from 2004-2015. The magazine implemented a feminist perspective on the themes of art and digital technologies. The magazine was released bi-annually with its contents revolving around a specific theme such as Hacktivism. In 2012, the magazine re-launched with a more focused mandate and structure. Then Editor-in-Chief Sophie Le-Phat Ho stated, " We want to welcome reflections and showcase feminist aspects of different digital art events and initiatives. We want to build a discourse of feminism in regard to digital culture, especially here in Montreal.”
