= Stanley Nider Katz =

American historian (born 1934)

Stanley Nider Katz (born April 23, 1934 in Chicago, Illinois) is an American historian specializing in American legal and constitutional history and the history of philanthropy. He is director of the Princeton University Center for Arts and Cultural Policy Studies and director emeritus of the American Council of Learned Societies.

He graduated from Harvard University with an AB (1955), MA (1959), and PhD in American colonial history (1961). He taught at Harvard from 1961 to 1965, serving as Allston Burr Senior Tutor of Leverett House from 1963 to 1965. He went on to teach at the University of Wisconsin–Madison (1965–70), the University of Chicago Law School (1970–78), Princeton University (1978–1986), and the Woodrow Wilson School of Public and International Affairs. In addition to serving as president of the Organization of American Historians (1987-1988), Katz served as president of the American Council of Learned Societies from 1986 to 1997, for which he was awarded a 2010 United States National Humanities Medal. Katz was elected to the American Academy of Arts and Sciences in 1991 and the American Philosophical Society in 1996.

Katz served as a board member of the New Jersey Council for the Humanities for 37 years, including many as Chair. In recognition of his service to the organization and the humanities, NJCH announced the creation of the Stanley N. Katz Prize for Excellence in Public Humanities. Beginning in 2022, the award will be given annually to recognize an organization that has demonstrated significant engagement with and impact through community-focused public humanities work in New Jersey.
