= Kim Komenich =

American photojournalist and professor

- Born: Kim Komenich; October 15, 1956 (age 69); Laramie, Wyoming (USA)
- Education: San José State University, University of Missouri
- Occupations: Photojournalist, filmmaker, professor

Kim Komenich (/ˈkɒmənɪtʃ/ KOM-ə-nitch; born October 15, 1956) is an American Pulitzer Prize-winning photojournalist, filmmaker and university professor.

== Life and work ==
Komenich started his career as a photographer at Forbis Studio in Modesto, California, in 1973, before moving to the Manteca Bulletin, where he worked as a photographer and reporter for one year.

Komenich later attended San José State University, graduating in 1979 with a bachelor's degree in journalism. Later that same year, Komenich was hired as a staff photographer at the Contra Costa Times, where he worked for three years before he was hired by the San Francisco Examiner in 1982. Komenich also freelanced for magazines such as Time, Stern, Life, U.S. News & World Report and Newsweek.

Komenich has won numerous prizes for his photography including two United Press International (UPI) first-place awards in 1982 and 1985, the National Headliner award in 1982, a World Press Photo award in 1983, and a first-place Associated Press award in 1985. Two years later, Komenich was awarded the 1987 Pulitzer Prize in spot news photography for his coverage of the People Power Revolution while on assignment for the Examiner.

Komenich continued working as a staff photographer for the Examiner until 2000. During this time he took a leave of absence from the paper to serve as a visiting instructor at the University of Missouri, where he taught the photojournalism capstone "Picture Story and the Photographic Essay" course. While at Missouri he received the Donald K. Reynolds Graduate Teaching Award.

In 2007, Komenich graduated from the University of Missouri with a master's degree in journalism. From 2000–2009, Komenich served as a staff photographer and editor at the San Francisco Chronicle before accepting a full-time teaching position at his alma mater, San José State University. In 2015, Komenich accepted an assistant professor position at San Francisco State University.

Komenich is a 2005 recipient of the Clifton C. Edom Education Award from the National Press Photographers Association (NPPA). Komenich also served as a 1993-94 John S. Knight Fellow at Stanford University and served as a fall 2001 teaching fellow at the Center for Documentary Studies at U.C. Berkeley. He was also a 2006-07 Dart Ochberg Fellow at the Dart Center for Journalism and Trauma, based at Columbia University.

In 2016, Komenich released a 70-minute documentary film and companion book titled Revolution Revisited, in which he looks back at the final days of the Ferdinand Marcos regime in the Philippines.
