= Lotte Bailyn =

American social psychologist (b. 1930)

- Education: Swarthmore College; MIT
- Spouse: Bernard Bailyn
- Scientific career
- Fields: social psychology
- Workplaces: MIT

Lotte Franziska Bailyn (née Lazarsfeld; born July 17, 1930) is an American social psychologist. She is the T Wilson Professor of Management, Emerita at the MIT Sloan School of Management. She was the first woman faculty member at MIT Sloan.

== Early life and education ==
Lotte Lazarsfeld was born in Vienna, Austria in 1930. She is the daughter of Marie Jahoda and Paul Felix Lazarsfeld. Her family fled Austria to New York City in 1937 after the Nazi occupation.

In 1951, she earned her BA in mathematics from Swarthmore College and her PhD in social psychology from the Radcliffe Graduate School in 1956.

== Career ==
Like many female academics of her generation, Bailyn had no serious career opportunities and got by in research with temporary contracts. In 1956 and 1957, she worked as a research associate at Harvard University, in 1957 and 1958 as an instructor in the Department of Economics and Social Science of the Massachusetts Institute of Technology and then again for the next few years without a permanent job as an assistant and lecturer at Harvard. In 1969, she returned to MIT and got a position as associate professor there in 1972 when she was 41 years old. She received a professorship at the MIT Sloan School of Management in 1980.

From 1997 to 1999, she was Chair of the MIT faculty, succeeding Lawrence Bacow.

Bailyn carried out research on structural change in the world of work in industrial projects and, in her study published in 1993, came to the conclusion that the isolation between the world of work and family that arose in industrial society was a hindrance to work productivity and job satisfaction. Her research results received little attention at the time. Under the term “dual agenda”, it proposes measures with which this split can be broken. Years later, the questions and research results were taken up under the heading of compatibility of work and family.

== Personal life ==
She married Bernard Bailyn on June 18, 1952. Together they had two children, Charles Bailyn, astrophysicist at Yale University, and John Bailyn, a linguist at Stony Brook University.

== Awards and honors ==
In 2000, she received an honorary Doctor of Philosophy from the University of Piraeus in Piraeus, Greece.

In 2021, Bailyn was awarded the 2021 Centennial Medal of the Harvard Graduate School of Arts and Sciences.

She is a Fellow of the Association for Psychological Science and the American Psychological Association.

In October 2022 she received the 1st Marie Jahoda Prize for outstanding scientific findings from the social democratic educational organizations in Austria (SPÖ Education).

== Publications ==
- Mass media and children: a study of exposure habits and cognitive effects. Washington : American Psychological Assn., 1959. Dissertation Radcliffe College, 1956
- with Bernard Bailyn: Massachusetts Shipping, 1697–1714: A Statistical Study (Harvard University Press, 1959)
- with Edgar H. Schein: Living with Technology: Issues at Mid-Career (MIT Press, 1980)
- Breaking the Mold: Women, Men, and Time in the New Corporate World. (Free Press, 1993)
  - Breaking the Mold: Redesigning Work for Productive and Satisfying Lives (Cornell, 2006)
- with Charles M. Vest, Robert J. Birgeneau: A study on the status of women faculty in science at MIT (Massachusetts Institute of Technology, 1999)
- with Joyce K. Fletcher; Bettye H. Pruitt; Rhona Rapoport: Beyond Work - Family Balance: Advancing Gender Equity and Workplace Performance (Jossey-Bass, 2001) ISBN 0-7879-5730-5
- Mitherausgeberin von National Academy of Sciences: Beyond Bias and Barriers: Fulfilling the Potential of Women in Academic Science and Engineering (National Academies Press, 2006) ISBN 0-309-10042-9
