= Secondary victimisation =

Further victim-blaming by authorities

Secondary victimisation (or post crime victimisation or double victimisation) refers to further victim-blaming from criminal justice authorities following a report of an original victimisation.

== Prevalence ==
Rates of victimisation in the United States are high, with an estimated 5.7 million individuals experiencing at least one victimisation in 2016. Considering these are cases of criminal offences, the reported rates of violent victimisation are disproportionately low. Less than half (42%) report any violent crime of threatened or real force, such as physical assault, battery, or weapons offenses. Additionally, under a quarter (23%) report rape, childhood, or sexual assault to the police. Further, out of the portion that does report sexual assault or rape, about half describe the experience of reporting as upsetting, frustrating, and useless. Despite efforts to increase criminal reports of victimisation, authorities and law enforcement personnel often discount individuals’ violent experiences and fail to attend to both the necessary legal actions and interpersonal actions.

== Vulnerability ==
When institutions or criminal justice system personnel fail to support the victimized individual, victims are vulnerable to secondary victimisation. While the appropriate and legal way to respond to primary victimisation is to report the event, authorities often deny, do not believe, or blame the victim (Campbell & Raja, 1999; Campbell & Raja, 2005). In turn, up to 90% of victims report experiencing negative social reaction and attribute the incident as a “second rape” or “second assault”.

Research suggests that victim of sexual violence or assault are the least likely to receive support or resources following reporting. This may be due to perceived lack of evidence, social stigma, and overall discomfort when dealing with sexual incidences.

In a study of rape victims undergoing prosecution for their assault, those who felt their detectives responded empathetically and with understanding were likelier to pursue prosecution, felt their experiences were important, and their cases deserved to be heard. Empathetic and supportive responses from authorities could potentially improve mental and physical health in rape survivors and additionally, improve reporting rates and lessen judgmental attitudes from the criminal justice system. Because sexual violence is a sensitive subject for all parties, criminal justice personnel may avoid, ignore, or publicly misconstrue their opinions about the situation as an effort to separate themselves or cope with dangerous and uncomfortable situations. Studies suggest these misconceptions by the system may further damage individuals’ mental health and a safer world. This could be combatted with accepting, non-accusatory perspectives, aiding in accuracy the sexual violence reports. Several authors speculate authorities’ supportive approach benefits the victim and promotes a just world. In this way, previous victims might report and seek appropriate resources in the future.

Those exposed to traumatic victimisation are vulnerable to experiencing secondary victimisation. If social needs such as empathy, support, and understanding are not met, individuals are prone to this phenomenon. While anybody who has experienced victimisation is susceptible to secondary victimisation, prevalence rates are significantly elevated for some populations. This includes females, children, racial and sexual minorities, and those sexually assaulted by an acquaintance or stranger. Moreover, those experiencing a certain type of violence are at increased likelihood to experience secondary victimisation. These include physical assault, sexual assault, and domestic violence Notably, rape victims are at highest risk of secondary victimisation from the criminal justice system, with about half who report describing the process as distressing.

== Reporting victimisation ==
As a consequence of social rejections and insensitivities to acknowledging trauma or violence, individuals are increasingly apt to continue not reporting. This can be detrimental to victims’ mental health, as sexual violence often happens more than once and not reporting violence helps to maintain a repeated cycle of abuse. Experiencing violence is associated with negative mental and physical outcomes, including shame, emotion dysregulation, psychological stress, loss of resources, and mental health pathology. In a meta-analysis about sexual assault victimisation and psychopathology, there was a medium-sized effect overall effect size was moderate after accounting for several mental health diagnoses including depression, anxiety, suicidality, disordered eating, and substance abuse. This indicates that sexual assault victimisation is significantly related to mental health distress even after controlling for other associated symptoms. Additionally, women who experience secondary victimisation are likelier to have both adverse physical health and mental health implications and are also unlikely to seek services and treatment. Given these individuals are likely in a troubled state, pressures of reporting are cognitively taxing. To report crime, especially sexual crimes, implicates a further level of vulnerability. When victims are met with hostile reactions, they are reinforced to not report. This is not only harmful to the individual, but to society, in that perpetrators are thus permitted to continue committing crimes and abuse. As a consequence of victim-blaming and other negative attitudes towards victims, reported rates of criminal abuse are low and distress in victims is high.

== Interactions with the criminal justice system ==
Despite high rates of secondary victimisation, reporting rates are low. It is not unusual for criminal justice personnel to discourage victims from prosecuting their sexual assault cases due to victim-blaming behaviors and discounting victims’ traumatic experiences. One incident that attracts much controversy in the criminal justice system is reporting violent crimes on one's intimate partner. Women who report rape by an intimate partner are seen as less credible by the system and law enforcement are more likely to encourage dropping the case. Societal standards of obeying an intimate partner and thus encompassing rape culture are prevalent in the criminal justice system. Although it is a legal crime that is being reported, victims are often turned away feeling alienated, hopeless, and unworthy and have limited options for resources beyond the system.

== Fragmented memory ==
A possible explanation of why the criminal justice system is unlikely to believe many victims is due to victims’ fragmented memory. It is not uncommon for victims of sexual abuse to also have a traumatic brain injury or other neurobiological reactions due to assault. In her work, Campbell explains how molecular changes occur in response to trauma, and how this can influence discrepancies in victims’ reports and recollections of the event. After a traumatic incident, chemical alterations in the brain change, impacting encoding and processing the memory.

Not only do neurobiological changes affect victims’ memories, but emotion dysregulation, repression, suppression, dissociation, and avoidance of the event are also common reactions in victim. These cognitive and neurobiological factors are rarely considered when a victim reports an assault. During the time law enforcement personnel gather information about the event, they could be met with victims explaining their stories inconsistently due to a fragmented memory. Either by a neurobiological change or psychological response to particularly distressing trauma, victims may fall prey to the inability to coherently portray details of the event, thus taking away credibility and facilitating secondary victimisation.

== See also ==
- Rape myth
