= Virginia DeJohn Anderson =

American historian

Virginia DeJohn Anderson is an American historian. She is professor of history at the University of Colorado Boulder and the author of three books: New England's Generation: The Great Migration and the Formation of Society and Culture in the Seventeenth Century (Cambridge University Press, 1991), Creatures of Empire: How Domestic Animals Transformed Early America (Oxford University Press, 2004), and The Martyr and the Traitor: Nathan Hale, Moses Dunbar, and the American Revolution (Oxford University Press, 2017).

Anderson earned a BA summa cum laude from the University of Connecticut and then, on a Marshall Scholarship, an MA from the University of East Anglia in Norwich, England. She earned an AM and PhD from Harvard University.
