= Kim Sawchuk =

Canadian philosopher

Kim (Kimberly) Sawchuk
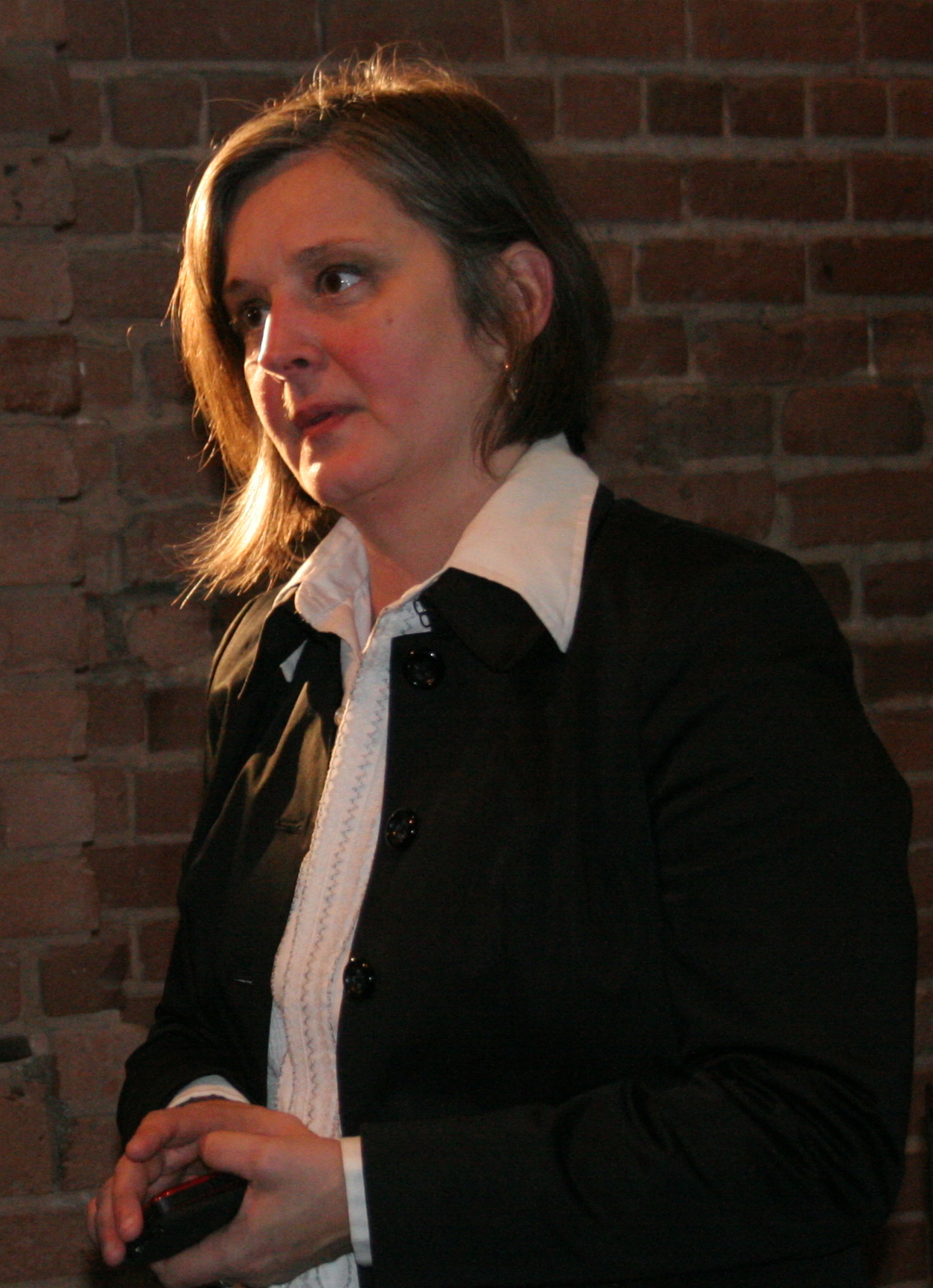
- Sawchuk in 2010
- Born: 1960
- Era: 20th- / 21st-century philosophy
- Region: Canada / North America
- School: Feminist Theory, Critical Theory, Cultural Studies, Disability Studies, Ageing Studies
- Main interests: Mobility theory, Ageing, Disability, Feminism, Cell phone cultures, Media arts, Research-creation, Qualitative methods
- Website: www.concordia.ca/faculty/kim-sawchuk.html/

Kim Sawchuk (born 1960) is a professor in the Department of Communication Studies, Research Chair in Mobile Media Studies, and Associate Dean of Research and Graduate Studies (Faculty of Arts and Science) at Concordia University in Montreal Canada. A feminist media studies scholar, Sawchuk's research spans the fields of art, gender, and culture, examining the intersection of technology into peoples lives and how that changes as one ages.

== Early life and career ==
Kimberly Anne Sawchuk was born in 1960 in Canada. She earned her bachelor's degree in 1982 from the University of Winnipeg, with gold medal honors for a dual-major in Political Science and History. She completed both a Master's in 1986 and her PhD in Social and Political Thought in 1991 from York University in Toronto. Sawchuk joined the Department of Communication Studies at Concordia University in 1990 and by 2011 was an associate professor. On 1 January 2015, she began serving as Associate Dean of Research and Graduate Studies for the Faculty of Arts and Science at Concordia.

She has been writing articles on the cultural impact of aging and technology since 1992, and examines cultural attitudes towards aging. Sawchuk has noted that if elderly people are portrayed in advertising at all, they are portrayed primarily as caricatures of their youth. Not who they are, but who they once were. However, she believes that as marketers and advertisers educate themselves about seniors, targeting older markets can be lucrative. She's also involved in changing the popular image of the elderly and works in collaboration with community organizations and activists to address their experience of digital technologies.

Sawchuk has participated in a wide number of research projects. In 2010, she was involved in a project on mobile communications and biomedical imaging. In 2011, Sawchuk and Barbara Crow conducted a research project sponsored by the Social Sciences and Humanities Research Council of Canada on whether services, which are frequently geared to on-line access, are accessible to marginalized or older citizens.

Often exploring feminist issues, Sawchuk's interests are not limited to feminism. In 2012, she developed a smartphone application with film producer Katarina Soukup, which allows users to uncover geographical and historical landmarks using the GPS systems on the phone, becoming virtual underground explorers. Sawchuk began participation in 2014 in a two-year trans-cultural project between Canada and the European Union called "Performigrations: people are the territory". The project is designed to study cultural change and diversity, modern mobility, and the spread of ideas.

In 2014, Sawchuk received a grant of approximately $3 million to research, over a seven-year period, the topic Ageing, Communication, Technologies (ACT): Experiencing a Digital World In Later Life. The project brings together collaborators from 12 international universities to study the use of technology by aging people and how that changes their world and views of the world.

In addition to research, Sawchuk has lectured internationally and participated in seminars at the University of Bologna, Drexel University, Istanbul Bilgi University, Lancaster University, the University of Manchester and University of Silesia, Poland.

Sawchuk co-founded the Mobile Media Lab (York-Concordia) in 2006. She is also the organizer of the Critical Disability Studies Working Group at Concordia and works in collaboration with artists and scholars to document and critically examine ableism in cities such as Montreal, Quebec. As part of her work on disabilities, Sawchuk is developing an archive with Arseli Dokumaci funded by the Canadian Consortium on Performance and Politics in the Americas (CCPPA) on performance and disability throughout the Americas.

In addition to her academic research, she co-founded of Ada X (formerly StudioXX), a digital media center in Montreal where feminist academics, artists, and community activists gather in 1996.

== Work as editor ==
She completed a six-year term as the editor of the Canadian Journal of Communications (www.cjc-online.ca) in 2011 and she is the co-editor of Wi: Journal of Mobile Media. She has also co-edited numerous books and special issues of journals.

=== Selected works ===
- Eds. Bill Burns, Cathy Busby and Kim Sawchuk. When Pain Strikes Minneapolis: University of Minnesota Press, 1999.
- Eds. Janine Marchessault and Kim Sawchuk. Wild Science: reading feminism medicine and the media United Kingdom: Routledge: 2000.
- Eds. Christina Lammer, Catherine Pilcher, Kim Sawchuk. Verkörperungen/Embodiment Vienna: Löcker Verlag, 2007.
- Eds. Gisele Amantea, Lorraine Oades and Kim Sawchuk. USED/goods Montreal: Conseil des Arts, 2009.
- Eds. Barbara Crow, Michael Longford, Kim Sawchuk. Sampling the Wireless Spectrum: the politics, poetics and practices of mobile media Toronto: University of Toronto Press, 2010.
- Sawchuk, K., & Crow, B. "Into the grey zone: Seniors, cell phones and milieus that matter" In B. Poppinga (ed.), Observing the mobile user experience: Proceedings of the 1st international workshop held in conjunction with NordiCHI (2010). (pp. 17–20).
- Sawchuk, K., & Crow, B. "I'm G-Mom on the Phone" Feminist Media Studies, 12(4), (2012) pp 496–505.
- Middleton, C., Shepherd, T., Shade, L.R., Sawchuk, K., & Crow, B. Intervention Regarding the Consultation on Proceeding to establish a mandatory code for mobile wireless services: Telecom Notice of Consultation" CRTC 2012-557, 11 October 2012 and CRTC 2012-557-1, 1 November 2012.

=== Special issues of journals ===
- Mobile Cultures, Special Issue of Wi: Journal of Mobile Media, with L. Grenier and G. Cucinelli, 2012. www.wi.mobilities.ca
- Conversations Across the Field, inaugural issue of ADA: Journal of Gender and Technology, with C. Stabile, eds. Vol 1.no. 1. 2012
- Media Arts Revisited, Special Issue of Canadian Journal of Communication, 37.1 with A. Zeffiro, 2012.
- Wireless Technologies, Mobile Practices, Special Issue of Canadian Journal of Communication 33.3, with B. Crow and R. Smith, 2008.
- Pedestrian Traffic, Special Issue of Wi: Journal of Mobile Media, Spring, with A. Zeffiro, B. Crow, and M. Longford, 2008.
- Mediated Spaces, Special Issue of Canadian Journal of Communication 33.2, 2008.
- Communicating Health, Special Issue of Canadian Journal of Communication 32.3/4, 2007.
- Vocabularies of Citizenship, Special Issue of Canadian Journal of Communication 32.2, 2007.

== See also ==
- Carrie Rentschler
