= Sophie Lazarsfeld =

Austrian-American therapist (1881–1976)

Sophie or Sofie Lazarsfeld (née Munk; May 26, 1881 – September 24, 1976) was an Austrian-American therapist and writer, a student of Alfred Adler.

== Life ==
Sophie Munk was born in Troppau on May 26, 1881.

She married Robert Lazarsfeld, a lawyer: the sociologist Paul Lazarsfeld was their son. Friedrich Adler lived with the family for some time: on the morning that Adler assassinated Austria's prime minister, he sent them a postcard saying he was in good spirits after leaving the house. In the later judgement of Paul Lazarsfeld, "My mother was responsible for destroying three men, my father, Friedrich Adler, and myself. I always say this."

Apparently introduced to the ideas of Alfred Adler (no relation to Friedrich) by her son, Lazarsfeld joined the Vienna Individual Psychology Society after the First World War, and underwent training with Alfred Adler in the 1920s. She coined the phrase "the courage to be imperfect", first using it at the 1925 Second International Congress of Individual Psychology, and expanding on the idea in later writing.

How Women Experience Men (1931) drew on the work of marriage clinics set up by Alfred Adler.

She escaped Austria for Paris in 1938, and then the United States in 1941, where she settled and built a psychological practice in New York City. She became Honorary President of the American Society of Adlerian Psychology, and contributed several articles to its journal, The American journal of individual psychology.

She died in 1976 in New York City.

== Work ==
- Vom häuslichen Frieden, 1926. With a foreword by Alfred Adler.
- Richtige Lebensführung, 1926
- Das lügenhafte Kind, 1927
- Die Ehe von heute und morgen (The marriage of today and tomorrow), 1927
- Erziehung zur Ehe (Training for marriage), 1928.
- (ed.) Technik der Erziehung; ein Leitfaden für Eltern und Lehrer, 1929
- Wie die frau den mann erlebt; fremde bekenntnisse und eigene betrachtungen (How women experience men), 1931. Translated by Karsten and E. Pelham Stapelfeldt as The Rhythm of Life: A Guide to Sexual Harmony for Women, London: G. Routledge and Sons, 1934. Also published in translation as Woman's experience of the male, London: Encyclopaedia Press, 1938, with an introduction by Norman Haire.
- Sexuelle Erziehung (Sexual education), 1931
- 'Did Oedipus Have an Oedipus Complex?', American Journal of Orthopsychiatry 14 (1944): 226-29; The Journal of Nervous and Mental Disease, 101, no. 1 (1945)
- 'War and Peace Between the Sexes', Individual Psychology Bulletin Vol. 6, Nos. 1-2 (1947), pp. 74–9
- 'The Use of Fiction in Psychotherapy: A Contribution to Bibliotherapy', American Journal of Psychotherapy, Vol. 3, No. 1 (January 1949), pp. 26–33
- 'Pitfalls in Psychotherapy', The American Journal of Individual Psychology, 10 (1952), pp. 20–26.
- 'The courage for imperfection', Journal of Individual Psychology, 22 (1966), pp. 163–65.
