= Voyagers to the West =

1986 book by Bernard Bailyn

Voyagers to the West: A Passage in the Peopling of America on the Eve of the Revolution
- Author: Bernard Bailyn
- Genre: history
- Publisher: Knopf
- Publication date: 1986
- Publication place: US
- Pages: 720
- Awards: Pulitzer Prize for History
- ISBN: 978-0394757780

Voyagers to the West: A Passage in the Peopling of America on the Eve of the Revolution is a 1986 nonfiction book by American historian Bernard Bailyn, published by Knopf. The book chronicles the migration of British farmers into colonial America in the 1770s. It won the 1987 Pulitzer Prize for History, which marked the second time Bailyn won the award; the first was in 1968 for The Ideological Origins of the American Revolution.
