= Narcotizing dysfunction =

Theory concerning overexposure to social or political issues causing apathy to them

Narcotizing dysfunction is a theory that as mass media inundates people on a particular issue, they become apathetic to it, substituting knowledge for action. It is suggested that the vast supply of communication Americans receive may elicit only a superficial concern with the problems of society. This would result in real societal action being neglected, while superficiality covers up mass apathy. Thus, it is termed "dysfunctional" as it indicates the inherent dysfunction of both mass media and social media during controversial incidents and events. The theory assumes that it is not in the best interests of people to form a social mass that is politically apathetic and inert. The term narcotizing dysfunction was identified in the article "Mass Communication, Popular Taste and Organized Social Action", by Paul F. Lazarsfeld, and Robert K. Merton.

Mass media's overwhelming flow of information has caused the populace to become passive in their social activism. Because the individual is assailed with information about a huge range of issues and problems, and they are knowledgeable about or able to discuss these issues, they believe they are helping to resolve these issues. As more time is spent educating oneself on current issues, there is a decrease in time available to take organized social action. Courses of action may be discussed, but they are rather internalized and rarely come to fruition. In short, people have unwittingly substituted knowledge for action. People's consciences are clear, as they think they have done something to address the issue. However, being informed and concerned is not a replacement for action. Even though there are increasing numbers of political messages, information, and advertisements available through traditional media and online media, political participation continues to decline. People pay close attention to the media, but there is an overexposure of messages that can be confusing and contradictory so people do not get involved in the political process.

== History ==
The term "narcotizing dysfunction" gained popularity from its use in the 1946 article "Mass Communication, Popular Taste, and Organized Social Action", by Paul F. Lazarsfeld and Robert K. Merton. Along with the status conferral function (i.e., mass media bestow prestige and enhance the authority of individuals and groups by legitimizing their status) and the reaffirmation of social norms function (i.e., mass media enforce social norms by exposing deviations from these norms to public view), they spotted a third social significance of mass media that had gone largely unnoticed: a narcotizing effect making the masses of the population politically inert. The expression condenses three principles:the first supposition is that informational excess could lead to a tragic numbness and social detachment. It has to do with the social risks associated with technology use, namely, the threat of desensitizing the individual’s awareness by means of a surplus of means of communication. The second assumption relies on the assertion that to know is the same as to act. The narcotizing dysfunction draws attention to the fact that individuals tend to consider that because they are informed about a subject, they are necessarily concerned with it—as if there was a correspondence between information and political commitment. The third assumption relates to the other two: to address a problem is not necessarily to engage with it. That is, being informed is not a replacement for action. By saturating people with information, mass media could be producing exactly what it wants to prevent: ignorance, indifference, and obliviousness.

== See also ==
- Collective identity
- Intellectualization
- Doomscrolling
- Media fatigue
- Slacktivism
