= Fideres =

London-based Economic consulting firm

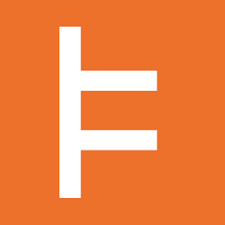
- Type: Private
- Industry: Economic Consulting
- Founded: 2009
- Headquarters: London, United Kingdom
- Products: Antitrust Litigation, Consumer Protection Litigation, Discrimination Litigation, Environmental Litigation, Financial Litigation, Securities Litigation
- Number of employees: 70
- Website: fideres.com

Fideres is an international economic consulting firm that specializes in antitrust litigation, consumer protection litigation, discrimination litigation, environmental litigation, financial litigation, and securities litigation. It provides economic analysis exclusively to plaintiffs' law firms and litigation funders, from case evaluation to expert testimony and settlement negotiations. The firm's mission is "Unbiased economic testimony for global litigation. Conflict-free by design: we act in litigation only, so no corporate mandate can shape our conclusions". Fideres was founded following the 2008 financial crisis with a focus exclusively on litigation, maintaining independence from conflicts of interest that affect firms serving both corporate and litigation clients.

== History ==
Fideres is a global economic advisory firm founded in 2009.

Fideres has assisted litigation cases and provided research on financial market manipulation, with work on LIBOR, FX, cryptocurrency market manipulation, and ISDAFIX.

It has also worked on antitrust litigation involving major technology companies including Amazon, Google, Microsoft and Apple.

As of August 2026, the firm operates across six countries, with offices in New York, London, Frankfurt, Madrid, Rome and Johannesburg.

== Practice Areas ==
Fideres operates six main practice areas:

Antitrust Litigation: Fideres specializes in antitrust litigation and other forms of market abuse that distort competition. The firm's expertise equips law firms with evidence, analysis, and strategic advantage needed to litigate these cases effectively. Clients gain access to Fideres's panel of affiliated testifying experts, among the most highly regarded in their fields.

Consumer Protection Litigation: Fideres provides economic and statistical analysis for consumer protection class actions in the United States, the United Kingdom and Europe, helping plaintiff law firms evaluate theories of harm, build the economic basis for class certification, and quantify damages from consumer fraud, false advertising, deceptive trade practices, subscription billing and data misuse.

Discrimination Litigation: Fideres applies statistical methods to analyse disparate impact in pricing, lending, employment and algorithmic systems, and develops methodologies to quantify economic damages in discrimination cases for class certification and settlement negotiations.

Environmental Litigation: Fideres analyses financial market data in cases involving environmental harm and greenwashing, assessing share price impacts for publicly listed companies and quantifying losses to investors and consumers for corporate misconduct.

Financial Litigation: Fideres is a provider of economics and industry testimony for complex disputes in financial markets, providing consulting and expert witness services in cases of market abuse, market manipulation and fraud.

Securities Litigation: The firm provides expert testimony in shareholder disputes including class certification, damages calculations, and market efficiency studies. Fideres has extensive experience in U.S. securities cases, having conducted over 150 event study reports and damages assessments for Section 10b, Section 11, and Section 14 class actions.

== Services ==
=== Expert Services ===
Fideres provides economic advisory services across the full lifecycle of a case: from early case evaluation and novel theories of harm, through damages modeling, class certification, expert testimony, and settlement:

- Expert economic analysis and testimony,
- Valuation and damages analysis,
- Expert reports and class action certification expert support,
- Evidence in court and cross examination,
- Market efficiency studies and loss causation assessments,
- Settlement negotiation support.

=== Research ===
Research provided by Fideres focuses on the technical aspects of financial market manipulation, anticompetitive conduct, and inefficient markets. Their research into the debt market, and government economic policies, such as CBILS, was also covered by the media. Their work analyzing trading patterns in foreign exchange markets was also featured on BBC Radio 4 in reference to the FOREX scandal. In 2016, Fideres's cofounder Alberto Thomas appeared on Sky News to discuss the ethics of Hedge Funds conducting and trading upon private exit polls for the UK.

==== Gold Price Manipulation ====
Fideres's research showed that between January 2010 and December 2013 the price of gold may have been manipulated on "50 per cent of occasions," observing "instances of sharp movements in the price of the metal" during the two daily conference calls between Barclays, Deutsche Bank, HSBC, Scotiabank and Societe Generale, a process called "London gold fixing". Thomas called it an "anachronistic way" of setting the price for gold. The findings were also reported on the Financial Times, but according to Gold Anti-Trust Action Committee the article, titled "Fears Over Gold Price Rigging Put Investors on Alert", was deleted from the FT website for being "too sensitive". The London gold fixing was subsequently the subject of In re Commodity Exchange, Inc., Gold Futures and Options Trading Litigation in the Southern District of New York, in which settlements totalling $152 million received final approval. Fideres acted as consulting expert to Quinn Emanuel, co-lead counsel for the class.

=== COVID-19 Travel Test Pricing ===
In July 2021 The Guardian reported research by Fideres into the pricing of COVID-19 travel tests in the United Kingdom. Analysing the fifty cheapest providers listed on the government's website, Fideres found an average gap of £60 between advertised prices and the price a consumer would actually pay, and that two thirds of the cheapest tests listed were unavailable or inaccessible. The Advertising Standards Authority was already investigating complaints about inconsistent pricing. Two days after publication the Secretary of State for Health and Social Care announced an audit of providers listed on the government website and wrote to the Competition and Markets Authority, which subsequently opened its own investigation.

==== Closet Indexers ====
In 2014, fund groups faced investigation for misleading investors into buying so-called "closet indexers", funds sold as actively managed but behave like index trackers. Based on an analysis of 1,147 US equity funds with more than $1bn in assets, Fideres had found that 15 per cent of funds in the sample were closet indexers, concluding that investors could have been entitled to "billions of dollars" in damages. Fideres subsequently provided expert analysis supporting closet indexing class actions in Canada, including McCorquodale v. RBC Global Asset Management and Gibbs v. HSBC Global Asset Management (Canada), both of which have been certified as class proceedings in British Columbia.

==== Wastewater and Sewage Research ====
In November 2022 Fideres published research on wastewater companies in England and Wales, which operate as regulated regional monopolies. It estimated that households may have incurred damages of approximately £163 million since 2016 as a result of underinvestment in sewage networks, and that the companies may have charged households more than £1.1 billion for sewage treatment services that were not provided because the sewage was discharged rather than treated. Fideres notified the Competition and Markets Authority of the research and asked it to investigate.

Fideres has continued to publish research on competition and market concentration, including investigations into Steinway's position in the professional grand piano market, Equifax's verification services, DoorDash's use of most-favoured-nation clauses, and Corning's position in the market for aluminosilicate glass used in consumer electronics.

== Academic Affiliations ==
Fideres maintains a network of over 40 affiliated academic experts from universities worldwide. The firm's academic affiliates provide expert testimony and economic analysis across multiple practice areas.

== Recent Cases ==
Amazon Buybox Antitrust Litigation

Hagens Berman EMEA and Charles Lyndon won the carriage dispute on this landmark consumer class action affecting more than 50 million consumers. Evidence from Fideres and its in-house expert Dr. Chris Pike proved decisive in winning the carriage dispute between rival class actions. The Expert report analysed Amazon's market power within the relevant market and the anticompetitive nature of its conduct in manipulating the algorithm that allocates the Buy Box. It set out a damages analysis that quantified the harmful impact of the anticompetitive conduct on a class of more than 50 million consumers. In the carriage ruling ([2024] CAT 8, 5 February 2024), the Competition Appeal Tribunal considered which of the rival experts' methodologies was "clearly or distinctly better", and preferred the methodology advanced by Mr Hammond's expert as better aligned to the appropriate counterfactual.

Microsoft Cloud Antitrust Litigation

Dr. Maria Luisa Stasi filed a landmark consumer class action claiming over £1 billion in damages from Microsoft's anticompetitive conduct in the cloud computing market through Scott+Scott. Fideres assisted by producing a class certification expert report addressing Microsoft's market power and proposing methodology to assess counterfactual prices. The case alleges Microsoft punished UK businesses using rival cloud services by charging higher licensing fees for Windows Server.

=== LIBOR Manipulation ===
After the LIBOR scandal broke in 2012, Thomas appeared as a witness at a Treasury Select Committee hearing on benchmark manipulation on 2 July 2014. The role of committee was to review the banking sector after banks were found to manipulate various financial benchmarks to their gain. Thomas talked about why and how the manipulation had occurred, the facts related to the manipulation, and suggested a three-point plan which could help prevent it going forward. Fideres provided consulting expert work, including a plan of allocation for plaintiffs, on the SIBOR and SOR benchmark manipulation litigation (Fund Liquidation Holdings LLC v. Citibank, N.A., United States District Court for the Southern District of New York), which was resolved by settlements totalling $155 million.

=== Google Play Store Antitrust Litigation ===
In August 2024 Professor Barry Rodger brought collective proceedings against Alphabet Inc. and associated Google companies before the Competition Appeal Tribunal, alleging that Google had abused its dominant position in Android app distribution by excluding rival app stores and charging excessive commission to UK app developers. Fideres was retained by Rodger and his solicitors Geradin Partners to support Professor Amelia Fletcher in preparing her expert reports for certification and for trial. The claim was certified in May 2025. In September 2026 the Competition Appeal Tribunal approved a settlement of £260 million, comprising £160 million for eligible developers and £100 million towards funding, legal and other costs. It was the largest settlement approved by the Competition Appeal Tribunal under the UK’s opt-out collective proceedings regime since its introduction in 2015.

=== ISDAfix Rigging ===
In 2014, more than a dozen financial institutions, including Bank of America, Barclays, BNP Paribas, Citigroup, and Wells Fargo, faced allegations of attempting to manipulate the ISDAfix rate used for derivative contracts. The allegations were based on a research conducted and compiled by Fideres, which alleged that the defendant banks had submitted the same or virtually the same dollar ISDAfix rate quotes almost every day from 2009 to 2012, “down to five decimal points," resulting in the official ISDAfix rate and the banks’ contributions being identical to the ICAP reference rate "well over 90% of the time for at least four years.” The allegations were litigated as Alaska Electrical Pension Fund v. Bank of America in the United States District Court for the Southern District of New York, which recovered a total of $504.5 million for the class. The last of the settlements received final approval in November 2018.

=== Steinhoff Securities Litigation ===
Burford Capital represented institutional investors securing substantial recovery from Steinhoff International's €6.5 billion accounting fraud. Fideres provided expert analysis on share price inflation and individual claimant losses across numerous portfolios, achieving a 100% acceptance rate of claims.

== Recent Research and Litigation Support ==
Fideres continues to support high-profile litigation across multiple jurisdictions. Recent work includes expert reports filed in cases such as Bush v. Blink Charging Company, Bernstein v. Ginkgo Bioworks Holdings, Theodore v. PureCycle Technologies, In re Romeo Power Inc. Securities Litigation, Snow v. Align Technology, Inc., and Bond v. Clover Health Investments, Corp. The firm has also been involved in landmark Section 90 FSMA litigation and various antitrust cases involving Google and Apple.

== See also ==
- LIBOR scandal
- Treasury Select Committee
- Tether (cryptocurrency)
- Economic consulting
- Litigation funding
- Compass Lexecon
- Analysis Group
- Bates White
- Berkeley Research Group
- Brattle Group
- Charles River Associates
- Cornerstone Research
- NERA Economic Consulting
