= Inside Job (2010 film) =

2010 documentary film by Charles Ferguson

- Theatrical release poster
- Directed by: Charles Ferguson
- Written by: Charles Ferguson; Chad Beck; Adam Bolt
- Produced by: Audrey Marrs; Charles Ferguson
- Narrated by: Matt Damon
- Cinematography: Svetlana Cvetko; Kalyanee Mam
- Edited by: Chad Beck; Adam Bolt
- Music by: Alex Heffes
- Distributed by: Sony Pictures Classics
- Release dates: May 16, 2010 (Cannes); October 8, 2010 (United States)
- Running time: 108 minutes
- Country: United States
- Language: English
- Budget: $2 million
- Box office: $7.9 million

Inside Job is a 2010 American documentary film, directed by Charles Ferguson, about the 2008 financial crisis. Ferguson, who began researching in 2008, said the film is about "the systemic corruption of the United States by the financial services industry and the consequences of that systemic corruption", amongst them conflicts of interest of academic research, which led to improved disclosure standards by the American Economic Association. In five parts, the film explores how changes in the policy environment and banking practices led to the 2008 financial crisis.

The film was acclaimed by film critics, who praised its pacing, research, and exposition of complex material. It was screened at the 2010 Cannes Film Festival in May 2010 and, on February 27, 2011, won Best Documentary Feature at the 83rd Academy Awards.

== Synopsis ==
The film begins by examining the effects of the government of Iceland's shift toward deregulation in 2000, which included the privatization of its banks. When Lehman Brothers went bankrupt and AIG collapsed, Iceland and the rest of the world went into a global recession.

=== Part I: How We Got Here ===
The American financial industry was regulated from 1941 to 1981, followed by a long period of deregulation. At the end of the 1980s, a savings and loan crisis cost taxpayers approximately $124 billion. In the late 1990s, the financial sector had consolidated into a few giant firms. In March 2000, the Internet stock bubble burst because investment banks promoted Internet companies they knew would fail, resulting in $5 trillion in investor losses. In the 1990s, derivatives became popular in the industry and added instability. Efforts to regulate derivatives were thwarted by the Commodity Futures Modernization Act of 2000, backed by several key officials. In the 2000s, the industry was dominated by five investment banks (Goldman Sachs, Morgan Stanley, Lehman Brothers, Merrill Lynch, and Bear Stearns), two financial conglomerates (Citigroup and JPMorgan Chase), three securitized insurance companies (AIG, MBIA, AMBAC) and the three rating agencies (Moody's, Standard & Poor's, and Fitch). Investment banks bundled mortgages with other loans and debts into collateralized debt obligations (CDOs), which they sold to investors. Rating agencies gave many CDOs AAA ratings. Subprime loans led to predatory lending. Many home owners were given loans they could never repay.

=== Part II: The Bubble (2001–2007) ===
During the housing boom, the ratio of money borrowed by investment banks versus the banks' own assets reached unprecedented levels. Speculators could buy credit default swaps (CDSs), which were akin to an insurance policy, to bet against CDOs they did not own. Numerous CDOs were backed by subprime mortgages. Goldman-Sachs sold more than $3 billion worth of CDOs in the first half of 2006. Goldman also bet against the low-value CDOs, telling investors they were high-quality. The three biggest ratings agencies contributed to the problem, with AAA-rated instruments rocketing from a mere handful in 2000 to over 4,000 in 2006. There were some warnings about the growing risks in the financial system, including from Raghuram Rajan, then the chief economist of the IMF, who, at the Federal Reserve's 2005 Jackson Hole conference, identified some risks and proposed policies to address them, though former U.S. Treasury Secretary Lawrence Summers called his warnings "misguided" and Rajan himself a "luddite".

=== Part III: The Crisis ===
The market for CDOs collapsed and investment banks were left with hundreds of billions of dollars in loans, CDOs, and real estate they could not unload. The Great Recession began in November 2007, and in March 2008, Bear Stearns ran out of cash. In September, the federal government took over Fannie Mae and Freddie Mac, which had been on the brink of collapse. Two days later, Lehman Brothers collapsed. These entities all had AA or AAA ratings within days of being bailed out. Merrill Lynch, on the edge of collapse, was acquired by Bank of America. Henry Paulson and Timothy Geithner decided that Lehman must go into bankruptcy, which resulted in a collapse of the commercial paper market. On September 17, the insolvent AIG was taken over by the government. The next day, Paulson and Fed chairman Ben Bernanke asked Congress for $700 billion to bail out the banks. The global financial system became paralyzed. On October 3, 2008, President George W. Bush signed the Troubled Asset Relief Program, but global stock markets continued to fall. Layoffs and foreclosures continued with unemployment rising to 10% in the US and the European Union. By December 2008, GM and Chrysler also faced bankruptcy. Foreclosures in the U.S. reached unprecedented levels.

=== Part IV: Accountability ===
Top executives of the insolvent companies walked away with their personal fortunes intact and avoided prosecution. The executives had hand-picked their boards of directors, which handed out billions in bonuses after the government bailout. The major banks grew in power and doubled anti-reform efforts. Many academic economists who had advocated for deregulation for decades and helped shape U.S. policy still opposed reform following the 2008 financial crisis. Firms involved were the Analysis Group, Charles River Associates, Compass Lexecon, and the Law and Economics Consulting Group (LECG). Many of these economists were paid consultants to companies and other groups involved in the financial crisis, conflicts of interest that were often not disclosed in their research papers.

=== Part V: Where We Are Now ===
Tens of thousands of U.S. factory workers were laid off. The incoming Obama administration's financial reforms were weak, and there was no significant proposed regulation of the practices of ratings agencies, lobbyists, or executive compensation. Geithner became Treasury Secretary. Martin Feldstein, Laura Tyson, and Lawrence Summers were all top economic advisers to Obama. Bernanke was reappointed Chair of the Federal Reserve. European nations imposed strict regulations on bank compensation, but the U.S. resisted them.

== Interviewees ==
- Matt Damon as Self – Narrator (voice)
- Gylfi Zoega as Self – Professor of Economics, University of Iceland
- Andri Snær Magnasonas Self – Writer & Filmmaker
- Sigridur Benediktsdottir as Self – Special Investigative Committee, Icelandic Parliament
- Paul Volcker as Self – Former Federal Reserve Chairman
- Dominique Strauss-Kahn as Self – Managing Director, International Monetary Fund
- George Soros as Self – Chairman, Soros Fund Management
- Barney Frank as Self – Chairman, Financial Services Committee
- David McCormick as Self – Under Secretary of the Treasury, Bush Administration
- Scott Talbott as Self – Chief Lobbyist, Financial Services Roundtable
- Andrew Sheng as Self – Chief Adviser, China Banking Regulatory Commission
- Lee Hsien Loong as Self – Prime Minister, Singapore (as Hsien Loong Lee)
- Christine Lagarde as Self – Finance Minister, France
- Gillian Tett as Self – U.S. Managing Editor, The Financial Times
- Nouriel Roubini as Self – Professor, NYU Business School
- R. Glenn Hubbard as Self – Chief Economic Adviser, Bush Administration
- Eliot Spitzer as Self – Former Governor, New York
- Samuel Hayes as Self – Professor Emeritus of Investment Banking, Harvard Business School
- Charles Morris as Self – Author, The Two Trillion Dollar Meltdown
- Robert Gnaizda as Self – Former Director, Greenlining Institute
- Willem Buiter as Self – Chief Economist, Citigroup
- Andrew Lo as Self – Professor & Director, MIT Laboratory for Financial Engineering
- Michael Greenberger as Self – Former Deputy Director, Commodity Futures Trading Commission
- Satyajit Das as Self – Derivatives Consultant
- Frank Partnoy as Self – Professor of Law & Finance, University of California, San Diego
- Eric Halperin as Self – Director, Center for Responsible Learning
- Martin Wolf as Self – Chief Economics Commentator, The Financial Times
- Kenneth Rogoff as Self – Professor of Economics, Harvard (as Prof. Ken Rogoff)
- Daniel Alpert as Self – Managing Director, Westwood Capital
- Raghuram Rajan as Self – Chief Economist, International Monetary Fund
- Lawrence McDonald as Self – Former Vice President, Lehman Brothers
- Harvey Miller as Self – Lehman's Bankruptcy Lawyer
- Jeffrey Lane as Self – Vice Chairman, Lehman Brothers
- Jonathan Alpert as Self – Therapist
- Kristin M. Davis as Self – Manhattan Madam
- Allan Sloan as Self – Senior Editor, Fortune Magazine
- William Ackman as Self – Hedge Fund Manager (as Bill Ackman)
- Jerome Fons as Self – Former Managing Director, Moody's Rating Agency
- Frederic Mishkin as Self – Governor, Federal Reserve
- Simon Johnson as Self – Professor, MIT
- Joanna Xu as Self – Former Factory Worker
- Patrick Daniel as Self – Editor-in-Chief, Singapore Press Holdings
- Columba Ramos as Self – Victim of Fraud
- Eric Evanouskas as Self – Volunteer, Catholic Charities
- Steven A. Stephen as Self – Former Construction Worker
- Martin Feldstein as Self – Professor of Economics, Harvard
- John Campbell as Self – Chairman, Harvard Economics Department

== Reception ==
=== Favorable response ===
The film was met with critical acclaim. On review aggregator website Rotten Tomatoes, it holds an approval rating of 98% based on 148 reviews, with an average rating of 8.2/10; the site's "critics consensus" reads: "Disheartening but essential viewing, Charles Ferguson's documentary explores the 2008 Global Financial Crisis with exemplary rigor." On Metacritic, the film has a weighted average score of 88 out of 100 based on 27 critics, indicating "universal acclaim", and, in 2011, Jason Dietz of Metacritic ranked the film as the best film yet made about the "ongoing financial crisis".

Roger Ebert described the film as "an angry, well-argued documentary about how the American housing industry set out deliberately to defraud the ordinary American investor". A. O. Scott of The New York Times wrote that "Mr. Ferguson has summoned the scourging moral force of a pulpit-shaking sermon. That he delivers it with rigor, restraint and good humor makes his case all the more devastating". Logan Hill of New York magazine characterized the film as a "rip-snorting, indignant documentary", noting the "effective presence" of narrator Matt Damon. Peter Bradshaw of The Guardian said it was "as gripping as any thriller", and also noted the influence of Michael Moore on the film, which he described as "a Moore film with the gags and stunts removed". Duane Byrge of the Hollywood Reporter said it deserved a "triple-A rating," writing: "'Inside Job' is no talking-heads drone. It's a lively, droll and acidic shakedown of the insiders who perpetrated this crisis." Kenneth Turan of the Los Angeles Times hailed the documentary as a "powerhouse" that presents its complex subject matter with "cinematic verve."

The film was selected for a special screening at the 2010 Cannes Film Festival. A reviewer writing from Cannes characterized it as "a complex story told exceedingly well and with a great deal of unalloyed anger".

=== Critical response ===
In 2010, economist Gene Epstein, writing for Barron's, criticized the documentary for presenting an incomplete and biased view of the 2008 financial crisis. While acknowledging elements of truth in the narrative about Wall Street greed, Epstein argued that it failed to adequately explore the proactive role of government policy in the crisis, particularly the influence of Fannie Mae and Freddie Mac.

Shawn Levy of The Oregonian rated the film B−, writing: "Whether the film's anatomy and analysis of the crash are accurate, they haven't been rendered in a way that's genuinely worth paying contemporary movie ticket prices to learn about it."

== Accolades ==
| Award | Date of ceremony | Category | Recipient(s) | Result |
|---|---|---|---|---|
| Academy Awards | February 27, 2011 | Best Documentary Feature | Charles H. Ferguson and Audrey Marrs | Won |
| Chicago Film Critics Association Awards | December 20, 2010 | Best Documentary Feature | | Nominated |
| Directors Guild of America Awards | December 29, 2010 | Best Documentary | | Won |
| Gotham Independent Film Awards | November 29, 2010 | Best Documentary | | Nominated |
| Online Film Critics Society Awards | January 3, 2011 | Best Documentary | | Nominated |
| Writers Guild of America Awards | February 5, 2011 | Best Documentary Screenplay | | Won |

== See also ==
- 2008 financial crisis
- Emergency Economic Stabilization Act of 2008
- Troubled Asset Relief Program
- DISCLOSE Act
- Wall Street reform
- Systemic corruption

=== Films and series related to the 2008 financial crisis ===
- The Mayfair Set (1999)
- I.O.U.S.A. (2008)
- Let's Make Money (2008)
- Capitalism: A Love Story (2009)
- The Last Days of Lehman Brothers (2009)
- Generation Zero (2010)
- Margin Call (2011)
- Debtocracy (2011)
- Too Big to Fail (2011)
- Heist: Who Stole the American Dream? (2011)
- The Big Short (2015)
- The Bailout (2018 two part TV Mini-Series about the Post-2008 Irish banking crisis sparked by the 2008 financial crisis and the Great Recession)
