= National Economic Research Associates =

Economic consulting firm

NERA
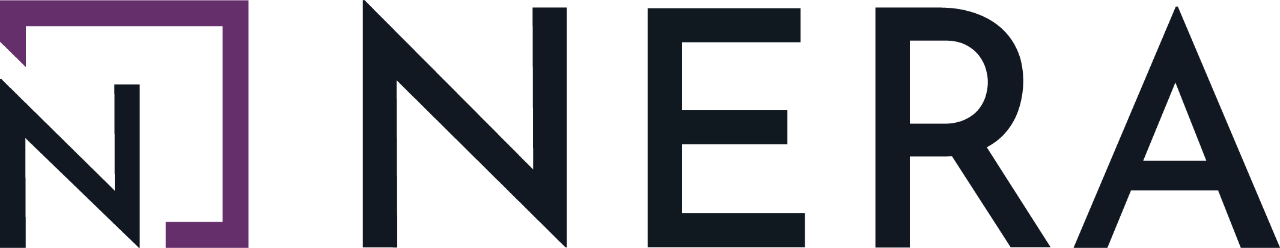
- Company type: Subsidiary
- Industry: Economic consulting
- Founded: April 10, 1961; 64 years ago
- Headquarters: New York, New York
- Key people: Lawrence Wu (president)
- Parent: Oliver Wyman Group; Marsh & McLennan Companies
- Website: nera.com

The National Economic Research Associates (NERA) is an American economic consulting firm headquartered in New York City. Founded in 1961, NERA was the first consulting firm dedicated to methodically applying microeconomic theory to litigation and regulatory matters. The firm applies econometric and statistical analysis to provide strategy, studies, reports, expert testimony, and policy recommendations for government authorities, law firms, and corporations.

== Offices ==
The company is based in the United States and has offices in North America, Europe, Asia, and Australia. NERA employs more than 500 professionals, most of whom have advanced degrees in economics, finance, law or business.

NERA is a part of the Oliver Wyman Group, a subsidiary of the Marsh & McLennan Companies, a global professional services firm.

== Recognition ==
NERA ranked second in Vault's 2018 survey of the top firms in economic consulting. It ranked third in the 2022 ranking, after BCG and Bain. The New York Times called it "one of the country’s oldest and best-known economic consultancies." Laurence Tribe, professor of constitutional law at Harvard Law School, said that NERA is "one of the world's foremost economic consultancies."

In June 2017, President Donald Trump cited statistics from a study by NERA in a speech announcing his plan to pull the United States out of the Paris Agreement. The study, which was prepared to measure the economic impact of hypothetical regulatory actions necessary to meet the goals of the Paris Agreement, was criticized for overestimating the costs of reducing greenhouse gas emissions. In a response, NERA said that the Trump Administration selectively used results of the study that mischaracterized its purpose and analysis.

== See also ==
- Analysis Group
- Bates White
- Berkeley Research Group
- Brattle Group
- Charles River Associates
- Compass Lexecon
- Cornerstone Research
- Fideres
