= Cates =

Cates is a surname. Notable people with the surname include:

- Challen Cates (born 1967), American actress
- Clifton Bledsoe Cates (1893–1970), 19th Commandant of the U.S. Marine Corps
- David Allan Cates (born 1956), American novelist
- Fatima Cates (1865–1900), British Muslim convert and activist
- George Cates (1911–2002), American musical conductor associated with Lawrence Welk
- George Edward Cates (1892–1917), English recipient of the Victoria Cross in World War I
- Gilbert Cates (1934–2011), American film director
- Kristy Cates (born 1977), American stage actress and singer
- Michael Cates (born 1961), Lucasian Professor of Mathematics at Cambridge University
- Miriam Cates (born 1982), British Member of Parliament elected 2019
- Noah Cates (born 1999), American ice hockey player
- Opie Cates (1909–1987), American band leader
- Phoebe Cates (born 1963), American film actress
- Richard Cates (1925–2011), American lawyer and politician

== Fictional ==
- Bertram Cates, character in the 1955 play Inherit the Wind by Jerome Lawrence and Robert E. Lee
