= Berkeley Research Group =

Global Consulting Company

Berkeley Research Group, LLC
- Trade name: BRG
- Type: Limited liability company
- Industry: Professional services
- Founded: Emeryville, California (2010)
- Headquarters: Washington, D.C.
- Area served: Worldwide
- Key people: David Teece (Executive Chairman); David Kaplan (Executive Director); Tri MacDonald (Principal Executive Officer and President); Philip Rowley (Executive Director and Chief Revenue Officer); Dave M. Johnson (Senior Vice President and CFO); Eric Miller (Senior Vice President and General Counsel)
- Services: Expert testimony Litigation and regulatory support Consulting; Strategic advice Document and data analytics
- Number of employees: 1,600 (2024)
- Website: www.thinkbrg.com

Berkeley Research Group, LLC (BRG) is a global consulting firm that helps organizations with assistance in disputes and investigations, corporate finance, and performance improvement and advisory. BRG is headquartered in Washington, D.C., with offices across the United States and in Asia, Australia, Canada, Latin America, the Middle East and the United Kingdom. As of January 2024, it has more than 1,600 employees across more than forty offices.

== History ==
BRG was co-founded in February 2010 by a group including Dr. David Teece, who has served as its executive chairman.

In March 2025, BRG disclosed that it had discovered on 2 March "suspicious network activity including indicators of compromise consistent with a ransomware attack". Bloomberg News reported that the breach occurred as banks were finalising debt financing for TowerBrook Capital Partners' buyout of the firm, and that the attacker claimed to have stolen data and encrypted files on BRG's network.

In May 2025, The Wall Street Journal reported that the attack exposed data from multiple Catholic diocese bankruptcy cases in which BRG served as a financial adviser. Subsequent court filings and reporting said the breach drew scrutiny from the U.S. Trustee over whether BRG should continue in those roles.

== Practice Areas ==
BRG provides economic, financial, and analytical advice for a range of disciplines:

- antitrust and competition policy
- class action certification
- construction
- corporate governance
- damages analysis
- energy
- environment and natural resources
- finance and valuation
- financial reporting evaluation and fraud
- forensic financial investigations
- health analytics
- information technology
- insurance and reinsurance
- intellectual property
- international and domestic arbitration
- labor and employment
- public policy
- security issues.

BRG also advises clients in industry sectors with compliance, business process improvement, and strategy consulting.

== Notable Employees Past and Present ==
- David Teece
- Robert Rogowsky
- Laura Tyson
- Leonard Waverman

== Reception ==
Charles H. Ferguson, author of Predator Nation: Corporate Criminals, Political Corruption, and the Hijacking of America, criticized Berkeley Research Group for focusing primarily "on helping companies avoid or influence legislation, public debate, regulation, prosecution, class-action lawsuits, antitrust judgments, and taxes."

== See also ==
- Analysis Group
- Bates White
- Brattle Group
- Charles River Associates
- Compass Lexecon
- Cornerstone Research
- NERA Economic Consulting
