= Jennifer Arcuri =

American technology entrepreneur (born 1985)

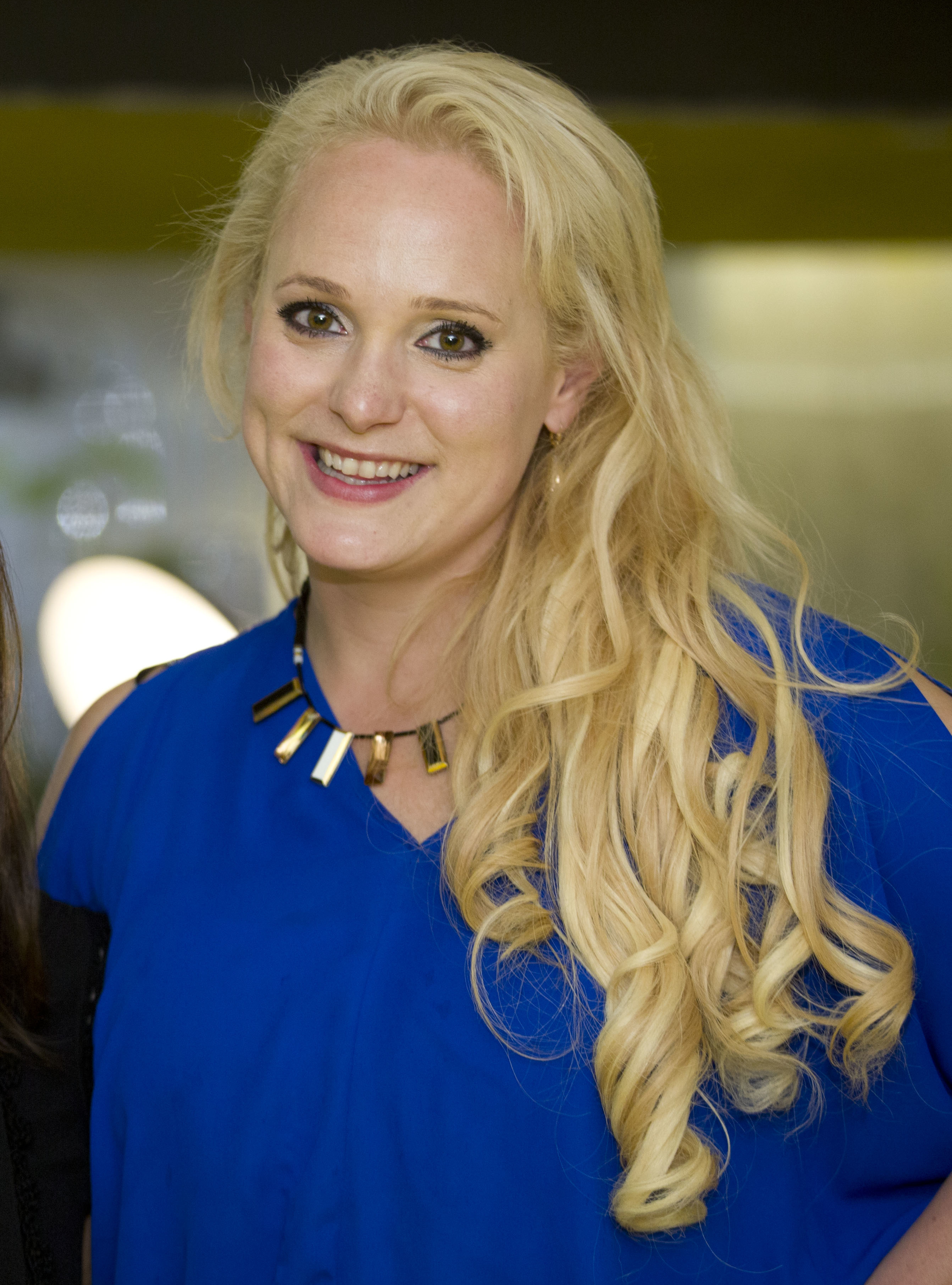
- Arcuri in 2015
- Born: Jennifer Marie Arcuri; February 1985 (age 41)
- Education: University of Wisconsin-Madison; Hult International Business School
- Occupation: Technology entrepreneur
- Years active: 2011–present
- Children: 1
- Relatives: Richard Cates (grandfather)

Jennifer Marie Arcuri (born February 1985) is an American technology entrepreneur. She lived in London from 2011 to 2018, before moving back to California. Self-described as an "ethical hacker", she founded the white hat consultancy Hacker House in 2016 and organized the Innotech Network from 2012. Her connection to then Mayor of London Boris Johnson from 2012 came to national attention in the UK in September 2019 when he became Prime Minister, triggering investigations into alleged conflicts of interest. She said in 2021 that she had an affair with him from 2012 to 2016.

== Career ==
Arcuri previously lived in California and New York. She studied politics at the University of Wisconsin-Madison, theatre at Pace University in New York, filmmaking at the University of Southern California, and film at the American University in Paris for a summer. She briefly modeled and acted, including in a short film titled Commute. In California, she worked in film, including digital distribution, and production, sending a short film titled La Valise to Cannes. Arcuri owned a video streaming site for filmmakers, Ubroadcast, until selling it to Diamond I in 2009.

=== Technology ===
In 2008, Arcuri first visited London to take part in a Bollywood film, Naughty @ 40. She moved to London in early 2011. Arcuri studied for an MBA at Hult International Business School, where she met Tom Hayes and founded software company Title X Technology with him in 2012, using developers in Bulgaria. She defended Hayes in the Wall Street Journal after he came under investigation for the Libor scandal in 2013, for which he was later sentenced to 14 years in jail.

From 2012, Arcuri organized the Innotech Summit in London. She founded the Tech Hotel in Shoreditch and was involved with Founders for Schools. She also founded Playbox, a video social network for entrepreneurs. She received an entrepreneur's visa after three years in the UK, after raising over £200,000 in funding for Innotech. By 2016, Innotech Network was noted as a meeting place for the tech industry and policymakers such as Boris Johnson.

In November 2016, she worked with Sky News on a report that showed that the UK NHS had spent nothing on cyber-security during 2015; she noted that security was generally lacking in NHS trusts.

In 2016, she headed the Tech London Advocates working group on cyber tech. She also founded Hacker House in 2016, a consultancy that advises and trains on cybersecurity, coming out of a "Legislating LulzSec" event run by Innotech in October 2014. Hacker House received a grant from the UK Department for Digital, Culture, Media and Sport Cyber Skills Immediate Impact Fund in 2019, sharing £500,000 with three other projects.

Arcuri has encouraged other women and girls to become involved in the sector and ran the PinkSheet, a list of UK women expert professionals.

==== Recognition ====
Arcuri was recognized several times by Computer Weekly: in 2016, she was named as one of five "rising stars" among women in UK IT; she was named 18th of 50 of the "most influential women in UK tech" in 2017; she was longlisted for the same award in 2018 and 2019.

SC Magazine listed Arcuri among twenty "women to watch" in UK cybersecurity in 2017.

=== Relationship to Boris Johnson ===
Arcuri had a close friendship with then-Mayor of London Boris Johnson, with the Sunday Times describing him as a regular visitor to her flat, and implying they were in a sexual relationship. Innotech, her company, was awarded £10,000 from a mayoral fund in 2013, followed the next year by Arcuri being awarded £15,000 from a government programme. Johnson intervened to allow her onto three trade mission trips. the Sunday Times claimed in September 2019 that Johnson failed to declare his personal relationship as a conflict of interest.

Later that month, the Greater London Authority referred Johnson and his actions in the matter to the Independent Office for Police Conduct (IOPC) "so it can assess whether or not it is necessary to investigate the former mayor of London for the criminal offence of misconduct in public office". The IOPC is involved because the Mayor is also London's police and crime commissioner. The London Assembly commenced its own investigation, but paused it at the IOPC's request in order to avoid overlap. On 9 November 2019, it was revealed that the IOPC, which had been due to publish a report on its investigation, had decided to do so after the general election of 12 December.

On 22 May 2020, the IOPC announced that they would not proceed with a criminal investigation. The IOPC said in its statement "While there was no evidence that Mr Johnson influenced the payment of sponsorship monies or participation in trade missions, there was evidence to suggest that those officers making decisions about sponsorship monies and attendance on trade missions thought that there was a close relationship between Mr Johnson and Ms Arcuri, and this influenced their decision-making."

On 17 October 2020, Arcuri said that her relationship with Johnson had been sexual. On 28 March 2021, she said their affair lasted from 2012 to 2016.

=== Promotion of conspiracy theories ===
In December 2021, Vice News reported that Arcuri was promoting QAnon and anti-vaccine conspiracy theories on her Twitter account and Telegram channel.

== Personal life ==
Arcuri's grandfather was lawyer Richard Cates. His daughter Christine Jendrzejewski is Arcuri's mother. Arcuri is married to Matthew Hickey, the co-director of Hacker House, with whom she had a daughter in 2017. They moved to Orange County, California in June 2018. According to Andrew Neil, who is suing Arcuri for libel, since January 2021, Arcuri has lived in Panama City, Florida.
