= Robert Gnaizda =

American lawyer (1936–2020)

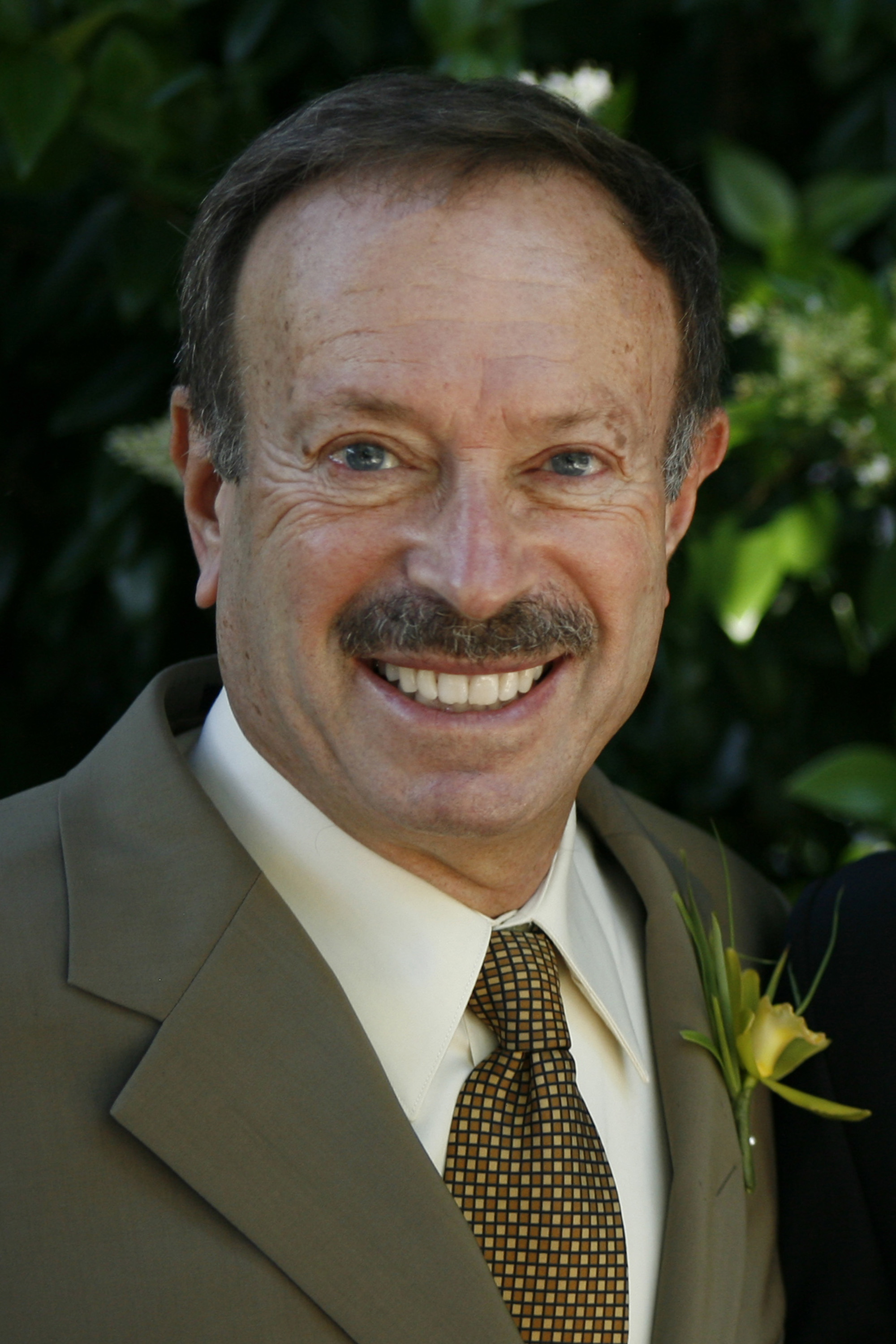
- Born: August 6, 1936; Brooklyn, New York City, New York, United States
- Died: July 11, 2020 (aged 83); San Francisco, California, United States
- Education: Columbia University (BA); Yale Law School (JD)
- Occupation: General Counsel
- Spouse: Phyllis Lisa Linton Ellen Lorraine Eatough Claudia P. Viek
- Children: 2

Robert Leslie "Bob" Gnaizda (/ɡəˈneɪzdə/ gə-NAYZ-də) (August 6, 1936 – July 11, 2020) was the co-founder, General Counsel and Policy Director for the Greenlining Institute based in Berkeley, California. He was known as an advocate of social justice for over 40 years, and was chief counsel in over 100 class action court and administrative cases focusing on minority economic empowerment and civil rights.

== Early life and education ==
Gnaizda was born in Brooklyn, in New York City, NY, to Samuel and Sandra (née Ackerman) Gnaizda. He was raised in the Brownsville section of the borough. After Stuyvesant High School, he was graduated from Columbia College of Columbia University in 1957 and Yale Law School in 1960. He was admitted to the New York Bar that same year and the California Bar on January 9, 1962.

== Career ==
He was the chief counsel for America’s first legal service program for rural families, California Rural Legal Assistance, which was founded in 1966 by James D. Lorenz and received numerous national awards as the most outstanding legal service program in the United States. Gnaizda was Statewide Litigation Director for California Rural Legal Assistance, representing with low-income and mistreated farm workers in California's Salinas Valley during the era of Cesar Chavez.

In 1971, Gnaizda co-founded the western United States’ first public interest law firm, Public Advocates, along with attorneys J. Anthony Kline, Sidney M. Wolinsky, and Peter E. Sitkin. Beginning in 1975, he served in the administration of California Governor Jerry Brown as California's Health Director and Chief Deputy Secretary for Health, Welfare and Prisons under Secretary Mario Obledo. After leaving the administration in March 1976, Gnaizda returned to practice as public interest attorney with Public Advocates and was the State Bar representative for the Federal Judicial Selection Committee.

Gnaizda cofounded the Greenlining Institute in 1993, and worked with that organization until his retirement.

In the Oscar Award-winning documentary film Inside Job (2010) by Charles H. Ferguson about the 2008 financial crisis, Gnaizda "characterizes the Obama administration as 'a Wall Street government,' a take Mr. Ferguson clearly endorses."

After retiring from the Greenlining Institute, he joined National Asian American Coalition and National Diversity Coalition as their general counsel, where he worked with Faith Bautista to empower minorities in home ownership and economic development.

== Personal life and death ==
Gnaizda was married three times: to the former Phyllis Lisa Linton, Ellen L. Eatough, and Claudia P. Viek. He fathered two sons with Eatough, Matt and Josh. He died in San Francisco at the age of 83.

== Awards and honors ==
In 2009, he was recipient of The Loren Miller Legal Services Award. The award is given annually and honors an attorney who has demonstrated long-term commitment to legal services and who has personally done significant work in extending legal services to the poor. In 2016 he received the Yale Latino Law Students Association's Alumni Award.
