= Compass Lexecon =

Economic consulting company

- Industry: Economic consulting
- Founded: 1977
- Headquarters: Chicago, Illinois, U.S.
- Number of locations: 23 (2022)
- Area served: Americas; Europe; Middle East; Asia
- Key people: Daniel R. Fischel (Chairman and President)
- Products: Business analysis, Competition law, Economic consulting
- Number of employees: 500+ worldwide (2020)
- Parent: FTI Consulting, Inc.
- Website: www.compasslexecon.com

Compass Lexecon is a global economic consulting firm founded in 1977 with headquarters in Chicago, Illinois. It provides analysis of economic issues pertaining to competition practice and competition law for use in legal and regulatory proceedings, strategic decisions, and public policy debates. Compass Lexecon operates as a wholly owned subsidiary of the parent firm FTI Consulting.

Chairman and president is Daniel Fischel. Compass Lexecon has 23 office locations in the Americas, Europe, Middle East, and Asia.

== History ==
Compass Lexecon LLC was formed in January 2008 through the combination of the economic consulting firm Competition Policy Associates (COMPASS), founded in 2003, and the competition law firm Lexecon, founded in 1977.

In May 2013, Compass Lexecon acquired Princeton Economics Group, which provides economic research, data analysis and testimony to law firms and corporations.

== Practice areas ==
Compass Lexecon advertises consulting services in the following practice areas:

- Antitrust & Competition
- Auctions
- Damages
- Derivatives & Structured Finance
- ERISA Litigation
- Energy, Healthcare
- Intellectual Property
- International Arbitration
- Regulatory Investigations
- Securities & Financial Markets
- Telecommunications, Transportation
- Valuation & Financial Analysis

== See also ==
- Analysis Group
- Bates White
- Berkeley Research Group
- Brattle Group
- Charles River Associates
- Cornerstone Research
- Econic Partners
- Fideres
- Frontier Economics
- NERA Economic Consulting
- Oxera
- RBB Economics
