= Forex scandal =

Financial scandal

The forex scandal (also known as the forex probe) is a 2013 financial scandal that involves the revelation, and subsequent investigation, that banks colluded for at least a decade to manipulate exchange rates on the forex market for their own financial gain. Market regulators in Asia, Switzerland, the United Kingdom, and the United States began to investigate the $4.7 trillion per day foreign exchange market (forex) after Bloomberg News reported in June 2013 that currency dealers said they had been front-running client orders and rigging the foreign exchange benchmark WM/Reuters rates by colluding with counterparts and pushing through trades before and during the 60-second windows when the benchmark rates are set. The behavior occurred daily in the spot foreign-exchange market and went on for at least a decade according to currency traders.

== Background ==
The foreign exchange market (forex) had been largely unregulated, because regulators considered it "too big to be manipulated".

== Investigation ==
Secret trading chatrooms

Don't want other numpty's in mkt to know [about information exchanged within the group], but not only that is he gonna protect us like we protect each other ...

— Citibank trader, on a prospective new member to the cartel chatroom

At the center of the investigation were the transcripts of electronic chatrooms in which senior currency traders discussed with their competitors at other banks the types and volume of the trades they planned to place. The chatrooms had names such as "The Cartel", "The Bandits’ Club", "One Team, One Dream" and "The Mafia". The discussions in the chatrooms were interspersed with jokes about manipulating the forex market and repeated references to alcohol, drugs, and women. Regulators were particularly focusing in on one small exclusive chatroom which was variously called The Cartel or The Mafia. The chatroom was used by some of the most influential traders in London and membership in the chatroom was highly sought after. Among The Cartel's members were Richard Usher, a former Royal Bank of Scotland (RBS) senior trader who went to JPMorgan as head of spot foreign exchange trading in 2010, Rohan Ramchandani, Citigroup’s head of European spot trading, Matt Gardiner, who joined Standard Chartered after working at UBS and Barclays, and Chris Ashton, head of voice spot trading at Barclays. Two of these senior traders, Richard Usher and Rohan Ramchandani, were members of the 13-member Bank of England Joint Standing Committee's chief dealers group.

At least 15 banks including Barclays, HSBC, and Goldman Sachs disclosed investigations by regulators. Barclays, Citigroup, and JPMorgan Chase all suspended or placed on leave senior currency traders. Deutsche Bank, continental Europe’s largest lender, was also cooperating with requests for information from regulators. Barclays, Citigroup, Deutsche Bank, HSBC, JPMorgan Chase, Lloyds, RBS, Standard Chartered, UBS and the Bank of England as of June 2014 had suspended, placed on leave, or fired some 40 forex employees. Citigroup had also fired its head of European spot foreign exchange trading, Rohan Ramchandani. Reuters reported hundreds of traders around the world could be implicated in the scandal.

The European Commission on Competition concluded its investigation in 2021, fining Barclays, HSBC, The Royal Bank of Scotland (now NatWest), UBS, and Credit Suisse a total of €344 million for participating in an FX spot trading cartel, known as the “Sterling Lads” and related cartels, in which traders shared sensitive pricing information via online chatrooms.

In July 2025, the General Court of the European Union affirmed Credit Suisse’s participation in the cartel but reduced its fine from €83.2 million to approximately €28.9 million, after finding that the European Commission had incorrectly calculated the penalty.

== Effects ==
As of December 2014, the monetary losses caused by manipulation of the forex market were estimated to represent $11.5 billion per year for Britain’s 20.7 million pension holders alone (£7.5B/year). The manipulations affected customers all around the world, for over a decade. The manipulations' overall estimated cost is not yet fully known.

== Fines ==
Fines imposed by UK, US, and Swiss authorities in Forex Scandal (US$ millions)
Bank	CFTC	DFS	DOJ	FCA	Fed	FINMA	OCC	Total
BofA					205		250	455
Barclays	400	635	650	441	342			2,468
Citibank	310		925	358	342		350	2,285
HSBC	275			343				618
JPMorgan	310		550	352	342		350	1,904
RBS	290		395	344	274			1,303
UBS	290			371	342	145		1,148
Total	1,875	635	2,520	2,209	1,847	145	950	10,181

On 12 November 2014, the United Kingdom's Financial Conduct Authority (FCA) imposed fines totaling $1.7 billion on five banks for failing to control business practices in their G10 spot foreign exchange trading operations, specifically: Citibank $358 million, HSBC $343 million, JPMorgan $352 million, RBS $344 million and UBS $371 million. The FCA determined that between 1 January 2008 and 15 October 2013 the five banks failed to manage risks around client confidentiality, conflict of interest, and trading conduct. The banks used confidential customer order information to collude with other banks to manipulate the G10 foreign exchange currency rates and profit illegally at the expense of their customers and the market. On the same day the United States Commodity Futures Trading Commission (CFTC) in coordination with the FCA imposed collective fines of $1.4 billion against the same five banks for attempted manipulation of, and for aiding and abetting other banks’ attempts to manipulate, global foreign exchange benchmark rates to benefit the positions of certain traders. The CFTC specifically fined: $310 million each for Citibank and JPMorgan, $290 million each for RBS and UBS, and $275 million for HSBC.

The CFTC found that currency traders at the five banks coordinated their trading with traders at other banks in order to manipulate the foreign exchange benchmark rates, including the 16:00 WM/Reuters rates. Currency traders at the banks used private chatrooms to communicate and plan their attempts to manipulate the foreign exchange benchmark rates. In these chatrooms, traders at the banks disclosed confidential customer order information and trading positions, changed trading positions to accommodate the interests of the collective group, and agreed on trading strategies as part of an effort by the group to manipulate different foreign exchange benchmark rates. These chatrooms were often exclusive and invitation only.

On 20 May 2015, the five banks pleaded guilty to felony charges by the United States Department of Justice and agreed to pay fines totaling more than $5.7 billion. Four of the banks, including Barclays, Citigroup, JP Morgan, and Royal Bank of Scotland pleaded guilty to manipulation of the foreign markets; while the others had already been fined in settlements from the November 2014 investigation, Barclays had not been involved and was fined $2.4 billion. UBS also pleaded guilty to committing wire fraud and agreed to a $203 million fine. A sixth bank, Bank of America, while not found guilty, agreed to a fine of $204 million for unsafe practices in foreign markets.

On 18 November 2015 Barclays was fined an additional $150m for automated electronic foreign exchange misconduct.

== Criminal proceedings ==
On 19 December 2014 the first and only known arrest was made in relation to the scandal. The arrest of a former RBS trader took place in Billericay, Essex, and was conducted by the City of London Police and the Serious Fraud Office.

Several traders have been incarcerated for market manipulation in recent years. The longest conviction was that of Tom Hayes; Hayes, a British citizen and ex-UBS trader, received a 14-year sentence in 2015.

== Reforms ==
As of November 2014, respective authorities announced remediation programmes aimed at repairing trust in their banking systems and the wider foreign exchange market place. In the United Kingdom, the FCA has stated that the changes to be made at each firm will depend on a number of factors, including the size of the firm, its market share, impact, remedial work already undertaken, and the role the firm plays in the market. The remediation programme was to require firms to review their IT systems in relation to their spot FX business, as the banks relied on legacy technologies that allow for the existence of dark-data silos within which manipulation is able to occur unnoticed by compliance systems.

In Switzerland, the Swiss Financial Market Supervisory Authority announced in December 2014, that for a period of two years UBS would be limited to a maximum annual variable compensation to 200% of the basic salary for foreign exchange and precious metals employees globally. UBS was instructed to automate at least 95% of its global foreign exchange trading, while effective measures must be taken to manage conflicts of interest with a particular focus on organisational separation of client and proprietary trading.

As of May 2015, the window in which the daily 4pm fix is calculated was extended to five minutes as recommended by the Financial Stability Board, a watchdog advising the G20 finance ministers and the Bank for International Settlements tried to get banks to agree a unified code of conduct.

== See also ==
- Fideres
- Libor scandal, 2012
- White-collar crime
