= Cornerstone Research =

American consulting firm

- Type: Private
- Industry: Economic consulting
- Founded: 1989
- Founder: Cynthia L. Zollinger; Jim Malernee; Chris Nelson
- Headquarters: San Francisco, California
- Number of locations: 9 across United States, United Kingdom, and Belgium
- Key people: Bryan Ricchetti, CEO; Kristin Feitzinger, Board Chair; Phil Leslie, Chief Technology and Innovation Officer
- Services: Economic and financial consulting Expert testimony
- Number of employees: 1000+
- Website: www.cornerstone.com

Cornerstone Research is an economic consulting firm with offices in the United States, United Kingdom, and Belgium. It provides economic and financial analysis and expert testimony to attorneys, corporations and government agencies involved in complex litigation and regulatory proceedings.

== Offices ==
Cornerstone Research is headquartered in San Francisco, CA. Other US offices include Boston, MA, New York City, NY, Washington, D.C., Chicago, IL, Menlo Park, CA, and Los Angeles, CA.

In 2014, Cornerstone Research opened its first international office in London, United Kingdom. A second international office opened in Brussels, Belgium in 2023.

== Practice areas ==
Cornerstone Research utilizes both internal and external expert witnesses to provide testimony, utilizing faculty and industry experts.

The company's practice areas include: accounting; antitrust and competition; bankruptcy and financial distress litigation; consumer fraud and product liability; corporate and government investigations; corporate governance; corporate transaction litigation; data analytics; Employee Retirement Income Security Act (ERISA); energy and commodities; financial institutions; intellectual property; international arbitration and litigation; labor and employment; pharmaceuticals and healthcare; real estate; securities; and valuation.

== Publications ==
The firm collaborates on the "Securities Class Action Clearinghouse" in conjunction with the Stanford University Law School. According to a university website, the clearinghouse provides summary information regarding federal class action securities litigation in the United States.

== See also ==
- Analysis Group
- Berkeley Research Group
- Charles River Associates
- Compass Lexecon
- NERA Economic Consulting
