= Bruce E. Stangle =

American economist

Bruce Stangle
- Spouse: Emily Siegel Stangle

Academic background
- Education: Bates College (BA); Massachusetts Institute of Technology (SM, PhD)
- Doctoral advisors: M.A. Adelman, Paul Joskow, Lester Thurow

Academic work
- Discipline: Applied economics, industrial organization, and finance
- Institutions: Massachusetts Institute of Technology (1972–1978)

Bruce Edward Stangle is an American economist who served as the chief executive officer (CEO) of Analysis Group from 1981 to 2004. He and Michael F. Koehn co-founded the management consultancy in 1981 in Boston, Massachusetts. After stepping down as chief executive Stangle continued to lead Analysis Group as chairman until 2016. He began his career as a senior economist for Arthur D. Little from 1978 to 1980.

== Education ==
Stangle graduated from Bates College in 1970 with a B.A. in English. He went on to attend the Massachusetts Institute of Technology (MIT)'s graduate Sloan School of Management, where he received an S.M. in management in 1974 and a Ph.D. in applied economics in 1978. His doctoral dissertation, Price Determination in the Markets for Beef, was advised by MIT professors M.A. Adelman, Paul Joskow, and Lester Thurow.

== Career ==
After graduating from business school, Stangle joined management consulting firm Arthur D. Little as a senior economist in Boston, Massachusetts until 1980. Stangle and Michael F. Koehn co-founded Analysis Group in 1981 as an economic consulting firm focused on litigation and expert testimony. Stangle served as the first chief executive of the firm from its founding to 2004. He continued to lead Analysis Group as chairman of its board of directors until 2016. He serves as an expert witness in litigation cases on class certification, market definition, entry conditions, competitive effects, ERISA, and damages.

Outside of his consulting work, Stangle has served on several boards of directors, written journal articles and been a guest lecturer on antitrust damages. He has been an outside director of Wellington Trust Company, N.A. since 2001. In the summer of 2005, he co-authored an article on behavioral finance and the efficient market hypothesis with economists Burton Malkiel and Sendhil Mullainathan for the Journal of Applied Corporate Finance. In the Fall of 2020, Stangle co-authored an article in the Journal of Retirement on the financial performance of municipal pension systems in Massachusetts.

== Personal life ==
Stangle is married to Emily Siegel Stangle and they have four children.

He served as a trustee for Bates from 1998 to 2012, and has, since then, served as trustee emeritus. Over his fourteen years as trustee, Stangle endowed an economics and law fund, a professorship in applied economics in honor of his mother, and a residential lounge named for his father. At the end of tenure as trustee, the college established the "Stangle Award" for alumni who contribute to professional development of Bates graduates. From 1994 until 1998, Stangle was a member of the Board of Directors of the Massachusetts Technology Development Corporation (now MassVentures). He also served as a member of the Visiting Committee of the Economics Department at the Massachusetts Institute of Technology from 2002 through 2008.

== Publications ==
- Stangle, Bruce E.; Heavner, D. Lee; Lu, Yao; Iselin, Alex; Singh, Priyanka. Fall 2020. "State vs. Local Management of Pension Assets: Effects of the Massachusetts Chapter 68 Public Pension Reform". Journal of Retirement.
- Stangle, Bruce E.; Drum, John; Starfield, Richard. June 2018. "Keeping Covenants: Getting Debt Ratios Right". Journal of Accountancy.
- Stangle, Bruce E.; Malkiel, Burton; Mullainathan, Sendhil. 2005. "Market Efficiency Versus Behavioral Finance". Journal of Applied Corporate Finance; 17(3):74-84

== See also ==
- List of economists
- List of Bates College people
- List of Massachusetts Institute of Technology alumni
