= Daniel Alpert =

American investment banker

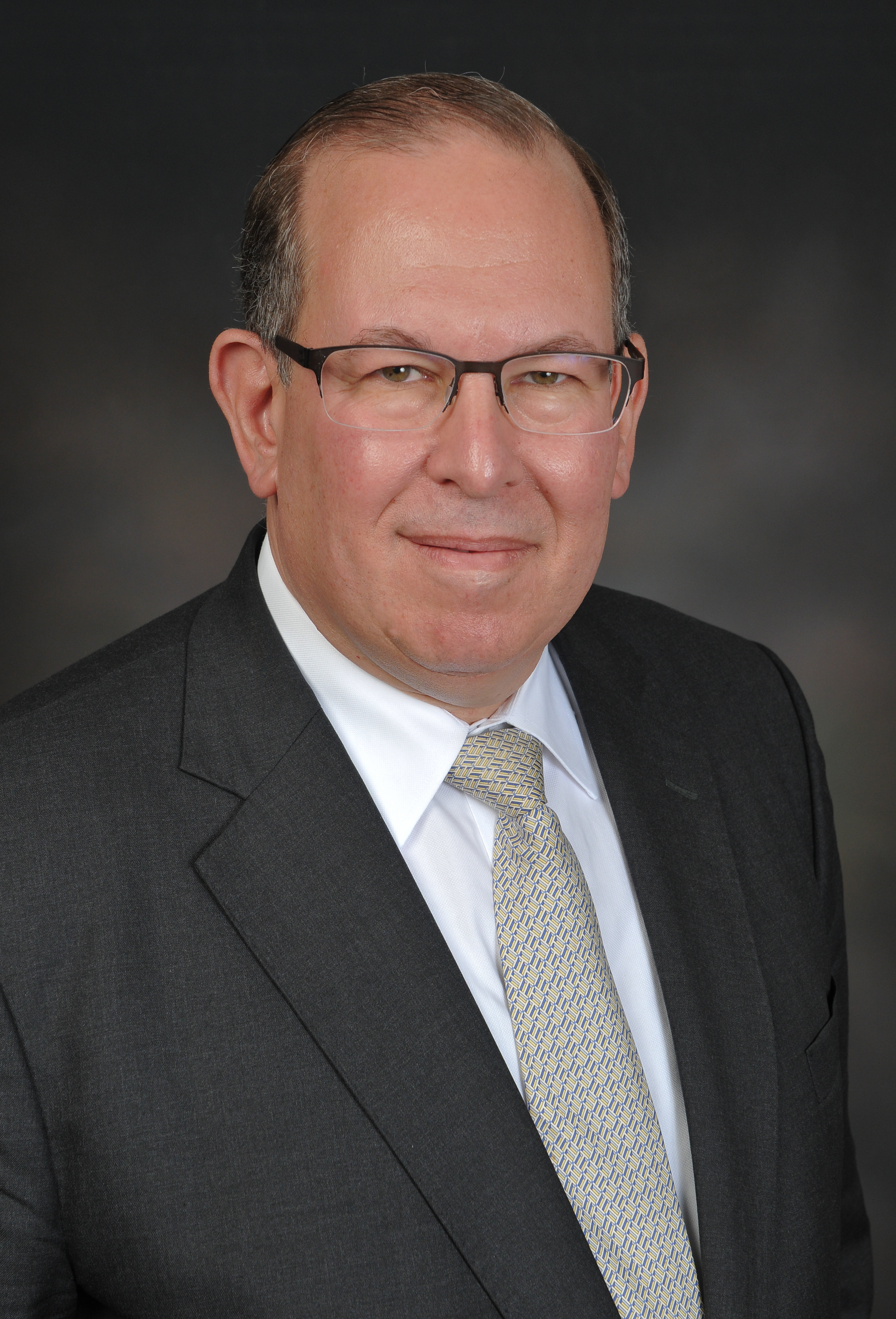
- Education: University of Pennsylvania
- Years active: 1982-present
- Employer: Westwood Capital
- Known for: U.S. Private Sector Job Quality Index

Daniel Alpert is an American investment banker, adjunct professor at Cornell Law School, commentator, and author. He is a co-creator of the United States Private Sector Job Quality Index, an economic metric that measures of higher wage versus lower wage private sector jobs, and the author of The Age of Oversupply: Confronting the Greatest Challenge to the Global Economy. Alpert is a founding partner of Westwood Capital LLC, an investment firm based in New York, and an adviser to the Coalition for a Prosperous America. Alpert is a member of the World Economic Roundtable.

== Biography ==
Alpert received a Bachelor of Arts degree in public policy from the University of Pennsylvania, and started working in commercial real estate banking and finance in 1982. He was a banker and partner at Oppenheimer & Co., Inc., before founding a New York-based investment firm, Westwood Capital, in 1995. During that time, Alpert worked on international merchant banking, bankruptcy-related restructuring transactions, commercial mortgage backed securities (CMBS) and mortgage REITs.

In 2010, Alpert was a featured commentator on the story of the 2008 financial crisis in the documentary film Inside Job. In January 2012, he was announced as a fellow of The Century Foundation.

In February 2018, Cornell Law School announced that Alpert would be a senior fellow in financial macroeconomics and an adjunct professor of law within the Clarke Program. He was also named to the advisory board of the Cornell Research Academy of Development, Law and Economics (CRADLE).

== Authorship ==
Following the 2008 financial crisis, Alpert became a cited author on economic policy and the credit bubble. He started writing for Business Insider in 2011. That same year, Alpert conceived of, and co-authored along with Nouriel Roubini, New York University Professor of Economics, and Robert Hockett, a Professor of Financial Law at Cornell University, a widely cited and debated white paper on behalf of the New America Foundation entitled The Way Forward that has been credited on most sides of the macroeconomic debate with providing a clear and concise explanation of the issues that led to the 2008 financial crisis. In 2013, he released The Age of Oversupply: Confronting the Greatest Challenge to the Global Economy on the effect of macroeconomic imbalances on advanced economies.

In 2016, he published the white paper GLUT: The U.S. Economy and the American Worker in the Age of Oversupply on the connection between global imbalances and United States employment, and co-authored The Debt Goes On: A Post-Crisis 'Progress' Report at Cornell. Alpert was a co-author of the U.S. Private Sector Job Quality Index in 2019.

== Selected publications ==
- Alpert, Daniel; Roubini, Nouriel; Hockett, Robert C. (October 10, 2011). "The Way Forward".
- Alpert, Daniel (September 2013). The Age of Oversupply: Overcoming the Greatest Challenge to the Global Economy. Penguin Portfolio. ISBN 978-1591845966.
- Alpert, Daniel (April 4, 2016). "GLUT: The U.S. Economy and the American Worker in the Age of Oversupply". Third Way.
- Alpert, Daniel; Hockett, Robert C. (September 13, 2016). "The Debt Goes On: A Post-Crisis 'Progress' Report". Cornell Legal Studies: 32. SSRN 2837929.
- Alpert, Daniel; Ferry, Jeff; Hockett, Robert C.; Khaleghiyan, Amir (April 8, 2020). "The U.S. Private Sector Job Quality Index". Cornell Legal Studies: 55. SSRN 3566575.
