= Robert Rogowsky =

Robert Rogowsky is a professor of International Policy, Development and Trade at the Middlebury Institute of International Studies at Monterey.

== Biography ==
Rogowsky is a professor and chair of the master's degree program in trade and economic diplomacy at the Middlebury Institute. He is also an adjunct professor at Georgetown University's School of Foreign Service and visiting professor, University of International Business and Economics in Beijing. He is president of the Institute for Trade & Commercial Diplomacy, an education-oriented non-profit institute in Arlington, Virginia.

Rogowsky was chief economist and director of operations at the United States International Trade Commission. He served on the President's Performance Improvement Council and on the board of the U.S. International Trade Data System. He also served as deputy director, Bureau of Consumer Protection of the Federal Trade Commission, as acting executive director to the Consumer Product Safety Commission, and as a litigation economist for the Bureau of Economics, FTC.

Rogowsky has taught International Trade Relations and International Strategic Management at George Mason University. He frequently lectures and consults on trade and development issues internationally. He received his master's degree and Ph.D. in economics from the University of Virginia. Rogowsky launched and edited the Journal of International Commerce and Economics.

== Published books ==
- Trade Liberalization: Fear and Facts, with Linda Linkins, and Karl Tsuji, Washington Papers, ISBN 978-0275974015
- "The Political Economy of Deregulation," edited with Bruce Yandle
- "Relevant Markets in Antitrust," edited with Ken Elzinga

== Education ==
Professor Rogowsky received his Ph.D. in economics in 1982 and his Master of Arts in economics in 1975 from the University of Virginia.
