= Analysis Group =

American consulting company

- Type: Private
- Industry: Economic consulting
- Founded: 1981; 45 years ago
- Headquarters: Boston, Massachusetts; 15 offices in North America, Europe, and Asia
- Key people: Pierre Cremieux, CEO; Martha Samuelson, Chairman
- Products: Expert services
- Number of employees: 1,500
- Website: www.analysisgroup.com

Analysis Group, Inc. (AG), founded in 1981 by economists Bruce E. Stangle and Michael F. Koehn, is an economic consulting firm with offices in the United States, Canada, and other international locations. It provides economic, financial, and strategic analysis and expert testimony to law firms, corporations, and government agencies.

== History ==
In 2005, Analysis Group provided testimony in the case of Alliance Capital Management. Ten years later, the consulting firm made Glassdoor’s 2015 list of the 50 Best Small and Medium Companies to Work For.

In 2019, the Boston Globe named Analysis Group on their annual Top Places to Work list.

=== 2020-present ===
In 2020 Analysis Group settled with the U.S. Department of Labor over allegations of hiring and compensation discrimination against minorities. Analysis Group agreed to pay $410,000 in backpay plus interest to the affected individuals.

In 2021, Analysis Group provided Judge Lasnik with economic analysis that was cited in determining attorney fees for a case that saw Hawaiian farmers accusing retailers of selling regular coffee under the name “Kona.”

In 2023, Analysis Group filed a lawsuit against Twitter, seeking $2.2 million in unpaid fees related to work performed during Elon Musk’s acquisition of the company. That same year, the company was named in the GCR 100 for outstanding economics and received the 2023 Prestige Ranking from Vault Consulting 50.

In January 2025, Pierre Cremieux, who had served as President of Analysis Group since 2016, succeeded Martha Samuelson as the firm’s Chief Executive Officer.

=== Litigation and expert testimony ===
Throughout the years, the firm has provided economic expertise and research gathered from independent studies for several high profile cases including The Federal Trade Commission v. The Kroger Company, Epic Games v. Apple, and US v. DaVita, Inc. and Kent Thiry.

In U.S. antitrust litigation involving Google, Judith Chevalier, an academic affiliate of Analysis Group, served as an expert witness and submitted a rebuttal report addressing elements of the plaintiffs’ economic research during class certification proceedings.

=== Internal expansion ===
In November 2025, Analysis Group formed a partnership with French consulting firm, Ricol Lasteyrie.

== Consulting activities ==
Analysis Group is described in industry coverage as an economics consulting and litigation-support firm. Its work includes economic and financial analysis, expert-witness support, health care consulting, policy analysis, and business strategy consulting. The firm's litigation-related work has included analytical support for expert opinions in commercial disputes. In 2023, Reuters reported that Analysis Group had provided analytical services and economic consulting assistance to law firms representing Twitter in litigation connected to Elon Musk's acquisition of the company.

== See also ==
- Berkeley Research Group
- Brattle Group
- Charles River Associates
- Compass Lexecon
- Cornerstone Research
- NERA Economic Consulting
