= CRA International =

American consultancy firm

CRA International, Inc.

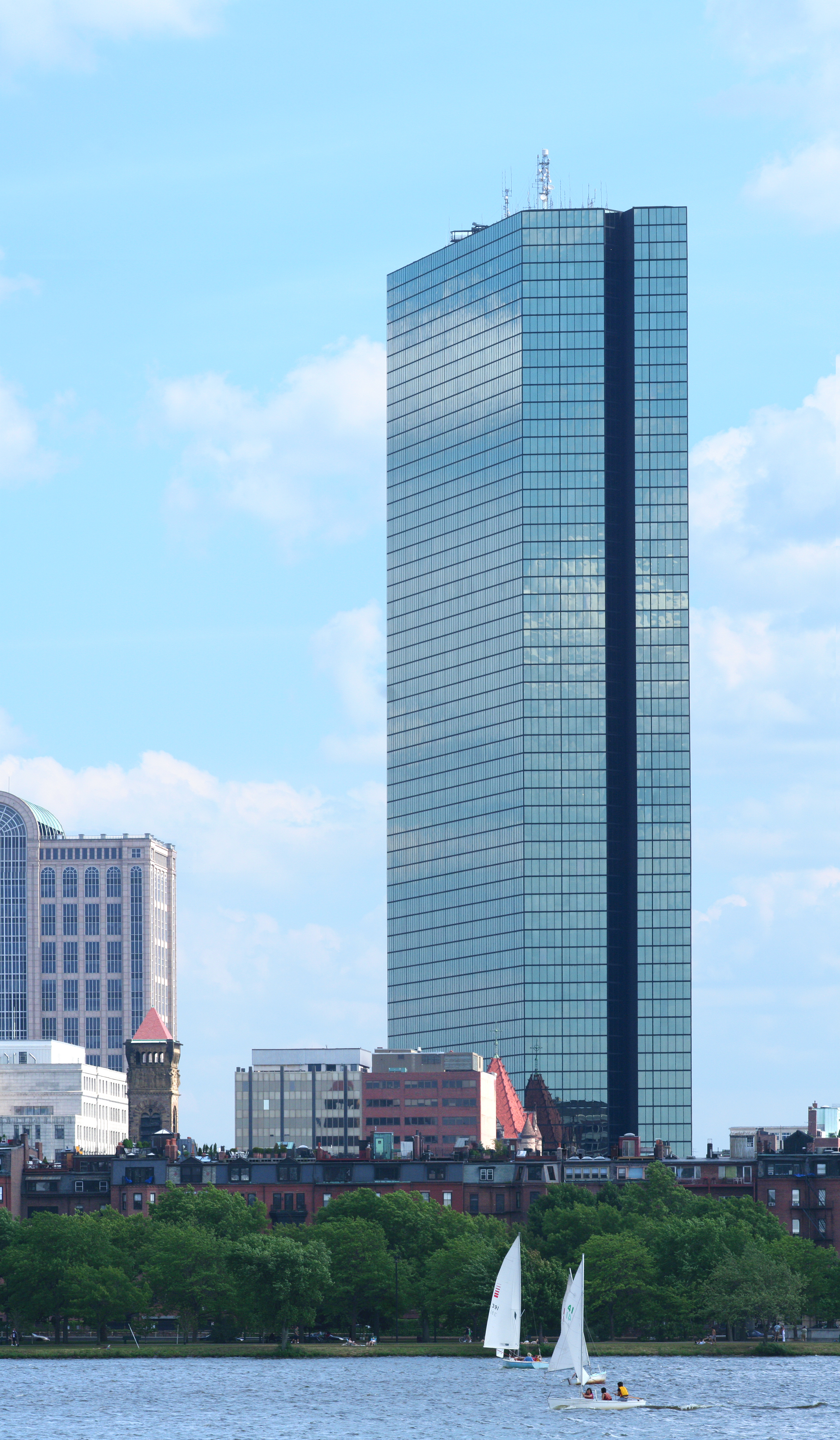
- Headquarters at John Hancock Tower
- Type: Public
- Traded as: Nasdaq: CRAI; Russell 2000 component
- Industry: Litigation; management consulting
- Founded: 1965; 61 years ago
- Founders: Jerry Kraft; John Kaler; Alan Willens
- Headquarters: John Hancock Tower; Boston, Massachusetts, U.S.
- Number of locations: 21 offices internationally
- Key people: Paul Maleh (president and CEO)
- Revenue: ▲US$591 million (2022)
- Net income: ▲US$43.6 million (2022)
- Total assets: ▼US$551 million (2022)
- Total equity: ▲US$211 million (2022)
- Number of employees: 939 (2022)
- Website: crai.com

CRA International, Inc. (doing business as Charles River Associates) is a global consulting firm headquartered in Boston. The firm provides expert testimony and litigation support, strategic advice, and analysis to law firms, corporations, accounting firms, and governments.

== Practice areas ==
Their practices include: antitrust & competition economics, auctions & competitive bidding, energy, finance, financial economics, forensic services, intellectual property, labor & employment, life sciences, management consulting (Marakon), risk investigations & analytics, and transfer pricing.

== History ==
CRA was founded in 1965 by Jerry Kraft, John Kaler, and Alan Willens. The company went public through an initial public offering in April 1998.

In 2005, CRA acquired economic consultancy firm Lexecon to expand its practice into Europe and the United Kingdom.

Marakon, which CRA acquired in 2009, forms part of their management consulting practice. Marakon Associates was founded in 1978 and pioneered value-based management (VBM) in the mid-1980s based on the academic work of Dr. Bill Alberts. This management principle, also known as managing for value (MFV), states that management should first and foremost consider the interests of shareholders when making management decisions. Under this principle, senior executives should set performance targets in terms of delivering shareholder returns (stock price and dividends payments) and managing to achieve them.

In 2017, CRA acquired life sciences strategy firm C1 Consulting. In 2022, CRA acquired life sciences firm bioStrategies Group and labor-focused firm Welch Consulting.

=== Economic forecasts used to oppose climate policymaking ===
Prior to the 1992 Earth Summit in Rio de Janeiro and the 1997 Kyoto summit (that led to the Kyoto Protocol), the fossil fuel industry used reports authored by CRA and funded by the fossil fuel industry to argue that US compliance with climate policy would be economically disastrous. CRA called the Clinton administration's projections for costs of compliance with the Kyoto Protocol wildly optimistic, and argued that compliance would take a "healthy whack out of the economy". CRA's work forecasting the impact on employment of the 2003 Climate Stewardship Act was criticized by the Natural Resources Defense Council in 2005 for using unrealistic economic assumptions and producing directionally incorrect estimates. According to a 2021 study, flawed economic forecasting reports written by four economists at Charles River Associates between 1991 and 2009, and paid for by fossil fuel interests, overestimated predicted costs and ignored potential policy benefits. The study argues that the reports written by CRA "played a key role in weakening, delaying, or defeating a wide range of climate policies".

== See also ==
- Analysis Group
- Berkeley Research Group
- Brattle Group
- Compass Lexecon
- Cornerstone Research
- NERA Economic Consulting
