= David Allan Cates =

American journalist (born 1956)

- Born: 1956 (age 69–70); Madison, Wisconsin, U.S.
- Education: University of Montana (MFA)
- Occupations: Author; Executive director of Missoula Medical Aid
- Spouse: Rosalie Cates
- Children: 3
- Awards: Multiple awards for his novels

David Allan Cates (born 1956) is an American novelist and poet, and the executive director of Missoula Medical Aid. His work has appeared in a number of publications, including The Sun, Outside Magazine, The Montanan, and The New York Times Sophisticated Traveler.

Cates has worked in a wide variety of jobs, however his focus is on writing, and he has received multiple awards in recognition of his work as an author.

He has a journalism degree and a Master's in Fine Arts from the University of Montana. He is married to his wife, Rosalie, and they have three daughters.

== Biography ==
=== Background and education ===
Cates was born in Madison, Wisconsin. His father, the late Richard Lyman Cates, was one of the lawyers on the House Judiciary Committee involved in the impeachment of President Richard Nixon during the Watergate scandal. His mother, the late Margaret "Marnie" (Lessig) Cates, worked at Oscar Mayer, while his father finished law school. His cousin is the lawyer and activist Lawrence Lessig.

Cates has degrees in journalism and fine arts, receiving his master's from the University of Montana, in Missoula. He played basketball during high school, and at the local YMCA, and made junior varsity, during his sophomore year at the university, but left the team during a period when he was struggling with what educational path he wanted to take.

He had written a paper in a Native American studies class that he was enrolled in, and found he enjoyed writing, deciding to take some journalism courses; he was 19 years old. His grades were poor, and he found himself feeling "inept," and, at the age of twenty, he decided to travel to Alaska, and to Africa with a friend. During his time traveling, he immersed himself in reading and as he described in an interview, in 2019, he "had a transformative experience in Africa."

Eventually, he returned to the university, where he got his degree, and married Rosalie. After receiving his degree, Cates and his wife moved to Costa Rica, where he wrote and played basketball again, in a professional league that he warned shouldn't "be confused with the NBA." It was there, where he began working on his novel, Hunger in America, but his book had been turned down by 30 publishers. His wife encouraged him to return to Missoula, and enroll in a graduate program in creative writing at the university. He finally published his book in 1992.

=== Career ===
Cates began working with Missoula Medical Aid in 1998, eventually becoming the executive director. The organizations' focus is on leading groups of medical professionals to provide health and surgery services in Honduras.

Cates has lectured at the University of Guanajuato, taught writing in a Mexican city prison, and classes on the short story in public high schools, including as a part-time faculty member of Pacific Lutheran University's MFA program.

He has worked as a professional basketball player in Costa Rica, a fishing guide on the Smith River and raised cattle on his family's farm in Wisconsin, and as a high school writing teacher.

Cates returned to the position as the executive director of Missoula Medical Aid in 2020. After stepping down from the position in 2017. However, according to an interview, in 2013, writing is his main focus. At the time of the interview, he was writing poetry. In 2016, he published The Mysterious Location of Kyrgyzstan, chapbook of poetry.

== Bibliography ==
A selection of Cates' books and other works is listed below.

- Valentine's Day in the Mummy Museum, Finishing Line Press, 2021.
- Imagining Tanya, Austin Macauley, 2021.
- The Mysterious Location of Kyrgyzstan, (a chapbook of poetry) Satellite Press, 2016.
- Tom Connor's Gift: mad grief, mad love, and a crooked road home, Bangtail Press, 2014.
- Ben Armstrong's Strange Trip Home: a novel, Novelas Americanas, 2012.
- Freeman Walker, Unbridled Books, 2008.
- X Out of Wonderland: a saga, Zoland Books, 2006.
- Hunger in America, Simon & Schuster, 1992.

== Awards and recognition ==
Cates' work as an author, has been recognized with several awards, as listed below.

- 1992 Hunger in America was named as a New York Times Notable Book
- 2005 Montana Book Award Honor Books for the novel, X Out Of Wonderland
- 2008 Montana Book Award Honor Books for the novel, Freeman Walker
- 2010 Winner in the Montana Arts Council's Artist Innovation Award in prose
- 2010 Rubber Boy, selected as a notable story in the Best American Short Stories Awards
- 2013 Gold Medal Independent Publisher Book Awards, Best Regional Fiction (west-mountain) for Ben Armstrong's Strange Trip Home
- 2015 Gold Medal Independent Publisher Book Awards, Best Regional Fiction (west-mountain) for Tom Connor's Gift
