= Libor scandal =

London banking fraud

Scale of the scandal

This dwarfs by orders of magnitude any financial scam in the history of markets.

— Andrew Lo, MIT Professor of Finance

The Libor scandal was a series of criminal allegations by financial authorities connected to the Libor (London Inter-bank Offered Rate) and the related Euribor benchmark, together with the resulting investigations and prosecutions. All ten convictions in the United States were overturned or vacated by 2022, after appellate courts held there was no evidence traders had broken any laws or rules. Eight of the nine convictions in England were quashed by 2026, leaving only the original "whistleblower" convicted out of the entire set of prosecutions. The Wall Street Journal in 2026 described the government allegations as a “persecution” and said politicians and prosecutors had sought scapegoats to distract from their own failures during the 2008 Great Recession. Senior British politicians John McDonnell and David Davis said it had been a miscarriage of justice and a hunt for scapegoats.

Libor is an average interest rate calculated through submissions of interest rates by major banks across the world. The scandal arose when it was discovered in 2012 that banks were inflating or deflating their rates so as to profit from trades, or to give the impression that they were more creditworthy than they were. Libor underpins approximately $350 trillion in derivatives. It was later administered by Intercontinental Exchange (ICE), which took over running the Libor in January 2014, though Libor was later phased out as a market benchmark. Some bank traders in the United States and Britain were convicted of fraud or conspiracy to defraud.

The banks were supposed to submit the actual interest rates they are paying, or would expect to pay, for unsecured borrowing from other banks; in fact little inter-bank borrowing took place on this basis and instead estimates had to be submitted. Libor was supposed to be the total assessment of the health of the financial system because if the banks being polled feel confident about the state of things, they report a low number and if the member banks feel a low degree of confidence in the financial system, they report a higher interest rate number. In June 2012, multiple criminal settlements by Barclays Bank revealed significant fraud and collusion by member banks connected to the rate submissions, leading to the scandal.

Because Libor was used in US derivatives markets, an attempt to manipulate Libor could have been an attempt to manipulate US derivatives markets, and thus a violation of American law. Since mortgages, student loans, financial derivatives, and other financial products often rely on Libor as a reference rate, the manipulation of submissions used to calculate those rates could have significant effects on consumers and financial markets worldwide.

On 27 July 2012, the Financial Times published an article by a former trader which stated that Libor manipulation had been common since at least 1991. Further reports on this have since come from the BBC and Reuters. On 28 November 2012, the Finance Committee of the Bundestag held a hearing to learn more about the issue.

The British Bankers' Association (BBA) said on 25 September 2012 that it would transfer oversight of Libor to UK regulators, as proposed by Financial Services Authority managing director Martin Wheatley's independent review recommendations. Wheatley's review recommended that banks submitting rates to Libor must base them on actual inter-bank deposit market transactions and keep records of those transactions, that individual banks' LIBOR submissions be published after three months, and recommended criminal sanctions specifically for manipulation of benchmark interest rates. Financial institution customers may experience higher and more volatile borrowing and hedging costs after implementation of the recommended reforms. The UK government agreed to accept all of the Wheatley Review's recommendations and press for legislation implementing them.

Significant reforms, in line with the Wheatley Review, came into effect in 2013 and a new administrator took over in early 2014. The UK controls Libor through laws made in the UK Parliament. In particular, the Financial Services Act 2012 brings Libor under UK regulatory oversight and creates a criminal offence for knowingly or deliberately making false or misleading statements relating to benchmark-setting.

As of November 2017, 13 traders had been charged by the UK Serious Fraud Office as part of their investigations into the Libor scandal. Of those, eight were acquitted in early 2016. Four were found guilty (Tom Hayes, Alex Pabon, Jay Vijay Merchant and Jonathan James Mathew), and one pleaded guilty (Peter Charles Johnson). The UK Serious Fraud Office closed its investigation into the rigging of Libor in October 2019 following a detailed review of the available evidence. It is estimated that the seven-year investigation of the Libor scandal in the UK cost at least £60 million.

BBC Radio 4 produced a programme, The Lowball Tapes, that questions whether the right people were convicted for rigging rates. The programme also alleges that at the height of the 2008 financial crisis, the Bank of England was giving instructions to banks to rig Libor to a much greater extent than the traders ever did on their own account. This was subsequently published as a book.

Following a series of related convictions of others in the United States for conspiracy for wire fraud and bank fraud, the US Court of Appeals for the Second Circuit in 2022 overturned the convictions of Matthew Connolly and Gavin Campbell Black on the grounds that the cases had not demonstrated that the Libor submissions were made with 'fraudulent intent'. This led to other similar convictions in the United States being overturned.

In the United Kingdom, the Supreme Court on 23 July 2025 allowed the appeals of Tom Hayes (originally convicted of conspiracy to defraud in 2015) and Carlo Palombo (2019), saying their convictions were unsafe because "It was wrong for the judge [Judge Anthony Leonard] to direct the jury that, if the submitter took any account of the commercial interests of the bank or a trader, the rate submitted was for that reason not a genuine or honest answer to the question posed by the [LIBOR or EURIBOR] definitions as a matter of law".

== Early reports ==
=== WSJ study ===
Libor manipulation to lower rate

Hi Guys, We got a big position in 3m libor for the next 3 days. Can we please keep the libor fixing at 5.39 for the next few days. It would really help. We do not want it to fix any higher than that. Tks a lot.

— Barclays Bank trader in New York to submitter,
13 September 2006

On 16 April 2008, The Wall Street Journal released an article, and later study, suggesting that some banks might have understated borrowing costs they reported for the Libor during the 2008 credit crunch that may have misled others about the financial position of these banks. In response, the BBA claimed that the Libor continued to be reliable even in times of financial crisis. Other authorities contradicted The Wall Street Journal article saying there was no evidence of manipulation. In its March 2008 Quarterly Review, the Bank for International Settlements stated that "available data do not support the hypothesis that contributor banks manipulated their quotes to profit from positions based on fixings." Further, in October 2008, the International Monetary Fund published its regular Global Financial Stability Review which also found that "Although the integrity of the U.S. dollar Libor-fixing process has been questioned by some market participants and the financial press, it appears that U.S. dollar Libor remains an accurate measure of a typical creditworthy bank's marginal cost of unsecured U.S. dollar term funding."

A study by economists Connan Snider and Thomas Youle, in April 2010 corroborated the results of the earlier Wall Street Journal study, concluding that the Libor submissions by some member banks were being understated. Unlike the earlier study, Snider and Youle suggested that the reason for understatement by member banks was not that the banks were trying to appear strong, especially during the 2008 financial crisis, but rather that the banks sought to make substantial profits on their large Libor interest-linked portfolios. For example, in the first quarter of 2009, Citigroup had interest rate swaps of notional value of $14.2 trillion, Bank of America had interest rate swaps of notional value of $49.7 trillion and JPMorgan Chase had interest rate swaps of notional value of $49.3 trillion. Given the large notional values, a small unhedged exposure to the Libor could generate large incentives to alter the overall Libor. In the first quarter of 2009, Citigroup for example reported that it would make that quarter $936 million in net interest revenue if interest rates would fall by .25 percentage points a quarter, and $1,935 million if they were to fall by 1 percentage point instantaneously.

=== Awareness of central banks ===
In November 2008, the Governor of the Bank of England, Mervyn King, told the UK Parliament that since the start of the 2008 financial crisis, "hardly anybody is willing to lend to any bank around the world for three months unsecured; they want to lend secured." As a result, he said that Libor had become "in many ways the rate at which banks do not lend to each other...it is not a rate at which anyone is actually borrowing."

The New York Federal Reserve chose to take no action against them at that time. Minutes by the Bank of England similarly indicated that the bank and its deputy governor Paul Tucker were also aware as early as November 2007 of industry concerns that the Libor rate was being under-reported. In one 2008 document, a Barclays employee told a New York Fed analyst, "We know that we're not posting an honest Libor, and yet we are doing it, because if we didn't do it, it draws unwanted attention on ourselves."

The documents show that in early 2008, a memo written by then New York Fed President Tim Geithner to Bank of England chief Mervyn King looked into ways to "fix" Libor. While the released memos suggest that the New York Fed helped to identify problems related to Libor and press the relevant authorities in the UK to reform, there is no documentation that shows any evidence that Geithner's recommendations were acted upon or that the Fed tried to make sure that they were. In October 2008, several months after Geithner's memo to King, a Barclays employee told a New York Fed representative that Libor rates were still "absolute rubbish."

=== Regulatory investigations ===
The Wall Street Journal reported in March 2011 that regulators were focusing on Bank of America Corp., Citigroup Inc. and UBS AG in their probe of Libor rate manipulation. A year later, it was reported in February 2012 that the US Department of Justice was conducting a criminal investigation into Libor abuse. Among the abuses being investigated were the possibility that traders were in direct communication with bankers before the rates were set, thus allowing them an unprecedented amount of insider knowledge into global instruments. In court documents, a trader from the Royal Bank of Scotland claimed that it was common practice among senior employees at his bank to make requests to the bank's rate setters as to the appropriate Libor rate, and that the bank also made on occasions rate requests for some hedge funds. One trader's messages from Barclays Bank indicated that for each basis point (0.01%) that Libor was moved, those involved could net, "about a couple of million dollars."

The Canadian Competition Bureau was reported on 15 July 2012 to also be carrying out an investigation into price fixing by five banks of the yen denominated Libor rates. Court documents filed indicated that the Competition Bureau had been pursuing the matter since at least January 2011. The documents offered a detailed view of how and when the international banks allegedly colluded to fix the Libor rates. The information was based on a whistleblower who traded immunity from prosecution in exchange for turning on his fellow conspirators. In the court documents, a federal prosecutor for the bureau stated, "IRD (interest-rate derivatives) traders at the participant banks communicated with each other their desire to see a higher or lower yen LIBOR to aid their trading positions." The alleged participants were the Canadian branches of the Royal Bank of Scotland, HSBC, Deutsche Bank, JP Morgan Bank, and Citibank, as well as ICAP (Intercapital), an interdealer broker.

== Breadth of scandal becomes apparent ==
By 4 July 2012, the breadth of the scandal was evident and became the topic of analysis on news and financial programs that attempted to explain the importance of the scandal. Two days later, it was announced that the UK Serious Fraud Office had also opened a criminal investigation into manipulation of interest rates. The investigation was not limited to Barclays. It has been reported since then that regulators in at least ten countries on three different continents are investigating the rigging of the Libor and other interest rates. Around 20 major banks have been named in investigations and court cases.

Early estimates are that the rate manipulation scandal cost US states, counties, and local governments at least $6 billion in fraudulent interest payments, above $4 billion that state and local governments have already had to spend to unwind their positions exposed to rate manipulation. An increasingly smaller set of banks are participating in setting the Libor, calling into question its future as a benchmark standard, but without any viable alternative to replace it.

=== United States investigations ===
The United States Congress began investigating on 10 July 2012. Senate Banking Committee Chairman Tim Johnson (D., South Dakota) said he would question Treasury Secretary Timothy Geithner and Federal Reserve chairman Ben Bernanke about the scandal during scheduled hearings. Rep. Randy Neugebauer (R., Texas) of the House Financial Services Committee, wrote New York Federal Reserve (New York Fed) President William Dudley. He was seeking records of communications between the New York Fed and Barclays between August 2007 and November 2009 related to Libor-like rates.

On 4 October 2012, Republican US Senators Chuck Grassley (Iowa) and Mark Kirk (Illinois) announced that they were investigating Treasury Secretary Tim Geithner for complicity with the rate manipulation scandal. They accused Geithner of knowledge of the rate-fixing, and inaction which contributed to litigation that "threatens to clog our courts with multi-billion dollar class action lawsuits" alleging that the manipulated rates harmed state, municipal and local governments. The senators said that an American-based interest rate index is a better alternative which they would take steps towards creating.

Timothy Lee, a capital markets expert at the Federal Housing Finance Agency Office of Inspector General, said in a 3 November memo that Fannie Mae and Freddie Mac may have lost more than $3 billion because of the manipulation.

=== Parliamentary investigation ===
Appearing before Parliament on 16 July, Jerry del Missier, a former senior Barclays executive, said that he had received instructions from Robert Diamond to lower rates after Diamond's discussions with bank regulators. He said that he had received information of a conversation between Diamond and Paul Tucker, deputy governor of the Bank of England, in which they had discussed the bank's financial position at the height of the 2008 financial crisis. It was his understanding that senior British government officials had instructed the bank to alter the rates. Del Missier's testimony followed statements from Diamond in which he denied that he had told his deputies to report false Libor rates. Speaking before Parliament the previous week, Tucker stated that he had shared concerns regarding Barclays Libor rates because the markets might view Barclays to be at risk if its Libor submissions continued to be higher than those of other international banks. In the midst of the Lehman Brothers collapse, there was concern the bank might need to be bailed out if the financial markets perceived it was a credit risk. Tucker told the committee, "I wanted to make sure that Barclays' day-to-day funding issues didn't push it over the cliff."

== Civil lawsuits ==
=== Cartel operation ===
Libor fixing a banking cartel

It's just amazing how Libor fixing can make you that much money or lose if opposite. It's a cartel now in London.

— RBS trader in Singapore to Deutsche Bank trader,
19 August 2007

In court documents filed in Singapore, Royal Bank of Scotland (RBS) trader Tan Chi Min told colleagues that his bank could move global interest rates and that the Libor fixing process in London had become a cartel. Tan in his court affidavit stated that the Royal Bank of Scotland knew of the Libor rates manipulation and that it supported such actions. In instant messages, traders at RBS extensively discussed manipulating Libor rates. In a released transcript of a 21 August 2007 chat, Jezri Mohideen, who was the head of yen products in Singapore, asked to have the Libor fixed in a conversation with other traders:

Mohideen: "What's the call on the Libor?"
Trader 2: "Where would you like it, Libor that is?"
Trader 3: "Mixed feelings, but mostly I'd like it all lower so the world starts to make a little sense."
Trader 4: "The whole HF [hedge fund] world will be kissing you instead of calling me if Libor move lower."
Trader 2: "OK, I will move the curve down 1 basis point, maybe more if I can."

In another conversation on 27 March 2008, Tan asked that RBS raise its Libor submission and noted that an earlier lower figure that the bank had submitted had cost his team £200,000. In other released instant chats, Tan made it clear that the Libor fixing process had become a highly lucrative money making cartel. Tan in a conversation with traders at other banks, including Deutsche Bank's Mark Wong said on 19 August 2007:

Tan: "It's just amazing how Libor fixing can make you that much money or lose if opposite. It's a cartel now in London."
Wong: "Must be damn difficult to trade man, especially [if] you [are] not in the loop."

=== Mortgage rate manipulation ===
Homeowners in the US filed a class action lawsuit in October 2012 against twelve of the largest banks which alleged that Libor manipulation made mortgage repayments more expensive than they should have been.

Statistical analysis indicated that the Libor rose consistently on the first day of each month between 2000 and 2009 on the day that most adjustable-rate mortgages had as a change date on which new repayment rates would "reset". An email referenced in the lawsuit from the Barclay's settlement, showed a trader asking for a higher Libor rate because "We're getting killed on our three-month resets." During the analysed period, the Libor rate rose on average more than two basis points above the average on the first day of the month, and between 2007 and 2009, the Libor rate rose on average more than seven and one-half basis points above the average on the first day of the month.

The five lead plaintiffs included a pensioner whose home was repossessed after her subprime mortgage was securitised into Libor-based collateralised debt obligations, sold by banks to investors, and foreclosed. The plaintiffs could number 100,000, each of whom has lost thousands of dollars. The complaint estimates that the banks earned hundreds of millions, if not billions of dollars, in wrongful profits as a result of artificially inflating Libor rates on the first day of each month during the complaint period.

=== Municipalities losses ===
The city of Baltimore and others in the US filed a class action lawsuit in April 2012 against Libor setting banks which alleged that the manipulation of Libor caused payments on their interest rate swaps to be smaller than they should have been. Before the 2008 financial crisis, states and localities bought $500 billion in interest rate swaps to hedge their municipal bond sales. It is estimated that the manipulation of Libor cost municipalities at least $6 billion. These losses were in addition to $4 billion that localities had already paid to unwind backfiring interest rate swaps.

Municipalities began using interest rate swaps to hedge their municipal bond sales in the late 1990s. At this time, investment bankers began offering local governments a way to save money on the sale of municipal bonds. The banks suggested instead of selling fixed interest rate bonds that local governments sell variable interest rate bonds which typically have interest rates as much as one percentage point lower than fixed interest rate bonds. For a municipal government this could mean saving as much as $1 million a year on the sale of a $100 million bond.

To hedge costs on the sale of variable interest rate bonds, which can rise and fall with the market, local governments, such as Baltimore, purchased interest rate swaps which exchange a variable interest rate for a fixed interest rate. In a swap deal, when the interest rate rises above the fixed interest rate, the swap seller pays the local government the increased cost on the bond, but when the interest rate falls under the fixed interest rate, the local government pays to the swap seller the decreased cost on the bond. The interest rate swap mechanism generally works well; however, between 2007 and 2010 the payments to local governments on their swaps artificially decreased but the cost on their bonds remained at actual market rates. This was because most interest rate swaps are linked to the Libor interest rate, while municipal bond rates are linked to the SIFMA Municipal Bond Index interest rate. During the 2008 financial crisis the two benchmark rates decoupled: the Libor rate decreased drastically from around 5.3% in 2007 to around 0.5% from 2009, while the SIFMA rate decreased to a lesser extent from around 3.5% in 2007 to below 2%. Municipalities continued to pay on their bonds at the actual market Sifma rate, but were liable to their interest rate swaps at the artificially lower Libor rate.

== Reactions ==
The cost to colluding and suspect banks from litigation, penalties, and loss of confidence may drive down finance industry profits for years. The cost of litigation from the scandal may exceed that of asbestos lawsuits.

=== United States ===
US experts such as former Assistant Secretary of the Treasury Paul Craig Roberts have argued that the Libor Scandal completes the picture of public and private financial institutions manipulating interest rates to prop up the prices of bonds and other fixed income instruments, and that "the motives of the Fed, Bank of England, US and UK banks are aligned, their policies mutually reinforcing and beneficial. The Libor fixing is another indication of this collusion." In that perspective they advocate stricter bank regulation, and a profound reform of the Federal Reserve System.

Former Citigroup chairman and CEO Sandy Weill, considered one of the driving forces behind the considerable financial deregulation and "mega-mergers" of the 1990s, surprised financial analysts in Europe and North America by calling for splitting up the commercial banks from the investment banks. In effect, he says, "Bring back the Glass-Steagall Act of 1933 which led to half a century, free of financial crises."

=== Europe ===
Mainland European scholars discussed the necessity of far-reaching banking reforms in light of the current crisis of confidence, recommending the adoption of binding regulations that would go further than the Dodd–Frank Act: notably in France where SFAF and World Pensions Council (WPC) banking experts have argued that, beyond national legislations, such rules should be adopted and implemented within the broader context of separation of powers in European Union law, to put an end to anti-competitive practices akin to exclusive dealing and limit conflicts of interest. This perspective gained ground after the unraveling of the Libor scandal, with mainstream opinion leaders such as the Financial Times' called for the adoption of an EU-wide "Glass–Steagall II."

=== Recommendations ===
The British Bankers' Association said on 25 September 2012 that it would transfer oversight of Libor to UK regulators, as proposed by Financial Services Authority managing director Martin Wheatley and CEO-designate of the new Financial Conduct Authority. On 28 September, Wheatley's independent review was published, recommending that an independent organisation with government and regulator representation, called the Tender Committee, manage the process of setting Libor under a new external oversight process for transparency and accountability. Banks that make submissions to Libor would be required to base them on actual inter-bank deposit market transactions and keep records of their transactions supporting those submissions. The review also recommended that individual banks' Libor submissions be published, but only after three months, to reduce the risk that they would be used as a measure of the submitting banks' creditworthiness. The review left open the possibility that regulators might compel additional banks to participate in submissions if an insufficient number do voluntarily. The review recommended criminal sanctions specifically for manipulation of benchmark interest rates such as the Libor, saying that existing criminal regulations for manipulation of financial instruments were inadequate. Libor rates could be higher and more volatile after implementation of the reforms, so financial institution customers may experience higher and more volatile borrowing and hedging costs. The UK government agreed to accept all of the Wheatley Review's recommendations and press for legislation implementing them.

Bloomberg LP CEO Dan Doctoroff told the European Parliament that Bloomberg LP could develop an alternative index called the Bloomberg Interbank Offered Rate that would use data from transactions such as market-based quotes for credit default swap transactions and corporate bonds.

=== Reforms ===
As of July 2013, the administration of Libor has itself become a regulated activity overseen by the UK's Financial Conduct Authority. Furthermore, knowingly or deliberately making false or misleading statements in relation to benchmark-setting had been made a criminal offence in UK law under the Financial Services Act 2012. The Danish, Swedish, Canadian, Australian and New Zealand Libor rates were terminated.

From the end of July 2013, only five currencies and seven maturities were to be quoted every day (35 rates), reduced from 150 different Libor rates – 15 maturities for each of ten currencies, making it more likely that the rates submitted are underpinned by real trades. During this time, it remained uncertain how the unwinding or restructuring or replacement of Libor would proceed.

Since the beginning of July 2013, each individual submission from the banks is embargoed for three months to reduce the motivation to submit a false rate to portray a flattering picture of creditworthiness.

As of July 2013, a new code of conduct, introduced by a new interim oversight committee, built on this by outlining the systems and controls firms need to have in place around Libor. For example, each bank must now have a named person responsible for Libor, accountable if there is any wrongdoing. The banks must keep records so that they can be audited by the regulators if necessary.

As of early 2014, NYSE Euronext has taken over the administration of Libor from the British Bankers Association. The new administrator is NYSE Euronext Rates Administration Limited, a London-based, UK registered company, regulated by the UK's Financial Conduct Authority.

=== Australia ===
As of June 2015, Australian regulators were still investigating involvement of Australian banks in manipulation of key market interest rates. The Australian Securities and Investments Commission (ASIC) described the Australia and New Zealand Banking Group as being "obstructionist" in its attitude towards this investigation. While the overall outcome of the investigation was still pending, one Australian man has been charged in relation to Libor. It was understood that ASIC was on the verge of launching legal action against ANZ. However, ANZ was not the only bank to have been caught up in the scandal with ASIC entering enforceable undertakings with BNP, Royal Bank of Scotland and UBS and imposed fines totalling $3.6 million.

== Fines ==
Libor manipulation to raise rate

Pls go for 5.36 libor again, very important that the setting comes as high as possible ... thanks.

— Barclays Bank trader in New York to submitter,
29 July 2007

On 27 June 2012, Barclays Bank was fined $200 million by the Commodity Futures Trading Commission, $160 million by the United States Department of Justice and £59.5 million by the Financial Services Authority for attempted manipulation of the Libor and Euribor rates. The United States Department of Justice and Barclays officially agreed that "the manipulation of the submissions affected the fixed rates on some occasions".

Barclays manipulated rates for at least two reasons. Routinely, from at least as early as 2005, traders sought particular rate submissions to benefit their financial positions. During the 2008 financial crisis, they artificially lowered rate submissions to make their bank seem healthy.

Following the interest rate rigging scandal, Marcus Agius, chairman of Barclays, resigned from his position. One day later, Bob Diamond, the chief executive officer of Barclays, also resigned from his position. Bob Diamond was subsequently questioned by the Parliament of the United Kingdom regarding the manipulation of Libor rates. He said he was unaware of the manipulation until that month, but mentioned discussions he had with Paul Tucker, deputy governor of the Bank of England. Tucker then voluntarily appeared before parliament, to clarify the discussions he had with Bob Diamond. He said he had never encouraged manipulation of the Libor, and that other self-regulated mechanisms like the Libor should be reformed.

On 19 December 2012, UBS agreed to pay regulators $1.5 billion ($1.2 billion to the US Department of Justice and the Commodity Futures Trading Commission, £160m to the UK Financial Services Authority and 59m CHF to the Swiss Financial Market Supervisory Authority) for its role in the scandal. The investigations revealed that UBS traders had colluded with other panel banks and had made over 2,000 written requests for movements in rates from at least January 2005 to at least June 2010 to benefit their trading positions. According to transcripts released by the UK's Financial Services Authority, UBS traders also offered financial inducements to interdealer brokers to help manipulate rates by spreading false information. In one exchange between a UBS banker identified as Trader A and an interdealer broker, the banker wrote,

if you keep 6s [i.e., the six-month JPY Libor rate] unchanged today ... I will fucking do one humongous deal with you ... Like a 50,000 buck deal, whatever ... I need you to keep it as low as possible ... if you do that .... I'll pay you, you know, 50,000 dollars, 100,000 dollars... whatever you want ... I'm a man of my word.

Subsequent trades between UBS and this broker generated more than $250,000 in fees to the broker.

US Assistant Attorney General Lanny Breuer described the conduct of UBS's as "simply astonishing" and declared the US would seek, as a criminal matter, the extradition of traders Thomas Alexander William Hayes and Roger Darin. The bank has stated that these and other fines would probably result in a significant fourth-quarter loss in 2012. The fine levied by the FSA, reduced due to the bank's co-operation, was the largest in the agency's history.

In September 2013, ICAP settled allegations that they had manipulated Libor. The United States Department of Justice charged three former employees, and ICAP paid $65 million to the US's Commodity Futures Trading Commission and £14 million ($22 million) to Britain's Financial Conduct Authority.

In October 2013, Rabobank was fined €774 million by US, UK and Dutch regulators .

In December 2013 the European Commission announced fines for six financial institutions participating in one or more bilateral cartels relating to Libor submissions for Japanese yen from 2007 to 2010. UBS received full immunity for revealing the existence of the cartels (due to Leniency policy) and thereby avoided a fine of around €2.5 billion for its participation in multiple infringements. Citigroup received full immunity for one of the infringements in which it participated, thereby avoiding a fine of around €55 million, but was fined €70 million for other infringements. The Royal Bank of Scotland was fined €260 million, Deutsche Bank €259 million, JPMorgan €80 million and broker RP Martin €247 thousand. In July 2014, US and UK regulators slapped a combined £218 million ($370 million) in fines on Lloyds and a number of subsidiaries over its part in the Libor fixing, and other rate manipulations and false reporting.

On 23 April 2015, Deutsche Bank agreed to a combined US$2.5 billion in fines – a US$2.175 billion fine by American regulators, and a €227 million penalty by British authorities – for its involvement in the Libor scandal. The company also pleaded guilty to wire fraud, acknowledging that at least 29 employees had engaged in illegal activity. It will be required to dismiss all employees who were involved with the fraudulent transactions. However, no individuals will be charged with criminal wrongdoing. In a Libor first, Deutsche Bank will be required to install an independent monitor. Commenting on the fine, Britain's Financial Conduct Authority director Georgina Philippou said "This case stands out for the seriousness and duration of the breaches ... One division at Deutsche Bank had a culture of generating profits without proper regard to the integrity of the market. This wasn't limited to a few individuals but, on certain desks, it appeared deeply ingrained." The fine represented a record for interest rate related cases, eclipsing a $1.5 billion Libor related fine to UBS, and the then-record $450 million fine assessed to Barclays earlier in the case. The size of the fine reflected the breadth of wrongdoing at Deutsche Bank, the bank's poor oversight of traders, and its failure to take action when it uncovered signs of abuse internally.

As of 2015, at least three banks – JPMorgan, Citigroup, and Bank of America – were still under investigation for their involvement in the fraud.

== See also ==
- 1992 Indian stock market scam
- Bank fraud
- Fideres
- Forex scandal, 2013
- Fraud
- NSE co-location scam
- Satyam scandal
- Secured Overnight Financing Rate
- White-collar crime
