= Tom Hayes (trader) =

Former trader for UBS and Citigroup

- Born: October 1979 (age 47); London, United Kingdom
- Other name: Thomas Alexander William Hayes
- Education: University of Nottingham; Hult International Business School
- Occupations: Trader, consultant
- Employer(s): UBS, Citigroup
- Known for: Libor Scandal
- Criminal charge: Participating in the Libor scandal
- Spouse: Sarah Tighe (Now divorced)

Tom Hayes (born October 1979) is a British former trader for UBS and Citigroup who was convicted of conspiring with others to manipulate the London Interbank Offered Rate (Libor) as part of the Libor scandal. He was sentenced to 14 years in prison - reduced to 11 years on appeal.

Although Hayes initially cooperated with the Serious Fraud Office, he maintained his innocence and claimed during his original trial that he participated in an “industry-wide” practice, accusing regulators of making him a scapegoat. He asserted managers were aware of his actions, and even condoned them. He made multiple unsuccessful appeals, including to the Criminal Case Review Commission.

In 2025, the Supreme Court finally overturned his conviction.

== Early life ==
Tom Alexander William Hayes was born in West London to Nicholas and Sandra Hayes, and initially grew up in Hammersmith. He moved with his mother to Winchester after his parents divorced, where he was raised by his mother, and Timothy, his stepfather. He attended The Westgate School, and, later, Peter Symonds College. A fellow student described him as an "incredibly smart geek".

After Peter Symonds, he attended the University of Nottingham, working in a restaurant kitchen during the summer holidays. He graduated with a degree in mathematics and engineering.

== Career and education ==
In 2001, after time as an intern at UBS, he joined Royal Bank of Scotland's trainee programme, at the interest rate derivatives desk. After working for Royal Bank of Scotland as a junior trader, he was headhunted by Royal Bank of Canada in 2004, and, upon moving there, he assumed greater responsibility. After two years at RBC, he moved to UBS in late 2006. Hayes was placed in the Tokyo office of UBS, where he began making trades involving the discrepancies between the Libor rate and Japanese interest rates.

Hayes turned down an offer from Goldman Sachs in 2008, but in 2009, accepted an offer from Citigroup; the bank gave him a $3 million signing bonus.

Hayes graduated with an MBA from Hult International Business School studying at the London campus. He met Jennifer Arcuri there and founded software company Title X Technology with her in 2012, using developers in Bulgaria.

== Manipulating LIBOR ==
Hayes traded derivatives at UBS and, later, Citigroup, in Tokyo. His favoured activity was basis trading, speculation on the movements in Libor expressed in multiple currencies and various durations, trades he might hedge with trades in other derivatives. The daily reporting of Libor rates by bankers around the world determined his success or failure in generating profits for his bank and bonuses for himself. By September 2008, a one basis point (1/100 of one per cent) move in Libor had about a US$750,000 effect on his bottom line. Through a network of his broker contacts, including one at the world's largest inter-dealer broker, ICAP, he succeeded in having Libor reported lower than its true level in order to drive his profits and personal bonuses higher.

In less than 9 months, in 2010, Hayes was fired by Citi for his Libor activities. In its letter dismissing the 35-year-old former trader, the bank wrote: "Citigroup has uncovered that you attempted to manipulate the Yen Libor and [the Tokyo equivalent] Tibor rates in order to benefit your trading position", which it said was a clear breach of its code of conduct, "resulting in the possibility of serious regulatory actions". After being fired, he moved back to England, where he day traded with his Citi bonus.

=== Arrest and trial ===
On 11 December 2012, Hayes was arrested by British authorities for his involvement in manipulating Libor rates, and on 19 December, he was charged by the United States for the same crime. In order to avoid extradition to and subsequent trial by and imprisonment in the U.S., Hayes initially cooperated with the Serious Fraud Office, providing eighty hours of interviews so as to be charged by the United Kingdom. After being charged, Hayes withdrew his offer of cooperation, intending instead to fight the charges levied by the SFO. In response, the SFO narrowed the scope of their charges, so leaving less overlap between charges by American and British prosecutors, creating the possibility of a second trial in the United States.

Hayes was diagnosed with a mild version Asperger syndrome before his trial and was accompanied by a court-appointed aide during the trial. Throughout the trial, prosecutors used Hayes' SFO interviews to establish his greed and corruption. The defence attempted to illustrate that manipulation of Libor was both widespread and expected as part of Hayes' job description, with senior management aware of the tactic.

=== Conviction ===
In August 2015, Hayes was sentenced to fourteen years in prison, to serve a minimum half of this sentence before being considered for early release. The judge, Jeremy Cooke, indicated he wished to "send a signal" to traders involved in illegal trading, as the sentence was significantly harsher than those given to other individuals convicted of financial crimes, such as Nick Leeson. Hayes maintained his innocence through the trial process, notwithstanding having stated during SFO interviews,

"Well look, I mean, it's a dishonest scheme, isn't it? And I was part of the dishonest scheme, so obviously I was being dishonest."

=== Appeal ===
Appeals by Hayes against conviction failed but his sentence was reduced by the Court of Appeal comprising Sir Brian Leveson, Elizabeth Gloster and John Thomas, Baron Thomas of Cwmgiedd to eleven years, under the same parole conditions.

Having exhausted all avenues of appeal, in May 2016, Hayes instructed solicitor Karen Todner to make an application for review by the Criminal Cases Review Commission (CCRC). In December 2021, the CCRC handed down a provisional judgement not to refer Hayes' case to the Court of Appeal.

In October 2022, the United States dismissed criminal charges against Hayes.

In July 2023 Hayes was finally referred by the CCRC back to the court of appeal in the U.K. following the Connolly and Black second circuit appeal court decision in the USA. In March 2024, the U.K. Court of Appeal upheld Hayes' conviction. Lord Justice Bean said there was “indisputable documentary evidence” Hayes had sought to move Libor.

=== Time in prison ===
In 2016, Hayes released letters concerning his time in prison. In them, he described being held separately from other prisoners, for his protection, in a "segregation unit". In 2019 he was moved to HM Prison Ford. Interviewed in "The Times" Hayes spoke of the struggles with his mental health and how becoming a Christian and the ministry of the church had helped him to survive.

On 29 January 2021, Hayes was released on licence from Ford open prison, having served half his sentence.

=== Conviction overturned ===
On 23 July 2025, his conviction was overturned by the Supreme Court, finding that he was denied a fair trial in 2015. The Court declared: “He was deprived of that opportunity by directions [given by the judge] which were legally inaccurate and unfair.

=== Lawsuit against UBS ===
On 27 October 2025, Hayes sued UBS for $400 million in alleged damages, claiming his activities were common practice in the bank and senior management was aware. The lawsuit alleges UBS's actions cost Hayes hundreds of millions in potential earnings, reputational damage, and emotional and physical trauma.

== Personal life ==
Hayes was married to Sarah Tighe, a corporate lawyer in London, with whom he has one child. They divorced in September 2019 during his imprisonment, although the couple remain on good terms and Tighe has campaigned for Hayes' conviction to be overturned.

At trial Hayes was diagnosed with mild Asperger syndrome. In March 2021, Hayes was also diagnosed with multiple sclerosis, which he stated was aggravated by his time in prison.
