= Leonard Waverman =

Dr. Leonard Waverman is dean of the DeGroote School of Business at McMaster University. He was formerly dean of the Haskayne School of Business at the University of Calgary.

With Lars Hendrik Röller, Dr. Waverman published the influential "Telecommunications Infrastructure and Economic Development" (The American Economic Review, September 2001). His analysis of the impacts of mobile phone rollout on economic growth in Africa was the cover page article of the March 12, 2005, issue of The Economist and a special report in 2009.
