= Richard Cates =

American politician and lawyer (1925–2011)

Richard Lyman Cates (November 22, 1925 – August 3, 2011) was an American Democratic politician and trial lawyer from Wisconsin.

== Background ==
Born in New York City, Cates served in the United States Marine Corps during World War II and the Korean War. Cates graduated from Dartmouth College and received his law degree from the University of Wisconsin Law School in 1951. Cates served as a Dane County, Wisconsin assistant district attorney. He then served in the Wisconsin State Assembly in 1959 and 1960 and later on the Madison, Wisconsin school board. In 1973, Cates served as one of the lawyers on the House Judiciary Committee inquiry concerning the potential impeachment of President Richard Nixon because of the Watergate scandal. Cates died in Madison at age 85.

== Family ==
At the time of his death, in 2011, Cates was survived by his wife, Margaret "Marnie" (Lessig) Cates, who died on July 9, 2013, and by his children, Richard Jr., John, Madison, David, Christine, and Robert. He had 18 grandchildren, two great grandchildren.

His nephew is the lawyer and activist Lawrence Lessig. His granddaughter is technology entrepreneur Jennifer Arcuri. His son, David Allan Cates is an author and the executive director of Missoula Medical Aid.
