= Greenlining Institute =

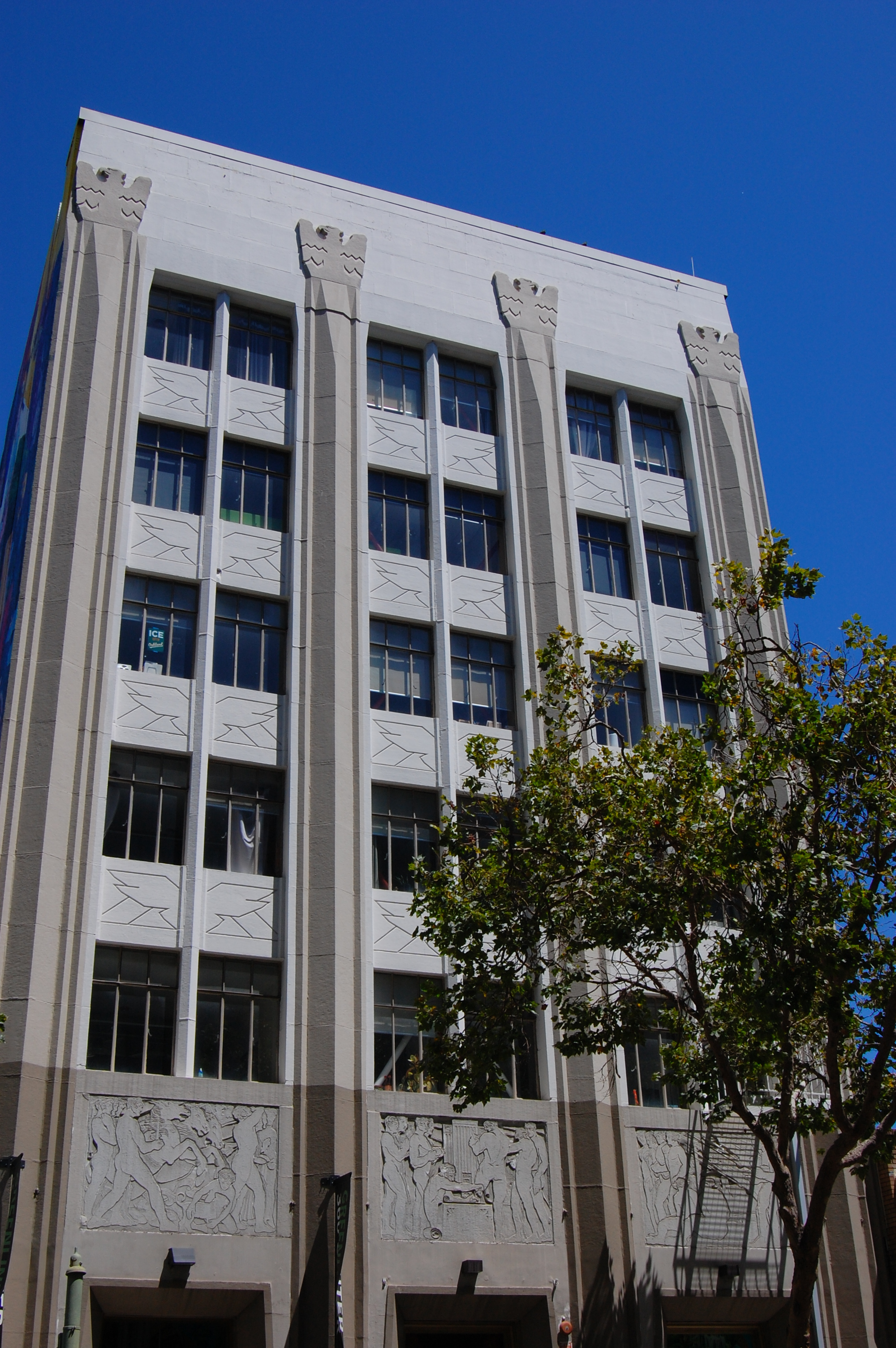

The Greenlining Institute is a public policy, research, and advocacy non-profit organization based in Oakland, California. It seeks to advance economic opportunity and empowerment for people of color through advocacy, community and coalition building, research and leadership development.

== History ==
The Greenlining Institute was established by African American, Asian American, and Latino American community leaders in 1993 to fight injustice, increase the participation of people of color in policymaking, and encourage successful investment by corporate America into these communities. Rather than just fighting redlining, the illegal practice of denying services to certain communities, greenlining is the proactive effort of bringing profitable investments and services to communities that have been left behind.

The Greenlining Institute was founded on the principle of wealth creation, with a strong belief that diversity makes business sense and leads to greater effectiveness.

== Policy Issues ==
=== Philanthropy-related activities ===
In 2005, Greenlining began researching the philanthropic giving patterns of California's largest foundations and found very low investment in non-profit organizations led by people of color.

According to the US Census, California's communities of color comprise over 50% of the state's population—making it a majority-minority state. Greenlining found that philanthropic giving did not reflect California's population.

Greenlining introduced AB 624, which was a piece of "sunshine" legislation which would have require large foundations operating in California to gather and disclose pertinent diversity data. AB 624 would not have required foundations to invest in minority communities, nor would it have created racial quotas for grant-making and employment. This legislation was an attempt to get foundations to disclose data related to diversity on an annual basis. The bill was ultimately withdrawn.

=== Opposition to Uber ===
The Greenlining Institute opposed the expansion of Uber into Oakland, California due to concerns that it would cause displacement of residents and gentrification.

=== Community reinvestment ===
Greenlining's Community Reinvestment program works with banks and other financial institutions to equitably execute the Community Reinvestment Act.
