= Economic consulting =

Analysis in a litigation environment

Economic consulting is the practice of providing advanced economic, financial, and statistical analysis for use in litigation, regulatory, and commercial environments. Law firms, state institutions, and other organizations may rely on economic consultants to produce research, analyses, reports, and testimony to be used in trial. Economic consulting also deals with various matters that require data-intensive analyses, such as macroeconomics research, program evaluation, policymaking, and commercial strategies. Economic consultants are typically required to possess knowledge of statistics, econometrics, and computer programming, given the data-oriented nature of economic consulting case work.

Economic consulting consists of providing economic expertise in a variety of areas, including but not limited to antitrust; valuation; bankruptcy; energy; finance; healthcare; insurance; intellectual property; labor and employment; life sciences; cybersecurity; media and entertainment; and securities. Economic consulting firms often provide the support team when a client hires a law firm or economic expert. The expert—typically a professor or a senior member of an economic consulting firm—will provide economic consulting by, for example, analyzing competitive effects, calculating damages, and testifying to one's expert opinion before a judge, jury, arbiter, or government enforcement agency.

== History ==
Economic consulting began growing in the United States when, in 1936, the Department of Justice (DOJ) began employing economists to assist with its investigations and litigations of mergers and anti-competitive behavior. Economic consulting firms began providing assistance to the companies being investigated and being sued by government agencies and their economists, and they soon began providing assistance to government agencies as well.

By the turn of the 21st century, economic consultancies had gained prominence, and their reports were often part of the court record and the basis for the court's opinions. In the late 1990s, the DOJ, direct action plaintiffs, and class action plaintiffs sued an international cartel of vitamin manufacturers, accusing them of conspiring to inflate prices in what became the largest price-fixing case in US history at that time. In the class certification phase, the judge's opinion cited evidence from both plaintiff and defendant economic experts regarding common impact of damages, price trends, and the structure of the vitamins industry. This case was the first successful US prosecution of an international cartel. Within a few years, even the Supreme Court was considering economic consulting work products to decide its cases.

== Function ==
Economic consulting services are generally divided into four types of services: conducting research; performing statistical and empirical economic analysis; responding to the opposing expert's work; and preparing an expert report and supporting the expert during trial. Consultants often begin by conducting research: they review materials provided in discovery, depositions, news articles, industry reports, and economic literature to gain industry knowledge and identify relevant information like the structure of the industry (e.g., competitors, relevant market size, competing products) and available data. This work may occur at the beginning of litigation or in a consulting or pre-litigation phase.

Consultants perform empirical analysis, often developing complex regression models to determine factors such as the impact of a proposed merger or price increases due to anticompetitive behavior. Consultants further review the work of the other party in litigation, analyzing the validity of the opposing expert's economic theory and analysis and often summarizing their expert's work and opinions in an expert report. Finally, if the case goes to trial, consultants support the expert during trial.

== Criticism ==
Economic consultants are sometimes accused of using “junk science” to help their clients. In a 2016 speech, former Deputy Assistant Attorney General David Gelfand stated that economic consultancies often help him understand the complex economic issues underlying his cases. However, Gelfand also observed that some economic consulting presentations and reports rely on p-hacking (misusing data analysis to find patterns in data that can be presented as statistically significant) or misrepresent the evidence to support their client's goals.

A 2016 ProPublica article noted that economic consulting is a million-dollar industry, with top economic experts billing at over $1,000 an hour. Yet the experts’ reports are often confidential—meaning the public cannot scrutinize them—and their predictions often do not prove true. The article's authors credit the economic consulting industry with the decline in merger enforcement and the rise in market concentration. Additional scrutiny has occurred when economic consulting firms have been found to be working on both sides of the same case.

== See also ==
- History of United States antitrust law
- Lysine price-fixing conspiracy
- Ohio v. American Express Co.
- United States Department of Justice Antitrust Division
