= Brattle Group =

Consulting firm

The Brattle Group
- Company type: Private company
- Industry: Economic consulting
- Founded: 1990; 36 years ago
- Headquarters: Boston, Massachusetts, U.S.
- Number of locations: 11 offices (2019)
- Services: Consulting and expert testimony
- Number of employees: Over 350 (2019)
- Website: www.brattle.com

The Brattle Group provides consulting services and expert testimony in economics, finance, and regulation to corporations, law firms, and public agencies. As of 2019, the company had offices in Boston, Brussels, Chicago, London, Madrid, New York City, Rome, San Francisco, Sydney, Toronto, and Washington, DC. Headquartered in Boston since 2017, its original headquarters was located on Brattle Street, in the Harvard Square district of Cambridge.

An example of its work is the report presented in June 2023 at an event at the University of the West Indies in which reparations for slavery were estimated for the harms done both during and after the period of transatlantic chattel slavery at more than 100 trillion dollars.

== Brattle Prize in Corporate Finance ==
The company presents the Brattle Prize each year at the American Finance Association's annual meeting. It is awarded for outstanding papers on corporate finance, published in the Journal of Finance.

== Consultants ==
- Daniel McFadden
- Stewart Myers
- George S. Oldfield
