= List of current United States circuit judges =

Map of the geographic boundaries of the various United States courts of appeals and United States district courts

This is a list of the judges of the United States courts of appeals. The United States Courts of Appeals or circuit courts are the intermediate appellate courts of the United States federal court system. The list includes both "active" and "senior" judges, both of whom hear and decide cases.

Of the thirteen US courts of appeals, twelve are divided into geographical jurisdictions. Of those twelve, eleven are designated numerically, while the other is the District of Columbia Circuit. The thirteenth is the United States Court of Appeals for the Federal Circuit which has nationwide jurisdiction over appeals of certain, specific subject matter, for example, patent law.

Congress has authorized 179 judgeships, though the total number of judges will be higher than 179 because of some judges electing senior status. Only active, non-senior-status judges may fill one of the 179 authorized judgeships. As of November 15, 2025, there are zero nominations awaiting Senate action along with one future vacancy.

Per the practice of visiting judges, sometimes appeals courts cases are heard and decided by active, senior, or retired judges from the US district courts, US courts of appeals, or US Supreme Court, for cases either within or outside of their assigned geographical jurisdiction. While some judges with senior status are inactive, these judges are not yet retired and may return to actively hearing cases at any time.

== Judges of the First Circuit ==
As of November 7, 2025:

#	Title	Judge	Duty station	Born	Term of service			Appointed by
#	Title	Judge	Duty station	Born	Active	Chief	Senior	Appointed by
32	Chief Judge	David J. Barron	Boston, MA	1967	2014–present	2022–present	—	Obama
33	Circuit Judge	Gustavo Gelpí	San Juan, PR	1965	2021–present	—	—	Biden
34	Circuit Judge	Lara Montecalvo	Providence, RI	1974	2022–present	—	—	Biden
35	Circuit Judge	Julie Rikelman	Boston, MA	1972	2023–present	—	—	Biden
36	Circuit Judge	Seth Aframe	Concord, NH	1974	2024–present	—	—	Biden
37	Circuit Judge	Joshua Dunlap	Portland, ME	1983	2025–present	—	—	Trump
18	Senior Circuit Judge	Levin H. Campbell	inactive	1927	1972–1992	1983–1990	1992–present	Nixon
27	Senior Circuit Judge	Sandra Lynch	Boston, MA	1946	1995–2022	2008–2015	2022–present	Clinton
28	Senior Circuit Judge	Kermit Lipez	Portland, ME	1941	1998–2011	—	2011–present	Clinton
29	Senior Circuit Judge	Jeffrey R. Howard	Concord, NH	1955	2002–2022	2015–2022	2022–present	G.W. Bush
30	Senior Circuit Judge	O. Rogeriee Thompson	Providence, RI	1951	2010–2022	—	2022–present	Obama
31	Senior Circuit Judge	William J. Kayatta Jr.	Portland, ME	1953	2013–2024	—	2024–present	Obama

== Judges of the Second Circuit ==
As of July 13, 2024:

#	Title	Judge	Duty station	Born	Term of service			Appointed by
#	Title	Judge	Duty station	Born	Active	Chief	Senior	Appointed by
66	Chief Judge	Debra Ann Livingston	New York, NY	1959	2007–present	2020–present	—	G.W. Bush
69	Circuit Judge	Raymond Lohier	New York, NY	1965	2010–present	—	—	Obama
72	Circuit Judge	Richard J. Sullivan	New York, NY	1964	2018–present	—	—	Trump
73	Circuit Judge	Joseph F. Bianco	Central Islip, NY	1966	2019–present	—	—	Trump
74	Circuit Judge	Michael H. Park	New York, NY	1976	2019–present	—	—	Trump
75	Circuit Judge	William J. Nardini	New Haven, CT	1969	2019–present	—	—	Trump
76	Circuit Judge	Steven Menashi	New York, NY	1979	2019–present	—	—	Trump
77	Circuit Judge	Eunice C. Lee	New York, NY	1970	2021–present	—	—	Biden
78	Circuit Judge	Beth Robinson	Burlington, VT	1965	2021–present	—	—	Biden
79	Circuit Judge	Myrna Pérez	New York, NY	1974	2021–present	—	—	Biden
80	Circuit Judge	Alison Nathan	New York, NY	1972	2022–present	—	—	Biden
81	Circuit Judge	Sarah A. L. Merriam	Bridgeport, CT	1971	2022–present	—	—	Biden
82	Circuit Judge	Maria Araújo Kahn	New Haven, CT	1964	2023–present	—	—	Biden
41	Senior Circuit Judge	Jon O. Newman	Hartford, CT	1932	1979–1997	1993–1997	1997–present	Carter
42	Senior Circuit Judge	Amalya Kearse	New York, NY	1937	1979–2002	—	2002–present	Carter
50	Senior Circuit Judge	John M. Walker Jr.	New Haven, CT	1940	1989–2006	2000–2006	2006–present	G.H.W. Bush
52	Senior Circuit Judge	Dennis Jacobs	New York, NY	1944	1992–2019	2006–2013	2019–present	G.H.W. Bush
53	Senior Circuit Judge	Pierre N. Leval	New York, NY	1936	1993–2002	—	2002–present	Clinton
54	Senior Circuit Judge	Guido Calabresi	New Haven, CT	1932	1994–2009	—	2009–present	Clinton
55	Senior Circuit Judge	José A. Cabranes	New Haven, CT	1940	1994–2023	—	2023–present	Clinton
59	Senior Circuit Judge	Robert D. Sack	New York, NY	1939	1998–2009	—	2009–present	Clinton
62	Senior Circuit Judge	Barrington D. Parker Jr.	New York, NY	1944	2001–2009	—	2009–present	G.W. Bush
63	Senior Circuit Judge	Reena Raggi	Brooklyn, NY	1951	2002–2018	—	2018–present	G.W. Bush
64	Senior Circuit Judge	Richard C. Wesley	Geneseo, NY	1949	2003–2016	—	2016–present	G.W. Bush
67	Senior Circuit Judge	Gerard E. Lynch	New York, NY	1951	2009–2016	—	2016–present	Obama
68	Senior Circuit Judge	Denny Chin	New York, NY	1954	2010–2021	—	2021–present	Obama
70	Senior Circuit Judge	Susan L. Carney	New Haven, CT	1951	2011–2022	—	2022–present	Obama

== Judges of the Third Circuit ==
As of October 9, 2025:

#	Title	Judge	Duty station	Born	Term of service			Appointed by
#	Title	Judge	Duty station	Born	Active	Chief	Senior	Appointed by
61	Chief Judge	Michael Chagares	Newark, NJ	1962	2006–present	2021–present	—	G.W. Bush
63	Circuit Judge	Thomas Hardiman	Pittsburgh, PA	1965	2007–present	—	—	G.W. Bush
66	Circuit Judge	Patty Shwartz	Newark, NJ	1961	2013–present	—	—	Obama
67	Circuit Judge	Cheryl Ann Krause	Philadelphia, PA	1968	2014–present	—	—	Obama
68	Circuit Judge	L. Felipe Restrepo	Philadelphia, PA	1959	2016–present	—	—	Obama
69	Circuit Judge	Stephanos Bibas	Philadelphia, PA	1969	2017–present	—	—	Trump
70	Circuit Judge	David J. Porter	Pittsburgh, PA	1966	2018–present	—	—	Trump
71	Circuit Judge	Paul Matey	Newark, NJ	1971	2019–present	—	—	Trump
72	Circuit Judge	Peter J. Phipps	Pittsburgh, PA	1973	2019–present	—	—	Trump
73	Circuit Judge	Arianna J. Freeman	Philadelphia, PA	1978	2022–present	—	—	Biden
74	Circuit Judge	Tamika Montgomery-Reeves	Wilmington, DE	1981	2023–present	—	—	Biden
75	Circuit Judge	Cindy K. Chung	Pittsburgh, PA	1975	2023–present	—	—	Biden
76	Circuit Judge	Emil Bove	Newark, NJ	1981	2025–present	—	—	Trump
77	Circuit Judge	Jennifer Mascott	Wilmington, DE	1976	2025–present	—	—	Trump
45	Senior Circuit Judge	Anthony Joseph Scirica	Philadelphia, PA	1940	1987–2013	2003–2010	2013–present	Reagan
46	Senior Circuit Judge	Robert Cowen	inactive	1930	1987–1998	—	1998–present	Reagan
47	Senior Circuit Judge	Richard Lowell Nygaard	Erie, PA	1940	1988–2005	—	2005–present	Reagan
49	Senior Circuit Judge	Jane Richards Roth	Wilmington, DE	1935	1991–2006	—	2006–present	G.H.W. Bush
51	Senior Circuit Judge	Theodore McKee	Philadelphia, PA	1947	1994–2022	2010–2016	2022–present	Clinton
53	Senior Circuit Judge	Marjorie Rendell	Philadelphia, PA	1947	1997–2015	—	2015–present	Clinton
55	Senior Circuit Judge	Thomas L. Ambro	Wilmington, DE	1949	2000–2023	—	2023–present	Clinton
56	Senior Circuit Judge	Julio M. Fuentes	Newark, NJ	1946	2000–2016	—	2016–present	Clinton
57	Senior Circuit Judge	D. Brooks Smith	Duncansville, PA	1951	2002–2021	2016–2021	2021–present	G.W. Bush
59	Senior Circuit Judge	D. Michael Fisher	Pittsburgh, PA	1944	2003–2017	—	2017–present	G.W. Bush

== Judges of the Fourth Circuit ==
As of March 19, 2024:

#	Title	Judge	Duty station	Born	Term of service			Appointed by
#	Title	Judge	Duty station	Born	Active	Chief	Senior	Appointed by
48	Chief Judge	Albert Diaz	Charlotte, NC	1960	2010–present	2023–present	—	Obama
30	Circuit Judge	J. Harvie Wilkinson III	Charlottesville, VA	1944	1984–present	1996–2003	—	Reagan
33	Circuit Judge	Paul V. Niemeyer	Baltimore, MD	1941	1990–present	—	—	G.H.W. Bush
40	Circuit Judge	Robert Bruce King	Charleston, WV	1940	1998–present	—	—	Clinton
41	Circuit Judge	Roger Gregory	Richmond, VA	1953	2000–present	2016–2023	—	Clinton / G.W. Bush (Note: Recess appointment by Bill Clinton on December 27, 2000, re-nominated by George W. Bush on May 9, 2001 and confirmed by the United States Senate on July 20, 2001.)
44	Circuit Judge	G. Steven Agee	Salem, VA	1952	2008–present	—	—	G.W. Bush
47	Circuit Judge	James Andrew Wynn	Raleigh, NC	1954	2010–present	—	—	Obama
50	Circuit Judge	Stephanie Thacker	Charleston, WV	1965	2012–present	—	—	Obama
51	Circuit Judge	Pamela Harris	Bethesda, MD	1962	2014–present	—	—	Obama
52	Circuit Judge	Julius N. Richardson	Columbia, SC	1976	2018–present	—	—	Trump
53	Circuit Judge	A. Marvin Quattlebaum Jr.	Greenville, SC	1964	2018–present	—	—	Trump
54	Circuit Judge	Allison Jones Rushing	Asheville, NC	1982	2019–present	—	—	Trump
55	Circuit Judge	Toby J. Heytens	Alexandria, VA	1975	2021–present	—	—	Biden
56	Circuit Judge	DeAndrea G. Benjamin	Columbia, SC	1972	2023–present	—	—	Biden
57	Circuit Judge	Nicole Berner	Baltimore, MD	1965	2024–present	—	—	Biden
38	Senior Circuit Judge	Diana Gribbon Motz	inactive	1943	1994–2022	—	2022–present	Clinton
39	Senior Circuit Judge	William Byrd Traxler Jr.	Greenville, SC	1948	1998–2018	2009–2016	2018–present	Clinton
46	Senior Circuit Judge	Barbara Milano Keenan	Alexandria, VA	1950	2010–2021	—	2021–present	Obama
49	Senior Circuit Judge	Henry F. Floyd	Spartanburg, SC	1947	2011–2021	—	2021–present	Obama

== Judges of the Fifth Circuit ==
As of May 16, 2025:

#	Title	Judge	Duty station	Born	Term of service			Appointed by
#	Title	Judge	Duty station	Born	Active	Chief	Senior	Appointed by
78	Chief Judge	Jennifer Walker Elrod	Houston, TX	1966	2007–present	2024–present	—	G.W. Bush
63	Circuit Judge	Edith Jones	Houston, TX	1949	1985–present	2006–2012	—	Reagan
64	Circuit Judge	Jerry Edwin Smith	Houston, TX	1946	1987–present	—	—	Reagan
71	Circuit Judge	Carl E. Stewart	Shreveport, LA	1950	1994–present	2012–2019	—	Clinton
77	Circuit Judge	Priscilla Richman	Austin, TX	1954	2005–present	2019–2024	—	G.W. Bush
79	Circuit Judge	Leslie H. Southwick	Jackson, MS	1950	2007–present	—	—	G.W. Bush
80	Circuit Judge	Catharina Haynes	Dallas, TX	1963	2008–present	—	—	G.W. Bush
81	Circuit Judge	James E. Graves Jr.	Jackson, MS	1953	2011–present	—	—	Obama
82	Circuit Judge	Stephen A. Higginson	New Orleans, LA	1961	2011–present	—	—	Obama
84	Circuit Judge	Don Willett	Austin, TX	1966	2018–present	—	—	Trump
85	Circuit Judge	James C. Ho	Dallas, TX	1973	2018–present	—	—	Trump
86	Circuit Judge	Kyle Duncan	Baton Rouge, LA	1972	2018–present	—	—	Trump
87	Circuit Judge	Kurt D. Engelhardt	New Orleans, LA	1960	2018–present	—	—	Trump
88	Circuit Judge	Andrew Oldham	Austin, TX	1978	2018–present	—	—	Trump
89	Circuit Judge	Cory T. Wilson	Jackson, MS	1970	2020–present	—	—	Trump
90	Circuit Judge	Dana Douglas	New Orleans, LA	1975	2022–present	—	—	Biden
91	Circuit Judge	Irma Carrillo Ramirez	Dallas, TX	1964	2023–present	—	—	Biden
51	Senior Circuit Judge	Carolyn Dineen King	Houston, TX	1938	1979–2013	1999–2006	2013–present	Carter
59	Senior Circuit Judge	E. Grady Jolly	Jackson, MS	1937	1982–2017	—	2017–present	Reagan
60	Senior Circuit Judge	Patrick Higginbotham	San Antonio, TX	1938	1982–2006	—	2006–present	Reagan
61	Senior Circuit Judge	W. Eugene Davis	New Orleans, LA	1936	1983–2016	—	2016–present	Reagan
66	Senior Circuit Judge	Jacques L. Wiener Jr.	New Orleans, LA	1934	1990–2010	—	2010–present	G.H.W. Bush
67	Senior Circuit Judge	Rhesa Barksdale	Jackson, MS	1944	1990–2009	—	2009–present	G.H.W. Bush
73	Senior Circuit Judge	James L. Dennis	New Orleans, LA	1936	1995–2022	—	2022–present	Clinton
74	Senior Circuit Judge	Edith Brown Clement	New Orleans, LA	1948	2001–2018	—	2018–present	G.W. Bush

== Judges of the Sixth Circuit ==
As of July 17, 2025:

#	Title	Judge	Duty station	Born	Term of service			Appointed by
#	Title	Judge	Duty station	Born	Active	Chief	Senior	Appointed by
62	Chief Judge	Jeffrey Sutton	Columbus, OH	1960	2003–present	2021–present	—	G.W. Bush
56	Circuit Judge	Karen Nelson Moore	Cleveland, OH	1948	1995–present	—	—	Clinton
58	Circuit Judge	Eric L. Clay	Detroit, MI	1948	1997–present	—	—	Clinton
65	Circuit Judge	Richard Allen Griffin	Traverse City, MI	1952	2005–present	—	—	G.W. Bush
67	Circuit Judge	Raymond Kethledge	Ann Arbor, MI	1966	2008–present	—	—	G.W. Bush
71	Circuit Judge	Amul Thapar	Covington, KY	1969	2017–present	—	—	Trump
72	Circuit Judge	John K. Bush	Louisville, KY	1964	2017–present	—	—	Trump
73	Circuit Judge	Joan Larsen	Ann Arbor, MI	1968	2017–present	—	—	Trump
74	Circuit Judge	John Nalbandian	Cincinnati, OH	1969	2018–present	—	—	Trump
75	Circuit Judge	Chad Readler	Columbus, OH	1972	2019–present	—	—	Trump
76	Circuit Judge	Eric E. Murphy	Columbus, OH	1979	2019–present	—	—	Trump
77	Circuit Judge	Stephanie D. Davis	Detroit, MI	1967	2022–present	—	—	Biden
78	Circuit Judge	Andre Mathis	Memphis, TN	1980	2022–present	—	—	Biden
79	Circuit Judge	Rachel Bloomekatz	Columbus, OH	1982	2023–present	—	—	Biden
80	Circuit Judge	Kevin G. Ritz	Memphis, TN	1974	2024–present	—	—	Biden
81	Circuit Judge	Whitney Hermandorfer	Nashville, TN	1987	2025–present	—	—	Trump
47	Senior Circuit Judge	Ralph B. Guy Jr.	Ann Arbor, MI	1929	1985–1994	—	1994–present	Reagan
49	Senior Circuit Judge	James L. Ryan	inactive	1932	1985–2000	—	2000–present	Reagan
50	Senior Circuit Judge	Danny Julian Boggs	Louisville, KY	1944	1986–2017	2003–2009	2017–present	Reagan
51	Senior Circuit Judge	Alan Eugene Norris	Columbus, OH	1935	1986–2001	—	2001–present	Reagan
52	Senior Circuit Judge	Richard Fred Suhrheinrich	Lansing, MI	1936	1990–2001	—	2001–present	G.H.W. Bush
53	Senior Circuit Judge	Eugene E. Siler Jr.	London, KY	1936	1991–2001	—	2001–present	G.H.W. Bush
54	Senior Circuit Judge	Alice M. Batchelder	Medina, OH	1944	1991–2019	2009–2014	2019–present	G.H.W. Bush
55	Senior Circuit Judge	Martha Craig Daughtrey	Nashville, TN	1942	1993–2009	—	2009–present	Clinton
57	Senior Circuit Judge	R. Guy Cole Jr.	Columbus, OH	1951	1995–2023	2014–2021	2023–present	Clinton
59	Senior Circuit Judge	Ronald Lee Gilman	Memphis, TN	1942	1997–2010	—	2010–present	Clinton
60	Senior Circuit Judge	Julia Smith Gibbons	Memphis, TN	1950	2002–2024	—	2024–present	G.W. Bush
61	Senior Circuit Judge	John M. Rogers	Lexington, KY	1948	2002–2018	—	2018–present	G.W. Bush
63	Senior Circuit Judge	Deborah L. Cook	Akron, OH	1952	2003–2019	—	2019–present	G.W. Bush
64	Senior Circuit Judge	David McKeague	Lansing, MI	1946	2005–2017	—	2017–present	G.W. Bush
68	Senior Circuit Judge	Helene White	Detroit, MI	1954	2008–2022	—	2022–present	G.W. Bush
69	Senior Circuit Judge	Jane Branstetter Stranch	Nashville, TN	1953	2010–2025	—	2025–present	Obama

== Judges of the Seventh Circuit ==
As of November 3, 2025:

#	Title	Judge	Duty station	Born	Term of service			Appointed by
#	Title	Judge	Duty station	Born	Active	Chief	Senior	Appointed by
57	Chief Judge	Michael B. Brennan	Milwaukee, WI	1963	2018–present	2025–present	—	Trump
45	Circuit Judge	Frank Easterbrook	Chicago, IL	1948	1985–present	2006–2013	—	Reagan
58	Circuit Judge	Michael Y. Scudder	Chicago, IL	1971	2018–present	—	—	Trump
59	Circuit Judge	Amy St. Eve	Chicago, IL	1965	2018–present	—	—	Trump
60	Circuit Judge	Thomas Kirsch	Hammond, IN	1974	2020–present	—	—	Trump
61	Circuit Judge	Candace Jackson-Akiwumi	Chicago, IL	1979	2021–present	—	—	Biden
62	Circuit Judge	John Z. Lee	Chicago, IL	1968	2022–present	—	—	Biden
63	Circuit Judge	Doris Pryor	Indianapolis, IN	1977	2022–present	—	—	Biden
64	Circuit Judge	Joshua P. Kolar	Hammond, IN	1976	2024–present	—	—	Biden
65	Circuit Judge	Nancy L. Maldonado	Chicago, IL	1975	2024–present	—	—	Biden
66	Circuit Judge	Rebecca Taibleson	Milwaukee, WI	1983	2025–present	—	—	Trump
38	Senior Circuit Judge	William J. Bauer	inactive	1926	1974–1994	1986–1993	1994–present	Ford
46	Senior Circuit Judge	Kenneth Francis Ripple	South Bend, IN	1943	1985–2008	—	2008–present	Reagan
49	Senior Circuit Judge	Ilana Rovner	Chicago, IL	1938	1992–2024	—	2024–present	G.H.W. Bush
53	Senior Circuit Judge	Diane S. Sykes	Milwaukee, WI	1957	2004–2025	2020–2025	2025–present	G.W. Bush
55	Senior Circuit Judge	David Hamilton	Bloomington, IN	1957	2009–2022	—	2022–present	Obama

== Judges of the Eighth Circuit ==
As of March 11, 2024:

#	Title	Judge	Duty station	Born	Term of service			Appointed by
#	Title	Judge	Duty station	Born	Active	Chief	Senior	Appointed by
55	Chief Judge	Steven Colloton	Des Moines, IA	1963	2003–present	2024–present	—	G.W. Bush
46	Circuit Judge	James B. Loken	Minneapolis, MN	1940	1990–present	2003–2010	—	G.H.W. Bush
54	Circuit Judge	Lavenski Smith	Little Rock, AR	1958	2002–present	2017–2024	—	G.W. Bush
56	Circuit Judge	Raymond Gruender	Saint Louis, MO	1963	2004–present	—	—	G.W. Bush
57	Circuit Judge	Duane Benton	Kansas City, MO	1950	2004–present	—	—	G.W. Bush
58	Circuit Judge	Bobby Shepherd	El Dorado, AR	1951	2006–present	—	—	G.W. Bush
59	Circuit Judge	Jane L. Kelly	Cedar Rapids, IA	1964	2013–present	—	—	Obama
60	Circuit Judge	Ralph R. Erickson	Fargo, ND	1959	2017–present	—	—	Trump
61	Circuit Judge	L. Steven Grasz	Omaha, NE	1961	2018–present	—	—	Trump
62	Circuit Judge	David Stras	Minneapolis, MN	1974	2018–present	—	—	Trump
63	Circuit Judge	Jonathan A. Kobes	Sioux Falls, SD	1974	2018–present	—	—	Trump
42	Senior Circuit Judge	Pasco Bowman II	inactive	1933	1983–2003	1998–1999	2003–present	Reagan
43	Senior Circuit Judge	Roger Leland Wollman	inactive	1934	1985–2018	1999–2002	2018–present	Reagan
47	Senior Circuit Judge	David R. Hansen	inactive	1938	1991–2003	2002–2003	2003–present	G.H.W. Bush
48	Senior Circuit Judge	Morris S. Arnold	Little Rock, AR	1941	1992–2006	—	2006–present	G.H.W. Bush
53	Senior Circuit Judge	Michael Joseph Melloy	inactive	1948	2002–2013	—	2013–present	G.W. Bush

== Judges of the Ninth Circuit ==
As of November 7, 2025:

#	Title	Judge	Duty station	Born	Term of service			Appointed by
#	Title	Judge	Duty station	Born	Active	Chief	Senior	Appointed by
94	Chief Judge	Mary H. Murguia	Phoenix, AZ	1960	2011–present	2021–present	—	Obama
79	Circuit Judge	Kim McLane Wardlaw	Pasadena, CA	1954	1998–present	—	—	Clinton
82	Circuit Judge	Ronald M. Gould	Seattle, WA	1946	1999–present	—	—	Clinton
86	Circuit Judge	Johnnie B. Rawlinson	Las Vegas, NV	1952	2000–present	—	—	Clinton
89	Circuit Judge	Consuelo Callahan	Sacramento, CA	1950	2003–present	—	—	G.W. Bush
91	Circuit Judge	Milan Smith	El Segundo, CA	1942	2006–present	—	—	G.W. Bush
95	Circuit Judge	Morgan Christen	Anchorage, AK	1961	2012–present	—	—	Obama
96	Circuit Judge	Jacqueline Nguyen	Pasadena, CA	1965	2012–present	—	—	Obama
99	Circuit Judge	John B. Owens	San Diego, CA	1971	2014–present	—	—	Obama
100	Circuit Judge	Michelle Friedland	San Jose, CA	1972	2014–present	—	—	Obama
101	Circuit Judge	Mark J. Bennett	Honolulu, HI	1953	2018–present	—	—	Trump
102	Circuit Judge	Ryan D. Nelson	Idaho Falls, ID	1973	2018–present	—	—	Trump
103	Circuit Judge	Eric D. Miller	Seattle, WA	1975	2019–present	—	—	Trump
104	Circuit Judge	Bridget S. Bade	Phoenix, AZ	1965	2019–present	—	—	Trump
105	Circuit Judge	Daniel P. Collins	Pasadena, CA	1963	2019–present	—	—	Trump
106	Circuit Judge	Kenneth K. Lee	San Diego, CA	1975	2019–present	—	—	Trump
107	Circuit Judge	Daniel Bress	San Francisco, CA	1979	2019–present	—	—	Trump
108	Circuit Judge	Danielle J. Forrest	Portland, OR	1977	2019–present	—	—	Trump
109	Circuit Judge	Patrick J. Bumatay	San Diego, CA	1978	2019–present	—	—	Trump
110	Circuit Judge	Lawrence VanDyke	Reno, NV	1972	2020–present	—	—	Trump
111	Circuit Judge	Lucy Koh	San Francisco, CA	1968	2021–present	—	—	Biden
112	Circuit Judge	Jennifer Sung	Portland, OR	1972	2021–present	—	—	Biden
113	Circuit Judge	Gabriel P. Sanchez	San Francisco, CA	1976	2022–present	—	—	Biden
114	Circuit Judge	Holly A. Thomas	Pasadena, CA	1979	2022–present	—	—	Biden
115	Circuit Judge	Salvador Mendoza Jr.	Richland, WA	1971	2022–present	—	—	Biden
116	Circuit Judge	Roopali Desai	Phoenix, AZ	1978	2022–present	—	—	Biden
117	Circuit Judge	Anthony Johnstone	Missoula, MT	1973	2023–present	—	—	Biden
118	Circuit Judge	Ana de Alba	Fresno, CA	1979	2023–present	—	—	Biden
119	Circuit Judge	Eric Tung	Pasadena, CA	1984	2025–present	—	—	Trump
40	Senior Circuit Judge	J. Clifford Wallace	San Diego, CA	1928	1972–1996	1991–1996	1996–present	Nixon
47	Senior Circuit Judge	Mary M. Schroeder	Phoenix, AZ	1940	1979–2011	2000–2007	2011–present	Carter
54	Senior Circuit Judge	Dorothy Wright Nelson	Pasadena, CA	1928	1979–1995	—	1995–present	Carter
55	Senior Circuit Judge	William Canby	Phoenix, AZ	1931	1980–1996	—	1996–present	Carter
66	Senior Circuit Judge	Diarmuid O'Scannlain	Portland, OR	1937	1986–2016	—	2016–present	Reagan
68	Senior Circuit Judge	Stephen S. Trott	inactive	1939	1988–2004	—	2004–present	Reagan
69	Senior Circuit Judge	Ferdinand Fernandez	Pasadena, CA	1937	1989–2002	—	2002–present	G.H.W. Bush
72	Senior Circuit Judge	Andrew Kleinfeld	Fairbanks, AK	1945	1991–2010	—	2010–present	G.H.W. Bush
73	Senior Circuit Judge	Michael Daly Hawkins	Phoenix, AZ	1945	1994–2010	—	2010–present	Clinton
74	Senior Circuit Judge	A. Wallace Tashima	Pasadena, CA	1934	1996–2004	—	2004–present	Clinton
75	Senior Circuit Judge	Sidney R. Thomas	Billings, MT	1953	1996–2023	2014–2021	2023–present	Clinton
76	Senior Circuit Judge	Barry G. Silverman	Phoenix, AZ	1951	1998–2016	—	2016–present	Clinton
77	Senior Circuit Judge	Susan P. Graber	Portland, OR	1949	1998–2021	—	2021–present	Clinton
78	Senior Circuit Judge	M. Margaret McKeown	San Diego, CA	1951	1998–2022	—	2022–present	Clinton
80	Senior Circuit Judge	William A. Fletcher	San Francisco, CA	1945	1998–2022	—	2022–present	Clinton
83	Senior Circuit Judge	Richard Paez	Pasadena, CA	1947	2000–2021	—	2021–present	Clinton
84	Senior Circuit Judge	Marsha Berzon	San Francisco, CA	1945	2000–2022	—	2022–present	Clinton
85	Senior Circuit Judge	Richard C. Tallman	Coeur d'Alene, ID	1953	2000–2018	—	2018–present	Clinton
87	Senior Circuit Judge	Richard Clifton	Honolulu, HI	1950	2002–2016	—	2016–present	G.W. Bush
88	Senior Circuit Judge	Jay Bybee	Las Vegas, NV	1953	2003–2019	—	2019–present	G.W. Bush
90	Senior Circuit Judge	Carlos Bea	San Francisco, CA	1934	2003–2019	—	2019–present	G.W. Bush
92	Senior Circuit Judge	Sandra Segal Ikuta	Pasadena, CA	1954	2006–2025	—	2025–present	G.W. Bush
93	Senior Circuit Judge	N. Randy Smith	Pocatello, ID	1949	2007–2018	—	2018–present	G.W. Bush
98	Senior Circuit Judge	Andrew D. Hurwitz	Phoenix, AZ	1947	2012–2022	—	2022–present	Obama

== Judges of the Tenth Circuit ==
As of December 13, 2023:

#	Title	Judge	Duty station	Born	Term of service			Appointed by
#	Title	Judge	Duty station	Born	Active	Chief	Senior	Appointed by
38	Chief Judge	Jerome Holmes	Oklahoma City, OK	1961	2006–present	2022–present	—	G.W. Bush
33	Circuit Judge	Harris Hartz	Albuquerque, NM	1947	2001–present	—	—	G.W. Bush
36	Circuit Judge	Timothy Tymkovich	Denver, CO	1956	2003–present	2015–2022	—	G.W. Bush
39	Circuit Judge	Scott Matheson Jr.	Salt Lake City, UT	1953	2010–present	—	—	Obama
40	Circuit Judge	Robert E. Bacharach	Oklahoma City, OK	1959	2013–present	—	—	Obama
41	Circuit Judge	Gregory A. Phillips	Cheyenne, WY	1960	2013–present	—	—	Obama
42	Circuit Judge	Carolyn B. McHugh	Salt Lake City, UT	1957	2014–present	—	—	Obama
43	Circuit Judge	Nancy Moritz	Topeka, KS	1960	2014–present	—	—	Obama
44	Circuit Judge	Allison H. Eid	Denver, CO	1965	2017–present	—	—	Trump
45	Circuit Judge	Joel M. Carson III	Roswell, NM	1971	2018–present	—	—	Trump
46	Circuit Judge	Veronica S. Rossman	Denver, CO	1972	2021–present	—	—	Biden
47	Circuit Judge	Richard Federico	Topeka, KS	1977	2023–present	—	—	Biden
21	Senior Circuit Judge	Stephanie Kulp Seymour	Tulsa, OK	1940	1979–2005	1994–2000	2005–present	Carter
22	Senior Circuit Judge	John Carbone Porfilio	inactive	1934	1985–1999	—	1999–present	Reagan
23	Senior Circuit Judge	Stephen H. Anderson	inactive	1932	1985–2000	—	2000–present	Reagan
25	Senior Circuit Judge	Bobby Baldock	Roswell, NM	1936	1985–2001	—	2001–present	Reagan
26	Senior Circuit Judge	Wade Brorby	inactive	1934	1988–2001	—	2001–present	Reagan
27	Senior Circuit Judge	David M. Ebel	Denver, CO	1940	1988–2006	—	2006–present	Reagan
28	Senior Circuit Judge	Paul Joseph Kelly Jr.	Santa Fe, NM	1940	1992–2017	—	2017–present	G.H.W. Bush
30	Senior Circuit Judge	Mary Beck Briscoe	inactive	1947	1995–2021	2010–2015	2021–present	Clinton
31	Senior Circuit Judge	Carlos F. Lucero	Denver, CO	1940	1995–2021	—	2021–present	Clinton
32	Senior Circuit Judge	Michael R. Murphy	Salt Lake City, UT	1947	1995–2012	—	2012–present	Clinton
34	Senior Circuit Judge	Terrence L. O'Brien	Cheyenne, WY	1943	2002–2013	—	2013–present	G.W. Bush

== Judges of the Eleventh Circuit ==
As of January 2, 2025:

#	Title	Judge	Duty station	Born	Term of service			Appointed by
#	Title	Judge	Duty station	Born	Active	Chief	Senior	Appointed by
29	Chief Judge	William H. Pryor Jr.	Birmingham, AL	1962	2004–present (Note: Recess appointment; formally nominated on April 9, 2003, given a recess appointment on February 20, 2004, confirmed by the United States Senate on June 9, 2005, and received commission on June 10, 2005)	2020–present	—	G.W. Bush
31	Circuit Judge	Adalberto Jordan	Miami, FL	1961	2012–present	—	—	Obama
32	Circuit Judge	Robin S. Rosenbaum	Fort Lauderdale, FL	1966	2014–present	—	—	Obama
34	Circuit Judge	Jill A. Pryor	Atlanta, GA	1963	2014–present	—	—	Obama
35	Circuit Judge	Kevin Newsom	Birmingham, AL	1972	2017–present	—	—	Trump
36	Circuit Judge	Elizabeth L. Branch	Atlanta, GA	1968	2018–present	—	—	Trump
37	Circuit Judge	Britt Grant	Atlanta, GA	1978	2018–present	—	—	Trump
38	Circuit Judge	Robert J. Luck	Tallahassee, FL	1979	2019–present	—	—	Trump
39	Circuit Judge	Barbara Lagoa	Miami, FL	1967	2019–present	—	—	Trump
40	Circuit Judge	Andrew L. Brasher	Birmingham, AL	1981	2020–present	—	—	Trump
41	Circuit Judge	Nancy Abudu	Atlanta, GA	1974	2023–present	—	—	Biden
42	Circuit Judge	Embry Kidd	Orlando, FL	1983	2025–present	—	—	Biden
9	Senior Circuit Judge	Gerald Bard Tjoflat	Jacksonville, FL	1929	1981–2019 (Note: Reassigned from the 5th Circuit.)	1989–1996	2019–present	Ford / Operation of law
15	Senior Circuit Judge	R. Lanier Anderson III	Macon, GA	1936	1981–2009	1999–2002	2009–present	Carter / Operation of law
19	Senior Circuit Judge	James Larry Edmondson	Jasper, GA	1947	1986–2012	2002–2009	2012–present	Reagan
22	Senior Circuit Judge	Joel Fredrick Dubina	Montgomery, AL	1947	1990–2013	2009–2013	2013–present	G.H.W. Bush
23	Senior Circuit Judge	Susan H. Black	Jacksonville, FL	1943	1992–2011	—	2011–present	G.H.W. Bush
24	Senior Circuit Judge	Edward Earl Carnes	Montgomery, AL	1950	1992–2020	2013–2020	2020–present	G.H.W. Bush
26	Senior Circuit Judge	Frank M. Hull	Atlanta, GA	1948	1997–2017	—	2017–present	Clinton
27	Senior Circuit Judge	Stanley Marcus	West Palm Beach, FL	1946	1997–2019	—	2019–present	Clinton
28	Senior Circuit Judge	Charles R. Wilson	Tampa, FL	1954	1999–2024	—	2024–present	Clinton
33	Senior Circuit Judge	Julie E. Carnes	Atlanta, GA	1950	2014–2018	—	2018–present	Obama

== Judges of the District of Columbia Circuit ==
As of January 16, 2024:

#	Title	Judge	Duty station	Born	Term of service			Appointed by
#	Title	Judge	Duty station	Born	Active	Chief	Senior	Appointed by
58	Chief Judge	Sri Srinivasan	Washington, D.C.	1967	2013–present	2020–present	—	Obama
49	Circuit Judge	Karen L. Henderson	Washington, D.C.	1944	1990–present	—	—	G.H.W. Bush
59	Circuit Judge	Patricia Millett	Washington, D.C.	1963	2013–present	—	—	Obama
60	Circuit Judge	Cornelia Pillard	Washington, D.C.	1961	2013–present	—	—	Obama
61	Circuit Judge	Robert L. Wilkins	Washington, D.C.	1963	2014–present	—	—	Obama
62	Circuit Judge	Gregory G. Katsas	Washington, D.C.	1964	2017–present	—	—	Trump
63	Circuit Judge	Neomi Rao	Washington, D.C.	1973	2019–present	—	—	Trump
64	Circuit Judge	Justin R. Walker	Washington, D.C.	1982	2020–present	—	—	Trump
66	Circuit Judge	J. Michelle Childs	Washington, D.C.	1966	2022–present	—	—	Biden
67	Circuit Judge	Florence Y. Pan	Washington, D.C.	1966	2022–present	—	—	Biden
68	Circuit Judge	Brad Garcia	Washington, D.C.	1986	2023–present	—	—	Biden
38	Senior Circuit Judge	Harry T. Edwards	Washington, D.C.	1940	1980–2005	1994–2001	2005–present	Carter
46	Senior Circuit Judge	Douglas H. Ginsburg	Washington, D.C.	1946	1986–2011	2001–2008	2011–present	Reagan
47	Senior Circuit Judge	David B. Sentelle	inactive	1943	1987–2013	2008–2013	2013–present	Reagan
50	Senior Circuit Judge	A. Raymond Randolph	Washington, D.C.	1943	1990–2008	—	2008–present	G.H.W. Bush
51	Senior Circuit Judge	Judith W. Rogers	Washington, D.C.	1939	1994–2022	—	2022–present	Clinton

== Judges of the Federal Circuit ==
As of March 16, 2022:

#	Title	Judge	Duty station	Born	Term of service			Appointed by
#	Title	Judge	Duty station	Born	Active	Chief	Senior	Appointed by
31	Chief Judge	Kimberly A. Moore	Washington, D.C.	1968	2006–present	2021–present	—	G.W. Bush
16	Circuit Judge	Pauline Newman (Note: Suspended from September 20, 2023 through August 29, 2026.)	Washington, D.C.	1927	1984–present	—	—	Reagan
22	Circuit Judge	Alan David Lourie	Washington, D.C.	1935	1990–present	—	—	G.H.W. Bush
29	Circuit Judge	Timothy B. Dyk	Washington, D.C.	1937	2000–present	—	—	Clinton
30	Circuit Judge	Sharon Prost	Washington, D.C.	1951	2001–present	2014–2021	—	G.W. Bush
33	Circuit Judge	Jimmie V. Reyna	Washington, D.C.	1952	2011–present	—	—	Obama
35	Circuit Judge	Richard G. Taranto	Washington, D.C.	1957	2013–present	—	—	Obama
36	Circuit Judge	Raymond T. Chen	Washington, D.C.	1968	2013–present	—	—	Obama
37	Circuit Judge	Todd M. Hughes	Washington, D.C.	1966	2013–present	—	—	Obama
38	Circuit Judge	Kara Farnandez Stoll	Washington, D.C.	1968	2015–present	—	—	Obama
39	Circuit Judge	Tiffany P. Cunningham	Washington, D.C.	1976	2021–present	—	—	Biden
40	Circuit Judge	Leonard P. Stark	Washington, D.C.	1969	2022–present	—	—	Biden
19	Senior Circuit Judge	Haldane Robert Mayer	Washington, D.C.	1941	1987–2010	1997–2004	2010–present	Reagan
21	Senior Circuit Judge	S. Jay Plager	Washington, D.C.	1931	1989–2000	—	2000–present	G.H.W. Bush
23	Senior Circuit Judge	Raymond C. Clevenger	Washington, D.C.	1937	1990–2006	—	2006–present	G.H.W. Bush
25	Senior Circuit Judge	Alvin Anthony Schall	Washington, D.C.	1944	1992–2009	—	2009–present	G.H.W. Bush
26	Senior Circuit Judge	William Curtis Bryson	Washington, D.C.	1945	1994–2013	—	2013–present	Clinton
28	Senior Circuit Judge	Richard Linn	Washington, D.C.	1944	1999–2012	—	2012–present	Clinton
34	Senior Circuit Judge	Evan Wallach	Washington, D.C.	1949	2011–2021	—	2021–present	Obama

== See also ==
- List of current United States district judges
