= Circuit judge =

Circuit judge may refer to:

- Circuit judge, a judge in a circuit court in various jurisdictions
  - Circuit judge (England and Wales)
- Circuit judge, a judge who sits on any of the United States courts of appeals, known as circuit courts
  - List of current United States circuit judges
- Circuit judge, a judge who sat on the now defunct United States circuit court

== See also ==
- Circuit justice, of the Supreme Court of the United States
- Circuit riding
