= Arterton =

Arterton is an English surname. Notable people with the surname include:

- Gemma Arterton (born 1986), English actress, activist, and film producer
- Hannah Arterton (born 1989), English actress, sister of Gemma
- Janet Bond Arterton (born 1944), American judge
