= Betty Binns Fletcher =

American judge (1923–2012)

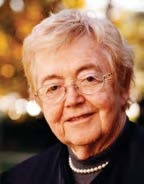

Senior Judge of the United States Court of Appeals for the Ninth Circuit
- In office November 1, 1998 – October 22, 2012

Judge of the United States Court of Appeals for the Ninth Circuit
- In office September 26, 1979 – November 1, 1998
- Appointed by: Jimmy Carter
- Preceded by: Seat established by 92 Stat. 1629
- Succeeded by: Richard C. Tallman

Personal details
- Born: Elizabeth Binns; March 29, 1923 Tacoma, Washington, US
- Died: October 22, 2012 (aged 89) Seattle, Washington, US
- Children: William A. Fletcher
- Education: Stanford University (BA); University of Washington (LLB)

Betty Binns Fletcher (née Binns; March 29, 1923 – October 22, 2012) was an American lawyer and judge. She served as a United States circuit judge of the San Francisco-based United States Court of Appeals for the Ninth Circuit between 1979 and 2012. Fletcher was one of the first women to become a partner in a major American law firm and the second woman to be appointed to the United States Court of Appeals for the Ninth Circuit.

== Early life and education ==
Binns was born in Tacoma, Washington, to an attorney and his wife, both active New Deal Democrats. She wanted to be a lawyer from a young age. Her father sometimes allowed her to skip classes in order to watch him try cases; she graduated from the local public high school at age 16. She then attended Stanford University and graduated with a Bachelor of Arts degree in 1942 at age 19. Because so many men were away during World War II, Binns was admitted to the Stanford Law School, and completed one year before marrying Robert L. Fletcher, who was soon assigned to fly anti-aircraft blimps out of Lakehurst, New Jersey. They started a family, and moved back to Lakewood, Washington, after the war. With her parents' assistance in caring for their four young children (and renting out their own house to live in Lakewood), Fletcher resumed her legal education after a decade, now commuting to Seattle to study at the University of Washington School of Law. In 1956 she graduated at the top of her law school class, with a Bachelor of Laws.

== Private practice ==
Despite graduating at the top of her class, Fletcher had difficulty finding a job with any Seattle law firm. Finally, Charles Horowitz of Preston Gates & Ellis (later K&L Gates) took a chance on her, and Fletcher eventually became a partner at the law firm and the first woman partner at any major Pacific Northwest law firm. Fletcher thus was in private practice from 1956 to 1979, and earned a reputation for pragmatism. She was instrumental in expanding the firm's presence in Asia, and also inherited Horowitz's clients when he accepted a position on the Washington Supreme Court in 1975. Her clients included former United States Supreme Court Associate Justice William O. Douglas. Fletcher was an active member of the Washington State Bar Association and from 1972 to 1973 served as the first female president of the King County Bar Association.

== Federal judicial service ==
Fletcher was nominated by President Jimmy Carter on July 12, 1979, to a new seat on the United States Court of Appeals for the Ninth Circuit, created by 92 Stat. 1629. She was confirmed by the United States Senate on September 26, 1979, and received her commission the same day. Fletcher assumed senior status on November 1, 1998, after her son William A. Fletcher joined the Ninth Circuit bench. She died on October 22, 2012.

Several of Fletcher's clerks were nominated to administrative and judicial positions during the Joe Biden administration, including Tiffany Cartwright, Kalpana Kotagal, Alison Nathan, Jennifer Sung, and Nicole Berner.

Legal offices
Preceded by Seat established by 92 Stat. 1629	Judge of the United States Court of Appeals for the Ninth Circuit; 1979–1998	Succeeded by Richard C. Tallman
