= Victor Allen Bolden =

American judge (born 1965)

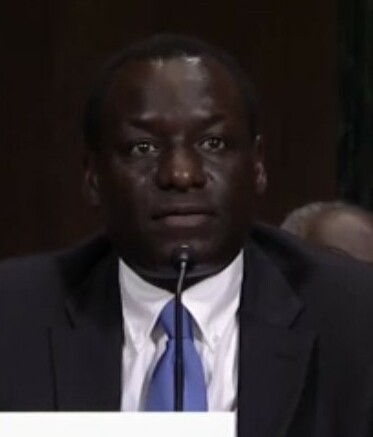
- Bolden in 2014

Judge of the United States District Court for the District of Connecticut
- Incumbent
- Assumed office November 21, 2014
- Appointed by: Barack Obama
- Preceded by: Janet Bond Arterton

Personal details
- Born: May 6, 1965 (age 60) New York City, U.S.
- Party: Democratic
- Education: Columbia University (AB); Harvard University (JD)

Victor Allen Bolden (born May 6, 1965) is a United States district judge of the United States District Court for the District of Connecticut and former corporation counsel for the City of New Haven, Connecticut.

== Biography ==
Bolden received an Artium Baccalaureus degree in 1986 from Columbia University. He received a Juris Doctor in 1989 from Harvard Law School. He began his legal career as a Marvin Karpatkin Fellow, from 1989 to 1990, and then as a staff attorney at the American Civil Liberties Union Foundation, from 1990 to 1994. He served as assistant counsel at the NAACP Legal Defense and Educational Fund, from 1994 to 2000. From 2000 to 2005, he worked at the law firm of Wiggin & Dana, where he handled a wide variety of commercial litigation matters. From 2005 to 2009, he returned to the NAACP Legal Defense and Educational Fund as general counsel. From 2009 to 2014, he served as corporation counsel for the City of New Haven, Connecticut.

=== Federal judicial service ===
On June 16, 2014, President Barack Obama nominated Bolden to serve as a United States district judge of the United States District Court for the District of Connecticut, to the seat vacated by Judge Janet Bond Arterton, who assumed senior status on July 1, 2014. On July 29, 2014 a hearing on his nomination was held before the United States Senate Committee on the Judiciary. On September 18, 2014 his nomination was reported out of committee by a 10–8 vote. On November 18, 2014 Senate Majority Leader Harry Reid filed for cloture on his nomination. On November 19, 2014, the United States Senate invoked cloture on his nomination by a 51–44 vote. On November 20, 2014, Bolden was confirmed by a 49–46 vote. He received his judicial commission on November 21, 2014.

== See also ==
- List of African American federal judges
- List of African American jurists

Legal offices
Preceded by Janet Bond Arterton	Judge of the United States District Court for the District of Connecticut; 2014–present	Incumbent
