= Lisa Schultz Bressman =

American academic and lawyer

- Born: Lisa Schultz
- Spouse: Michael Bressman
- Children: 3

Academic background
- Education: Wellesley College (BA); University of Chicago (JD)

Academic work
- Discipline: Law
- Sub-discipline: Administrative law Constitutional law Regulatory law
- Institutions: Office of Legal Counsel; Vanderbilt University

Lisa Schultz Bressman is an American academic and lawyer working as the associate dean and David Daniels Allen Distinguished Chair in Law at the Vanderbilt University Law School. She specializes in administrative law and Constitutional theory.

== Education ==
Bressman earned a Bachelor of Arts degree in English and philosophy from Wellesley College in 1988 and a J.D. degree from the University of Chicago Law School in 1993.

== Career ==
After earning her bachelor's degree, Bressman worked as a financial analyst for First Boston from 1988 to 1990. She served as an attorney-advisor the Office of Legal Counsel from 1996 to 1998 and clerked for Supreme Court Justice Stephen Breyer and Connecticut District Judge José A. Cabranes. For one year, Bressman worked as an associate at Kellogg, Hansen, Todd, Figel & Frederick in Washington, D.C. She joined Vanderbilt University Law School in 1998; she teaches administrative law and constitutional law. Bressman was also a visiting professor of law at Cornell Law School in 2006 and Harvard Law School in 2008.

== Personal life ==
Bressman is married to Michael Bressman, an attorney and law professor at Vanderbilt who specializes in intellectual property, contracts, and IT law. She has three children.

== See also ==
- List of law clerks for the second seat of the Supreme Court of the United States
