= United States Foreign Intelligence Surveillance Court of Review =

United States Article III court

- (F.I.S.C.R.)
- Location: Washington, D.C.
- Appeals to: Supreme Court of the United States
- Appeals from: United States Foreign Intelligence Surveillance Court
- Established: October 25, 1978
- Authority: Article III court
- Created by: Foreign Intelligence Surveillance Act; 50 U.S.C. § 1803
- Composition method: Chief Justice appointment
- Judges: 3
- Judge term length: 7 years
- Presiding Judge: Stephen A. Higginson
- www.fisc.uscourts.gov/FISCR

The United States Foreign Intelligence Surveillance Court of Review (FISCR) is a U.S. federal court whose sole purpose is to review denials of applications for electronic surveillance warrants (called FISA warrants) by the United States Foreign Intelligence Surveillance Court (or FISC). The FISCR was established by the Foreign Intelligence Surveillance Act of 1978 (known as FISA for short) and consists of a panel of three judges. Like the FISC, the FISCR is not an adversarial court; rather, the only party to the court is the federal government, although other parties may submit briefs as amici curiae if they are made aware of the proceedings. Papers are filed and proceedings are held in secret. Records of the proceedings are kept classified, though copies of the proceedings with sensitive information redacted are very occasionally made public. The government may appeal decisions of the FISCR to the Supreme Court of the United States, which hears appeals on a discretionary basis.

There is no provision for review or appeal of a grant of a warrant application, only of a denial. That is because in both the FISC and the FISCR, the government – the party who seeks a warrant to conduct surveillance – is the only party before the court, and it is unusual for anyone else to become aware of the warrant application in the first place.

The judges of the Court of Review are district or appellate federal judges, appointed by the Chief Justice of the United States for seven-year terms. Their terms are staggered so that there are at least two years between consecutive appointments. A judge may be appointed only once to either the FISCR or the FISC.

== Notable cases ==
=== In re Sealed Case ===
The FISCR was called into session for the first time in 2002 in a case referred to as In re: Sealed Case No. 02-001. The FISC had granted a FISA warrant to the Federal Bureau of Investigation (FBI) but had placed restrictions on its use; specifically, the FBI was denied the ability to use evidence gathered under the warrant in criminal cases. FISCR allowed a coalition of civil liberties groups, including the American Civil Liberties Union and the Electronic Frontier Foundation, to file amicus briefs opposing the FBI's new surveillance programs. The FISCR held that the restrictions that the FISC had placed on the warrant violated both FISA and the USA PATRIOT Act and that there was no constitutional requirement for those restrictions.

=== In re Directives ===
In August 2008, the FISCR affirmed the constitutionality of the Protect America Act of 2007 in a heavily redacted opinion, In re Directives [redacted text] Pursuant to Section 105B of the Foreign Intelligence Surveillance Act, released on January 15, 2009. In re Directives was only the second such public ruling since FISA's enactment.

=== In re Certification of Questions of Law ===
In May 2018, the FISCR affirmed an en banc order holding that three public interest groups had "standing to seek disclosure of the classified portions of the opinions at issue." The three groups were the American Civil Liberties Union Foundation, the American Civil Liberties Union of the Nation's Capital, and the Media Freedom and Information Access Clinic at Yale University. The government had argued that none of the groups had a legal right to compel disclosure of FISC opinions. The FISCR disagreed, holding: "The flaw in the government's position is that it attacks the merits of the movants' claim rather than whether the claim is judicially cognizable. In other words, the government confuses the question of whether the movants have a First Amendment right of access to FISC opinions with the question of whether they have a right merely to assert that claim. Courts have repeatedly pointed out that there is a distinction between whether the plaintiff has shown injury for purposes of standing and whether the plaintiff can succeed on the merits."

== Composition ==
Note that the start dates of service for some judges conflict among sources.

=== Current membership ===
Name	Court	Start	End	Presiding Start	Presiding End	FISCR Appointer (Chief Justice)	Original Appointer (President)
Stephen Higginson	5th Cir.	February 25, 2021	May 18, 2027	August 16, 2023	present	John Roberts	Barack Obama
Timothy Tymkovich	10th Cir.	November 1, 2023	May 18, 2030	–	–	John Roberts	George W. Bush
Lisa Godbey Wood	S.D. Ga.	November 1, 2023	May 18, 2030	–	–	John Roberts	George W. Bush

=== Former members ===
Name	Court	Start	End	Presiding Start	Presiding End	FISCR Appointer (Chief Justice)	Original Appointer (President)
Morris Arnold	8th Cir.	May 19, 2008	August 31, 2013	September 10, 2012	August 31, 2013	John Roberts	George H. W. Bush
Bobby Baldock	10th Cir.	June 17, 1992	May 18, 1998	–	–	William Rehnquist	Ronald Reagan
James Barrett	10th Cir.	May 19, 1979	May 18, 1984	–	–	Warren Burger	Richard Nixon
William Bryson	Fed. Cir.	May 19, 2011	May 18, 2018	September 10, 2013	May 18, 2018	John Roberts	Bill Clinton
José Cabranes	2nd Cir.	August 9, 2013	May 18, 2020	May 19, 2018	May 18, 2020	John Roberts	Bill Clinton
John Field	4th Cir.	May 19, 1982	May 18, 1989	–	–	Warren Burger	Richard Nixon
Ralph Guy	6th Cir.	October 8, 1998	May 18, 2005	May 19, 2001	May 18, 2005	William Rehnquist	Ronald Reagan
Leon Higginbotham	3rd Cir.	May 19, 1979	May 18, 1986	May 19, 1979	May 18, 1986	Warren Burger	Jimmy Carter
Edward Leavy	9th Cir.	September 25, 2001	May 18, 2008	May 19, 2005	May 18, 2008	William Rehnquist	Ronald Reagan
George MacKinnon	D.C. Cir.	May 19, 1979	May 18, 1982	–	–	Warren Burger	Richard Nixon
Robert Miller	N.D. Ind.	July 8, 2020	September 15, 2023	–	–	John Roberts	Ronald Reagan
Edward Northrop	D. Md.	January 11, 1985	January 10, 1992	–	–	Warren Burger	John F. Kennedy
Paul Roney	11th Cir.	September 13, 1994	May 18, 2001	September 13, 1994	May 18, 2001	William Rehnquist	Richard Nixon
Collins Seitz	3rd Cir.	March 19, 1987	March 18, 1994	March 19, 1987	March 18, 1994	William Rehnquist	Lyndon Johnson
Bruce Selya	1st Cir.	October 8, 2005	May 18, 2012	May 19, 2008	May 18, 2012	John Roberts	Ronald Reagan
David Sentelle	D.C. Cir.	May 19, 2018	September 15, 2023	May 19, 2020	September 15, 2023	John Roberts	Ronald Reagan
Laurence Silberman	D.C. Cir.	June 18, 1996	May 18, 2003	–	–	William Rehnquist	Ronald Reagan
Richard Tallman	9th Cir.	January 27, 2014	January 26, 2021	–	–	John Roberts	Bill Clinton
Robert Warren	E.D. Wis.	October 30, 1989	May 18, 1996	–	–	William Rehnquist	Richard Nixon
Ralph Winter	2nd Cir.	November 14, 2003	May 18, 2010	–	–	John Roberts	Ronald Reagan

== Seat succession ==
Presiding Judge
Higginbotham	1979–1986
Seitz	1987–1994
Roney	1994–2001
Guy	2001–2005
Leavy	2005–2008
Selya	2008–2012
Arnold	2012–2013
Bryson	2013–2018
Cabranes	2018–2020
Sentelle	2020–2023
Higginson	2023–present

Seat 1
Established on October 25, 1978 by the Foreign Intelligence Surveillance Act
Barrett	1979–1984
Northrop	1984–1992
Baldock	1992–1998
Guy	1998–2005
Selya	2005–2012
Cabranes	2013–2020
Miller	2020–2023
Wood	2023–present

Seat 2
Established on October 25, 1978 by the Foreign Intelligence Surveillance Act
Higginbotham	1979–1986
Seitz	1987–1994
Roney	1994–2001
Leavy	2001–2008
Arnold	2008–2013
Tallman	2014–2021
Higginson	2021–present

Seat 3
Established on October 25, 1978 by the Foreign Intelligence Surveillance Act
MacKinnon	1979–1982
Field	1982–1989
Warren	1989–1996
Silberman	1996–2003
Winter	2003–2010
Bryson	2011–2018
Sentelle	2018–2023
Tymkovich	2023–present
