= Julia Penny Clark =

American attorney

- Born: Oak Grove, Louisiana, U.S.
- Education: University of Texas (BA, JD)
- Occupation: Attorney
- Known for: Expert on employee benefits and pension law
- Spouse: William Curtis Bryson
- Children: 2

Julia Penny Clark is an American attorney who has argued employee benefits law cases before the United States Supreme Court.

== Biography ==
Clark was born in Oak Grove, Louisiana, and raised in Waco, Texas, where she attended La Vega High School. She studied at the University of Texas, and received a B.A. in 1969 with membership in Phi Beta Kappa. She continued her studies at the University of Texas School of Law, serving as an editor of the Texas Law Review, and graduating Order of the Coif and Chancellor honors with a J.D. in 1973. After law school, she clerked for Judge James Braxton Craven Jr. of the United States Court of Appeals for the Fourth Circuit, and then for Associate Justice of the United States Supreme Court Lewis F. Powell Jr. from 1974 to 1975. She was among the first dozen women to clerk at the U.S. Supreme Court.

Following her clerkships, she stayed in Washington, D.C. and since 1975 has practiced law at Bredhoff & Kaiser, PLLC, where she is a partner. She has argued two cases before the U.S. Supreme Court. In 2006, she argued the employee benefits case of Beck v. PACE International Union, 551 U.S. 96 (2007). In 2014, she argued M&G Polymers USA, LLC v. Tackett, 135 S. Ct. 926 (2015), concerning collective bargaining agreements under the Employee Retirement Income Security Act (ERISA). She represented Tackett and a group of retirees who sought to maintain healthcare benefits under a collective bargaining agreement. She has also argued several cases before the United States Courts of Appeal, including recently in the Second Circuit, Osberg v. Foot Locker, Inc. 862 F.3d 198 (2d Cir. 2017).

She was a member of the Advisory Committee on Admissions and Grievances for the United States Court of Appeals for the District of Columbia Circuit, 1990–1996.

== Personal life ==
Clark is married to William Curtis Bryson, a senior judge of the United States Court of Appeals for the Federal Circuit. They have two daughters. They met in law school, and both were law clerks at the U.S. Supreme Court.

== See also ==
- List of law clerks for the first seat of the Supreme Court of the United States

== Selected publications ==
- Clark, Julia P. (1973). "Note: The Duty of Fair Representation: A Theoretical Structure". Texas Law Review. 51: 1119.
