= Stephen A. Higginson =

American federal judge (born 1961)

Stephen Higginson
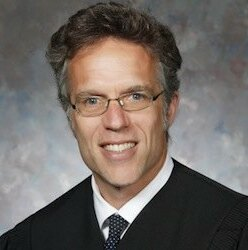
- Official portrait, c. 2011

Presiding Judge of the United States Foreign Intelligence Surveillance Court of Review
- Incumbent
- Assumed office August 16, 2023
- Appointed by: John Roberts
- Preceded by: David B. Sentelle

Judge of the United States Foreign Intelligence Surveillance Court of Review
- Incumbent
- Assumed office February 25, 2021
- Appointed by: John Roberts
- Preceded by: Richard C. Tallman

Judge of the United States Court of Appeals for the Fifth Circuit
- Incumbent
- Assumed office November 2, 2011
- Appointed by: Barack Obama
- Preceded by: Jacques L. Wiener Jr.

Personal details
- Born: Stephen Andrew Higginson; April 12, 1961 (age 65) Boston, Massachusetts, U.S.
- Education: Harvard University (BA); University of Cambridge (MPhil); Yale University (JD)

Stephen Andrew Higginson (born 1961) is an American lawyer and jurist serving since 2011 as a U.S. circuit judge of the U.S. Court of Appeals for the Fifth Circuit. He also serves as the Presiding Judge of the United States Foreign Intelligence Surveillance Court of Review.

== Early life and education ==
Higginson was born on April 12, 1961, in Boston, Massachusetts. He graduated from the Groton School in 1979, then studied government and English literature at Harvard University, graduating in 1983 with a Bachelor of Arts, summa cum laude. After earning an M.Phil. from the University of Cambridge the following year, he enrolled in Yale Law School, where he was editor-in-chief of The Yale Law Journal. He graduated in 1987 with a Juris Doctor.

== Legal career ==
After graduating from law school, Higginson was a law clerk for Chief Judge Patricia Wald of the U.S. Court of Appeals for the District of Columbia Circuit from 1987 to 1988 and for Justice Byron White of the U.S. Supreme Court from 1988 to 1989.

Following his clerkships, Higginson became an assistant U.S. attorney in the criminal section of the U.S. Attorney's Office for the District of Massachusetts. In 1993, he moved to the Eastern District of Louisiana, and became chief of appeals in 1995. From 2004 to 2011, he worked part-time as a prosecutor, continuing to supervise the appellate section. In 2004, he became a full-time faculty member at Loyola University New Orleans College of Law. He taught criminal procedure, constitutional law and evidence. Higginson is an elected member of the American Law Institute.

== Federal judicial service ==
On May 5, 2011, President Barack Obama announced his intent to nominate Higginson to a seat on the United States Court of Appeals for the Fifth Circuit and submitted the nomination to the Senate on May 9. Senator Mary Landrieu had recommended Higginson to Obama in November 2010. The Senate confirmed Higginson's nomination by an 88–0 vote on October 31, 2011. Higginson received his commission on November 2, 2011, and filled the seat vacated by Judge Jacques L. Wiener Jr., who assumed senior status in 2010. On February 25, 2021, Higginson was appointed to the United States Foreign Intelligence Surveillance Court of Review by Chief Justice John Roberts.

In 2016, Higginson began writing separately in criminal appeals under plain-error review to note that the Fifth Circuit had been misapplying the plain-error standard and subjecting defendants to a higher burden on appeal by requiring them to prove a district court's plain error "would shock the conscience of the common man." In 2018, the U.S. Supreme Court agreed with Higginson and unanimously reversed a Fifth Circuit decision applying this shock-the-conscience standard, which the Court called "unduly restrictive." On April 26, 2022, Higginson dissented when the 5th Circuit officially rejected challenges to Texas SB 8, a law banning abortion within the state after six weeks gestational age and allows private individuals, or "bounty hunters", to sue anyone who performed or helped a woman get an abortion after six weeks. Judge Higginson agreed with the majority opinion, but, in light of a Supreme Court determination, would remand the case.

== Personal ==
Higginson is married to Collette Creppell, the Vice President of Campus Planning and Design at Chapman University. The couple has three children and lives in New Orleans.

== Selected scholarly works ==
- Higginson, Stephen A. (1986). "A Short History of the Right to Petition Government for the Redress of Grievances". The Yale Law Journal. 96 (1): 142–66. doi:10.2307/796438.
- — (2008). "Constitutional Advocacy Explains Constitutional Outcomes". Florida Law Review. 60 (4): 857–94.
- — (2009). "The Unworkability Imperative in Criminal Justice Rule-Making". Loyola Law Review. 55 (2): 249–76.

== See also ==
- List of law clerks for the sixth seat of the Supreme Court of the United States

Legal offices
Preceded by Jacques L. Wiener Jr.	Judge of the United States Court of Appeals for the Fifth Circuit; 2011–present	Incumbent
Preceded by Richard C. Tallman	Judge of the United States Foreign Intelligence Surveillance Court of Review; 2021–present	Incumbent
