= Jacques L. Wiener Jr. =

American judge (born 1934)

Jacques Wiener

Senior Judge of the United States Court of Appeals for the Fifth Circuit
- Incumbent
- Assumed office September 30, 2010

Judge of the United States Court of Appeals for the Fifth Circuit
- In office March 12, 1990 – September 30, 2010
- Appointed by: George H. W. Bush
- Preceded by: Robert Madden Hill
- Succeeded by: Stephen A. Higginson

Personal details
- Born: Jacques Loeb Wiener Jr. October 2, 1934 (age 90); Shreveport, Louisiana, U.S.
- Education: Tulane University (BA, JD)

Jacques Loeb Wiener Jr. (born October 2, 1934) is a Senior United States Federal Judge of the United States Court of Appeals, Fifth Circuit in New Orleans, Louisiana.

== Education and career ==
Wiener graduated from Tulane University with a Bachelor of Arts degree in 1956. After serving as an officer in the United States Navy, he attended Tulane University Law School, where he was editor in chief of the law review. Wiener received his Juris Doctor in 1961, graduating first in his class. He then entered private practice in Shreveport, specializing in estates, trusts, and taxation.

== Federal judicial service ==
Wiener was nominated by President George H. W. Bush on November 17, 1989, to a seat on the United States Court of Appeals for the Fifth Circuit that had been vacated by Judge Robert Madden Hill. He was confirmed by the United States Senate, members of the 101st United States Congress, on March 9, 1990, and received commission on March 12, 1990. He assumed senior status on September 30, 2010.

== Notable cases ==
On August 9, 2019, Wiener joined an opinion written by James L. Dennis that held the Indian Child Welfare Act (ICWA) is constitutional. This ruling was affirmed in part and reversed in part when the 5th circuit went en banc. Wiener was part of the en banc panel and dissented from the parts that struck down portions of the ICWA.

On December 21, 2020, and again on September 9, 2021 (en banc), Wiener dissented when the 5th Circuit ruled that an oil company supervisor already making $200,000 a year was entitled to overtime pay. Wiener stated "Frankly, I cannot fathom how a majority of the active judges of this court can vote to require Helix to pay overtime to Hewitt, the supervisor of 12 to 13 hourly, hands-on workers, when he was already paid more than twice the cap of $100,000 per annum for overtime eligibility. And, if that is not incomprehensible enough, keep in mind that Hewitt worked for Helix no more than half of the days during the calendar years at issue!" Wiener's dissent in the en banc case was joined by four other judges. The Supreme Court affirmed the majority's decision by a vote of 6–3 in Helix Energy Solutions Group, Inc. v. Hewitt.

In October 2023, Wiener refused to lift a consent decree that ensured Louisiana's compliance with Section 2 of the Voting Rights Act. On August 29, 2024, Wiener dissented from the 5th circuit's en banc ruling lifting the consent decree. Wiener wrote that Louisiana had not provided evidence of compliance with the decree and pointed out that Louisiana had refused to commit to keeping a majority-minority district after the decree's dissolution.

Legal offices
Preceded by Robert Madden Hill	Judge of the United States Court of Appeals for the Fifth Circuit; 1990–2010	Succeeded by Stephen A. Higginson
