= Eric D. Miller =

American judge (born 1975)

Eric Miller
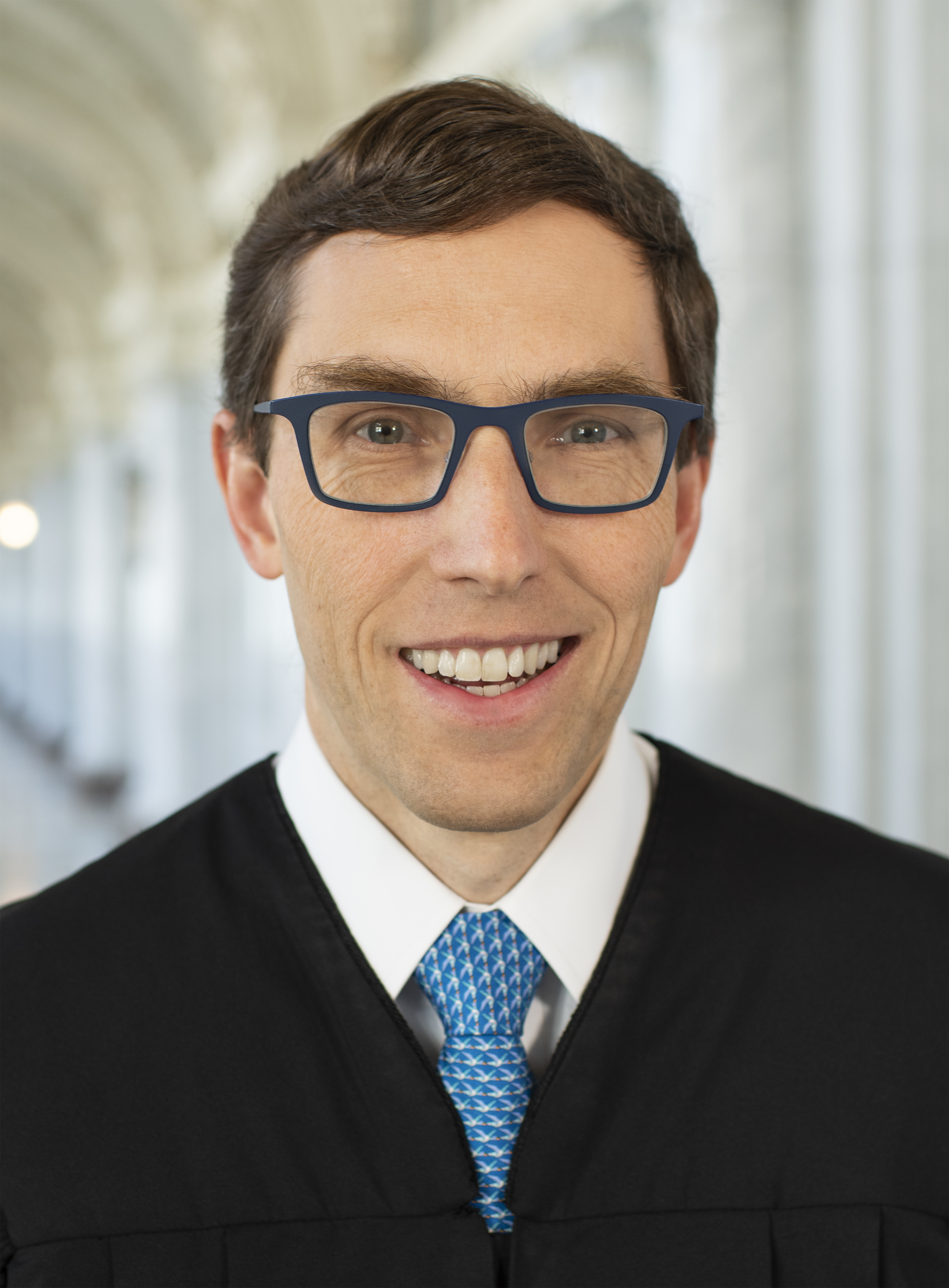
- Miller in 2019

Judge of the United States Court of Appeals for the Ninth Circuit
- Incumbent
- Assumed office March 4, 2019
- Appointed by: Donald Trump
- Preceded by: Richard C. Tallman

Personal details
- Born: Eric David Miller; 1975 (age 50–51) Oak Park, Illinois, U.S.
- Education: Harvard University (BA); University of Chicago (JD)

Eric David Miller (born 1975) is an American attorney and jurist serving as a United States circuit judge of the United States Court of Appeals for the Ninth Circuit.

== Early life and education ==
Miller was born in Oak Park, Illinois and grew up in Marin County, California. He studied physics at Harvard University, graduating in 1996 with a Bachelor of Arts, magna cum laude. He then attended the University of Chicago Law School, where he served as a topics and comments editor of the University of Chicago Law Review and graduated in 1999 with a Juris Doctor with highest honors and Order of the Coif membership.

== Career ==
After law school, Miller served as a law clerk to Judge Laurence Silberman of the United States Court of Appeals for the District of Columbia Circuit from 1999 to 2000 and to Justice Clarence Thomas of the United States Supreme Court from 2000 to 2001.

Early in his career, Miller served in the United States Department of Justice as an Attorney-Advisor in the Office of Legal Counsel (2003–2004) and as a member of the Appellate Staff in the Civil Division (2001–2003, 2004–2006). Miller also served as Deputy General Counsel of the Federal Communications Commission (2006–2007) and spent five years (2007–2012) as an Assistant to the Solicitor General in the Office of the Solicitor General within the Department of Justice. He received the Attorney General's Distinguished Service Award in 2008 for his work on national security litigation.

Before becoming a judge, Miller was a partner at Perkins Coie from 2012 to 2019 in the firm's Seattle office. In that capacity, he served as the firm-wide chair of Perkins Coie's appellate practice.

Miller is also a part-time lecturer at the University of Washington School of Law. He has argued more than 60 appeals, including 16 before the Supreme Court of the United States.

== Federal judicial service ==
On July 13, 2018, President Donald Trump announced his intent to nominate Miller to serve as a United States Circuit Judge of the United States Court of Appeals for the Ninth Circuit. On July 19, 2018, his nomination was sent to the Senate. President Trump nominated Miller to the seat vacated by Judge Richard C. Tallman, who assumed senior status on March 3, 2018. On October 24, 2018, while the Senate was not in session, a hearing on his nomination was held before the Senate Judiciary Committee with only two Republican Senators present, not the Chair, and no Democrats.

On January 3, 2019, his nomination was returned to the President under Rule XXXI, Paragraph 6 of the United States Senate. On January 23, 2019, President Trump announced his intent to renominate Miller for a federal judgeship. His nomination was sent to the Senate later that day. On February 7, 2019, his nomination was reported out of committee by a 12–10 vote. On February 25, 2019, the Senate invoked cloture on his nomination by a 51–46 vote, and on the following day, voted to confirm him by a 53–46 vote. He received his judicial commission on March 4, 2019.

His appointment was noteworthy as his home state senators (Patty Murray and Maria Cantwell, of Washington) did not support his nomination and refused to return their blue slips in order to show their objection to it. He was the first federal judicial nominee to be so confirmed.

On April 7, 2020, Miller joined an opinion written by Milan Smith ruling that aliens detained for six months or more must be granted bond hearings.

On August 14, 2020, Miller wrote an opinion joined by Susan P. Graber and Andrew D. Hurwitz holding that an asylum applicant does not have the ability to “relocate” within her home country if she would have to remain in hiding there. The panel also concluded that “women resistant to forced marriage proposals” are a socially distinct group in Cameroonian society and, accordingly, may be able to demonstrate a well-founded fear of persecution based on that protected ground.

On January 15, 2021, Miller joined an opinion authored by Kim McLane Wardlaw holding that a plaintiff can sue a police officer under section 1983 based on a Miranda violation. The Supreme Court overturned that decision in Vega v. Tekoh with a 6-3 vote on June 23, 2022, with Justice Samuel Alito writing for the majority. Justice Elena Kagan dissented, joined by Justices Stephen Breyer and Sonia Sotomayor, at one point quoting Miller’s concurrence in the Ninth Circuit’s denial of rehearing en banc, writing, “As one judge below put it: ‘Miranda indisputably creates individual legal rights that are judicially enforceable. (Any prosecutor who doubts this can try to introduce an un-Mirandized confession and then watch what happens.)’”

On November 13, 2023, Miller voted against temporarily blocking Idaho's abortion ban despite its lack of exceptions for medical emergencies. A 7-4 majority voted to temporarily block the ban. On January 5, 2024, the Supreme Court said it would take up the case and dissolved the 9th circuit's temporary injunction.

Miller was a member of the Federalist Society from 1996 to 1999, 2000–2004 and 2016–2017.

== See also ==
- Donald Trump judicial appointment controversies
- List of law clerks for the tenth seat of the Supreme Court of the United States

== Selected publications ==
- Miller, Eric D. (1998). "Should Courts Consider 18 USC Section 3501 Sua Sponte?". University of Chicago Law Review. 65 (3): 1029–1058. doi:10.2307/1600306. JSTOR 1600306.

Legal offices
Preceded by Richard C. Tallman	Judge of the United States Court of Appeals for the Ninth Circuit; 2019–present	Incumbent
