= David B. Sentelle =

American judge (born 1943)

David Sentelle
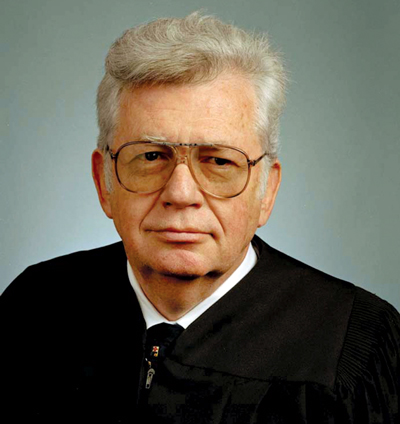
- Official portrait, c. 2000

Presiding Judge of the United States Foreign Intelligence Surveillance Court of Review
- In office May 19, 2020 – September 15, 2023
- Appointed by: John Roberts
- Preceded by: José A. Cabranes
- Succeeded by: Stephen A. Higginson

Judge of the United States Foreign Intelligence Surveillance Court of Review
- In office May 19, 2018 – September 15, 2023
- Appointed by: John Roberts
- Preceded by: William Curtis Bryson
- Succeeded by: Timothy Tymkovich

Senior Judge of the United States Court of Appeals for the District of Columbia Circuit
- Incumbent
- Assumed office February 12, 2013

Chief Judge of the United States Court of Appeals for the District of Columbia Circuit
- In office February 11, 2008 – February 12, 2013
- Preceded by: Douglas H. Ginsburg
- Succeeded by: Merrick Garland

Judge of the United States Court of Appeals for the District of Columbia Circuit
- In office September 11, 1987 – February 12, 2013
- Appointed by: Ronald Reagan
- Preceded by: Antonin Scalia
- Succeeded by: Robert L. Wilkins

Judge of the United States District Court for the Western District of North Carolina
- In office October 17, 1985 – October 19, 1987
- Appointed by: Ronald Reagan
- Preceded by: Woodrow W. Jones
- Succeeded by: Richard Lesley Voorhees

Personal details
- Born: David Bryan Sentelle; February 12, 1943 (age 83) Canton, North Carolina, U.S.
- Party: Republican
- Education: University of North Carolina, Chapel Hill (BA, JD)

David Bryan Sentelle (born February 12, 1943) is a Senior United States circuit judge of the United States Court of Appeals for the District of Columbia Circuit. He previously was a U.S. district judge on the United States District Court for the Western District of North Carolina from 1985 to 1987.

== Early life, family and education ==
David Sentelle was born in Canton, North Carolina. His father was a mill worker. Sentelle was raised in Candler, North Carolina. He graduated from Enka High School in 1961, where he was a classmate of Thomas A. Furness III, who is the "Grandfather of Virtual Reality."

Sentelle received a Bachelor of Arts degree from the University of North Carolina at Chapel Hill in 1965. He received a Juris Doctor degree from the University of North Carolina School of Law in 1968.

== Career ==
Sentelle practiced law as an associate attorney with the firm Uzzell & Dumont in Asheville, North Carolina, from 1968 to 1970. He was an Assistant United States Attorney in Charlotte, North Carolina, from 1970 to 1974.

Sentelle served as a Mecklenburg Country District Court Judge from 1974 to 1977. He stepped down from the bench in 1977 to become a partner with the law firm of Tucker, Hicks, Sentelle, Moon & Hodge in Charlotte until his appointment to the U.S. District Court for the Western District of North Carolina in 1985.

In addition to his practice and judicial service, Sentelle has held several teaching positions. He was a visiting professor at the University of North Carolina at Charlotte in 1977. He was a visiting professor at the University of North Carolina at Chapel Hill from 1991 to 1992. In 1993, he taught as an adjunct professor at Florida State University College of Law. Sentelle was an adjunct professor at the George Mason School of Law from 2002 to 2009.

Sentelle is also a founding member and was the longtime president of the Edward Bennett Williams Inn of the American Inns of Court, one of D.C.'s most prestigious associations of white-collar prosecutors and defense attorneys. He won the 2008 American Inns of Court professionalism award in recognition of his service to the Inn.

== Federal judicial service ==
With support from Senator Jesse Helms, Sentelle was nominated by President Ronald Reagan on July 25, 1985, to a seat on the United States District Court for the Western District of North Carolina vacated by Judge Woodrow W. Jones. He was confirmed by the United States Senate on October 16, 1985, and received his commission on October 17, 1985. His service was terminated on October 19, 1987, due to elevation to the court of appeals.

Sentelle was nominated by President Reagan on February 2, 1987, to the seat on the U.S. Court of Appeals for the D.C. Circuit vacated by Judge Antonin Scalia, who was elevated to the U.S. Supreme Court. Sentelle was confirmed by the Senate by a 87–0 vote on September 9, 1987. He received his commission on September 11, 1987; and entered into service on October 19, 1987. He served as Chief Judge from 2008 to 2013. He assumed senior status on February 12, 2013 and inactive senior status in 2023. During his time on the D.C. Circuit, Sentelle served with five future Supreme Court justices: Ruth Bader Ginsburg, Clarence Thomas, John Roberts, Brett Kavanaugh, and Ketanji Brown Jackson. In addition, many of his law clerks went on to clerk for Supreme Court justices, earning Sentelle a reputation as a "feeder judge."

From 1992 to 2006, Sentelle served as the presiding judge of the Division of the D.C. Circuit for the Appointment of Independent Counsel. During his tenure, the division appointed Kenneth Starr to replace Robert B. Fiske who had been appointed by Attorney General Janet Reno to investigate the allegations against President Bill Clinton with respect to the Whitewater Affair.

Sentelle was appointed to the United States Foreign Intelligence Surveillance Court of Review (FISCR) on May 19, 2018, and became the presiding judge of that court on May 20, 2020.

In addition to his work on the D.C. Circuit and the FISCR, Sentelle served as a member of the Executive Committee of the Judicial Conference from 2008 to 2013, and as the chair of that committee from 2010 to 2013.

Several of Sentelle's former law clerks have gone onto become judges themselves. Neil Gorsuch (1991–1992) serves as an associate justice of the U.S. Supreme Court. Joan Larsen (1993-1994, 6th Cir.), Allison Jones Rushing (2008-2009, 4th Cir.), Beth Robinson (1989-1990, 2nd Cir.), and Andrew Oldham (2005-2006, 5th Cir.) currently serve as Circuit Court Judges. (President Trump considered nominating both Larsen and Rushing for the Supreme Court seat currently occupied by Justice Amy Coney Barrett, while Robinson is the first openly gay judge on the federal appellate bench.) Liam P. Hardy (2010–2011) is a judge on the U.S. Court of Appeals for the Armed Forces. Steven C. Seeger (1997-1998, N.D. Ill.), Richard E. Myers II (1998-1999, E.D.N.C.), and Frank DeArmon Whitney (1988-1989, W.D.N.C.) currently serve as U.S. District Judges. Adam Conrad (2005–2006) serves on the North Carolina Business Court. David E. Jones (1991–1992) formerly served as a U.S. Magistrate Judge in the Eastern District of Wisconsin.

Other Sentelle clerks have gone on to serve as executive branch officials. Kristen Silverberg (1998–1999) served as the ambassador to the E.U. Maureen Ohlhausen (1994–1995) served as a member and acting chair of the Federal Trade Commission. Nathan Sales (2000-01) served as under secretary of state for civilian security, democracy, and human rights and the State Department coordinator for counterterrorism in the first Trump Administration.

Still other Sentelle clerks have become academics, including Jonathan H. Adler at William & Mary, Adam White at George Mason University, Nathan Sales at Syracuse, and Stephen F. Smith at Notre Dame.

== Notable cases ==
While on the D.C. Circuit, Sentelle was part of two three-judge panels that overturned the convictions of Oliver North and John Poindexter. On the North panel, Sentelle and Judge Laurence Silberman voted to overturn North's conviction while Chief Judge Patricia Wald dissented. On the Poindexter panel, Sentelle and Judge Douglas H. Ginsburg voted to overturn the conviction with Judge Abner J. Mikva dissenting.

In 1994, during his tenure as the presiding judge of the Division of the D.C. Circuit for the Appointment of Independent Counsel, the division controversially appointed Kenneth Starr to replace Robert B. Fiske, who had been appointed by Attorney General Janet Reno, to investigate the allegations against President Bill Clinton with respect to the Whitewater Affair.

In Cobell v. Norton, 240 F.3d 1081 (D.C. Cir. 2001), Sentelle (joined by Judges Stephen Williams and Judith Rogers) largely affirmed the District Court's finding that the federal government had mismanaged Indian trust funds. The government ultimately settled the case—one of the largest class actions in history—in 2009.

In 2007, in Boumediene v. Bush, 375 U.S. App. D.C. 48, Sentelle concurred with Judge Arthur Raymond Randolph, relying on Johnson v. Eisentrager to uphold the Military Commissions Act of 2006's suspension of habeas corpus for enemy combatants as constitutional. Judge Rogers dissented. That decision was reversed by the U.S. Supreme Court.

In 2004, New York Times reporter Judith Miller refused to comply with a grand jury subpoena seeking documents and testimony about her conversations with a confidential source. Because of her noncompliance, the District Court held Miller in civil contempt and she spent 85 days in jail. In In re Grand Jury Subpoena, Judith Miller, 397 F.3d 964 (D.C. Cir. 2005), Sentelle (joined by Judges Karen Henderson and David Tatel) affirmed Miller's conviction, though the three judges disagreed about the existence and scope of a reporter's common-law privilege to resist grand jury subpoenas.

In National Labor Relations Board v. Noel Canning, Sentelle (with Judges Henderson and Thomas Griffith) held that President Obama's extensive use of recess appointments violated the Constitution, clarifying the President's limited Article II authority to fill judicial and executive appointments during inter-session recesses. The Supreme Court unanimously affirmed, though a majority of justices declined to adopt Sentelle's precise constitutional rationale.

== Personal life ==
Sentelle served as a delegate to the 1984 Republican National Convention. He previously published several works of crime fiction under the pseudonym Clyde Haywood.

Sentelle is a Freemason. He is a recipient of the Joseph Montfort Medal from the Grand Lodge of North Carolina.

== Publications ==
- Sentelle, David B. (2002). Judge Dave and the Rainbow People. Green Bag Press, Washington D.C. ISBN 0-9677568-3-9

== Sources ==
- Judge Sentelle's Complete Oral History: Complete Oral History Package of David B. Sentelle
- Transcript of Judge Sentelle's D.C. Circuit Portrait Presentation Ceremony:

Legal offices
Preceded by Woodrow W. Jones	Judge of the United States District Court for the Western District of North Carolina; 1985–1987	Succeeded by Richard Lesley Voorhees
Preceded by Antonin Scalia	Judge of the United States Court of Appeals for the District of Columbia Circuit; 1987–2013	Succeeded by Robert L. Wilkins
Preceded by Douglas H. Ginsburg	Chief Judge of the United States Court of Appeals for the District of Columbia Circuit; 2008–2013	Succeeded by Merrick Garland
Preceded by William Curtis Bryson	Judge of the United States Foreign Intelligence Surveillance Court of Review; 2018–2023	Succeeded by Timothy Tymkovich
Preceded by José A. Cabranes	Presiding Judge of the United States Foreign Intelligence Surveillance Court of Review; 2020–2023	Succeeded by Stephen A. Higginson
