= José A. Cabranes =

Puerto Rican judge (born 1940)

José Cabranes
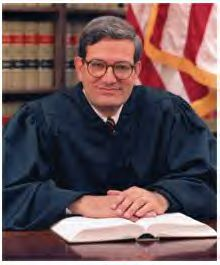

Senior Judge of the United States Court of Appeals for the Second Circuit
- Incumbent
- Assumed office March 9, 2023

Presiding Judge of the United States Foreign Intelligence Surveillance Court of Review
- In office May 19, 2018 – May 18, 2020
- Preceded by: William Curtis Bryson
- Succeeded by: David B. Sentelle

Judge of the United States Foreign Intelligence Surveillance Court of Review
- In office August 9, 2013 – May 18, 2020
- Appointed by: John Roberts
- Preceded by: Bruce M. Selya
- Succeeded by: Robert Lowell Miller Jr.

Judge of the United States Court of Appeals for the Second Circuit
- In office August 10, 1994 – March 9, 2023
- Appointed by: Bill Clinton
- Preceded by: Richard J. Cardamone
- Succeeded by: Maria Araújo Kahn

Chief Judge of the United States District Court for the District of Connecticut
- In office September 1, 1992 – August 12, 1994
- Preceded by: Ellen Bree Burns
- Succeeded by: Peter Collins Dorsey

Judge of the United States District Court for the District of Connecticut
- In office December 10, 1979 – August 12, 1994
- Appointed by: Jimmy Carter
- Preceded by: Jon O. Newman
- Succeeded by: Janet Bond Arterton

Director of the Puerto Rico Federal Affairs Administration
- In office 1973–1975
- Governor: Rafael Hernández Colón
- Preceded by: Joaquín Márquez
- Succeeded by: José Ortiz Dalliot

Personal details
- Born: José Alberto Cabranes; December 22, 1940 (age 85) Mayagüez, Puerto Rico
- Education: Columbia University (BA); Yale University (JD); Queens' College, Cambridge (MLitt)

José Alberto Cabranes (born December 22, 1940) is an American lawyer who serves as a senior United States circuit judge of the United States Court of Appeals for the Second Circuit and a former presiding judge of the United States Foreign Intelligence Surveillance Court of Review ("FISCR"). Formerly a practicing lawyer, government official, and law teacher, he was the first Puerto Rican appointed to a federal judgeship in the continental United States (1979).

== Early life and education ==
Cabranes was born in Mayagüez, Puerto Rico, on December 22, 1940, into a family of educators; both his mother and father were school teachers. Both parents were educated in Puerto Rico's public schools and at the then newly founded University of Puerto Rico in the first decades of the 20th century, part of the first generation of Puerto Ricans educated under the American flag after Spain's transfer of the island to the United States following the Spanish–American War (1898).

Cabranes moved to The Bronx, New York at the age of 5, when his father, one of Puerto Rico’s first professionally trained social workers, serving as Chief Probation Officer of the U.S. District Court for the District of Puerto Rico, was recruited by the National Council of Jewish Women to serve as Director of Melrose House, a settlement house in the South Bronx that had historically served Jewish newcomers and increasingly devoted its efforts to aid Puerto Ricans who, as United States citizens, were part of a massive migration by air to New York. In the South Bronx Cabranes attended the Roman Catholic St. Anselm’s School; later, living in Flushing, Queens, he attended the New York public schools.

José Cabranes graduated from Flushing High School in 1957 and earned a Bachelor of Arts degree in history from Columbia College in 1961. Between college and law school at Yale, he taught History of Puerto Rico and History of the United States at the Colegio San Ignacio de Loyola, in Rio Piedras, Puerto Rico. He earned his Juris Doctor from Yale in 1965 and was awarded a Kellett Research Fellowship from Columbia College and the Humanitarian Trust Studentship in Public International Law from the Faculty Board of Law of the University of Cambridge to study international law at Queens' College. In 1967, he earned his Master of Letters in International Law, and returned to New York City to practice law.

== Legal and academic career ==
Cabranes was an associate in the New York City law firm of Casey, Lane & Mittendorf (now dissolved) from 1967 to 1971, and became avocationally active in public affairs and the civic life of the Puerto Rican community of New York. In the early 1970s he served as a trustee of the Hudson Guild settlement house, in the Chelsea area of Manhattan, and as a director of Citizens Union, a "good government" civic group first organized in the early 20th century. In 1971 he became chairman of the Board of Directors of ASPIRA of New York, an organization that helps inner-city Hispanic youth prepare for higher education, and he was a founding member of the board of directors of the Puerto Rican Legal Defense and Education Fund, of which he was later (1975–1980) Chairman.

In 1971, Cabranes left law practice to become associate professor of law at Rutgers University Law School, in Newark, where he taught administrative law, conflicts of law and international law. While at Rutgers Law School he continued to live in New York City, and in 1971 was appointed by Mayor John V. Lindsay as a member of the board of directors of a newly created public corporation, the New York City Health and Hospitals Corporation.

In 1973, Cabranes took a leave of absence from Rutgers Law School to accept appointment by the Governor of Puerto Rico, Rafael Hernández-Colón, as Special Counsel to the Governor and head of the Commonwealth's Washington office (later known as the Puerto Rico Federal Affairs Administration).

In 1975, he moved to New Haven, when he was appointed by Yale's President, Kingman Brewster, Jr., as Yale's first general counsel. He served as Yale's general counsel also under Acting President Hanna Holborn Gray (later President of the University of Chicago) and President A. Bartlett Giamatti.

While general counsel of Yale University, from 1975 to 1980, Cabranes served in a number of part-time public positions, including as a Public Member of the United States Delegation to the Conference on Security and Cooperation in Europe (Belgrade, 1977–1978) and as Consultant to Secretary of State Cyrus R. Vance (1977–1978). He was elected a member of the Council on Foreign Relations, and published a legislative history of the 1917 law that collectively conferred American citizenship of the people of Puerto Rico, Citizenship and the American Empire (Yale University Press, 1978).

President Jimmy Carter appointed Cabranes as one of the lay members of the President's Commission on Mental Health, chaired by Rosalynn Carter (1977–1979), and President Carter was reported to have been ready to appoint him to an ambassadorial position. Cabranes's refusal to accept appointment as Ambassador to Colombia, after the Colombian government's initial hesitation to accept a Puerto Rican as the American envoy, led to a political firestorm and charges by national Hispanic leaders of the White House's mismanagement of an appointment they had supported.

== Federal judicial service ==
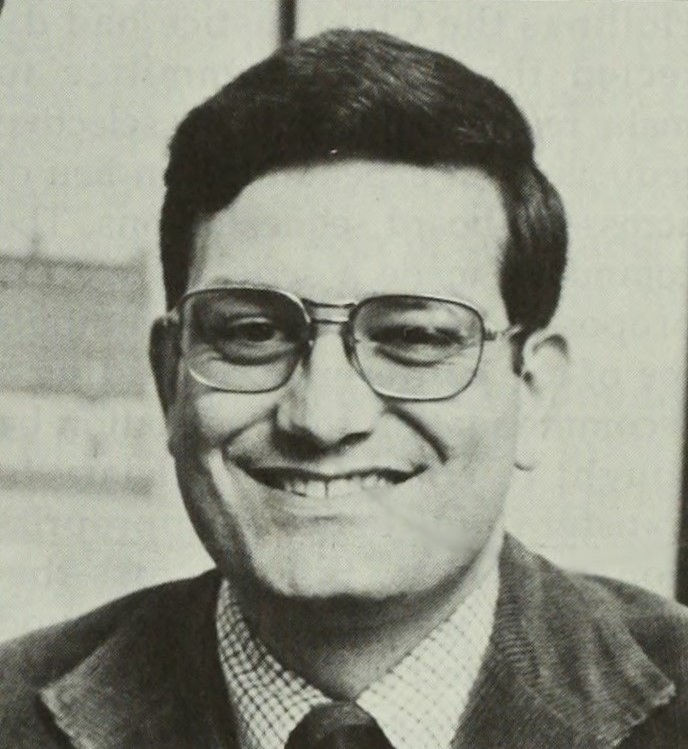
Cabranes in 1986.

In 1979, Cabranes was in the unusual position of being seriously considered for a federal district judgeship in two different states, New York and Connecticut. Both Senators Daniel Patrick Moynihan of New York and Abraham Ribicoff of Connecticut were reported to have offered to recommend his appointment to President Carter.

Eventually opting for Connecticut, Cabranes accepted the offer of sponsorship of Senator Abraham A. Ribicoff. President Jimmy Carter nominated Cabranes on November 6, 1979, to the United States District Court for the District of Connecticut. Cabranes was unanimously confirmed on December 10, 1979, thus becoming the first Puerto Rican to serve as a federal judge in the continental United States. He received his commission on December 10, 1979. His service as a district court judge was terminated on August 12, 1994, when he was elevated to the United States Court of Appeals for the Second Circuit.

While serving on the District Court, Cabranes was elected by the Judicial Conference of the United States to the Board of the Federal Judicial Center, the educational arm of the federal judiciary whose chairman is the Chief Justice of the United States. In 1988, Chief Justice Rehnquist named Cabranes as one of five federal judges on the Federal Courts Study Committee, a fifteen-member commission created by Act of Congress to study the administration of the federal courts.

In 1994, it was Senator Moynihan who made possible Cabranes's elevation to the United States Court of Appeals. Moynihan recommended Cabranes for a New York seat on that Court and on May 24, 1994, President Bill Clinton nominated him to serve on the United States Court of Appeals for the Second Circuit, based in New York. His nomination was confirmed unanimously by the U.S. Senate on August 9, 1994. Cabranes thus became the second Puerto Rican named to a U.S. Court of Appeals, after Juan R. Torruella who had been appointed by Ronald Reagan in 1984 to the First Circuit. Cabranes also became the first Hispanic judge to serve on the Second Circuit. He received his commission on August 10, 1994.

Contemporary news accounts reported that in 1993 Cabranes was considered by President Clinton for appointment to the seat on the Supreme Court of the United States that ultimately went to Ruth Bader Ginsburg. Had he been appointed, Cabranes would have been the first Hispanic Supreme Court justice. These reports are confirmed in the memoir of former Clinton administration adviser George Stephanopoulos, All Too Human: A Political Education. Newspaper accounts in 1994 likewise reported that Cabranes was considered for the vacancy created by the retirement of Justice Harry Blackmun, which ultimately was filled by Stephen Breyer.

On August 9, 2013, Cabranes was designated by the Chief Justice of the United States to a seven-year term as one of the three judges on the Foreign Intelligence Surveillance Court of Review.

Throughout his judicial career, Cabranes's principal avocational activity has been university trusteeship, including the boards of the two American universities of which he is an alumnus. He served as a trustee of Colgate University, in Hamilton, New York, from 1981 to 1989, and as a successor trustee of Yale (Fellow of the Yale Corporation), from 1987-1999. He was the first Roman Catholic to serve on the Yale Corporation. From 2000 to 2012, he was a trustee of Columbia University.

Cabranes is considered to be a moderate conservative, despite being appointed by a Democrat. Some people suggested that Bush nominate him to the Supreme Court.

After Joel Flaum and Stephen Breyer assumed senior status, Cabranes became the longest-serving active federal judge and the last judge continuously in active service from the presidency of Jimmy Carter. In October 2021, he announced his intention to assume senior status upon confirmation of a successor. He assumed senior status on March 9, 2023.

== Notable rulings ==
The following decisions, among others, appear in the 2010 edition of the Almanac of the Federal Judiciary.

United States v. Gatlin, 216 F.3d 207 (2d Cir. 2000): Cabranes, writing for the panel in a matter of first appellate impression, held that the district court was without congressionally authorized jurisdiction to try a civilian charged with committing a crime against an individual on a United States military installation abroad. Cabranes concluded that such crimes fell within a "jurisdictional gap" that was created 40 years ago when the Supreme Court ruled that civilians may not be tried in courts martial, and directed that a copy of the opinion be forwarded to members of Congress for their consideration. Following the panel's decision, Congress enacted a statute remedying the jurisdictional gap.

In re United States (Coppa), 267 F.3d 132 (2d Cir. 2001): Cabranes, writing for the panel and granting the government's petition for mandamus, held that the district court misapplied the teachings of Brady v. Maryland, 373 U.S. 83 (1963) and its progeny in holding that the government was required, as a matter of constitutional law, to disclose all impeachment evidence immediately, pursuant to defendants' request for such, without regard to its materiality and far in advance of trial.

United States v. Thomas, 274 F.3d 655 (2d Cir. 2001) (en banc): Cabranes, writing for the unanimous en banc court, held that the teachings of the Supreme Court's decision in Apprendi v. New Jersey, 530 U.S. 466 (2000) compel the conclusion that drug type and quantity are elements of the offense under 21 U.S.C. §841 that must be charged in the indictment and submitted to the jury for its finding beyond a reasonable doubt.

United States v. Reyes, 283 F.3d 446 (2d Cir. 2002), cert. denied, 537 U.S. 833 (2002): Cabranes, writing for the panel, provided an account of the United States Probation Office functions and held that a probation officer conducting a court-imposed home visit of a convicted person serving a term of federal supervised release is not subject to the probable cause requirements of the Fourth Amendment or to the reasonable suspicion standard applicable to probation searches under United States v. Knight, 534 U.S. 112 (2001). Cabranes also concluded that, contrary to the so-called "stalking horse" theory, the law permits cooperation between probation officers and law enforcement personnel.

United States v. Quinones, 313 F.3d 49 (2d Cir. 2002), reh'g denied 317 F. 3d 86 (2d Cir. 2002), cert. denied, 540 U.S. 1051 (2003): Cabranes, writing for the panel, held that the district court erred by finding the Federal Death Penalty Act of 1994 unconstitutional. Cabranes held that, to the extent that the challenge against the statute relied upon the Eighth Amendment, it was foreclosed by the Supreme Court's decision in Gregg v. Georgia, 428 U.S. 153 (1976). With respect to the Due Process Clause, Cabranes held that it protected against government infringement upon rights that were so rooted in the traditions and conscience of the people as to be ranked as fundamental, but that the claim that there was a fundamental right to a continued opportunity for exoneration throughout the course of one's natural life was not (as the district court had suggested) a novel issue, and indeed, was foreclosed by relevant Supreme Court precedents.

United States v. Yousef, 327 F.3d 56 (2d Cir. 2003), cert. denied 540 U.S. 933 (2003): Cabranes, writing jointly with other members of the panel, held that the district court erroneously concluded that the acts charged in one of the counts against the defendant were offenses against the law of nations that supported the exercise of universal jurisdiction. Cabranes concluded that customary international law currently does not provide for the prosecution of "terrorist" acts under the universality principle, in part due to the failure of States to achieve anything like consensus on the definition of terrorism. Cabranes nonetheless held that prosecution and conviction of the defendant on the count in question was both consistent with and required by the United States' treaty obligations and domestic laws.

Flores v. Southern Peru Copper Corporation, 343 F.3d 140 (2d Cir. 2003): Cabranes, writing for the panel, held that customary international law, for the violation of which an alien has a private right of action under Alien Tort Claims Act, 28 U.S.C. § 1350, is limited to those clear and unambiguous rules by which states universally abide, or to which they accede, out of a sense of legal obligation and mutual concern. Cabranes concluded that the rights to life and health are insufficiently definite to constitute rules of customary international law and that plaintiffs, who alleged that Peruvian operations of an American mining company had caused severe lung disease, have not submitted evidence sufficient to establish that customary international law prohibits intranational pollution.

Church of the American Knights of the Ku Klux Klan v. Kerik, 356 F.3d 197 (2d Cir. 2004), cert. denied 125 S. Ct. 655 (2004): Cabranes, writing for the panel, upheld New York's anti-mask statute against constitutional challenge, holding that masks worn by self-described members of an "unincorporated political membership association that advocates on behalf of the white race and the Christian faith" did not constitute expressive conduct entitled to First Amendment protection. Cabranes concluded that where a statute banning conduct imposes a burden on the wearing of an element of an expressive uniform, which element has no independent or incremental expressive value, the first amendment is not implicated.

Jeffreys v. City of New York, 426 F.3d 549 (2d Cir. 2005): Cabranes, writing for the panel, affirmed a district court's dismissal of a suit alleging excessive force on the part of New York police officers. Cabranes held that, notwithstanding the general rule that district courts may not weigh evidence or assess the credibility of witnesses at the summary judgment stage, a district court may grant summary judgment where a plaintiff relies almost exclusively on his own testimony and that testimony is "so replete with inconsistencies and improbabilities" that no reasonable juror would undertake the suspension of disbelief necessary to credit he allegations made in the complaint.

Hayden v. Pataki, 449 F.3d 305 (2d Cir. 2006) (en banc): Cabranes, writing for a majority of the en banc court, held that section 2 of the Voting Rights Act of 1965, 42 U.S.C. § 1973, did not extend to a New York statute that disenfranchised currently incarcerated felons and parolees, N.Y. Elec. Law §5-106. Cabranes held that Congress did not intend to include prisoner disenfranchisement provisions of the type adopted by New York within the coverage of section 2 of the Voting Rights Act, and that Congress made no clear statement of an intent to modify the federal balance by applying the Voting Rights Act to these provisions.

Iqbal v. Hasty, 490 F.3d 143 (2d Cir. 2007): In a concurring opinion, Cabranes urged the Supreme Court to revisit and clarify its precedents on pleading standards in order to determine whether they strike the right balance between the need to deter unlawful conduct and the dangers of exposing public officials to burdensome litigation. The Supreme Court granted certiorari to consider the adequacy of the pleadings in this case. See Ashcroft v. Iqbal, 128 S.Ct. 2931 (2008).

Mora v. New York, 524 F.3d 183 (2d Cir. 2008): Cabranes, writing for a unanimous panel on a question of first impression, held that the requirement of Article 36 of the Vienna Convention on Consular Relations that a detained alien be informed of the availability of consular notification and access did not establish a right that could be vindicated in a civil rights action for damages. He also concluded that the detention of an alien without being informed of the availability of consular notification and access did not amount to a tort in violation of customary international law cognizable under the Alien Tort Statute.

Ricci v. DeStefano, 530 F.3d 88 (2d Cir 2008): In a dissenting opinion joined by five other members of the 13-member court, Cabranes objected to the perfunctory affirmance of an award of summary judgment to the defendants in a civil rights action. Cabranes dissented from the denial of en banc rehearing of this case, observing that the appeal raised important questions of first impression regarding the application of the Fourteenth Amendment's Equal Protection Clause and Title VII's prohibition on discriminatory employment practices-primarily, whether a city employer may disregard the results of a qualifying employment examination, which was carefully constructed to ensure race-neutrality, on the ground that the results of that examination yielded too many qualified applicants of one race and not enough of another. Cabranes urged the Supreme Court to consider the question, and the Supreme Court granted certiorari on January 9, 2009. The Supreme Court reviewed the decision to dismiss the suit, reversed it, and took the unusual step of granting judgment for the firefighters.

Arar v. Ashcroft, 532 F.3d 157 (2d Cir. 2008): In an action brought by a dual citizen of Canada and Syria arising from his alleged detention in the United States, transfer to Syria, and detention and torture in Syria, Cabranes, writing for a unanimous panel, held that the court had jurisdiction over the defendant government officials and that the plaintiff had failed to state a claim under the Torture Victim Prevention Act. Writing for the panel majority, Cabranes affirmed the dismissal of the plaintiff's claims brought under Bivens v. Six Unknown Federal Narcotics Agents, 403 U.S. 388 (1971), on the grounds that (1) an alternative remedial scheme precluded recognition of the claims, and (2) special factors counseled hesitation in creating a new and freestanding Bivens remedy.

In re Terrorist Bombings (Fourth Amendment Challenges), 552 F.3d 157 (2d Cir. 2008): Affirming the convictions of Al Qaeda terrorists for their involvement in the bombing of the American Embassies in Nairobi, Kenya and Dar es Salaam, Tanzania, Cabranes held, as a matter of first impression, that the Fourth Amendment's warrant requirement does not govern searches of U.S. citizens conducted abroad by U.S. agents; such searches need only satisfy the Fourth Amendment's requirement of reasonableness. Cabranes also held that a district court's ex parte, in camera evaluation of evidence submitted by the government in opposition to a suppression motion is appropriate when national security considerations weigh in favor of maintaining the confidentiality of that evidence.

In re Terrorist Bombings (Fifth Amendment Challenges) 552 F.3d 177 (2d Cir. 2008): Considering the motions to suppress statements made overseas to U.S. and non-U.S. officials by defendants convicted of participation in the bombing of American Embassies in East Africa, Cabranes held that oral warnings provided by a federal prosecutor were sufficient to apprise the defendants of their Miranda rights insofar as they had any such rights. In addition, Cabranes held that defendants' 14-day incommunicado detention in Kenyan custody did not render their post-warning statements involuntary and that, in order to reopen suppression proceedings, the government is not required to offer a reasonable justification for not having presented evidence at an earlier proceeding.

SEC v. Dorozhko, 574 F.3d 42 (2d Cir. 2009): Writing for a unanimous panel, Cabranes held that the United States Securities and Exchange Commission could sue a computer hacker under Section 10(b) of the Securities Exchange Act of 1934 even though the defendant was neither a fiduciary nor corporate insider, so long as the theory of fraud was an affirmative misrepresentation in connection with the purchase or sale of a security, rather than the violation of a duty to disclose the basis for a trade.

In re N.Y. Times Co., 577 F.3d 401 (2d Cir. 2009): Cabranes, writing for a unanimous panel, held that neither the First Amendment nor the common law right of access entitled the New York Times and other media companies to review wiretap applications that were sealed pursuant to a federal statute, where the media companies had not met the statutory threshold of "good cause." The wiretap applications were submitted and approved as part of a federal investigation of the "Emperor's Club," a prostitution ring linked to the former Governor of New York, Eliot Spitzer.

Henry v. Ricks, 578 F.3d 134 (2d Cir. 2009): Writing for a unanimous panel, Cabranes held that a ruling of the New York Court of Appeals that affected the elements of depraved indifference murder under New York law did not apply retroactively in a state prisoner's habeas petition. Notably, Cabranes held that the Due Process Clause did not require the retroactive application of a change in state criminal law.

United States v. Ray, 578 F.3d 184 (2d Cir. 2009): Considering a speedy-trial challenge to a sentence imposed 15 years after conviction, Cabranes, writing for a unanimous panel, held that the Speedy Trial Clause of the Sixth Amendment to the Constitution applies to trials only, not to sentencing proceedings. Although the Sixth Amendment was inapplicable to the appellant's sentencing, Cabranes held that the Due Process Clause of the Fifth Amendment did apply to sentencing proceedings. Because the 15-year delay in sentencing was not justified by any legitimate reason and was prejudicial, the sentence violated the Due Process Clause.

United States v. Rigas, 583 F.3d 108 (2d Cir. 2009): Writing for a unanimous panel, Cabranes upheld the sentences imposed on John J. Rigas and Timothy J. Rigas, the former CEO and CFO of Adelphia Communications Corp, which was among the largest U.S. cable companies before its collapse in an accounting scandal. Cabranes rejected arguments that the sentences were "substantively unreasonable," and described that standard as akin to a "manifest-injustice" or a "shocks-the-conscience" standard. In other words, wrote Cabranes, appellate review of the substance of a sentence "provide[s] a backstop for those few cases that, although procedurally correct, would nonetheless damage the administration of justice because the sentence imposed was shockingly high, shockingly low, or otherwise unsupportable as a matter of law."

Selevan v. New York Thruway Authority, 584 F.3d 82 (2d Cir. 2009): Cabranes, writing for a unanimous panel, held that plaintiffs, who challenged an interstate highway toll policy that afforded a discount to citizens of Grand Island, New York stated claims under several provisions of the Constitution, including the dormant Commerce Clause, the Equal Protection Clause, and the Privileges and Immunities Clause of the Fourteenth Amendment. Cabranes rejected the New York Thruway Authority's argument that its action was not subject to scrutiny under the dormant Commerce Clause because it was a "market participant," and the opinion established that dormant Commerce Clause challenges to highway toll policies must be analyzed under the factors set forth in the Supreme Court's opinion in Northwest Airlines, Inc. v. County of Kent, 510 U.S. 355, 369 (1994). Cabranes also held that one of the plaintiffs, who was a United States citizen residing in Canada, could not state a claim under the Privileges and Immunities Clause of Article IV, which, he explained, was designed to integrate the several states into coherent whole and did not afford protection to residents of foreign countries.

== Notable clerks ==
Notable former clerks of Judge Cabranes include:

- Boris Bershteyn, acting administrator of the Office of Information and Regulatory Affairs (2012–13)
- Lisa Schultz Bressman, professor, Vanderbilt University Law School (1998–present)
- Robert N. Chatigny, judge, District of Connecticut (1994–present)
- Michael Farbiarz, judge, District of New Jersey (2023–present)
- Jesse M. Furman, judge, Southern District of New York (2012–present)
- Robert S. Huie, judge, Southern District of California (2022–present)
- Bryan Leach, founder and CEO of Ibotta
- Carlos G. Muñiz, chief justice of the Supreme Court of Florida (2022–present)
- William J. Nardini, judge, Second Circuit (2019–present)

== Law reform work ==
Cabranes was elected to the American Law Institute in 1980 and became a Life Member of the Institute in 2005. He has served as an Adviser on the ALI's Principles of the Law of Charitable Nonprofit Organizations, the Restatement Fourth of the Law of Property, and the Restatement Fourth of the Foreign Relations Law of the United States.

== Notable publications and lectures ==
Cabranes is the author of Citizenship and The American Empire (Yale 1979), a legislative history of the United States citizenship of the people of Puerto Rico, and (with Kate Stith), Fear of Judging: Sentencing Guidelines in the Federal Courts (University of Chicago Press, 1998).

International Law by Consent of the Governed, 42 Valparaiso Law Review 119 (2007) (Indiana Supreme Court Lecture of 2006)

Myth and Reality of University Trusteeship in the Post-Enron Era, 76 Fordham Law Review 955 (2007) (The Robert L. Levine Distinguished Lecture of 2007)

Our Imperial Criminal Procedure: Problems in the Extraterritorial Application of U.S. Constitutional Law, 118 Yale Law Journal 1660 (2009) (The Charles Evans Hughes Memorial Lecture, New York County Lawyers' Association, 2008)

The Costs of Judging Judges by the Numbers, 28 Yale Law and Policy Review 313 (2010) (with Marin K. Levy and Kate Stith)

Customary International Law: What It Is and What It is Not, 22 Duke Journal of International and Comparative Law 143 (2011)

The Foreign Policy of Our Government’s “Least Dangerous Branch,” (The 2016 Leslie H. Arps Memorial Lecture, at the City Bar Association), Yale Journal of International Law (2016)

== Awards and recognition ==
Among the many awards received by Cabranes are the following:

- John Jay Award from Columbia University (1991)
- Connecticut Bar Association Henry J. Naruk Judiciary Award (1993)
- Gavel Award (Certificate of Merit) of the American Bar Association (1999)
- Federal Bar Council's Learned Hand Medal for Excellence in Federal Jurisprudence (2000)
- Edward J. Devitt Distinguished Service to Justice Award (2023)

He is recognized for being one of Supreme Court Justice Sonia Sotomayor's original mentors.

== Family ==
Cabranes's mother, Carmen López Cabranes, was born in Humacao, PR, in the southeastern part of the island, and graduated with a teaching degree from the University of Puerto Rico in 1930.

Cabranes's father, Manuel Cabranes, was born in Toa Alta, Puerto Rico, a rural town in the hills of the island's north-central region, and began his career as a rural school teacher in the countryside around Toa Alta. In time, he became a teacher in the island's capital city and principal of the Rafael M. de Labra School in Santurce, San Juan, Puerto Rico. He later served as a supervisor of social work in several of the reconstruction programs of the territorial government of the New Deal era (1934–1940), organizing and directing the territory's first program of probation and parole and later, in Mayaguez, serving as director of the Escuela Industrial Para Niños (Industrial School for Boys), one of the first "reform schools" on the island. In 1951, Manuel Cabranes began to serve in New York City Government, where he served as Consultant to the Commissioner of Welfare and was active in the civic life of New York's Puerto Rican community and a regular contributor on cultural affairs in the city's Spanish-language newspapers, El Diario de Nueva York and La Prensa.

== See also ==
- Bill Clinton Supreme Court candidates
- List of United States federal judges by longevity of service
- List of first minority male lawyers and judges in Connecticut
- List of first minority male lawyers and judges in the United States
- List of Hispanic and Latino American jurists
- List of Puerto Ricans

Legal offices
Preceded by Jon O. Newman	Judge of the United States District Court for the District of Connecticut; 1979–1994	Succeeded by Janet Bond Arterton
Preceded by Ellen Bree Burns	Chief Judge of the United States District Court for the District of Connecticut; 1992–1994	Succeeded by Peter Collins Dorsey
Preceded by Richard J. Cardamone	Judge of the United States Court of Appeals for the Second Circuit; 1994–2023	Succeeded by Maria Araújo Kahn
Preceded by Bruce M. Selya	Judge of the United States Foreign Intelligence Surveillance Court of Review; 2013–2020	Succeeded by Robert Lowell Miller Jr.
