= Richard C. Tallman =

American judge (born 1953)

Richard Tallman
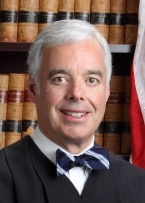

Senior Judge of the United States Court of Appeals for the Ninth Circuit
- Incumbent
- Assumed office March 3, 2018

Judge of the United States Foreign Intelligence Surveillance Court of Review
- In office January 27, 2014 – January 26, 2021
- Appointed by: John Roberts
- Preceded by: Morris S. Arnold
- Succeeded by: Stephen A. Higginson

Judge of the United States Court of Appeals for the Ninth Circuit
- In office May 25, 2000 – March 3, 2018
- Appointed by: Bill Clinton
- Preceded by: Betty Binns Fletcher
- Succeeded by: Eric D. Miller

Personal details
- Born: Richard Charles Tallman; 1953 (age 72–73) Oakland, California, U.S.
- Party: Republican
- Education: Santa Clara University (BS); Northwestern University (JD)

Richard Charles Tallman (born 1953) is a senior United States circuit judge of the United States Court of Appeals for the Ninth Circuit and a former judge of the United States Foreign Intelligence Surveillance Court of Review.

== Early life and education ==
Born in Oakland, California, Tallman received his Bachelor of Science degree in 1975 from the University of Santa Clara and his Juris Doctor in 1978 from Northwestern University School of Law, where he served as the executive director of the Northwestern University Law Review.

== Professional career ==
After serving as a law clerk for Judge Morell Edward Sharp of the United States District Court for the Western District of Washington, Tallman worked as a trial lawyer for the Department of Justice and as an assistant United States attorney in Seattle, Washington. From 1983 until his appointment to the Ninth Circuit in 2000, Tallman was an attorney in private practice in Seattle, including as chairman of the white-collar criminal defense practice group at the former Bogle and Gates law firm between 1990 and 1999. After that firm closed on March 31, 1999, Tallman formed the firm Tallman & Severin.

Among Tallman's higher-profile clients in private practice was representing the Seattle Mariners in legal disputes over scheduling rights in the Kingdome. Tallman also handled medical malpractice and defense procurement cases.

== Federal judicial service ==
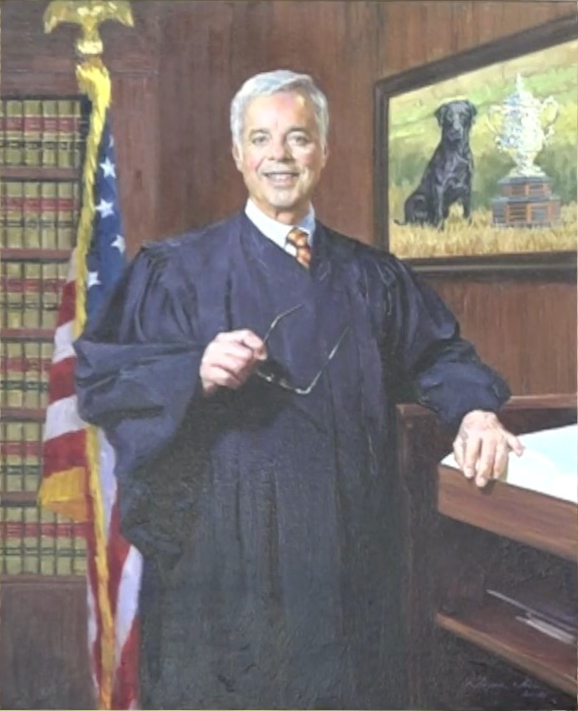
Judge Tallman's portrait.

Clinton's previous nominee to that seat, conservative Washington State Supreme Court Justice Barbara Durham, had been nominated in January 1999 as part of a bipartisan deal brokered by Washington's senators at the time, Slade Gorton and Patty Murray. However, Durham withdrew her nomination to the seat just four months later because of her husband's terminal heart condition. Tallman was chosen after he was one of three potential nominees that Gorton recommended to the White House. Despite being a Republican, Tallman was nominated by President Bill Clinton on October 20, 1999, to fill the seat vacated by Judge Betty Binns Fletcher, who assumed senior status in 1998. He was confirmed by the United States Senate on May 24, 2000, by a voice vote. He received his commission on May 25, 2000. He assumed senior status on March 3, 2018.

On January 27, 2014, Tallman was appointed by Chief Justice John Roberts to a six-year term on the United States Foreign Intelligence Surveillance Court of Review, which considers appeals under the Foreign Intelligence Surveillance Act. He succeeded Morris S. Arnold, whose term expired in August 2013. Tallman's term on the court ended on January 26, 2021.

== Notable opinions ==
Bull v. City and County of San Francisco, August 22, 2008. Tallman dissented on the issue of whether San Francisco jails could strip search those detained for minor, non-violent offenses, contending that they should be able to do so due to security needs: "When people are dying as a result of our errant jurisprudence, it is time to correct the course of our law."

Legal offices
Preceded by Betty Binns Fletcher	Judge of the United States Court of Appeals for the Ninth Circuit; 2000–2018	Succeeded by Eric D. Miller
Preceded by Morris S. Arnold	Judge of the United States Foreign Intelligence Surveillance Court of Review; 2014–2021	Succeeded by Stephen A. Higginson
