= Ralph K. Winter Jr. =

American judge (1935–2020)

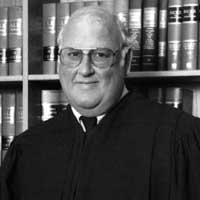

Judge of the United States Foreign Intelligence Surveillance Court of Review
- In office November 14, 2003 – May 18, 2010
- Appointed by: William Rehnquist
- Preceded by: Laurence Silberman
- Succeeded by: William Curtis Bryson

Senior Judge of the United States Court of Appeals for the Second Circuit
- In office September 30, 2000 – December 8, 2020

Chief Judge of the United States Court of Appeals for the Second Circuit
- In office July 1, 1997 – September 30, 2000
- Preceded by: Jon O. Newman
- Succeeded by: John M. Walker Jr.

Judge of the United States Court of Appeals for the Second Circuit
- In office December 10, 1981 – September 30, 2000
- Appointed by: Ronald Reagan
- Preceded by: Walter R. Mansfield
- Succeeded by: Barrington D. Parker Jr.

Personal details
- Born: Ralph Karl Winter Jr. July 30, 1935 Waterbury, Connecticut, U.S.
- Died: December 8, 2020 (aged 85) North Haven, Connecticut, U.S.
- Education: Yale University (BA, LLB)

Ralph Karl Winter Jr. (July 30, 1935 – December 8, 2020) was a United States circuit judge of the United States Court of Appeals for the Second Circuit.

== Early life and career ==
Born in Waterbury, Connecticut, Winter graduated from the Taft School in 1953. He received his Bachelor of Arts degree from Yale University in 1957 and obtained his Bachelor of Laws from Yale Law School in 1960. He served as a law clerk for Judge Caleb Merrill Wright of the United States District Court for the District of Delaware from 1960 to 1961 and as a law clerk for Judge Thurgood Marshall of the United States Court of Appeals for the Second Circuit from 1961 to 1962. He served as a faculty member at Yale Law School from 1962 to 1982, as a research associate and lecturer from 1962 to 1964, as an assistant and associate professor from 1964 to 1968 and as a professor of law from 1968 to 1982. He was a consultant to the Subcommittee on Separation of Powers of the United States Senate Committee on the Judiciary from 1968 to 1972. He was a senior fellow at the Brookings Institution in Washington, D.C., from 1968 to 1970. He was a Guggenheim Fellow in Washington, D.C., from 1971 to 1972. He was an adjunct scholar at the American Enterprise Institute in Washington, D.C., from 1972 to 1981. He was a member of the Board of Trustees at Brooklyn Law School.

Winter advocated for limited government involvement in business matters. He also supported state control in such matters, as opposed to federal control.

== Federal judicial service ==
President Ronald Reagan nominated Winter on November 18, 1981, to a seat on the United States Court of Appeals for the Second Circuit vacated by Judge Walter R. Mansfield. He was confirmed by the United States Senate on December 9, 1981, and received his commission on December 10, 1981. He served as Chief Judge from 1997 to 2000. He assumed senior status on September 30, 2000. He was a member of the Judicial Conference of the United States from 1997 to 2000. From 2003 to 2010, Winter also served as one of the three judges on the United States Foreign Intelligence Surveillance Court of Review. He died on December 8, 2020, from esophageal cancer.

== Notable law clerks ==
- Steven G. Calabresi, clerked 1983–1984, also clerked for Robert Bork and Antonin Scalia
- Paul G. Mahoney, clerked 1984–1985, also clerked for Thurgood Marshall
- George T. Conway III, clerked 1987–1988
- Robert J. Giuffra Jr., clerked 1987–1988, also clerked for William Rehnquist
- Laura Ingraham, clerked 1991–1992, also clerked for Clarence Thomas
- Emmet Flood, clerked 1992–1993, also clerked for Antonin Scalia
- Florence Y. Pan, clerked 1994–1995
- Wendy E. Stone (Long), clerked 1996–1997, also clerked for Clarence Thomas
- Robert M. Daines

== See also ==
- George H. W. Bush Supreme Court candidates

Legal offices
Preceded by Walter R. Mansfield	Judge of the United States Court of Appeals for the Second Circuit; 1981–2000	Succeeded by Barrington D. Parker Jr.
Preceded by Jon O. Newman	Chief Judge of the United States Court of Appeals for the Second Circuit; 1997–2000	Succeeded by John M. Walker Jr.
Preceded by Laurence Silberman	Judge of the United States Foreign Intelligence Surveillance Court of Review; 2003–2010	Succeeded by William Curtis Bryson
