= William Curtis Bryson =

American judge (born 1945)

William Bryson
- Bryson in 2012

Presiding Judge of the United States Foreign Intelligence Surveillance Court of Review
- In office September 10, 2013 – May 18, 2018
- Preceded by: Morris S. Arnold
- Succeeded by: José A. Cabranes

Judge of the United States Foreign Intelligence Surveillance Court of Review
- In office May 19, 2011 – May 18, 2018
- Preceded by: Ralph K. Winter Jr.
- Succeeded by: David B. Sentelle

Senior Judge of the United States Court of Appeals for the Federal Circuit
- Incumbent
- Assumed office January 7, 2013

Judge of the United States Court of Appeals for the Federal Circuit
- In office September 29, 1994 – January 7, 2013
- Appointed by: Bill Clinton
- Preceded by: Howard Thomas Markey
- Succeeded by: Todd M. Hughes

United States Solicitor General
- Acting
- In office January 20, 1993 – June 7, 1993
- President: Bill Clinton
- Preceded by: Ken Starr
- Succeeded by: Drew S. Days III
- In office January 20, 1989 – May 26, 1989
- President: George H. W. Bush
- Preceded by: Charles Fried
- Succeeded by: Ken Starr

Personal details
- Born: William Curtis Bryson; August 19, 1945 (age 81) Houston, Texas, U.S.
- Spouse: Julia Penny Clark
- Children: 2
- Education: Harvard University (BA); University of Texas, Austin (JD)

William Curtis Bryson (born August 19, 1945) is a senior United States circuit judge of the United States Court of Appeals for the Federal Circuit. He also served a 7-year term as a judge on the United States Foreign Intelligence Surveillance Court of Review, until 2018, and on September 1, 2013, became the presiding judge of that court.

== Early life and education ==
Born in Houston, Texas, Bryson graduated from St. John's School in 1963 and went on to receive his Bachelor of Arts degree magna cum laude from Harvard University in 1969 and his Juris Doctor from the University of Texas School of Law in 1973. After graduating from law school, Bryson clerked for Judge Henry Friendly of the United States Court of Appeals for the Second Circuit. Following his clerkship with Judge Friendly, he clerked for Justice Thurgood Marshall of the United States Supreme Court.

== Career ==
At the United States Department of Justice he served successively as Assistant to the United States Solicitor General, from 1978 to 1979; Chief, Appellate Section of the United States Department of Justice Criminal Division, from 1979 to 1982; Special Counsel, Organized Crime and Racketeering Section in the Criminal Division from 1982 to 1986 (where he received the Attorney General's Award for Exceptional Service in 1984); Deputy United States Solicitor General, from 1986 to 1994; and Deputy Associate United States Attorney General (Acting Associate United States Attorney General) in 1994. Judge Bryson is among the most prolific writers on the subject of government contracts. In 2010, he was the only federal circuit judge to write more than two government contract related opinions.

== Federal judicial service ==
On June 22, 1994, Bryson was nominated by President Bill Clinton to a seat on the United States Court of Appeals for the Federal Circuit vacated by Judge Howard Thomas Markey. Bryson was confirmed by the United States Senate on September 28, 1994, and received his commission the following day. Bryson assumed senior status on January 7, 2013.

== Personal life ==
Bryson is married to Julia Penny Clark, an attorney specializing in labor law and employee benefits. They met in law school, and clerked together at the U.S. Supreme Court. They have two daughters.

== See also ==
- List of law clerks for the tenth seat of the Supreme Court of the United States

== Bibliography ==
- Bryson, William C.; Sara S. Beale (1986). Grand jury law and practice (Looseleaf, 2 vol.). Wilmette, Ill.: Callaghan. LCCN 85029164.

== Notes ==
Legal offices
Preceded by Charles Fried	United States Solicitor General; Acting; 1989	Succeeded by Ken Starr
Preceded by Ken Starr	United States Solicitor General; Acting; 1993	Succeeded by Drew S. Days III
Preceded by Howard Thomas Markey	Judge of the United States Court of Appeals for the Federal Circuit; 1994–2013	Succeeded by Todd M. Hughes
Preceded by Ralph K. Winter Jr.	Judge of the United States Foreign Intelligence Surveillance Court of Review; 2011–2018	Succeeded by David B. Sentelle
Preceded by Morris S. Arnold	Presiding Judge of the United States Foreign Intelligence Surveillance Court of Review; 2013–2018	Succeeded by José A. Cabranes
