= Janet Bond Arterton =

American judge (born 1944)

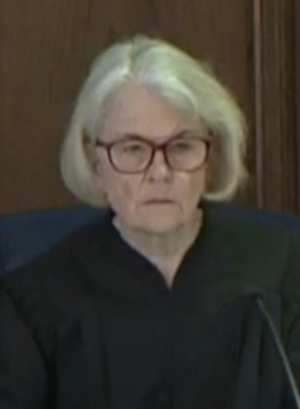

Senior Judge of the United States District Court for the District of Connecticut
- Incumbent
- Assumed office July 1, 2014

Judge of the United States District Court for the District of Connecticut
- In office March 24, 1995 – July 1, 2014
- Appointed by: Bill Clinton
- Preceded by: José A. Cabranes
- Succeeded by: Victor Allen Bolden

Personal details
- Born: Janet MacArthur Bond; February 8, 1944 (age 82) Philadelphia, Pennsylvania, U.S.
- Education: Mount Holyoke College (BA); Northeastern University School of Law (JD)

Janet MacArthur Bond Arterton (born February 8, 1944) is an inactive senior United States district judge of the United States District Court for the District of Connecticut.

== Education and career ==
Arterton was born in Philadelphia, Pennsylvania. She received a Bachelor of Arts degree from Mount Holyoke College in 1966, and then received a Juris Doctor from Northeastern University School of Law in 1977. She was a law clerk for Judge Herbert Jay Stern of the United States District Court for the District of New Jersey from 1977 to 1978, and then was in private practice of law in New Haven, Connecticut from 1978 to 1995.

== Federal judicial service ==
On January 23, 1995, Arterton was nominated by President Bill Clinton to serve as a United States district judge of the United States District Court for the District of Connecticut, to a seat vacated by Judge José A. Cabranes. She was confirmed by the United States Senate on March 24, 1995, and received her commission the same day. She assumed senior status on July 1, 2014. She assumed inactive senior status on October 15, 2023.

During her service on the court, she presided over the case of Ricci v. DeStefano.

Legal offices
| Preceded by José A. Cabranes | Judge of the United States District Court for the District of Connecticut; 1995–2014 | Succeeded by Victor Allen Bolden |
