= Todd M. Hughes =

American judge (born 1966)

Todd Hughes
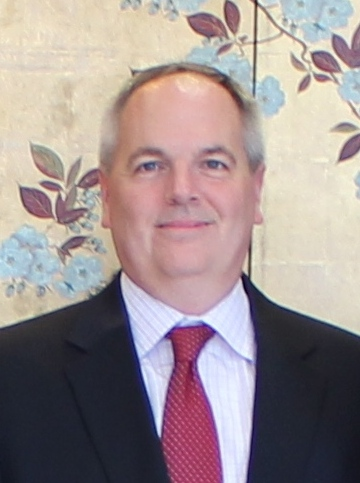
- Hughes in 2013

Judge of the United States Court of Appeals for the Federal Circuit
- Incumbent
- Assumed office September 24, 2013
- Appointed by: Barack Obama
- Preceded by: William Curtis Bryson

Personal details
- Born: Todd Michael Hughes; November 1, 1966 (age 59) Delaware, Ohio, U.S.
- Education: Harvard University (BA); Duke University (MA, JD)

Todd Michael Hughes (born November 1, 1966) is a United States circuit judge of the United States Court of Appeals for the Federal Circuit.

== Biography ==
Hughes was born on November 1, 1966, in Delaware, Ohio. He graduated from Harvard College with a B.A. degree in 1989. He earned both a Juris Doctor with honors and a Master of Arts in English at a joint degree program at Duke University in 1992. He clerked for Robert B. Krupansky of the United States Court of Appeals for the Sixth Circuit. In 1994, he joined the Commercial Litigation Branch of the Civil Division at the United States Department of Justice as a trial attorney. He was appointed Assistant Director for Commercial Litigation in 1999 and became Deputy Director in 2007, serving until 2013.

At the DOJ, Hughes handled matters of federal personnel law, veterans' benefits, international trade, government contracts, and jurisdictional issues regarding the United States Court of Federal Claims. He has extensive experience before the Court of Appeals for the Federal Circuit, the United States Court of International Trade, and the United States Court of Federal Claims. Hughes has been awarded several special commendations from the DOJ and a special contribution award from the United States Department of Veterans Affairs. He has taught at the Cleveland-Marshall College of Law and Duke University's writing program.

== Federal judicial service ==
On February 7, 2013, President Barack Obama nominated Hughes to serve as a United States Circuit Judge of the United States Court of Appeals for the Federal Circuit, to the seat vacated by Judge William Curtis Bryson who assumed senior status on January 7, 2013. He received a hearing before the Senate Judiciary Committee on June 19, 2013, and was reported to the floor of the Senate on July 18, 2013, by a voice vote. The Senate confirmed his nomination on September 24, 2013 by a 98–0 vote. He received his commission on September 24, 2013. He assumed office on September 30, 2013. Hughes is the first openly gay judge on a federal circuit court. Obama previously nominated another gay lawyer, Edward C. DuMont, to the same court, but DuMont withdrew his name when it became clear that his nomination was not going to proceed in the Senate Judiciary Committee.

== See also ==
- Joe Biden Supreme Court candidates
- List of first minority male lawyers and judges in the United States
- List of LGBT jurists in the United States

Legal offices
Preceded by William Curtis Bryson	Judge of the United States Court of Appeals for the Federal Circuit; 2013–present	Incumbent
