= Morris S. Arnold =

American judge (born 1941)

Morris Arnold
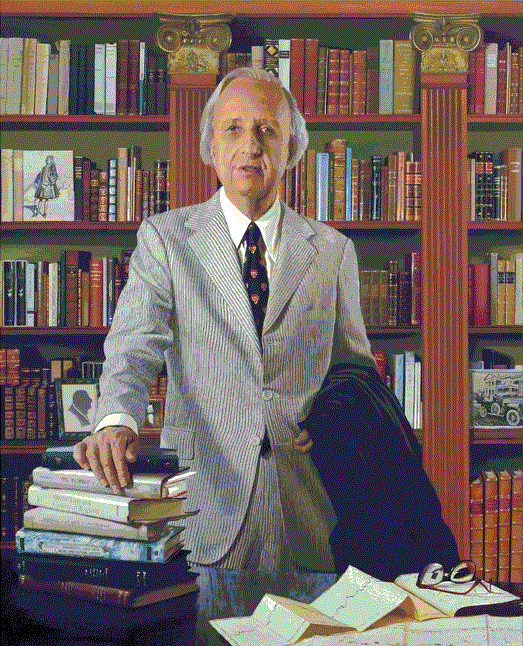

Presiding Judge of the United States Foreign Intelligence Surveillance Court of Review
- In office May 19, 2012 – August 31, 2013
- Appointed by: John Roberts
- Preceded by: Bruce M. Selya
- Succeeded by: William Curtis Bryson

Judge of the United States Foreign Intelligence Surveillance Court of Review
- In office May 19, 2008 – August 31, 2013
- Appointed by: John Roberts
- Preceded by: Edward Leavy
- Succeeded by: Richard C. Tallman

Senior Judge of the United States Court of Appeals for the Eighth Circuit
- Incumbent
- Assumed office October 9, 2006

Judge of the United States Court of Appeals for the Eighth Circuit
- In office May 26, 1992 – October 9, 2006
- Appointed by: George H. W. Bush
- Preceded by: Donald P. Lay
- Succeeded by: Bobby Shepherd

Judge of the United States District Court for the Western District of Arkansas
- In office December 17, 1985 – June 1, 1992
- Appointed by: Ronald Reagan
- Preceded by: Seat established
- Succeeded by: Harry F. Barnes

Personal details
- Born: Morris Sheppard Arnold; October 8, 1941 (age 84) Texarkana, Texas, U.S.
- Relatives: Richard S. Arnold (brother); Morris Sheppard (grandfather); John L. Sheppard (great-grandfather); Connie Mack III (cousin)
- Education: University of Arkansas (BS, LLB); Harvard University (LLM, SJD)

Morris Sheppard Arnold (born October 8, 1941) is a Senior United States circuit judge of the United States Court of Appeals for the Eighth Circuit and previously was a United States district judge of the United States District Court for the Western District of Arkansas.

== Education and career ==
Born in 1941, in Texarkana, Texas, Arnold received a Bachelor of Science in Electrical Engineering degree in 1965 from the University of Arkansas, a Bachelor of Laws in 1968 from the University of Arkansas School of Law, a Master of Laws in 1969 from Harvard Law School and a Doctor of Juridical Science in 1971 from the same institution. He entered private practice in Texarkana, Arkansas in 1968.

Arnold was a teaching fellow in law at Harvard University from 1969 to 1970. He was a professor at Indiana University Maurer School of Law from 1971 to 1977. He was Vice President of the University of Pennsylvania and a professor at the University of Pennsylvania Law School from 1977 to 1981. He was a professor at the William H. Bowen School of Law from 1981 to 1984. He returned to private practice in Little Rock, Arkansas from 1981 to 1984. He was Special Chief Justice of the Arkansas Supreme Court in 1982. He was a Special Master for the Chancery Court of Pulaski County, Arkansas in 1983. He was a professor at the University of Pennsylvania Law School from 1984 to 1985. He was a visiting professor at Stanford Law School in 1985. He was dean of the Indiana University Maurer School of Law in 1985.

== Federal judicial service ==
Arnold was nominated by President Ronald Reagan on October 23, 1985, to the United States District Court for the Western District of Arkansas, to a new seat authorized by 98 Stat. 333. He was confirmed by the United States Senate on December 16, 1985, and received his commission on December 17, 1985. His service terminated on June 1, 1992, due to his elevation to the court of appeals.

Arnold was nominated by President George H. W. Bush on November 6, 1991, to a seat on the United States Court of Appeals for the Eighth Circuit vacated by Judge Donald P. Lay. He was confirmed by the Senate on May 21, 1992, and received his commission on May 26, 1992. He assumed senior status on October 9, 2006. He served as a Judge of the United States Foreign Intelligence Surveillance Court of Review from 2008 to 2013, serving as Presiding Judge from 2012 to 2013. He assumed inactive senior status on September 1, 2013, but he returned to the court in January 2016.

== Awards and honors ==
Arnold has been the recipient of many academic honors, including multiple Honorary Doctor of Laws (LLD and JD) from the University of Pennsylvania, the University of Connecticut, UALR, UA, and others. For his work in research and writing about colonial Louisiana, Arnold has received the Ragsdale History Prize, the Booker Worthen Literary Prize, Porter Literary Prize, and the Arkansiana Award, as well as the Chevalier de L’Ordre des Palmes Académiques from the French government.

== Books ==
- Unequal Laws Unto a Savage Race. University of Arkansas Press. 1985. ISBN 978-0-938626-33-6.
- Arkansas Colonials, 1686–1804. Grand Prairie Historical Society. 1986.
- Colonial Arkansas, 1686–1804: A Social and Cultural History. University of Arkansas Press. 1991. Arnold, Morris S. (December 1993). 1993 pbk edition. University of Arkansas Press. ISBN 978-1-55728-222-4.
- The Rumble of a Distant Drum: Quapaws and Old World Newcomers, 1673–1804. University of Arkansas Press. 2000. Arnold, Morris (July 2007). 2007 pbk edition. University of Arkansas Press. ISBN 978-1-55728-590-4.
- The Arkansas Post of Louisiana. University of Arkansas Press. 2017. ISBN 978-1-68226-034-0.

== Sources ==
Legal offices
New seat	Judge of the United States District Court for the Western District of Arkansas; 1985–1992	Succeeded by Harry F. Barnes
Preceded by Donald P. Lay	Judge of the United States Court of Appeals for the Eighth Circuit; 1992–2006	Succeeded by Bobby Shepherd
Preceded by Edward Leavy	Judge of the United States Foreign Intelligence Surveillance Court of Review; 2008–2013	Succeeded by Richard C. Tallman
Preceded by Bruce M. Selya	Presiding Judge of the United States Foreign Intelligence Surveillance Court of Review; 2012–2013	Succeeded by William Curtis Bryson
