= Bobby Shepherd =

American judge (born 1951)

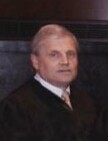

Judge of the United States Court of Appeals for the Eighth Circuit
- Incumbent
- Assumed office October 10, 2006
- Appointed by: George W. Bush
- Preceded by: Morris S. Arnold

Personal details
- Born: Bobby Ed Shepherd; 1951 (age 74–75) Arkadelphia, Arkansas, U.S.
- Spouse: Bobbi
- Children: 3, including Matthew and John
- Education: Ouachita Baptist University (BA); University of Arkansas (JD)

Bobby Ed Shepherd (born 1951) is a United States circuit judge of the United States Court of Appeals for the Eighth Circuit. He maintains chambers in El Dorado, the seat of Union County in south Arkansas.

== Education ==
Shepherd received a Bachelor of Arts degree from Ouachita Baptist University in Arkadelphia in 1973. He received his Juris Doctor from the University of Arkansas School of Law in Fayetteville in 1975.

== Career ==
Shepherd was a United States magistrate judge for the United States District Court for the Western District of Arkansas from 1993 until he joined the Eighth Circuit. His appointment was only the second time ever a sitting magistrate judge had been elevated directly to a federal court of appeals. From 1991 to 1993, Shepherd was an Arkansas state trial judge for the 13th Judicial Circuit, in the southern end of the state. Previously, Shepherd had been in private practice as an attorney in Arkansas from 1976 to 1990.

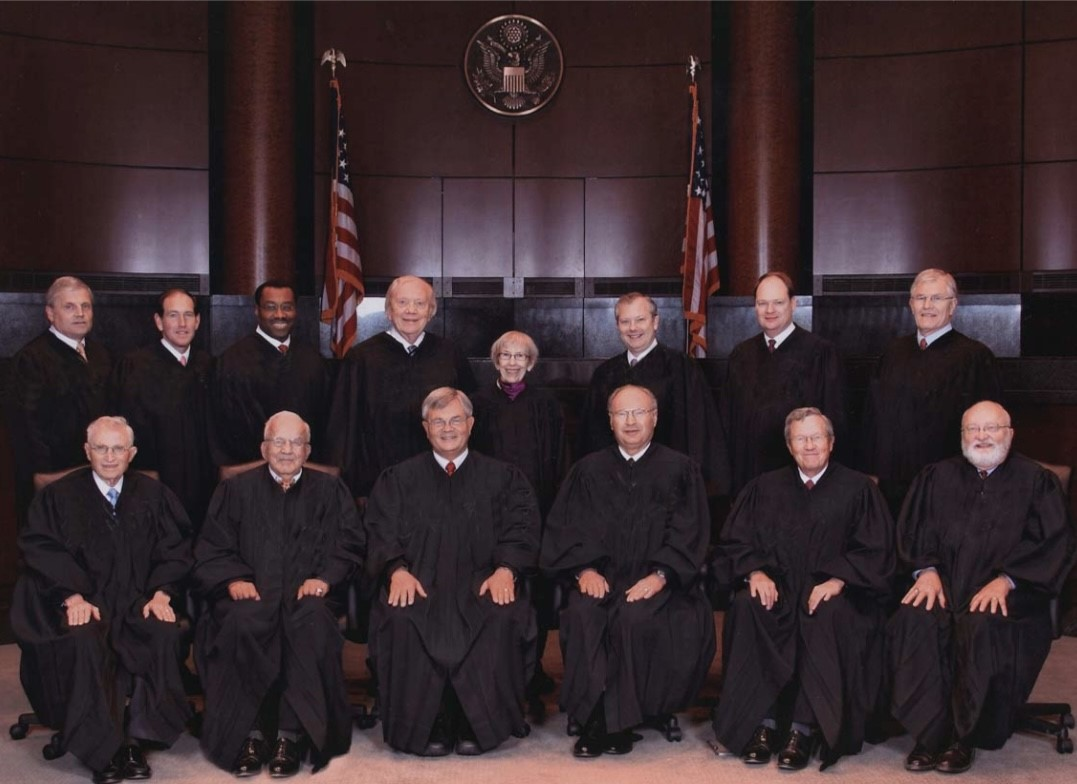
United States Court of Appeals for the Eighth Circuit in 2010

=== Federal judicial service ===
Shepherd was nominated to the Eighth Circuit by President George W. Bush on May 18, 2006, to fill a seat to be vacated by Judge Morris S. Arnold. Shepherd was confirmed by the United States Senate by voice vote on July 20, 2006. He received his commission on October 10, 2006.

On July 20, 2026, Shepherd announced that he would be taking Senior Status.

== Personal life ==
Shepherd's son Matthew Shepherd, has served as a state representative in the Arkansas House of Representatives since 2011 and as the Speaker of the Arkansas House of Representatives since 2018.

Legal offices
Preceded by Morris S. Arnold	Judge of the United States Court of Appeals for the Eighth Circuit; 2006–present	Incumbent
