= American Criminal Law Review =

- Discipline: Law
- Language: English

Publication details
- Former names: Criminal Law Quarterly; American Criminal Law Quarterly
- History: 1962–present
- Publisher: Georgetown University Law Center (United States)
- Frequency: Quarterly

Standard abbreviations
- Bluebook: Am. Crim. L. Rev.
- ISO 4: Am. Crim. Law Rev.

Indexing
- ISSN: 0164-0364
- LCCN: 71649985
- OCLC no.: 1479741

Links
- Journal homepage; Articles Online

The American Criminal Law Review is a student-edited scholarly journal published at Georgetown University Law Center. The ACLR is a journal of American criminal law and white-collar crime.

== Overview ==
ACLR adopts a mix of symposia, articles, and notes. The journal is the most cited criminal law journal by courts, with fifty-seven case cites from 2005 to 2012 (the 38th most of any American law review), and the second most cited criminal law journal by other law reviews, with 1,217 cites from 2005 to 2012. Between 2019 and 2023, ACLR remained the most cited criminal law journal by courts, with 17 cites, and was the most cited criminal law journal by other law reviews, with 386 cites.

== History ==
=== Early years ===
The American Criminal Law Review was first published in 1962 as Criminal Law Quarterly by the USC Gould School of Law in conjunction with the American Bar Association. The ABA moved the publication to the University of Kansas School of Law the following year and changed its title to the American Criminal Law Quarterly ("ACLQ"). As an ABA publication, the ACLQ concentrated on a practitioner's approach to the criminal law.

=== Move to Georgetown Law ===
In 1971, Professor Samuel Dash was elected chairman of the ABA's Criminal Law Section and moved from the University of Kansas School of Law to Georgetown University Law Center. Professor Dash brought the journal with him and changed its name to the American Criminal Law Review. Now edited by students, each issue originally dealt with a single topic. Volume 10, Number 1—the first issue published at Georgetown and under the American Criminal Law Review name—presented a symposium on military law, and began with an essay by the Chief of Staff of the United States Army at the time, Gen. William Westmoreland. That format lasted for only three academic years.

== Annual Survey of White Collar Crime ==
=== Overview ===
In the fall of 1980, the First Survey of White Collar Crime appeared in Volume 18, Number 2. It has evolved into the ACLR's best-known publication. One hornbook, on White Collar Crime by J. Kelly Strader, referred his readers to the Annual Survey, writing: "Readers should note that this area of the law is changing rapidly. For a more extensive discussion of any particular subject, the reader may wish to refer to...The Annual Survey of White Collar Crime...."

=== Topics covered ===
The Annual Survey has covered antitrust violations, computer crime, corporate crime, election law violations, employment-related crimes, environmental crime, false statements and false claims, federal criminal conspiracy, financial institutions fraud, the Foreign Corrupt Practices Act, health care fraud, intellectual property crimes, mail and wire fraud, money laundering, obstruction of justice, perjury, public corruption, the Racketeer Influenced and Corrupt Organizations Act, securities fraud, and tax violations.

== Notable contributors ==
ACLR contributors have included figures in American government, academia, and legal practice, including Justice William Brennan, Sen. Ted Kennedy, Prof. Akhil Amar, Cyrus R. Vance Jr. Larry D. Thompson, Julie O'Sullivan and then-Judge Stephen Breyer.

== Membership ==
The American Criminal Law Review is composed of about one hundred and three second- and third-year law students. The third-year students serve in editorial positions and the second-year students work as staff. Students are offered positions on ACLR based on their first-year grades and performance in a writing and citation competition. First-year students participate in the competition after completing their final exams in the spring semester. The competition is administered by the Georgetown Law Office of Journal Administration.
