= List of law clerks for the eighth seat of the Supreme Court of the United States =

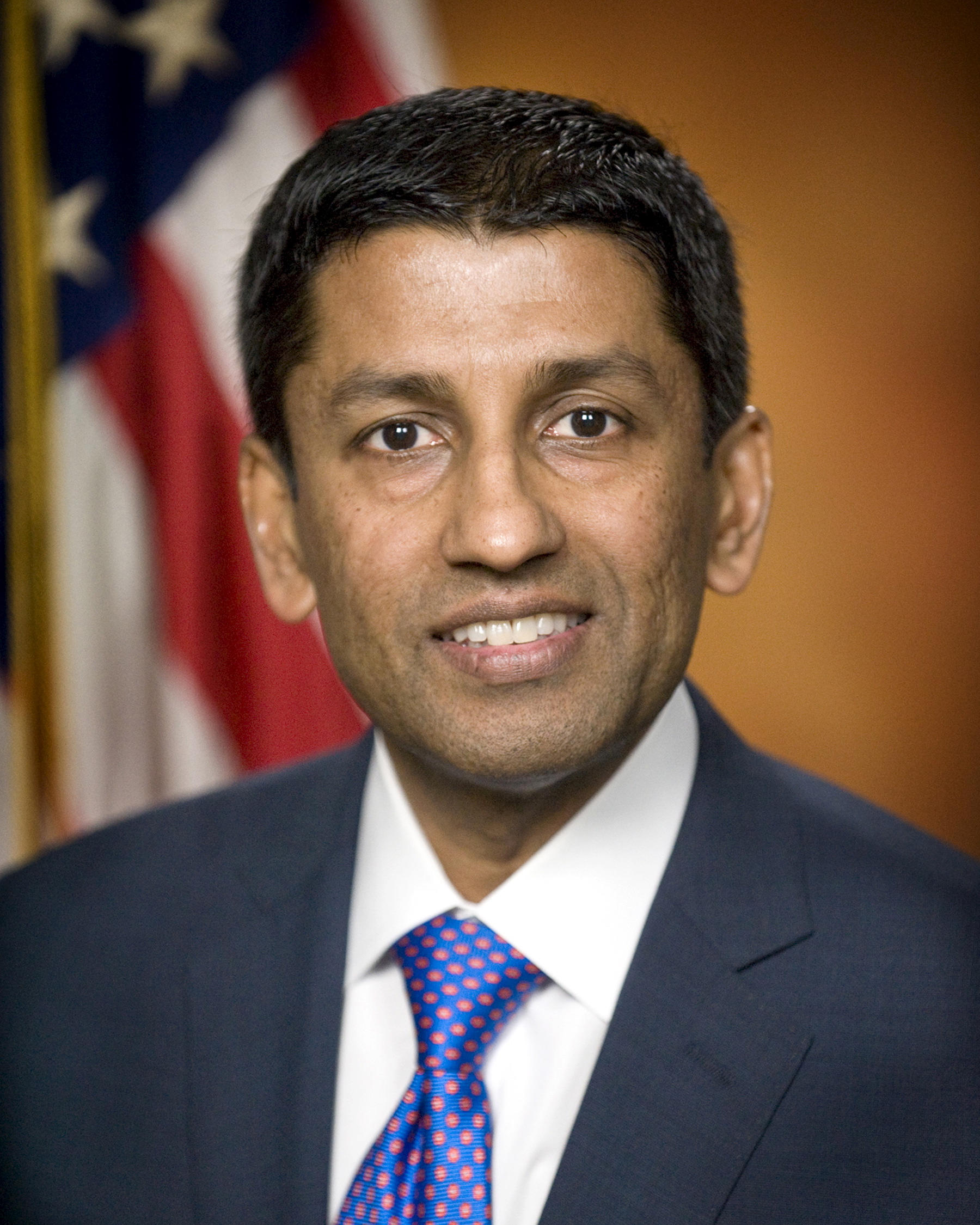
Sri Srinivasan, Chief Judge of the United States Court of Appeals for the District of Columbia Circuit, clerked for Justice Sandra Day O'Connor during the 1997–98 term.

Law clerks have assisted the justices of the United States Supreme Court in various capacities since the first one was hired by Justice Horace Gray in 1882. Each justice is permitted to have between three and four law clerks per Court term. Most persons serving in this capacity are recent law school graduates (and typically graduated at the top of their class). Among their many functions, clerks do legal research that assists justices in deciding what cases to accept and what questions to ask during oral arguments, prepare memoranda, and draft orders and opinions. After retiring from the Court, a justice may continue to employ a law clerk, who may be assigned to provide additional assistance to an active justice or may assist the retired justice when sitting by designation with a lower court.

== Table of law clerks ==
The following is a table of law clerks serving the associate justice holding the eighth seat of the Supreme Court (the Court's eighth associate justice seat by order of creation), and one of two established (along with the later abolished seat 7) on March 3, 1837 by the 24th Congress through the Eighth and Ninth Circuits Act of 1837 (5 Stat. 176). This seat is currently occupied by Justice Samuel Alito.

Seat 8 associate justices and law clerks

John Marshall Harlan

December 10, 1877 –
October 14, 1911

Clerk	Started	Finished	School (year)	Previous clerkship
Edwin P. Hanna	1888	1890	GW (1884)	
Henry M. Clapp	1889	1890		
Blewett Harrison Lee	1889	1890	Harvard (1888)	
Edgar R. Rombauer	1889	1891	WashU (1887)	
William R. Harr	1896	1897	Georgetown (1895)	
William R. Harr	1898	1902	Georgetown (1895)	
John E. Hoover	1906	1911		R. W. Peckham

Mahlon Pitney

March 18, 1912 –
December 31, 1922

Clerk	Started	Finished	School (year)	Previous clerkship
John E. Hoover	1912	1912		R. W. Peckham / Harlan
Horatio Stonier, Jr.	1913	1922		stenographer, New Jersey Court of Errors and Appeals
William A.D. Dyke	1922	December 1922	Georgetown (1921)	U.S. Senate, Asst. Clerk (1918–1921)

Edward Terry Sanford

February 19, 1923 –
March 8, 1930

Clerk	Started	Finished	School (year)	Previous clerkship
William R. Loney	1923	1930	National (1907)	

Owen Roberts

June 2, 1930 –
July 31, 1945

Clerk	Started	Finished	School (year)	Previous clerkship
William R. Loney	1930	1931	National (1907)	Sanford
Albert J. Schneider	1930	1945	GW (1934)	

Harold H. Burton

October 1, 1945 –
October 13, 1958

Clerk	Started	Finished	School (year)	Previous clerkship
W. Howard Mann	1945	1946	Iowa (1941)	Rutledge (D.C. Cir.)
Harris K. Weston	1946	1947	Harvard (1946)	none
Bruce Griswold	1947	1949	Case Western (1947)	none
Marvin S. Schwartz	1950	1951	Penn (1949)	Goodrich (3d Cir.)
Ray Simmons	1950	1951	Nebraska (1950)	none
John W. Douglas	1951	1952	Yale (1948)	
Charles C. Hileman, III	1951	1952	Penn (1950)	Goodrich (3d Cir.)
John M. Leahy	1952	1953	Catholic (1950)	Tamm (D.D.C.) / Fahy (D.C. Cir.)
James R. Ryan	1952	1954	Penn (1951)	Goodrich (3d Cir.)
Raymond S. Troubh	1953	1954	Yale (1952)	T. Swan (2d Cir.)
William B. Matteson	1954	1955	Harvard (1953)	A. Hand (2d Cir.)
Thomas N. O'Neill, Jr.	1954	1955	Penn (1953)	Goodrich (3d Cir.)
Roger C. Cramton	1956	1957	Chicago (1955)	Waterman (2d Cir.)
David E. Wagoner	1956	1957	Penn (1953)	Goodrich (3d Cir.)
Carl W. Schneider	1957	1958	Penn (1956)	Goodrich (3d Cir.)
Preble Stoltz	1957	1958	Chicago (1956)	Pope (9th Cir.)
R. Markham Ball (shared with Reed and Warren)	1960	1961	Harvard (1960)	none
Timothy B. Dyk (shared with Reed)	1961	1962	Harvard (1961)	none
Theodore R. Boehm (shared with Reed and Warren)	1963	1964	Harvard (1963)	none

Potter Stewart

October 14, 1958 –
July 3, 1981

Clerk	Started	Finished	School (year)	Previous clerkship
Terrance Sandalow (hired by Burton)	1958	1959	Chicago (1957)	Waterman (2d Cir.)
John L. ("Jack") Evans	1958	1959	Ohio State (1958)	
Jerold H. Israel	1959	1961	Yale (1959)	none
Thomas E. Kauper	1960	1962	Michigan (1960)	none
Robert Emil Hudec	1961	1963	Yale (1961)	none
Jan Ginter Deutsch	1962	1963	Yale (1962)	none
Alan R. Novak	1963	1964	Yale (1963)	none
Paul M. Dodyk	1964	1965	Harvard (1964)	none
Monroe Price	1964	1965	Yale (1964)	none
William Carey Parker 2d	1965	1966	Harvard (1965)	none
Steven Michael Umin	1965	1966	Yale (1964)	Traynor (Cal.)
E. Edward Bruce	1966	1966	Yale (1966)	none
Richard Burleson Stewart	1966	1967	Harvard (1966)	none
Laurence H. Tribe	1967	1968	Harvard (1966)	Tobriner (Cal.)
Curtis Stephen Howard	1967	1968	Yale (1966)	none
Silas J. Wasserstrom	1968	1969	Yale (1967)	J. S. Wright (D.C. Cir.)
Alan K. Palmer	1968	1969	Harvard (1967)	S. Barnes (9th Cir.)
Michael Ellmore Patterson	1968	1969	Columbia (1967)	McGowan (D.C. Cir)
Leonard H. ("Len") Becker	1969	1970	Yale (1968)	
George Marshall Moriarty (hired by Burger, shared with White, Black, Burger)	1969	1970	Harvard (1968)	Aldrich (1st Cir.)
Evan A. Davis	1970	1971	Columbia (1969)	Leventhal (D.C. Cir.)
Duncan Kennedy	1970	1971	Yale (1970)	none
Thomas D. Rowe, Jr.	1970	1971	Harvard (1970)	none
Benjamin W. Heineman, Jr.	1971	1972	Yale (1971)	none
William H. Jeffress, Jr.	1971	1972	Yale (1970)	Gesell (D.D.C.)
Richard D. Parker	1971	1972	Harvard (1970)	none
David M. Schulte	1972	1973	Yale (1971)	Weinfeld (S.D.N.Y.)
John G. Koeltl	1972	1973	Harvard (1971)	Weinfeld (S.D.N.Y.)
James R. Bieke	1972	1973	Michigan (1970)	Harlan II / Lumbard (2d Cir.)
Frederick T. Davis	1973	1974	Columbia (1972)	Friendly (2d Cir.)
Andrew D. Hurwitz	1973	1974	Yale (1972)	J. J. Smith (2d Cir.) / Newman (D. Conn.)
Terrence G. Perris	1973	1974	Michigan (1972)	Lumbard (2d Cir.)
Jerry Lawrence Siegel	1973	1974	Yale (1972)	Renfrew (N.D. Cal.)
Ronald M. Gould	1974	1975	Michigan (1973)	McCree (6th Cir.)
Curtis Alan Hessler	1974	1975	Yale (1973)	J. S. Wright (D.C. Cir.)
Dennis M. Perluss	1974	1975	Harvard (1973)	Hufstedler (9th Cir.)
William J. Davey	1975	1976	Michigan (1974)	Lumbard (2d Cir.)
James N. Gardner	1975	1976	Yale (1974)	Goodwin (9th Cir.)
Ronald A. Stern	1975	1976	Harvard (1974)	Leventhal (D.C. Cir)
Robert L. Deitz (hired by Douglas / shared with White)	1975	1976	Harvard (1975)	none
Gilbert L. Kujovich (shared with White)	1976	1977	Harvard (1975)	Hufstedler (9th Cir.)
Daniel J. Meltzer	1976	1977	Harvard (1975)	McGowan (D.C. Cir.)
Judith A. Miller	1976	1977	Yale (1975)	Leventhal (D.C. Cir.)
Mark F. Pomerantz	1976	1977	Michigan (1975)	Weinfeld (S.D.N.Y.)
Ellen Borgersen	1977	1978	Michigan (1976)	Coffin (1st Cir.)
Barbara R. Hauser	1977	1978	Penn (1976)	Hunter (3d Cir.)
Robert S. Litt	1977	1978	Yale (1976)	Weinfeld (S.D.N.Y.)
Jay M. Spears	1977	1978	Stanford (1976)	Bazelon (D.C. Cir)
Daniel R. Fischel	1978	1979	Chicago (1977)	Fairchild (7th Cir.)
Henry T. ("Hank") Greely	1978	1979	Yale (1977)	Wisdom (5th Cir.)
Virginia Kerr	1978	1979	Penn (1977)	Schreiber (N.J.)
Eric B. Amstutz	1979	1980	Yale (1978)	Gesell (D.D.C.)
David D. Hiller	1979	1980	Harvard (1978)	Wilkey (D.C. Cir.)
Saul B. Goodman	1979	1980	Virginia (1978)	McGowan (D.C. Cir)
Robert Weisberg	1980	1981	Stanford (1979)	J. S. Wright (D.C. Cir.)
Elliot Francis Gerson	1980	1981	Yale (1979)	Leventhal (D.C. Cir.)
Carl E. Schneider	1980	1981	Michigan (1979)	McGowan (D.C. Cir)
Howard William Gutman	1981	1982	Harvard (1980)	I. Goldberg (5th Cir.)
Jeffrey H. Blattner	1982	1983	Harvard (1980)	Keeton (D. Mass)
David M. Geronemus	1983	1984	NYU (1982)	Seitz (3d Cir.)
Rory Knox Little (shared with Brennan, Powell, Stevens)	1984	1985	Yale (1982)	Oberdorfer (D.D.C.)
Robert B. Stack	1985	1986	Georgetown (1984)	Flannery (D.C. Cir.)

Sandra Day O'Connor

September 25, 1981 –
January 31, 2006

Clerk	Started	Finished	School (year)	Previous clerkship
Brian Cartwright	1981	1982	Harvard (1980)	Wilkey (D.C. Cir.)
John B. Dwyer	1981	1982	Berkeley (1980)	H. Edwards (D.C. Cir.)
Deborah A. Jones (Merritt)	1981	1982	Columbia (1980)	R. B. Ginsburg (D.C. Cir.)
Ruth V. McGregor	1981	1982	Arizona State (1974)	none
Gary L. Francione	1982	1983	Virginia (1981)	Tate (5th Cir.)
Stewart J. Schwab	1982	1983	Michigan (1980)	J. D. Phillips (4th Cir.)
Mary Kathleen Smalley	1982	1983	Harvard (1981)	Wisdom (5th Cir.)
Jane F. Vehko (Fahey)	1982	1983	William & Mary (1981)	J. Hill (11th Cir.)
Peter W. Huber	1983	1984	Harvard (1982)	R. B. Ginsburg (D.C. Cir.)
Glen D. Nager	1983	1984	Stanford (1982)	J. S. Wright (D.C. Cir.)
Victoria L. Radd (Rollins)	1983	1984	Harvard (1982)	J. S. Wright (D.C. Cir.)
Richard G. Taranto	1983	1984	Yale (1981)	Bork (D.C. Cir.) / Sofaer (S.D.N.Y.)
Gail B. Agrawal	1984	1985	Tulane (1983)	Wisdom (5th Cir.)
W. Scott Bales	1984	1985	Harvard (1983)	Sneed (9th Cir.)
Kent D. Syverud	1984	1985	Michigan (1981)	Oberdorfer (D.D.C.)
Barbara Bennett Woodhouse	1984	1985	Columbia (1983)	Sofaer (S.D.N.Y.)
Christopher Cerf	1985	1986	Columbia (1984)	J. S. Wright (D.C. Cir.)
Stephen G. Gilles	1985	1986	Chicago (1984)	Bork (D.C. Cir.)
Julie R. O'Sullivan	1985	1986	Cornell (1984)	L. Campbell (1st Cir.)
John K. Setear	1985	1986	Yale (1984)	McGowan (D.C. Cir.)
Charles A. Blanchard	1986	1987	Harvard (1985)	H. Edwards (D.C. Cir.)
Daniel J. Bussel	1986	1987	Stanford (1985)	S. Breyer (1st Cir.)
Susan A. Creighton	1986	1987	Stanford (1984)	Rymer (C.D. Cal.)
Joan I. Greco	1986	1987	Harvard (1985)	R. B. Ginsburg (D.C. Cir.)
Sharon L. Beckman	1987	1988	Michigan (1986)	Coffin (1st Cir.)
Steven T. Catlett	1987	1988	Columbia (1985)	Starr (D.C. Cir.)
Susan A. Dunn	1987	1988	Stanford (1986)	Sneed (9th Cir.)
Nelson Lund	1987	1988	Chicago (1985)	P. Higginbotham (5th Cir.)
Adalberto J. Jordan	1988	1989	Miami (1987)	T. A. Clark (11th Cir.)
Daniel M. Mandil	1988	1989	Columbia (1987)	R. B. Ginsburg (D.C. Cir.)
Andrew G. McBride	1988	1989	Stanford (1987)	Bork (D.C. Cir.)
Jane E. Stromseth	1988	1989	Yale (1987)	Oberdorfer (D.D.C.)
Ivan K. Fong	1989	1990	Stanford (1987)	Mikva (D.C. Cir.)
Marci A. Hamilton	1989	1990	Penn (1988)	Becker (3d Cir.)
Sandra Segal Ikuta	1989	1990	UCLA (1988)	Kozinski (9th Cir.)
Richard D. Klingler	1989	1990	Stanford (1988)	Starr (D.C. Cir.)
Iman Anabtawi	1990	1991	Stanford (1989)	Silberman (D.C. Cir.)
Kevin M. Kelly	1990	1991	UCLA (1989)	Kozinski (9th Cir.)
Denise Posse-Blanco Lindberg	1990	1991	BYU (1988)	McKay (10th Cir.)
Mark S. Snyderman	1990	1991	Chicago (1989)	Kozinski (9th Cir.)
Ashby D. Boyle II (shared with Burger)	1990	1991	Columbia (1990)	None
Stuart Banner	1991	1992	Stanford (1988)	Kozinski (9th Cir.)
Caroline M. Brown	1991	1992	Harvard (1990)	R. B. Ginsburg (D.C. Cir.)
Linda R. Helyar (Meyer)	1991	1992	Berkeley (1987)	W. Norris (9th Cir.) / Legge (N.D. Cal.)
Crystal Nix(-Hines) (shared with Marshall)	1991	1992	Harvard (1990)	W. Norris (9th Cir.)
Austin C. Schlick	1991	1992	Yale (1990)	Mikva (D.C. Cir.)
Matthew D. Adler	1992	1993	Yale (1991)	H. Edwards (D.C. Cir.)
E. Vaughn Dunnigan	1992	1993	Columbia (1989)	Browning (9th Cir.)
Amy F. Kett	1992	1993	Harvard (1991)	Silberman (D.C. Cir.)
Jeffrey A. Lamken	1992	1993	Stanford (1990)	Kozinski (9th Cir.)
Katherine L. Adams	1993	1994	Chicago (1992)	S. Breyer (1st Cir.)
James Forman Jr.	1993	1994	Yale (1992)	W. Norris (9th Cir.)
Mark A. Perry	1993	1994	Chicago (1991)	Kozinski (9th Cir.)
Eugene Volokh	1993	1994	UCLA (1992)	Kozinski (9th Cir.)
Viet D. Dinh	1994	1995	Harvard (1993)	Silberman (D.C. Cir.)
Elizabeth L. Earle (Beske)	1994	1995	Columbia (1993)	Wald (D.C. Cir.)
David G. Ellen	1994	1995	Harvard (1992)	R. B. Ginsburg (D.C. Cir.) / S. Breyer (1st Cir.)
David C. Kravitz	1994	1995	Michigan (1993)	S. Breyer (1st Cir.)
Stuart F. Delery (shared with White)	1994	1995	Yale (1993)	Tjoflat (11th Cir.)
Sean W. Gallagher	1995	1996	Michigan (1994)	Kozinski (9th Cir.)
Gretchen C. Rubin	1995	1996	Yale (1994)	Leval (2d Cir.)
Julia B. Shelton (Ambrose)	1995	1996	Vanderbilt (1994)	Wilkinson (4th Cir.)
Simon A. Steel	1995	1996	Chicago (1990)	S. Breyer (1st Cir.)
Rebecca A. Beynon	1996	1997	Texas (1994)	Randolph (D.C. Cir.)
Brian M. Hoffstadt	1996	1997	UCLA (1995)	C. Hall (9th Cir.)
William J. Nardini	1996	1997	Yale (1994)	Calabresi (2d Cir.) / Cabranes (2d Cir.)
Patricia L. Small (Bellia)	1996	1997	Yale (1995)	Cabranes (2d Cir.)
Lisa Kern Griffin	1997	1998	Stanford (1996)	D. W. Nelson (9th Cir.)
Srikanth Srinivasan	1997	1998	Stanford (1995)	Wilkinson (4th Cir.)
Matthew F. Stowe	1997	1998	Harvard (1996)	Luttig (4th Cir.)
Silvija A. Strikis	1997	1998	Georgetown (1995)	H. Edwards (D.C. Cir.)
Sandra Slack Glover	1998	1999	Chicago (1997)	Posner (7th Cir.)
Oona A. Hathaway	1998	1999	Yale (1997)	Wald (D.C. Cir.)
Traci L. Jones (Lovitt)	1998	1999	Duke (1997)	Winter (2d Cir.)
Michael A. Scodro	1998	1999	Yale (1996)	Cabranes (2d Cir.)
Leslie A. Hakala	1999	2000	Yale (1997)	Kozinski (9th Cir.)
Bradley W. Joondeph	1999	2000	Stanford (1994)	Tacha (10th Cir.)
Noah A. Levine	1999	2000	Columbia (1997)	Wilkinson (4th Cir.)
Shirley D. Woodward	1999	2000	Georgetown (1998)	Silberman (D.C. Cir.)
Richard A. Bierschbach	2000	2001	Michigan (1997)	Randolph (D.C. Cir.)
Jennifer M. Mason McAward	2000	2001	NYU (1998)	Kozinski (9th Cir.)
Tamarra D. Matthews(-Johnson)	2000	2001	Yale (1998)	J. A. W. Rogers (D.C. Cir.)
Stanley J. Panikowski	2000	2001	Virginia (1999)	Wilkinson (4th Cir.)
Carolyn Joanne Frantz	2001	2002	Michigan (2000)	Tatel (D.C. Cir.)
Michelle T. Friedland	2001	2002	Stanford (2000)	Tatel (D.C. Cir.)
Jeremy J. Gaston	2001	2002	Texas (1999)	P. Higginbotham (5th Cir.)
Anup Malani	2001	2002	Chicago (2000)	Williams (D.C. Cir.)
Emily Johnson Henn	2002	2003	Georgetown (1999)	Niemeyer (4th Cir.)
Justin A. Nelson	2002	2003	Columbia (2000)	Wilkinson (4th Cir.)
Allyson Paix Newton (Ho)	2002	2003	Chicago (2000)	Wiener (5th Cir.)
Cristina M. Rodríguez	2002	2003	Yale (2000)	Tatel (D.C. Cir.)
Janet R. Carter	2003	2004	NYU (2001)	Posner (7th Cir.)
Sean C. Grimsley	2003	2004	Michigan (2000)	H. Edwards (D.C. Cir.)
RonNell A. Jones	2003	2004	Ohio State (2000)	W. Fletcher (9th Cir.)
Sambhav N. Sankar	2003	2004	Berkeley (2000)	W. Fletcher (9th Cir.) / L. Pollak (E.D. Pa.)
Joel C. Beauvais	2004	2005	NYU (2002)	H. Edwards (D.C. Cir.)
Theane Diana Evangelis (Kapur)	2004	2005	NYU (2003)	Kozinski (9th Cir.)
Joshua A. Klein	2004	2005	Stanford (2002)	Garland (D.C. Cir.)
Tali Farimah Farhadian (Weinstein)	2004	January 31, 2006	Yale (2003)	Garland (D.C. Cir.)
Benjamin J. Horwich	2005	January 31, 2006	Stanford (2003)	Becker (3d Cir.) / V. Walker (N.D. Cal.)
Amy N. Kapczynski	2005	2006	Yale (2003)	Calabresi (2d Cir.)
Alexander ("Sasha") Volokh	2005	January 31, 2006	Harvard (2004)	Kozinski (9th Cir.)
Justin Driver (shared with Breyer)	2006	2007	Harvard (2004)	Garland (D.C. Cir.)
Heidi Bond (shared with Kennedy)	2007	2008	Michigan (2006)	Kozinski (9th Cir.)
Isaac J. Lidsky (shared with Ginsburg)	2008	2009	Harvard (2004)	Ambro (3d Cir.)
Joshua A. Deahl (shared with Kennedy)	2009	2010	Michigan (2006)	Benavides (5th Cir.)
Kristen E. Eichensehr (shared with Sotomayor)	2010	2011	Yale (2008)	Garland (D.C. Cir.)
Candice Chiu (Wong) (shared with Sotomayor)	2011	2012	Harvard (2008)	Kavanaugh (D.C. Cir.)
Eric F. Citron (shared with Kagan)	2012	2013	Yale (2007)	Robertson (D.D.C.) / Tatel (D.C. Cir.)
Julia A. Malkina (shared with Breyer)	2013	2014	Yale (2011)	Kavanaugh (D.C. Cir.)
Eli Noam Savit (shared with Ginsburg)	2014	2015	Michigan (2010)	Tatel (D.C. Cir.) / Bea (9th Cir.)
Sarah Gardner Boyce (Goldsticker)	2015	2016	Duke (2012)	Sutton (6th Cir.)

Samuel Alito

January 31, 2006 –
Incumbent

Clerk	Started	Finished	School (year)	Previous clerkship
Adam G. Ciongoli	February 2006	July 2006	Georgetown (1995)	Alito (3d Cir.)
Benjamin J. Horwich	January 2006	July 2006	Stanford (2003)	O'Connor / Becker (3d Cir.) / V. Walker (N.D. Cal.)
Hannah Clayson Smith	February 2006	July 2006	BYU (2001)	Thomas / Alito (3d Cir.)
Alexander ("Sasha") Volokh	January 2006	July 2006	Harvard (2004)	O'Connor / Kozinski (9th Cir.)
Mike Lee	2006	2007	BYU (1997)	Alito (3d Cir.) / Benson (D. Utah)
Christopher J. Paolella	2006	2007	Harvard (1999)	Alito (3d Cir.)
Matthew Schwartz	2006	2007	Columbia (2003)	Alito (3d Cir.)
Gordon Dwyer Todd	2006	2007	Virginia (2000)	Beam (8th Cir.)
James A. Hunter	2007	2008	Yale (2004)	Alito (3d Cir.)
Geoffrey J. Michael	2007	2008	Yale (2000)	Alito (3d Cir.)
David H. Moore	2007	2008	BYU (1996)	Alito (3d Cir.)
Jessica E. Phillips	2007	2008	Northwestern (2006)	Flaum (7th Cir.)
Dana Ann Remus	2008	2009	Yale (2002)	Scirica (3d Cir.)
Andy Oldham	2008	2009	Harvard (2005)	Sentelle (D.C. Cir.)
Michael Hun Park	2008	2009	Yale (2001)	Alito (3d Cir.)
Jack L. White	2008	2009	Pepperdine (2003)	Alito (3d Cir.)
Amit Agarwal	2009	2010	Georgetown (2004)	Kavanaugh (D.C. Cir.)
K. Winn Allen	2009	2010	Virginia (2008)	Sutton (6th Cir.)
Jaynie Rogers Randall Lilley	2009	2010	Yale (2006)	Cabranes (2d Cir.) / M. Patel (N.D. Cal.)
Lucas C. Townsend	2009	2010	Seton Hall (2004)	Barry (3d Cir.) / Ackerman (D.N.J.)
John W. Cerreta	2010	2011	Cornell (2005)	Chagares (3d Cir.) / Alito (3d Cir.)
Steven Menashi	2010	2011	Stanford (2008)	D. Ginsburg (D.C. Cir.)
Garrick Alcarez Sevilla	2010	2011	Duke (2007)	J. R. Brown (D.C. Cir.)
Tara Stuckey (Morrissey)	2010	2011	Notre Dame (2007)	Sutton (6th Cir.)
Sarah K. Campbell	2011	2012	Duke (2009)	W. Pryor (11th Cir.)
Anthony J. Dick	2011	2012	Stanford (2010)	Griffith (D.C. Cir.)
William Ranney Levi	2011	2012	Yale (2010)	Scirica (3d Cir.)
Ryan Dean Newman	2011	2012	Texas (2007)	Edmondson (11th Cir.) / Leon (D.D.C.)
Brian W. Barnes	2012	2013	Yale (2010)	Griffith (D.C. Cir.)
Emily J. Kennedy	2012	2013	Duke (2010)	Batchelder (6th Cir.)
Claire McCusker Murray	2012	2013	Yale (2009)	Kavanaugh (D.C. Cir.)
Ryan J. Watson	2012	2013	GW (2007)	J. R. Brown (D.C. Cir.)
Zina Bash	2013	2014	Harvard (2007)	Kavanaugh (D.C. Cir.)
Kyle D. Hawkins	2013	2014	Minnesota (2009)	E. Jones (5th Cir.)
Paul J. Ray	2013	2014	Harvard (2011)	Livingston (2d Cir.)
Maureen Berard (Soles)	2013	2014	Georgetown (2011)	Scirica (3d Cir.)
Megan M. Dilhoff (Wold)	2014	2015	Notre Dame (2011)	Sutton (6th Cir.)
William C. Marra	2014	2015	Harvard (2012)	W. Pryor (11th Cir.)
Michael H. McGinley	2014	2015	Harvard (2009)	Gorsuch (10th Cir.)
Aaron Lloyd Nielson	2014	2015	Harvard (2007)	J.E. Smith (5th Cir.) / J. R. Brown (D.C. Cir.)
Jonathan A. Berry	2015	2016	Columbia (2011)	J.E. Smith (5th Cir.)
James A. ("Jim") Ligtenberg	2015	2016	Yale (2010)	Wilkinson (4th Cir.)
Barbara Anne Smith (Grieco)	2015	2016	Stanford (2012)	Griffith (D.C. Cir.)
Lucas Walker	2015	2016	Harvard (2009)	Gorsuch (10th Cir.)
Sopan Joshi	February 2016	2016	Northwestern (2013)	Scalia / Feinerman (N.D. Ill.) / Posner (7th Cir)
Michael E. Kenneally	February 2016	2016	Harvard (2011)	Scalia / Gorsuch (10th Cir.)
Jose J. Alicea	2016	2017	Harvard (2013)	O'Scannlain (9th Cir.)
Benjamin J. Cassady	2016	2017	Yale (2013)	Griffith (D.C. Cir.)
Nicole C. Frazer (hired by Scalia)	2016	2017	Virginia (2015)	Sutton (6th Cir.)
Alex Potapov	2016	2017	Yale (2008)	Williams (D.C. Cir.)
Sean Mirski (hired by Scalia)	2017	2018	Harvard (2015)	Kavanaugh (D.C. Cir.)
Kevin M. Neylan Jr.	2017	2018	Harvard (2015)	O'Scannlain (9th Cir.)
Stephen J. Petrany	2017	2018	Yale (2014)	W. Pryor (11th Cir.)
James R. Saywell	2017	2018	Ohio State (2014)	McKeague (6th Cir.) / Sutton (6th Cir.)
Jorge Benjamin Aguiñaga	2018	2019	LSU (2015)	Willett (Tex.) / E. Jones (5th Cir.)
David W. Casazza	2018	2019	Harvard (2015)	Elrod (5th Cir.)
Whitney Downs Hermandorfer	2018	2019	GW (2015)	Kavanaugh (D.C. Cir.) / Leon (D.D.C.)
Sherif Girgis	2018	2019	Yale (2016)	Griffith (D.C. Cir.)
Aimee W. Brown (hired by and shared with Kennedy)	2018	2019	Chicago (2014)	Griffith (D.C. Cir.)
H. Hunter Bruton	2019	2020	Duke (2016)	Huvelle / Hogan (D.D.C.) / Duncan (4th Cir.)
Richard S. Cleary	2019	2020	Columbia (2015)	Livingston (2d Cir.) / Leon (D.D.C.)
Joseph O. Masterman	2019	2020	Yale (2016)	Thapar (E.D. Ky.) / Kethledge (6th Cir.)
Jessica L. Wagner	2019	2020	Virginia (2015)	O'Scannlain (9th Cir.) / J.E. Smith (5th Cir.)
Taylor Hoogendoorn	2020	2021	Yale (2018)	Wilkinson (4th Cir.) / Katsas (D.C. Cir.)
Mary Elizabeth Miller	2020	2021	Michigan (2016)	Owen (5th Cir.) / Leon (D.D.C.)
Maria C. Monaghan	2020	2021	Virginia (2017)	Carnes (11th Cir.) / Thapar (6th Cir.)
David A. Phillips	2020	2021	Harvard (2018)	Colloton (8th Cir.) / Silberman (D.C. Cir.)
Shelby Baird	2021	2022	Duke (2018)	Hardiman (3d Cir.)
Elliot Gaiser	2021	2022	Chicago (2016)	E. Jones (5th Cir.) / Rao (D.C. Cir.)
Eric Palmer	2021	2022	Yale (2017)	W. Pryor (11th Cir.)
Edward Garrett West Jr.	2021	2022	Yale (2018)	O'Scannlain (9th Cir.) / Griffith (D.C. Cir.)
John C. Brinkerhoff Jr.	2022	2023	Yale (2018)	Katsas (D.C. Cir.) / W. Pryor (11th Cir.) / Sykes (7th Cir.)
Robert Flatow	2022	2023	Yale (2020)	Rao (D.C. Cir.) / Sullivan (2d Cir.)
Christopher Pagliarella	2022	2023	Yale (2016)	Hardiman (3d Cir.)
Laura Ruppalt	2022	2023	George Mason (2021)	Hardiman (3d Cir.)
Rishabh Bhandari	2023	2024	Yale (2021)	Thapar (6th Cir.) / Katsas (D.C. Cir.)
Joshua Ha	2023	2024	Harvard (2020)	Grant (11th Cir.) / Menashi (2d. Cir.)
Hannah Templin	2023	2024	Yale (2021)	Bibas (3rd. Cir.)
James Rex Lee	2023	2024	BYU (2021)	Nielson (D. Utah) / Thapar (6th Cir.)
Joshua Altman	2024	2025	Yale (2022)	Park (2d Cir.) / Friedrich (D.D.C.)
Daniella Cass	2024	2025	Penn (2019)	Tjoflat (11th Cir.) / Matey (3d Cir.)
John Macy	2024	2025	Duke (2022)	Walker (D.C. Cir.)
Cameron Silverglate	2024	2025	Yale (2022)	Oldham (5th Cir.) / Thapar (6th Cir.)
Bethany C. Lee	2025	2026	Penn (2022)	Bress (9th Cir.) / Kovner (E.D.N.Y.)
Frederick V. "Van" Augur	2025	2026	Yale (2023)	Thapar (6th Cir.) / Katsas (D.C. Cir.)
Michael J. Bradley	2025	2026	Notre Dame (2023)	Hardiman (3d Cir.) / W. Pryor (11th Cir.)
Joshua A. Hanley	2025	2026	Virginia (2021)	Hardiman (3d Cir.) / Thapar (6th Cir.)
Patrick Dever	2026		Virginia (2022)	Schroeder (M.D.N.C.) / Kethledge (6th Cir.)
Zach Gluckow	2026		Penn (2024)	Bibas (3d Cir.) / Katsas (D.C. Cir.)
Bradley Larson	2026		Columbia (2022)	Stras (8th Cir.) / Katsas (D.C. Cir.)
Marisa Sylvester	2026		Harvard (2024)	Oldham (5th Cir.) / Thapar (6th Cir.)

== Additional sources ==
- Baier, Paul R. (1973). "The Law Clerks: Profile of an Institution," Vanderbilt L. Rev. 26: 1125–77.
- "Georgia Law Alumni Who Have Clerked for a U.S. Supreme Court Justice," Advocate, Spring/Summer 2004 (listing 6 names).
- Judicial Clerkship Handbook, USC Gould Law School, 2013-2014, p. 33, Appendix B.
- Newland, Charles A. (June 1961). "Personal Assistants to the Supreme Court Justices: The Law Clerks," Oregon L. Rev. 40: 306–07.
- News of Supreme Court clerks. University of Virginia Law School, list of clerks, 2004-2018.
- University of Michigan clerks to the Supreme Court, 1991-2017, University of Michigan Law School Web site (2016). Retrieved September 20, 2016.
- Ward, Artemus and David L. Weiden (2006). Sorcerers' Apprentices: 100 Years of Law Clerks at the United States Supreme Court. New York, NY: New York University Press. ISBN 978-0-8147-9420-3, ISBN 978-0-8147-9420-3.
