= John Frank Murphy =

American judge (born 1977)

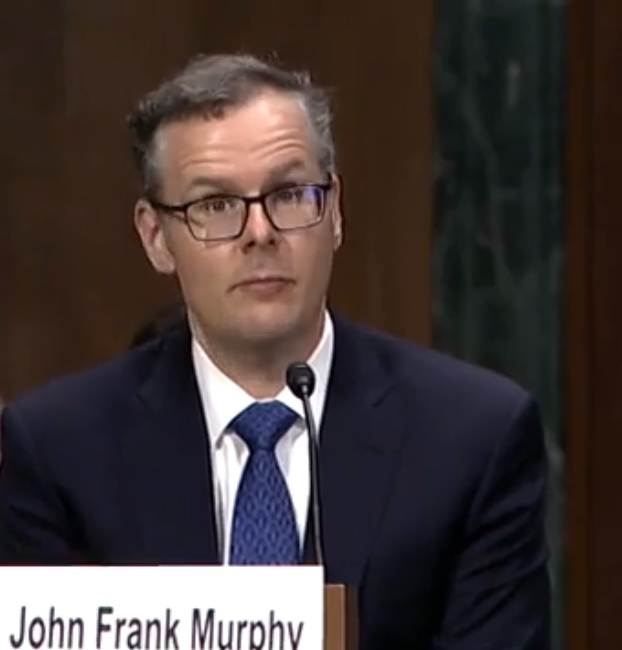

Judge of the United States District Court for the Eastern District of Pennsylvania
- Incumbent
- Assumed office December 23, 2022
- Appointed by: Joe Biden
- Preceded by: Lawrence F. Stengel

Personal details
- Born: 1977 (age 48–49) Philadelphia, Pennsylvania, U.S.
- Education: Cornell University (BS); California Institute of Technology (MS, PhD); Harvard University (JD)

John Frank Murphy (born 1977) is an American lawyer who is a United States district judge of the United States District Court for the Eastern District of Pennsylvania.

== Education ==
Murphy earned a Bachelor of Science in chemical engineering from Cornell University, summa cum laude, in 1999, a Master of Science and Doctor of Philosophy in chemical engineering from the California Institute of Technology in 2002 and 2004, and a Juris Doctor from Harvard Law School, cum laude, in 2007.

== Career ==
From 2008 to 2009, Murphy served as a law clerk for Judge Kimberly A. Moore of the United States Court of Appeals for the Federal Circuit. From 2007 to 2022, he was a partner with the Philadelphia office of BakerHostetler where he focused on intellectual property litigation.

In 2019, Murphy represented a number of plaintiffs suing to block the Pennsylvania Secretary of State's certification of ExpressVote XL electronic voting machines, challenging the security, reliability, and accuracy of the machines.

In 2014, and again in 2016, he worked as an adjunct professor of law at Rutgers Law School and Villanova University School of Law, where he taught patent litigation.

=== Federal judicial service ===
On July 12, 2022, President Joe Biden nominated Murphy to serve as a United States district judge of the United States District Court for the Eastern District of Pennsylvania. Murphy had been recommended by Senator Patrick Toomey and was nominated as part of a bipartisan package of nominees which included Kelley B. Hodge, Kai Scott, and Mia Roberts Perez. President Biden nominated Murphy to the seat vacated by Judge Lawrence F. Stengel, who retired on August 31, 2018. On September 7, 2022, a hearing on his nomination was held before the Senate Judiciary Committee. On September 28, 2022, his nomination was reported out of committee by a 18–4 vote. On December 7, 2022, the United States Senate confirmed his nomination by a 63–28 vote. He received his judicial commission on December 23, 2022.

Legal offices
Preceded by Lawrence F. Stengel	Judge of the United States District Court for the Eastern District of Pennsylvania; 2022–present	Incumbent
