= The Federal Company =

Flour milling company in Tennessee, USA

- Formerly: Federal Compress
- Company type: Privately held company
- Industry: Food processing
- Predecessor: The Great Western Food Company, Holly Farms
- Founded: 1898 in Memphis, Tennessee
- Defunct: 1982
- Fate: Acquired
- Successor: Cargill
- Headquarters: Memphis, Tennessee, United States
- Area served: Southern United States
- Products: Flour milling, food processing

The Federal Company was an American flour milling company based in Memphis, Tennessee with a large market share in the southeastern United States. It was founded in 1898 and by the 1970s through consolidation and acquisition had become a major flour producer in the southern United States. In 1982, the company was acquired by Cargill and the name and its brands were phased out or sold off.

== History ==
The Federal Company was established in 1898 in Memphis, Tennessee, becoming a major player in the flour milling industry. During the 1900s to 1950s the company expanded significantly, developing flour milling and distribution operations across several southeastern states.

Federal had several subsidiaries, Dixie Portland Flour Mills (flour) and Cosby-Hodges Milling Company (animal feed).

In 1964, Federal attempted to launch the "Gingham Girl" brand of premium flour, but it never achieved much market share despite marketing effort.

In 1972, Federal Company and its subsidiary Dixie Portland Flour Mills purchased GWF. As Federal had 11% of the flour market, a Justice Department assistant district attorney in the antitrust division, Thomas E. Kauper, filed suit to require the divestment of GWF. The Justice Department lost that suit, as there was no basis for a regional market to the exclusion of others. Further, Federal's "home flour" market was fragmented between about 50 private-label and non-premium brands, and was also in a steep sales decline from 1965 to 1974.

By the 1970s, Federal was producing about 50 private-label and non-premium brands, but their sales had been in a steep decline. Federal/Dixie-Portland then renovated the plant in 1975.

By 1988, Federal's White Lily was the fourth most popular brand of flour in the US.

In 1982, the company was acquired by then one of America's largest agribusiness firms Cargill, with Federal’s operations gradually integrated into Cargill’s flour and feed milling business. The original brand names were either retired, absorbed or sold.
