= Omri Ben-Shahar =

Israeli academic

Omri Ben-Shahar (Hebrew: עומרי בן-שחר; born 1962) is the Leo and Eileen Herzel Professor of Law, and Kearney Director and founder of the Coase-Sandor Institute for Law and Economics at the University of Chicago Law School. Prior to his tenure at University of Chicago in 2008, Ben-Shahar was the Kirkland and Ellis Professor of Law and Economics at the University of Michigan, and was the founder and director of the Olin Center for Law and Economics from 1999 to 2008.

Ben-Shahar is an expert in contracts, sales, trademark law, insurance law, consumer law, e-commerce, food law, law and economics, and game theory and the law. He writes primarily in the fields of contract law and consumer protection. One of the prominent pioneers of big data and law, his current research involves the use of big data in regulatory and market solutions to social and jurisprudential problems. Ben-Shahar is the most cited active scholar of commercial law in the United States.

== Education and career ==
Ben-Shahar earned a BA and LLB in 1990 from Hebrew University in Jerusalem. He received his PhD in economics and SJD (in law) from Harvard in 1995. He was an assistant professor of law and economics at Tel-Aviv University from 1995, until he moved to the University of Michigan in 1999. In 2008, Ben-Shahar began teaching at the University of Chicago. Ben-Shahar is also the co-reporter for the American Law Institute's Restatement of Consumer Contracts. Ben-Shahar has published dozens of journal articles, and writes a biweekly OpEd at Forbes. He is a co-author (with Carl E. Schneider) of the book, More Than You Wanted to Know: The Failure of Mandated Disclosure (Princeton 2014). Together with Ariel Porat he wrote Personalized Law: Different Rules for Different People (Oxford 2021).
