= Defense Distributed v. Attorney General of New Jersey =

United States federal court case

- Court: United States Court of Appeals for the Third Circuit
- Argued: November 4, 2024
- Decided: February 12, 2026

Court membership
- Judges sitting: Cheryl Krause, Anthony Scirica, Marjorie O. Rendell

Laws applied
- U.S. Const. amend. I

Defense Distributed v. Attorney General of New Jersey, 167 F.4th 65 (3d Cir. 2026), is a United States federal case establishing a test for determining the degree to which computer code may be protected as speech protected by the First Amendment of the United States Constitution.
