= Sandra Slack Glover =

American lawyer

Personal details
- Born: 1970 or 1971 (age 55–56)
- Education: University of Virginia (BA); Duke University (MA); University of Chicago (JD)

Sandra Slack Glover (born 1970/1971) is an American lawyer from Washington D.C. who is a former nominee to serve as an associate justice of the Connecticut Supreme Court.

== Education ==
Glover received a Bachelor of Arts with high distinction in foreign affairs from the University of Virginia in 1992, a Master of Arts in political science from Duke University in 1993, and a J.D. degree with highest honors from the University of Chicago Law School in 1997, where she served as articles editor of the University of Chicago Law Review.

== Career ==
After graduating law school, Glover served as a law clerk to Chief Judge Richard Posner of the United States Court of Appeals for the Seventh Circuit and then to Justice Sandra Day O'Connor of the Supreme Court of the United States. She then served as an appellate attorney at the Natural Resources Division at the Department of Justice. She moved to Connecticut in 2002 and was an associate at Wiggin & Dana. In 2004, she joined the U.S. Attorney's office for the District of Connecticut, serving as Chief of the Appellate Unit since 2010. She has been a member of the Connecticut Bar Association since 2003.

=== Nomination to Connecticut Supreme Court ===
On April 25, 2023, Governor Ned Lamont nominated Glover to be an associate justice of the Connecticut Supreme Court to the seat vacated by Justice Maria Araújo Kahn, who was appointed to the United States Court of Appeals for the Second Circuit.

During her confirmation hearing, she was questioned by the state Judiciary Committee on her support of Amy Coney Barrett, who was nominated to the United States Court of Appeals for the Seventh Circuit in 2017 and later elevated to the Supreme Court of the United States in 2020, because Barrett voted with the majority in Dobbs v. Jackson to overturn Roe v. Wade. Glover stated, during her confirmation hearing, that she would not have signed a 2017 letter to leaders of the Senate Judiciary Committee supporting Barrett’s nomination if she knew Barrett would later vote to overturn Roe v. Wade abortion protections.

On May 19, 2023, it was announced that she is withdrawing her name from consideration because of the opposition over her past support of Amy Coney Barrett.

== Personal life ==
Glover lives in Guilford, Connecticut.

== See also ==
- List of law clerks for the eighth seat of the Supreme Court of the United States
