= James N. Gardner =

American lawyer and author (1946–2021)

James Nelson Gardner (May 5, 1946 – April 10, 2021) was an American lawyer, author and lobbyist. He was also a complexity theorist and proposed a "Selfish Biocosm" hypothesis, which argues that intelligent life eventually emerges as the architect of baby universes.

Gardner was a graduate of Yale College and Yale Law School. He studied philosophy and theoretical biology. He was also an amateur cosmologist, and has published peer-reviewed articles which have been published in Complexity and the Journal of the British Interplanetary Society. He was also a former U.S. Supreme Court clerk and a former Oregon state senator.

Gardner died on April 10, 2021.

== Biocosm hypothesis ==
In the book Biocosm: The New Scientific Theory of Evolution: Intelligent Life Is the Architect of the Universe (2003) Gardner presented the "Selfish Biocosm Hypothesis" in which he says that there is a cycle of cosmic creation, in which highly evolved intelligences with a superior command of physics spawn one or more "baby universes," designed to be able to give birth to new, intelligent life. Thus, the ability of the present universe to support intelligent life as well as it does is not an accident, but the result of evolution in a long chain of the creation of more and more "bio-friendly" universes. Originally presented in peer-reviewed scientific journals, Gardener's "Selfish Biocosm" hypothesis proposes that life and intelligence have not emerged in a series of Darwinian accidents but are essentially hardwired into the cycle of cosmic creation, evolution, death, and rebirth. He argued that the destiny of highly evolved intelligence is to infuse the entire universe with life, eventually to accomplish the ultimate feat of cosmic reproduction by spawning one or more "baby universes," which will themselves be endowed with life generating properties.

== See also ==
- List of law clerks for the eighth seat of the Supreme Court of the United States
