= Ryan Dean Newman =

American lawyer

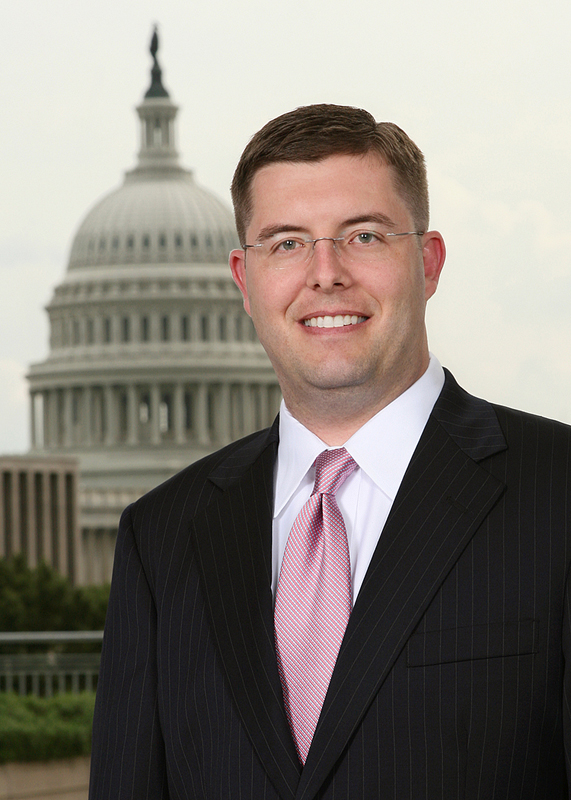

General Counsel for Governor Ron DeSantis
- Incumbent
- Assumed office October 2021

Personal details
- Born: New Mexico, U.S.
- Education: United States Military Academy (BS); University of Texas at Austin (JD)
- Awards: Bronze Star Medal

Ryan Dean Newman is an American lawyer and former United States Army captain. He currently serves as the general counsel to the Florida governor, Ron DeSantis. Prior to his current post, he was counselor to the attorney general for the United States Department of Justice. Previously he served as deputy general counsel for the United States Department of Defense, acting assistant attorney general and principal deputy assistant attorney general for the United States Department of Justice in the Office of Legal Policy. In March 2017, he was nominated by President Donald Trump to serve as General Counsel of the Army. The nomination was withdrawn in September 2017.

== Biography ==
Newman graduated from the United States Military Academy at West Point in 1998 with a B.S. in international politics. He served five years as an armor officer in the U.S. Army at Fort Hood, departing active duty after attaining the rank of captain. He was assigned to the 1st Squadron, 10th U.S. Cavalry Regiment, 4th Infantry Division. He served as a tank platoon leader, scout platoon leader, troop executive officer, and squadron adjutant. He deployed to Iraq in 2003 as a part of Operation Iraqi Freedom. He was awarded a Bronze Star Medal for his service in Iraq.

Newman began law school after completing his military service. He received a J.D. from the University of Texas School of Law in 2007. He was the chief notes editor of the Texas Law Review, associate editor of the Texas Review of Law and Politics, and president of his school's chapter of the Federalist Society. He clerked for United States Supreme Court Justice Samuel Alito from 2011 to 2012, Chief Judge James Larry Edmondson of the U.S. Court of Appeals for the Eleventh Circuit, and Judge Richard J. Leon of the U.S. District Court for the District of Columbia.

After law school, Newman served as chief counsel to U.S. Senator Ted Cruz and was an associate at Jones Day law firm. At Jones Day, Newman worked as a criminal defense attorney. He was part of the defense team for former Virginia Governor Bob McDonnell in federal corruption proceedings.

== See also ==
- List of law clerks for the eighth seat of the Supreme Court of the United States
