= Murder of Laurie Show =

1991 murder in Pennsylvania, US

- Location: 92 Black Oak Drive, Lancaster, Pennsylvania, U.S.
- Date: December 20, 1991
- Attack type: Stabbing
- Weapons: Knife; Ropes
- Victim: Laurie Michelle Show
- Perpetrators: Lisa Michelle Lambert; Tabitha Buck; Lawrence "Butch" Yunkin
- Motive: Revenge against Lambert over harassing Show due to dating Yunkin
- Convictions: Murder
- Sentence: Lambert: First-degree murder and life imprisonment without parole; Buck: Second-degree murder and life imprisonment without parole. Resentenced in 2017 to 28 years to life, granted parole in 2019; Yunkin: Third-degree murder and sentenced to 10 to 20 years in prison, paroled after 12 years

Laurie Show was a 16-year-old sophomore at Conestoga Valley High School who was stalked by her classmates and murdered on December 20, 1991. Her body was discovered by her mother, Hazel Show, in their Lancaster, Pennsylvania home, with her throat slit. Her classmates Lisa Michelle Lambert, Tabitha Buck, and Lawrence "Butch" Yunkin were subsequently charged with her murder.

== Stalking and murder ==
Lambert began harassing Laurie Show in 1991 after learning that Show had briefly dated Lawrence "Butch" Yunkin over the summer. Lambert and Yunkin had previously been in a relationship but were reportedly not dating during the time Yunkin was seeing Show. Show and Yunkin had gone on a few dates, with Show reporting to her mother that Yunkin had date-raped her. Shortly after his final date with Show, Yunkin resumed dating Lambert, who was pregnant with his child. Lambert, described as "obsessively jealous" of Show, proceeded to harass her in various ways, including appearing at Show's job and verbally assaulting her.

Tabitha Buck also had several altercations with Laurie Show. For instance, Buck saw Laurie at a mall, ran up to her, and began punching her repeatedly. Another attack occurred at their high school, and yet another incident happened at a fireman's ball when Buck jumped out of a moving vehicle and ran towards Laurie, intending to fight her. Lambert was very upset that Laurie was now dating her ex-boyfriend and that Laurie was spreading rumors about Buck, Lambert's friend, being gay.

Tabitha Buck was the only one among the three (Lambert, Yunkin, and Buck) who knew specific details about Laurie, such as what time the school bus arrived, what classes Laurie had, who her guidance counselor was, and how long it would take Laurie's mother to leave their home and get to the high school. Buck also had the opportunity to get Laurie's new phone number from the emergency contact sheet at their high school. Witnesses reported that Lambert had expressed an intent to "scare Laurie, then hurt her, then slit her throat."

The night before the murder, Lawrence Yunkin drove Lisa to a Kmart, where she went into the store and purchased rope, hats, and gloves. These items were then taken to the crime scene the following morning.

On December 20, 1991, Laurie Show was found fatally wounded in her home by her mother, Hazel Show. Police reported that Laurie had sustained "a five-inch gash to the throat; a stab wound that punctured a lung, another that grazed her spine; several wounds to the head; and over 28 defensive wounds." An autopsy revealed that her left common carotid artery had been severed. Hazel was not at home during the attack, having been tricked by the killers into going to the high school to speak with a guidance counselor. Hazel reported to the police that her daughter had named Lisa Michelle Lambert as her attacker, saying, "Michelle did it." Minutes later Show bled to death.

Police arrested Lisa Michelle Lambert, Lawrence Yunkin, and Tabitha Buck at a local bowling alley later that day for the murder of Laurie Show. While in custody, officers noticed fresh scratch marks on Buck's face and shoulders, as well as a few wounds on Yunkin. For such a violent crime, all three suspects were expected to have defensive wounds, but Lisa Lambert had none. Additionally, found in Tabitha Buck’s purse were Laurie's makeup items, including a powder compact and blue mascara, which she had stolen while fleeing the crime scene.

In their initial statements, the three claimed that Yunkin had dropped Lambert and Buck off at Show's house, where the two girls murdered Show. Yunkin stated that he had not participated in the murder, and while he was aware that Lambert and Buck planned to cut Show's hair with the knife as a prank, he provided them with an alibi and helped dispose of evidence. Later, Lambert and Buck recanted their initial statements, with Lambert alleging that Yunkin, whom she described as abusive, had encouraged her to harass and assault Show.

== 1992 trials ==
Lambert, Buck, and Yunkin were each tried in Lancaster County for the murder of Laurie Show. Yunkin agreed to testify against Lambert, stating that she and Buck had slit Show's throat after puncturing one of her lungs. The prosecution entered into evidence a pair of sweatpants that Lambert had worn during the crime, which were stained with Show's blood. Another piece of evidence was a letter from Lambert to Yunkin, in which she wrote, "I know I'm not an angel, but Lawrence, I never got mad enough to kill."

=== Verdicts ===
Lambert was convicted on July 20, 1992, of first-degree murder and criminal conspiracy in the death of Laurie Show. Buck was convicted on similar charges. Both young women were sentenced to life in prison without the possibility of parole. During her trial, Tabitha Buck claimed she didn't participate in the murder of Laurie Show. However, while Buck’s lawyer was making his closing statement, he held up her starter jacket to show the jury, unaware that inside the pocket was the missing piece of the knife that had broken off during the homicide.

Lambert was initially incarcerated at Cambridge Springs State Correctional Institution, while Buck was sent to Muncy State Correctional Institution. Yunkin received a sentence of 10 to 20 years. His deal for hindering apprehension was revoked after he was caught lying about a letter between himself and Lambert in which he asked her to cover for him and lie. The prosecutor, Jack Kenneff, who also prosecuted Lambert, hired an FBI handwriting expert to verify the letter's authenticity, leading to the revocation of Yunkin's deal. However, the prosecutor did not take remedial measures on behalf of Lambert and did not inform the court that his star witness, Lawrence Yunkin, had lied. Yunkin was granted parole on his third attempt and was released in 2003.

== 1997 re-trial ==
Lambert appealed her 1992 conviction and, in 1997, appeared in court for a federal habeas corpus hearing. U.S. District Judge Stewart Dalzell presided over the trial. Lambert's lawyers argued that there were several inconsistencies with the evidence and testimony presented in the earlier trial and maintained that Lambert was innocent. Lambert claimed she had been framed by Lancaster police officers to prevent her from coming forward with allegations that they had gang-raped her.

During the hearing, the defense presented several pieces of evidence, including the sweatpants previously introduced in the 1992 trial, which actually belonged to Lawrence Yunkin. The state had argued in the original trial that Lambert wore these sweatpants during the murder. However, a set of clothing that belonged to Lambert, which the defense claimed she had worn on the night of the murder, was submitted during the retrial and showed no traces of blood or evidence linking her to the crime. Additionally, correspondence between Lambert and Yunkin was presented, in which Yunkin admitted that he and Buck had killed Show and wanted Lambert to take the blame, believing she would receive a lighter sentence because she is female.

According to the Los Angeles Times, the police and prosecutors repeatedly contradicted themselves and their story, presenting evidence that U.S. District Judge Stewart Dalzell felt had been tampered with and edited by the state to secure a conviction against Lambert. One officer claimed not to have found a pink trash bag containing Yunkin's bloody socks and sneakers, while the defense produced a video showing the same officer finding the bag. Dalzell was also informed that a part of an earring belonging to Yunkin, which was discovered on Show's body, had been lost by the state.

On April 16, 1997, Hazel Show approached Judge Stewart Dalzell in his chambers, informing him that she had seen Lawrence Yunkin at the crime scene on the morning of the murder and had reported this to the police and prosecutor multiple times. She was told not to worry about her observation or her neighbor's statement, as they believed the neighbor would not be a reliable witness. The neighbor’s statement, which described seeing Yunkin and his car fleeing the crime scene, had been withheld from Lambert's original trial lawyers. On April 16, 1997, Judge Dalzell released Lisa Michelle Lambert into the custody of her attorneys while her hearing continued. Lambert's conviction was overturned, and she was found innocent on all counts on April 21, 1997. Judge Dalzell cited "prosecutorial misconduct" as the reason for the incorrect ruling.

Dalzell also barred the state of Pennsylvania from retrying Lambert. However, in January 1998, a federal appeals panel overturned Dalzell's ruling, stating that Lambert had "not yet exhausted her appeals in state court." As a result, Lambert was returned to prison.

== 1998 appeal ==
After Dalzell's ruling was overturned, the federal court system debated whether to keep Lambert in jail or to uphold Dalzell's verdict. Lambert filed an appeal for a hearing on the second overturning of the verdict but was denied. In February 1998, the Pennsylvania Supreme Court returned the case to the Lancaster County Court system, stating that Lambert "must first take up her claims [there]."

The third hearing took place in May 1998, with a federal appeals court agreeing to temporarily free Lambert under the belief that she would win her case. However, the attorney general filed a petition to stop Lambert's temporary release. The Third Circuit Court then agreed to release Lambert on a $1,000,000 bond, which was again blocked by the attorney general.

Judge Lawrence F. Stengel, who had presided over Lambert's trial in 1992, oversaw the proceedings. Judge Stengel appointed himself as Chief Fact Finder and did not allow all the evidence from the federal hearing to be presented. He also refused to allow Lambert's attorneys to introduce the same evidence from the federal hearing. Additionally, Judge Stengel placed a gag order on all involved after the press began asking numerous questions about the apparent abuse of power by the state. Lambert's lawyers criticized the situation, stating that imprisoning an innocent woman to save the county money was unconscionable and raised the level of misconduct to an unprecedented high.

Lambert testified that Yunkin had participated in the murders by choking Show. She also claimed that she had attempted to defend Show against the other two assailants and had tried to pull the victim out of the apartment. Limited evidence from the 1997 hearing was presented again. The defense argued that Lambert had not participated in the murder, that Yunkin had sent her out of the room, and that Lambert had obeyed Yunkin’s orders due to battered woman syndrome.

A previous boyfriend of Lambert's confirmed that he had witnessed Yunkin "yank [Lambert] into a room," where Yunkin began yelling at her. He also testified that he had seen a police officer, who matched one of the descriptions Lambert had given of her alleged rapists, give her a "threatening glare" at a local festival.

Lambert's lawyers presented correspondence between Lambert and Yunkin, which they claimed proved that Lambert had not been involved in the murder and that Yunkin had asked her to lie for him. They also questioned whether Show would have been able to speak to her mother before her death, given that her throat had been cut, and alleged that Show had written out the initials of her murderers, Buck and Yunkin.

Buck denied these claims, testifying that Lambert had actively participated in the murder and had instructed Buck to "wear her hair up and not to wear makeup or fingernail polish." Yunkin was later brought to the stand, and the sweatpants alleged to be his in the 1997 trial were produced. Yunkin was ordered to hold the sweatpants against his body, and they were shown to be too short for him and made of a different fabric from the garment entered into evidence in the 1992 trial.

A relative of Yunkin provided a poem supposedly written by Lambert while in jail, which was said to describe the murder. However, it was found that the poem was an old document typed during a typing class and discovered in Lawrence and Lisa's home after their arrest.

In August 1998, Judge Stengel announced his verdict, stating he would uphold the original guilty verdict against Lambert and that "even if he believed [her] story ... [she] would still be guilty of first-degree murder as an accomplice". Federal Judge Anita Brody later upheld this verdict. Lambert attempted to appeal the 1998 decision in 2003 and to bring the case to the Supreme Court of the United States, but was rejected both times. She exhausted her appeals in 2005.

== Aftermath ==
=== Anti-stalking activism ===
After her daughter died in 1991, Hazel Show began campaigning for stronger anti-stalking laws in Pennsylvania. The murder of her daughter helped advance anti-stalking legislation, and new laws were signed into effect in June 1993.

=== 1996 rape charges ===
In 2007, Lambert appeared in court to sue the correctional institution over claims that she was raped and assaulted by state prison staff in 1996. Lambert's lawyer argued that the institution had done nothing to prevent the assaults and that Lambert's conviction would impede her ability to receive a fair trial. Lambert received a $35,000 settlement, and the guard accused of assaulting her was sentenced to 1 1/2 to 3 years in prison.

=== Resentencing ===
On November 22, 2017, Buck was resentenced to a term of 28 years to life due to a Supreme Court ruling banning mandatory life sentences for juveniles. She was granted parole on December 21, 2019.

== Media ==
An hour-long special episode of 20/20 aired in February 1999, featuring interviews with several former classmates who claimed that Lambert had made death threats against Show. The episode also presented evidence that one of the officers who allegedly raped Lambert was on his honeymoon at the time of the alleged rape. The murder was also featured in a Season 8 episode of American Justice, titled "A Teenage Murder Mystery."

In 2000, the murder was adapted into a TV film titled The Stalking of Laurie Show (also known as Rivals outside of the U.S.). Directed by Norma Bailey, the film starred Jennifer Finnigan as Laurie Show. The film received poor critical reviews, with one journalist commenting that its depiction of both Laurie Show and Lambert distorted the true story.

In 2001, writer and journalist Lyn Riddle published Overkill, a true-crime book about Show's murder and the resulting trials of Lambert and her accomplices.

== See also ==
- Murder of John Lennon, 1980
- Murder of Rebecca Schaeffer, 1989
- Murder of Selena, 1995
- Ricardo López (attempted to murder Björk), 1996
- Murder of Christina Grimmie, 2016
