= Thomas Newman O'Neill Jr. =

American judge

Senior Judge of the United States District Court for the Eastern District of Pennsylvania
- In office July 6, 1996 – January 16, 2018

Judge of the United States District Court for the Eastern District of Pennsylvania
- In office August 5, 1983 – July 6, 1996
- Appointed by: Ronald Reagan
- Preceded by: Edward R. Becker
- Succeeded by: Petrese B. Tucker

Personal details
- Born: July 6, 1928 Hanover, Pennsylvania
- Died: January 16, 2018 (aged 89)
- Education: Catholic University of America (AB); University of Pennsylvania (LLB)

Thomas Newman O'Neill Jr. (July 6, 1928 – January 16, 2018) was a United States district judge of the United States District Court for the Eastern District of Pennsylvania.

== Education and career ==
Born in Hanover, Pennsylvania, O'Neill was in the United States Navy Reserve from 1948 to 1953. He received an Artium Baccalaureus from Catholic University of America in 1950 and a Bachelor of Laws from the University of Pennsylvania Law School in 1953. He was a law clerk to Judge Herbert Funk Goodrich of the United States Court of Appeals for the Third Circuit from 1953 to 1954, and to Justice Harold H. Burton of the Supreme Court of the United States from 1954 to 1955. He was a Fulbright Scholar at the London School of Economics from 1955 to 1956. Prior to his appointment to the United States District Court for the Eastern District of Pennsylvania, he was in private practice at Montgomery, McCracken, Walker & Rhoads, LLP in Philadelphia, Pennsylvania from 1956 to 1983, where he was a partner and chair of the litigation department. In 1976, O'Neill served as the Chancellor of the Philadelphia Bar Association.

== Federal judicial service ==
On June 21, 1983, O'Neill was nominated by President Ronald Reagan to a seat on the United States District Court for the Eastern District of Pennsylvania vacated by Judge Edward R. Becker. O'Neill was confirmed by the United States Senate on August 4, 1983, and received his commission on August 5, 1983. He assumed senior status on July 6, 1996. He died on January 16, 2018, at the age of 89.

== See also ==
- List of law clerks for the eighth seat of the Supreme Court of the United States

== Sources ==
Legal offices
Preceded by Edward R. Becker	Judge of the United States District Court for the Eastern District of Pennsylvania; 1983–1996	Succeeded by Petrese B. Tucker
