= Dennis M. Perluss =

American judge

Dennis M. Perluss (born May 12, 1948) was the Presiding Justice of the California Second District Court of Appeal, Division Seven, having been appointed to the post by Governor Gray Davis in 2003. He retired from the position on November 15, 2023.

Perluss received an A.B. from Stanford University in 1970 and a J.D. from Harvard Law School in 1973. From 1973–1974, he was a law clerk to U.S. Ninth Circuit Court of Appeals Judge Shirley Hufstedler. From 1974–1975, he was a law clerk to U.S. Supreme Court Justice Potter Stewart. After his clerkship ended, Perluss was an attorney, until 1999, when Governor Gray Davis appointed him to the Los Angeles County Superior Court. In 2001, Davis appointed him as an associate justice of the California Second District Court of Appeal, Division Seven and then elevated him to Presiding Justice in 2003.

Perluss and his wife, Rabbi Emily H. Feigenson, Chaplain at the Harvard-Westlake School, live in Los Angeles with their three children.

== See also ==
- List of law clerks for the eighth seat of the Supreme Court of the United States

Legal offices
Preceded by Mildred Lillie	Presiding Justice of the California Court of Appeal; Second District, Division Seven; January 10, 2003–present	Incumbent
Preceded by Richard C. Neal	Associate Justice of the California Court of Appeal; Second District, Division Seven; October 22, 2001 – January 10, 2003	Succeeded by Laurie D. Zelon
