= John W. Douglas =

American law clerk (1921–2010)

John Woolman Douglas (August 15, 1921 – June 2, 2010) was an American attorney and civil rights advocate, who pushed the cause in private practice and during the 1960s as a United States Assistant Attorney General.

== Early life ==
Douglas was born in Philadelphia, and later moved with his family to Chicago. His father, Paul Douglas, was an economics professor who would later represent Illinois in the United States Senate for three terms. His mother, Dorothy was an economics and sociology professor.

He earned his undergraduate degree in 1943 from Princeton University, where he received the Moses Taylor Pyne Honor Prize, the highest honor bestowed on an undergraduate. After leaving college he enlisted in the United States Navy, where he saw service during World War II as an officer on PT boats. After completing his military service he was awarded a degree in law from Yale Law School in 1948 and earned a doctorate in politics from the University of Oxford as a Rhodes Scholar in 1950.

After completing his degree at Oxford, he was a law clerk for Associate Justice of the Supreme Court of the United States Harold Hitz Burton in 1951 and 1952.

== Kennedy administration ==
During the presidency of John F. Kennedy, Douglas was part of a four-member committee that arranged for the release of Cuban exiles who had participated in the Bay of Pigs Invasion, negotiating a deal in which the 1,113 prisoners were released in exchange for food and medicine worth $53 million. He was later named as head of the United States Department of Justice Civil Division, where he was assigned by United States Attorney General Robert F. Kennedy to coordinate logistical and security considerations of the August 1963 March on Washington for Jobs and Freedom together with Bayard Rustin and other organizers of the event, an event that culminated with Martin Luther King Jr.'s "I Have a Dream" speech. Douglas bore responsibility for details of the march down to the level of ensuring the adequacy of portable toilets on the Mall. Victor S. Navasky, biographer of Robert F. Kennedy's Justice Department, stated that Douglas "shares historic credit for the orderliness and smoothness and joy of that day".

In 1966, he left the Department of Justice to work on his father's bid for a fourth term in the Senate, a race he lost to Republican Charles H. Percy. He co-chaired the efforts by the Lawyers' Committee for Civil Rights Under Law in the early 1970s to have volunteers ensure that schools in the South were integrating classes within schools. While with the law firm of Covington & Burling, he continued his advocacy work at the Washington Lawyers' Committee for Civil Rights and Urban Affairs, as president of the National Legal Aid and Defender Association and as chairman of the Carnegie Endowment for International Peace.

Douglas died at age 88, due to complications of a stroke in his home in Washington, D.C. He was survived by a daughter, a son, four grandchildren and a great-grandson. His wife, the former Mary St. John, died in 2007 after 62 years of marriage.

== See also ==
- List of law clerks for the eighth seat of the Supreme Court of the United States
