= John Setear =

John K. Setear
- Born: 1959 (age 66–67)
- Education: Williams College (BA); Yale University (JD)
- Occupation: Law professor at the University of Virginia School of Law
- Known for: Academic; Law professor

John Setear (born 1959) is a professor of International Law at the University of Virginia School of Law. Setear teaches courses in Contracts, Rules, Counterfactual History, the Civil War, the Cold War, and Baseball.

== Education ==
Setear is a graduate of Williams College and Yale Law School.

== Career ==
After law school, Setear served as a law clerk for Judge Carl E. McGowan of the United States Court of Appeals for the District of Columbia Circuit (1984-1985). He then clerked on the United States Supreme Court for Justice Sandra Day O'Connor (1985-1986). Setear worked at the RAND Corporation in the early 1990s, where his work focused on the use of war games and military simulations in defense analysis. His areas of scholarly interest include Foreign Relations Law, international whaling, and international climate agreements.

== See also ==
- List of law clerks for the eighth seat of the Supreme Court of the United States
