= Adam G. Ciongoli =

American lawyer (born 1968)

- Born: 1968 (age 57–58)
- Education: Georgetown University Law Center; University of Pennsylvania
- Occupation: Lawyer

Adam G. Ciongoli (born 1968) is a government and private lawyer, and was the Counselor to United States Attorney General John Ashcroft during the September 11, 2001 attacks and in the period that followed.

According to an October 2002 profile in Legal Times, Ciongoli grew up in Burlington, Vermont, the son of A. Kenneth Ciongoli, a neurologist and chairman of the National Italian American Foundation. Ciongoli attended the University of Pennsylvania, and graduated from Georgetown University Law Center in 1995. He began his legal career as a clerk for then-Judge Samuel Alito. on the United States Court of Appeals for the Third Circuit in Newark, New Jersey. After his clerkship, Ciongoli went to work for Kenneth Starr, Paul Cappuccio and other noted Republican lawyers in the Washington, DC office of Kirkland & Ellis. In 1999, he succeeded his friend and former Kirkland colleague, Paul Clement as the chief counsel to the United States Senate Constitution Subcommittee, which was chaired by then-Senator John Ashcroft.

After an unusual re-election defeat, Ashcroft was appointed Attorney General by President-elect George W. Bush, and took Ciongoli to the Justice Department with him. Ciongoli played a prominent role as the Attorney General's legal advisor, including participation in formulating the Patriot Act, and drafting the administration's order authorizing military commissions to try suspected terrorists and writing the subsequent regulations. In 2003, the White House Chief of Staff, Andy Card, named Ciongoli as the administration's chief liaison to the Independent 9/11 Commission; Some Democratic members of the Commission criticized Ciongoli for restricting the Commission's access to key people and documents.

After leaving the Justice Department later that year, Mr. Ciongoli became a senior vice president and general counsel at Time Warner Europe.

When his former boss, Judge Alito was nominated to the United States Supreme Court, Ciongoli played an active role in preparing Alito for his confirmation hearings In a surprising move, Ciongoli then left his lucrative corporate job to become one of the newly confirmed Justice Alito's law clerks. Justice Alito officiated Mr. Ciongoli's marriage in June 2006. Mr. Ciongoli went on to be general counsel of a number of well-known public companies post-clerkship, including Willis Group Holdings plc (2007-2012). Lincoln Financial Group (2012-2015), and General Counsel of the Campbell Soup Company. In December 2023, he joined Fox Corporation as its Chief Legal and Policy Officer.

== See also ==
- List of law clerks for the eighth seat of the Supreme Court of the United States
