= Mark A. Kearney =

American judge (born 1962)

Judge of the United States District Court for the Eastern District of Pennsylvania
- Incumbent
- Assumed office December 4, 2014
- Appointed by: Barack Obama
- Preceded by: J. Curtis Joyner

Personal details
- Born: 1962 (age 63–64) Philadelphia, Pennsylvania, U.S.
- Party: Democratic
- Education: Villanova University (BA, JD)

Mark A. Kearney (born 1962) is a United States district judge of the United States District Court for the Eastern District of Pennsylvania.

== Biography ==
Kearney received a Bachelor of Arts degree, cum laude, in 1984 from Villanova University. He received a Juris Doctor in 1987 from Villanova University School of Law. From 1987 to 1988, he served as a law clerk to Vice Chancellor Maurice A. Hartnett III of the Delaware Court of Chancery. He served as an associate at the law firm of Elliott, Mannino & Flaherty, P.C., from 1988 to 1990. From 1990 to 2014, he served at the law firm of Elliott, Greenleaf & Siedzikowski, P.C., in Blue Bell, Pennsylvania, serving as a shareholder from 1995 to 2014. He handled complex commercial litigation before both federal and state courts. He served as the 2009 President of the Montgomery Bar Association (Pennsylvania) as it celebrated 125 years of service and as the 2014-15 President of the Pennsylvania Bar Institute (the largest CLE provider on Pennsylvania law) as it recognized 50 years of providing continuing legal education. He was repeatedly recognized as Top 50 litigation star in Pennsylvania by Benchmark Litigation and received the honor of "Trial Lawyer of the Year" while in practice. He is a member of the Villanova Law School's Board of Consultors.

=== Federal judicial service ===
On June 16, 2014, President Barack Obama nominated Kearney to serve as a United States district judge of the United States District Court for the Eastern District of Pennsylvania, to the seat vacated by Judge J. Curtis Joyner, who assumed senior status on May 1, 2013. On July 24, 2014, a hearing before the United States Senate Committee on the Judiciary was held on his nomination. On September 18, 2014, his nomination was reported out of committee by a voice vote. On December 1, 2014, Senate Majority Leader Harry Reid filed for cloture on his nomination. On December 3, 2014, the United States Senate invoked cloture on his nomination by a 60–36 vote. He was confirmed later that day by voice vote. He received his judicial commission on December 4, 2014.

=== Notable cases ===
On February 19, 2016, Kearney issued a ruling in which he held that the First Amendment to the United States Constitution does not protect the right of citizens to film police activity in a public area. One commentator opined this ruling is contrary to a consistent line of cases at the federal and state level. Kearney explained the governing law in the Third Circuit did not allow him - as a trial judge - to recognize this new constitutional claim in the exceptionally narrow facts presented in the case. In July 2017, United States Court of Appeals for the Third Circuit Judge Thomas L. Ambro, joined by Judge L. Felipe Restrepo and partially by Judge Richard Lowell Nygaard, reversed Kearney's judgment but granted qualified immunity to the police officers involved.

Kearney also granted injunctions prohibiting state actors from treating female low risk inmates significantly different than male low risk inmates under the Equal Protection Clause and to stop Pennsylvania from interfering with the ongoing construction of the Scudder Falls Bridge in Bucks County under the Compact Clause.

In 2016, the court of appeals designated Kearney to hear over 70 cases in the Western District of Pennsylvania and in 2017, over 50 cases in the District of Delaware. Kearney has held businesses accountable for not being licensed to collect debt from a borrower under the Pennsylvania Consumer Credit Code and reviewed false advertisement claims against the Morgan and Morgan law firm's legal marketing strategy allegedly confusing Pennsylvanians as to who would be litigating on their behalf. He received national press complimenting his "model" handling of the antitrust case brought by Rockfon against Armstrong World Industries in the District of Delaware.

He held the Pennsylvania Supreme Court's Gallagher v. Geico decision is retroactive, allowing relief to insureds denied stacking benefits in their insurance policy. He also found a Fifth Amendment right not to be forced to reveal confidential telephone passcodes for investigatory purposes.

In the wake of the #MeToo era, Kearney denied a University's motion to dismiss a male professor's erroneous outcome claims based on anti-male bias. In a physical and emotional assault lawsuit brought by a porn star, Kearney denied reality star Josh Duggar's motion to compel Danica Dillion's disclosures.

In criminal cases, Kearney dismissed an indictment against two men because the prosecutors and agents waited too long to bring them to trial even though they knew where to find them for years before unsealing the indictment.

In April and July 2020, Kearney found a hotel franchisor could be liable for sex trafficking in its hotels and could turn and sue downstream franchisees and abusers accused of sex trafficking in company hotels in the same case. In one of the first cases in the country, his ruling addressed respective potential liabilities of hotels, local hotel franchise owners, and traffickers under the William Wilberforce Trafficking Victims Protection Reauthorization Act of 2008.

Under the False Claims Act, Kearney held an electricians union could recover over $1,000,000 for a contractor's false billing of electricians’ work efforts on a rail project funded by the United States and later awarded approximately $1.4 million in attorney fees to the union (reducing the request) after success for over a decade of litigation.

Kearney granted an employer's motion to dismiss a claim by a former employee who also served as a U.S. Naval reservist seeking paid leave for when he left work for short voluntary military service after exploring Congress's use of “defined benefits and seniority” guaranteed under the Uniformed Services Employment and Reemployment Rights Act.

In a monumental environmental case brought by Greenwich Terminals, Gloucester Terminals, and the Philadelphia Port Authority, Judge Kearney evaluated the sanctity of plans to dig a major port from the Delaware River. These port operators sued the United States Army Corps of Engineers and its officials under the Administrative Procedure Act, contesting the Corps’ issuance of dredging and construction permits for the Edgemoor Port Project on the Delaware River. The challengers alleged that the Corps failed to adequately consider the impacts of the project’s turning basin and maintenance dredging on river navigation and public safety and neglected to obtain a required Statement of No Objection from the Philadelphia Port Authority. Judge Kearney examined whether the Corps fulfilled their statutory duties under the Clean Water Act, the Rivers and Harbors Act, and its own procedural guidance. Judge Kearney’s review highlighted material flaws in the Corps’ reasoning, including their reliance on unverified data from the applicant, their failure to consider navigation and safety in the public interest review, and their unjustified departure from requiring a Statement of No Objection. Judge Kearney vacated both the section 404/10 permit and the section 408 authorization, instructing the Corps to reconsider the project in accordance with applicable law. This was a major decision for the economic and environmental impacts of the ports to Philadelphia.

In Joseph Jung et al. v. City of Philadelphia et al., Judge Kearney presided over a case in which seven vehicle owners sought to invalidate Philadelphia’s traffic camera enforcement schemes. Jung and others challenged the facial validity of Pennsylvania’s red light and speed camera statutes, and the Philadelphia Parking Authority’s issuance of violation notices under both substantive and procedural due process doctrines. Judge Kearney distinguished between legislative and executive action, demonstrating the statutes’ civil nature under the Mendoza-Martinez factors; explaining why neither the facial statutory presumptions nor the City’s form violation notices implicated any fundamental rights. Judge Kearney concluded that the $100–$150 fines were not constitutionally significant deprivations and the available appeal process which included administrative review and state court access, satisfied procedural due process. Judge Kearney dismissed Jung and others’ § 1983 claims with prejudice after two failed attempts to state a claim.

Judge Kearney navigated an employment discrimination case in Ionnae Alvarado-Jones v. Victoria's Secret Stores, LLC, where Ms. Alvarado-Jones alleged workplace sexual harassment, retaliation, and constructive discharge. While Ms. Alvarado-Jones reserved her Federal Title VII claims by timely filing with the EEOC, Ms. Alvarado-Jones failed to timely request dual filing with the Pennsylvania Human Relations Commission and neglected to file any complaint with the Philadelphia Commission on Human Relations. The employer moved to dismiss Ms. Alvarado-Jones’s state and municipal law claims. Applying § 9-1122, Judge Kearney reaffirmed the requirement of exhaustion before the Philadelphia Commission, insofar as the Philadelphia City Council’s procedural scheme forecloses attempts to later file with Philadelphia City Council after pursuing remedies elsewhere.

In 2025, Judge Kearney ruled that council officials of Yardley Borough, Bucks County, Pennsylvania, violated the First Amendment by deleting a Facebook comment posted by Mr. Earl Markey which criticized a sitting councilman. The borough argued qualified immunity, labelling the comment as a “personal attack”, that the online platform was meant for moderated discussions and it was not to be considered a public platform. Judge Kearney rejected the borough’s arguments, noting recent appellate court precedent which protected political speech on government run social media pages. Despite borough officials revising their policy, reimbursing Mr. Markey’s legal fees and offering to repost the comment, Judge Kearney held the deletion unconstitutional, reinforcing the right to criticize public officials in digital forums, holding local governments accountable for online censorship.

Legal offices
Preceded by J. Curtis Joyner	Judge of the United States District Court for the Eastern District of Pennsylvania; 2014–present	Incumbent
