= Lawrence F. Stengel =

American judge (born 1952)

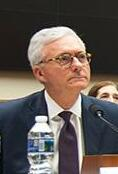
- Stengel in 2018

Chief Judge of the United States District Court for the Eastern District of Pennsylvania
- In office August 1, 2017 – August 1, 2018
- Preceded by: Petrese B. Tucker
- Succeeded by: Juan Ramon Sánchez

Judge of the United States District Court for the Eastern District of Pennsylvania
- In office June 21, 2004 – August 31, 2018
- Appointed by: George W. Bush
- Preceded by: Ronald L. Buckwalter
- Succeeded by: John Frank Murphy

Judge of the Court of Common Pleas for Lancaster County
- In office 1990 – June 2004
- Appointed by: Bob Casey Sr.
- Preceded by: Ronald L. Buckwalter

Personal details
- Born: Lawrence Francis Stengel; August 7, 1952 (age 72); Lancaster, Pennsylvania, U.S.
- Education: Saint Joseph's University (BA); University of Pittsburgh School of Law (JD)

Lawrence Francis Stengel (born August 7, 1952) is a former United States district judge of the United States District Court for the Eastern District of Pennsylvania.

== Education and career ==
Born in Lancaster, Pennsylvania, Stengel is the son of Lawrence E. Stengel (d. 2006), a lawyer. He received a Bachelor of Arts degree from Saint Joseph's University in 1974 and a Juris Doctor from the University of Pittsburgh School of Law in 1980. He was a teacher at Lancaster Catholic High School from 1974 to 1977. He was in private practice in Pittsburgh from 1980 to 1984, and in Lancaster from 1985 to 1990. He was a judge on the Lancaster County Court of Common Pleas from 1990 to 2004. He also teaches as an adjunct professor at Franklin & Marshall College from 1997 to present, and at Millersville University from 2000 to 2004.

=== Notable case ===
As a state judge, Stengel presided over the trial of Lisa Michelle Lambert for the murder of Laurie Show, a noteworthy case in Lancaster County history.

== Federal judicial service ==
On November 6, 2003, Stengel was nominated by President George W. Bush to a seat on the United States District Court for the Eastern District of Pennsylvania vacated by Ronald L. Buckwalter. Stengel was confirmed by the United States Senate on June 16, 2004, and received his commission on June 21, 2004. Stengel became Chief Judge of the District on August 1, 2017, and resigned from that position on August 1, 2018. Stengel retired from active service on August 31, 2018, and joined the Saxton and Stump law firm to lead their investigations and mediation group, Optimal Dispute Resolutions.

== Personal life ==
Stengel has been married twice. He has five children. He lives in East Hempfield Township, Pennsylvania; as a federal judge, he commuted to work at the James A. Byrne United States Courthouse in Philadelphia.

Legal offices
Preceded by Ronald L. Buckwalter	Judge of the United States District Court for the Eastern District of Pennsylvania; 2004–2018	Succeeded by John Frank Murphy
Preceded by Petrese B. Tucker	Chief Judge of the United States District Court for the Eastern District of Pennsylvania; 2017–2018	Succeeded by Juan Ramon Sánchez
