= J. Curtis Joyner =

American judge (born 1948)

Senior Judge of the United States District Court for the Eastern District of Pennsylvania
- In office May 1, 2013 – September 15, 2021

Chief Judge of the United States District Court for the Eastern District of Pennsylvania
- In office 2011–2013
- Preceded by: Harvey Bartle III
- Succeeded by: Petrese B. Tucker

Judge of the United States District Court for the Eastern District of Pennsylvania
- In office April 13, 1992 – May 1, 2013
- Appointed by: George H. W. Bush
- Preceded by: Seat established by 104 Stat. 5089
- Succeeded by: Mark A. Kearney

Judge of the Chester County Court of Common Pleas for the 15th Judicial District of Pennsylvania
- In office 1987–1992

Personal details
- Born: James Curtis Joyner; April 18, 1948 (age 78) Newberry, South Carolina
- Spouse: Mildred A. Carter
- Education: Central State University (BS); Howard University School of Law (JD)

James Curtis Joyner (born April 18, 1948) is a former United States district judge of the United States District Court for the Eastern District of Pennsylvania.

== Education and career ==
Born in Newberry, South Carolina, Joyner received a Bachelor of Science degree from Central State University in Ohio in 1971 and a Juris Doctor from Howard University School of Law in 1974. He also attended the National Judicial College at University of Nevada at Reno. He was a legal publications specialist, United States Office of the Federal Register, Washington, D.C. from 1974 to 1975. He was in private practice in West Chester Pennsylvania from 1975 to 1987. He was an assistant district attorney of Chester County, Pennsylvania from 1975 to 1980. He was a chief deputy district attorney of Chester County from 1980 to 1984, and first assistant district attorney of that jurisdiction from 1984 to 1987. He was a judge on the Court of Common Pleas, 15th Judicial District, Chester County, Pennsylvania from 1987 to 1992.

== Federal judicial service ==
On November 5, 1991, Joyner was nominated by President George H. W. Bush to a new seat on the United States District Court for the Eastern District of Pennsylvania created by 104 Stat. 5089. He was confirmed by the United States Senate on April 8, 1992, and received his commission on April 13, 1992. He served as Chief Judge from 2011 to 2013. He took senior status on May 1, 2013. Joyner retired from active service on September 15, 2021.

== See also ==
- List of African-American federal judges
- List of African-American jurists

== Sources ==
Legal offices
Preceded by Seat established by 104 Stat. 5089	Judge of the United States District Court for the Eastern District of Pennsylvania; 1992–2013	Succeeded by Mark A. Kearney
Preceded by Harvey Bartle III	Chief Judge of the United States District Court for the Eastern District of Pennsylvania; 2011–2013	Succeeded by Petrese B. Tucker
