= Ronald L. Buckwalter =

American judge (born 1936)

Ronald Lawrence Buckwalter
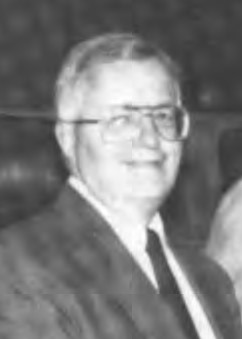

Senior Judge of the United States District Court for the Eastern District of Pennsylvania
- Incumbent
- Assumed office December 11, 2003

Judge of the United States District Court for the Eastern District of Pennsylvania
- In office March 12, 1990 – December 11, 2003
- Appointed by: George H. W. Bush
- Preceded by: Charles R. Weiner
- Succeeded by: Lawrence F. Stengel

Personal details
- Born: Ronald Lawrence Buckwalter; December 11, 1936 (age 89) Lancaster, Pennsylvania, U.S.
- Education: Franklin & Marshall College (BA); College of William & Mary (BCL)

Ronald Lawrence Buckwalter (born December 11, 1936) is an inactive senior United States district judge of the United States District Court for the Eastern District of Pennsylvania.

== Education and career ==
Buckwalter was born in Lancaster, Pennsylvania. He received an Artium Baccalaureus degree from Franklin and Marshall College in 1958 and a Bachelor of Civil Law from William & Mary School of Law in 1962. After a tour of active duty with the Pennsylvania Army National Guard, where he attained the rank of first lieutenant, he became a sole practitioner of law in Lancaster. Buckwalter was a legal aid attorney in Lancaster from 1964 to 1966, and then was a clerk to Judges John Bowman and Anthony Appel of the Court of Common Pleas in Lancaster County.

In 1971, as chief trial counsel, he formed a partnership with K.L. Shirk Jr. and Roger S. Reist. Buckwalter became an assistant district attorney for Lancaster County in 1970 and was district attorney from 1977 to 1980. He served as judge on the Court of Common Pleas from 1980 to 1990.

=== Federal judicial service ===
Buckwalter was nominated by President George H. W. Bush on November 17, 1989, to a seat on the United States District Court for the Eastern District of Pennsylvania vacated by Judge Charles R. Weiner. He was confirmed by the United States Senate on March 9, 1990, and received commission on March 12. Buckwalter assumed senior status on December 11, 2003.

=== Notable cases ===
Philadelphia Naval Shipyard: In 1991, in Dalton v. Specter, a case involving the closing of the Philadelphia Naval Shipyard, Buckwalter dismissed the lawsuit, saying the Defense Base Closure and Realignment Act of 1990 stripped the courts of jurisdiction. This case reached the U.S. Supreme Court in 1994, where Buckwalter's decision was affirmed.

Communications Decency Act: In 1996, Buckwalter was part of a three-judge panel, and as such, was one of the first jurists to consider the First Amendment status of the internet. In Reno v. American Civil Liberties Union, the three-judge panel included Buckwalter; Judge Stewart Dalzell, from the Eastern District; and Chief Judge Dolores Sloviter of the United States Court of Appeals for the Third Circuit. In this case, the panel ruled on the constitutionality of the Communications Decency Act (CDA) of 1996.

Congress had enacted the CDA to restrict and criminalize the transmission of "obscene or indecent" materials to minors. In three separate opinions, the three justices found two provisions of the CDA (sections 223[a] and sections 223[d]) to be unconstitutional because of their vagueness and their impact on internet communications with regard to the First Amendment and Fifth Amendment.

Buckwalter's opinion found that the word "indecent" was unconstitutionally vague, and the terms "in context" and "patently offensive" also were so vague as to violate the First and Fifth Amendments. To enforce these words would violate the "fundamental constitutional principle" of "simple fairness", as well as the First and Fifth Amendments.

In response to the government's argument that the two provisions in question would be applied only to "pornographic" materials and would not be applied to materials with serious value, Buckwalter found that the CDA itself did not support the government's argument. "Indecency has not been defined to exclude works of serious literary, artistic, political or scientific value, and therefore the Government's suggestion that it will not be used to prosecute publishers of such material is without foundation in the law itself."

After the district court's unanimous ruling that the CDA was unconstitutionally vague, the government appealed to the Supreme Court. The Supreme Court affirmed the lower court's rulings on June 18, 1997. A majority opinion, written by Justice Stevens, found the two provisions to be unconstitutionally vague and overbroad, and infringed upon the right to free expression. Justice Stevens was joined by six other Justices (Scalia, Kennedy, Souter, Thomas, Ginsburg, and Breyer) to affirm the decision in full. Justice O'Connor and Chief Justice Rehnquist concurred in the judgment in part and dissented in part.

NCAA's Proposition 16: Another case that gained national attention was Cureton v. National College Athletic Association (E.D.P.A 1999). In this summary judgment (March 8, 1999), Buckwalter discarded the NCAA's minimum test score requirement, as described in Proposition 16, in which incoming freshmen students were required to achieve a minimum score on either the SAT or ACT test as a condition of eligibility for freshmen athletics and/or athletically related financial aid.

Buckwalter found that Title VI of the Civil Rights Act of 1964 prohibited the NCAA's ineligibility rule because the rule had an unjustified disparate impact against African Americans. Buckwalter added that the NCAA's goal of improving graduation rates, which was the reason it instituted Proposition 16 in the first place, was not being served by the cutoff scores, and that meeting that goal could be achieved by other available methods.

Buckwalter's summary judgment went on appeal to the United States Court of Appeals for the Third Circuit, where it was reversed on December 22, 1999.

Fraud in the State Senate: In 2008, Buckwalter was assigned to preside over the corruption trial of Pennsylvania State Senator Vincent J. Fumo. The jury found Fumo guilty of fraud and obstruction of justice. In July 2009, Buckwalter sentenced Fumo to 55 months in prison and $2.7 million in fines. The prosecutors and some media outlets, including The Philadelphia Inquirer, criticized the sentence as too lenient. Portions of the judgment were remanded for re-sentencing by the Third Circuit Court of Appeals, by a 2-1 vote, after which Buckwalter increased the prison sentence to 61 months and increased the fines to $3.9 million.

In the re-sentencing, The Philadelphia Inquirer reported that Buckwalter stated that Fumo lacked "a true sense of remorse" and had a "complete lack of respect for our legal framework," but also noted that Fumo had not been accused of bribery, extortion, or a crime of violence. He stated the prosecution had overstepped Justice Department guidelines by charging the defendant with 137 criminal counts. Buckwalter varied from the federal advisory guidelines that called for a longer sentence, saying that the guidelines "did not fit the crimes". He pointed to Fumo's charitable acts when varying from the guidelines, saying that Fumo's charitable acts "neither justify nor excuse his crimes," but they did justify a variance from the guidelines.

== Sources ==
Legal offices
Preceded by Charles R. Weiner	Judge of the United States District Court for the Eastern District of Pennsylvania; 1990–2003	Succeeded by Lawrence F. Stengel
