= Benjamin W. Heineman Jr. =

American journalist and lawyer (born 1944)

- Born: 1944 (age 81–82)
- Occupations: Journalist, lawyer, government official, business executive, academic, and author

Academic background
- Education: Harvard College (BA); Oxford University (BLitt); Yale University (JD)

Benjamin Walter Heineman Jr. (born 1944) is an American journalist, lawyer, government official, business executive, academic and author. He is currently a Distinguished Senior Fellow at Harvard Law School's Program on the Legal Profession as well as Senior Fellow at the Belfer Center for Science and International Affairs at Harvard's Kennedy School of Government. He is also a lecturer at Yale Law School.

His works covers such subjects as law, government, public policy, international affairs, anti-corruption and integrity in large institutions. He has authored four books: The Inside Counsel Revolution: Resolving the Partner-Guardian Tension, High Performance with High Integrity, Memorandum for the President: A Strategic Approach to Domestic Affairs in the 1980s and The Politics of the Powerless: A Study of the Campaign Against Racial Discrimination.

Heineman is a Fellow of the American Academy of Arts and Sciences; a member of the American Philosophical Society; a member of the board of managers of Memorial Sloan Kettering Cancer Center; and a member of the board of Partners for Justice.

== Early life and education ==
Born in Chicago in 1944, Heineman received his elementary and secondary education at the University of Chicago Laboratory Schools. Heineman graduated magna cum laude with a Bachelor of Arts in history from Harvard College in 1965, where he was editorial chairman of the Harvard Crimson. A Rhodes Scholar, he received a Bachelor of Letters in political sociology in 1967 from Oxford University, where he was a student at Balliol College, and graduated with a Juris Doctor from Yale Law School in 1971, where he was editor-in-chief of the Yale Law Journal.

== Career ==
Heineman started his career as a reporter at the Chicago Sun-Times in 1968 where he covered, among other things, civil disturbances relating to SDS protests, gang wars, the assassination of Martin Luther King and police-protester confrontations at the Democratic National Convention. After law school, he became a law clerk to Associate Justice Potter Stewart at the United States Supreme Court from 1971 to 1972, a Term in which he worked for the Justice Stewart on landmark cases involving abortion, the death penalty, obscenity, press freedom and religious freedom. He was a staff attorney at a public interest law firm, the Center for Law and Social Policy, from 1973 until 1975, focusing on test case litigation to establish rights for those with disabilities. He was then a constitutional and general litigator at Williams, Connolly and Califano, representing the Washington Post on First Amendment cases, among other matters.

In 1977, he was named executive assistant to Joseph Califano, the secretary at the Department of Health for Education & Welfare, and served in that position until 1978, when he became the HEW Assistant Secretary for Planning and Evaluation. He worked on, among things, national health insurance, controlling health care costs, welfare reform, the Bakke case and other civil rights issues relating to racial equality and disability rights. In 1979–87, he worked in private law practice with most of his time spent at Sidley & Austin where he started the firms' Supreme Court practice with former Solicitor General Rex Lee and his partner Carter Phillips.

In 1987, General Electric CEO Jack Welch hired him as GE's senior vice president and general counsel. He served in that position from 1987 to 2003 and then as the senior vice president for law and public affairs until 2005, when he retired. Heineman is credited with transforming the role of General Counsel in the modern global corporation into a core member of the top management team. At GE, the following functions reported to him: law, environmental health and safety, public policy, tax and security and crisis management. He recruited senior lawyers from law firms and government to create an "inside" partnership composed of approximately 1400 lawyers. As he writes in The Inside Counsel Revolution, he sought, at GE, to make "the core mission of the corporation...the fusion of high performance with high integrity and sound risk management." In doing so, Heineman writes that the general counsel must be a "lawyer-statesman" who "must resolve the most basic problem confronting inside lawyers: being partner to the board of directors, CEO and business leaders but ultimately being guardian of the corporation." As further notes that, at GE, he sought to implement a "dramatic shift in power from outside law firms to inside law departments over both matters and money."

Heineman has been an occasional lecturer at Yale Law School since 2006 and he is a Distinguished Senior Fellow at Harvard Law School's Program on the Legal Profession and has been a senior fellow at its Program on Corporate Governance. He is Senior Fellow at the Belfer Center for Science and International Affairs at Harvard's Kennedy School of Government. He teaches at Harvard's Law School and Kennedy School.

He has been a member of the board of trustees of Central European University; the National Academy of Sciences Committee on Science, Technology and Law; the Board of Trustees, Committee for Economic Development; the Advisory Council for Millstein Center for Governance and Performance, Columbia Law and Business Schools; the External Advisory Group for World Bank Group's Governance and Anti-Corruption Strategy; the Independent Review Panel on World Bank Group's Department of Institutional Integrity; and the Board of Transparency International-USA., He is also a member of the Council on Foreign Relations, and the American Law Institute.

In February, 2025, Heineman's play, "Terror is the Order of the Day: A Tragedy of the French Revolution," was performed at the Flea Theater in New York City. Directed by Tea Alagic, the play covers one of the most dramatic and consequential periods in modern history: the downfall of King Louis XVI to the founding the First Republic to popular insurrections driving the Revolution to violence to implementation of the Terror to the downfall and execution of Robespierre. The play is a "societal" tragedy—the devolution of France from idealism to death and destruction---and an "ensemble" tragedy where the Revolution devours its children in execution and suicide driven by hatreds and rivalries carried out in the name of lawless law. The play has resonance for today's embittered and challenging political culture.

== Key themes in recent research and writing ==
Heineman has frequently written and lectured on business, law, public policy and international affairs. His work has been published by, inter alia, The Atlantic, The Washington Post, Yale Law Journal, Harvard Business Review, and Corporate Counsel.

In his latest book, The Inside Counsel Revolution: Resolving the Partner-Guardian Tension, Heineman describes the three fundamental roles of lawyers: expert technician, wise counselor, and lawyer as leader. He explains how in the past 30 years, general counsel have risen in power and status within the profession, becoming core members of top management and being intimately involved in complex, multi-faceted problem solving and strategy setting that involve a broad range of considerations in addition to law: ethics, reputation, risk management, public policy, politics, communications, citizenship and institutional structure and culture.

Heineman also argues that the emphasis in corporate governance debates on shareholders and directors is misplaced. He says that the most important dimension of governance is from the CEO down into the company. Only in that dimension of governance—not in the shareholder company relationship nor in the board-management relationship—can the essential systems, processes and resources be created and deployed on the core issues facing a corporation: high performance, high integrity, sound risk management and an overarching culture of integrity.

Heineman also argues that performance does not just involve economic performance but also performance with integrity on a range of business and society issues. He submits that the business in society dimensions of a corporation's activities have become ever more important and are essential to developing the trust among the corporation's varied constituencies that is key to corporate sustainability. Moreover, he maintains that corporations need systematic processes for prioritizing, analyzing and deciding on questions of ethics and the important subset of ethics—public policy (what ought public goods and public norms be). The corporate role in public policy must be broad-gauged and concerned about advancing genuine public interests not just private ones to create a strong, durable constitutional democracy which is necessary for business to thrive.

These are core ideas in basic courses Heineman teaches at law and public policy schools at Harvard and Yale, one on "Lawyers as Leaders" covering the role of general counsel in the private, public and non-profit sectors and a second on "Corporate Citizenship and Public Policy: Can Business Advance the Public Interest?" which explores the tensions inside companies between public and private interests.

== Awards and honors ==
- 1965–1967 – Rhodes Scholarship
- Fellow, American Academy of Arts and Science
- Member, American Philosophical Society
- Oliver Smithies Lectures–Balliol College
- "50 Top Innovators in Law in Past 50 Years," American Lawyer Magazine
- "100 Most Influential People in Business Ethics," Ethisphere Magazine
- "100 Best Lawyers in America," National Law Journal
- Lifetime Achievement Award, American Lawyer Magazine
- Lifetime Achievement Award, board member Magazine
- Scales of Justice Award, Equal Justice Works (National Council on Public Interest Law)
- National Legal Aid and Defenders Association Exemplar Award
- GE chairman's Leadership Award
- Excellence in Corporate Practice Award, American Corporate Counsel Association
- Public Service Award, ABA-Section of Business Law

== Personal life ==
Heineman's father, Ben Heineman, Sr. was a businessman and civic leader, who was chairman and CEO of Northwest Industries and headed Federal, State and local task forces on such subjects as civil rights, income maintenance, higher education and fair housing. His mother was a social worker and later led many local and national civic and charitable organizations; she was the first woman president of the Chicago Child Care Society and was also the president of the Child Welfare League of America. His wife, Cristine Russell, former national health and science reporter for the Washington Star and then the Washington Post, is a Senior Fellow at Harvard Kennedy School's environment and natural resources program. They have two sons, Zachary, an architect and entrepreneur, and Matthew, a documentary filmmaker, who has won Directors Guild of America best documentary feature twice and three Emmys and been nominated for the Academy Award for best documentary feature.

== Bibliography ==
- The Inside Counsel Revolution: Resolving the Partner-Guardian Tension (Ankerwycke/American Bar Association 2016) ISBN 9781634252799
- High Performance with High Integrity (Harvard Business School Press 2008) ISBN 9781422122952
- Memorandum for the President: A Strategic Approach to Domestic Affairs in the 1980s (Random House 1981) ISBN 9780394513652
- The Politics of the Powerless: A Study of the Campaign Against Racial Discrimination (Oxford University Press 1972) ISBN 9780192181787

== See also ==
- List of law clerks for the eighth seat of the Supreme Court of the United States
