= RonNell Andersen Jones =

American journalist; law professor

- Occupations: Journalist; Lawyer

Academic background
- Education: Utah State University (BA); Ohio State University Moritz College of Law (JD)

RonNell Andersen Jones is an American legal scholar who is the Lee E. Teitelbaum endowed professor of law and Associate Dean of Faculty and Research at the S.J. Quinney College of Law at the University of Utah. She is also an Affiliated Fellow at Yale Law School's Information Society Project. Previously, Jones was a law professor and Associate Dean of Academic Affairs and Research at the J. Reuben Clark Law School at Brigham Young University, where she was twice named Professor of the Year. Jones has previously been a reporter employed by the Deseret News and she specializes in the study of the integration of the press, the law, and the courts.

== Early life and career ==
Jones was born in Tremonton, Utah. Jones has a bachelor's degree from Utah State University and earned her J.D. at the Ohio State University, where she graduated first in her class, summa cum laude. She has been a lecturer on media law at Ohio Wesleyan University and was a distinguished faculty fellow at the University of Arizona before joining the faculty of BYU.

Jones was a law clerk for Sandra Day O'Connor as well as for William A. Fletcher of the 9th Circuit Court of Appeals.

== See also ==
- List of law clerks for the eighth seat of the Supreme Court of the United States

== Sources ==
- Deseret News, Feb. 24, 2009
- BYU Law School bio
- University of Arizona listing
