= Dolores Sloviter =

American judge (1932–2022)

Dolores Korman Sloviter
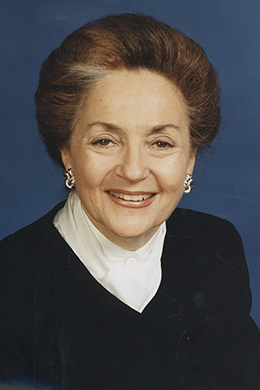

Senior Judge of the United States Court of Appeals for the Third Circuit
- In office June 21, 2013 – October 12, 2022

Chief Judge of the United States Court of Appeals for the Third Circuit
- In office February 1, 1991 – January 31, 1998
- Preceded by: A. Leon Higginbotham Jr.
- Succeeded by: Edward R. Becker

Judge of the United States Court of Appeals for the Third Circuit
- In office June 21, 1979 – June 21, 2013
- Appointed by: Jimmy Carter
- Preceded by: Seat established by 92 Stat. 1629
- Succeeded by: Cheryl Ann Krause

Personal details
- Born: September 5, 1932 Philadelphia, Pennsylvania, U.S.
- Died: October 12, 2022 (aged 90) Wynnewood, Pennsylvania, U.S.
- Education: Temple University (BA); University of Pennsylvania (LLB)

Dolores Korman Sloviter (September 5, 1932 – October 12, 2022) was a United States circuit judge of the United States Court of Appeals for the Third Circuit.

== Education and career ==
Born to a Jewish-American family in 1932 in Philadelphia, Pennsylvania, Sloviter attended Philadelphia High School for Girls. She graduated from Temple University in 1953 with a bachelor's degree and received her Bachelor of Laws in 1956 from the University of Pennsylvania Law School, where she served as a Comments Editor of the University of Pennsylvania Law Review. She was a law clerk for the City of Philadelphia Law Department in 1955. Sloviter was in private law practice in Philadelphia until she became an associate professor of law at Temple University Beasley School of Law in 1972 and a professor of law at Temple in 1974, serving until 1979.

== Federal judicial service ==
Sloviter was nominated by President Jimmy Carter on April 4, 1979, to the United States Court of Appeals for the Third Circuit, to a new seat created by 92 Stat. 1629. She was confirmed by the United States Senate on June 19, 1979, and received her commission on June 21, 1979, becoming the first woman to serve on the Third Circuit and the fourth woman to serve on a United States Court of Appeals. She served as Chief Judge from 1991 to 1998. Sloviter assumed senior status on June 21, 2013, the 34th anniversary of her appointment to the bench. Although Sloviter had been eligible to take senior status for some time, she long opted not to do so, preferring instead to remain an "active" judge, with a full caseload and full voting rights. On April 4, 2016, then-Chief Judge Theodore McKee announced that Judge Sloviter would assume "inactive status" and stop hearing cases due to a serious medical condition, but she would remain active within the court's committees. Sloviter died on October 12, 2022, at the age of 90.

== Notable case ==
In 1996, Sloviter was a member of a three-judge panel of the Eastern District of Pennsylvania which heard a challenge to the Communications Decency Act, Title V of the Telecommunications Act of 1996, on grounds that it abridged the free speech provisions of the First Amendment. On June 12, 1996, their decision blocked enforcement of the act, ruling that it was unconstitutional, in addition to being unworkable and impractical from a technical standpoint. The "Findings of Fact" document — written for the case by Judges Sloviter, Ronald L. Buckwalter, and Stewart Dalzell — was posted on the Internet and cited as a lucid introduction to the Internet and related software. The U.S. Supreme Court upheld their ruling on June 18, 1997, in Reno v. ACLU.

== Book ==
In 2007, one of her former clerks, Saira Rao, published a book commonly assumed to be based on the author's experience working for Sloviter.

== See also ==
- List of Jewish American jurists
- List of United States federal judges by longevity of service

== Sources ==
- Lewis, Peter H. "Personal Computers: An Internet Primer by 3 Newbies". The New York Times. June 18, 1996. p. C11.

Legal offices
Preceded by Seat established by 92 Stat. 1629	Judge of the United States Court of Appeals for the Third Circuit; 1979–2013	Succeeded by Cheryl Ann Krause
Preceded by A. Leon Higginbotham Jr.	Chief Judge of the United States Court of Appeals for the Third Circuit; 1991–1998	Succeeded by Edward R. Becker
