= Marci Hamilton =

American legal scholar and child welfare activist

Marci A. Hamilton
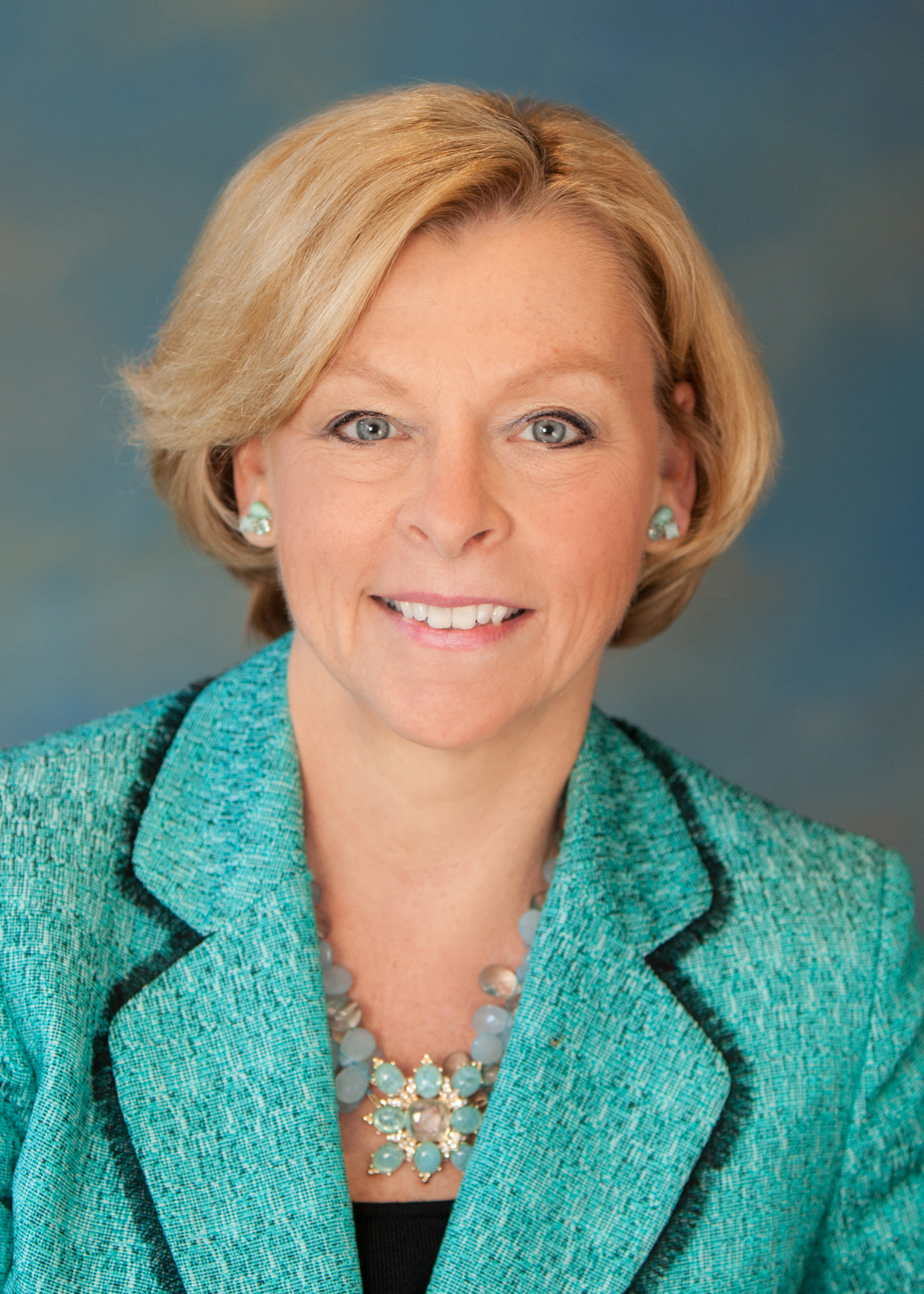
- CEO and Academic Director, CHILD USA
- Born: July 22, 1957 (age 69)
- Education: Vanderbilt University, Pennsylvania State University, University of Pennsylvania School of Law
- Occupations: Constitutional Law, First Amendment, Religion and the Law
- Website: www.childusa.org

Marci Ann Hamilton (born July 22, 1957) is the chief executive officer and academic director at Child USA, an interdisciplinary think tank to prevent child abuse and neglect. She is also a scholar of constitutional law and Robert A. Fox Leadership Program Distinguished Scholar and Professor of Practice at University of Pennsylvania with dual appointments to Department of Political Science in Penn's College and Graduate School and Penn's Law School. She is an advocate for the enforcement of the Establishment Clause of the United States Constitution. Hamilton also promotes adequate protection for minors, individuals and landowners who suffer as a result of actions which are claimed to be constitutionally protected on religious grounds. Hamilton is critical of provisions within Federal and State Religious Freedom Restoration Acts.

== Background and ideas ==
Hamilton received her Bachelor of Arts degree from Vanderbilt University in 1979. She then earned a master's degree at Pennsylvania State University and a juris doctor from the University of Pennsylvania Law School, where she was editor-in-chief of the Law Review.

Hamilton served as a law clerk for Justice Sandra Day O'Connor of the Supreme Court of the United States and Chief Judge Edward R. Becker of the United States Court of Appeals for the Third Circuit.

She was the lead counsel for the city of Boerne, Texas, in Boerne v. Flores before the U.S. Supreme Court.

Hamilton is a critic of the Utah Attorney General's office for not vigorously prosecuting polygamists in the state. She indicated that arguments against prosecution based on due process violations and alleged violations of religious freedom had no merit. However, this position has been criticized as one based on legal theory that ignores the reality of limited amounts of evidence and limited government resources.

Hamilton is vocal about her standing as a religious believer and cites examples where religion is a significant benefit to human society. She further asserts that religious liberty deserves accommodation as long as such accommodation complies with the "no harm principle". Hamilton argues that state and church separation are vital to religious liberty. She bases this contention on the record of religious diversity among the framers of the constitution and their distrust of government sanctioned religion in the "old world". Hamilton is critical of legislation that is passed under the guise of protecting religious liberty while, in her opinion, creating unintended and unreasonable consequences.

In 2015, Hamilton received the Religious Liberty Award from the American Humanist Association.

In 2016, Hamilton founded Child USA, a Philadelphia-based nonprofit think tank that provides scholarship on issues of child abuse and medical neglect. Child USA brings together educators and students to uncover the hidden and false assumptions that are endangering children. The think tank works to study the issues, track societal and legislative responses and trends, provide expert testimony to explain the issues to legislators and policymakers, and to educate the public. Hamilton currently serves as the chief executive officer and Academic Director.

== Advocacy ==
Hamilton advocates limiting legal exemptions on religious grounds, with the intended purpose of creating greater protection for individuals who may face:

1. Clergy abuse from within the Roman Catholic Church, the Jehovah's Witnesses, the Fundamental Church of Jesus Christ of Latter Day Saints and other religious organizations.
2. Medical neglect and denial of science-based medicine for minor children by such groups as Christian Scientists and others, when the parents claim religious grounds for such denial.
3. Abuse brought upon women as result of plural or polygamous marriage.
4. Denial of federally mandated medical insurance provisions for employees as a result of employer's claims of religious exemption.
5. Unreasonable disruptions to residential neighborhoods due to religious groups' claims of exemption from zoning laws.

== Media appearances ==
Hamilton appeared on The Daily Show in 2005 to discuss her book God vs. the Gavel. In this interview she highlights the existence of laws that offer criminal and civil protection for those who seek "faith healing" rather than traditional medicine for those under their care. She also notes the public cost of litigation to defend against claims of prisoners seeking unique religious accommodation.

Hamilton has also made appearances on Anderson, Good Morning America, The Today Show, Lou Dobbs Tonight, The Center For Inquiry's Point of Inquiry Podcast, The O'Reilly Factor as well as local news stations.

== Selected publications ==
- God vs. the Gavel (2007), ISBN 0-521-70338-7
- Justice Denied (2008, 2012), ISBN 0-521-88621-X
- Fundamentalism, Politics, and the Law (2011), Co-Edited with Mark J. Rozell, ISBN 978-0-230-11063-2

== See also ==
- List of law clerks for the eighth seat of the Supreme Court of the United States
