= Petrese B. Tucker =

American judge (born 1951)

Senior Judge of the United States District Court for the Eastern District of Pennsylvania
- Incumbent
- Assumed office June 1, 2021

Chief Judge of the United States District Court for the Eastern District of Pennsylvania
- In office May 1, 2013 – July 31, 2017
- Preceded by: J. Curtis Joyner
- Succeeded by: Lawrence F. Stengel

Judge of the United States District Court for the Eastern District of Pennsylvania
- In office June 1, 2000 – June 1, 2021
- Appointed by: Bill Clinton
- Preceded by: Thomas Newman O'Neill Jr.
- Succeeded by: Kelley B. Hodge

Personal details
- Born: Petrese Debré Brown; May 27, 1951 (age 74) Philadelphia, Pennsylvania, U.S.
- Education: Temple University (BA, JD)

Petrese Debré Brown Tucker (born May 27, 1951) is a senior United States district judge of the United States District Court for the Eastern District of Pennsylvania.

== Education and career ==
Tucker was born in Philadelphia. She received a Bachelor of Arts degree from Temple University in 1973 and a Juris Doctor from Temple University School of Law in 1976. She was a law clerk for Judge Lawrence Prattis of the Common Pleas Court from 1976 to 1978. She was in private practice in Pennsylvania from 1977 to 1978. She was an Assistant District Attorney of Philadelphia, District Attorney Office from 1978 to 1986. She was an adjunct professor, Great Lakes Colleges Association from 1984 to 1985. She was a senior trial attorney of Southeastern Transportation Authority Legal Department from 1986 to 1987. She was a judge on the Court of Common Pleas, Commonwealth of Pennsylvania from 1987 to 2000.

=== Federal judicial service ===
On July 27, 1999, Tucker was nominated by President Bill Clinton to a seat on the United States District Court for the Eastern District of Pennsylvania vacated by Judge Thomas N. O'Neill, Jr. She was confirmed by the United States Senate on May 24, 2000, and received her commission on June 1, 2000. Tucker served as the first woman and first African-American woman Chief Judge of the District starting on May 1, 2013, and she served in this position until July 31, 2017. She assumed senior status on June 1, 2021.

== See also ==
- List of African-American federal judges
- List of African-American jurists
- List of first women lawyers and judges in Pennsylvania

== Sources ==
Legal offices
Preceded by Thomas Newman O'Neill, Jr.	Judge of the United States District Court for the Eastern District of Pennsylvania; 2000–2021	Succeeded by Kelley B. Hodge
Preceded by J. Curtis Joyner	Chief Judge of the United States District Court for the Eastern District of Pennsylvania; 2013–2017	Succeeded by Lawrence F. Stengel
