= Ivan K. Fong =

American attorney

Ivan Fong
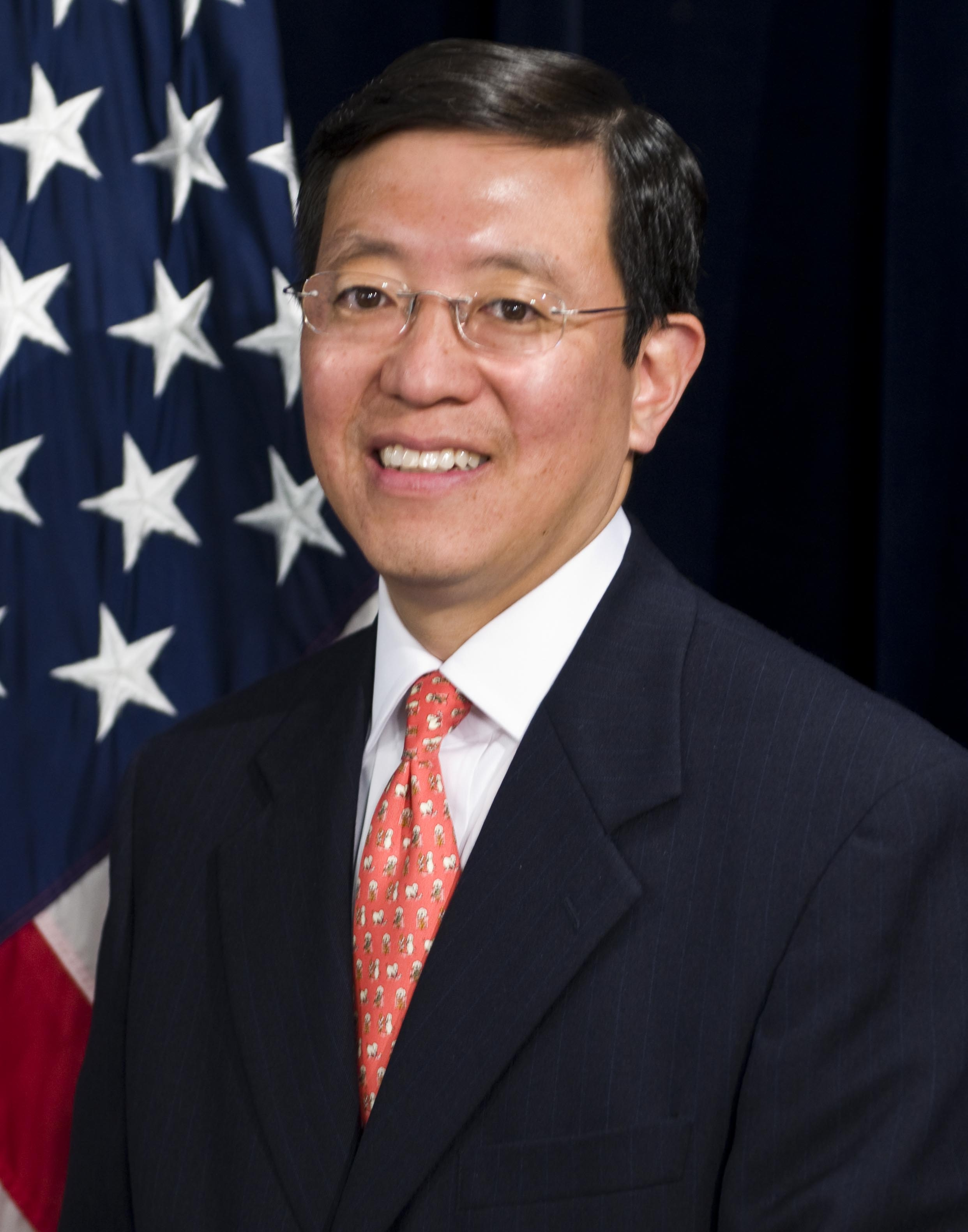

General Counsel of the United States Department of Homeland Security
- In office May 2009 – October 2012
- President: Barack Obama
- Preceded by: David Martin (acting)
- Succeeded by: John Sandweg (acting)

Personal details
- Born: Ivan Kenneth Fong; August 3, 1961 (age 64) New York City, New York, U.S.
- Party: Democratic
- Spouse: Sharon Ty
- Education: Massachusetts Institute of Technology (BS, MS); Stanford University (JD); University of Oxford (BCL)

Ivan Kenneth Fong (born August 3, 1961) is an American attorney who was general counsel for the Department of Homeland Security. He was general counsel of 3M company from October 2012 until February 2022, when he became executive vice president, general counsel and secretary at Medtronic.

Ivan K. Fong
- Chinese: 方富宇
Transcriptions
Standard Mandarin
- Hanyu Pinyin: Fāng Fùyǔ

== Education ==
Fong earned a bachelor's in chemical engineering and a master's in chemical engineering practice from Massachusetts Institute of Technology. He went on to Stanford Law School where he was President of the Stanford Law Review and graduated with a juris doctor with honors in 1987. He was awarded a Fulbright Scholarship and studied at Oxford, earning a Bachelor of Civil Law (a graduate degree) with first class honours.

== Career ==
He was a law clerk to Judge Abner J. Mikva of the U.S. Court of Appeals for the D.C. Circuit and then became a clerk to Justice Sandra Day O'Connor of the United States Supreme Court from 1989 to 1990.

In the private sector, he was general counsel of GE Vendor Financial Services and later joined Cardinal Health in 2005 as chief legal officer. A National Law Journal profile credits him with reorganizing the legal department of Cardinal and clearing a docket swamped by two dozen major lawsuits.

He was sworn in as general counsel of Homeland Security in May 2009.

He was hired as Senior Vice President, Legal Affairs and General Counsel of The 3M Company, on October 15, 2012.

== See also ==
- List of law clerks for the eighth seat of the Supreme Court of the United States
