= Raymond S. Troubh =

American businessman (1926–2020)

- Born: May 3, 1926
- Died: August 24, 2020 (aged 94)
- Education: Yale Law School; Bowdoin College

Raymond S. Troubh (May 3, 1926 – August 24, 2020) was an independent financial consultant who served as a general partner at Lazard from 1961 to 1974 and as interim chairman at Enron from 2002 to 2004.

== Career ==
Troubh graduated from Bowdoin College in 1950 and earned his law degree from Yale Law School in 1952. Early in his legal career he clerked for U.S. Supreme Court Justice Harold Hitz Burton. From 1954 to 1958, he was an associate in the firm, Sullivan and Cromwell, in New York. He was treasurer of the Lazard Fund from 1958 to 1960, associate with Lazard Freres & Co. from 1961 to 1968, and partner in that firm from 1968 to 1974. In 1974 he founded Troubh & Co., a financial consulting firm.

He was a former governor of the American Stock Exchange and has a long record of service on corporate boards. In November 2001, he was called upon to be a member of the board at Enron and to be one of three members investigating corporate misconduct at Enron. Director's Alert named him one of nine Outstanding Directors in Corporate America 2002 "for lending a steady, cool and honest hand to boardrooms across corporate America in times of turmoil, most particularly in guiding Enron through crisis."

== See also ==
- List of law clerks for the eighth seat of the Supreme Court of the United States
