= Edward R. Becker =

American judge (1933–2006)

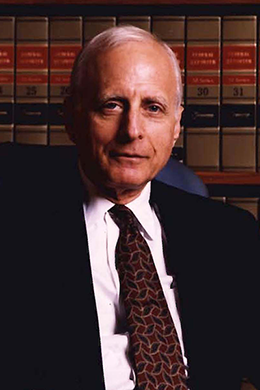

Senior Judge of the United States Court of Appeals for the Third Circuit
- In office May 4, 2003 – May 19, 2006

Chief Judge of United States Court of Appeals for the Third Circuit
- In office 1998–2003
- Preceded by: Dolores Sloviter
- Succeeded by: Anthony Joseph Scirica

Judge of the United States Court of Appeals for the Third Circuit
- In office December 3, 1981 – May 4, 2003
- Appointed by: Ronald Reagan
- Preceded by: Max Rosenn
- Succeeded by: Franklin Van Antwerpen

Judge of the United States District Court for the Eastern District of Pennsylvania
- In office October 14, 1970 – January 22, 1982
- Appointed by: Richard Nixon
- Preceded by: Seat established by 84 Stat. 294
- Succeeded by: Thomas Newman O'Neill Jr.

Personal details
- Born: Edward Roy Becker; May 4, 1933 Philadelphia, Pennsylvania, U.S.
- Died: May 19, 2006 (aged 73) Philadelphia, Pennsylvania, U.S.
- Education: University of Pennsylvania (BA); Yale University (LLB)

Edward Roy Becker (May 4, 1933 – May 19, 2006) was a United States circuit judge of the United States Court of Appeals for the Third Circuit and a United States district judge of the United States District Court for the Eastern District of Pennsylvania.

== Education and career ==
Born in Philadelphia, Pennsylvania, Becker received his Bachelor of Arts degree from the University of Pennsylvania in 1954, and his Bachelor of Laws from Yale Law School in 1957. He had a private law practice in Philadelphia from 1957 to 1970.

== Judicial appointments ==
Becker's career as a federal judge began with his nomination to the U.S. District Court for the Eastern District of Pennsylvania. He was nominated by President Richard M. Nixon on September 24, 1970 to a new seat created by 84 Stat. 294, was confirmed by the United States Senate on October 8, 1970 and received his commission on October 14, 1970. His service terminated on January 22, 1982 due to his elevation to the Third Circuit.

Ronald Reagan nominated Becker on November 16, 1981 to the Third Circuit seat vacated by Max Rosenn. Becker was confirmed by the Senate on December 3, 1981 and received his commission on the same day. He served as Chief Judge from 1998 to 2003. He assumed senior status on May 4, 2003.

== Judicial style and cases ==
Becker was known for the case Mackensworth v. American Trading Transportation Co. a decision that he wrote in verse. He was also known for occasionally inserting humor into judicial rulings.

In 1977 Becker was assigned the massive Japanese Electronic Products Antitrust Litigation in which Zenith Radio Corp. and National Union Electric ("N.U.E.") sought billions of dollars in damages against most of the Japanese television manufacturers and two American companies, Sears, Roebuck and Co. and Motorola. The case had been pending since 1970 when it was first filed by N.U.E. and had been in the hands of a number of federal court judges. The case had languished and Becker began to work to get this case to trial. In 1981, Becker entered summary judgment for all defendants on the antitrust and antidumping claims and dismissed the lawsuits. Plaintiffs appealed and the appellate court reversed Becker's rulings in favor of the Japanese manufacturers on the antitrust claims, but affirmed the summary judgment for Sears, Roebuck and Co., Motorola, Inc. and Sony. In March, 1986 the Supreme Court of the United States affirmed Becker's ruling in favor of the defendants on Zenith's antitrust claims.

In 2003, Becker authored the decision on Freethought Society of Greater Philadelphia v. Chester County, ruling that the display of Ten Commandments outside of a courthouse of Chester County did not violate the Establishment Clause of the First Amendment.

Becker was known for his humility and humanity; clerks were told to come up with strong arguments against his positions and not merely defer to him. He commuted by train for nearly his entire career, often reading cases along the way. His law clerks accompanied him during afternoon walks to visit his elderly mother in center city, discussing cases along the way and back. He was active in civic affairs, including some involvement in the relocation of the Liberty Bell.

== Personal life and family ==
Becker spent virtually all of his life in and around the city of Philadelphia. His father was a lawyer and his wife, Flora, was also a judge, and two of their three children are also lawyers. One of his sons, Jonathan, became a teacher, while another son, Charles (Chip) Becker, became a lawyer in private practice and daughter Susan has worked for the United States Attorney's Office for the Eastern District of Pennsylvania. His parents, wife, and friends generally called him Eddie. He was a fan of the Sixers basketball team.

He was an expert piano player; a former law clerk of his recruited him to become the pianist for Chief Justice Rehnquist's annual all-court sing-along.

== Legacy ==
The lobby at the James A. Byrne United States Courthouse in Philadelphia is named in Becker's honor. The block of Chestnut Street that runs from Fifth Street to Sixth Street, between the Liberty Bell and Independence Hall, is marked as Judge Edward R. Becker Way, in recognition of his leadership in the campaign to keep the National Park Service from closing that block to public access in the wake of 9/11.

=== Funeral ===
Becker died of prostate cancer on May 19, 2006. Eulogies were delivered by Senator Arlen Specter, recently confirmed Supreme Court Justice (and former Third Circuit judge) Samuel Alito, Third Circuit Court colleagues Chief Judge Anthony Scirica, Judge Midge Rendell, and by Stephen J. Harmelin, managing director of Dilworth Paxson. U.S. Supreme Court Justices Antonin Scalia and David Souter, as well as Justice Alito and Pennsylvania Governor Ed Rendell attended the ceremony.

=== Citizenship Award ===
After his death, the Fox Rothschild Center for Law and Society of the Community College of Philadelphia created the Judge Edward R. Becker Citizenship Award. Recipients have included:

- 2007: Senator Arlen Specter, a friend of Judge Becker's from law school days
- 2008: William T. Coleman, Jr., civil rights attorney and former U.S. Transportation Secretary
- 2009: Sister Mary Scullion, advocate for the homeless
- 2010: Marjorie O. Rendell, First Lady of Pennsylvania, federal judge and former colleague of Becker's.
- 2011: Edward G. Rendell, former Governor of Pennsylvania. The award ceremony was delayed due to inclement weather.
- 2012: Senator Robert P. Casey, Jr. was supposed to receive the award, but the ceremony was postponed because it was feared that it would be a focus for political demonstrations relating to an ongoing labor dispute at the college. Inclement weather in 2013 postponed the ceremony again, and in 2014, Senator Casey did receive the Award.
- 2015: Honorable Samuel Alito, Associate Justice of the Supreme Court of the United States

The award is generally presented by Judge Becker's son, Chip, in the early part of the year, February through April.

=== Law Clerks ===
Among his law clerks were:

- Newtown Professor of Constitutional Law David B. Cruz, USC Gould School of Law
- former United States Attorney for the District of New Jersey Paul J. Fishman
- Marci A. Hamilton, CEO and Academic Director at CHILD USA, and former professor at the University of Pennsylvania Law School, and at the Benjamin N. Cardozo School of Law, Yeshiva University
- Judge Toby J. Heytens, U.S. Court of Appeals for the Fourth Circuit.
- law professor Aviva Orenstein, professor at Indiana University Maurer School of Law
- clinical law professor David M. Shapiro, Northwestern University Pritzker School of Law, former staff attorney for ACLU Prison Project
- law professor Zephyr Teachout, of Fordham University, best known for her work as director of online organizing for the campaign of Howard Dean for the 2004 Democratic Presidential nomination and expert on political corruption
- law professor Rebecca Tushnet, professor at Harvard Law School, formerly of Georgetown University Law Center
- law professor Michael Vandenbergh, professor at Vanderbilt Law School, formerly the Chief of Staff at the Environmental Protection Agency
- Bloomberg business and finance columnist Matt Levine
- law professor Katharine Baker, professor at Chicago-Kent College of Law
- Judge Gregory G. Katsas, U.S. Court of Appeals for the D.C. Circuit.

== See also ==
- List of Jewish American jurists

Legal offices
Preceded by Seat established by 84 Stat. 294	Judge of the United States District Court for the Eastern District of Pennsylvania; 1970–1982	Succeeded by Thomas Newman O'Neill Jr.
Preceded by Max Rosenn	Judge of the United States Court of Appeals for the Third Circuit; 1981–2003	Succeeded by Franklin Van Antwerpen
Preceded by Dolores Sloviter	Chief Judge of the United States Court of Appeals for the Third Circuit; 1998–2003	Succeeded by Anthony Joseph Scirica
