= Kelley B. Hodge =

American judge (born 1971)

Kelley Hodge
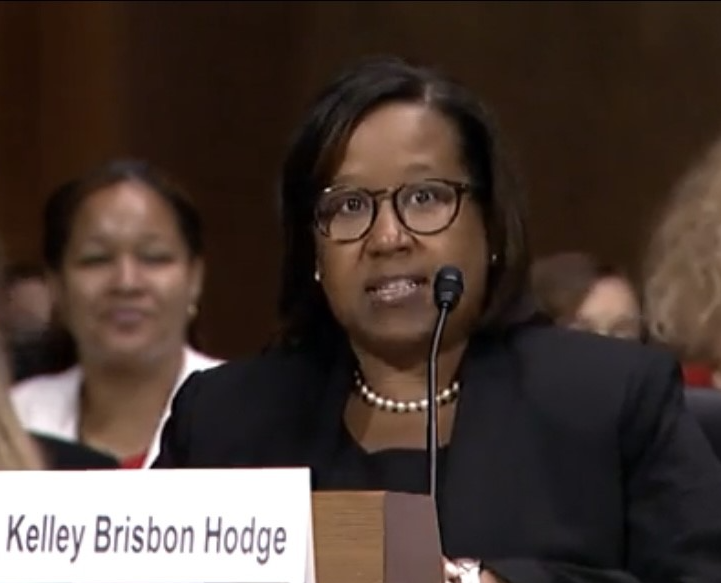

Judge of the United States District Court for the Eastern District of Pennsylvania
- Incumbent
- Assumed office December 23, 2022
- Appointed by: Joe Biden
- Preceded by: Petrese B. Tucker

25th District Attorney of Philadelphia
- Acting
- In office July 24, 2017 – January 1, 2018
- Preceded by: Rufus Seth Williams
- Succeeded by: Larry Krasner

Personal details
- Born: Kelley Lisa Brisbon; 1971 (age 54–55) Abington, Pennsylvania, U.S.
- Party: Democratic
- Education: University of Virginia (BA); University of Richmond (JD)

Kelley Brisbon Hodge (born 1971) is an American attorney and who is a United States district judge of the United States District Court for the Eastern District of Pennsylvania. She served as the 25th District Attorney of Philadelphia. After being elected on July 20, 2017, by the Philadelphia Court of Common Pleas Board of Judges, Hodge was sworn in on July 24, 2017, making her the first African American woman to serve as district attorney in the Commonwealth of Pennsylvania.

== Early life and education ==
Hodge grew up in Montgomery County, Pennsylvania, and attended Mount Saint Joseph Academy. She attended the University of Virginia, where she received her Bachelor of Arts Degree in foreign affairs and in Spanish Language and Literature in 1993. She then went on to earn a Juris Doctor from the University of Richmond T.C. Williams School of Law in 1996.

== Career ==
She became a public defender in Richmond, Virginia, in 1997. She joined the Philadelphia District Attorney's Office in 2004, and afterward worked in the private sector. In 2011, Hodge was appointed to the Pennsylvania Commission on Crime and Delinquency as safe schools advocate in Philadelphia by Governor Tom Corbett, where she served until 2015. From 2015 to 2016, she was the Title IX coordinator and executive assistant to the president at the University of Virginia in Charlottesville.

Hodge served as the interim district attorney from July 24, 2017, assuming the role following Rufus Seth Williams resignation, until January 1, 2018, when Larry Krasner took office.

From 2016 to 2017 and 2018 to 2020, Hodge was of counsel at the law firm of Elliott Greenleaf in Blue Bell, Pennsylvania. In April 2020, Hodge joined Fox Rothschild in the firm's Philadelphia office as a partner in the labor and employment department.

=== Federal judicial service ===
On July 12, 2022, President Joe Biden nominated Hodge to serve as a United States district judge of the United States District Court for the Eastern District of Pennsylvania. President Biden nominated Hodge to the seat vacated by Judge Petrese B. Tucker, who assumed senior status on June 1, 2021. On September 7, 2022, a hearing on her nomination was held before the Senate Judiciary Committee. On September 28, 2022, her nomination was reported out of committee by a 13–9 vote. On December 6, 2022, the United States Senate invoked cloture on her nomination by a 52–43 vote. Later that day, her nomination was confirmed by a 52–44 vote. She received her judicial commission on December 23, 2022.

== See also ==
- List of African-American federal judges
- List of African-American jurists

Legal offices
Preceded by Petrese B. Tucker	Judge of the United States District Court for the Eastern District of Pennsylvania; 2022–present	Incumbent
