= Thomas E. Kauper =

American lawyer and legal scholar (1935–2025)

Thomas E. Kauper (September 25, 1935 – February 9, 2025) was an American lawyer and legal scholar. He was the Henry M. Butzel Professor of Law Emeritus at the University of Michigan Law School. Kauper was best known as a property law and antitrust expert. Kauper served as Assistant Attorney General for the United States Department of Justice Antitrust Division from 1972 to 1976. Kauper's more recent work focuses on European Union antitrust and competition law.

== Life and career ==
Kauper was the son of Professor Paul G. Kauper, who graduated from the University of Michigan Law School in 1932. Kauper earned his A.B. from the University of Michigan in 1957 and his J.D. from the University of Michigan Law School in 1960. At Michigan Law, Kauper was editor-in-chief of the Michigan Law Review and was elected to the Order of the Coif. He was a law clerk for Justice Potter Stewart of the U.S. Supreme Court from 1962 to 1964. He practiced law in Chicago from 1962 to 1964 before joining the University of Michigan Law School faculty in 1964.

Kauper's work is mainly in the fields of property and antitrust law. He was the coauthor of Property: An Introduction to the Concept and the Institution, a leading property casebook. Kauper served for 14 years as a member of the American Bar Association Council of the Antitrust Section, and served for one year as vice-chairman of the Section. Kauper was the John M. Olin Visiting Professor of Business, Economics, and Law at Harvard Law School in winter 2002.

At Michigan Law, Kauper taught property, antitrust, unfair trade practices, trusts and estates, and other courses.

Kauper twice took leaves of absence from Michigan Law faculty to serve in U.S. Department of Justice posts: first as deputy assistant attorney general in the Office of Legal Counsel from 1969 to 1971, where he was deputy to William H. Rehnquist, and then as Assistant Attorney General for the Antitrust Division from 1972 to 1976.

Kauper retired as an active faculty member at Michigan Law and assumed emeritus status on May 31, 2008. He died on February 9, 2025, at the age of 89.

== See also ==
- List of law clerks for the eighth seat of the Supreme Court of the United States
