= Cheryl Ann Krause =

American judge (born 1968)

Cheryl Krause
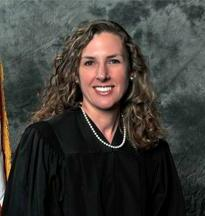

Judge of the United States Court of Appeals for the Third Circuit
- Incumbent
- Assumed office July 9, 2014
- Appointed by: Barack Obama
- Preceded by: Dolores Sloviter

Personal details
- Born: 1968 (age 57–58) St. Louis, Missouri, U.S.
- Education: University of Pennsylvania (BA); Stanford University (JD)

Cheryl Ann Krause (born 1968) is a United States circuit judge of the United States Court of Appeals for the Third Circuit.

== Biography ==
=== Early life and education ===
Krause was born in St. Louis, Missouri, and grew up outside Philadelphia, Pennsylvania. She received her Bachelor of Arts summa cum laude, from the University of Pennsylvania in 1989 and her Juris Doctor with highest honors from Stanford Law School in 1993. After graduating from law school, Krause clerked for Judge Alex Kozinski of the United States Court of Appeals for the Ninth Circuit from 1993 to 1994, and then for Justice Anthony Kennedy of the Supreme Court of the United States from 1994 to 1995.

=== Professional career ===
From 1995 to 1996, Krause worked as a lecturer and visiting scholar at Stanford Law School, as well as a law clerk at Heller Ehrman in San Francisco, California. Krause was an associate at Davis Polk & Wardwell in New York City from 1996 to 1997, and then served as an Assistant United States Attorney in the Southern District of New York from 1997 to 2002. Krause returned to Philadelphia in 2003, where she joined Hangley Aronchick Segal & Pudlin as a shareholder. In 2006, she became a partner at Dechert, where she specialized in white-collar criminal defense and government investigations.

Since 2003, she has regularly taught courses at the University of Pennsylvania Law School, where she founded an appellate litigation externship program. She also founded the Philadelphia Project in 2011, a partnership between Dechert and The Public Interest Law Center of Philadelphia to improve the quality of education for children with disabilities. Since 2007, Krause has served as outside counsel for the City of Philadelphia's Board of Ethics and on the board of directors of the Committee of Seventy, a non-partisan civic organization focused on fair elections and government integrity.

== Federal judicial service ==
On February 6, 2014, President Barack Obama nominated Krause to serve as a United States Circuit Judge of the United States Court of Appeals for the Third Circuit, to the seat vacated by Judge Dolores Sloviter, who assumed senior status on June 21, 2013. She received a hearing before the United States Senate Committee on the Judiciary on March 12, 2014. On April 3, 2014 her nomination was reported out of committee by voice vote. On June 24, 2014, Senate Majority Leader Harry Reid filed for cloture on the nomination. On June 26, 2014, the Senate invoked cloture on her nomination by a 57–39 vote. On July 7, 2014, her nomination was confirmed by a 93–0 vote. She received her judicial commission on July 9, 2014.

== See also ==
- List of law clerks for the first seat of the Supreme Court of the United States

Legal offices
| Preceded by Dolores Sloviter | Judge of the United States Court of Appeals for the Third Circuit; 2014–present | Incumbent |
