= Julie O'Sullivan =

Julie R. O'Sullivan (born 1959) has been a professor at the Georgetown University Law Center since joining the faculty in November 1994 from her position in the Office of Independent Counsel (Little Rock, Arkansas), where she worked on the "Whitewater" investigation. She served as an assistant U.S. attorney in the Criminal Division of the U.S. Attorney's Office of the Southern District of New York. In addition, O'Sullivan was a litigation associate with Davis Polk & Wardwell and served as clerk to Levin H. Campbell of the First Circuit Court of Appeals and to Justice Sandra Day O'Connor of the U.S. Supreme Court. She is a graduate of Stanford University and Cornell Law School.

== See also ==
- List of law clerks for the eighth seat of the Supreme Court of the United States
