= Carl E. Schneider =

American legal scholar (1948–2023)

- Born: 1948
- Died: May 6, 2023 (aged 74–75)
- Education: Harvard University (AB); University of Michigan Law School (JD)
- Scientific career
- Fields: Medical law, Legal ethics
- Workplaces: University of Michigan Law School

Carl E. Schneider was an American lawyer and bioethicist. He served as Chauncey Stillman Professor of Law and as Professor of Internal Medicine at the University of Michigan. He was educated at Harvard College and received his JD from the University of Michigan, where he served as editor-in-chief of the law review. Schneider subsequently clerked for Judge Carl McGowan of the United States Court of Appeals for the District of Columbia Circuit; he served in the same capacity for Justice Potter Stewart of the United States Supreme Court. In 1981, he joined the law faculty at the University of Michigan. In 1998, he was appointed to the medical faculty as well.

Schneider authored several books, including The Censor's Hand: The Misregulation of Human-Subject Research.

== Views on institutional review boards ==
Schneider argued that institutional review boards are unnecessary and harmful, restricting useful and innocuous research while being likely to permit truly dangerous studies. He stated in a 2018 lecture that IRBs are "deeply unethical system[s] of regulation" because they fail to reach consistent decisions and prohibit many experiments which have the potential to benefit patient health. Schneider cited a multi-center study of vitamin A supplementation for neonatal ICU patients which IRBs halted: one institution's IRB rejected the study because it considered the experiment unnecessary, claiming the benefits of vitamin A supplementation were proven; another denied it because it considered the effects of vitamin A on neonates too ill-studied to be ethical. He continued by noting that even without IRB approval, the doctors running the study would have had the ability to give or not give vitamin A to their patients, and even to collect data on the two groups. However, to compare the patients would require IRB approval.

== See also ==
- List of law clerks for the eighth seat of the Supreme Court of the United States
