= Behavioral law and economics =

Application of behavioral economics to legal systems

Behavioral law and economics (BLE) is an interdisciplinary field that applies insights from behavioral economics and cognitive psychology to the analysis and design of legal rules, procedures, and institutions. It challenges the standard law and economics model, which assumes that individuals are rational actors who maximize their expected utility. Instead, BLE draws on empirical evidence showing that individuals systematically deviate from rationality in predictable ways. These deviations—such as framing effects, loss aversion, and overoptimism—have important implications for legal policy, regulation, and judicial decision-making.

Unlike behavioral economics proper, which is a primarily scientific discipline concerned with describing and modeling decision-making behavior, behavioral law and economics is normative and applied. It uses behavioral findings to design legal rules that improve social welfare. In this way, BLE serves as a bridge between descriptive psychology and legal engineering, seeking to align law with actual, rather than idealized, human behavior.

== Emergence and development ==
The intellectual roots of behavioral law and economics lie in the behavioral revolution in economics and psychology, particularly the work of Daniel Kahneman and Amos Tversky. Their empirical work documented systematic violations of expected utility theory and helped establish core concepts such as loss aversion, framing, and heuristics. These insights were further developed and popularized by Richard Thaler, who emphasized their relevance to consumer behavior and economic policy.

Behavioral law and economics emerged as a distinct subfield in the late 1990s. The foundational article by Christine Jolls, Cass Sunstein, and Richard Thaler (1998) laid out a program for replacing the rational actor assumption in legal analysis with empirically validated behavioral models. In 2000, Cass Sunstein edited Behavioral Law and Economics, a widely cited volume that collected early contributions to the field.

Early BLE research focused on torts, contracts, and consumer protection. For example, Korobkin’s work on default rules and status quo bias argued that contractual defaults are not neutral but powerfully shape outcomes. Camerer, Issacharoff, Loewenstein, O'Donoghue, and Rabin applied similar insights to consumer law and proposed new forms of regulation that account for bounded rationality.

The field gained further legitimacy with the publication of comprehensive overviews, including Zamir and Teichman’s Oxford Handbook of Behavioral Economics and the Law (2014). Contributions from Luppi and Parisi extended BLE into areas such as accident law, corporate governance, and judicial procedure.

More recent developments—such as "benevolent biasing" and "cognitive leveraging"—deliberately harness or induce cognitive biases to improve welfare, especially in settings where traditional incentives fail.

== Applications ==
=== Default rules and choice architecture ===
BLE has drawn attention to the behavioral significance of default rules in contracts and regulation. Due to status quo bias and inertia, individuals often stick with default options even when better alternatives are available.

Examples include automatic enrollment in pension plans, organ donation opt-outs, and pro-consumer defaults in online contracts. These interventions exploit passive decision-making to improve welfare while preserving choice.

=== Debiasing strategies ===
One of the core techniques in BLE is the design of legal rules that help individuals overcome or avoid their own cognitive biases. Jolls and Sunstein distinguish between "debiasing through law" (reducing biases directly) and "debiasing law" (structuring legal rules to be robust to biases).

Debiasing strategies include mandatory disclosures, improved warnings, calibrated default rules, and simplification of decision environments. Courts may also attempt to reduce biases in juries through revised jury instructions, exclusion of prejudicial evidence, or bifurcation of punitive damages proceedings.

=== Insulating rules ===
Rather than correcting biases directly, some BLE-informed legal strategies seek to minimize the impact of bias by shifting decision-making authority. For instance, assigning complex corporate decisions to independent directors can insulate firms from managerial overoptimism. Regulation can also act as insulation: mandatory safety standards reduce reliance on consumer judgment, which may be distorted by overconfidence or availability heuristics.

=== Benevolent biasing ===
Whereas cognitive bias is typically treated as a problem, strategies like "benevolent biasing" and "cognitive leveraging" seek to improve social welfare by deliberately inducing or exploiting preexisting cognitive biases when rational behavior leads to socially suboptimal outcomes. Benevolent biasing occurs when rational individuals are made to behave irrationally in circumstances where rational behavior leads to inefficient outcomes. For example, in criminal law, increasing the complexity of deliberating about illegal acts (rather than increasing expected sanctions) may deter crime by exploiting cognitive overload or status quo bias.

In environmental regulation, structuring electricity billing as prepaid—with penalties for overuse—can reduce consumption due to loss aversion, even though the total cost remains unchanged.

=== Cognitive leveraging ===
"Cognitive leveraging" refers to strategies that expose latent biases to influence behavior in beneficial ways. For instance, individuals may underestimate their future energy use due to overoptimism. A billing structure requiring consumers to estimate future consumption can leverage this bias, nudging them toward lower use without altering prices or imposing sanctions.

== Criticism ==
BLE has attracted substantial criticism on empirical, theoretical, and institutional grounds.

Applications of behavioral law and economics to consumer finance, particularly credit card usage, have faced empirical challenges. Analyses of large-scale consumer data have found little support for predicted outcomes such as systematic welfare losses or behavioral anomalies in repayment behavior, raising questions about the real-world applicability of behavioral claims in this domain.

Some scholars argue that behavioral law and economics lacks a unifying model. Unlike rational choice theory, which provides a general framework for prediction and analysis, BLE is said to rely on a loose aggregation of context-specific biases. The incorporation of behavioral principles such as reference dependence and context-sensitive preferences has been interpreted as fundamentally incompatible with the rational actor framework that underpins traditional law and economics. Rather than refining existing models, this approach may displace core analytical assumptions, leading to a redefinition of the normative foundations of legal economic analysis. Critics worry that this "ad hoc" approach allows policymakers to invoke cognitive biases selectively to justify preferred outcomes.

Others question the external validity of behavioral findings, many of which are derived from laboratory experiments. Plott and Zeiler have argued that prominent effects such as the endowment effect may disappear under improved experimental controls, suggesting that some biases are artifacts of flawed methodology.

Yet other critics highlight the institutional limits of courts and legislatures in identifying and correcting biases. For instance, Pi argues that substantive legal adjustments based on behavioral models are only effective under narrow conditions—for example, when cognitive biases are systematic and one-sided, and when legal standards are quantitatively specified. In most real-world contexts, Pi contends, the law should maintain a "presumption of rationality," as attempts to tailor legal rules to biases will generally backfire or cancel out across parties.

Others raise concerns about paternalism and democratic legitimacy. Critics argue that behavioral interventions—especially nudges—may obscure normative judgments about whose welfare counts and whether preferences should be respected.

Finally, some note that policymakers and judges are themselves prone to bias. Without safeguards, BLE may justify interventions based on incomplete evidence or reflect institutional biases of the state.

== See also ==
- Behavioral economics
- Law and economics
- Nudge theory
- Cognitive bias
- Bounded rationality
- Libertarian paternalism
