= Midnight regulations =

US federal regulations by executive branch agencies in period of an outgoing president

Midnight regulations are United States federal government regulations created by executive branch agencies during the transition period of an outgoing president's administration.

== Process of creating new regulations ==
The United States Congress passes laws that sometimes outline only broad policy mandates. Rulemaking by the specialist agencies in the executive branch adds necessary detail to these laws. Rulemaking also provides an administration with an opportunity to exert political influence over government without having to go through Congress to change the law.

U.S. federal law mandates a 60-day waiting period before any major regulatory changes become law. Thus, some presidents try to publish new major regulations on November 21, 60 days before the new president's inauguration on January 20. "Minor" regulations, or those that have less than US$100 million in effect on the economy or do not have major social policy significance, have a similar 30-day waiting period. Tom Firey, of the Cato Institute's Regulation magazine, argues that most midnight regulations are in fact primarily political symbolism rather than major regulatory change. Regulations that have not yet become law can be placed on hold by the incoming President.

Regulations that take effect before a new president takes office can still be reversed by the same executive agencies, but this requires a considerable rule-making process. In addition, reversing recently enacted regulations may distract an incoming administration from its own regulatory agenda. Alternatively, because regulations are executive branch agencies' interpretations of statutes passed by Congress, Congress can effectively overturn the regulations by passing more explicit statutory mandates. But in each case the period in which the disfavored regulations are law may permit undesired results to take place. For example, a heavily polluting power plant could be built in the period that a federal regulation is law. A third option is for Congress to overturn the regulation under the Congressional Review Act of 1996, requiring congressional approval for any similar rule issued in the future. Of the 50,000 regulations enacted since the Act was passed, as of 2008, only fifteen had been so overturned.

== History ==
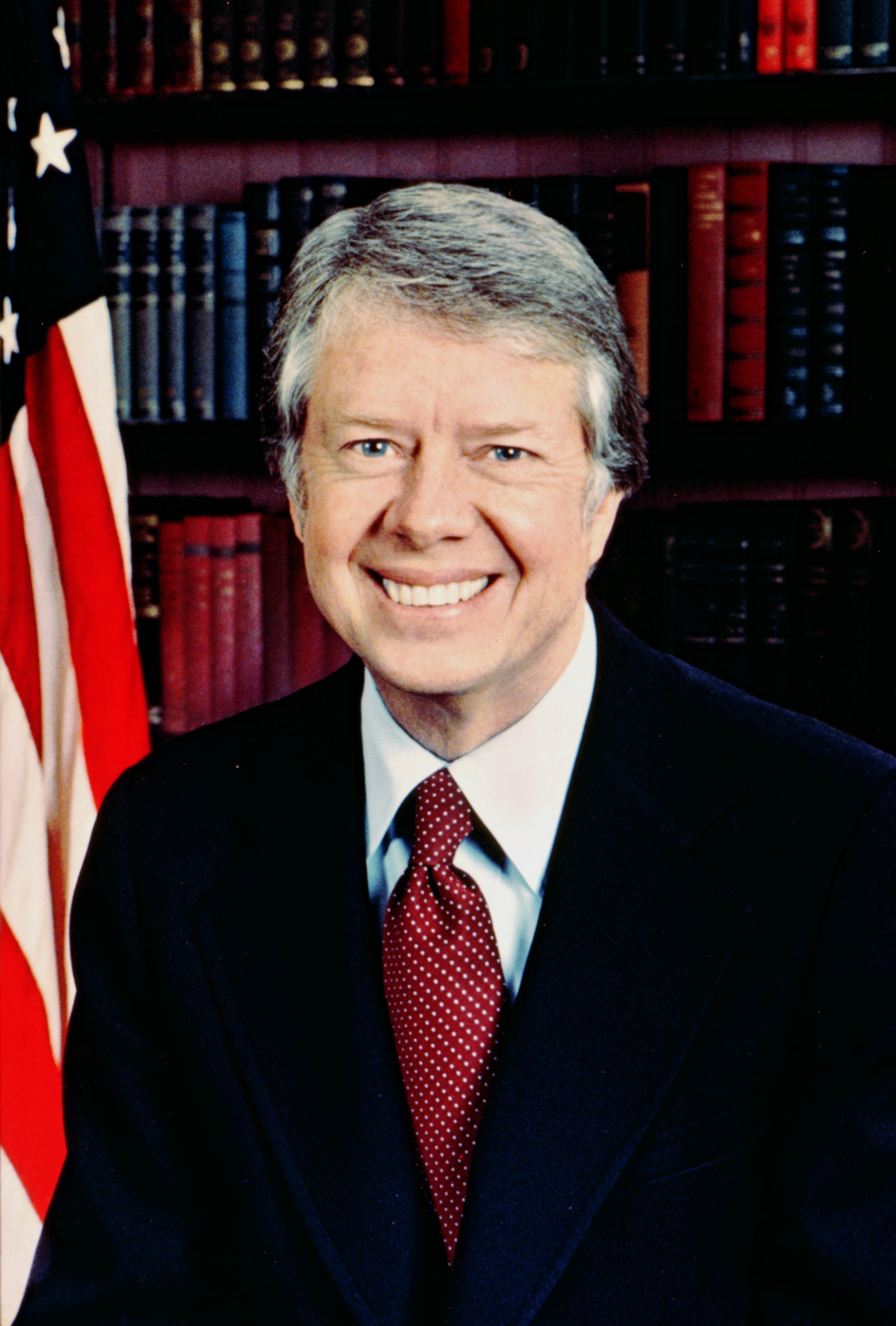
Jimmy Carter was the first president to make extensive use of midnight regulations.

The term "midnight regulation" entered the lexicon in 1980–81, during the final months of Jimmy Carter's single term as president. Carter's administration set a new record for midnight regulations by publishing more than 10,000 pages of new rules between Election Day and Ronald Reagan's Inauguration Day. The term is an allusion to the "midnight judges" appointed by John Adams in the final months of his presidency.

Due to midnight regulations, since 1948, during the period between a presidential election and the inauguration of a president of a different party, the Federal Register has averaged 17 percent more pages than during the same period in non-election years.

=== Bill Clinton ===
The Clinton administration enacted a flurry of rules limiting logging and lead paint, raising appliance energy efficiency, and tightening privacy of medical records. One of Clinton's midnight regulations imposed a more stringent drinking water standard for arsenic after years of EPA study. Although Bush suspended the new regulation upon taking office, EPA head Christine Todd Whitman eventually approved it. When President George W. Bush took office in 2001, his administration acted to block the implementation of 90 final rules that were issued in the final months of the Clinton administration but that had not yet gone into effect.

=== George W. Bush ===
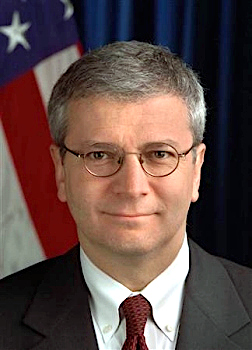
Bush Chief of Staff Joshua Bolten wrote a memo encouraging Administration agencies to pass rules in time for them to become law before the end of Bush's second term.

The Bush administration also approved thousands of pages of dozens of new agency rules, setting a new record. Many of these regulations were promulgated in the hope of ensuring enactment before Barack Obama took office and could prevent the rules from becoming law. Bush Chief of Staff Joshua Bolten encouraged timely passage of the rules in a May 2008 memo to agencies suggesting that final versions be submitted by November 1. Finalized and proposed rules included:

- A finalized rule that effectively deregulates industrial farms
- An adopted rule that opens up public land to drilling preliminary to the development of oil shale extraction
- A proposed rule that provides for a conscience clause for workers at hospitals receiving federal money (particularly state hospitals), allowing them to refuse to perform abortions or dispense contraceptives

Several other rules were already adopted in late 2008, including one increasing truck drivers' maximum hours of service to eleven and another restricting employee time off under the Family and Medical Leave Act. The rules attracted considerable criticism.

Hours after Obama took office, his administration ordered all executive branch agencies to halt enactment of any rules proposed during the Bush administration until the incoming administration could review them. According to the environmentalist magazine Grist, these efforts were effective in only a few cases; for other environmental rules the Obama administration tried to reverse some rules through Congress and some through the same slow administrative rulemaking process while interest groups challenged other environmental regulations in the courts.

A subcommittee on administrative law in the Democratic House of Representatives held a hearing on midnight regulations the month after Obama's inauguration.

=== Barack Obama ===
The Obama administration recognized the potential for midnight regulations as early as the end of 2015. Howard Shelanski, the Administrator for the Office of Information and Regulatory Affairs (OIRA), issued a memo to federal agencies directing them to: “To the extent feasible and consistent with your priorities, statutory obligations, and judicial deadlines, however, agencies should strive to complete their highest priority rulemakings by the summer of 2016 to avoid an end-of-year scramble that has the potential to lower the quality of regulations that OIRA receives for review and to tax the resources available for interagency review.” In the Obama administration's final Unified Agenda, there were 25 notable rules in the “midnight period” with combined regulatory cost estimates (from the “proposed rule” versions) of approximately $44.1 billion.

Starting in November 2016 (the first month of the Obama “midnight period”), OIRA concluded review of 57 rule-makings – a 26 percent increase over the monthly pace from the rest of 2016. Fourteen of these measures were “economically significant” rule-makings. That represents the second-highest total in any November “midnight period” since at least 1996. Notable rulemakings from November 2016 include:

- Conservation Standards for Ceiling Fans
- Revision of Nutrition Facts for Meat and Poultry
- Passenger Equipment Safety Standards
- Renewable Fuel Standards for 2017

House Republicans introduced legislation that would provide a check upon Obama administration midnight rules. Representative Darrell Issa introduced H.R. 5982, or the “Midnight Rules Relief Act of 2016”, that “amends the Congressional Review Act to allow Congress to consider a joint resolution to disapprove multiple regulations that federal agencies have submitted for congressional review within the last 60 legislative days of a session of Congress during the final year of a President's term.” The bill passed in the House of Representatives by a vote of 240–179.

Senator Ron Johnson has written letters to Shelanski and multiple other agencies asking them to put a hold on regulatory activity during this “midnight period”.
