= Lame duck =

Elected official who is about to leave office

In politics, a lame duck or outgoing politician is an elected official whose successor has already been elected or will be soon. Outgoing politicians are often seen as having less influence with other politicians due to their limited time left in office. Conversely, a lame duck is free to make decisions that exercise the standard powers with little fear of backlash, such as issuing executive orders, pardons, or other controversial edicts. Lame duck politicians result from term limits, planned retirement, or electoral losses, and are especially noticeable where political systems build in a delay between the announcement of results and the taking of office by election winners. Even at the local level, politicians who do not seek re-election can lose credibility and influence. Uncompleted projects may fall to the wayside as their influence diminishes.

The term is also used for presidents who do not have a majority in parliament and therefore find it difficult to implement their political goals.

== Description ==
The status can be due to:

- having lost a re-election bid
- choosing not to seek another term, which would start at the expiration of the current term
- a term limit which prevents the official from running for that particular office again
- the abolition of the office, which must nonetheless be served out until the end of the official's term.
- significant losses by the official's political party in a legislative body, resulting in greater checks on the official's authority.

Since these politicians do not face the consequences of their actions in an upcoming election, they have greater freedom to issue unpopular decisions or appointments. Examples include last-minute midnight regulations issued by executive agencies of outgoing US presidential administrations and executive orders issued by outgoing presidents. Such actions date back to the Judiciary Act of 1801 ("Midnight Judges Act"), in which Federalist President John Adams and the outgoing 6th Congress amended the Judiciary Act to create more federal judge seats for Adams to appoint and the Senate to confirm before the Democratic-Republican Thomas Jefferson was inaugurated and the Democratic-Republican majority 7th Congress convened. Into the 21st century US President Bill Clinton was widely criticized for issuing 140 pardons and other acts of executive clemency on his last day in office, including two former close colleagues, donors, fellow Democratic members, and his own half-brother.

In many countries, toward the facilitation of a smooth transition, an outgoing president accepts advice from and consults with the president-elect.

== Origins of the term ==
The first time the phrase is known to have been used in its metaphorical sense was in the 18th century; it was used at the London Stock Exchange to refer to a stockbroker who defaulted on his debts. In 1761, Horace Walpole wrote, in a letter to Sir Horace Mann: "Do you know what a Bull and a Bear and Lame Duck are?" In 1791, Mary Berry wrote that the Duchess of Devonshire's loss of £50,000 (equivalent to £7,000,000 in 2024) in stocks was "the conversation of the town", and that her name was to be "posted up as a lame duck". The first known use of the term to refer to politicians is in the January 14, 1863, issue of the Congressional Globe (which was at the time the official record of the proceedings of the United States Congress): "In no event ... could [the Court of Claims] be justly obnoxious to the charge of being a receptacle of 'lame ducks' or broken down politicians."

== Examples ==
=== Australia ===
In Australia, regardless of when the election is held, senators sit from July 1 following their election to June 30 six years later, (Note: Senators from the Northern Territory and the Australian Capital Territory sit from July 1 following their election to June 30 three years later.) while the newly elected members of the House of Representatives (lower house) take their seats soon after an election. A Senate that is destined to lose its majority as a result of such a change is called a lame-duck Senate and often attracts criticism if it blocks government measures introduced in the House of Representatives.

For example, after the 2004 election, it became clear that the governing Liberal Party/National Party coalition would gain a majority in the new Senate, which was due to sit the following July. In May, some months after the elections but before the new Senate came to power, the old Senate refused to pass new tax laws that had been passed by the House, which served to merely delay the passage of those laws until the new Senate assembled. In the 2010 Australian federal election, Senator Steve Fielding of the minor party Family First lost his seat and subsequently threatened to block supply if the Labor Party was successful in forming a minority government.

Following their landslide loss in the 2025 Australian federal election, the Liberal Party elected moderate faction member Sussan Ley as their new leader in the automatic leadership vote as Peter Dutton had lost his seat in Parliament. Her victory was made possible by several lame duck Senators and an unusual situation of allowing a vote from a lame duck failed House of Representatives candidate. Ley won the vote 29 to 25 with votes including departing senators Linda Reynolds and Hollie Hughes as well as Gisele Kapterian, who was assumed by party whips to have won the Division of Bradfield and was allowed to vote, but after a long count had in fact lost by 40 votes. With those lost votes and the addition of right faction members of new Senator Jess Collins and Terry Young who had not voted because he had stayed home during the very close election count in Longman, it would leave Ley 1 vote behind when the Senator change took place at the start of July, two months after the leadership election.

=== Brazil ===
In the 2022 presidential election, Luiz Inácio Lula da Silva defeated incumbent right-wing president Jair Bolsonaro with 50,9% of the votes. In the months of November and December, Bolsonaro was referred to as a "lame duck", while a plot to overthrow the president-elect by his supporters was being constructed, then executed. In 2025, Bolsonaro was sentenced for this crime.

=== Canada ===
Unlike in some countries, there is no "lame duck" session of Parliament in Canada between the general election and swearing in of the new Parliament. In almost all cases, the outgoing prime minister or premier hands over power directly to their designated successor after a few weeks at most after a general election or shortly after a leadership election. Usually, when the leader of a ruling party steps down, they also relinquish their caucus leadership role at around the same time, so there is no need for an interim caucus leader. The power of outgoing Canadian parliamentarians is limited. Instead the departing prime minister or premier and cabinet ministers that were members of the now dissolved parliament will serve in an "acting" or "caretaker" capacity (i.e., not being able to make important appointments nor policy declarations) until the new parliament convenes; in one example when Sir Charles Tupper attempted to make appointments after losing the 1896 Canadian election the Governor General refused to act on this.

A notable exception to the above is the transition between William Lyon Mackenzie King and Louis St. Laurent, making it perhaps the only lame duck example in Canadian federal politics. After resigning the leadership of the Liberals, King became parliamentary leader and continued as Prime Minister of Canada for some months following the leadership election of his successor, St. Laurent, who became party leader but continued as a member of King's cabinet during this time.

While Pierre Trudeau retired from politics in 1984, he directly handed power over to John Turner after the leadership contest. However, Trudeau recommended that Governor General Jeanne Sauvé appoint over 200 Liberals to well-paying patronage positions, including Senators, judges, and executives on various governmental and crown corporation boards, widely seen as a way to offer "plum jobs" to loyal party members. These appointments generated a severe backlash across the spectrum. Turner had the right to recommend that the appointments be cancelled: advice that Sauvé would have been required to follow by constitutional convention. However, he let them stand and made a further 70 appointments himself. Turner refused to produce a written agreement he had made with Trudeau before taking office, documenting a secret deal that saw Trudeau step down early. This is seen by many as Trudeau attempting to exercise some lame duck influence before resigning as prime minister.

=== Italy ===
In Italy, during the President's last six months in office, termed "semestre bianco" ("white semester"), the president cannot dissolve the Parliament and call a new election unless the Parliament's normal term expires during that period. In 2013, the general election was held on February 24-25, three months before president Giorgio Napolitano's term was due to end, resulting in the left-wing bloc having a majority in the Chamber of Deputies but a hung Senate. As by April, a new government had still not been formed, Napolitano would not have been eligible to call a new election if needed to resolve the deadlock.

Meanwhile, a direct translation of "lame duck" - anatra zoppa - is instead used to refer to a situation that can happen in municipal elections. In cities with more than 15,000 inhabitants, mayoral elections are held in two rounds; if no candidate receives a majority of the votes in the first round, then the two best-performing candidates will proceed to a runoff held two weeks later. The lists that supported the mayoral candidate will receive, depending on their result, at least 60% of the council seats due to the majority bonus system. However, the city council is elected separately from the mayor, thus an anatra zoppa situation arises if the lists that supported a different candidate for mayor than the elected one received a majority of votes. It can also arise if a mayor is elected in the first round, but the lists supporting them do not receive at least 40% of the votes, in which case the majority bonus is not activated.

Usually, anatra zoppa administrations tend to be short-lived, with the mayor usually resigning after a year or two, an exception being in the municipality of Noci, where in 2013, center-left candidate Domenico Nisi won the run-off with 57.11% of the vote, whilst in the first round, the lists supporting center-right candidate Stanislao Morea received 53% of the vote to 40.45% of pro-Nisi lists, thus the right-wing lists received 9 out of 16 council seats and the left-wing lists 6. However, Nisi served out his entire term and was re-elected in 2018, this time also with a majority on the council.

For example, during the 2012 local elections, in Isernia, in the first round, center-right candidate Rosa Iorio received a plurality of 45.79%, followed by center-left candidate Ugo De Vivo receiving 30.44% of the vote, so they both proceeded to runoff, where De Vivo defeated Iorio with 57.37% of the vote. However, in the first round, the lists supporting De Vivo had only received a total of 23.59% of the vote, whilst the lists supporting Iorio received 58.66% of the vote. Therefore, the right-wing lists received 21 of the 32 council seats, whilst the left-wing lists only received 8, thus De Vivo, whilst elected mayor, was deprived of a majority in the council. After the center-right councillors resigned en masse, De Vivo resigned and new elections were held.

=== Philippines ===
Under the 1987 Constitution, where the president is limited to one term in office, the last year of the six-year term is considered the lame-duck period.

=== South Korea ===
After his party failed to win a majority in the 2024 legislative election, President Yoon Suk Yeol was described as a lame duck as he faced an opposition-controlled majority for the rest of his tenure; presidents in South Korea are limited to a single five-year term. In December 2024, Yoon declared martial law, which subsequently led to his removal from office.

=== United Kingdom ===
Unlike countries such as the United States that have a transition period between elections and the taking of office of the elected executive, there is an incredibly short transition period (on the order of shorter than a day) between when the identity of the prime minister-designate is known, and their taking office.

Following general elections where a party wins a clear majority in the House of Commons, the identity of the new prime minister is immediately apparent and they are usually appointed the following morning, minutes after their predecessor resigns the office, at back-to-back meetings with the monarch. In the case of a hung parliament where the election is followed by negotiations to form a coalition, or an attempt by the leader of the largest party to lead a minority government, a new prime minister might not be appointed for a few days. In the 2010 election for example, which was held on May 6, Gordon Brown's Labour Party lost its majority in the Commons, but Brown remained caretaker prime minister until May 11, resigning when it became clear that the Conservative Party (which held a plurality) had reached a coalition agreement with the Liberal Democrats, whereupon the Conservative leader David Cameron was appointed prime minister.

Members of parliament cease to be such when parliament is dissolved for a general election, and cannot describe themselves as "John Smith MP" during the election campaign. Government ministers however, as part of the executive, continue to hold office unless and until new ministers are appointed after the election. An example of an extended transition period in the informal sense was the last two years of the premiership of Tony Blair, who before the 2005 United Kingdom general election, announced he would not stand for another election if Labour were to win the 2005 election. The fact that Blair's Labour Party was returned with a substantially reduced majority and that Gordon Brown (who was correctly believed to be Blair's successor) had played a leading part in the election campaign, aroused considerable speculation about Blair's future as party leader and prime minister.

=== United States ===
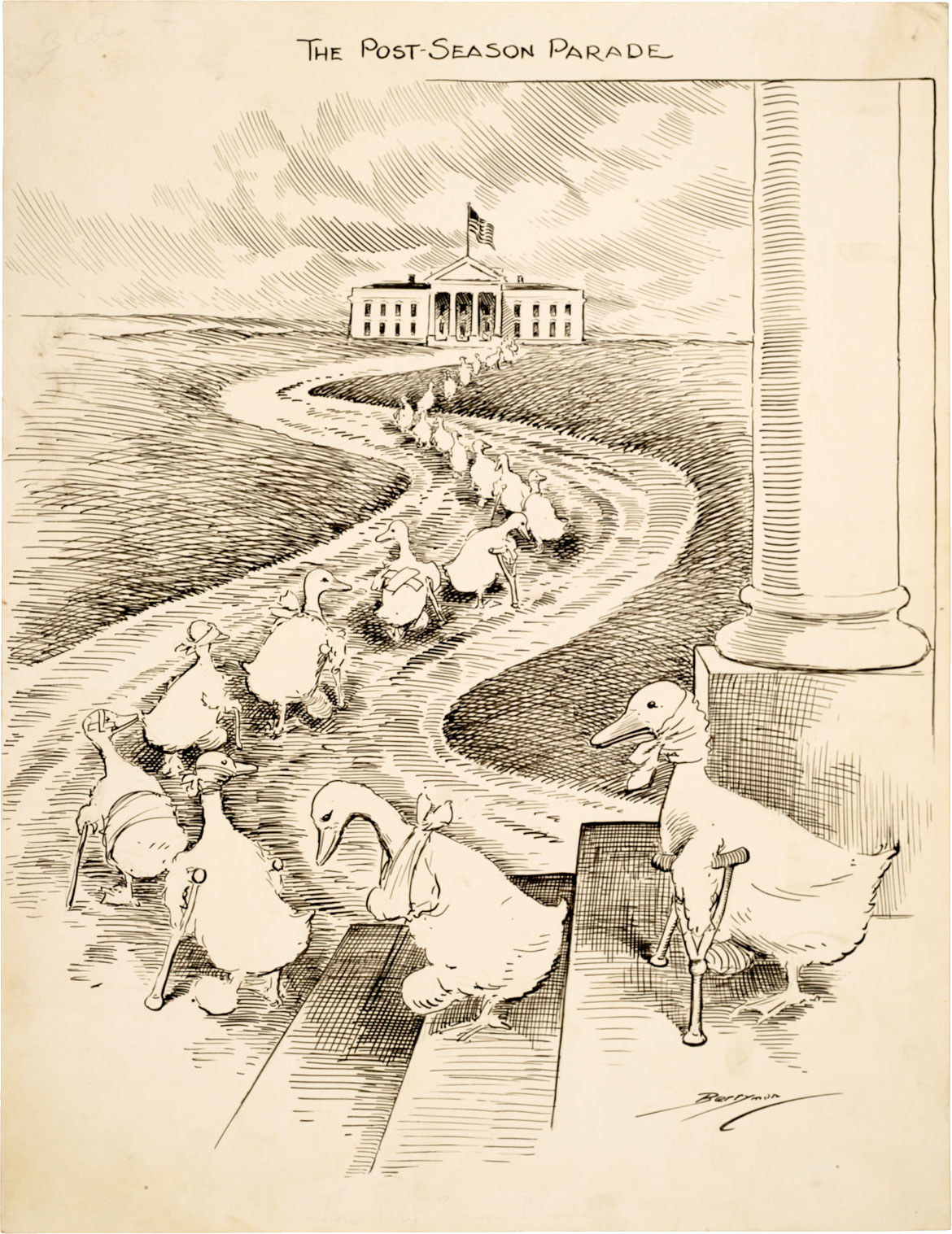
The lame ducks depicted in this Clifford K. Berryman cartoon are defeated Democrats heading to the White House hoping to secure political appointments from then President Woodrow Wilson.

In U.S. politics, the period between (presidential and congressional) elections in November and the inauguration of officials early in the following year is commonly called the "lame-duck period". A president is a lame duck after a successor has been elected, during which time the outgoing president and president-elect usually embark on a transition of power.

Until 1933, inaugurations occurred on March 4. Congress usually had two sessions, the second of which was usually held from the December after the election of the next Congress until March. This session was commonly called the "lame-duck session". Criticism of this process led to the passage of the Twentieth Amendment in 1933, which moved the beginning of the new Congress to January 3 and the inauguration of the president to January 20, thus shortening the lame duck period.

A president elected to a second term is sometimes seen as a lame duck from early in the second term, since term limits prevent them from contesting re-election four years later. However, not personally having to face the electorate again makes a second-term president more powerful than they were in their first term as they are thus freer to take politically unpopular actions. However, this comes with caveats; as the de facto leader of their political party, the president's actions affect how the party performs in the midterm elections two years into the second term, and, to some extent, the success of that party's nominee in the next presidential election four years in the future. For these reasons, it can be argued that a president in their second term is not a lame duck at all.

In his farewell speech from the office of president in January 2017, Barack Obama quipped, "You can tell that I'm a lame duck because nobody's following instructions" when the cheering and applause from the crowd prevented him from commencing his speech. Joe Biden, who ultimately chose not to seek re-election in favour of his vice president Kamala Harris, was also referred to as a lame duck president after his announcement not to run for president a second time. Republican Donald Trump, during his second term, was widely referred to as a lame-duck president by numerous media outlets following the 2026 midterm elections, where the Democrats swept the House and Senate.

=== Vatican City ===
On February 11, 2013, when Pope Benedict XVI announced that he was resigning within 17 days, he was called a "lame duck pope" by some media outlets. Also, due to Pope John Paul II's long and debilitating illness, some journalists (such as Time's Jeff Israely) described the final years of his reign as a lame duck papacy.

=== Venezuela ===
The discontent with the ruling United Socialist Party of Venezuela saw the opposition being elected to hold the majority in the National Assembly of Venezuela for the first time since 1999 following the 2015 parliamentary election. As a result of that election, the lame-duck National Assembly consisting of United Socialist officials filled the Supreme Tribunal (supreme court) with allies. Into early 2016, the Supreme Tribunal alleged that voting irregularities occurred in the parliamentary elections and stripped four Assembly members of their seats, preventing an opposition supermajority in the National Assembly which would be able to challenge President Maduro. The Assembly nevertheless swore in the members in question, in response to which the Supreme Court ruled that the Assembly was in contempt of court and in violation of the constitutional order. The Supreme Tribunal then began to approve multiple actions performed by Maduro and granted him more powers and later stripped the National Assembly of legislative powers, and took those powers for itself; which meant that the Supreme Tribunal might have been able to create laws, causing the 2017 constitutional crisis.

== Other ==
=== Sports ===
In sports usage, a coach or general manager in the final year of their contract without a forthcoming contract extension is often described as a lame duck. Additionally, if a team is on track to miss the playoffs, a coach or general manager can be regarded as a lame duck even if they are under a multiyear contract if they are expected to be fired shortly before or once the season ends. Often taking the blame as the team is out of contention for the postseason, the coach or/and general manager is seen as a poor fit or otherwise does not relate well with others – players and other coaches, the media, their superiors and so forth – and a change in leadership is apparently forthcoming or desired. Often, there will be rumors of a coach and/or manager departure – often by dismissal or forced resignation (also known as "by mutual consent") – with said rumors often beginning several games before the end of the season. Dismissal of the coach and/or manager once the team is eliminated from reaching the postseason, rather than waiting for the conclusion of the season, does cut short their "lame duck" status and clears the way for new hires. In that case, an interim coach and/or interim manager will be appointed to see out the remainder of the season, though their predecessors may still remain on the club payroll as a "special advisor" until their contract expires.

=== Business ===
Especially in the United Kingdom, a "lame duck company" is one that is in such financial difficulty that it is not worth investing in, or is unworthy of government support.

=== Software engineering ===
In networked server systems, the term "lame duck mode" is used to describe a networked server in the process of shutting down (e.g., for a software update or relocating to a different physical machine). During lame duck mode, which can last from a few seconds to a few minutes, the server will finish serving existing clients and requests, and for some time will continue accepting new requests, while notifying clients not to contact them again for some time. If the server continues receiving new requests after this grace period, it might stop serving them and shut down anyway, depending on a desired outcome and configuration. Proper cooperation of client applications reduces service disruption and retry latency in distributed systems. There are many other possible variations of "lame duck mode", like serving existing connections, but not accepting any new connections. As such, lame duck mode is a method of load balancing.

== See also ==
- Caretaker government
- Provisional government
- Roi fainéant
