= Boris Bershteyn =

American lawyer, law clerk and Obama administration official

Acting Administrator of the Office of Information and Regulatory Affairs
- In office August 21, 2012 – June 27, 2013
- President: Barack Obama
- Preceded by: Cass Sunstein
- Succeeded by: Howard Shelanski

Personal details
- Born: 1977 (age 48–49) Kyiv, Ukraine SSR, Soviet Union
- Party: Democratic
- Spouse: Sofia Yakren (m. 2007)
- Education: Stanford University (BA); Yale University (JD)

Boris Bershteyn (born 1977) is an Obama administration official who until June 2013 had served as acting administrator of the Office of Information and Regulatory Affairs. He previously served from 2011 to 2012 as general counsel for the federal Office of Management and Budget. Prior to his work at the Office of Management and Budget, he served as an Associate White House Counsel.

== Early life and education ==
Born in Kyiv and raised in the former Soviet Union, Bershteyn attended Lynbrook High School and earned a bachelor's degree from Stanford University in 1999. He then earned a Juris Doctor degree from Yale Law School in 2004.

Bershteyn served as a law clerk for United States Court of Appeals for the Second Circuit Judge José A. Cabranes from 2004 until 2005. Bershteyn then served as a law clerk to Associate Justice David Souter of the U.S. Supreme Court from 2006 until 2007.

== Professional career ==
Early in his career, Bershteyn worked as a lawyer for the law firms Skadden, Arps, Slate, Meagher & Flom and Wachtell, Lipton, Rosen & Katz. From April 2009 until November 2010, Bershteyn served as the deputy general counsel for the Office of Management and Budget. From November 2010 until June 2011, he served as an Associate White House Counsel. On June 21, 2011, he was named general counsel of OMB. He left that position in 2012 to become acting Administrator of the Office of Information and Regulatory Affairs. He held that post until June 2013, when the U.S. Senate confirmed Howard Shelanski to serve as OIRA's Administrator. Bershteyn is currently a partner with Skadden.

== Personal life ==
Bershteyn married Sofia Yakren, also an attorney, in 2007.

Bershteyn is Jewish.

== See also ==
- List of law clerks for the third seat of the Supreme Court of the United States

Political offices
Preceded by Cass Sunstein	Administrator of the Office of Information and Regulatory Affairs; Acting; 2012–2013	Succeeded by Howard Shelanski
