= Paul J. Ray =

American attorney and government official

Paul Ray

Administrator of the Office of Information and Regulatory Affairs
- In office January 10, 2020 – January 20, 2021
- President: Donald Trump
- Preceded by: Neomi Rao
- Succeeded by: Richard Revesz

Personal details
- Education: Hillsdale College (BA); Harvard University (JD)

Paul J. Ray is an American attorney and government official who served as the administrator of the Office of Information and Regulatory Affairs (OIRA) from 2020 to 2021.

== Early life and education ==
Ray is a native of Chattanooga, Tennessee. Paul J. Ray is the son of the late Joe Ray, a teacher, and his wife DeLora. He has a brother and a sister. Following their father's premature death his mother brought the children up as a single mother. Ray earned a Bachelor of Arts in English from Hillsdale College and Juris Doctor from Harvard Law School.

== Career ==
After graduating from law school, Ray clerked for Samuel Alito on the Supreme Court of the United States. He then worked as an attorney at Sidley Austin in Washington, D.C., specializing in federal agency proceedings. After Neomi Rao, the previous administrator of the Office of Information and Regulatory Affairs, was nominated to the United States Court of Appeals for the District of Columbia Circuit, Ray was selected to serve as acting administrator in December 2019. Donald Trump later nominated Ray to serve as administrator. On December 17, 2019, the Senate Homeland Security and Governmental Affairs Committee advanced Ray's nomination by an 8–4 vote. On January 9, 2020, the United States Senate confirmed Paul Ray as the head of the Office of Information and Regulatory Affairs by a 50–44 vote. Ray took up office having served only just under a year at OIRA, which regulatory experts found reflected in his very limited background on dealing with regulatory issues; and whilst noting his young age and showing little similarity with some of the previous postholders, experts warned against underestimating him.

Before his time at the Office of Management and Budget, Ray was Counselor to the Secretary of Labor, responsible for the supervision of regulatory reform efforts.

Ray left the OIRA office on January 20, 2021. In February 2021, it was announced that he would partner with the Texas Public Policy Foundation. Ray was appointed senior adviser at Patomak Global Partners, a financial services consulting firm.

== See also ==
- List of law clerks for the eighth seat of the Supreme Court of the United States
