= Peter W. Huber =

American writer, lawyer, and engineer (1952–2021)

- Born: November 3, 1952; Toronto, Canada
- Died: January 9, 2021 (aged 68); Hanover, New Hampshire, U.S.
- Spouse: Andrea Huber

Academic background
- Education: Massachusetts Institute of Technology (BS, MS, PhD); Harvard University (JD)
- Thesis: Electric charging in liquid hydrocarbon filtration (1976)
- Doctoral advisor: Ain A. Sonin
- Other advisors: James R. Melcher, Ronald F. Probstein

Peter William Huber (November 3, 1952 – January 8, 2021) was a Canadian-American lawyer and author. He was a senior fellow at the Manhattan Institute and was a founding partner at the law firm of Kellogg, Huber, Hansen, Todd, Evans & Figel. He is credited with popularizing the term "junk science" in 1991, and articulating a conservative approach to environmentalism in his 2000 book, Hard Green: Saving the Environment from the Environmentalists.

== Life and career ==
Huber was born on November 3, 1952, in Toronto, Canada, and grew up in Geneva, Switzerland. He entered the Massachusetts Institute of Technology (MIT) at age 17. He received a Ph.D. in mechanical engineering in 1976 at the age of 23 and joined the MIT faculty as a professor, receiving tenure two years later.

While a professor at MIT, Huber began attending Harvard Law School. He was an editor of the Harvard Law Review and graduated in 1982 with a Juris Doctor, summa cum laude. Huber was the only Harvard Law graduate between 1975 and 1996 who received the summa cum laude distinction.

Huber then clerked first for judge (later Supreme Court justice) Ruth Bader Ginsburg of the U.S. Court of Appeals for the D.C. Circuit from 1982 to 1983, and then for Justice Sandra Day O'Connor of the U.S. Supreme Court from 1983 to 1984.

Huber died of frontotemporal dementia on January 8, 2021, in Hanover, New Hampshire, at the age of 68. He had been diagnosed with the progressive neurodegenerative disease in 2017.

== Books ==
- Liability:The Legal Revolution & Its Consequences. Basic Books. 1988.
- The Liability Maze: The Impact of Liability Law on Safety and Innovation. Brookings Institution Press. 1991. ISBN 978-0-8157-3761-2.
- Huber, Peter (1993). Galileo's Revenge: Junk Science In The Courtroom. Basic Books. ISBN 978-0-465-02624-1.
- Huber, Peter (1994). Orwell's Revenge: The 1984 Palimpsest. Free Press. ISBN 978-0-02-915335-2.
- Law and Disorder in Cyberspace: Abolish the FCC and Let Common Law Rule the Telecosm. Oxford University Press. 1997. ISBN 978-0-19-511614-4.
- Judging Science: Scientific Knowledge and the Federal Courts. MIT Press. 1999. ISBN 978-0-262-56120-4. (with Kenneth R. Foster)
- Phantom Risk: Scientific Inference and the Law. MIT Press. 1999. ISBN 978-0-262-56119-8.
- Hard Green: Saving the Environment from the Environmentalists. Basic Books. 2000. ISBN 978-0-465-03113-9.
- Federal Telecommunications Law. Aspen Law. 2004. ISBN 978-0-7355-4261-7.
- The Bottomless Well: The Twilight of Fuel, The Virtue of Waste, and Why We Will Never Run Out of Energy. Basic Books. 2005. ISBN 978-0-465-03117-7. (with Mark P. Mills)
- The Cure in the Code: How 20th Century Law Is Undermining 21st Century Medicine. Basic Books. 2013. ISBN 978-0-465-05068-0.

== See also ==
- List of law clerks for the eighth seat of the Supreme Court of the United States
