= David Frederick =

American lawyer

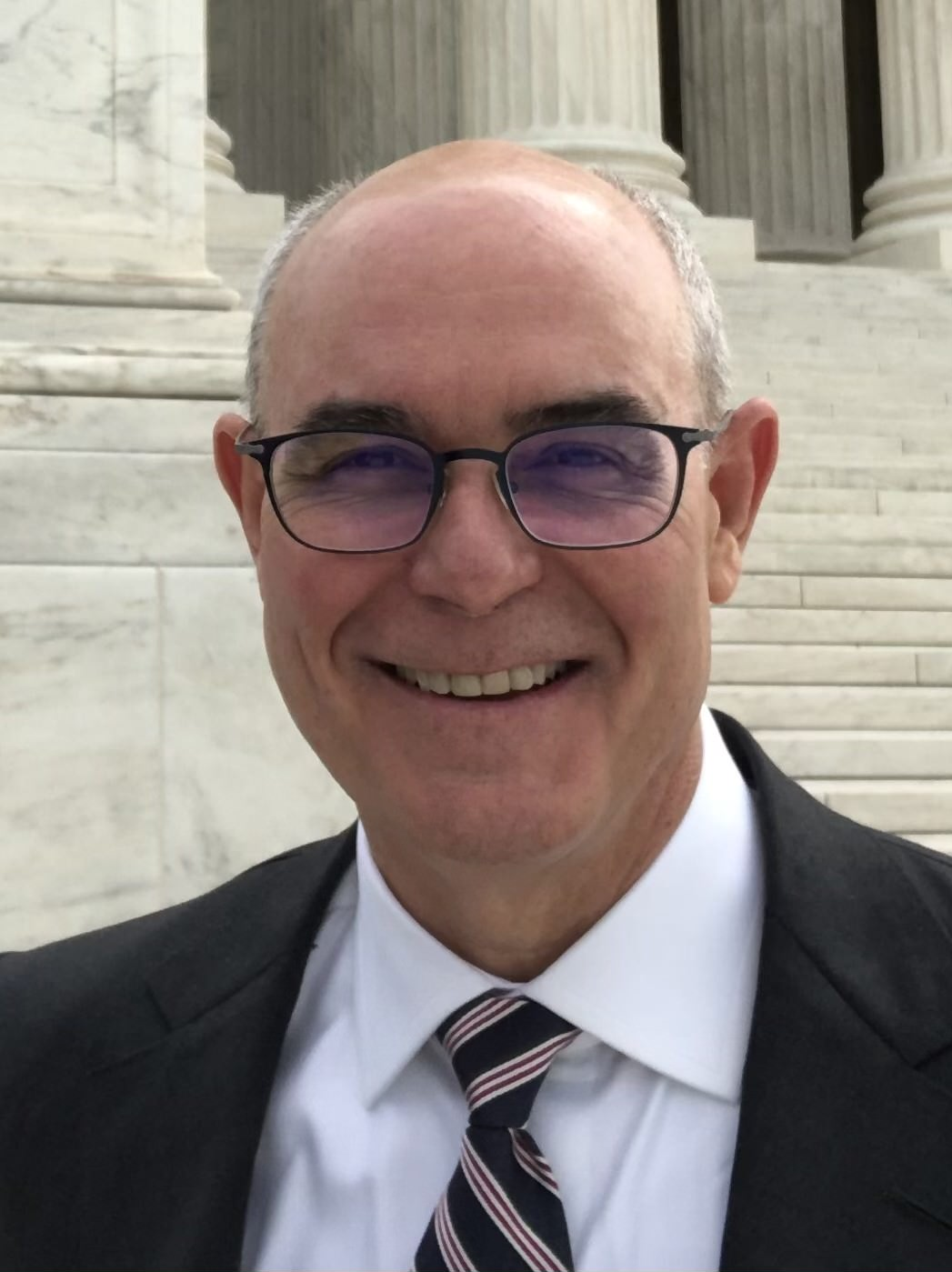
- Frederick in 2021
- Born: David Charles Frederick; April 9, 1961 (age 65); Shields, Illinois, U.S.
- Education: University of Pittsburgh (BA); University College, Oxford (MA, DPhil); University of Texas, Austin (JD)
- Political party: Democratic

David Charles Frederick (born April 9, 1961) is an appellate attorney in Washington, D.C., and is a name partner at Kellogg, Hansen, Todd, Figel & Frederick He has argued over 60 cases before the Supreme Court.

== Education and legal training ==
Born on Naval Station Great Lakes, Frederick earned a bachelor's degree in 1983 from the University of Pittsburgh. Frederick obtained a Doctor of Philosophy degree from University College, Oxford in 1987 as a Rhodes Scholar. In 1989, Frederick earned a Juris Doctor from the University of Texas School of Law in Austin, where he also served as articles editor for the Texas Law Review.

== Professional career ==
After law school, Frederick clerked for Judge Joseph T. Sneed of the United States Court of Appeals for the Ninth Circuit and Justice Byron R. White of the U.S. Supreme Court. In 1995, he was named counselor to the Inspector General. One year later, he became an assistant to the Solicitor General, a position he held until 2001. During his time with the Solicitor General's Office he earned the Department of Justice Inspector General’s Award for Exceptional Service, the Attorney General’s Distinguished Service Award and the Coast Guard Medal for Distinguished Public Service.

Frederick has argued more than sixty cases in the Supreme Court of the United States, across a wide range of issues and industries. Frederick's victories often strengthen plaintiff and consumer interests. Throughout his career, he has demonstrated an ability to persuade conservative justices to take pro-consumer positions.

=== Pharmaceutical industry ===
In Wyeth v. Levine (6-3), Frederick helped to convince Justices Stevens, Ginsburg, Kennedy, Souter, Breyer and Thomas that federal approval of labels that provide warnings about side effects of drugs do not bar lawsuits claiming inadequate warnings of a health risk in state law. In the case, Diana Levine sued Wyeth for failing to warn patients that the drug Phenergan could cause gangrene when administered using direct IV injection. The 2009 verdict, which affirmed a ruling by the Vermont Supreme Court, was a victory for Levine and for victims who could continue bringing their cases to state courts.

In 2010, in Merck & Co. v. Reynolds, Frederick argued against the application of a statute of limitations for securities fraud cases based on mere inquiry notice of potential fraud. In this particular case, shareholders sued Merck after the value of $10 billion Vioxx tanked due to concerns about dangerous side effects. The plaintiffs argued that Merck withheld information about the dangers of the drug. Merck asserted a statute of limitations defense, which would have ended before the shareholders had knowledge of all the requisite elements of fraud, but Frederick argued that the statute of limitations should not begin until the plaintiff has enough facts to survive a motion to dismiss.

The next year, in Matrixx Initiatives, Inc. v. Siracusano (9-0), Frederick argued that statistics involving adverse drug event reports could not negate materiality as a matter of law in a securities fraud suit if the number of adverse reports was not "statistically significant", upholding the decision of the Ninth Circuit.

In 2013, Frederick successfully represented Kaiser in defending a $142 million jury verdict against Pfizer for fraudulent off-label marketing of Neurontin.

In 2019, Frederick successfully represented Fosamax patients in a challenge by Merck to personal injury claims. After remand, Frederick again persuaded the Third Circuit to uphold the patients' rights to sue Merck.

=== Sports industry ===
==== NFL concussion settlement ====
In 2013, Frederick and a team of lawyers represented 4,500 retired NFL players in a high-profile case against the National Football League. Frederick represented the retired players at oral argument in the district court against the NFL’s motion to dismiss the complaints on the ground of preemption under the Labor-Management Relations Act. Among other arguments, Frederick argued that the NFL actively concealed the health risks of concussions to NFL players. The case reached a $765 million settlement to fund medical exams, concussion-related compensation and medical research.

==== MASN ====
Frederick represented the Mid-Atlantic Sports Network (MASN) during negotiations with Comcast to bring the Washington Nationals and Baltimore Orioles to Comcast's programming lineup in the Washington D.C. area. Frederick also represented MASN through three successful Federal Communications Commission (FCC) arbitration rulings against Time Warner Cable.

=== Common Herbicides ===
In Bates v. Dow AgroSciences LLC, Frederick represented a group of peanut farmers from Texas whose crops had burned after the application of an herbicide produced by respondent Dow AgroSciences. The court held in 2005 that the Federal Insecticide, Fungicide, and Rodenticide Act’s express preemption provision does not preclude a range of claims that farmers might bring against manufacturers of agricultural pesticides and insecticides.

In Hardeman v. Monsanto, Frederick successfully persuaded the Supreme Court not to review the ruling of a lower court that awarded $25.2 million to Edwin Hardemen, a San Francisco man who was diagnosed with cancer after using Roundup, made by Monsanto, on his crops for 26 years. Shortly thereafter he persuaded the Supreme Court to also uphold the ruling in a similar case, Pilliod v. Monsanto.

=== 2008 financial crisis ===
With Korein Tillery as co-counsel, Frederick led the outside litigation team on behalf of the National Credit Union Administration to recover more than $5.2 billion against Wall Street banks for their role in the 2008 financial crisis. Wall Street banks had sold faulty mortgage-backed securities to the largest credit unions. When those securities failed, the credit union system was threatened. Frederick's team successfully recovered from the largest banks on Wall Street for their role in causing the failures of those credit unions and earned $506.3 million in contingency fees.

=== Opioid Crisis ===
From 2018 to 2022, Frederick led a team from Kellogg, Hansen, Todd, Figel & Frederick as lead litigation counsel for the state of Florida that recovered more than $3.6 billion against opioid manufacturers, distributors, and leading retail pharmacies for their role in causing the opioid epidemic.

=== Other noteworthy cases ===
Other noteworthy cases argued by Frederick include: South Carolina v. North Carolina, Idaho v. United States, New Jersey v. Delaware, United States v. Locke, Farina v. Nokia, Inc., Carter v. United States, and California v. Deep Sea Research. He has argued cases in all of the thirteen U.S. courts of appeals.

In 2001, Frederick represented the United States in oral arguments before the U.S. Court of Appeals for the D.C. Circuit in United States v. Microsoft Corporation in an appeal of the landmark antitrust trial that had held Microsoft Corporation liable for violating antitrust laws.

In 2008, Altria Group, Inc. v. Good examined whether state-law fraud claims against cigarette makers for allegedly false statements made about light cigarettes are preempted under the federal statute that concerns tobacco labeling. In a 5–4 decision, the court held that state-law claims sounding in fraud against tobacco companies are not preempted by the express preemption provision of the federal labeling statute.

Additionally, in Jones v. Harris, a 9–0 decision reached in 2010, Frederick persuaded the court to a unanimous decision in favor of investors, reversing a circuit court decision by Judge Frank Easterbrook. The plaintiffs had sued over exorbitant fees charged by mutual fund investment advisers.

In 2018, Frederick represented David Pepper as lead plaintiff in Apple Inc. v. Pepper. The case concerned Apple's monopoly on iPhone apps. Apple challenged whether the consumers could sue for antitrust violations, but the Supreme Court ruled, 5-4, in the consumers' favor. The Court ruled that consumers had the right to sue Apple for practices it employed relating to its App Store.

Also in 2018, Frederick represented AFSCME Council 31 before the Supreme Court in Janus v. American Federation of State, County, and Municipal Employees, County 31. The case decided in favor of petitioner Mark Janus, ruling the collection of agency fees by public sector unions unconstitutional in a 5–4 decision. This overruled precedent set in Abood v. Detroit Board of Education, which the opinion of the court described as poorly reasoned, unworkable, and an outlier among the Supreme Court's First Amendment cases.

In 2021, Frederick represented the state of Tennessee in Mississippi v. Tennessee. In that case, Mississippi made the claim that it held property ownership rights to an aquifer that straddled the border of both states. Frederick successfully persuaded the Supreme Court to rule in favor of Tennessee, 9-0. The court ruled that groundwater is subject to equitable apportionment between the states.

=== Speculated possible federal service ===
Frederick was part of the Obama-Biden Legal Policy Team and was rumored to be on President Obama's short list for Solicitor General.

On May 27, 2013, the New York Times reported that President Obama was considering nominating Frederick to one of three vacancies on the United States Court of Appeals for the District of Columbia Circuit.

== Publications ==
Frederick is the author of dozens of legal articles and three books:

- Supreme Court and Appellate Advocacy (West, 4th Edition, 2025)
- The Art of Oral Advocacy (West, 3rd Edition, 2019)
- Rugged Justice: The Ninth Circuit Court of Appeals and the American West, 1891-1941 (Berkeley: University of California Press, 1994)

== Philanthropy ==
At the University of Pittsburgh, Frederick created a scholarship to support tuition for six full-time undergraduate students who work part- or full-time jobs to pay for their education. He also established the David C. Frederick Public Service Internship Award, which supports unpaid public service summer internships, granted by the University Honors College and the Department of Political Science. Frederick serves on the board of the Smithsonian National Museum of American History. In February 2022, Frederick was elected as a University College Foundation Fellow at his Oxford alma mater, donating $35 million toward new facilities in July 2022. In June 2022, Frederick was elected to the board of trustees at his alma mater, the University of Pittsburgh, and after a multi-million dollar donation in the following month, the honors college has been named after him.

== Personal life ==
Frederick married his wife, Sophia Lynn, in 2007 and they live in McLean, Virginia. In October 2024, Frederick and Lynn were enshrined on the Clarendon Arch at Oxford University, and Frederick was inducted as a Fellow in the Chancellor's Court of Benefactors.

== See also ==
- List of law clerks for the sixth seat of the Supreme Court of the United States
