= Kellogg, Hansen, Todd, Figel & Frederick =

American law firm

Kellogg, Hansen, Todd, Figel & Frederick, PLLC
- Headquarters: Washington, DC
- No. of lawyers: 70
- Major practice areas: Trial litigation, appellate litigation, Supreme Court litigation
- Key people: Michael K. Kellogg, Mark C. Hansen, David C. Frederick
- Date founded: 1993
- Founder: Michael K. Kellogg; Peter W. Huber; Mark C. Hansen
- Company type: Professional limited liability company
- Website: www.kellogghansen.com

Kellogg, Hansen, Todd, Figel & Frederick, PLLC (formerly Kellogg, Huber, Hansen, Todd, Evans & Figel, PLLC) is an American law firm based in Washington, DC. It was founded in 1993 by three former Harvard Law School classmates (’82), Michael K. Kellogg, Peter W. Huber, and Mark C. Hansen.

Practice areas include commercial litigation, appellate litigation, antitrust litigation, telecommunications law, and governmental investigations. The firm won the two largest antitrust judgments in United States history (Conwood v. U.S. Tobacco and In re Urethanes Antitrust Litigation), as well as the seminal cases Bell Atlantic Corp. v. Twombly and American Express v. Italian Colors Restaurant.

Throughout its history, Kellogg Hansen has frequently represented clients in the telecommunications industry in their dealings with the Federal Communications Commission. Its clients have included AT&T and Verizon. The firm has also made a successful challenge to regulations that stemmed from the Telecommunications Act of 1996.

== History ==
Kellogg, Hansen, Todd, Figel & Frederick was formed in 1993 by Michael K. Kellogg, Peter W. Huber, and Mark C. Hansen, who formerly attended Harvard Law School together. The firm focused on trial and appellate litigation.

From its founding, the firm positioned itself as handling complex commercial, antitrust, and appellate cases, and by the mid-2020s had grown to more than ninety attorneys, most who had previously clerked for federal judges, including more than a dozen former U.S. Supreme Court clerks.

== Notable members and alumni ==
Current

- David Frederick

Former

- Neil Gorsuch, Associate Justice of the United States Supreme Court
- Andy Oldham, United States circuit judge of the United States Court of Appeals for the Fifth Circuit
- Paul Matey, United States circuit judge of the United States Court of Appeals for the Third Circuit
- Julius N. Richardson, United States circuit judge of the United States Court of Appeals for the Fourth Circuit
- James E. Boasberg, United States District Judge on the United States District Court for the District of Columbia
- Jeffrey A. Meyer, United States District Judge on the United States District Court for the District of Connecticut
- Eduardo Penalver
- Dan Markel
- Courtney Simmons Elwood, former general counsel of the Central Intelligence Agency
- Peter W. Huber, former name partner
- Saritha Komatireddy (born 1984 or 1985), federal prosecutor and former chief of staff of the U.S. Drug Enforcement Administration, Republican nominee for attorney general of New York in the 2026 election.
- Richard H. Stern
- Howard Shelanski
- Rachel Barkow
