= The World According to Star Wars =

Book by Cass Sunstein

The World According to Star Wars is a book written by Cass Sunstein about the Star Wars franchise. The book analyzes the themes in Star Wars. It uses the series to discuss behavioral psychology.
