= Howard Shelanski =

American lawyer and economist

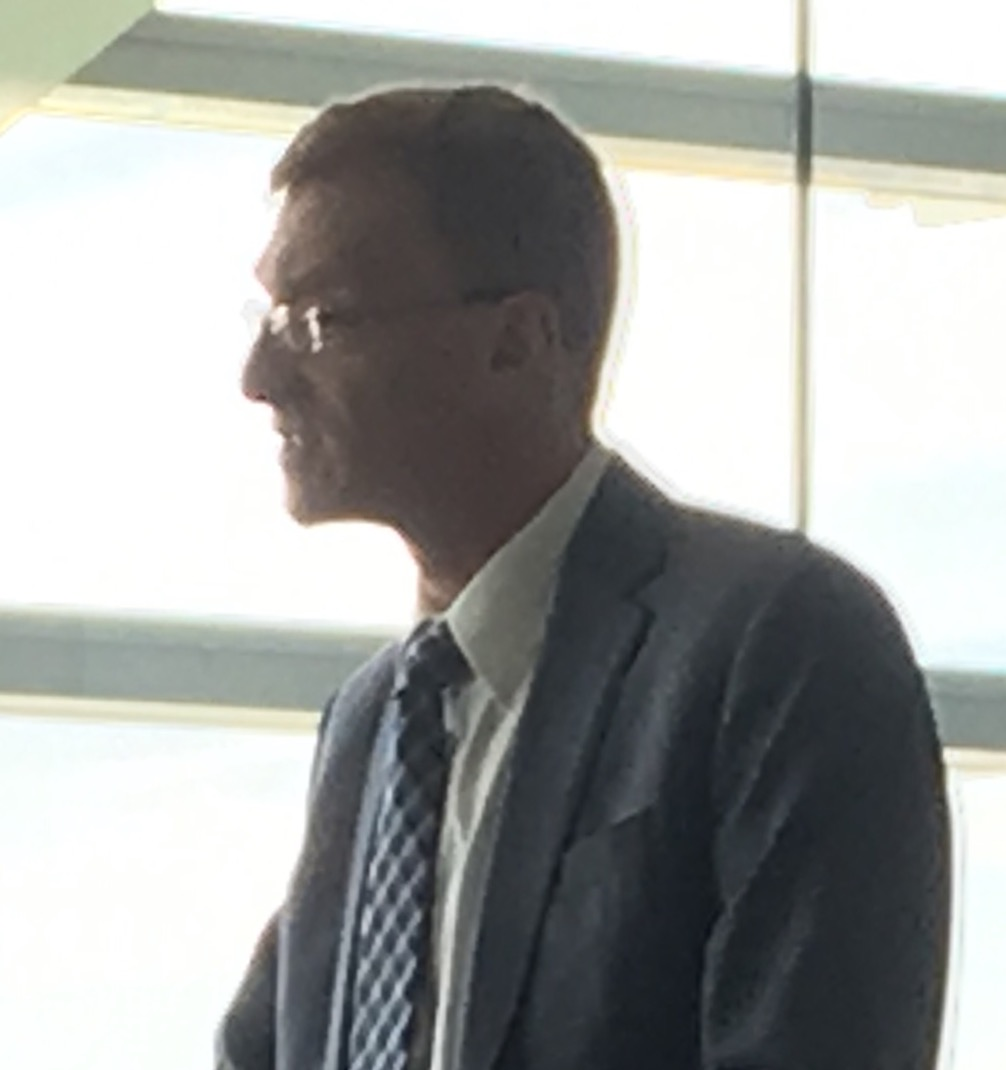

Administrator of the Office of Information and Regulatory Affairs
- In office June 27, 2013 – January 20, 2017
- President: Barack Obama
- Preceded by: Cass Sunstein
- Succeeded by: Neomi Rao

Personal details
- Born: 1964 (age 61–62) Philadelphia, Pennsylvania, U.S.
- Party: Democratic
- Education: Haverford College (BA); University of California, Berkeley (JD, PhD)

Howard Shelanski (born 1964) is an American attorney, economist, and legal scholar. He is a professor of law at Georgetown University, where he holds the Sheehy Chair in Antitrust Law and Trade Regulation, and a partner in the law firm of Davis, Polk & Wardwell. He served in the Obama administration as administrator of the Office of Information and Regulatory Affairs (OIRA), part of the Office of Management and Budget.

== Early life and education ==
Howard Shelanski was born in Philadelphia. He received his Bachelor of Arts from Haverford College in 1986, his Juris Doctor from the UC Berkeley School of Law in 1992, and his Ph.D. in economics from University of California, Berkeley in 1993.

== Career ==
After graduating from law school Shelanski clerked for Judge Stephen F. Williams of the U.S. Court of Appeals for the D.C. Circuit, Judge Louis H. Pollak of the U.S. District Court in Philadelphia, and Justice Antonin Scalia of the United States Supreme Court. He practiced law with the Washington, D.C. firm of Kellogg Huber Hansen Todd & Evans until 1997. He joined the Berkeley faculty in 1997, where he remained until moving to Georgetown Law in 2011. Shelanski's teaching and research have focused on antitrust and regulation.

Shelanski was senior economist for the Council of Economic Advisers from 1998 to 1999, chief economist of the Federal Communications Commission from 1999 to 2000, deputy director from 2009 to 2011, and Director of the Federal Trade Commission's Bureau of Economics from 2012 to 2013. President Obama nominated Shelanski to be administrator of the Office of Information and Regulatory Affairs on April 25, 2013, and he was confirmed to the post on June 27, 2013. He left office on January 20, 2017.

== See also ==
- List of law clerks for the ninth seat of the Supreme Court of the United States

Political offices
Preceded by Cass Sunstein	Administrator of the Office of Information and Regulatory Affairs; 2013–2017	Succeeded by Neomi Rao
