= Office of Information and Regulatory Affairs =

Subagency within the US Government

- OIRA

Agency overview
- Formed: 1980
- Preceding agency: Office of Regulatory and Information Policy
- Jurisdiction: Federal government of the United States
- Headquarters: Washington, D.C.
- Agency executive: Mark Paoletta, Administrator (performing delegated duties)
- Parent agency: Office of Management and Budget
- Website: www.reginfo.gov/public/

The Office of Information and Regulatory Affairs (OIRA /oʊˈaɪrə/ oh-EYE-rə) is a division within the Office of Management and Budget under the Executive Office of the President. OIRA oversees the implementation of government-wide policies in, and reviews draft regulations under, Executive Order 12866, the Paperwork Reduction Act, and the Information Quality Act.

== Tasks ==
OIRA reviews draft rules that it receives from federal agencies under the three laws noted in the preamble to this article, and develops and oversees the implementation of government-wide policies in the areas of information technology, information policy, privacy, and statistical policy.

As one step in the entire rulemaking process (as explained in more detail in United States administrative law), OIRA reviews draft rules and regulations under 12866 from 1993. Executive Order 12866 describes OIRA's role in the rulemaking process and directs agencies to follow certain principles, such as consideration of alternatives and analysis of impacts, both benefits and costs. OIRA reviews draft regulations to ensure agency compliance with this executive order.

== History and jurisdiction ==
=== Cost/benefit analysis—Executive Order 12866 and its predecessors ===
Presidential regulatory principles and the centralized review of draft regulations had been part of U.S. regulatory development for decades. President Nixon's "Quality of Life" program involved such review, and President Ford's Executive Order 11821 in 1974 required agencies to prepare inflation/economic impact statements.

A predecessor office had existed at Office of Management and Budget, OMB, an agency within the Executive Office of the President for many years; from 1977 to 1981, it was briefly at the Department of Commerce. It continued with President Jimmy Carter's Executive Order 12044 on "Improving Government Regulations."

Today, about 20% of all regulations flow through OIRA for cost-benefit regulatory review under Executive Order 12866.

=== Paperwork Reduction Act, 1981 ===
Congress passed the Paperwork Reduction Act of 1980 (Pub. L. 96–511) and its successor, the Paperwork Reduction Act of 1995 (Pub. L. 104–13 (text) (PDF)), that established OIRA in the OMB.

The OMB review process became more formalized in 1981 with President Ronald Reagan's Executive Order 12291. During his administration, the White House had reviewed 2,000 to 3,000 regulations per year. It continued during the George H. W. Bush Administration and the first nine months of the Clinton administration.

In September 1993, President Bill Clinton issued Executive Order 12866, and the total dropped to between 500 and 700 annually. The executive order states OIRA should focus on "economically significant" rules. Of the 500 to 700 rules reviewed by OIRA annually, about 100 have been classified as "economically significant". In 1995, the Paperwork Reduction Act was updated.

In January 2007, President George W. Bush signed Executive Order 13422, which changed the rules as of July 24, 2007. The Executive Order covers federal agencies' "guidance documents", in addition to regulations. Its stated purpose was to ensure that agencies comply with the regulatory principles stated in Executive Order 12866 and that the President's policies are reflected in agency rules. It also specified procedures for the resolution of conflicts between or among agencies. In July 2007, controversy arose in the U.S. Congress over this order giving the OIRA additional powers. The House of Representatives voted to prohibit OIRA from spending federal money on Executive Order 13422.

In January 2011, President Barack Obama issued Executive Order 13563 to improve regulation and regulatory review.

OIRA guides and coordinates agencies with respect to Circular A4, Information Quality Guidelines, and the Bulletin for Agency Good Guidance Practices.

== Organization ==
The office has five branches:

1. Food, Health, and Labor Branch
2. Information Policy Branch
3. Natural Resources and Environment Branch
4. Statistical & Science Policy Branch
5. Transportation and Security Branch

== Administrators ==
Image	Name	Start date	End date
	James C. Miller III	January 1981	September 1981
	Christopher C. DeMuth	October 1981	May 1984
	Douglas H. Ginsburg	1984	1985
	Wendy Lee Gramm	October 1985	February 1988
	S. Jay Plager	1988	1989
	Jim MacRae (acting)	1989	1993
	Sally Katzen	1993	1998
	Don Arbuckle (acting)	March 1997	June 1999
	John T. Spotila	July 1999	December 2000
	Don Arbuckle (acting)	January 2001	July 2001
	John Graham	2001	March 2006
	Steve Aiken (acting)	April 2006	March 2007
	Susan Dudley	April 4, 2007	January 20, 2009
	Kevin Neyland (acting)	January 20, 2009	September 10, 2009
	Cass Sunstein	September 10, 2009	August 21, 2012
	Boris Bershteyn (acting)	August 21, 2012	June 27, 2013
	Howard Shelanski	June 27, 2013	January 20, 2017
	Dominic Mancini (acting)	January 20, 2017	July 18, 2017
	Neomi Rao	July 18, 2017	March 18, 2019
	Dominic Mancini (acting)	March 2019	
	Paul J. Ray (acting)	March 2019	January 10, 2020
	Paul J. Ray	January 10, 2020	January 20, 2021
	Dominic Mancini (acting)	January 20, 2021	April 22, 2021
	Sharon Block (acting)	April 22, 2021	February 1, 2022
	Dominic Mancini (acting)	February 1, 2022	January 2023
	Richard Revesz	January 2023	January 20, 2025
	Dominic Mancini (acting)	January 20, 2025	March 5, 2025
	Jeffrey Clark (acting)	March 5, 2025	March 4, 2026
	Mark Paoletta (performing delegated duties)	March 4, 2026	present

== Criticism ==
ProPublica released an investigation into the division as one that has since its creation had significant but little-known power to alter regulations. It has been controversial since its inception in the 1980s. It has been given significant authority over administrative agencies through executive orders signed by presidents of both parties. It also conducts much of its business in secret and is exempt from most Freedom of Information Act requests. It also "routinely declines to release the changes it has proposed, the evidence it has relied upon to make them, or the identities and affiliations of White House advisers and other agencies' staff it has consulted". It has also been successfully used by lobbyists to alter draft regulations, with a 2003 GAO report stating "'regulated parties,' typically corporations or their lobbyists, frequently get what they want after meetings with OIRA."

A 2011 report from the Center on Progressive Reform stated that in 10 years, OIRA altered 84 percent of EPA rule submissions (as well as 65 percent of proposed rules from other agencies). The EPA's new rules on ozone pollution developed since September 2009, rolled out as tougher draft standards in January 2010, were repeatedly delayed.

== See also ==
- Council on Wage and Price Stability
