= Susan Dudley =

American academic

Administrator of the Office of Information and Regulatory Affairs
- In office April 4, 2007 – January 20, 2009
- President: George W. Bush
- Preceded by: Steve Aiken (acting)
- Succeeded by: Kevin Neyland (acting)

Personal details
- Born: Susan Elaine Dudley; May 27, 1955 (age 70) Massachusetts, U.S.
- Party: Republican
- Education: University of Massachusetts, Amherst (BS); Massachusetts Institute of Technology (MS)

Susan Elaine Dudley (born May 27, 1955) is an American academic who served as Administrator of the Office of Information and Regulatory Affairs (OIRA), Office of Management and Budget in the administration of George W. Bush. As such, Dudley was the top regulatory official at the White House. She is a distinguished Professor of Practice at the George Washington University Trachtenberg School of Public Policy and Public Administration.

== Early life ==
Dudley was born in Massachusetts. Dudley is married to Brian F. Mannix, an economist who also was a political appointee at the Environmental Protection Agency, serving as Associate Administrator for Policy, Economics, and Innovation from September 18, 2005, until January 20, 2009.

== Career ==
Currently, Dudley is a Distinguished Professor of Practice at the George Washington University Trachtenberg School of Public Policy and Public Administration. In September 2009, she founded the George Washington University Regulatory Studies Center, which "raise[s] awareness of regulations’ effects and improve[s] regulatory policy through research, education, and outreach." In September 2010 Dudley was appointed as a member of the Administrative Conference of the United States. As of January 2015 she is Vice-President, and President-Elect, of the Society for Benefit-Cost Analysis.

Bush first nominated Dudley to serve as the OIRA Administrator on July 31, 2006. The Senate Governmental Affairs and Homeland Security Committee held a hearing on Dudley’s nomination on November 13, but did not hold a vote to confirm her. Bush re-nominated Dudley on January 9, 2007; appointed her to serve as a senior advisor at OIRA on January 30, 2007; and gave her a recess appointment as OIRA Administrator on April 4, 2007. On January 6, 2009, the recess appointment expired and Bush designated Dudley as Acting Administrator of OIRA until his term of office ended on January 20, 2009.

From 1998 through January 2007, Dudley worked at the non-profit Mercatus Center at George Mason University, where she directed the Regulatory Studies Program from 2003 to 2006. As an adjunct professor at the George Mason University School of Law from 2002 to 2006, she designed and taught courses on regulations and led regulatory clinics. Earlier in her career, Dudley served as a career civil servant, working as a policy analyst at the Environmental Protection Agency (1984-1985), an economist at OIRA (1985 – 1989), and an economist advisor at the Commodity Futures Trading Commission (1989 - 1991). From 1991 until 1998, she was Vice President and Director of Environmental Analysis at Economists Incorporated, a consulting firm.

Dudley has authored more than 25 publications on regulatory matters, including e-rulemaking, electricity, health care, the environment, and occupational safety. She has served on the boards of the Association of Private Enterprise Education, the International Foundation for Research in Experimental Economics—founded by Nobel Prize–winning economist Vernon L. Smith, and the National Federation of Independent Business Legal Foundation (now the NFIB Small Business Legal Center). She has also served as a member of several committees and boards in the Commonwealth of Virginia, including the Virginia Environmental Education Advisory Committee (2000-2002), the Administrative Law Advisory Committee (2000-2003), and the Virginia Waste Management Board (1996-2001).

Dudley holds a Master of Science degree from the MIT Sloan School of Management (1981) and a Bachelor of Science degree (summa cum laude) in Resource Economics from the University of Massachusetts Amherst (1977).

In 2023, Susan joined the Regulatory Advisory Board of Norm Ai.

== Controversies ==
Dudley has been termed a conservative academic and her work at the Mercatus ("Market," in Latin) Center generally promoted market solutions over government regulation. She argued, for example, that consumers should be able to choose the efficiency of their household appliances, rather than have the government set energy efficiency standards. She also famously argued against an EPA effort to reduce surface ozone stating that the EPA's proposal would lead to significantly more skin cancers and cataracts.

On July 11, 2008, Dudley publicly objected to EPA's analysis of various ways to control greenhouse gases under the Clean Air Act, and transmitted the objections of four cabinet members and four other agency heads. All of these objections were published along with EPA's analysis, which it prepared in response to the April 2007 Supreme Court ruling that EPA has authority to regulate greenhouse gases. The act of an administration publishing a document and disavowing its own conclusions was described as an "extraordinary move" by the Wall Street Journal and "tortured policy" by the Washington Post. On April 17, 2009, the Obama administration took the next administrative step under the Clean Air Act by finding that greenhouse gases endanger public health and the environment; however, it reaffirmed the Bush administration's position that legislative action by Congress would be far preferable.

== See also ==
List of U.S. executive branch 'czars'
