= Neomi Rao =

American judge (born 1973)

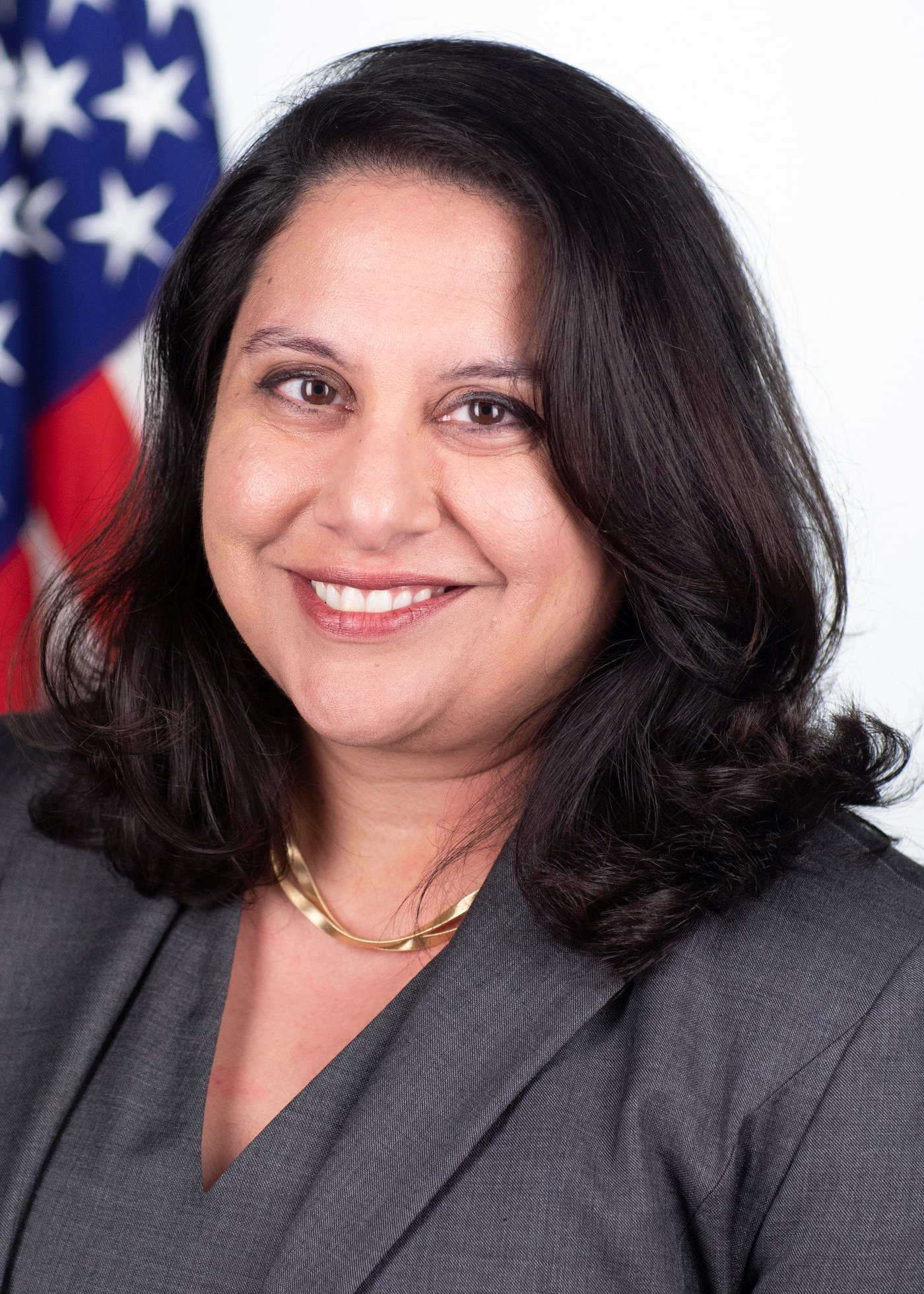
- Official portrait, 2018

Judge of the United States Court of Appeals for the District of Columbia Circuit
- Incumbent
- Assumed office March 18, 2019
- Appointed by: Donald Trump
- Preceded by: Brett Kavanaugh

Administrator of the Office of Information and Regulatory Affairs
- In office July 18, 2017 – March 18, 2019
- President: Donald Trump
- Preceded by: Dom Mancini (acting)
- Succeeded by: Dom Mancini (acting)

Personal details
- Born: Neomi Jehangir Rao; 1973 (age 52–53) Detroit, Michigan, U.S.
- Spouse: Alan Lefkowitz
- Children: 2
- Education: Yale University (BA); University of Chicago (JD)

Neomi Jehangir Rao (born 1973) is an American jurist and legal scholar serving as a United States circuit judge of the United States Court of Appeals for the District of Columbia Circuit. She was appointed in 2019 by President Donald Trump, having served in the Trump administration from 2017 to 2019 as administrator of the Office of Information and Regulatory Affairs. She was previously a professor of law at the Antonin Scalia Law School of George Mason University.

== Early life and education ==
Rao was born in 1973 in Detroit. Her parents, Zerin and Jehangir Narioshang Rao, were Parsi physicians from India who immigrated to the United States in 1972. She grew up in Bloomfield Hills, Michigan, and attended Detroit Country Day School, graduating in 1991. She has since converted to Judaism.

After high school, Rao studied ethics, politics, economics and philosophy at Yale University, graduating in 1995 with a Bachelor of Arts, cum laude. From 1995 to 1996, Rao was a reporter for The Weekly Standard. She then attended the University of Chicago Law School, where she was a comment editor of the University of Chicago Law Review and executive editor of a symposium issue of the Harvard Journal of Law and Public Policy. She graduated in 1999 with a Juris Doctor with high honors and Order of the Coif membership.

== Career ==
After law school, Rao was a law clerk to Judge J. Harvie Wilkinson III of the United States Court of Appeals for the Fourth Circuit from 1999 to 2000. She was legal counsel to the Senate Judiciary Committee from 2000 to 2001, then clerked for Justice Clarence Thomas of the United States Supreme Court from 2001 to 2002.

In 2002, Rao entered private practice in London with the British law firm Clifford Chance, where she practiced public international law and arbitration. From 2005 to 2006, during the presidency of George W. Bush, Rao was an associate with the White House Counsel. In 2006, she became a professor of law at the George Mason University School of Law (now Antonin Scalia Law School), where she received tenure in 2012. In 2015, she founded the Center for the Study of the Administrative State.

She is a member of the Administrative Conference of the United States and the governing council of the American Bar Association's Section of Administrative Law and Regulatory Practice, where she co-chairs the section's regulatory policy committee. She is a member of the Federalist Society.

=== Office of Information and Regulatory Affairs ===
On April 7, 2017, President Donald Trump nominated Rao to become the administrator of the Office of Information and Regulatory Affairs (OIRA) within the Office of Management and Budget. Former OIRA Administrator Susan Dudley, who served under President George W. Bush, called Rao "an excellent choice to lead OIRA...In addition to a sharp legal mind, she brings an openness to different perspectives and an ability to manage the competing demands of regulatory policy."

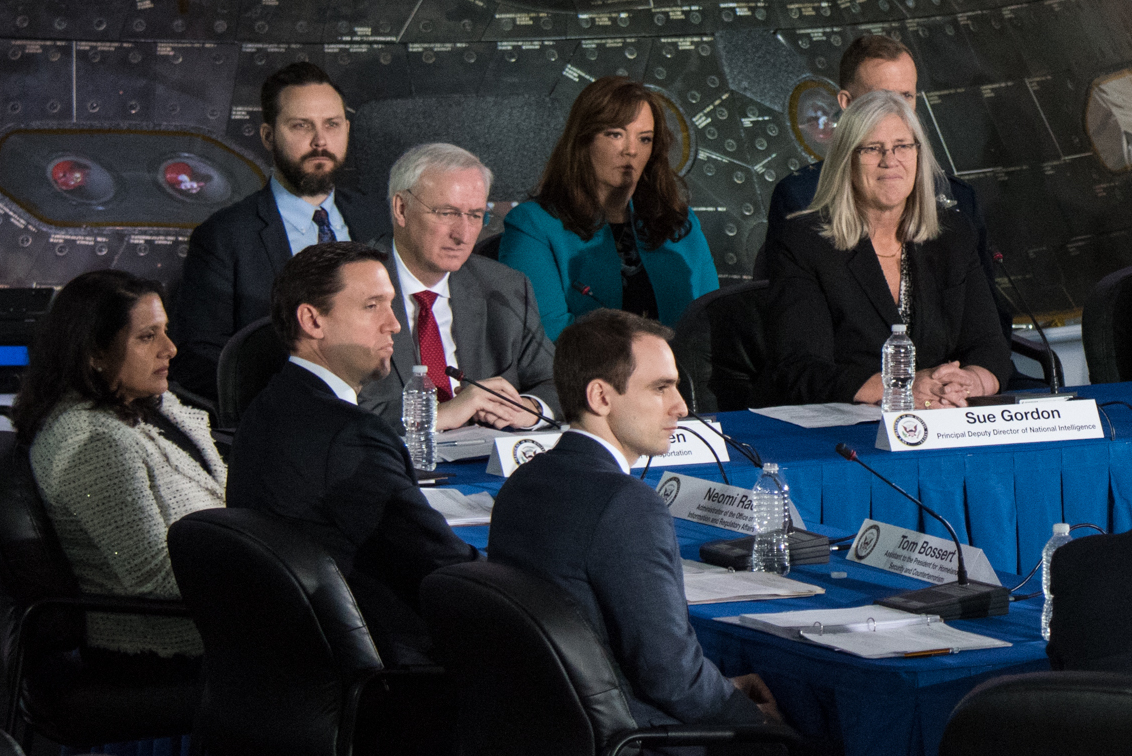
Rao (far left) at a National Space Council meeting in 2018

Legal commentator and law professor Jonathan H. Adler wrote, "Trump's selection of Rao suggests the administration is serious about regulatory reform, not merely reducing high-profile regulatory burdens." Opposition to Rao came from groups such as the League of Conservation Voters (LCV), which said she had "led efforts to roll back fundamental environmental protections" and "misuse[d] the regulatory review process for partisan political purposes." The United States Senate confirmed Rao to the position on July 10, 2017.

=== Federal judicial service ===
On November 13, 2018, Trump announced his intent to nominate Rao to serve on the United States Court of Appeals for the District of Columbia Circuit upon Judge Brett Kavanaugh's elevation to the Supreme Court of the United States. Her nomination was sent to the Senate that day. Upon the expiration of the congressional session on January 3, 2019, Rao's nomination was returned to the president under Rule XXXI, Paragraph 6, of the United States Senate. On January 23, 2019, Trump announced his intent to resubmit Rao's nomination. Her nomination was sent to the Senate that day.

Rao's nomination attracted opposition due to articles she wrote on race, sexual assault, feminism, multiculturalism, and people with disabilities.

Rao was criticized by disability rights activists such as Rebecca Cokley for a 2011 law review article and a blog post in which she expressed opposition to bans on dwarf-tossing.

Rao's confirmation hearing before the Senate Judiciary Committee was held on February 5, 2019. Asked by several senators about her college writings, some of which they viewed as sexual assault victim blaming, Rao responded: "A victim of a horrible crime is not to blame and the person who commits those crimes should be held responsible." Democrats expressed concern that rules Rao worked to repeal in her role as administrator of the White House Office of Information and Regulatory Affairs could face legal challenges and wind up before the District of Columbia Circuit Court of Appeals, which is considered the second-most powerful appeals court. Rao said she would "look carefully at the standards for recusal, consult with my colleagues, and follow the precedent and practices of the D.C. Circuit." Senator Josh Hawley questioned whether she was sufficiently socially conservative about abortion rights but voted for her confirmation.

On February 28, 2019, the Senate Judiciary Committee advanced Rao's nomination by a 12–10 vote. On March 12, the Senate invoked cloture on her nomination by a 53–46 vote. On March 13, Rao was confirmed by a 53–46 vote. She received her judicial commission on March 18, 2019.

=== Notable opinions ===
==== Trump v. Mazars (2019) ====
In an October 11, 2019, opinion of a three-judge panel of the United States Court of Appeals for the District of Columbia Circuit, Rao was the dissenter in a 2–1 ruling to affirm a district court ruling supporting a congressional subpoena for President Trump's records from the accounting firm Mazars. She wrote, "allegations of illegal conduct against the president cannot be investigated by Congress except through impeachment."

==== United States v. Flynn (2020) ====
Rao participated in the May 2020 appeal of Judge Emmet G. Sullivan's actions appointing amicus curiae in response to the United States Department of Justice moving to dismiss charges in United States v. Flynn. The appeals court initially ordered Sullivan to file a response to the appeal within ten days. On June 24, 2020, Rao, joined by Judge Karen Henderson, wrote the 2–1 decision to dismiss Flynn's conviction. Judge Robert Wilkins dissented. Observers were surprised because Henderson had expressed skepticism of the government's position during the hearing, saying, "I don't see why we don't observe regular order and allow him to rule". Flynn's lawyer, Sidney Powell, argued there was no longer any case or controversy, and the trial judge must dismiss the case against Flynn at the Justice Department's request. After vacating Rao's decision, the full court heard the case on August 11, with many judges expressing skepticism about upholding the ruling. On August 31, 2020, the appeals court en banc ruled 8–2 in favor of denying the writ of mandamus and not reassigning the case to a different district court judge, and remanded the case to Sullivan, with Rao writing in dissent, joined by Henderson.

==== Frederick Douglass Foundation, Inc. v. D.C. (2023) ====
In August 2023, Rao wrote the decision in Frederick Douglass Foundation, Inc. v. D.C., No. 21-7108 (D.C. Cir. 2023), overturning Judge James Boasberg's dismissal of a lawsuit against the District of Columbia and holding that the First Amendment prohibits government discrimination on the basis of viewpoint and that the protection for freedom of speech applies not only to legislation but also to enforcement of the law. The Frederick Douglass Foundation had filed suit following the arrest of two of its members for defacing government property by writing on the sidewalk in chalk without first obtaining a permit from the City. The Foundation claimed viewpoint discrimination because the City had routinely ignored unpermitted chalk and paint by other protest groups but arrested the Frederick Douglass Foundation members when they wrote anti-abortion messages. For the court, Rao wrote: "The government may not enforce the laws in a manner that picks winners and losers in public debates. It would undermine the First Amendment's protections for free speech if the government could enact a content-neutral law and then discriminate against disfavored viewpoints under the cover of prosecutorial discretion. Neutral regulations may reasonably limit the time, place, and manner of speech, but such regulations cannot be enforced based on the content or viewpoint of speech."

==== J.G.G. v. Trump (2025–2026) ====
In August 2025, Rao joined a per curiam decision in J.G.G. v. Trump, 147 F.4th 1044 (D.C. Cir. 2025), that granted the Trump administration's petition for a writ of mandamus and vacated Judge James Boasberg's probable cause order finding the administration in criminal contempt. The contempt proceedings arose from the government's March 15, 2025, deportation of more than 130 Venezuelan men to the CECOT prison in El Salvador under the Alien Enemies Act, in what Boasberg concluded was willful disregard of his oral order to turn the planes around. The D.C. Circuit unanimously dismissed the government's interlocutory appeal for lack of jurisdiction, but Rao and Judge Gregory Katsas wrote separate concurrences agreeing that mandamus was warranted, with Judge Cornelia Pillard dissenting. Rao concluded that the legal error was the district court's use of criminal contempt to force compliance with an order the Supreme Court had since vacated. On November 14, 2025, the D.C. Circuit denied rehearing en banc, though six of eleven active judges wrote separately to say Boasberg's contempt inquiry had been appropriate.

After Boasberg resumed the contempt inquiry on remand and ordered live testimony from government lawyers, the same panel of Rao, Justin Walker, and J. Michelle Childs issued an administrative stay in December 2025. On April 14, 2026, Rao wrote a 2–1 majority opinion ordering Boasberg to terminate the renewed inquiry, joined by Walker. Rao held that the administration had a "clear and indisputable" right to relief because the March 15, 2025, order had not been clear and specific enough to support criminal contempt, and because the government had already identified former Homeland Security Secretary Kristi Noem as the official who allowed the flights to proceed. Rao wrote that the district court "proposes to probe high-level Executive Branch deliberations about matters of national security and diplomacy" and that the proceedings were "a clear abuse of discretion", posing what she called a "judicial intrusion into the autonomy of a co-equal department." Childs dissented, writing that "contempt of court is a public offense, and the fate of our democratic republic will depend on whether we treat it as such" and warning that the majority's reasoning would let "any litigant" argue against contempt based on a preferred reading of a court's order before findings are even made. American Civil Liberties Union attorney Lee Gelernt said the plaintiffs would seek en banc review.

National Trust for Historic Preservation v. National Park Service (2026)

In April 2026, Rao dissented from a 2–1 D.C. Circuit ruling that remanded National Trust for Historic Preservation v. National Park Service to the district court for further factual development on the security implications of halting construction of a White House ballroom. The litigation arose after the Trump administration demolished the East Wing in October 2025 to make way for a 90,000-square-foot, roughly $300–400 million ballroom funded largely by private donations from corporations and individuals, with some public money for underground bunkers and security upgrades. The National Trust for Historic Preservation, a congressionally chartered nonprofit, sued in December 2025, arguing the project required congressional authorization and federal review. On March 31, 2026, Judge Richard J. Leon entered a preliminary injunction, concluding that no statute authorized the president to demolish a wing of the White House and replace it with a privately funded ballroom and that the action was likely ultra vires.

The panel of Judges Patricia Millett and Bradley Garcia returned the case to Leon to clarify how the injunction's "necessary for safety and security" exception would operate, citing an inadequate record on the asserted security need for the ballroom. Rao dissented: she would have stayed the injunction outright. She wrote that the district court had "halted construction based on the alleged aesthetic injury of one individual residing in Washington, D.C." and that the government had shown a strong likelihood of success on the merits both because the National Trust lacked Article III standing and because 3 U.S.C. § 105(d)(1) authorizes the president to undertake "improvement[s]" to the White House. According to Rao, the government had presented "credible evidence of ongoing security vulnerabilities at the White House that would be prolonged by halting construction" and that those concerns outweighed the "generalized aesthetic harms" claimed in the suit.

== Personal life ==
Rao is married to Alan Lefkowitz, a law school classmate, with whom she has two children. She converted to Judaism upon marrying Lefkowitz.

== Selected scholarly works ==
- Rao, Neomi (2008). "On the Use and Abuse of Dignity in Constitutional Law". Columbia Journal of European Law. 14 (2): 201–55.
- — (2011). "Three Concepts of Dignity in Constitutional Law". Notre Dame Law Review. 86 (1): 183–271.
- — (2011). "Public Choice and International Law: The Executive Branch Is a 'They,' Not an 'It'" (PDF). Minnesota Law Review. 96 (1): 194–277.
- — (2014). "Removal: Necessary and Sufficient for Presidential Control". Alabama Law Review. 65 (5): 1205–76.
- — (2015). "Administrative Collusion: How Delegation Diminishes the Collective Congress" (PDF). New York University Law Review. 90 (5): 1463–1526.
- — (2018). "Why Congress Matters: The Collective Congress in the Structural Constitution". Florida Law Review. 70 (1): 1–80.
- — (2021). "The Hedgehog and the Fox in Administrative Law". Daedalus. 150 (3): 220–41. doi:10.1162/daed_a_01869. JSTOR 48616703.

== See also ==
- Donald Trump Supreme Court candidates
- List of Asian American jurists
- List of Jewish American jurists
- List of law clerks for the tenth seat of the Supreme Court of the United States

Political offices
Preceded by Dom Mancini; Acting	Administrator of the Office of Information and Regulatory Affairs; 2017–2019	Succeeded by Dom Mancini; Acting
Legal offices
Preceded by Brett Kavanaugh	Judge of the United States Court of Appeals for the District of Columbia Circuit; 2019–present	Incumbent
