= Christine M. Jolls =

American legal scholar (born 1967)

- Born: October 1, 1967 (age 58)
- Occupations: Legal scholar; lawyer

Academic background
- Education: Stanford University (BA); Massachusetts Institute of Technology (PhD); Harvard Law School (JD)

Christine M. Jolls (born October 1, 1967) is the Gordon Bradford Tweedy Professor of Law and Organization at Yale Law School, where she has been since 2006. She is known for her work in the emerging theory of behavioral economics and law. Her areas of research include employment law and contracts.

== Early life and career ==
She received her B.A. in economics from Stanford University, a Ph.D. in economics from the Massachusetts Institute of Technology and her J.D. from Harvard Law School. She was a law clerk to Supreme Court Justice Antonin Scalia and taught at Harvard Law School. She collaborates with Professor Cass Sunstein of Harvard Law School.

== Selected publications ==
- Jolls, Christine; Sunstein, Cass R. (January 1, 2006). "Debiasing through Law". The Journal of Legal Studies. 35 (1): 199–242. doi:10.1086/500096. ISSN 0047-2530. S2CID 222332407.
- Jolls, Christine; Sunstein, Cass R. (2006). "The Law of Implicit Bias". California Law Review. 94 (4): 969–996. doi:10.2307/20439057. JSTOR 20439057.
- Jolls, Christine (2001–2002). "Antidiscrimination and Accommodation". Harvard Law Review. 115 (2): 642–699. doi:10.2307/1342674. JSTOR 1342674.
- Jolls, Christine; Sunstein, Cass R.; Thaler, Richard (1997–1998). "A Behavioral Approach to Law and Economics". Stanford Law Review. 50 (5): 1471–1550. doi:10.2307/1229304. JSTOR 1229304.

== See also ==
- List of law clerks for the ninth seat of the Supreme Court of the United States
