= Cass Sunstein =

American legal scholar (born 1954)

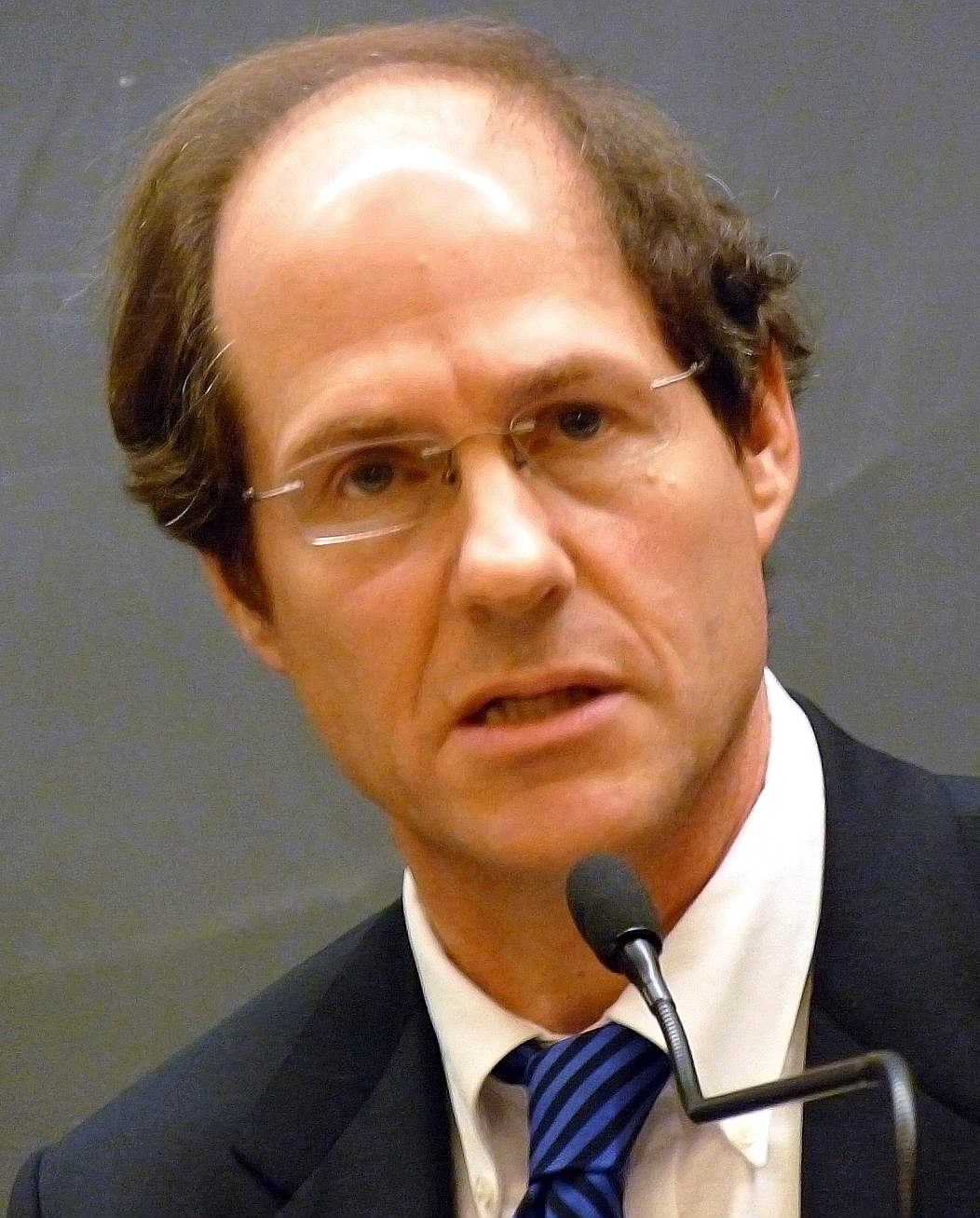
- Sunstein in 2008

Administrator of the Office of Information and Regulatory Affairs
- In office September 10, 2009 – August 21, 2012
- President: Barack Obama
- Preceded by: Kevin Neyland (acting)
- Succeeded by: Boris Bershteyn (acting)

Personal details
- Born: Cass Robert Sunstein; September 21, 1954 (age 72) Concord, Massachusetts, U.S.
- Party: Democratic
- Spouses: Lisa Ruddick (divorced) Samantha Power (m. 2008)
- Children: 3
- Education: Harvard University (BA, JD)
- Title: Robert Walmsley University Professor
- Awards: Holberg Prize (2018)

Academic work
- Discipline: Constitutional law
- Institutions: Harvard University; University of Chicago
- Notable works: The World According to Star Wars (2016); Nudge (2008)
- Notable ideas: Nudging

Cass Robert Sunstein (born September 21, 1954) is an American legal scholar known for his work in U.S. constitutional law, administrative law, environmental law, and behavioral economics. He is also The New York Times best-selling author of The World According to Star Wars (2016) and co-author of Nudge (2008). He was the administrator of the White House Office of Information and Regulatory Affairs in the Obama administration from 2009 to 2012.

Sunstein serves as the Robert Walmsley University Professor at Harvard Law School. He was previously a professor at the University of Chicago Law School from 1981 to 2008. In 2014, studies of legal publications found Sunstein to be the most frequently cited American legal scholar by a wide margin.

== Early life and education ==
Cass Robert Sunstein was born on September 21, 1954, in Salem, Massachusetts, to Marian (née Goodrich), a teacher, and Cass Richard Sunstein, a builder.

He said that as a teenager, he was briefly infatuated with the works of Ayn Rand,

"[b]ut after about six weeks of enchantment, her books started to make me sick. Contemptuous toward most of humanity, merciless about human frailty, and constantly hammering on the moral evils of redistribution, they produced a sense of claustrophobia."

Sunstein graduated from Middlesex School in 1972. He then went to Harvard College, where he was a member of the varsity Harvard Crimson men's squash team, and an editor of the Harvard Lampoon. He graduated in 1975 with a Bachelor of Arts, magna cum laude.

He then attended Harvard Law School, where he was an executive editor of the Harvard Civil Rights–Civil Liberties Law Review and was on the winning team of the Ames Moot Court Competition. He graduated in 1978 with a Juris Doctor, magna cum laude.

== Career ==
After law school, Sunstein was a law clerk to Justice Benjamin Kaplan of the Massachusetts Supreme Judicial Court from 1978 to 1979 and to Justice Thurgood Marshall of the U.S. Supreme Court from 1979 to 1980.

After his clerkships, Sunstein spent one year as an attorney-advisor in the U.S. Department of Justice's Office of Legal Counsel. In 1981, he became an assistant professor of law at the University of Chicago Law School (1981–1983), where he also became an assistant professor in the Department of Political Science (1983–1985). In 1985, Sunstein was made a full professor of both political science and law; in 1988, he was named the Karl N. Llewellyn Professor of Jurisprudence in the Law School and Department of Political Science. The university honored him in 1993 with its "distinguished service" accolade, permanently changing his title to Karl N. Llewellyn Distinguished Service Professor of Jurisprudence in the Law School and Department of Political Science. In 2009, Sunstein was described by fellow Chicago professor Douglas G. Baird as a "Chicago person through and through".

Sunstein was the Samuel Rubin Visiting Professor of Law at Columbia Law School in the fall of 1986 and a visiting professor at Harvard Law School in the spring 1987, winter 2005, and spring 2007 terms. He has taught courses in constitutional law, administrative law, and environmental law, as well as the required first-year course "Elements of the Law", which was an introduction to legal reasoning, legal theory, and the interdisciplinary study of law, including law and economics. In the fall of 2008, he joined the faculty of Harvard Law School and began serving as the director of its Program on Risk Regulation:

The Program on Risk Regulation will focus on how law and policy deal with the central hazards of the 21st century. Anticipated areas of study include terrorism, climate change, occupational safety, infectious diseases, natural disasters, and other low-probability, high-consequence events. Sunstein plans to rely on significant student involvement in the work of this new program.

On January 7, 2009, The Wall Street Journal reported that Sunstein would be named to head the White House Office of Information and Regulatory Affairs (OIRA). That news generated controversy among progressive legal scholars and environmentalists. Sunstein's confirmation was long blocked because of controversy over allegations about his political and academic views. On September 9, 2009, the Senate voted for cloture on Sunstein's nomination as Administrator of the Office of Information and Regulatory Affairs, Office of Management and Budget. The motion passed in a 63–35 vote. The Senate confirmed Sunstein on September 10, 2009, in a 57–40 vote.

In his research on risk regulation, Sunstein is known for developing, together with Timur Kuran, the concept of availability cascades, wherein popular discussion of an idea is self-feeding and causes individuals to over weigh its importance.

Sunstein's books include After the Rights Revolution (1990), The Partial Constitution (1993), Democracy and the Problem of Free Speech (1993), Legal Reasoning and Political Conflict (1996), Free Markets and Social Justice (1997), One Case at a Time (1999), Risk and Reason (2002), Why Societies Need Dissent (2003), Laws of Fear: Beyond the Precautionary Principle (2005), Radicals in Robes: Why Extreme Right-Wing Courts Are Wrong for America (2005), Are Judges Political? An Empirical Analysis of the Federal Judiciary (2005), Infotopia: How Many Minds Produce Knowledge (2006), and, co-authored with Richard Thaler, Nudge: Improving Decisions about Health, Wealth, and Happiness (2008).

Sunstein's 2006 book, Infotopia: How Many Minds Produce Knowledge, explores methods for aggregating information; it contains discussions of prediction markets, open-source software, and wikis. Sunstein's 2004 book, The Second Bill of Rights: FDR's Unfinished Revolution and Why We Need It More than Ever, advocates the Second Bill of Rights proposed by Franklin D. Roosevelt. Among these rights are a right to an education, a right to a home, a right to health care, and a right to protection against monopolies; Sunstein argues that the Second Bill of Rights has had a large international impact and should be revived in the United States. His 2001 book, Republic.com, argued that the Internet may weaken democracy because it allows citizens to isolate themselves within groups that share their own views and experiences, and thus cut themselves off from any information that might challenge their beliefs, a phenomenon known as cyberbalkanization.

Sunstein co-authored Nudge: Improving Decisions about Health, Wealth, and Happiness (Yale University Press, 2008) with economist Richard Thaler of the University of Chicago. Nudge discusses how public and private organizations can help people make better choices in their daily lives. Thaler and Sunstein argue that:

People often make poor choices – and look back at them with bafflement! We do this because as human beings, we all are susceptible to a wide array of routine biases that can lead to an equally wide array of embarrassing blunders in education, personal finance, health care, mortgages and credit cards, happiness, and even the planet itself.

The ideas in the book proved popular with politicians such as U.S. President Barack Obama, British Prime Minister David Cameron, and the British Conservative Party in general. The "Nudge" idea has also been criticized. Dr. Tammy Boyce, from public health foundation The King's Fund, has said:

We need to move away from short-term, politically motivated initiatives such as the 'nudging people' idea, which are not based on any good evidence and don't help people make long-term behavior changes.

Contributing to the anthology Our American Story (2019), Sunstein addressed the possibility of a shared American narrative. He cited the concepts of self-government and equal dignity of human beings, but focused in particular on stories: "an emphasis on what happened before and after the firing shots in Concord and the courageous response of the embattled farmers maintains continuity with the historical facts and offers us something on which we can build."

Sunstein is a contributing editor to The New Republic and The American Prospect and is a frequent witness before congressional committees. He played an active role in opposing the impeachment of Bill Clinton in 1998.

In recent years, Sunstein has been a guest writer on The Volokh Conspiracy blog as well as the blogs of law professors Lawrence Lessig (Harvard) and Jack Balkin (Yale). He is considered so prolific a writer that in 2007, an article in the legal publication The Green Bag coined the concept of a "Sunstein number" reflecting degrees of separation between various legal authors and Sunstein, paralleling the Erdős numbers sometimes assigned to mathematician authors.

He is a member of the American Academy of Arts and Sciences (elected 1992), the American Law Institute (since 1990), and the American Philosophical Society (elected 2010). He received an honorary doctorate from Copenhagen Business School.

In February 2020, he wrote an article for Bloomberg titled "The Cognitive Bias That Makes Us Panic About Coronavirus". In it he claimed that "A lot more people are more scared than they have any reason to be" and that "Most people in North America and Europe do not need to worry much about the risk of contracting the disease. That's true even for people who are traveling to nations such as Italy that have seen outbreaks of the disease." He attributed the excessive perceived risk to probability neglect. At the time of publication, there were 68 confirmed COVID-19 cases in the U.S., including one death, and approximately 1000 new daily cases worldwide, over 300 of which in Europe.

Sunstein joined the Department of Homeland Security in February 2021 as an advisor to the Biden administration on immigration policy.

Together with Daniel Kahneman and Olivier Sibony, Sunstein co-authored Noise: A Flaw in Human Judgment, which was published in May 2021. Drawing not least upon legal examples, it treats unwanted variability in human judgments of the same problem, for instance, when court judges recommend vastly different sentences for the same crimes. The book looks both at what 'noise in human judgment' is, how it can be detected, and how it can be reduced.

Since 2021, Sunstein has co-taught a class on the United States Supreme Court at Harvard alongside retired Justice Stephen Breyer.

== Views ==
=== Legal philosophy ===
Sunstein is a proponent of judicial minimalism, arguing that judges should focus primarily on deciding the case at hand, and avoid making sweeping changes to the law or decisions that have broad-reaching effects. Some view him as liberal, despite Sunstein's public support for George W. Bush's judicial nominees Michael W. McConnell and John G. Roberts, as well as providing strongly maintained theoretical support for the death penalty. Conservative libertarian legal scholar Richard A. Epstein described Sunstein as "one of the more conservative players in the Obama administration".

Much of his work also brings behavioral economics to bear on law, suggesting that the "rational actor" model will sometimes produce an inadequate understanding of how people will respond to legal intervention.

Sunstein has collaborated with academics who have training in behavioral economics, most notably Daniel Kahneman, Richard Thaler, and Christine M. Jolls, to show how the theoretical assumptions of law and economics should be modified by new empirical findings about how people actually behave.

According to Sunstein, the interpretation of federal law should be made not by judges but by the beliefs and commitments of the U.S. president and those around him. "There is no reason to believe that in the face of statutory ambiguity, the meaning of federal law should be settled by the inclinations and predispositions of federal judges. The outcome should instead depend on the commitments and beliefs of the President and those who operate under him", argued Sunstein.

Sunstein (along with his coauthor Richard Thaler) has elaborated the theory of libertarian paternalism. In arguing for this theory, he counsels thinkers/academics/politicians to embrace the findings of behavioral economics as applied to law, maintaining freedom of choice while also steering peoples' decisions in directions that will make their lives go better. With Thaler, he coined the term "choice architect".

=== Military commissions ===
In 2002, at the height of controversy over Bush's creation of military commissions without congressional approval, Sunstein stepped forward to insist, "Under existing law, President George W. Bush has the legal authority to use military commissions" and that "President Bush's choice stands on firm legal ground." Sunstein scorned as "ludicrous" an argument from law professor George P. Fletcher, who believed that the Supreme Court would find Bush's military commissions without any legal basis. In 2006, the Supreme Court found the tribunals illegal in Hamdan v. Rumsfeld in a 5–3 vote.

=== First Amendment ===
In his book Democracy and the Problem of Free Speech Sunstein says there is a need to reformulate First Amendment law. He thinks that the current formulation, based on Justice Holmes' conception of free speech as a marketplace, "disserves the aspirations of those who wrote America's founding document." The purpose of this reformulation would be to "reinvigorate processes of democratic deliberation, by ensuring greater attention to public issues and greater diversity of views." He is concerned by the present "situation in which like-minded people speak or listen mostly to one another", and thinks that in "light of astonishing economic and technological changes, we must doubt whether, as interpreted, the constitutional guarantee of free speech is adequately serving democratic goals." He proposes a "New Deal for speech [that] would draw on Justice Brandeis' insistence on the role of free speech in promoting political deliberation and citizenship."

=== Animal rights ===
Some of Sunstein's work has addressed the question of animal rights, as he co-authored a book dealing with the subject, has written papers on it, and was an invited speaker at "Facing Animals", an event at Harvard University described as "a groundbreaking panel on animals in ethics and the law". "Every reasonable person believes in animal rights", he says, continuing that "we might conclude that certain practices cannot be defended and should not be allowed to continue, if, in practice, mere regulation will inevitably be insufficient – and if, in practice, mere regulation will ensure that the level of animal suffering will remain very high."

Sunstein's views on animal rights generated controversy when Sen. Saxby Chambliss (R-Ga.) blocked his appointment to the Office of Information and Regulatory Affairs by Obama. Chambliss objected to the introduction of Animal Rights: Current Debates and New Directions, a volume edited by Sunstein and his then-companion Martha Nussbaum. On page 11 of the introduction, during a philosophical discussion about whether animals should be thought of as owned by humans, Sunstein notes that personhood need not be conferred upon an animal in order to grant it various legal protections against abuse or cruelty, even including legal standing for suit. For example, under current law, if someone saw their neighbor beating a dog, they cannot sue for animal cruelty because they do not have legal standing to do so. Sunstein suggests that granting standing to animals, actionable by other parties, could decrease animal cruelty by increasing the likelihood that animal abuse will be punished.

=== Taxation ===
Sunstein has argued, "We should celebrate tax day." Sunstein argues that since government (in the form of police, fire departments, insured banks, and courts) protects and preserves property and liberty, individuals should happily finance it with their tax dollars:

In what sense is the money in our pockets and bank accounts fully 'ours'? Did we earn it by our own autonomous efforts? Could we have inherited it without the assistance of probate courts? Do we save it without the support of bank regulators? Could we spend it if there were no public officials to coordinate the efforts and pool the resources of the community in which we live? Without taxes, there would be no liberty. Without taxes there would be no property. Without taxes, few of us would have any assets worth defending. [It is] a dim fiction that some people enjoy and exercise their rights without placing any burden whatsoever on the public... There is no liberty without dependency.

Sunstein goes on to say:

If government could not intervene effectively, none of the individual rights to which Americans have become accustomed could be reliably protected.... This is why the overused distinction between "negative" and "positive" rights makes little sense. Rights to private property, freedom of speech, immunity from police abuse, contractual liberty, free exercise of religion – just as much as rights to Social Security, Medicare and food stamps – are taxpayer-funded and government-managed social services designed to improve collective and individual well-being.

=== Marriage ===
In Nudge: Improving Decisions About Health, Wealth, and Happiness, Sunstein proposes that government recognition of marriage be discontinued. "Under our proposal, the word marriage would no longer appear in any laws, and marriage licenses would no longer be offered or recognized by any level of government", argues Sunstein. He continues, "the only legal status states would confer on couples would be a civil union, which would be a domestic partnership agreement between any two people." He goes on further, "Governments would not be asked to endorse any particular relationships by conferring on them the term marriage", and refers to state-recognized marriage as an "official license scheme". Sunstein addressed the Senate on July 11, 1996, advising against the Defense of Marriage Act.

=== Conspiracy theories and government infiltration ===
Sunstein co-authored a 2008 paper with Adrian Vermeule, titled "Conspiracy Theories", dealing with the risks and possible government responses to conspiracy theories resulting from "cascades" of faulty information within groups that may ultimately lead to violence. In this article they wrote, "The existence of both domestic and foreign conspiracy theories, we suggest, is no trivial matter, posing real risks to the government's antiterrorism policies, whatever the latter may be." They go on to propose that, "the best response consists in cognitive infiltration of extremist groups", where they suggest, among other tactics, "Government agents (and their allies) might enter chat rooms, online social networks, or even real-space groups and attempt to undermine percolating conspiracy theories by raising doubts about their factual premises, causal logic or implications for political action." They refer, several times, to groups that promote the view that the US Government was responsible or complicit in the September 11 attacks as "extremist groups". The authors declare that there are five hypothetical responses a government can take toward conspiracy theories: "We can readily imagine a series of possible responses. (1) Government might ban conspiracy theorizing. (2) Government might impose some kind of tax, financial or otherwise, on those who disseminate such theories. (3) Government might itself engage in counterspeech, marshaling arguments to discredit conspiracy theories. (4) Government might formally hire credible private parties to engage in counterspeech. (5) Government might engage in informal communication with such parties, encouraging them to help." However, the authors advocate that each "instrument has a distinctive set of potential effects, or costs and benefits, and each will have a place under imaginable conditions. However, our main policy idea is that government should engage in cognitive infiltration of the groups that produce conspiracy theories, which involves a mix of (3), (4) and (5)."

Sunstein and Vermeule also analyze the practice of recruiting "nongovernmental officials"; they suggest that "government can supply these independent experts with information and perhaps prod them into action from behind the scenes", further warning that "too close a connection will be self-defeating if it is exposed." Sunstein and Vermeule argue that the practice of enlisting non-government officials, "might ensure that credible independent experts offer the rebuttal, rather than government officials themselves. There is a tradeoff between credibility and control, however. The price of credibility is that government cannot be seen to control the independent experts." This position has been criticized by some commentators who argue that it would violate prohibitions on government propaganda aimed at domestic citizens. Sunstein and Vermeule's proposed infiltrations have also been met by sharply critical scholarly responses.

== Personal life ==
In the 1980s and early 1990s, Sunstein was married to Lisa Ruddick, whom he met when both were undergraduates at Harvard. She was associate professor of English at the University of Chicago, specializing in British modernism, and is now retired. Their marriage ended in divorce. Their daughter Ellyn is a journalist and photographer. Thereafter, Sunstein dated Martha Nussbaum for almost a decade. Nussbaum is a philosopher, classicist, and professor of law at the University of Chicago.

On July 4, 2008, Sunstein married Samantha Power, a diplomat and government official who would serve as United States ambassador to the United Nations, whom he met when they both worked as campaign advisors to Barack Obama. The wedding took place in the Church of Mary Immaculate, in Lohar, Waterville, Ireland. They have two children: a son (born 2009) and a daughter (born 2012).

Sunstein is an avid amateur squash player who has played against professionals in PSA tournaments and in 2017 was ranked 449th in the world by the Professional Squash Association.

== Honors ==
In July 2017, Sunstein was elected a Corresponding Fellow of the British Academy (FBA), the United Kingdom's national academy for the humanities and social sciences.

In 2018 he was awarded the Holberg Prize for having "reshaped our understanding of the relationship between the modern regulatory state and constitutional law. He is widely regarded as the leading scholar of administrative law in the U.S., and he is by far the most cited legal scholar in the United States and probably the world."

In 2026, he was made an Honorary Fellow of Trinity College Dublin.

== Publications ==
=== Books ===
1990–1999

- Sunstein, Cass R. (1990). Feminism and Political Theory. Chicago, Illinois: The University of Chicago Press. ISBN 978-0-226-78008-5.
- Sunstein, Cass R.; Stone, Geoffrey R.; Epstein, Richard A. (1992). The Bill of Rights and the Modern State. Chicago, Illinois: University of Chicago Press. ISBN 978-0-226-77532-6.
- Sunstein, Cass R. (1993). After the Rights Revolution: Reconceiving the Regulatory State. Harvard: Harvard University Press. ISBN 978-0-674-00909-7.
- Sunstein, Cass R. (1993). The Partial Constitution. Harvard: Harvard University Press. ISBN 978-0-674-65478-5.
- Sunstein, Cass R. (1995). Democracy and the problem of free speech. New York: The Free Press. ISBN 978-0-02-874000-3.
- Sunstein, Cass R. (1996). Legal Reasoning and Political Conflict. Oxford: Oxford University Press. ISBN 978-0-19-511804-9.
- Sunstein, Cass R. (1997). Free Markets and Social Justice. Oxford: Oxford University Press. ISBN 978-0-19-510273-4.
- Sunstein, Cass R.; Nussbaum, Martha C. (1999). Clones and Clones: Facts and Fantasies about Human Cloning. New York London: W.W. Norton. ISBN 978-0-393-32001-5.
- Sunstein, Cass R. (1999). One Case at a Time: Judicial Minimalism on the Supreme Court. Harvard: Harvard University Press. ISBN 978-0-674-00579-2.

2000–2009

- Sunstein, Cass R.; Holmes, Stephen (2000). The Cost of Rights: Why Liberty Depends on Taxes. New York London: W. W. Norton. ISBN 978-0-393-04670-0.
- Sunstein, Cass R. (2000). Behavioral Law and Economics. Cambridge: Cambridge University Press. ISBN 978-0-521-66743-2.
- Sunstein, Cass R.; Epstein, Richard A. (2001). The Vote: Bush, Gore & the Supreme Court. Chicago: University of Chicago Press. ISBN 978-0-226-21307-1.
- Sunstein, Cass R. (2001). Designing Democracy: What Constitutions Do. Oxford: Oxford University Press. ISBN 978-0-19-514542-7.
- Sunstein, Cass R. (2001). Republic.com. Princeton: Princeton University Press. ISBN 978-0-691-07025-4.
- Sunstein, Cass R.; Hastie, Reid; Payne, John W.; Schkade, David; Viscusi, W. Kip (2002). Punitive Damages: How Juries Decide. Chicago, Illinois: University of Chicago Press. ISBN 978-0-226-78015-3.
- Sunstein, Cass R. (2002). The Cost-Benefit State: The Future of Regulatory Protection. Chicago, Illinois: American Bar Association. ISBN 978-1-59031-054-0.
- Sunstein, Cass R. (2002). Risk and reason: Safety, law, and the environment. Cambridge: Cambridge University Press. ISBN 978-0-521-01625-4.

Translation: Sunstein, Cass R. (2006). Riesgo y razón. Seguridad, ley y medioambiente (in Spanish). Buenos Aires Madrid: Katz Editores. ISBN 978-84-609-8350-7.

- Sunstein, Cass R. (2003). Why Societies Need Dissent. Harvard: Harvard University Press. ISBN 978-0-674-01268-4.
- Sunstein, Cass R.; Nussbaum, Martha (2004). Animal Rights: Current Debates and New Directions. Oxford New York: Oxford University Press. ISBN 978-0-19-530510-4.
- Sunstein, Cass R. (2005). The Laws of Fear: Beyond the Precautionary Principle. Cambridge: Cambridge University Press. ISBN 978-0-521-61512-9. (based on the Seeley Lectures 2004 at Cambridge University)

Translation: Sunstein, Cass R. (2009). Leyes de miedo: Más allá del principio de precaución (in Spanish). Buenos Aires Madrid: Katz Editores. ISBN 978-84-96859-61-6.

- Sunstein, Cass R. (2005). Radicals in Robes: Why Extreme Right-Wing Courts are Wrong for America. New York: Basic Books. ISBN 978-0-465-08327-5.
- Sunstein, Cass R. (2004). The Second Bill of Rights: Franklin Delano Roosevelt's Unfinished Revolution and Why We Need It More Than Ever. New York: Basic Books. ISBN 978-0-465-08333-6.
- Sunstein, Cass R. (2006). Infotopia: How Many Minds Produce Knowledge. Oxford: Oxford University Press. ISBN 978-0-19-534067-9.
- Sunstein, Cass R.; Schkade, David; Ellman, Lisa; Sawicki, Andres (2006). Are Judges Political? An Empirical Investigation of the Federal Judiciary. Washington, D.C.: Brookings Institution Press. ISBN 978-0-8157-8234-6.
- Sunstein, Cass R. (2007). Republic.com 2.0. Princeton: Princeton University Press. ISBN 978-0-691-13356-0.
- Sunstein, Cass R. (2007). Worst-Case Scenarios. Harvard: Harvard University Press. ISBN 978-0-674-03251-4.
- Sunstein, Cass R.; Thaler, Richard (2008). Nudge: Improving Decisions about Health, Wealth, and Happiness. New Haven, Connecticut: Yale University Press. ISBN 978-0-14-311526-7.

Translation: Un pequeño empujón (in Spanish). Barcelona: Taurus. 2009. ISBN 978-607-31-6206-7.

- Sunstein, Cass R. (2009). Going to Extremes: How Like Minds Unite and Divide. Oxford: Oxford University Press. ISBN 978-0-19-975412-0.
- Sunstein, Cass R. (2009). On Rumors: How Falsehoods Spread, Why We Believe Them, What Can Be Done. Princeton: Princeton University Press. ISBN 978-0-691-16250-8.

2010–2019

- Sunstein, Cass R. (2010). Law and Happiness. Chicago, Illinois: The University of Chicago Press. ISBN 978-0-226-67600-5.
- Sunstein, Cass R.; Breyer, Stephen G.; Stewart, Richard B.; Vermeule, Adrian; Herz, Michael (2011). Administrative Law and Regulatory Policy: Problems, Text, and Cases (7th ed.). New York: Wolters Kluwer Law & Business. ISBN 978-0-7355-8744-1.
- Sunstein, Cass R. (2013). Simpler: The Future of Government. New York: Simon & Schuster. ISBN 978-1-4767-2659-5.
- Sunstein, Cass R.; Stone, Geoffrey R.; Seidman, Louis M.; Tushnet, Mark V.; Karlan, Pamela S. (2013). Constitutional Law (7th ed.). New York: Wolters Kluwer Law & Business. ISBN 978-1-4548-1757-4.
- Sunstein, Cass R. (2014). Valuing Life: Humanizing the Regulatory State. Chicago, Illinois: The University of Chicago Press. ISBN 978-0-226-78017-7.
- Sunstein, Cass R.; Hastie, Reid (2014). Wiser: Getting Beyond Groupthink to Make Groups Smarter. Harvard: Harvard Business Review Press. ISBN 978-1-4221-2299-0.
- Sunstein, Cass R. (2014). Why Nudge?: The Politics of Libertarian Paternalism (The Storrs Lectures Series). Yale University Press. ISBN 978-0-300-19786-0.
- Sunstein, Cass R. (2016). The World According to Star Wars. New York: Dey Street Books. ISBN 978-0-06-248422-2.
- Sunstein, Cass R. (2016). The Ethics of Influence: Government in the Age of Behavioral Science. New York: Cambridge University Press. ISBN 978-1-10-714070-7.
- Sunstein, Cass R. (2017). #Republic : divided democracy in the age of social media. Princeton University Press. ISBN 978-0-691-17551-5. OCLC 958799819.
- Sunstein, Cass R. (2017). Human Agency and Behavioral Economics: Nudging Fast and Slow. Palgrave Advances in Behavioral Economics. ISBN 978-3-319-55806-6. OCLC 1049592088.
- Sunstein, Cass R. (2017). Impeachment: A Citizen's Guide. Harvard University Press. ISBN 978-0-674-98379-3.
- Sunstein, Cass R. (2018). Can It Happen Here?: Authoritarianism in America. HarperCollins. ISBN 978-0-06-269621-2.
- Sunstein, Cass R. (2018). The Cost-Benefit Revolution. MIT Press. ISBN 978-0-262-03814-0.
- Sunstein, Cass R. (2019). On Freedom. Princeton University Press. ISBN 978-0-691-19115-7.
- Sunstein, Cass R. (2019). How Change Happens. MIT Press. ISBN 978-0-262-03957-4.
- Sunstein, Cass R. (2019). Conformity: The Power of Social Influences. NYU Press. ISBN 978-1-4798-6783-7.
- Sunstein, Cass R.; Vermeule, Adrian (2020). Law and Leviathan: Redeeming the Administrative State. Cambridge, MA: Belknap Press.

2020 onwards

- Sunstein, Cass R. (2020). Too Much Information: Understanding What You Don't Want to Know. Cambridge, MA: MIT Press. ISBN 978-0-262044165.
- Sunstein, Cass R. (2021). Averting Catastrophe: Decision Theory for Covid-19, Climate Change, and Potential Disasters of All Kinds. New York University Press. ISBN 9781479808489.
- Kahneman, Daniel; Sibony, Olivier; Sunstein, Cass R. (2021). Noise: A Flaw in Human Judgment. William Collins. ISBN 978-0-00-830899-5.* Sunstein, Cass R. (2021). Sludge: What Stops Us from Getting Things Done and What to Do about It. Cambridge, MA: The MIT Press.
- Sunstein, Cass R. (2021). This Is Not Normal: The Politics of Everyday Expectations. Yale University Press. ISBN 978-0-300-25350-4.
- Sunstein, Cass R. (2021). Liars: Falsehoods and Free Speech in an Age of Deception. Oxford University Press. ISBN 978-0-19-754511-9.
- Sunstein, Cass R.; Dhami, Sanjit (2022). Bounded Rationality: Heuristics, Judgment, and Public Policy. MIT Press. ISBN 978-0-26-254370-5.
- Sunstein, Cass R. (2023). How to Interpret the Constitution. Princeton University Press. ISBN 978-0-691-25204-9.
- Sunstein, Cass R. (2023). Decisions about Decisions: Practical Reason in Ordinary Life. Cambridge: Cambridge University Press.
- Sunstein, Cass R. (2024). How to Become Famous: Lost Einsteins, Forgotten Superstars, and How the Beatles Came to Be. Cambridge, MA: Harvard Business Review Press.
- Sharot, Tali; Sunstein, Cass R. (2024). Look Again: The Power of Noticing What Was Always There. Atria/One Signal. ISBN 978-1-6680-0820-1.
- Sunstein, Cass R. (2024). Campus Free Speech: A Pocket Guide. Cambridge, MA: Harvard University Press.
- Sunstein, Cass R. (2024). Climate Justice: What Rich Nations Owe the World–And the Future. Cambridge, MA: MIT Press.
- Sunstein, Cass R.; Bar-Gill, Oren (2025). Algorithmic Harm: Protecting People in the Age of Artificial Intelligence. Oxford University Press. ISBN 978-0-19-777820-3.
- Sunstein, Cass R. (2025). Manipulation: What It Is, Why It's Bad, What to Do About It. Cambridge: Cambridge University Press. ISBN 978-1-00-962021-5.
- Sunstein, Cass R. (2026). Separation of Powers: How to Preserve Liberty in Troubled Times. Cambridge, MA: MIT Press. ISBN 978-0-262-05177-4.
- Sunstein, Cass R. (2026). On Liberalism: In Defense of Freedom. Cambridge, MA: MIT Press. ISBN 978-0-262-05731-8.
- Sunstein, Cass R.; Ollman-Margalit, Edna (2026). Decisions and Social Norms. Edward Elgar Publishing. ISBN 978-1-049-42245-9.
- Sunstein, Cass R. (2027). Animals Matter: The Case for a Kinder World. Princeton Universit Press. ISBN 978-0-691-28903-8.
- Sunstein, Cass R. (2026). The Price of Happiness: Behavioral Economics and Willingness to Pay. Cambridge University Press. ISBN 97810088436321.

=== Selected articles ===
- Sunstein, Cass R. (1984). "Naked Preferences and the Constitution". Columbia Law Review. 84 (7): 1689–1732. JSTOR 1122446.
- — (1985). "Interest Groups in American Public Law". Stanford Law Review. 38 (1): 29–88. JSTOR 1228602.
- — (1987). "Lochner's Legacy". Columbia Law Review. 87 (5): 873–919. JSTOR 1122721.
- — (1987). "Constitutionalism After the New Deal". Harvard Law Review. 101 (2): 421–510. JSTOR 1341264.
- — (1988). "Beyond the Republican Revival". Yale Law Journal. 97 (8): 1539–90. JSTOR 796540.
- — (1989). "Interpreting Statutes in the Regulatory State". Harvard Law Review. 103 (2): 405–508. JSTOR 1341272.
- — (1990). "Law and Administration After Chevron". Columbia Law Review. 90 (8): 2071–2120. JSTOR 1122889.
- — (1992). "What's Standing After Lujan—Of Citizen Suits, Injuries, and Article III". Michigan Law Review. 91 (2): 163–236. JSTOR 1289685.
- —; Lessig, Lawrence (1994). "The President and the Administration". Columbia Law Review. 94 (1): 1–123. JSTOR 1123119.
- — (1995). "Problems with Rules". California Law Review. 83 (4): 953–1026. JSTOR 3480896.
- — (1996). "The Supreme Court, 1995 Term — Foreword: Leaving Things Undecided". Harvard Law Review. 110 (1): 4–101. JSTOR 1342006.
- — (1996). "On the Expressive Function of Law". University of Pennsylvania Law Review. 144 (5): 2021–54. JSTOR 3312647. Archived from the original on October 8, 2014.
- — (1996). "Social Norms and Social Roles". Columbia Law Review. 96 (4): 903–68. JSTOR 1123430.
- —; Jolls, Christine; Thaler, Richard (1998). "A Behavioral Approach to Law and Economics". Stanford Law Review. 50 (5): 1471–1550. JSTOR 2381432.
- — (2000). "Nondelegation Canons". University of Chicago Law Review. 67 (2): 315–44. JSTOR 1600490.
- —; Thaler, Richard (2003). "Libertarian Paternalism Is Not an Oxymoron". University of Chicago Law Review. 70 (4): 1159–1202. JSTOR 1600573.
- — (2006). "Chevron Step Zero". Virginia Law Review. 92 (2): 187–250. JSTOR 4144979.
- — (2013). "The Office of Information and Regulatory Affairs: Myths and Realities". Harvard Law Review. 126 (7): 1838–79. JSTOR 23415059.
- —; Vermeule, Adrian (2018). "The Morality of Administrative Law". Harvard Law Review. 131 (7): 1924–78. JSTOR 44865917.

== See also ==
- Barack Obama Supreme Court candidates
- Choice architecture
- List of animal rights advocates
- List of law clerks for the tenth seat of the Supreme Court of the United States
- List of U.S. executive branch 'czars'

Political offices
Preceded by Kevin Neyland; Acting	Administrator of the Office of Information and Regulatory Affairs; 2009–2012	Succeeded by Boris Bershteyn; Acting
