= Neil Gorsuch Supreme Court nomination =

United States Supreme Court nomination

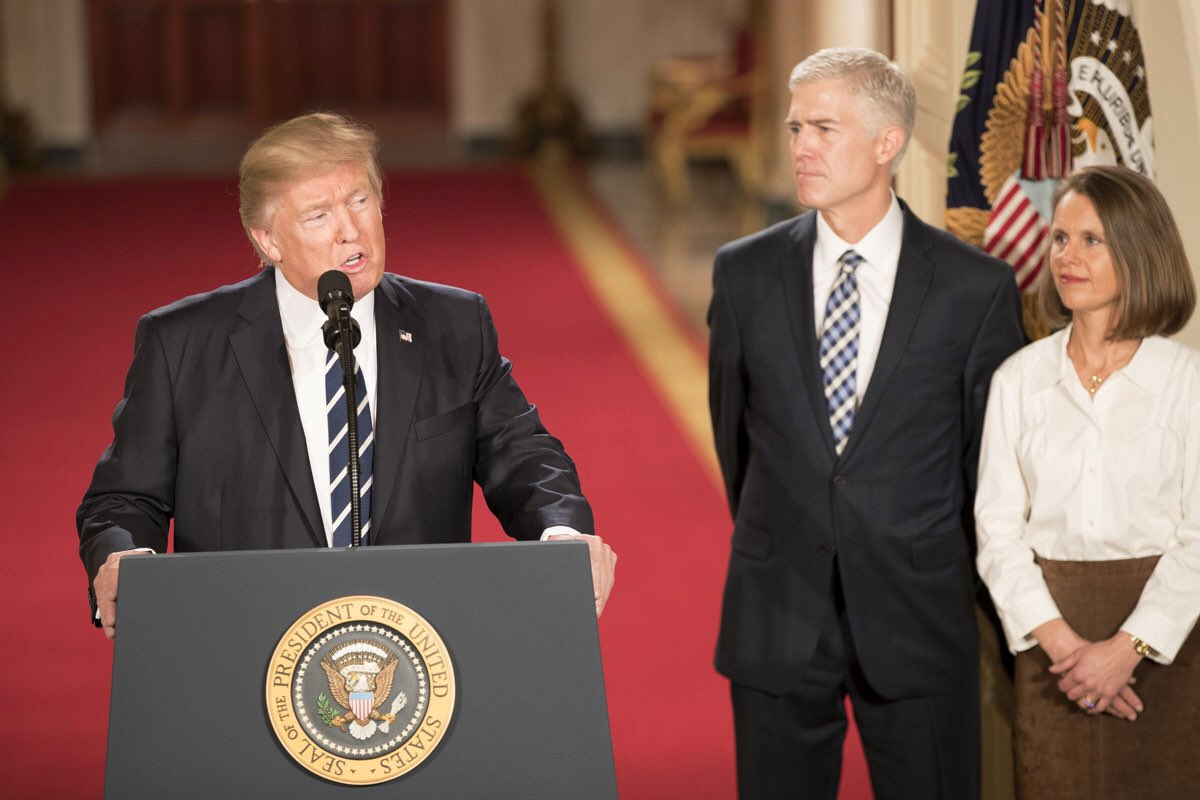
- President Trump announcing the nomination, accompanied by Gorsuch and his wife, Louise
- Nominee: Neil Gorsuch
- Nominated by: Donald Trump (president of the United States)
- Succeeding: Antonin Scalia (associate justice)
- Date nominated: January 31, 2017
- Date confirmed: April 7, 2017
- Outcome: Approved by the U.S. Senate

Vote of the Senate Judiciary Committee
- Votes in favor: 11
- Votes against: 9
- Result: Reported favorably

Senate cloture votes
- Votes in favor: 55
- Votes against: 45
- Result: First cloture motion failed, but the second cloture motion succeeded due to the passage of the "nuclear option”

Senate confirmation vote
- Votes in favor: 54
- Votes against: 45
- Result: Confirmed

On January 31, 2017, soon after taking office, Republican President Donald Trump nominated Neil Gorsuch for Associate Justice of the Supreme Court of the United States to succeed Antonin Scalia, who had died almost one year earlier. When nominated, Gorsuch was a sitting judge on the United States Court of Appeals for the Tenth Circuit, a position to which he had been appointed by President George W. Bush in 2006. President Barack Obama, a Democrat, had nominated Merrick Garland, Chief Judge of the United States Court of Appeals for the District of Columbia Circuit, to succeed Scalia on March 16, 2016, but the Republican-controlled U.S. Senate did not vote on the nomination. Republican majority leader Mitch McConnell argued that, as the presidential election cycle had already commenced, the appointment of the next justice had become a political issue to be decided by voters. The Senate Judiciary Committee therefore refused to consider Garland's nomination, keeping the vacancy open through the end of Obama's presidency on January 20, 2017.

Democratic Senators launched a filibuster against Gorsuch's nomination to block his confirmation. However, Republicans invoked the "nuclear option", eliminating the filibuster with respect to Supreme Court nominees. The Senate ultimately confirmed Gorsuch's nomination to the Supreme Court by a 54–45 vote on April 7, 2017 (all Republicans and three Democrats voted in his favor). Ten days after his confirmation, Gorsuch heard his first case as the 101st associate justice of the Court, in Anthony Perry vs. Merit Systems Protection Board.

== Background ==
On February 13, 2016, Associate Justice of the Supreme Court Antonin Scalia died unexpectedly. His death triggered a protracted political battle that did not end until the Senate confirmed Gorsuch's nomination in April 2017.

Political commentators at the time widely recognized Scalia as one of the most conservative members of the Court, and noted that then-President Barack Obama had an opportunity to name a more liberal replacement, a move that could alter the Court's ideological balance for many years to come. Obama ultimately nominated centrist United States Court of Appeals for the District of Columbia Circuit Chief Judge Merrick Garland on March 16, 2016. His confirmation would have given Democratic appointees a majority on the Supreme Court for the first time since the 1970s. However, the Senate had had a Republican majority since 2015, so Garland could only be confirmed by a bipartisan majority.

However, Republican Senate leaders declared that the Senate would not even consider a nomination from the president, citing the fact that the vacancy arose during Obama's final year as president. This was the first time in 150 years that the Senate had refused to hold a confirmation vote on a Senate nominee.

Garland's nomination therefore expired on January 3, 2017 with the end of the 114th Congress, 293 days after it had been submitted to the Senate. As a result of the nomination's defeat, Scalia's seat remained vacant until after Donald Trump's January 20, 2017 presidential inauguration. This was only the 15th time in U.S. Senate history that a Supreme Court nomination had lapsed at the end of a session of Congress. Many Democrats reacted angrily to the Senate's refusal to consider Garland, with Senator Jeff Merkley describing the vacant seat as a "stolen seat". However, Republicans like Senator Chuck Grassley argued that the Senate was within its rights to refuse to consider a nominee until the inauguration of a new president.

== Nomination ==
=== Potential candidates ===
During the 2016 presidential campaign, while Garland remained before the Senate, Trump released two lists of potential nominees. On May 18, 2016, Trump released a short list of eleven judges for nomination to the Scalia vacancy. In September 2016, Trump released a second list of ten possible nominees, this time including three minorities.

Both lists were assembled by the Federalist Society and The Heritage Foundation. Leonard Leo of the Federalist Society played a major role in the creation of the second list, which included Gorsuch. The Trump administration also considered nominating Brett Kavanaugh and Amy Coney Barrett to the seat, who were later nominated and confirmed after the retirement of Anthony Kennedy in 2018 and the death of Ruth Bader Ginsburg in 2020, respectively.

After winning the presidential election, Trump and White House Counsel Don McGahn interviewed four individuals for the Supreme Court opening, all of whom had appeared on one of the two previously released lists. The four individuals were federal appellate judges Tom Hardiman, Bill Pryor and Neil Gorsuch, as well as federal district judge Amul Thapar, all appointed to the federal bench by President George W. Bush. While Pryor had been seen by many as the early front-runner due to the backing of Attorney General Jeff Sessions, many evangelicals expressed resistance to him, and the final decision ultimately came down to Gorsuch or Hardiman. Hardiman had the support of Trump's sister, Judge Maryanne Trump Barry, but Trump instead chose to nominate Gorsuch.

=== Announcement ===
President Trump announced the nomination of Gorsuch on January 31, 2017. The nomination was formally received by the Senate on February 1, 2017, and was subsequently referred to the Senate Judiciary Committee. At the time of his nomination, Gorsuch was described as solidly conservative, but likely to be confirmed without much difficulty. Richard Primus of Politico described Gorsuch as "Scalia 2.0" due to ideological similarities, and a report prepared by Lee Epstein, Andrew Martin, and Kevin Quinn predicted that Gorsuch would be a "reliable conservative" similar to Scalia.

According to The Washington Post, Trump considered rescinding Gorsuch's nomination, venting angrily to advisers after Gorsuch was critical of his escalating attacks on the federal judiciary in a private February meeting with Democratic legislators.

== Responses to the nomination ==
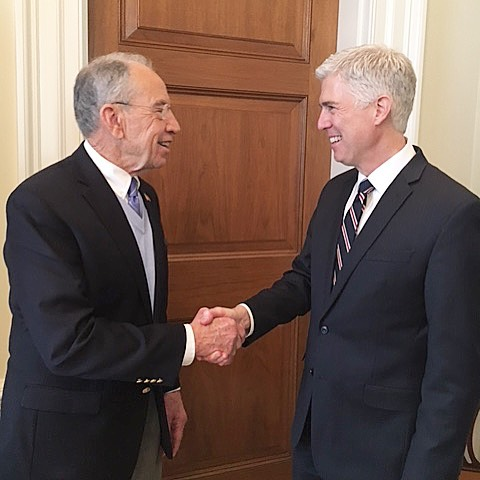
Neil Gorsuch with Senate Judiciary Committee Chairman Chuck Grassley, February 1, 2017

Norm Eisen, Special Counsel for Ethics and Government Reform in the White House and Ambassador to the Czech Republic, endorsed Gorsuch. Eisen was a classmate of both Gorsuch and Obama at Harvard Law. Neal Katyal, who served as Acting Solicitor General of the United States during the Obama Administration and law professor at Georgetown University Law Center, endorsed Gorsuch for approval to the Supreme Court and introduced him on the first day of the hearings.

The National Rifle Association, the National Shooting Sports Foundation, the Second Amendment Foundation, and other gun rights groups endorsed Gorsuch, while Americans for Responsible Solutions, the Law Center to Prevent Gun Violence, and other gun control proponents opposed his nomination. House Minority Leader Nancy Pelosi claimed Gorsuch "comes down on the side of felons over gun safety". PolitiFact called her statement misleading and said that Gorsuch's past rulings do not "demonstrate that he thinks more felons should be allowed guns than what is already permitted under the law".

The American Civil Liberties Union raised concerns about Gorsuch's respect for disability rights. The Secular Coalition for America, Freedom from Religion Foundation, and Union for Reform Judaism all voiced concerns with Gorsuch's nomination.

The Judicial Crisis Network enthusiastically rallied behind Gorsuch after running a campaign against Merrick Garland, spending a total of $17 million to these ends.

== Judiciary Committee review ==
=== Confirmation hearings ===
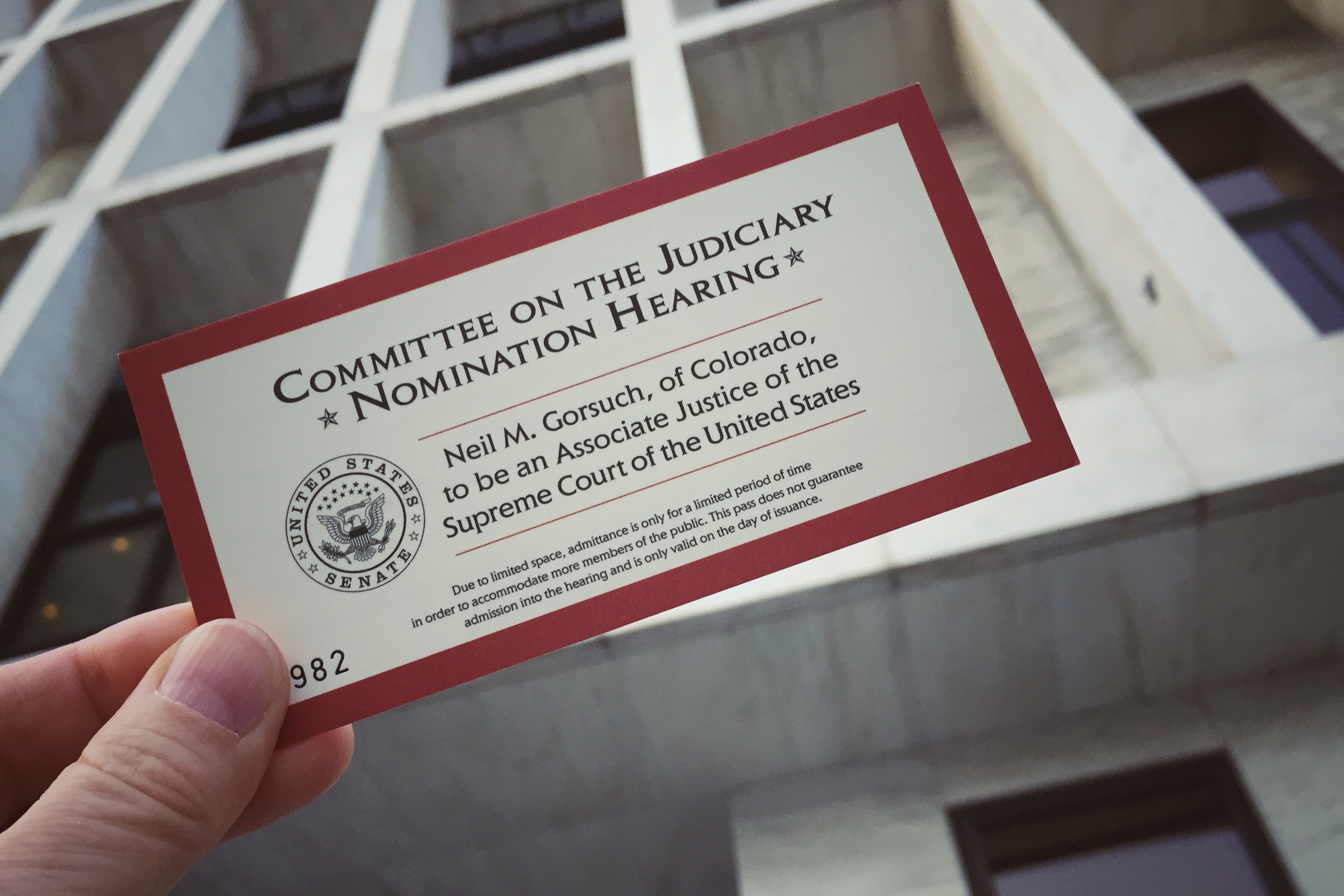
Ticket for the March 2017 Neil Gorsuch Supreme Court nomination hearing before the Senate Judiciary Committee

Gorsuch's nomination was first considered by the Senate Judiciary Committee, which holds hearings on all federal judicial nominations and decides whether or not to send nominations to the full Senate for a final confirmation vote. In the 115th Congress, the committee consisted of 11 Republicans and 9 Democrats and was led by Republican Chuck Grassley. In preparation for the hearing, the committee requested that the Department of Justice (DOJ) send all documents they had regarding Gorsuch's work in the George W. Bush administration. By the time the hearings commenced, the DOJ had sent the committee over 144,000 pages of documents and, according to a White House spokesman, more than 220,000 pages of documents altogether. Gorsuch's confirmation hearing started on March 20, 2017, and lasted four days.

On the first day of hearings, March 20, senators largely used their opening statements to criticize each other, with Ranking Democrat Dianne Feinstein complaining of the "unprecedented treatment" of Judge Merrick Garland, Democrat Michael Bennet arguing that "two wrongs don't make a right", and Republican Ted Cruz insisting that President Trump's nomination now carried "super-legitimacy". Democratic senators repeatedly criticized Gorsuch for his dissent in Transam Trucking v. Administrative Review Bd., colloquially referred to as the "frozen trucker case", where the Tenth Circuit Court of Appeals had ruled in favor of a truck driver who, after waiting hours for relief, had finally abandoned his unheated truck and trailer in dangerously inclement conditions. Democrat Dick Durbin told Gorsuch that the cold weather described in the facts of the case was "not as cold as your dissent". Durbin also criticized the accuracy of Gorsuch's opinion in Burwell v. Hobby Lobby, where Gorsuch had contended that contraception "destroys a fertilized egg," and that he had held that the Religious Freedom Restoration Act included protection for corporations rather than just individuals. In his 16-minute opening statement, Gorsuch repeated his belief that a judge who likes all his rulings is "probably a pretty bad judge." He argued that his decisions were based on "the facts at issue in each particular case." He also noted that his extensive record included many examples where he ruled both for and against disadvantaged groups.

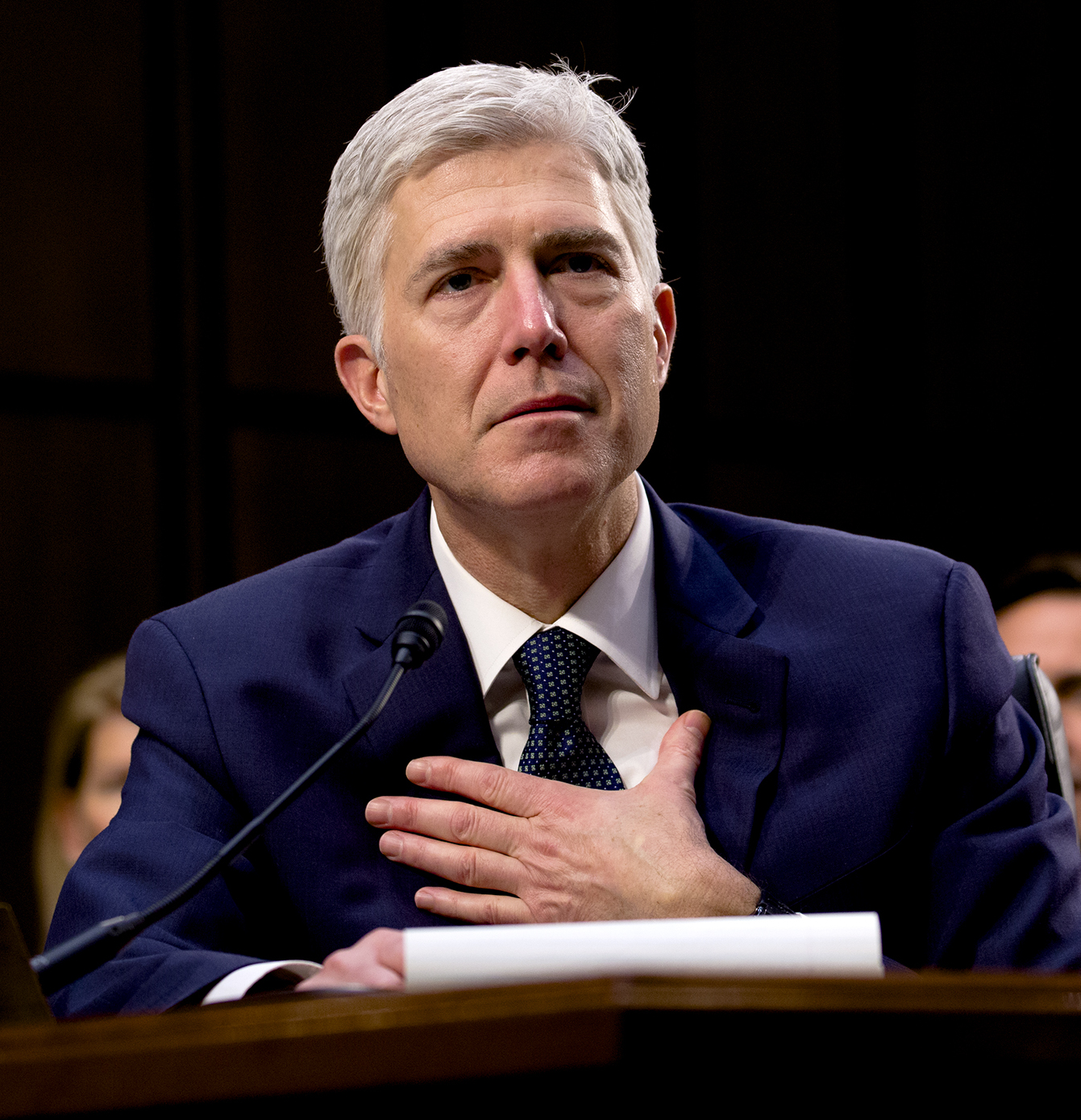
Judge Gorsuch testifying before the Senate Judiciary Committee, March 22, 2017

On the second day of hearings, March 21, Gorsuch responded to questions by committee members. When Chairman Chuck Grassley asked Gorsuch if he would "have any trouble ruling against the president who appointed you", Gorsuch replied, no, and "that's a softball". Ted Cruz used his time to ask Gorsuch about The Hitchhiker's Guide to the Galaxy, basketball, and mutton busting. When asked by Republican Lindsey Graham how he would have reacted if during his interview at Trump Tower President Trump had asked him to vote against Roe v. Wade, Gorsuch replied "I would have walked out the door". Democratic senators continued to criticize Gorsuch regarding his dissent in Transam Trucking, with Dianne Feinstein asking him whether he would "be for the little men" and Democrat Al Franken telling him the facts of the case constituted an "absurdity exception" to the plain meaning rule, which Gorsuch had relied upon in his dissent. Franken went on to say "I had a career in identifying absurdity", referring to his former career as a comedian. Democrat Patrick Leahy criticized Republicans' obstructions of the Garland nomination, disparage President George W. Bush policies that Gorsuch had defended at the Justice Department, and to ask Gorsuch how he would rule in Washington v. Trump, a then-pending case concerning the legality of Trump's Executive Order 13769, colloquially referred to as the "Muslim ban." Gorsuch refused to comment on active litigation and explained that lawyers must defend their clients, while characterizing Garland as someone he admires, "an outstanding judge", and stating that he always read Garland's opinions with "special care".

On the third day of hearings, Gorsuch continued to answer committee members' questions. Republican Orrin Hatch asked Gorsuch if he thought his writings reflected "a knee-jerk attitude against common-sense regulations", to which the judge replied "no". Democrat Sheldon Whitehouse spent the bulk of his allotted time describing to Gorsuch the negative effects of "dark money" contributed by unknown donors. He also warned that the Court's 2010 Citizens United ruling's elimination of limits for political spending by corporations in elections could result in undue corporate political influence and asked Gorsuch if he would be subject to "capture" by big business, to which Gorsuch replied "nobody will capture me". Democrat Amy Klobuchar pressed Gorsuch on what she viewed as his "selective originalism," observing that Gorsuch, who self-identifies as an originalist, had not consistently interpreted legal texts, including the Constitution, by the original public meaning that they would have had at the time that they became law. Later, when Dianne Feinstein asked him a question on the Equal Protection Clause and tensions between originalism and the later expansion of constitutional protections for women and racial minorities after its original drafting, Gorsuch stated that originalism did not seek "to return us to horse and buggy days" and that "it matters not a whit that some of the drafters of the Fourteenth Amendment were racists. Because they were. Or sexists, because they were. The law they drafted promises equal protection of the laws to all persons. That's what they wrote."

That same day, the Supreme Court unanimously reversed the Tenth Circuit in an Individuals with Disabilities Education Act case Gorsuch had not been involved in, although in 2008 he had written for a unanimous panel applying the same circuit precedent. Still, Senate Minority Leader Charles Schumer said this demonstrated "a continued, troubling pattern of Judge Gorsuch deciding against everyday Americans, even children who require special assistance at school".

Gorsuch confirmation hearing witnesses
Date	Name	Role
March 20	Michael Bennet, Senator (D-CO)	Introducer
March 20	Cory Gardner, Senator (R-CO)	Introducer
March 20	Neal Katyal, former acting U.S. Solicitor General (May 2010 – June 2011)	Introducer
March 20 through March 22	Neil Gorsuch	Nominee
March 23	Nancy Scott Degan, Chair, American Bar Association Standing Committee on the Federal Judiciary	Congressional witness
March 23	Shannon Edwards, Member, American Bar Association Standing Committee on the Federal Judiciary	Congressional witness
March 23	Deanell Reece Tacha, Pepperdine University School of Law Duane And Kelly Roberts Dean And Professor Of Law, U.S. Court Of Appeals Judge (Retired)	Republican witness
March 23	Robert Harlan Henry, President of Oklahoma City University, U.S. Court Of Appeals Judge (Retired)	Republican witness
March 23	John L. Kane Jr., United States federal judge, United States District Court for the District of Colorado	Republican witness
March 23	Leah Bressack, former law clerk	Republican witness
March 23	Elisa Massimino, President and CEO, Human Rights First	Democratic witness
March 23	Jameel Jaffer, Executive Director, Columbia University/Knight First Amendment Institute	Democratic witness
March 23	Jeff Perkins	Democratic witness
March 23	Guerino J. Calemine, III, General Counsel, Communication Workers of America	Democratic witness
March 23	Jeff Lamken, Partner, MoloLamken	Republican witness
March 23	Lawrence Solum, Carmack Waterhouse Professor Of Law, Georgetown University Law Center	Republican witness
March 23	Jonathan Turley, J.B. And Maurice C. Shapiro Professor Of Public Interest Law, The George Washington University Law School	Republican witness
March 23	Karen Harned, Executive Director, National Federation Of Independent Business Small Business Legal Center	Republican witness
March 23	Heather McGhee, President, Demos	Democratic witness
March 23	Fatima Goss Graves, Senior Vice President For Program & President-Elect, National Women's Law Center	Democratic witness
March 23	Patrick Gallagher, Director, Sierra Club Environmental Law Program	Democratic witness
March 23	Eve Hill, Partner, Brown Goldstein Levy	Democratic witness
March 23	Peter Kirsanow, Commissioner, U.S. Commission On Civil Rights; Partner, Benesch, Friedlander, Coplan & Aronoff	Republican witness
March 23	Alice Fisher, Partner, Latham & Watkins	Republican witness
March 23	Hannah Smith, Senior Counsel, Becket Fund	Republican witness
March 23	Timothy Meyer, former law clerk	Republican witness
March 23	Jamil N. Jaffer, former law clerk	Republican witness
March 23	Kristen Clarke, President & CEO, Lawyers Committee For Civil Rights Under Law	Democratic witness
March 23	Sarah Warbelow, Legal Director, Human Rights Campaign	Democratic witness
March 23	Amy Hagstrom Miller, President, CEO, & Founder, Whole Woman's Health	Democratic witness
March 23	William Marshall, William Rand Kenan Jr. Distinguished Professor Of Law, University Of North Carolina	Democratic witness
March 23	Sandy Phillips	Democratic witness

=== Plagiarism allegations ===
On April 4, BuzzFeed and Politico ran articles highlighting similar language occurring in Gorsuch's book The Future of Assisted Suicide and Euthanasia and an earlier law review article by Abigail Lawlis Kuzma, Indiana's deputy attorney general. Academic experts contacted by Politico "differed in their assessment of what Gorsuch did, ranging from calling it a clear impropriety to mere sloppiness".

John Finnis, who had supervised Gorsuch's dissertation at Oxford, stated, "the allegation is entirely without foundation. The book is meticulous in its citation of primary sources. The allegation that the book is guilty of plagiarism because it does not cite secondary sources which draw on those same primary sources is, frankly, absurd." Kuzma stated, "I have reviewed both passages and do not see an issue here, even though the language is similar. These passages are factual, not analytical in nature, framing both the technical legal and medical circumstances of the 'Baby/Infant Doe' case that occurred in 1982." Noah Feldman, a Harvard Law professor, argued that Gorsuch had committed "minor plagiarism" that deserved "no more punishment than the embarrassment attendant on its revelation".

=== Committee vote ===
On April 3, 2017, the Senate Judiciary Committee endorsed the Gorsuch nomination, sending it to the full Senate for final action by an 11–9 party-line vote, with all Republican members voting for him and all Democratic members voting against. The last time the committee's vote to approve a Supreme Court nominee split precisely along party lines was in 2006 on the Samuel Alito nomination.

== Filibuster and cloture vote ==
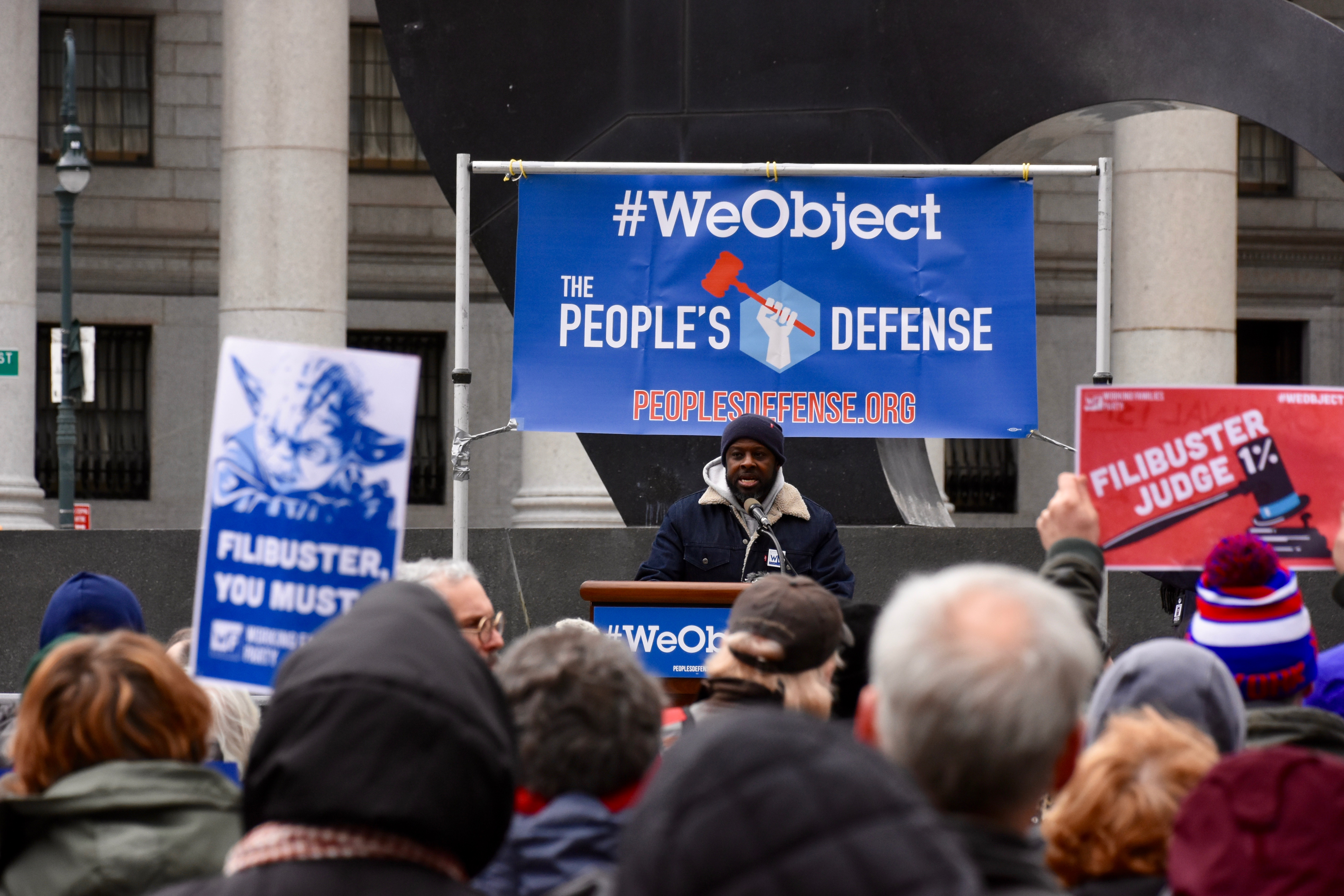
Protesters at Foley Square in Lower Manhattan, New York City urged Senate Democrats to filibuster the Neil Gorsuch nomination, April 1, 2017

Gorsuch needed to win a simple majority vote of the full Senate (51 votes) to be confirmed; however, a filibuster by the opposition would add an additional requirement, a three-fifths supermajority vote in favor of cloture (60 votes), which would allow debate to end and force a final vote on confirmation. At the time, Republicans held 52 seats in the 100-seat Senate, and could also count on (if needed) the tie-breaking vote of Vice President Pence, acting in his Constitutional capacity as President of the Senate. After nominating Gorsuch, President Trump called on the Senate to use the "nuclear option" and abolish the filibuster for Supreme Court appointments if its continued existence would prevent Gorsuch's confirmation. The nuclear option was used in 2013 by then-Majority Leader Harry Reid to abolish filibusters for all presidential appointments except nominations to the Supreme Court.

While some Republicans such as John McCain expressed reluctance about abolishing the filibuster for executive appointments, others such as John Cornyn argued that the Republican majority should reserve all options necessary to confirm Gorsuch.

During the last day of committee hearings, Senate Minority Leader Chuck Schumer announced that he would filibuster the nomination. Democratic opposition focused on complaints saying that Scalia's seat should have been filled by President Obama, rather than on Gorsuch himself. In addition, Democrats Al Franken, Elizabeth Warren, and Kamala Harris, along with Independent Bernie Sanders each criticized various aspects of Gorsuch's record. Additionally, Jeff Merkley said he would do "anything in his power"—including the power of filibustering—to oppose Gorsuch's nomination.

On April 6, 2017, Democrats launched a filibuster against Gorsuch's nomination. Republicans could not reach a supermajority (60 votes) needed for cloture. In response, they invoked the nuclear option and changed the Senate rules to end filibusters for Supreme Court nominees. After the rules change, a second cloture vote was held; this one, needing only a simple majority of Senators voting, passed, bringing debate to a close.

== Full Senate vote ==
The swearing-in ceremony of Gorsuch on April 10, 2017, attended by President Donald Trump and associate Justice Anthony Kennedy, whom Gorsuch formerly clerked for

The Senate confirmed Neil Gorsuch to be an associate justice of the Supreme Court on April 7, 2017, by a vote of 54–45. All Republicans present, along with Democrats Joe Manchin, Heidi Heitkamp and Joe Donnelly, voted to confirm him. Republican Johnny Isakson, who had supported the nomination, was absent for the vote because he was recovering from back surgery.

Vote to confirm the Gorsuch nomination
April 7, 2017	Party			Total votes
April 7, 2017	Democratic	Republican	Independent	Total votes
Yea	3	51	0	54 (54.55%)
Nay	43	0	2	45 (45.45%)
Result: Confirmed
Roll call vote on the nomination: Senator / Party / State / Vote; Lamar Alexander / R / Tennessee / Yea; Tammy Baldwin / D / Wisconsin / Nay; John Barrasso / R / Wyoming / Yea; Michael Bennet / D / Colorado / Nay; Richard Blumenthal / D / Connecticut / Nay; Roy Blunt / R / Missouri / Yea; Cory Booker / D / New Jersey / Nay; John Boozman / R / Arkansas / Yea; Sherrod Brown / D / Ohio / Nay; Richard Burr / R / North Carolina / Yea; Maria Cantwell / D / Washington / Nay; Shelley Moore Capito / R / West Virginia / Yea; Ben Cardin / D / Maryland / Nay; Tom Carper / D / Delaware / Nay; Bob Casey Jr. / D / Pennsylvania / Nay; Bill Cassidy / R / Louisiana / Yea; Thad Cochran / R / Mississippi / Yea; Susan Collins / R / Maine / Yea; Chris Coons / D / Delaware / Nay; Bob Corker / R / Tennessee / Yea; John Cornyn / R / Texas / Yea; Catherine Cortez Masto / D / Nevada / Nay; Tom Cotton / R / Arkansas / Yea; Mike Crapo / R / Idaho / Yea; Ted Cruz / R / Texas / Yea; Steve Daines / R / Montana / Yea; Joe Donnelly / D / Indiana / Yea; Tammy Duckworth / D / Illinois / Nay; Dick Durbin / D / Illinois / Nay; Mike Enzi / R / Wyoming / Yea; Joni Ernst / R / Iowa / Yea; Dianne Feinstein / D / California / Nay; Deb Fischer / R / Nebraska / Yea; Jeff Flake / R / Arizona / Yea; Al Franken / D / Minnesota / Nay; Cory Gardner / R / Colorado / Yea; Kirsten Gillibrand / D / New York / Nay; Lindsey Graham / R / South Carolina / Yea; Chuck Grassley / R / Iowa / Yea; Kamala Harris / D / California / Nay; Maggie Hassan / D / New Hampshire / Nay; Orrin Hatch / R / Utah / Yea; Martin Heinrich / D / New Mexico / Nay; Heidi Heitkamp / D / North Dakota / Yea; Dean Heller / R / Nevada / Yea; Mazie Hirono / D / Hawaii / Nay; John Hoeven / R / North Dakota / Yea; Jim Inhofe / R / Oklahoma / Yea; Johnny Isakson / R / Georgia / Absent; Ron Johnson / R / Wisconsin / Yea; Tim Kaine / D / Virginia / Nay; John Neely Kennedy / R / Louisiana / Yea; Angus King / I / Maine / Nay; Amy Klobuchar / D / Minnesota / Nay; James Lankford / R / Oklahoma / Yea; Patrick Leahy / D / Vermont / Nay; Mike Lee / R / Utah / Yea; Joe Manchin / D / West Virginia / Yea; Ed Markey / D / Massachusetts / Nay; John McCain / R / Arizona / Yea; Claire McCaskill / D / Missouri / Nay; Mitch McConnell / R / Kentucky / Yea; Bob Menendez / D / New Jersey / Nay; Jeff Merkley / D / Oregon / Nay; Jerry Moran / R / Kansas / Yea; Lisa Murkowski / R / Alaska / Yea; Chris Murphy / D / Connecticut / Nay; Patty Murray / D / Washington / Nay; Bill Nelson / D / Florida / Nay; Rand Paul / R / Kentucky / Yea; David Perdue / R / Georgia / Yea; Gary Peters / D / Michigan / Nay; Rob Portman / R / Ohio / Yea; Jack Reed / D / Rhode Island / Nay; Jim Risch / R / Idaho / Yea; Pat Roberts / R / Kansas / Yea; Mike Rounds / R / South Dakota / Yea; Marco Rubio / R / Florida / Yea; Bernie Sanders / I / Vermont / Nay; Ben Sasse / R / Nebraska / Yea; Brian Schatz / D / Hawaii / Nay; Chuck Schumer / D / New York / Nay; Tim Scott / R / South Carolina / Yea; Jeanne Shaheen / D / New Hampshire / Nay; Richard Shelby / R / Alabama / Yea; Debbie Stabenow / D / Michigan / Nay; Luther Strange / R / Alabama / Yea; Dan Sullivan / R / Alaska / Yea; Jon Tester / D / Montana / Nay; John Thune / R / South Dakota / Yea; Thom Tillis / R / North Carolina / Yea; Pat Toomey / R / Pennsylvania / Yea; Tom Udall / D / New Mexico / Nay; Chris Van Hollen / D / Maryland / Nay; Mark Warner / D / Virginia / Nay; Elizabeth Warren / D / Massachusetts / Nay; Sheldon Whitehouse / D / Rhode Island / Nay; Roger Wicker / R / Mississippi / Yea; Ron Wyden / D / Oregon / Nay; Todd Young / R / Indiana / Yea; Source:

On April 10, Gorsuch took the prescribed constitutional and judicial (set by federal law) oaths of office, and became the 113th member of the Supreme Court. At age 49, he was the youngest person to join the Court since Clarence Thomas, at age 43, in 1991. Also, having been a law clerk for Anthony Kennedy (1993–94), he became the first Supreme Court justice to serve alongside a justice for whom he had previously clerked.

== See also ==
- Demographics of the Supreme Court of the United States
- Donald Trump Supreme Court candidates
- First 100 days of Donald Trump's presidency
- List of nominations to the Supreme Court of the United States
