= Neil Gorsuch =

US Supreme Court justice since 2017

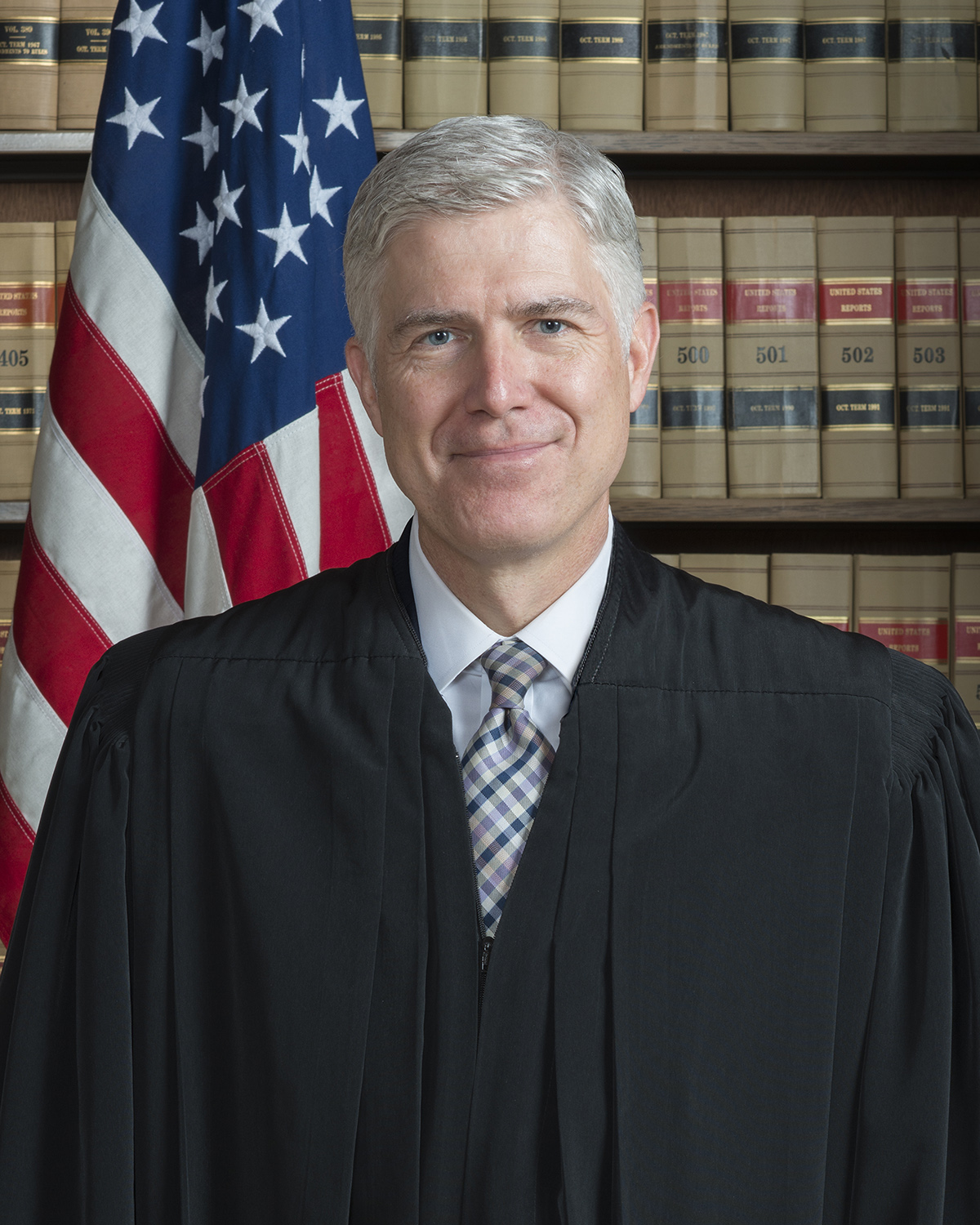
- Official portrait, 2017

Associate Justice of the Supreme Court of the United States
- Incumbent
- Assumed office April 10, 2017
- Appointed by: Donald Trump
- Preceded by: Antonin Scalia

Judge of the United States Court of Appeals for the Tenth Circuit
- In office August 8, 2006 – April 9, 2017
- Appointed by: George W. Bush
- Preceded by: David M. Ebel
- Succeeded by: Allison H. Eid

Personal details
- Born: Neil McGill Gorsuch; August 29, 1967 (age 59) Denver, Colorado, U.S.
- Spouse: Louise Burleston (m. 1996)
- Children: 2
- Parent: Anne Gorsuch Burford
- Education: Columbia University (BA); Harvard University (JD); University College, Oxford (DPhil)

Academic background
- Thesis: The Right to Receive Assistance in Suicide and Euthanasia (2004)
- Doctoral advisor: John Finnis
- Other advisor: Timothy Endicott

Academic work
- Discipline: Legal philosophy
- Notable works: The Future of Assisted Suicide and Euthanasia (2006)
- Gorsuch's voice Gorsuch delivering the decision for National Pork Producers Council v. Ross; Recorded May 11, 2023

Neil McGill Gorsuch (/ˈɡɔːrsʌtʃ/ GOR-sutch; born August 29, 1967) is an American jurist who serves as an associate justice of the Supreme Court of the United States. He was nominated by President Donald Trump on January 31, 2017, and has served since April 10, 2017.

Gorsuch spent his early life in Denver, Colorado. After graduating from Columbia University and Harvard Law School, he earned a doctorate in jurisprudence from the University of Oxford in 2004 as a Marshall Scholar. His doctoral thesis concerned the morality of assisted suicide and was written under the supervision of legal philosopher John Finnis. He was a law clerk for Judge David B. Sentelle, Justice Byron White, and Justice Anthony Kennedy.

From 1995 to 2005, Gorsuch was in private practice with the law firm of Kellogg, Hansen, Todd, Figel & Frederick. He was the principal deputy associate attorney general at the United States Department of Justice from 2005 until his appointment to the Tenth Circuit. President George W. Bush nominated Gorsuch to the United States Court of Appeals for the Tenth Circuit on May 10, 2006, to replace Judge David M. Ebel, who achieved senior status that same year.

Gorsuch is a proponent of textualism in statutory interpretation and originalism in interpreting the United States Constitution. Along with Justice Clarence Thomas, he is an advocate of natural law jurisprudence. He is the first Supreme Court justice to serve alongside a justice for whom he once clerked (Kennedy). During his tenure on the Supreme Court he has written the majority opinion in landmark cases such as Bostock v. Clayton County on LGBT rights, McGirt v. Oklahoma on Indian law, Kennedy v. Bremerton School District on personal religious observance while serving in an official capacity, 303 Creative LLC v. Elenis on the First Amendment effect on anti-discrimination laws, Chiles v. Salazar on the First Amendment and conversion therapy, United States v. Hemani on the effects of drug use on the Second Amendment, and Ramos v. Louisiana on juries' guilty verdicts.

== Early life and education ==
Gorsuch was born on August 29, 1967, in Denver, Colorado. He was born to Anne Gorsuch Burford (née McGill) and David Ronald Gorsuch. He is the eldest of three children, and is a fourth-generation Coloradan of Irish and English descent. Gorsuch can trace his paternal roots to pre-Revolutionary Maryland: his ancestor Charles Gorsuch was born in England in 1642, moved to Maryland, where he worked as a planter, and died there in 1716. Gorsuch's great-grandfather Joseph M. McGill moved the family from New York City to Colorado in the 1890s.

Gorsuch's parents, like him, were attorneys. They encouraged their children to engage in debate, often spontaneously. From 1976 to 1980, Anne Burford served in the Colorado House of Representatives. In 1981, she was appointed by President Ronald Reagan as the first woman to serve as administrator of the United States Environmental Protection Agency. Her conservative views contrasted with those of her husband, who was a liberal.

Gorsuch attended Christ the King Roman Catholic School, a private grade school in Denver. The school's moral lessons influenced him and he was remembered by classmates for assuming strong stances. He assisted his mother in her campaign for the Colorado legislature at age nine. After her appointment, Gorsuch's family moved to Bethesda, Maryland. He enrolled in Georgetown Preparatory School, a selective Jesuit college-preparatory school, arriving as a freshman in 1981. He was two years junior to future justice Brett Kavanaugh, a classmate he later clerked with at the Supreme Court. Gorsuch was a member of Georgetown Prep's debate, forensics, and international relations clubs, and served as a United States Senate page in the early 1980s. He graduated in 1985 as student body president; in contrast to Kavanaugh, he was described as a fairly outgoing and extroverted student.

Gorsuch attended Columbia University after high school, graduating in 1988 with a Bachelor of Arts, cum laude, in history and politics. He undertook a heavier courseload to graduate in three years. As an undergraduate, he wrote for the Columbia Daily Spectator and co-founded the satirical student publication The Fed in 1986. Gorsuch distinguished himself as an active debater and an ardent conservative, publishing pieces that criticized left-wing politics. After a brief stint as a writer for a short-lived journal, he led efforts to establish The Fed as a conservative alternative to liberal campus newspapers. He was a member of the Phi Gamma Delta fraternity and was inducted into the Phi Beta Kappa honor society.

After graduating from Columbia, Gorsuch attended Harvard Law School on a Harry S. Truman Scholarship. He was an editor of the Harvard Journal of Law and Public Policy and was a member of the Lincoln's Inn Society, the Harvard Prison Legal Assistance Project, and the Harvard Defenders program. Gorsuch was described as a committed conservative who supported the Gulf War and congressional term limits on "a campus full of ardent liberals". Despite his contrasting political views, he was generally well-liked by students. Philip C. Berg, a classmate and close friend, remembered him as "very sensitive" and non-confrontational, recalling when he received Gorsuch's support in coming out as gay. Gorsuch graduated in 1991 with a Juris Doctor, cum laude. Future president Barack Obama was among his classmates.

== Early legal career ==
=== Clerkships ===
Gorsuch served as a law clerk for Judge David B. Sentelle of the United States Court of Appeals for the District of Columbia Circuit from 1991 to 1992. He then clerked for Justices Byron White and Anthony Kennedy from 1993 to 1994. His work with White occurred right after White retired from the Supreme Court; therefore, Gorsuch assisted White with his work on the Tenth Circuit, where White sat by designation. Gorsuch was part of a group of five law clerks assigned that year that included Brett Kavanaugh, who described Gorsuch at the time, saying: "He fit into the place very easily. He's just an easy guy to get along with. He doesn't have sharp elbows. We had a wide range of views, but we all really got along well."

=== Private law practice ===
Instead of joining an established law firm, Gorsuch decided to join the two-year-old boutique firm of Kellogg, Huber, Hansen, Todd, Evans & Figel (now Kellogg, Hansen, Todd, Figel & Frederick), where he focused on trial work. After winning his first trial as lead attorney, a jury member told Gorsuch he was like Perry Mason. He was an associate in the Washington, D.C., law firm from 1995 to 1997 and a partner from 1998 to 2005. Gorsuch's clients included Colorado billionaire Philip Anschutz. At Kellogg Huber, Gorsuch focused on commercial matters, including contracts, antitrust, RICO, and securities fraud.

In 2002, Gorsuch wrote an op-ed criticizing the Senate for delaying the nominations of Merrick Garland and John Roberts to the United States Court of Appeals for the District of Columbia Circuit, writing, "the most impressive judicial nominees are grossly mistreated" by the Senate.

In 2004, Gorsuch received a Doctor of Philosophy in legal philosophy from the University of Oxford, where he completed research on assisted suicide and euthanasia as a postgraduate student at University College. A Marshall Scholarship enabled him to study at Oxford in 1992–93, where he was supervised by the natural law philosopher John Finnis. His thesis was also supervised by Canadian legal scholar Timothy Endicott of Balliol College, Oxford. In 1996, Gorsuch married Louise, an Englishwoman and champion equestrienne on Oxford's riding team whom he met during his stay there.

=== United States Department of Justice ===
Gorsuch served as Principal Deputy to the Associate Attorney General, Robert McCallum, at the United States Department of Justice from June 2005 until July 2006. As McCallum's principal deputy, he assisted in managing the Department of Justice's civil litigation components, which included the antitrust, civil, civil rights, environment, and tax divisions.

While managing the United States Department of Justice Civil Division, Gorsuch was tasked with all the "terror litigation" arising from the president's war on terror, successfully defending the extraordinary rendition of Khalid El-Masri, fighting the disclosure of Abu Ghraib torture and prisoner abuse photographs, and, in November 2005, traveling to inspect the Guantanamo Bay detention camp.

Gorsuch helped Attorney General Alberto Gonzales prepare for hearings after the public revelation of NSA warrantless surveillance (2001–07), and worked with Senator Lindsey Graham in drafting the provisions in the Detainee Treatment Act that attempted to strip federal courts of jurisdiction over the detainees.

== United States Court of Appeals for the Tenth Circuit (2006–2017) ==
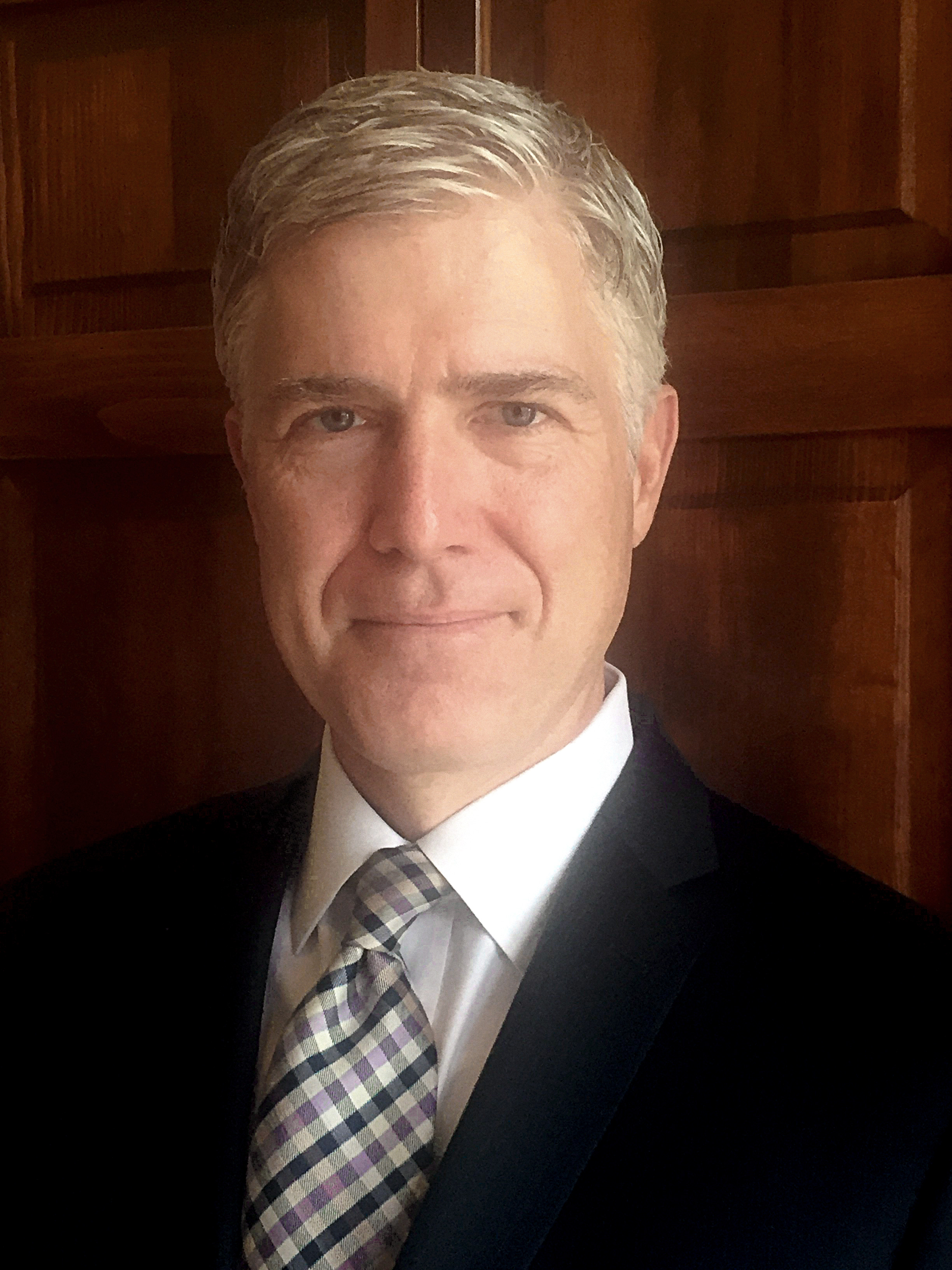
Gorsuch as a judge on the U.S. Court of Appeals for the Tenth Circuit

In January 2006, Philip Anschutz recommended Gorsuch's nomination to Colorado's United States senator Wayne Allard and White House Counsel Harriet Miers. On May 10, 2006, President George W. Bush nominated Gorsuch to the seat on the United States Court of Appeals for the Tenth Circuit vacated by Judge David M. Ebel, who was taking senior status. Like Ebel, Gorsuch was a former clerk of Justice White. The American Bar Association's Standing Committee on the Federal Judiciary unanimously rated him "well qualified" in 2006.

On July 20, 2006, Gorsuch was confirmed by unanimous voice vote in the United States Senate. He was Bush's fifth appointment to the Tenth Circuit. When Gorsuch began his tenure at Denver's Byron White United States Courthouse, Justice Kennedy administered the oath of office.

During his time on the Tenth Circuit, ten of Gorsuch's law clerks went on to become Supreme Court clerks, and he was sometimes regarded as a "feeder judge". One of his former clerks, Jonathan Papik, became an associate justice of the Nebraska Supreme Court in 2018.

=== Freedom of religion ===
Gorsuch advocates a broad definition of religious freedom that is inimical to church–state separation advocates.

In Hobby Lobby Stores v. Sebelius (2013), Gorsuch wrote a concurrence when the en banc circuit found the Affordable Care Act's contraceptive mandate on a private business violated the Religious Freedom Restoration Act. That ruling was upheld 5–4 by the Supreme Court in Burwell v. Hobby Lobby Stores, Inc. (2014). When a panel of the court denied similar claims under the same act in Little Sisters of the Poor Home for the Aged v. Burwell (2015), Gorsuch joined Judges Harris Hartz, Paul Joseph Kelly Jr., Timothy Tymkovich, and Jerome Holmes in their dissent to the denial of rehearing en banc. That ruling was vacated and remanded to the Tenth Circuit by the per curiam Supreme Court in Zubik v. Burwell (2016).

In Pleasant Grove City v. Summum (2007), he joined Judge Michael W. McConnell's dissent from the denial of rehearing en banc, taking the view that the government's display of a donated Ten Commandments monument in a public park did not obligate the government to display other offered monuments. The Supreme Court subsequently adopted most of the dissent's view, reversing the Tenth Circuit's judgment. Gorsuch has written, "the law [...] doesn't just apply to protect popular religious beliefs: it does perhaps its most important work in protecting unpopular religious beliefs, vindicating this nation's long-held aspiration to serve as a refuge of religious tolerance".

=== Administrative law ===
Gorsuch called for reconsideration of Chevron U.S.A., Inc. v. Natural Resources Defense Council, Inc. (1984), in which the Supreme Court instructed courts to grant deference to federal agencies' interpretation of ambiguous laws and regulations. In Gutierrez-Brizuela v. Lynch (2016), Gorsuch wrote for a unanimous panel finding that court review was required before an executive agency could reject the circuit court's interpretation of an immigration law.

Alone, Gorsuch added a concurring opinion, criticizing Chevron deference and National Cable & Telecommunications Ass'n v. Brand X Internet Services (2005) as an "abdication of judicial duty" and writing that deference is "more than a little difficult to square with the Constitution of the framers' design".

In United States v. Hinckley (2008), Gorsuch argued that one possible reading of the Sex Offender Registration and Notification Act likely violates the nondelegation doctrine. Justices Antonin Scalia and Ruth Bader Ginsburg had held the same view in their 2012 dissent in Reynolds v. United States.

=== Interstate commerce ===
Gorsuch has been an opponent of the dormant Commerce Clause, which allows state laws to be declared unconstitutional if they too greatly burden interstate commerce. In 2011, Gorsuch joined a unanimous panel finding that the dormant Commerce Clause did not prevent the Oklahoma Water Resources Board from blocking water exports to Texas. A unanimous Supreme Court affirmed that ruling in Tarrant Regional Water District v. Herrmann (2013).

In 2013, Gorsuch joined a unanimous panel finding that federal courts could not hear a challenge to Colorado's internet sales tax. A unanimous Supreme Court reversed that ruling in Direct Marketing Ass'n v. Brohl (2015). In 2016, the Tenth Circuit panel rejected the challenger's dormant commerce clause claim, with Gorsuch writing a concurrence.

In Energy and Environmental Legal Institute v. Joshua Epel (2015), Gorsuch held that Colorado's mandates for renewable energy did not violate the commerce clause by putting out-of-state coal companies at a disadvantage. He wrote that the Colorado renewable energy law "isn't a price-control statute, it doesn't link prices paid in Colorado with those paid out of state, and it does not discriminate against out-of-staters".

=== Campaign finance ===
In Riddle v. Hickenlooper (2014), Gorsuch joined a unanimous panel of the Tenth Circuit in finding that it was unconstitutional for a Colorado law to set the limit on donations for write-in candidates at half the amount for major party candidates. He added a concurrence noting that although the standard of review of campaign finance in the United States is unclear, the Colorado law would fail even under intermediate scrutiny.

=== Civil rights ===
In Planned Parenthood v. Herbert (2016), Gorsuch wrote for the four dissenting judges when the Tenth Circuit denied a full rehearing of a divided panel opinion that had ordered the Utah governor to resume the organization's funding, which Herbert had blocked in response to a video controversy.

In A.M. v. Holmes (2016), the Tenth Circuit considered a case in which a 13-year-old child was arrested for burping and laughing in gym class. The child was handcuffed and arrested based on a New Mexico statute that makes it a misdemeanor to disrupt school activities. The child's family brought a federal § 1983 civil rights action against school officials and the school resource officer who made the arrest, arguing that it was a false arrest that violated the child's constitutional rights. In a 94-page majority opinion, the Tenth Circuit held that the defendants enjoyed qualified immunity from suit. Gorsuch wrote a four-page dissent, arguing that the New Mexico Court of Appeals had "long ago alerted law enforcement" that the statute that the officer relied upon for the child's arrest does not criminalize noises or diversions that merely disturb order in a classroom.

=== Criminal law ===
In 2009, Gorsuch wrote for a unanimous panel finding that a court may still order criminals to pay restitution even after it missed a statutory deadline. The Supreme Court affirmed that ruling 5–4 in Dolan v. United States (2010).

In United States v. Games-Perez (2012), Gorsuch ruled on a case where a felon owned a gun in violation of 18 U.S.C. § 922(g)(1), but alleged that he did not know that he was a felon at the time. Gorsuch joined the majority in upholding the conviction based on Tenth Circuit precedent, but filed a concurring opinion arguing that said precedent was wrongly decided: "The only statutory element separating innocent (even constitutionally protected) gun possession from criminal conduct in §§ 922(g) and 924(a) is a prior felony conviction. So the presumption that the government must prove mens rea here applies with full force." In the 2019 case Rehaif v. United States, the Supreme Court overruled this decision, with Gorsuch joining.

In 2013, Gorsuch joined a unanimous panel finding that intent does not need to be proven under a bank fraud statute. A unanimous Supreme Court affirmed that ruling in Loughrin v. United States (2014). In 2015, Gorsuch wrote a dissent to the denial of rehearing en banc when the Tenth Circuit found that a convicted sex offender had to register with Kansas after he moved to the Philippines. A unanimous Supreme Court reversed the Tenth Circuit in Nichols v. United States (2016).

=== Death penalty ===
Gorsuch favors a strict reading of the Antiterrorism and Effective Death Penalty Act of 1996 (AEDPA). In 2015, he wrote for the court when it permitted Oklahoma attorney general Scott Pruitt to order the execution of Scott Eizember, prompting a 30-page dissent by Judge Mary Beck Briscoe. After the state's unsuccessful execution of Clayton Lockett, Gorsuch joined Briscoe when the court unanimously allowed Pruitt to continue using the same lethal injection protocol. The Supreme Court upheld that ruling 5–4 in Glossip v. Gross (2015).

=== List of judicial opinions ===
During his tenure on the United States Court of Appeals for the Tenth Circuit, Gorsuch authored 212 published opinions. Some of those are:

- United States v. Hinckley, 550 F. 3d 926 (2008), on principles of interpretation and construction of a statute, according to plain meaning and context
- United States v. Ford, 550 F. 3d 975 (2008) on entrapment and email evidence
- Blausey v. US Trustee, 552 F. 3d 1124 (2009), on procedure
- Williams v. Jones, 583 F. 3d 1254 (2009), dissent, on murder and evidence
- Wilson v. Workman, 577 F. 3d 1284 (2009), habeas corpus writ procedure
- Fisher v. City of Las Cruces, 584 F. 3d 888 (2009), Fourth Amendment excessive force claims against police officers
- Strickland v. United Parcel Service, Inc., 555 F. 3d 1224 (2009), on gender discrimination and harassment, arguing that if men are treated as equally badly as women, there is no claim
- American Atheists, Inc. v. Davenport, 637 F. 3d 1095 (2010), on crosses displayed on highways
- Flitton v. Primary Residential Mortgage, Inc., 614 F. 3d 1173 (2010), on jurisdiction over attorney fees in a gender discrimination and retaliation case
- Laborers' International Union, Local 578 v. NLRB, 594 F. 3d 732 (2010), dismissing the union's challenge to a National Labor Relations Board (NLRB) finding that the union committed an unfair labor practice by persuading a company to dismiss a worker who did not pay union dues
- McClendon v. City of Albuquerque, 630 F. 3d 1288 (2011), dismissing class action lawsuit over inhumane jail conditions
- Public Service Co. of New Mexico v. NLRB, 692 F. 3d 1068 (2012), dismissing a union's claim that the NLRB was wrong to not find an unfair labor practice, when an employer dismissed a worker for deliberately disconnecting a customer's gas supply (no evidence that it treated this employee differently)
- United States v. Games-Perez, 695 F. 3d 1104 (2012), on imprisonment without trial
- United States v. Games-Perez, 667 F. 3d 1136 (2012), on criminal law procedure
- Hobby Lobby Stores, Inc. v. Sebelius, 723 F. 3d 1114 (2013), on the Affordable Care Act and religious freedom
- Niemi v. Lasshofer, 728 F. 3d 1252 (2013) fugitive disentitlement doctrine
- Riddle v. Hickenlooper, 742 F. 3d 922 (2014), stating: "No one before us disputes that the act of contributing to political campaigns implicates a 'basic constitutional freedom,' one lying 'at the foundation of a free society' and enjoying a significant relationship to the right to speak and associate—both expressly protected First Amendment activities. Buckley v. Valeo, 424 U.S. 1, 26 (1976)"
- Yellowbear v. Lampert, 741 F. 3d 48 (2014), freedom to practice religion in prison
- Teamsters Local Union No. 455 v. NLRB, 765 F. 3d 1198 (2014), denying a labor union's claim that a lockout entitled employees to back pay, under the NLRA 1935, 29 USC § 158(a)(1)
- United States v. Krueger, 809 F. 3d 1109 (2015), regarding the Fourth Amendment and search and seizures
- International Union of Operating Engineers v. NLRB, 635 Fed. Appx. 480 (2015), on NLRB's review of an unfair labor practice by a union, removing an employee from an eligible work list and refusing her the right to review
- United States v. Arthurs (2016), evidence
- United States v. Mitchell (2016), evidence, tracking without a warrant
- NLRB v. Community Health Services, 812 F.3d 768 (2016), dissenting, arguing against an NLRB decision that interim earnings should not be disregarded when calculating back pay for employees whose hours were unlawfully reduced
- TransAm Trucking v. Administrative Review Board, 833 F. 3d 1206 (2016) Archived March 29, 2017, at the Wayback Machine, dissenting against the majority's judgment that an employee was unjustly dismissed.
- Gutierrez-Brizuela v. Lynch, 834 F.3d 1142 (2016), on U.S. administrative law, doubting the doctrine of deference to the federal government by courts in Chevron U.S.A., Inc. v. Natural Resources Defense Council, Inc., 467 U.S. 837 (1984)

== Nomination to Supreme Court ==
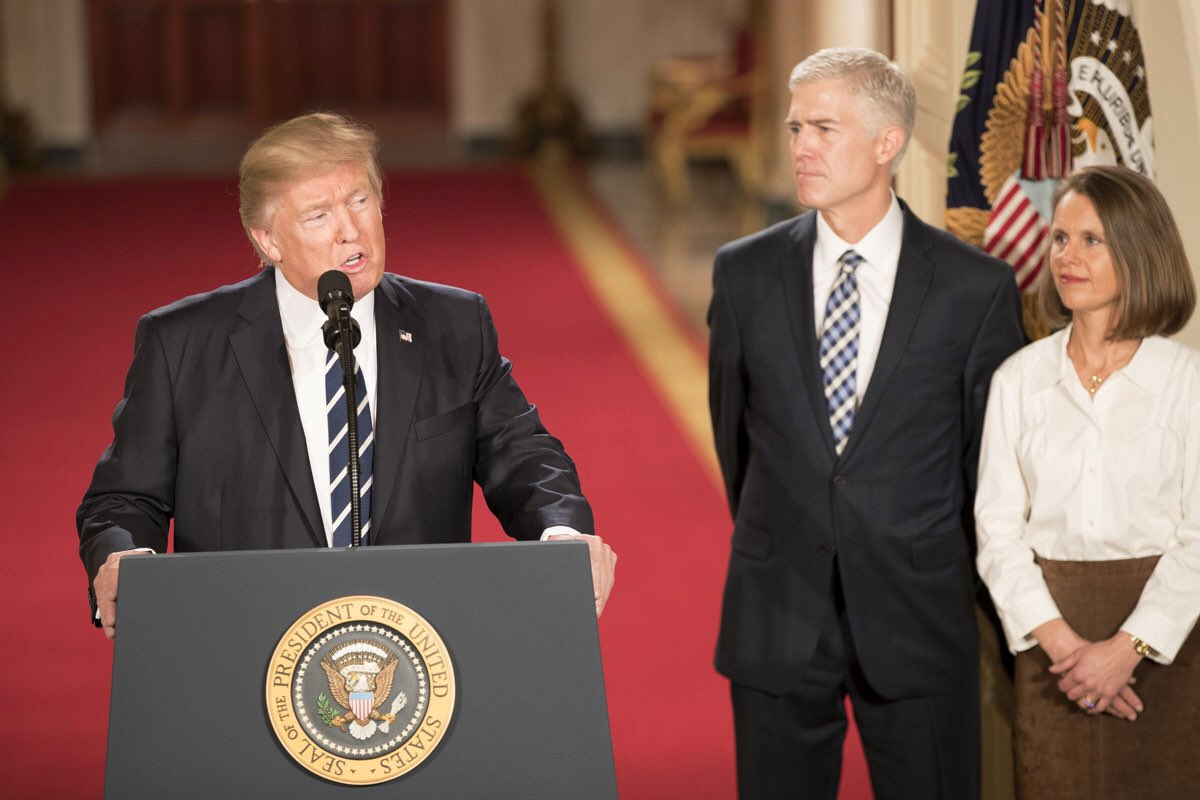
President Donald Trump introduces Gorsuch, accompanied by his wife Marie Louise Gorsuch, as his nominee for the Supreme Court at the White House on January 31, 2017.

During the 2016 U.S. presidential election, candidate Donald Trump included Gorsuch, as well as his circuit colleague Timothy Tymkovich, in a list of 21 judges whom Trump would consider nominating to the Supreme Court if elected. After Trump took office in January 2017, unnamed advisers listed Gorsuch in a shorter list of eight, who they said were the leading contenders to be nominated to fill the seat left vacant by the death of Justice Antonin Scalia.

On January 31, 2017, Trump announced his nomination of Gorsuch to the Supreme Court. Gorsuch was 49 years old at the time of the nomination, making him the youngest nominee to the Supreme Court since the 1991 nomination of Clarence Thomas, who was 43. It was reported by the Associated Press that, as a courtesy, Gorsuch's first call after the nomination was to President Obama's pick for the same position, Merrick Garland, Chief Judge of the United States Court of Appeals for the District of Columbia Circuit. Obama had nominated Garland on March 16, 2016, but Senate Judiciary Committee chairman Chuck Grassley did not schedule a hearing for him, leaving Garland's nomination to expire on January 3, 2017. Senate majority leader Mitch McConnell invoked the so-called "Biden Rule" (of 1992) to justify the Senate's refusal to consider Garland's nomination in a general election year.

Trump formally transmitted his nomination to the Senate on February 1, 2017. The American Bar Association unanimously gave Gorsuch its top rating—"Well Qualified"—to serve as Associate Justice of the United States Supreme Court. His confirmation hearing before the Senate started on March 20, 2017.

On April 3, the Senate Judiciary Committee approved his nomination with a party-line 11–9 vote. On April 6, 2017, Democrats filibustered (prevented cloture) the confirmation vote, after which Republicans invoked the "nuclear option", allowing a filibuster of a Supreme Court nominee to be broken by a simple majority vote.

On April 4, BuzzFeed and Politico ran articles highlighting similar language occurring in Gorsuch's book The Future of Assisted Suicide and Euthanasia and an earlier law review article by Abigail Lawlis Kuzma, Indiana's deputy attorney general. Academic experts contacted by Politico "differed in their assessment of what Gorsuch did, ranging from calling it a clear impropriety to mere sloppiness."

John Finnis, who supervised Gorsuch's dissertation at Oxford, said, "The allegation is entirely without foundation. The book is meticulous in its citation of primary sources. The allegation that the book is guilty of plagiarism because it does not cite secondary sources which draw on those same primary sources is, frankly, absurd." Kuzma said, "I have reviewed both passages and do not see an issue here, even though the language is similar. These passages are factual, not analytical in nature, framing both the technical legal and medical circumstances of the 'Baby/Infant Doe' case that occurred in 1982." In his book on Gorsuch, John Greenya described how Gorsuch was challenged during his confirmation hearings concerning some of his dissertation advisor's more strident views, which Gorsuch generally disagreed with.

On April 7, 2017, the Senate confirmed Gorsuch's nomination to the Supreme Court by a 54–45 vote, with three Democrats (Heidi Heitkamp, Joe Manchin, and Joe Donnelly) joining all Republicans in attendance.

Gorsuch received his commission on April 8, 2017. He was sworn into office on Monday, April 10, 2017, in two ceremonies. The chief justice of the United States administered the constitutional oath of office in a private ceremony at 9 a.m. at the Supreme Court, making Gorsuch the 101st associate justice of the Court. At 11 a.m., Justice Kennedy administered the judicial oath of office in a public ceremony at the White House Rose Garden.

== United States Supreme Court (2017–present) ==
According to The New York Times, Gorsuch's time on the Supreme Court has been defined by his "folksy demeanor and a flashy writing style" with Jonathan H. Adler presenting Gorsuch and fellow Trump-appointed justice Kavanaugh as "a study in contrasts". The Los Angeles Times described his rulings as those of "a wild card" and wrote that Gorsuch tends "to go his own way and chart a course that does not always align with the traditional views on the right or the left". Vox has called him the court's "most libertarian" justice.

According to CNBC, Gorsuch's rulings address "historical injustice in a way that seems at odds with Republican attacks on 'woke' history's being taught in schools", particularly on questions involving Native Americans and tribal law. Gorsuch has a reputation as the most defendant-friendly justice on the court's conservative wing, with Slate calling him and Ketanji Brown Jackson "the Supreme Court's oddest pairing" owing to their occasional tendency to side together on cases involving defendants' rights in criminal trials; Gorsuch sided with criminal defendants in 45 percent of cases the court heard. In corporate law, Gorsuch's rulings have exemplified "procedural originalism", what Slate has called "taking the history of jurisdiction seriously, and applying the original meaning even when it leads to results that rankle the highest-paid corporate litigators in the game".

Vox's Ian Millhiser has written that, while Gorsuch's rulings sometimes depart from orthodoxy on areas where there is philosophical disagreement among conservatives, they "reliably align with the consensus" in areas where there is unanimity in conservative ideology. A 2024 quantitative analysis of Gorsuch's rulings found that he broadly tended to side with justices Clarence Thomas and Samuel Alito more than any other two justices.

=== Banking regulation ===
Gorsuch wrote his first United States Supreme Court decision for a unanimous court in Henson v. Santander Consumer USA Inc., 582 U.S. ___ (2017). The Court ruled against the borrowers, holding that Santander in this case was not a debt collector under the Fair Debt Collection Practices Act since it purchased the original defaulted car loans from CitiFinancial for pennies on the dollar, making Santander the owner of the debts and not merely an agent. When the act was enacted, regulations were put on institutions that collected other companies' debts, but the act left unaddressed businesses collecting their own debts.

=== First Amendment ===
Gorsuch joined the majority in National Institute of Family and Life Advocates v. Becerra and Janus v. AFSCME, which both held unconstitutional certain forms of compelled speech.

Gorsuch authored the majority opinion in Kennedy v. Bremerton School District (2022), which concerned a public high school football coach who was fired for praying on the field after games. The opinion held that the coach's conduct was protected by both the Free Speech and Free Exercise clauses of the First Amendment, and that the school's attempt to stop him was not mandated by the amendment's Establishment Clause.

Gorsuch wrote the majority opinion in 303 Creative LLC v. Elenis (2023), which held that the Free Speech Clause protected a web designer's freedom to sell custom wedding websites only for opposite-sex weddings, notwithstanding a Colorado law prohibiting businesses from discriminating on the basis of sexual orientation.

=== LGBT rights ===
In 2017, in Pavan v. Smith, the Supreme Court "summarily overruled" the Arkansas Supreme Court's decision to deny same-sex married parents the same right to appear on the birth certificate. Gorsuch wrote a dissent, joined by Thomas and Alito, arguing that the Court should have fully heard the arguments of the case.

In 2020, Gorsuch wrote the majority opinion in the combined cases of Bostock v. Clayton County, Altitude Express Inc. v. Zarda, and R.G. & G.R. Harris Funeral Homes Inc. v. Equal Employment Opportunity Commission, ruling that businesses cannot discriminate in employment against LGBTQ people. He argued that discrimination based on sexual orientation was illegal discrimination on the basis of sex, because the employer would be discriminating "for traits or actions it would not have questioned in members of a different sex". The ruling was 6–3, with Gorsuch joined by Chief Justice Roberts and the Court's four Democratic appointees. Justices Thomas, Alito, and Kavanaugh dissented from the decision, arguing that it improperly extended the Civil Rights Act to include sexual orientation and gender identity.

In October 2020, Gorsuch agreed with the justices in an "apparently unanimous" decision to deny an appeal from Kim Davis, a county clerk who refused to issue marriage licenses to same-sex couples. In June 2021, he joined the justices in the unanimous Fulton v. City of Philadelphia decision, ruling in favor of a Catholic adoption agency that had been denied a contract by the City of Philadelphia due to the agency's refusal to adopt to same-sex couples. Gorsuch and Thomas joined Alito's concurrence, which argued for reconsidering, possibly overturning, Employment Division v. Smith, "an important precedent limiting First Amendment protections for religious practices." Also in 2021, Gorsuch was one of three justices, with Thomas and Alito, who voted to hear an appeal from a Washington State florist who had refused service to a same-sex couple based on her religious beliefs against same-sex marriage. In November 2021, Gorsuch dissented from the Court's 6–3 decision to reject an appeal from Mercy San Juan Medical Center, a hospital affiliated with the Roman Catholic Church, which had sought to deny a hysterectomy to a transgender patient on religious grounds. The decision to reject the appeal left in place a lower court ruling in the patient's favor; Thomas and Alito also dissented. In November 2023, Gorsuch voted with the 6–3 majority to decline to hear a case against Washington State's ban on conversion therapy for minors, allowing the law to stand; Kavanaugh, Thomas, and Alito dissented.

=== Second Amendment ===
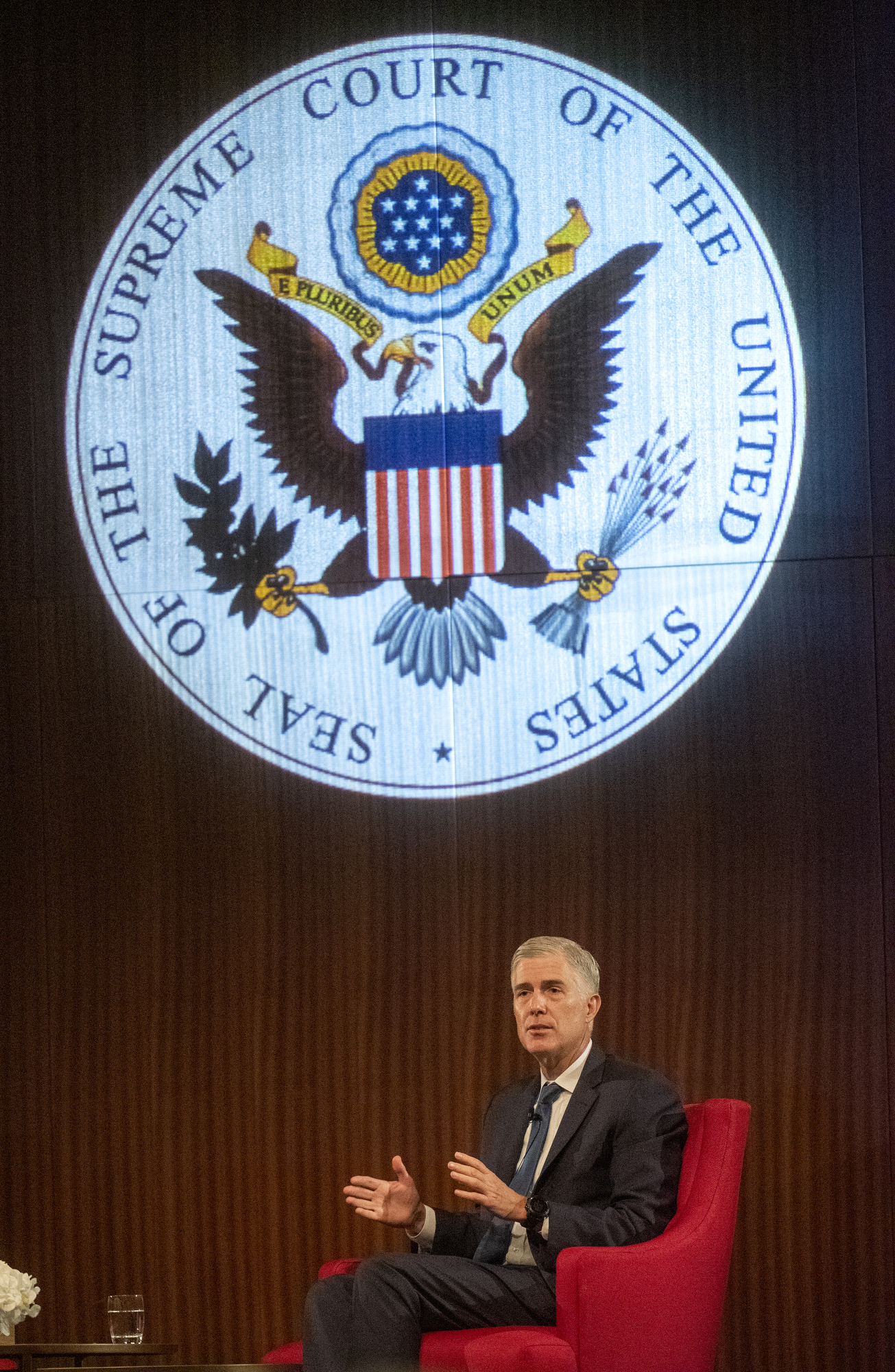
Gorsuch at the LBJ Presidential Library in 2019

Gorsuch joined Thomas's dissent from denial of certiorari in Peruta v. San Diego County, in which the Ninth Circuit had upheld California's restrictive concealed carry laws.

Gorsuch wrote a statement regarding the denial of an application for a stay presented to Roberts in Guedes v. Bureau of Alcohol, Tobacco, Firearms, and Explosives, a 2019 District of Columbia Circuit case challenging the Trump administration's ban on bump stocks. In his statement Gorsuch criticized the Trump Administration's action as well as the justification the United States Court of Appeals for the District of Columbia Circuit used for upholding the ban.

=== Vagueness doctrine ===
In Sessions v. Dimaya (2018), the Supreme Court ruled 5–4 to uphold the Ninth Circuit's decision that the residual clause in the Immigration and Nationality Act was unconstitutionally vague. Gorsuch joined Justices Kagan, Ginsburg, Breyer, and Sotomayor in the opinion, and wrote a separate concurrence reiterating the importance of the vagueness doctrine within Scalia's 2015 opinion in Johnson. In United States v. Davis (2019), Gorsuch wrote the Opinion of the Court striking down the residual clause of the Hobbs Act based on the rationale used in Dimaya.

=== Abortion ===
In December 2018, Gorsuch dissented when the Court voted against hearing cases brought by the states of Louisiana and Kansas to deny Medicaid funding to Planned Parenthood. He and Alito joined Thomas's dissent arguing that it was the Court's job to hear the case.

In February 2019, Gorsuch sided with three of the Court's other conservative justices, rejecting a stay to temporarily block a law restricting abortion in Louisiana. The law that the court temporarily stayed, in a 5–4 decision, would require that doctors performing abortions have admitting privileges in a hospital. In June 2020, the Supreme Court struck down Louisiana's abortion restriction in June Medical Services, LLC v. Russo, a 5–4 decision; Gorsuch was among the four dissenters. In September 2021, the Supreme Court declined a petition to block a Texas law banning abortion after six weeks; the vote was 5–4 with Gorsuch in the majority, joined by Thomas, Alito, Kavanaugh, and Barrett.

In June 2022, Gorsuch was among the five justices who formed the majority opinion in Dobbs v. Jackson Women's Health Organization, which ruled there is no constitutional right to abortion, overturning Roe v. Wade and Planned Parenthood v. Casey.

=== American Indian law and relations ===
Gorsuch is regarded as an authority on American Indian law. During his time on the Supreme Court, he has frequently affirmed tribal rights; his appointment to the Court was supported by multiple tribes and Native American organizations due to his favorable rulings as a Tenth Circuit judge.

In March 2019, Gorsuch joined the four liberal justices (in two plurality opinions) in a 5–4 majority in Washington State Dept. of Licensing v. Cougar Den, Inc. The Court's decision sided with the Yakama Nation, striking down a Washington state tax on transporting gasoline, on the basis of an 1855 treaty in which the Yakama ceded a large portion of Washington in exchange for certain rights. Gorsuch ended his concurrence by writing: "Really, this case just tells an old and familiar story. The State of Washington includes millions of acres that the Yakamas ceded to the United States under significant pressure. In return, the government supplied a handful of modest promises. The state is now dissatisfied with the consequences of one of those promises. It is a new day, and now it wants more. But today and to its credit, the Court holds the parties to the terms of their deal. It is the least we can do."

In May 2019, Gorsuch again joined the four more liberal justices in a decision favorable to Native Americans' treaty rights, signing on to Justice Sotomayor's opinion to reach a 5–4 decision in Herrera v. Wyoming. The case held that hunting rights in Montana and Wyoming, granted by the United States government to the Native American Crow people by an 1868 treaty, were not extinguished by the 1890 grant of statehood to Wyoming.

In July 2020, Gorsuch again joined the liberal justices to make a 5–4 majority in McGirt v. Oklahoma. The case considered whether much of eastern Oklahoma still remained under the jurisdiction of the "Five Civilized Tribes", given that the Native American Treaties that had designated the region as under their reservation status had never been dissolved by Congress, and, if so, whether crimes committed by Native Americans against other Native Americans on tribal land were under the jurisdiction of Native Courts. The landmark decision in the affirmative, written by Gorsuch, found that "For Major Crimes Act purposes, land reserved for the Creek Nation since the 19th century remains 'Indian country.'" In the opinion, he wrote: "Today we are asked whether the land these treaties promised remains an Indian reservation for purposes of federal criminal law. Because Congress has not said otherwise, we hold the government to its word." The case was later reviewed in the June 2022 case Oklahoma v. Castro-Huerta, which considered whether non-Natives who committed crimes against Natives on Native American territory can be charged under the jurisdiction of Native American tribal courts. While the state of Oklahoma had initially argued for the overturning of McGirt, the Court agreed to hear only issues relating to the impacts of McGirt. The 5–4 decision by Justice Brett Kavanaugh opposed the more expanded viewpoint of non-Native criminal jurisdiction, with the opinion giving jurisdiction over such crimes to both tribal and federal/state governments. Gorsuch derided the opinion in his dissent, writing, "Where this Court once stood firm, today it wilts."

On June 15, 2022, Gorsuch, Barrett, and the three liberal justices ruled in favor of the Native American Tribes of Texas in the case Ysleta del Sur Pueblo v. Texas. The case concerned a dispute over whether Texas could control and regulate gambling on Texan Native American reservations. The initial conflict had developed from the tribes' having been in a trust with Texas from 1968 to 1987 before being granted a federal trust, resulting in a statute governing the tribes' subjugation to Texas's gambling restrictions. The ruling emphasized that the tribes have the power to regulate electronic bingo games on their land regardless of the state's prohibition of non-prohibited gambling. Thus, as long as a game is not outright prohibited by the state of Texas, the state government cannot impose regulations upon tribal games. Gorsuch emphasized in his opinion that "None of this is to say that the Tribe may offer gaming on whatever terms it wishes [...] Other gaming activities are subject to tribal regulation and must conform to the terms and conditions set forth in federal law."

=== COVID-19 restrictions ===
On November 26, 2020, Gorsuch joined the majority opinion in Roman Catholic Diocese of Brooklyn v. Cuomo, which struck down COVID-19 restrictions imposed by the state of New York on houses of worship.

On May 18, 2023, Gorsuch issued a statement about the Court's decision to dismiss a lawsuit by several states aimed at continuing Title 42 expulsions of immigrants, a policy instituted to prevent the introduction of COVID-19 cases to the United States. His statement criticized many of the restrictions the government had imposed since the pandemic started and said, "Since March 2020, we may have experienced the greatest intrusions on civil liberties in the peacetime history of this country."

== Legal philosophy ==
Gorsuch is a proponent of originalism, the idea that the Constitution should be interpreted as perceived at the time of enactment, and of textualism, the idea that statutes should be interpreted literally, without considering the legislative history and underlying purpose of the law. An editorial in the National Catholic Register opined that Gorsuch's judicial decisions lean more toward natural law philosophy.

In January 2019, Bonnie Kristian of The Week wrote that an "unexpected civil libertarian alliance" was developing between Gorsuch and Sotomayor "in defense of robust due process rights and skepticism of law enforcement overreach."

=== Voting alignment ===
FiveThirtyEight used Lee Epstein et al.'s Judicial Common Space scores (which are not based on a judge's behavior, but rather the ideology scores of either home state senators or the appointing president) to find a close alignment between the conservatism of other appellate and Supreme Court justices such as Kavanaugh, Thomas, and Alito. The Washington Post's statistical analysis estimated that the ideologies of most of Trump's announced candidates were "statistically indistinguishable" and also associated Gorsuch with Kavanaugh and Alito.

=== Judicial activism ===
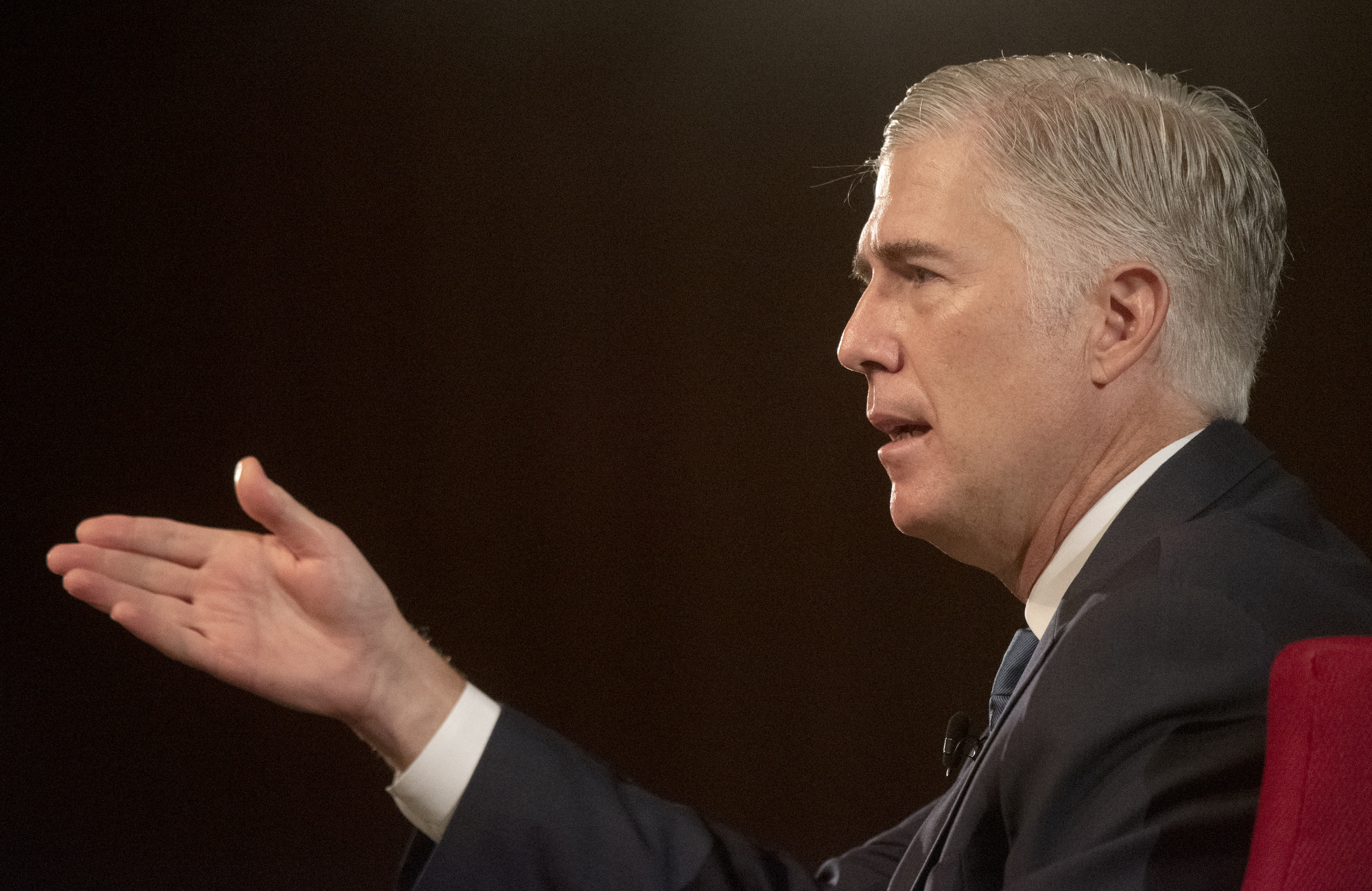
Gorsuch in 2019

In a 2016 speech at Case Western Reserve University, Gorsuch said that judges should strive to apply the law as it is, focusing backward, not forward, and looking to text, structure, and history to decide what a reasonable reader at the time of the events in question would have understood the law to be—not to decide cases based on their own moral convictions or the policy consequences they believe might serve society best.

In a 2005 National Review article, Gorsuch argued that "American liberals have become addicted to the courtroom, relying on judges and lawyers rather than elected leaders and the ballot box, as the primary means of effecting their social agenda" and that they are "failing to reach out and persuade the public". He wrote that, in doing so, American liberals are circumventing the democratic process on issues like gay marriage, school vouchers, and assisted suicide, and this has led to a compromised judiciary, which is no longer independent. Gorsuch wrote that American liberals' "overweening addiction" to using the courts for social debate is "bad for the nation and bad for the judiciary".

=== Federalism and state power ===
Justin Marceau, a professor at the University of Denver's Sturm College of Law, called Gorsuch "a predictably socially conservative judge who tends to favor state power over federal power". Marceau added that this is important because federal laws have been used to try to reel in "rogue" state laws in civil rights cases.

=== Assisted suicide ===
In July 2006, Gorsuch's book The Future of Assisted Suicide and Euthanasia, developed from his doctoral thesis, was published by Princeton University Press. In the book, Gorsuch makes clear his personal opposition to euthanasia and assisted suicide, arguing that the United States should "retain existing law [banning assisted suicide and euthanasia] on the basis that human life is fundamentally and inherently valuable, and that the intentional taking of human life by private persons is always wrong."

=== Statutory interpretation ===
Gorsuch has been considered to follow in Scalia's footsteps as a textualist in statutory interpretation of the plain meaning of the law. This was exemplified in his majority opinion in Bostock v. Clayton County, 590 U.S. ___ (2020), which ruled that Title VII of the Civil Rights Act of 1964 grants protection from employment discrimination due to sexual orientation and gender identity. Gorsuch wrote in the decision, "An employer who fired an individual for being homosexual or transgender fires that person for traits or actions it would not have questioned in members of a different sex. Sex plays a necessary and undisguisable role in the decision, exactly what Title VII forbids."

== Personal life ==
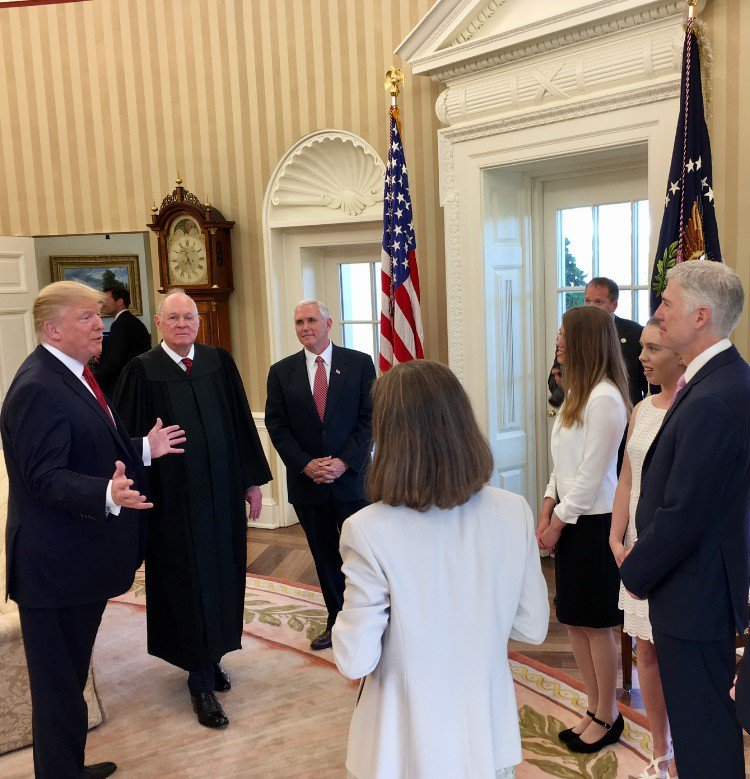
Gorsuch and family with Donald Trump, Anthony Kennedy, and Mike Pence prior to his swearing-in

Gorsuch and his wife, Marie Louise Gorsuch, a British citizen, met at Oxford. The two married at St. Nicholas' Anglican Church in Henley-on-Thames in 1996. They live in Boulder, Colorado, and have two daughters, Emma and Belinda.

Gorsuch enjoys the outdoors and fly fishing; he went fly fishing on at least one occasion with Justice Scalia. He raises horses, chickens, and goats, and often arranges ski trips with colleagues and friends.

He has authored three nonfiction books. The first, The Future of Assisted Suicide and Euthanasia, was published by Princeton University Press in July 2006. He is a co-author of The Law of Judicial Precedent, published by Thomson West in 2016. In 2024, Gorsuch co-wrote Over Ruled: The Human Toll of Too Much Law, a critique of overregulation and mass incarceration.

In 2017, after his announcement as a Supreme Court nominee, the New York Times reported that Gorsuch owned a timeshare outside Granby, Colorado, with associates of Philip Anschutz, that was later sold the same year. Reporting from Politico in April 2023 revealed that Gorsuch had sold the cabin to Brian Duffy, the CEO of the law firm Greenberg Traurig, which litigates cases before the Supreme Court, but failed to disclose the purchaser's identity on his federal disclosure forms. The property was listed for sale for a few years but did not go under contract until the week after Gorsuch joined the Supreme Court. Since 2017, Greenberg Traurig has been involved in at least 22 cases before or presented to the Supreme Court.

Gorsuch has been active in several professional associations throughout his legal career, including the American Bar Association, the American Trial Lawyers Association, Phi Beta Kappa, the Republican National Lawyers Association, and the New York, Colorado, and District of Columbia Bar Associations. In May 2019, it was announced that Gorsuch would become the new chairman of the board of the National Constitution Center, succeeding former vice president Joe Biden.

=== Religion ===
Gorsuch was the first member of a mainline Protestant denomination to sit on the Supreme Court since the retirement of John Paul Stevens in 2010. He and his two siblings were raised Catholic and attended weekly Mass. His wife, Louise, is British-born; the two met while Neil was studying at Oxford. Louise was raised in the Church of England.

When the couple returned to the United States they joined Holy Comforter, an Episcopal parish in Vienna, Virginia, attending weekly services. Gorsuch volunteered there as an usher. The Gorsuch family later attended St. John's Episcopal Church in Boulder, Colorado, a liberal church with a longstanding open-door policy for the LGBT community. During his 2017 confirmation hearing, responding to a senator's question about his faith, Gorsuch replied, "I attend an Episcopal church in Boulder with my family, senator." After marrying in a non-Catholic ceremony and joining an Episcopal church, Gorsuch has not publicly clarified his religious affiliation.

== Selected works ==
=== Books ===
- Gorsuch, Neil (2004). The right to receive assistance in suicide and euthanasia, with particular reference to the law of the United States (DPhil thesis). University of Oxford.
- — (2009). The Future of Assisted Suicide and Euthanasia. Princeton, NJ: Princeton University Press. doi:10.1515/9781400830343. ISBN 978-1-4008-3034-3.
- — (2019). A Republic, If You Can Keep It. New York: Crown Forum. ISBN 978-0-525-57678-5.
- —; Nitze, Janie (2024). Over Ruled: The Human Toll of Too Much Law. New York: Harper. ISBN 9780063238473.

=== Articles ===
- Gorsuch, Neil; Guzman, Michael (1991). "Will the Gentlemen Please Yield? A Defense of the Constitutionality of State-Imposed Term Limitations". Hofstra Law Review. 20: 341–385.
- — (2000). "The Right to Assisted Suicide and Euthanasia" (PDF). Harvard Journal of Law and Public Policy. 23 (2): 599–710. PMID 12524693. Archived from the original (PDF) on January 19, 2021.
- — (2004). "The Legalization of Assisted Suicide and the Law of Unintended Consequences: A Review of the Dutch and Oregon Experiments and Leading Utilitarian Arguments for Legal Change". Wisconsin Law Review. 2004: 1347–2424. Archived from the original on November 11, 2020.
- — (2007). "A Reply to Raymond Tallis on the Legalization of Assisted Suicide and Euthanasia". Journal of Legal Medicine. 28 (3): 327–332. doi:10.1080/01947640701554468. PMID 17885904. S2CID 36871391.
- — (2014). "Law's Irony (Thirteenth Annual Barbara K. Olson Memorial Lecture)" (PDF). Harvard Journal of Law and Public Policy. 37 (3): 743–756. Archived from the original (PDF) on July 30, 2017.
- — (2016). "Of Lions and Bears, Judges and Legislators, and the Legacy of Justice Scalia (2016 Sumner Canary Memorial Lecture)". Case Western Reserve Law Review. 66 (4): 905–920.
- — (2016). "Access to Affordable Justice: A Challenge to the Bench, Bar, and Academy" (PDF). Judicature. 100 (3): 46–55. Archived from the original (PDF) on February 2, 2017.
- — (2018). "In Tribute: Justice Anthony M. Kennedy" (PDF). Harvard Law Review. 132: 3–5.

==== Other ====
- Gorsuch, Neil (November 4, 1992). "Rule of Law: The Constitutional Case for Term Limits". The Wall Street Journal. p. A15.
- Gorsuch, Neil (May 4, 2002). "Justice White and judicial excellence". United Press International. Archived from the original on October 31, 2020.
- Gorsuch, Neil (March 18, 2004). "Letter to the Editor: Nonpartisan Fee Awards". The Washington Post. p. A30. Archived from the original on October 31, 2020.
- Gorsuch, Neil; Matey, Paul (January 31, 2005). "No Loss, No Gain". Legal Times.
- Gorsuch, Neil (February 7, 2005). "Liberals'N'Lawsuits". National Review Online. Archived from the original on October 31, 2020.
- Gorsuch, Neil; Matey, Paul (2005). "Settlements in Securities Fraud Class Actions: Improving Investor Protections" (PDF). Critical Legal Issues Working Paper Series. 128.
- Gorsuch, Neil (May 18, 2007). "The assisted suicide debate". The Times Literary Supplement.
- Gorsuch, Neil (2013). "Intention and the Allocation of Risk". In Keown, John; George, Robert (eds.). Reason, Morality, and Law. The Philosophy of John Finnis. Oxford University Press. pp. 413–424. doi:10.1093/acprof:oso/9780199675500.003.0026. ISBN 978-0-19-967550-0.
- Gorsuch, Neil; Coats, Nathan; Dunn, Stephanie; Myhre, Blain; Witt, Jesse (2013). "Effective Brief Writing". Appellate Practice Update 2013. OCLC 889590599.
- Gorsuch, Neil (September 5, 2019). "Disregarding the Separation of Powers Has Real-Life Consequences". National Review. Archived from the original on October 31, 2020.

=== Speeches ===
- Gorsuch, Neil (September 3, 2016). Legacy of Supreme Court Justice Antonin Scalia (video 59:59 mins). Tenth Circuit Court Bench & Bar Conference. Colorado Springs, Colorado: C-SPAN.

== See also ==
- Donald Trump judicial appointment controversies
- List of law clerks for the first seat of the Supreme Court of the United States
- List of law clerks for the sixth seat of the Supreme Court of the United States

Legal offices
Preceded by David M. Ebel	Judge of the United States Court of Appeals for the Tenth Circuit; 2006–2017	Succeeded by Allison H. Eid
Preceded by Antonin Scalia	Associate Justice of the Supreme Court of the United States; 2017–present	Incumbent
U.S. order of precedence (ceremonial)
Preceded by Elena Kagan	Order of precedence of the United States as Associate Justice of the Supreme Court	Succeeded by Brett Kavanaugh
