= Ysleta del Sur Pueblo and Alabama and Coushatta Indian Tribes of Texas Restoration Act =

United States federal statute

- Long title: To provide for the restoration of the Federal trust relationship and Federal services and assistance to the Ysleta del Sur Pueblo and the Alabama and Coushatta Indian Tribes of Texas, and for other purposes
- Enacted by: the 100th United States Congress
- Effective: August 18, 1987

Citations
- Public law: Pub. L. 100–89
- Statutes at Large: 101 Stat. 666

Legislative history
- Introduced in the House of Representatives as H.R. 318 the Ysleta del Sur Pueblo and Alabama and Coushatta Indian Tribes of Texas Restoration Act by Ron Coleman (Texas politician)(D–TX) on January 06, 1987; Committee consideration by House Interior and Insular Affairs and Senate Indian Affairs; Passed the House on April 21, 1987; Passed the Senate as the Ysleta del Sur Pueblo and Alabama and Coushatta Indian Tribes of Texas Restoration Act on July 23, 1987; Signed into law by President Ronald Reagan on August 18, 1987

The Ysleta del Sur Pueblo and Alabama and Coushatta Indian Tribes of Texas Restoration Act (H.R. 318) is a United States federal statute enacted by the 100th United States Congress and signed into law by President Ronald Reagan on August 18, 1987. It was a landmark legislative act that helped restore relations between tribes and the Federal government. It also reversed federal policy under the Indian Termination Era of the early and mid 1900's. This law restored the Federal trust relationships and Federal services and assistance to the tribes of the Ysleta del Sur Pueblo (also known as the Tiwa Indians) and the Alabama–Coushatta Tribe of Texas.

== Provisions of the Bill ==
The bill was split up into two Titles. Title I-Yselta del Sur Pueblo Restoration and Title II- Alabama and Coushata Tribes of Texas.

=== Title I- Yselta del Sur Pueblo Restoration ===
Sec. 103. lays out the restoration of the federal trust relationship between the United States government and the Ysleta sur Del Pueblo. It reestablished the laws granted by the United States to Indians under the Indian Reorganization Act of 1934. It also restored rights and privileges of the tribe under Federal treaty, statues, Executive order, or any other rights diminished by the Tiwa Indian Act. The last two provisions in the section restored federal services and benefits and effects on property rights and other Obligations.

Sec. 104. State and Tribal Authority

Sec. 105. Provision Relating to Tribal Reservations reestablished the reservation as a Federal Indian reservation.

Sec. 106. Tiwas Indians Act Repealed

Sec. 107. Gaming Activities stated that all gaming activities which are prohibited by the State laws of Texas are prohibited on the reservation.

Sec. 108 Tribal Membership

=== Title II- Alabama and Coushatta Indian Tribes of Texas ===
Sec. 202. Alabama and Coushatta Indian tribes of Texas Considered as one Tribe

Sec. 203. Restoration of the Federal Trust Relationship; Federal services and Assistance. The same provisions as Sec. 103.

Sec. 204. State and Tribal Authority

Sec. 205. Adoption of New Constitution and Bylaws

Sec. 206. Provisions Relating to Tribal Reservations

Sec. 207, Gaming Activities stated that all gaming activities which are prohibited by the State laws of Texas are prohibited on the reservation.

== Historical context ==
The United States had a change in their relationship with Native American Tribes starting in the 1950's. Under Indian termination policy it aimed at terminating federal supervision over American Indian Tribes. In 1953 Congress intended to use termination for Indians tribes in the states of Texas, California, Florida, and New York in House Concurrent Resolution 67 Stat. 108. This would lead to the termination of federal relationship of these tribes within these states and others. It would also terminate any Bureau of Indian Affairs offices in these states as well. This notion from Congress started off many other proceedings of termination for Indian Tribes. "From 1953 until 1970, Congress initiated 60 separate termination proceedings against American Indian tribes."

The tribes of the Ylseta del Sur Pueblo and the Alabama and Coushatta both lost Federal assistance in the early and mid 1900's. In 1954, the United States congress passed Pub. L. 83–627 Named "An Act to provide for the termination of Federal supervision over the property of the Alabama and Coushatta Tribes of Indians of Texas, and the individual members thereof, and for other purposes". This act terminated the federal trust and transferred all federal responsibilities to the State of Texas including tribal land and assets. It also made the tribes and their members ineligible for federal services or protections provided to recognized tribes. Under Pub. L. 90–287 of 1968 titled An Act Relating to The Tiwa Indians of Texas, the United States congress relinquished all responsibility of the Tiwa Indians of the Ysleta del Sur Puebulo Tribe and transferred it to the State of Texas. This made the tribe and its members ineligible for any services performed by the United States for Indians.

In 1975 Texas enacted Parks and Wildlife Code in which made legal frameworks to manage land and conservation of wildlife resources within the State of Texas. Some of the land that would be put under the Parks and Wildlife Code where part of the Alabama and Coushatta tribe. In response to this in 1983, Texas Attorney General Jim Mattox gave an opinion on whether the State would be able to control land that was designated to the reservation. In his opinion summary he concludes "To the extent the Texas Parks and Wildlife Department would otherwise be empowered to enforce provisions of the Texas Parks and Wildlife Code within the confines of the 'Alabama-Coushatta Indian Reservation,' it is not precluded from doing so by virtue of a claim that it is an 'Indian Reservation.'" Since the 1953 decision terminated federal control over the Alabama and Coushatta tribes their land was not seen as federally protected land but it is controlled by the state of Texas. To attend the concerns of the tribe Ron Coleman introduced his first iterations of the - Ysleta del Sur Pueblo and Alabama and Coushatta Indian Tribes of Texas Restoration Act to the 99th United States Congress in 1985. While this passed both the House and Senate it was returned to the Calendar in both 1985 and 1986.

== Procedural History ==
The Ysleta del Sur Pueblo and Alabama and Coushatta Indian Tribes of Texas Restoration Act was introduced to the House of Representatives by Congressman Ron Coleman and co-sponsored by Congressman Charlie Wilson on January 6, 1987. The bill was referred to the United States House Committee of Interior and Insular Affairs now known as United States House Committee on Natural Resources. It was passed with amendments by Voice vote on April 21, 1987. It was then received by the United States Senate on April 21, 1987 and referred to the Senate Committee on Indian Affairs. On June 26, 1987 the Senate Committee on Indian Affairs, Senator Daniel Inouye proposed an amendment in the nature of a substitute and an amendment to the title. With written report No. 100-90. The bill then was passed by the Senate with an amendment and an amendment to the Title by Voice Vote on July 23, 1987. The House Agreed to Senate Amendments by Unanimous consent on August 3, 1987. It was presented to the President Ronald Reagan on August 7, 1987, and signed into law on August 18, 1987.

== See also ==
Ysleta del Sur Pueblo v. Texas
