= Ysleta del Sur Pueblo v. Texas =

- Supreme Court of the United States

Argued February 22, 2022 Decided June 15, 2022
- Full case name: Ysleta del Sur Pueblo, Et al., Petitioners v. Texas
- Docket no.: 20-493

Holding
- The Restoration Act bans only forms of gambling explicitly banned within the State of Texas

Court membership
- Chief Justice John Roberts Associate Justices Clarence Thomas · Stephen Breyer; Samuel Alito · Sonia Sotomayor; Elena Kagan · Neil Gorsuch; Brett Kavanaugh · Amy Coney Barrett

Case opinions
- Majority: Gorsuch, joined by Breyer, Sotomayor, Kagan, Barrett
- Dissent: Roberts, joined by Thomas, Alito, Kavanaugh

Laws applied
- Ysleta del Sur Pueblo and Alabama and Coushatta Indian Tribes of Texas Restoration Act

Ysleta del Sur Pueblo v. Texas, 596 U.S. 685 (2022), was a United States Supreme Court case dealing with whether the state of Texas could control and regulate gambling on Texan Native American reservations. In a 5–4 decision issued in June 2022, the Court ruled that the Restoration Act bans only gaming activities also banned by the state of Texas.

== Background ==
During the period between 1968 and 1987, two of the three tribes of Texas- the Ysleta del Sur Pueblo and Alabama-Coushatta- were held under a trust with the state of Texas. After this relationship was subsequently rendered invalid by the Texas State Constitution, the tribes were transferred under the jurisdiction of the U.S. Government via the Restoration Act. During this time frame, the Ysleta del Sur Pueblo instituted a process of recreational electronic bingo despite the fact that the state of Texas only permitted the game for matters of Charity. Thus, conflict arose between two provisions within the Restoration Act. The first which barred gambling activity "prohibited" by state law while the second as having the statute not be a "grant of civil or criminal regulatory jurisdiction to the State of Texas". As such, The conflict focused on whether the "prohibition" of Gambling laws extends towards the regulation of gaming or whether the term references only games banned by the state. Initial holdings by the lower courts were largely sympathetic towards the State of Texas' reasoning, with the Fifth Circuit hearing the case after a state challenge against the Ysleta del Sur Pueblo for the use of Bingo games that failed to meet Texan regulatory laws.

== Supreme Court ==
The Ysleta del Sur Pueblo appealed to the Supreme Court following tribal opposition to the 5th Circuits interpretation of the Act. Oral Arguments were held on February 22, 2022, with the decision being put forth and released on June 15, 2022. The 5–4 decision, written by Justice Neil Gorsuch, stipulated that the provision that bars gambling "prohibited" by the state only covers forms of gambling outright banned by the state. In doing so he noted the differences between the terms 'prohibition' and 'regulation' stating that "to prohibit something means to ‘forbid,’ prevent,’ or ‘effectively stop’ it, or ‘make [it] impossible.’" In contrast, [...] 'to regulate something is usually understood to mean to ‘fix the time, amount, degree, or rate’ of an activity ‘according to rule[s].’". In addition to this reasoning, Gorsuch turned towards precedent and 'contextual clues' like those of California v. Cabazon Band of Mission Indians where the state could regulate gambling it outright prohibited, but not those that it gives conditions for. The dissent, written by Chief Justice John Roberts opposed the viewpoint presented in the majority opinion, instead stipulating that a "straightforward reading" made it clear that all gambling prohibited by the state is also barred on tribal land. Outside reactions to the decision included that of Ricky Sylestine, chair of the Alabama-Coushatta Tribe of Texas’ Tribal Council, who lauded the decision as "an affirmation of Tribal sovereignty and a victory for the Texas economy" though Gorsuch stipulated that "None of this is to say that the Tribe may offer gaming on whatever terms it wishes [...] Other gaming activities are subject to tribal regulation and must conform to the terms and conditions set forth in federal law."
