= The Future of Assisted Suicide and Euthanasia =

2006 book by Neil Gorsuch

- Author: Neil Gorsuch
- Language: English
- Publisher: Princeton University Press
- Publication date: 2006
- Publication place: United States
- Media type: Print
- Pages: 311
- ISBN: 0-691-14097-9
- OCLC: 644323498

The Future of Assisted Suicide and Euthanasia is a 2006 book by Neil Gorsuch. The book presents legal and moral arguments against euthanasia and assisted suicide, advocating for the retention of bans on the practices. It explores case histories from jurisdictions that have legalized the practice, including Oregon and the Netherlands. The Future of Assisted Suicide and Euthanasia grew out of Gorsuch's doctoral dissertation. While attending Oxford University, he studied legal and ethical issues related to assisted suicide and euthanasia under John Finnis, an Australian legal scholar opposed to assisted suicide.

== Contents ==
In The Future of Assisted Suicide and Euthanasia, Gorsuch treats physician-assisted suicide and euthanasia as morally identical acts. The scope of the book is limited to intentional killing by private persons, avoiding the complexities of considering the issue alongside the death penalty and warfare. In the book, Gorsuch rejects commonly held views about autonomy, arguing that states should sometimes place "paternalistic constraints on the choices of its citizens." He sharply criticizes Judge Richard Posner of the U.S. Court of Appeals for the Seventh Circuit, who wrote that government should not interfere with a person's decision to end their life. Gorsuch argues that Posner's view could require the legalization of consensual homicide and would lead to mass suicide pacts, duels, and organ sales. Gorsuch further characterized assisted suicide as, "essentially a right to consensual homicide." He said that the U.S. should "retain existing law [banning assisted suicide and euthanasia] on the basis that human life is fundamentally and inherently valuable, and that the intentional taking of human life by private persons is always wrong."

== Accusation of plagiarism ==
On April 4, 2017, BuzzFeed and Politico ran articles highlighting similar language occurring in The Future of Assisted Suicide and Euthanasia and an earlier law review article by Abigail Lawlis Kuzma, Indiana's deputy attorney general. Academic experts contacted by Politico "differed in their assessment of what Gorsuch did, ranging from calling it a clear impropriety to mere sloppiness."

Gorsuch's advisor at Oxford, John Finnis, stated, "The allegation is entirely without foundation. The book is meticulous in its citation of primary sources. The allegation that the book is guilty of plagiarism because it does not cite secondary sources which draw on those same primary sources is, frankly, absurd." Kuzma stated, "I have reviewed both passages and do not see an issue here, even though the language is similar. These passages are factual, not analytical in nature, framing both the technical legal and medical circumstances of the 'Baby/Infant Doe' case that occurred in 1982." Noah Feldman, a Harvard Law professor, thought that Gorsuch had committed "minor plagiarism" that deserved "no more punishment than the embarrassment attendant on its revelation."

== See also ==
- Assisted suicide in the United States
