= Baby Doe Law =

1984 addition to US law

Child Abuse Amendments of 1984
- Other short titles: Child Abuse Amendments of 1983; Child Abuse Prevention and Treatment and Adoption Reform Act Amendments of 1983
- Long title: An act to extend and improve provisions of laws relating to child abuse and neglect and adoption, and for other purposes.
- Nicknames: Baby Doe Law; Baby Doe Amendment
- Enacted by: the 98th United States Congress
- Effective: October 9, 1984

Citations
- Public law: Pub. L. 98–457
- Statutes at Large: 98 Stat. 1749

Codification
- U.S.C. sections amended: 42 U.S.C. §§ 5102, 5103, 5103(b)(2), 5104

Legislative history
- Introduced in the House as H.R. 1904 by Austin Murphy (D‑PA 22nd), John Erlenborn (R‑IL 13th), Mario Biaggi (D‑NY 19th), Steve Bartlett (R‑TX 3rd), Paul Simon (D‑IL 22nd), James Jeffords (R‑VT AL), George Miller (D‑CA 7th), William Goodling (R‑PA 19th), Baltasar Corrada (I‑PR AL), Steve Gunderson (R‑WI 3rd), Joseph Gaydos (D‑PA 20th), Pat Williams (D‑MT 1st) on March 3, 1983; Committee consideration by House – Education and Labor; Passed the House on February 2, 1984 (396-4); Passed the Senate on July 26, 1984 (89-0); Reported by the joint conference committee on September 19, 1984; agreed to by the House on September 26, 1984 (voice vote) and by the Senate on September 28, 1984 (voice vote); Signed into law by President Ronald Reagan on October 9, 1984

The Baby Doe Law or Baby Doe Amendment is an amendment to the Child Abuse Prevention and Treatment Act of 1974, passed in 1984, that sets forth specific criteria and guidelines for the treatment of disabled newborns in the United States, regardless of the wishes of the parents.

== Details of the law ==
The Baby Doe Law mandates that states receiving federal money for child abuse programs develop procedures to report medical neglect, which the law defines as the withholding of treatment unless a baby is irreversibly comatose or the treatment for the newborn's survival is "virtually futile." Assessments of a child's quality of life are not valid reasons for withholding medical care.

== Background of the law ==
The law came about as a result of several widely publicized cases involving the deaths of disabled newborns. The parents of these children withheld standard medical treatment for correctable gastrointestinal birth defects, sometimes leading to their deaths.

=== Baby Doe ===
In 1982 a baby known as "Baby Doe" was born in Bloomington, Indiana, with Down syndrome and a birth defect requiring surgery. The parents refused the surgery because of the child's Down syndrome. Hospital officials had a guardian appointed by the Indiana Juvenile Court to determine whether the surgery should be done. The court ruled in favor of the parents (and thus against the surgery), and the Indiana Supreme Court refused to hear the case. The baby died later in 1982. Due to the baby's death (mootness) there could be no appeal to the Supreme Court.

=== Baby Jane Doe ===
A somewhat similar situation in 1983 involving a "Baby Jane Doe" again brought the issue of withholding treatment for newborns with disabilities to public attention. In this case, the parents and doctors had decided not to perform surgery on a baby with a birth defect affecting the spine and brain.

Baby Jane Doe was born on October 11, 1983, in Long Island, NY, with an open spinal column (meningomyelocele), hydrocephaly and microcephaly. Surgical closure of the defect and reduction of fluid from her brain was expected to prolong her life – perhaps extending her life from age 2 without the surgery, to age 20 with it – but she was still expected to be bedridden and paralyzed, to have epilepsy and kidney damage, and to have severe brain damage. The parents, who were Roman Catholic Christians, consulted medical specialists, clergy, and social workers to decide what to do. They chose conservative management with nutrition, antibiotics, and bandages, rather than invasive surgery to close the hole in her spine.

Vermont attorney and right-to-life advocate Lawrence Washburn brought suit in New York to obtain guardianship and an order to have the surgery performed. After an initial win in court, in which a justice of the New York Supreme Court found that her life was in "imminent danger", another person was appointed as her guardian, and the surgery was ordered, Washburn lost his case on appeal. He then filed another in federal court. The parents, at this point, had accumulated tens of thousands of dollars in legal debts.

Also, the Department of Health and Human Services (HHS) received a complaint that Baby Jane Doe was being denied aggressive medical treatment. The HHS referred the case to New York's Child Protective Services, which on November 7 found no merit to the complaint. The HHS also obtained copies of the infant's medical records for her first week of life, which were reviewed by Koop, who stated that he did not see anything in the record that would exclude the child from surgery. HHS took the stance that Baby Jane Doe was being discriminated against due to her medical conditions and mental disability. HHS repeatedly requested copies of the infant's medical records (past October 19) under section 504 of the Rehabilitation Act of 1973.

In early November, HHS brought suit against the hospital to the US District Court. The court concluded that the hospital was not in violation of section 504, and that the hospital treatment plan for the infant was based on the parents' decision to withhold surgery, not on discrimination. The court also found the parents' decision was "reasonable" based on the "medical options available and genuine concern for the best interests of the child." The Court of Appeals ruled that the Rehabilitation Act did not give HHS any ability to interfere with the "treatment decisions involving defective newborn infants".

During the protracted court battles, Baby Jane's parents consented to some surgery for their daughter. The hole in her spine closed naturally, without surgery. Baby Jane survived beyond anyone's expectations. She has intellectual and other disabilities, such as kidney damage and the need to use a wheelchair, but she can speak and currently lives in a group home. She celebrated her 30th birthday with her family in 2013.

== The Baby Doe Laws ==
In January 1984, the government issued Baby Doe regulations whereby if parents refused treatment for their infants with congenital defects, Infant Care Review Committees were required to advise the hospital to alert the courts or a child protective agency. In 1986, those regulations were struck down by the U.S. Supreme Court in the case Bowen v. American Hospital Association (AHA), et al., on the grounds that the autonomy of the states had been violated and that the Rehabilitation Act of 1973 did not apply to the medical care of disabled infants.

However, on October 9, 1984, the final Baby Doe law, known as the Baby Doe Amendment, amended the Child Abuse Prevention and Treatment Act of 1974 to include the withholding of fluids, food, and medically indicated treatment from disabled newborns. This law went into effect on June 1, 1985, and is still in effect.

=== Actual text of the current Baby Doe Law ===
The following text is found under the eligibility requirements for federal funding in U.S.C.A. TITLE 42, CHAPTER 67, Sec. 5106a. Grants to States for child abuse and neglect prevention and treatment programs:

(B) an assurance that the State has in place procedures for responding to the reporting of medical neglect (including instances of withholding of medically indicated treatment from disabled infants with life-threatening conditions), procedures or programs, or both (within the State child protective services system), to provide for--

(i) coordination and consultation with individuals designated by and within appropriate health-care facilities;
(ii) prompt notification by individuals designated by and within appropriate health-care facilities of cases of suspected medical neglect (including instances of withholding of medically indicated treatment from disabled infants with life-threatening conditions); and
(iii) authority, under State law, for the State child protective services system to pursue any legal remedies, including the authority to initiate legal proceedings in a court of competent jurisdiction, as may be necessary to prevent the withholding of medically indicated treatment from disabled infants with life threatening conditions;

== See also ==
- Born-Alive Infants Protection Act
- Meltdown (album) – Christian artist Steve Taylor wrote a song entitled "Baby Doe" in 1984 in response to the Baby Doe incidents.
- Baby K
