= Government Performance Coalition =

The Government Performance Coalition was created in 1999 by a group of organizations and researchers with the goal of presenting the president of the United States, government managers, Congress, the media, and the public views on the improvement of government management. The coalition maintains that it seeks to ensure a continued focus and attention to performance and management issues and to identify existing issues that need new attention, and refine past efforts and highlight related governance policies that affect performance. The Coalition, comprising nearly two dozen organizations, meets regularly in Washington, D.C. to serve as a clearinghouse for its individual members’ respective agendas regarding government management improvement. During presidential election years, the Coalition sponsors events to highlight the importance of good government management issues in the campaign and to prepare materials that would be helpful to the winning candidate's incoming political appointees.

== Resource development ==
The Coalition was initially formed to develop resource materials to support the eventual winner of the 2000 presidential campaign. In that effort, it sponsored a series of forums on key management issues, such as human capital, financial management, and performance management. These forums and associated recommendations were compiled into a report given to the incoming administration for President George W. Bush. In a memorandum dated December 20, 2000, the coalition identified critical issues that require new policy directions such as the high-risk areas in the General Accounting Office (e.g. FAA, DOD financial management, Medicare, HUD, student aid, superfund, NASA). Many of the recommendations were subsequently used to frame his President's Management Agenda.

In 2008, the Coalition members, both individually and collectively, sponsored a series of forums in 2008 with recommendations to the incoming Obama Administration to place an appropriate emphasis on performance. It recommended three broad initiatives: 1) implement a performance-based framework at agencies; 2) invest more in federal human resources; and, 3) mandate the use of innovation and technology to revolutionize government. Barack Obama's fiscal year 2010 budget has a section titled “Building a High-Performance Government,” with its first item being “Putting Performance First.”

== Projects ==
The Coalition members jointly sponsored the publication of a book as part of the 2004 presidential transition. That book, “Getting Results: A Guide for Federal Leaders and Managers” was an orientation guide provided to incoming political appointees to help them be successful managers in the federal government. The coalition, through the Performance Institute, also trains thousands of government managers every year on performance-based topics as well as methodologies and best practices for transparency and citizen services.

A February 2009 article in Government Executive magazine described the Coalition as “An unfunded organization with no professional staff, the coalition is run through the volunteer efforts of good government group leaders. Early in the Bush administration, the coalition received some funding for a joint book project on performance management advice, but it now operates primarily as a clearinghouse for its member organizations' efforts.” The article continues: “The loose structure isn't just a vehicle for agreement at the coalition. It's a requirement. Because of the variety of governance structures among the member groups, it's impossible for them all to commit to a concerted lobbying campaign or even formally endorse a program.”

== Members of the Government Performance Coalition ==
The members of Government Performance Coalition include: American Society for Public Administration, Association of Government Accountants, Cisco Internet Business Solutions Group, The Public Sector Consortium, CNA Corporation, Coalition for Effective Change, Trachtenberg School of Public Policy and Public Administration at George Washington University, Grant Thornton, IBM Center for The Business of Government, International Brotherhood of Teamsters, American University Institute for the Study of Policy Implementation, Management Concepts, Mercatus Center at George Mason University, National Academy of Public Administration (United States), Partnership for Public Service, The Performance Institute, and Senior Executives Association.

== See also ==
- Good government organizations in the United States
