= Valerie Purdie Greenaway =

American social psychologist

- Born: Valerie Joyce Purdie
- Other name: Valerie Purdie-Vaughns
- Education: Columbia University (BA); Stanford University (PhD)
- Spouse: Joseph A. Greenaway Jr.
- Scientific career
- Fields: Social Psychology
- Workplaces: Columbia University
- Thesis: Identity Contingency Threat: The Impact of Circumstantial Cues on African-Americans’ trust in diversity settings (2004)
- Doctoral advisor: Claude Steele
- Website: psychology.columbia.edu/content/valerie-purdie-greenaway

Valerie Purdie Greenaway, who has also published under the surnames Purdie-Vaughns and Purdie, is an American social psychologist and associate professor of psychology at Columbia University. Her research interests include diversity, stereotypes and intergroup relations. She is one of the first African Americans to receive tenure in the academic sciences at Columbia University, and is credited with coining the term "intersectional invisibility".

== Education and career ==
Purdie Greenaway grew up in Brentwood, New York. She attended Columbia College for her undergraduate education, where she also played varsity basketball. After finishing at Columbia in 1993, she spent a few years working at the I Have A Dream Foundation, where she worked on summer camp programs and mentoring for underserved third grade students. An interest in better tracking her students' progress led her back towards psychology, and she spent three years working as the lab manager for Geraldine Downey. She then went on to receive her PhD from Stanford University in 2004, studying under Claude Steele. Her thesis was titled Identity Contingency Threat: The Impact of Circumstantial Cues on African-Americans’ trust in diversity settings.

Upon completing her PhD program, Purdie Greenaway accepted a position at Yale University as psychology faculty. She worked there as an assistant professor until 2009. She then started a position at Columbia University, eventually becoming an associate professor and director of a laboratory group in the psychology department in 2014.

Purdie Greenaway was also a research fellow for Columbia's Institute for Research on African-American Studies. She served as core faculty for the Robert Wood Johnson Health & Society Scholars Program, which was discontinued in February 2017.

== Research ==
Purdie Greenaway's laboratory group uses an interdisciplinary approach to study a wide range of topics that assess how social groups and human behavior interact. Some of the lab's research topics include social identity threat, dialogues regarding historic injustice, and racial health disparities.

=== Intersectional invisibility ===
Purdie Greenaway's article with Richard P. Eibach, "Intersectional Invisibility: The Distinctive Advantages and Disadvantages of Multiple Subordinate-Group Identities", has been cited over 850 times, according to Google Scholar. This article is significant for giving name to the psychological concept of intersectional invisibility. This concept posits that individuals with multiple subordinate-group or non-prototypical identities tend to be overlooked. The subordinate-group member is rendered invisible through mechanisms such as historical narratives, cultural understandings, interest group politics, and legal frameworks. Researchers give an example of African-American women; Because they do not fit the prototype of their subordinate group identities (white and male), they experience "intersectional invisibility" (378). Purdie Greenaway and Eibach wanted to move away from the notion that one group suffers more than others and instead gain a better understanding of how an individual's identities interact to inform their whole experience. Their theory borrows from previous literature regarding "double jeopardy" which refers to the disadvantages associated with individuals who are part of more than one subordinate group.

=== Seeing Black ===
In 2004, Purdie Greenaway along with Jennifer Eberhardt, Phillip Goff and Paul Davies published "Seeing Black: Race, Crime, and Visual Processing" in the Journal of Personality and Social Psychology. Researchers conducted five studies to determine how salience to stereotypes might affect visual processing for their sample of both police officers and civilians. Previous literature has demonstrated how racial bias affects participants' judgement-making processes, specifically relating Blacks with crime (876). In the present study, researchers found a bidirectional association between criminality and Blacks. Studying the effects of such associations can prove helpful in eliminating racial profiling and improving police officer and civilian interactions.

=== Status-based rejection model ===
In 2002, Purdie Greenaway and colleagues proposed a model of status-based rejection and its implications in their journal article, "Sensitivity to Status-Based Rejection: Implications for African American Students’ College Experience." The concept of rejection sensitivity was developed by another team of researchers to indicate how rejection can influence an individual's relationships with others. Purdie Greenaway and her colleagues looked at this cognitive process as it relates to African Americans attending predominantly White educational institutions. The first two studies conducted were to effectively develop a questionnaire that measures the construct of race-based rejection sensitivity. The RS–Race Questionnaire (RSQ–Race) for African Americans has subsequently been used in other psychological literature as a measure of racial expectations and beliefs. The third study utilized the questionnaire with a sample of African American college students. Their results indicated that higher levels of rejection sensitivity were related to perceiving a negative race-related experience or NRE. The findings of this research can be instrumental for African American college students' academic success and overall well-being.

== Selected publications ==
- Mendoza-Denton, Rodolfo; Downey, Geraldine; Purdie, Valerie J.; Davis, Angelina; Pietrzak, Janina (2002). "Sensitivity to status-based rejection: Implications for African American students' college experience". Journal of Personality and Social Psychology. 83 (4): 896–918. doi:10.1037/0022-3514.83.4.896. ISSN 0022-3514. PMID 12374443.
- Eberhardt, Jennifer L.; Goff, Phillip Atiba; Purdie, Valerie J.; Davies, Paul G. (2004). "Seeing Black: Race, Crime, and Visual Processing". Journal of Personality and Social Psychology. 87 (6): 876–893. doi:10.1037/0022-3514.87.6.876. ISSN 1939-1315. PMID 15598112. S2CID 6322610.
- Eberhardt, Jennifer L.; Davies, Paul G.; Purdie-Vaughns, Valerie J.; Johnson, Sheri Lynn (May 1, 2006). "Looking Deathworthy: Perceived Stereotypicality of Black Defendants Predicts Capital-Sentencing Outcomes". Psychological Science. 17 (5): 383–386. doi:10.1111/j.1467-9280.2006.01716.x. ISSN 0956-7976. PMID 16683924. S2CID 15737940.
- Purdie-Vaughns, Valerie; Eibach, Richard P. (September 1, 2008). "Intersectional Invisibility: The Distinctive Advantages and Disadvantages of Multiple Subordinate-Group Identities". Sex Roles. 59 (5–6): 377–391. doi:10.1007/s11199-008-9424-4. ISSN 0360-0025. S2CID 35469591.
- Cohen, G. L.; Garcia, J.; Purdie-Vaughns, V.; Apfel, N.; Brzustoski, P. (April 17, 2009). "Recursive Processes in Self-Affirmation: Intervening to Close the Minority Achievement Gap". Science. 324 (5925): 400–403. Bibcode:2009Sci...324..400C. doi:10.1126/science.1170769. ISSN 0036-8075. PMID 19372432. S2CID 18180652.

== Impact ==
Purdie Greenaway's work extends well outside the boundaries of academic scholarship. She has consulted for corporations such as Ernst & Young and nonprofit organizations such as Teach for America. In 2018, she presented at the Tory Burch Foundation's first Embrace Ambition Summit.

== Personal life ==
Greenaway is married to former United States Circuit Judge Joseph A. Greenaway Jr.
