= Florence Y. Pan =

American judge (born 1966)

Florence Pan
- 潘愉
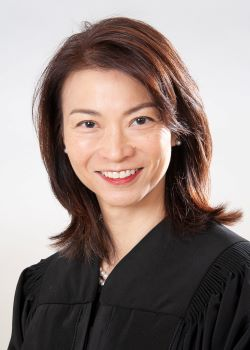
- Pan in 2021

Judge of the United States Court of Appeals for the District of Columbia Circuit
- Incumbent
- Assumed office September 26, 2022
- Appointed by: Joe Biden
- Preceded by: Ketanji Brown Jackson

Judge of the United States District Court for the District of Columbia
- In office September 23, 2021 – September 28, 2022
- Appointed by: Joe Biden
- Preceded by: Ketanji Brown Jackson
- Succeeded by: Sparkle L. Sooknanan

Associate Judge of the Superior Court of the District of Columbia
- In office June 8, 2009 – September 23, 2021
- Appointed by: Barack Obama
- Preceded by: Linda Turner Hamilton
- Succeeded by: Carl Ezekiel Ross

Personal details
- Born: 1966 (age 59–60) New York City, New York, U.S.
- Spouse: Max Stier (m. 2004)
- Education: University of Pennsylvania (BA, BS); Stanford University (JD)

Chinese name
- Chinese: 潘愉
Transcriptions
Standard Mandarin
- Hanyu Pinyin: Pān Yú
- Bopomofo: ㄆㄢㄩˊ

Florence Yu Pan (Chinese: 潘愉; pinyin: Pān Yú; born 1966) is an American lawyer who serves as a United States circuit judge of the United States Court of Appeals for the District of Columbia Circuit. She was a United States district judge of the United States District Court for the District of Columbia from 2021 to 2022 and a judge of the Superior Court of the District of Columbia from 2009 to 2021.

== Early life and education ==
Pan was born in 1966 to a Taiwanese American family in New York City. Her parents had immigrated to the United States from Taiwan in 1961. Her father is Wu-Ching Pan, and her mother is Felicia D. Pan. She grew up in Tenafly, New Jersey.

Pan attended the Wharton School of the University of Pennsylvania, graduating in 1988 with a Bachelor of Arts and a Bachelor of Science degree, summa cum laude. From 1988 to 1990, Pan worked for Goldman Sachs as a financial analyst. She then attended Stanford Law School, where she was an editor of the Stanford Law Review and the Stanford Law and Policy Review and was a finalist in the school's moot court competition. She graduated in 1993 with a Juris Doctor with distinction.

== Career ==
After graduating from law school, Pan was a law clerk for Judge Michael Mukasey of the United States District Court for the Southern District of New York from 1993 to 1994 and for Judge Ralph K. Winter Jr. of the United States Court of Appeals for the Second Circuit from 1994 to 1995.

Pan worked for the United States Department of Justice as a Bristow Fellow in the Office of the Solicitor General from 1995 to 1996 and then as an attorney in the Appellate Section of the Criminal Division from 1996 to 1998. She next worked at the United States Department of Treasury, first as a senior advisor to the assistant secretary for financial markets in 1998 and subsequently as a senior advisor to the undersecretary for domestic finance in 1999.

From 1999 to 2009, she served as an assistant United States attorney in the United States Attorney's Office for the District of Columbia, where she also served as deputy chief of the Appellate Section from 2007 to 2009.

From 2007 to 2008, she was an adjunct professor at American University Washington College of Law and since 2012, she has been an adjunct professor at Georgetown University Law Center.

== Judicial service ==
=== Superior Court of the District of Columbia service ===
On March 24, 2009, President Barack Obama nominated Pan to serve as an associate judge on the Superior Court of the District of Columbia. Pan was confirmed by voice vote on May 21, 2009, and sworn in on June 8 of that year. She remained on the court until her confirmation to the United States District Court for the District of Columbia in 2021.

=== Expired nomination to United States district court under Obama ===
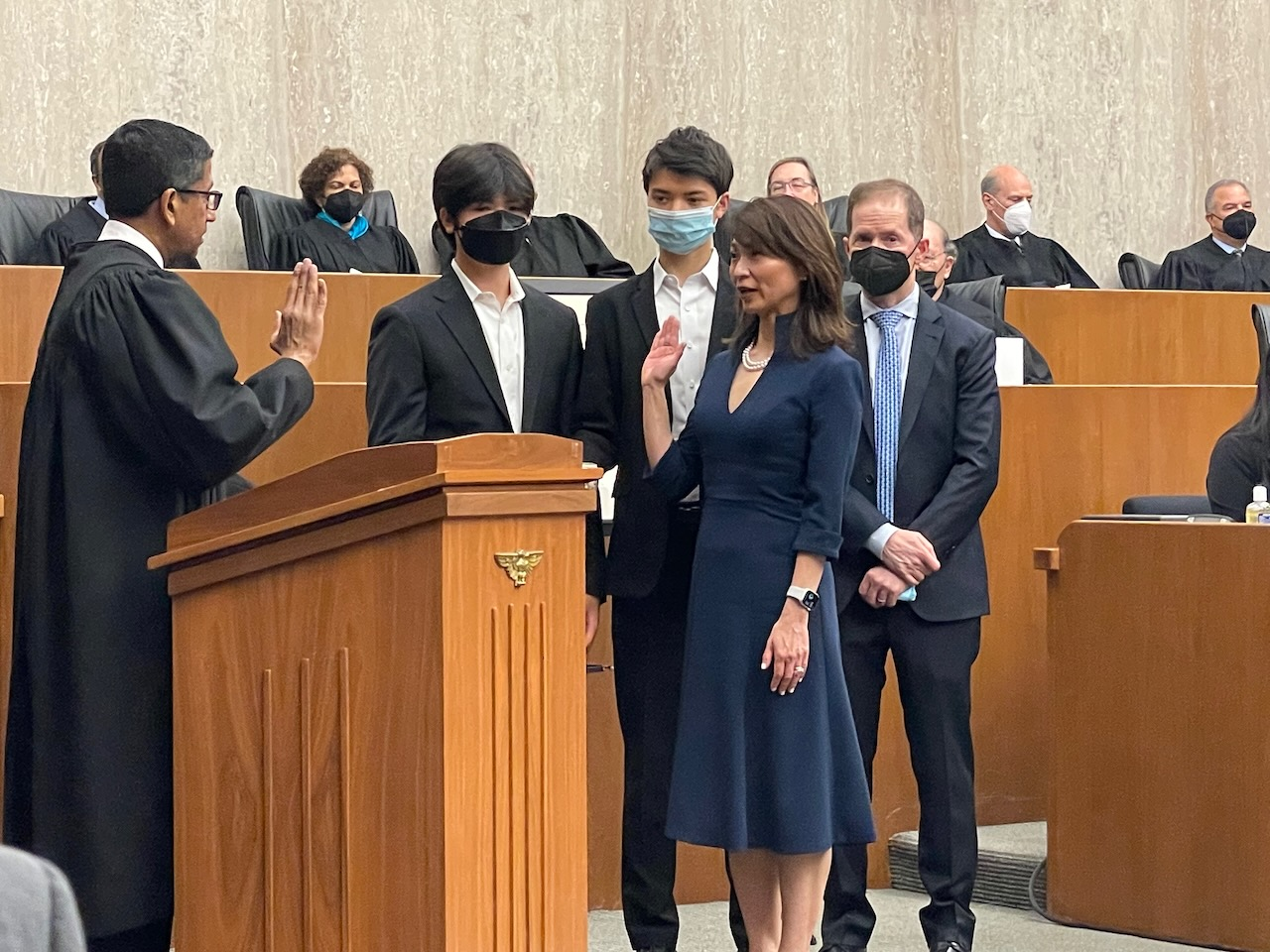
Chief Judge Sri Srinivasan administers the oath of office to Judge Pan at her ceremonial investiture for the United States District Court for the District of Columbia

On April 28, 2016, President Barack Obama nominated Pan to serve as a United States district judge for the District of Columbia, to the seat vacated by Judge Reggie Walton, who assumed senior status on December 31, 2015. On July 13, 2016, a hearing on her nomination was held before the Senate Judiciary Committee. On September 15, 2016, her nomination was favorably reported by the committee by voice vote. Her nomination expired on January 3, 2017, with the end of the 114th Congress.

=== Renomination to United States district court under Biden ===
On March 30, 2021, President Joe Biden announced his intent to nominate Pan to serve as a United States district judge for the District of Columbia. On June 15, 2021, her nomination was sent to the Senate. President Biden nominated Pan to the seat vacated by Judge Ketanji Brown Jackson, who was nominated to serve as a circuit judge for the United States Court of Appeals for the District of Columbia Circuit. On July 14, 2021, a hearing on her nomination was held before the Senate Judiciary Committee. On August 5, 2021, her nomination was favorably reported by the committee by a 18–4 vote. On September 20, 2021, Majority Leader Chuck Schumer filed cloture on her nomination. On September 22, 2021, the United States Senate invoked cloture on her nomination by a 66–27 vote. On September 23, 2021, her nomination was confirmed by a 68–30 vote. She received her judicial commission the same day. She is the first Asian American woman to serve on the United States District Court for the District of Columbia. Her service as a district judge was terminated on September 28, 2022, when she was elevated to the court of appeals.

=== Court of appeals service ===
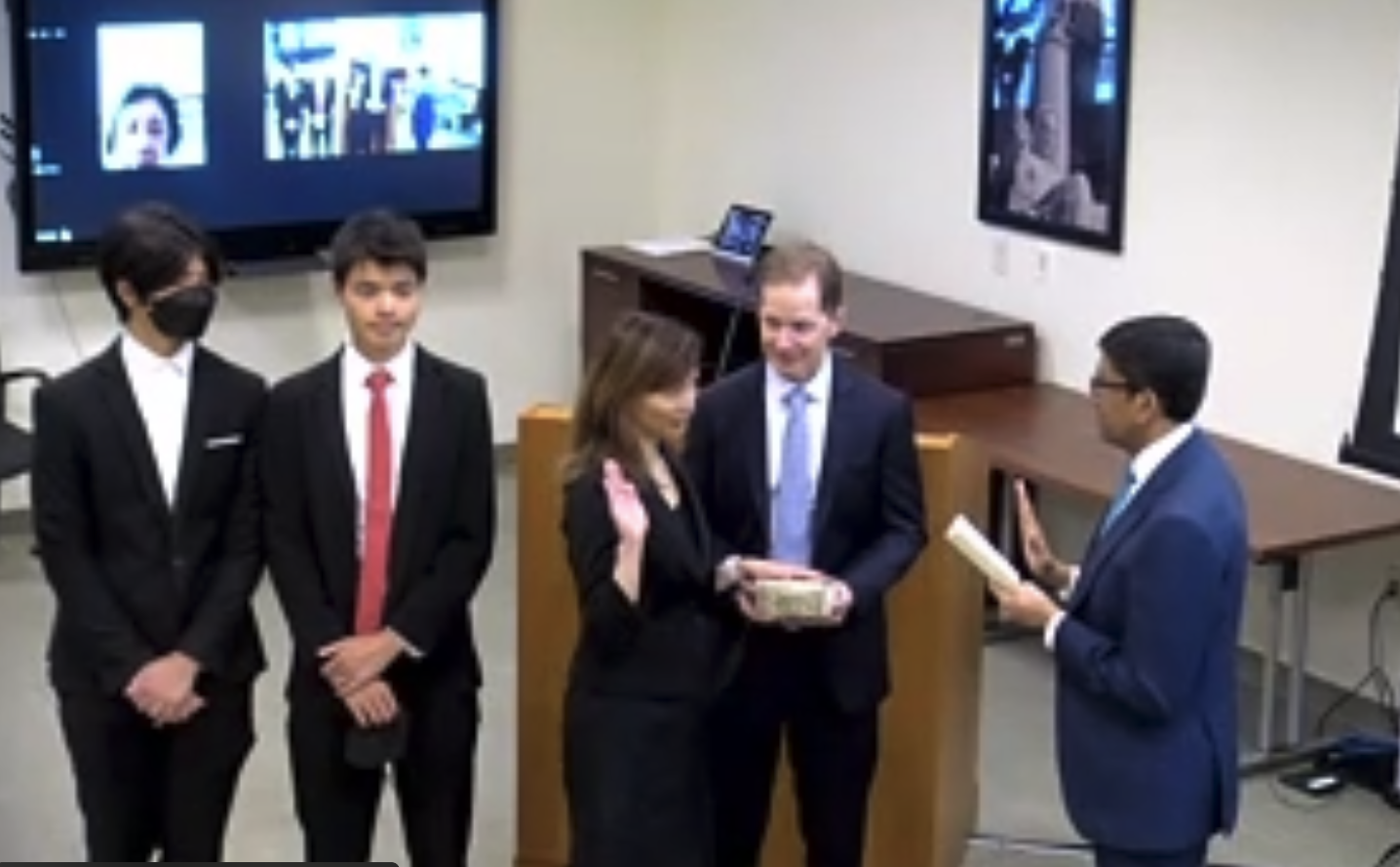
On September 28, 2022, Chief Judge Sri Srinivasan of the United States Court of Appeals for the District of Columbia Circuit administers the oath of office to Pan at her swearing-in ceremony for the United States Court of Appeals for the District of Columbia Circuit.

On May 25, 2022, President Joe Biden nominated Pan to serve as a United States circuit judge for the United States Court of Appeals for the District of Columbia Circuit. She was nominated to the seat being vacated by Judge Ketanji Brown Jackson, who was elevated to the Supreme Court of the United States. A hearing on her nomination was held before the Senate Judiciary Committee on June 22, 2022. On July 21, 2022, her nomination was favorably reported by the committee by a 13–9 vote. On September 15, 2022, Majority Leader Chuck Schumer filed cloture on her nomination. On September 19, 2022, the Senate invoked cloture on her nomination by a 52–38 vote. On September 20, 2022, her nomination was confirmed by a 52–42 vote. She received her judicial commission on September 26, 2022. She is the first Chinese American to serve on the United States Court of Appeals for the District of Columbia Circuit.

==== Notable rulings ====
In the 2024 case United States of America v. Donald J. Trump, Judge Pan and two others presided over a federal appeals case that rejected Donald Trump's claim of absolute presidential immunity. During the January 2024 hearing, she challenged the Trump counsel's legal argument by posing a hypothetical scenario in which a president could order an assassination of a political rival and still be immune from prosecution. The Supreme Court overturned the circuit court's ruling and held that the president has immunity for official acts.

== Personal life ==
In 2004, Pan married attorney Max Stier, whom she met at Stanford Law School and who serves as the president and CEO of the Partnership for Public Service, at the Embassy of New Zealand in Washington, D.C. They have two sons.

== See also ==
- List of Asian American jurists

Legal offices
Preceded by Linda Turner Hamilton	Judge of the Superior Court of the District of Columbia; 2009–2021	Succeeded by Carl Ezekiel Ross
Preceded by Ketanji Brown Jackson	Judge of the United States District Court for the District of Columbia; 2021–2022	Succeeded by Sparkle L. Sooknanan
Preceded by Ketanji Brown Jackson	Judge of the United States Court of Appeals for the District of Columbia Circuit; 2022–present	Incumbent
