= Lambright =

Lambright is a surname. Notable people with the surname include:

- James H. Lambright, American banker
- Jim Lambright (1942–2020), American football player and coach
- Maxie Lambright (1924–1980), American football player and coach
- Horace Lambright, fictional character
- W. Henry Lambright, American professor of Public Administration
- Wayne Lambright, An American politician.
