= W. Henry Lambright =

American public policy academic

- Born: July 9, 1939 (age 87); Baltimore, Maryland
- Education: Columbia University; Johns Hopkins University
- Awards: Fellow of the American Association for the Advancement of Science (2004)
- Scientific career
- Fields: Science and Space policy Environmental policy and administration
- Workplaces: Syracuse University
- Thesis: NASA and the Politics of Patents: a Study of Administrative Pluralism (1966)
- Website: Official Website

William Henry "Harry" Lambright (born 1939) is a professor of Public Administration, International Affairs and Political Science at the Maxwell School of Citizenship and Public Affairs of Syracuse University.

He is the director of the Science and Technology Policy Program of the Center for Environmental Policy and Administration since 1995 and a Senior Research Associate at the Campbell Public Affairs Institute.

== Early life and education ==
Lambright was born on July 9, 1939, in Baltimore, Maryland to William Henry Lambright and Nellie Mae Lambright (née: Brown). He graduated with an AB degree from Johns Hopkins University in 1961. In 1966, he earned a master's degree and a PhD at Columbia University. His thesis dealt with NASA and the politics of patents.

== Career ==
In 1966, Lambright joined the Maxwell School of Citizenship and Public Affairs at Syracuse University, where he became full professor in 1976. He completed 55 years of service in 2021. He also held occasional positions at SUNY College of Environmental Science and Forestry and Cornell University.

Lambright has served as a guest scholar at the Brookings Institution (1965-1966); Special Assistant to the Office of University Affairs at NASA (1970); and as the director of the Science and Technology Policy Center at the Syracuse Research Corporation (1972-1994).

Lambright's research focuses on federal policy-making in the fields of space technology, national security, ecosystem management, biotechnology, space-exploration, transboundary issues, and science and policy integration. He has been interviewed by the media on variety of topics, including the environment, space science and technology, and government management.

== Awards ==
Lambright became a fellow of the American Association for the Advancement of Science (AAAS) in 2004 for "his distinguished contributions to the field of science and technology policy, including issues involving space, environment, and transfer technology".

He was elected a fellow of National Academy of Public Administration in 2012. He is also a member of American Political Science Association, American Society for Public Administration (executive committee for public administration since 1987).

== Works ==
Lambright has authored over 275 articles, papers, and reports and has written or edited eight books.

- Lambright, W. Henry (2014). Why Mars: NASA and the Politics of Space Exploration. Baltimore: JHU Press. doi:10.1353/book.30865. ISBN 9781421412795. OCLC 922849332.
- Lambright, W. Henry (1998). Powering Apollo: James E. Webb of NASA. Baltimore: JHU Press. doi:10.56021/9780801849022. ISBN 9780801862052. OCLC 1127798130.
- Space Policy in the 21st Century. Baltimore: JHU Press. 2003. ISBN 9780801870682. OCLC 48675630.
- Launching a New Mission: Michael Griffin and NASA's Return to the Moon (Report). IBM Center for The Business of Government. 2009.

== See also ==
- Space policy
- IBM Center for The Business of Government
