= Lawrence A. Cunningham =

American scholar

Lawrence A. Cunningham (born July 10, 1962) is an American corporate director and advisor, author, professor and lawyer. The Director of the John L. Weinberg Center for Corporate Governance at the University of Delaware, he is also the founder and managing partner of the Quality Shareholders Group and special counsel with an international law firm. Cunningham is best known as an expert on corporate governance. He is also known for his knowledge of the history and corporate culture of Berkshire Hathaway and Warren Buffett. He has served on the board of directors of many companies, including Constellation Software, Kelly Group Partners, and Markel Group.

== Early life ==
Cunningham's father died when Cunningham was 13. He then enrolled in Girard College, a high school in Philadelphia, Pennsylvania for "poor orphans." He worked full-time to put himself through his home-state school, University of Delaware, graduating with a Bachelor of Arts in economics. He then attended and graduated from the Benjamin N. Cardozo School of Law of Yeshiva University with a JD degree magna cum laude in 1988.

== Career ==
From 1988 to 1994, Cunningham practiced corporate law with Cravath, Swaine & Moore, specializing in corporate governance, corporate finance and M&A.

From 1994 to 2002, he taught at the Cardozo School of Law, where he directed The Samuel and Ronnie Heyman Center on Corporate Governance, and wrote several books on value investing. From 2002 to 2007, he was professor of law and business and vice dean at Boston College.

From 2007 to 2022, he was the Henry St. George Tucker III Research Professor at George Washington University where he founded and for many years ran GW in New York (a training program for GW Law School students interested in business law) and the Quality Shareholders Initiative (now organized as a consulting firm, Quality Shareholders Group).

Cunningham is a director of Constellation Software Inc. (TSX) and since 2019, its vice chairman. Cunningham is also a director of Markel Group (NYSE) and Kelly Partners Group (ASX).

=== Honors ===
Two of Cunningham's books have been named outstanding titles of the year by the American Library Association: Berkshire Beyond Buffett (Columbia U. Press 2015) and Contracts in the Real World (Cambridge U. Press 2013).

In 2018, Cunningham received the B. Kenneth West Lifetime Achievement Award from the National Association of Corporate Directors (NACD), in recognition of his board service, board advice, and research on corporate governance.

In 2023, Cunningham delivered the 37th Annual Pileggi Distinguished Lecture to the bench and bar of Delaware and to the faculty and students of Delaware Law School. In 2024, he delivered the Annual Weinberg Distinguished Lecture at the University of Delaware.

== Selected publications ==
Cunningham has done work for the Securities Investor Protection Corp. (SIPC) and Public Company Accounting Oversight Board, as well as writing popular accounts of AIG and Berkshire Hathaway. He also wrote several influential books on investing, including quality investing (about governance as stewardship for shareholders). He writes a regular column for MarketWatch, Cunningham's Quality Investing. He has written or edited about 50 scholarly articles, including articles in law reviews, and published a dozen books. His textbook on accounting is the standard teaching book in US law schools.

- Buffett, Warren (1996–2022). The Essays of Warren Buffett: Lessons for Corporate America. Carolina Academic Press. ISBN 978-1611637588.
- The AIG Story (with Hank Greenberg). Wiley. 2013. ISBN 978-1-1183-4587-0.
- Berkshire Beyond Buffett: The Enduring Value of Values. Columbia University Press. 2014. ISBN 978-0231170048.
- Quality Investing. Harriman House. 2015.
- The Warren Buffett Shareholder. Harriman House. 2018.
- Margin of Trust: The Berkshire Business Model. Columbia University Press. 2020.
- Dear Shareholder: The Best Executive Letters. Harriman House. 2020.
- Quality Shareholders. Columbia University Press. 2020.
- Editor, John L. Weinberg's 1948 Princeton Thesis "Status and Functions of Corporate Directors."
