= Daniel Carpenter =

Daniel Carpenter may refer to:

- Dan Carpenter (born 1985), former American football player
- Daniel C. Carpenter (1816–1866), American law enforcement officer and police inspector of the New York Police Department
- Daniel Carpenter (political scientist), American political scientist and writer
