= Valerija Raulinaitis =

American physician (1915–2004)

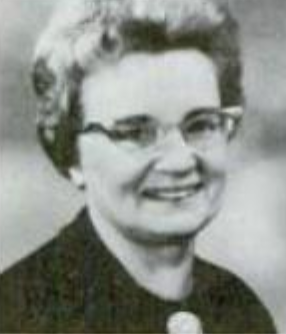
- Valerija B. Raulinaitis, from a 1970 publication
- Born: Valerija Birute Berzinskas; March 5, 1915; Riga
- Died: February 26, 2004 (aged 88); California
- Occupations: Physician, hospital administrator

Valerija Birute Raulinaitis (March 5, 1915 – February 26, 2004) was a Lithuanian-American physician. In 1971, she became the first woman appointed to head a Veterans Administration (VA) hospital.

== Early life and education ==
Valerija Birute Berzinskas was born in Riga and raised in Lithuania, the daughter of Victor Berzinskas and Maria Narkeviciute. She earned her medical degree at Vytautas Magnus University in Kaunas. In the United States, she pursued further training in psychiatry at the Downey Veterans Administration Hospital in Chicago.

== Career ==
Raulinaitis practiced medicine in Lithuania from 1938 to 1944, until she fled Lithuania with her husband and daughter. She worked as a doctor in a displaced persons camp in Germany from 1944 to 1949, then moved to the United States.

In the United States, Raulinaitis was a laboratory technician and pediatrician at Harper Hospital in Detroit, and as a psychiatrist at Woodward State Hospital in Iowa. She became a psychiatrist at the Downey VA Hospital in 1957, and in 1960 became head of the women's neuropsychiatric program at Downey. She became chief of staff at Downey in 1962, the first woman to hold that role at an American VA hospital.

In 1971, Raulinaitis was appointed director of the Pittsburgh (Leech Farm Road) VA hospital, becoming the first woman to head a VA hospital. In 1973, she became director of the American Lake Veterans Hospital in Tacoma, Washington.

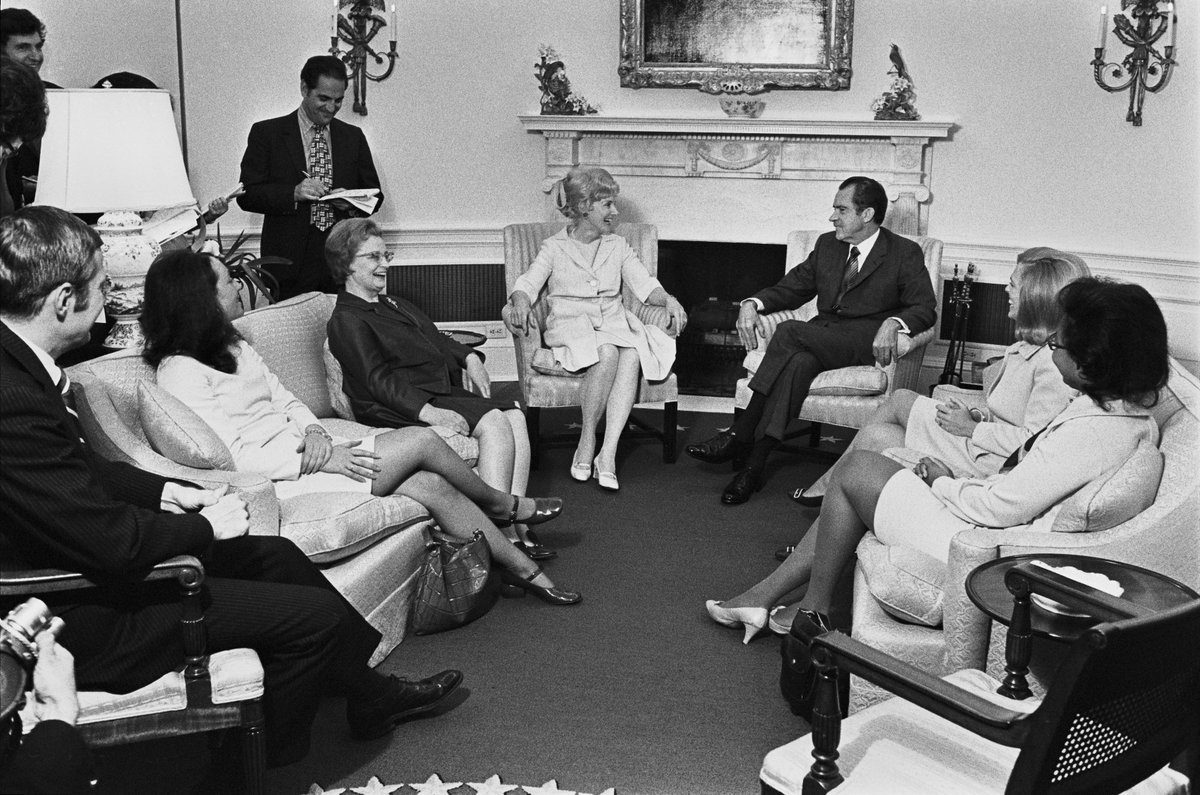
President Richard Nixon meeting with Vicki Keller, Jayne Baker Spain, Barbara Franklin, Sallyanne Payton, and Valerija Raulinaitis in 1971

== Honors ==
Raulinaitis was one of the six recipients of the Federal Woman's Award in 1970, and attended a reception with the other recipients in the Oval Office in 1971. Also in 1970, she was elected as a Fellow of the American Psychiatric Association.

== Publications ==
- "Therapeutic Democracy: Group Process as a Corrective Emotional Experience" (1965, with Keith K. Hoover and Fred E. Spaner)

== Personal life ==
Valerija Berzinskas married American-born economist Viktoras Raulinaitis. They had a daughter, Ruta, born in 1943. The retired to California together. Her husband died in 1986, and she died in 2004, at the age of 88.
