= Sallyanne =

Sallyanne is a feminine given name. Notable people with the name include:

- Sallyanne Atkinson (born 1942), Australian politician
- Sallyanne Payton, American lawyer
- Sallyanne Short (born 1968), Welsh sprinter

== See also ==
- Sally-Anne Upton, British–Australian actress
- Sally–Anne test, a psychological test to measure a person's ability to attribute false beliefs to others.
