= David Coe =

David Coe may refer to:

- David Allan Coe (1939–2026), American outlaw country music singer and songwriter
- David Coe (businessman) (c.1954–2013), Australian businessman
