= Max Stier =

American lawyer and good governance advocate

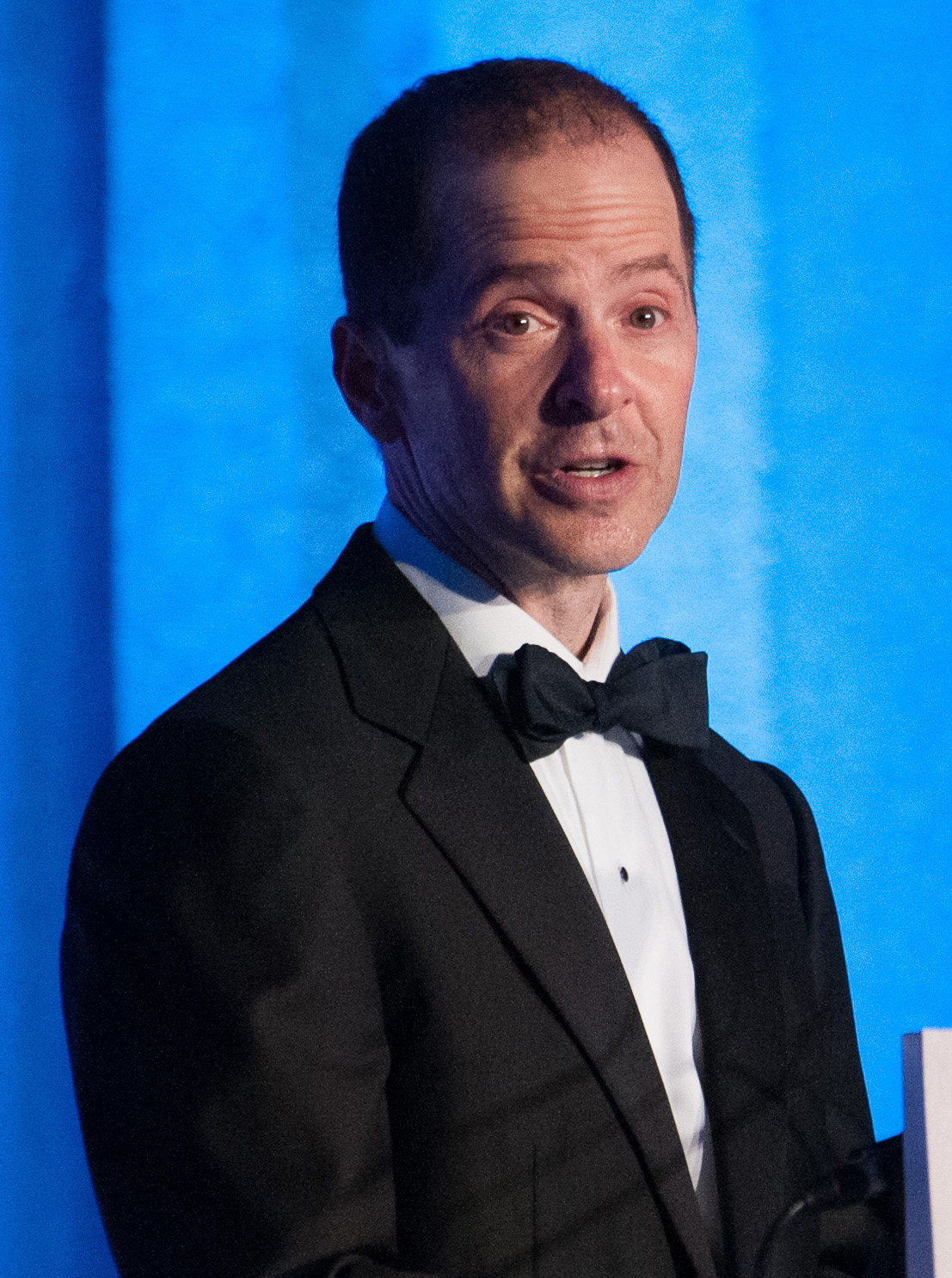
- Stier in 2013
- Born: Max Ian Stier; November 26, 1965 (age 60); Torrance, California, U.S.
- Education: Yale University (BA); Stanford University (JD)
- Known for: President and CEO of the Partnership for Public Service
- Political party: Democratic
- Spouse: Florence Y. Pan (m. 2004)
- Children: 2

Max Ian Stier (born November 26, 1965) is an American attorney who serves as the president and CEO of the Partnership for Public Service.

== Early life and education ==
Stier is the son of Serena Auster Stier and Herbert A. Stier. His mother is a mystery writer and adjunct assistant professor of law and art history at the University of Iowa; his father was an orthopedic surgeon in Los Angeles. He earned a Bachelor of Arts degree from Yale University in 1987 and a Juris Doctor degree from Stanford Law School in 1992.

While attending Yale University, Stier allegedly saw Brett Kavanaugh—now an associate justice of the U.S. Supreme Court—with his pants down at a drunken dorm party, where friends pushed Kavanaugh's penis into the hand of a female student.

== Career ==
In 1982, he worked on the staff of Republican Congressman Jim Leach. In 1992, he clerked for Chief Judge James L. Oakes of the U.S. Court of Appeals for the Second Circuit. In 1994, he served as a clerk for Justice David Souter of the U.S. Supreme Court.

In 1995, Stier joined the Washington D.C. firm of Williams & Connolly where he was part of President Bill Clinton's defense team during the Clinton–Lewinsky scandal.

Stier was always concerned with the quality of government workers and convinced hedge fund manager Samuel Heyman to contribute $25 million to start up a not-for-profit dedicated to attracting qualified young people to government service, the Partnership for Public Service.

== Personal life ==
Stier has been married twice. His current marriage is to former Stanford Law School classmate Florence Y. Pan—with the wedding ceremony held at the New Zealand embassy in Washington, D.C. on May 22, 2004. The couple have two sons.

In 2016, President Barack Obama nominated Pan to serve as a United States District Judge of the United States District Court for the District of Columbia. Her nomination expired in January 2017 with the end of the 114th Congress, but she was re-nominated June 15, 2021, by President Joe Biden, then elevated to the United States Court of Appeals for the District of Columbia Circuit on September 26, 2022.

== See also ==
- List of law clerks for the third seat of the Supreme Court of the United States
