= Propp =

Propp is a surname. Notable people with the surname include:

- Brian Propp (born 1959), Canadian ice hockey player
- Rodney Propp (born 1965), American real estate developer
- William Propp (born 1957), American historian of the Bible
- Vladimir Propp (1895–1970), Soviet scholar

James Propp (born 1960), American mathematician
