= Sparkle L. Sooknanan =

Trinidadian and Tobagonian-American judge (born 1983)

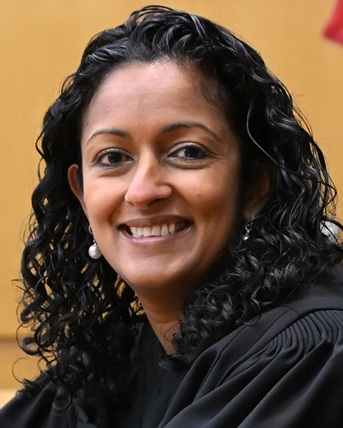
- Sooknanan in 2025

Judge of the United States District Court for the District of Columbia
- Incumbent
- Assumed office January 2, 2025
- Appointed by: Joe Biden
- Preceded by: Florence Y. Pan

Personal details
- Born: Sparkle Leah Sooknanan; 1983 (age 42–43) San Fernando, Trinidad and Tobago
- Education: St. Francis College (BS); Hofstra University (MBA); Brooklyn Law School (JD)

Sparkle Leah Sooknanan (born 1983) is a Trinidadian and Tobagonian-born American lawyer who has served as a United States district judge of the United States District Court for the District of Columbia since 2025.

== Early life and education ==
Sooknanan was born in San Fernando, Trinidad and Tobago, to parents of Indian descent. She graduated from Naparima Girls' High School in 2000, and later earned a Bachelor of Science, summa cum laude, from St. Francis College in 2002, a Master of Business Administration with distinction from Hofstra University in 2003 and a Juris Doctor summa cum laude, from Brooklyn Law School in 2010.

== Early legal career (2010–2025) ==
From 2010 to 2011, Sooknanan served as a law clerk for Judge Eric N. Vitaliano of the United States District Court for the Eastern District of New York, from 2011 to 2012, she was a law clerk for Judge Guido Calabresi of the United States Court of Appeals for the Second Circuit and from 2013 to 2014, she was a law clerk for Justice Sonia Sotomayor of the U.S. Supreme Court. From 2012 to 2013, she worked at the United States Department of Justice as an appellate attorney in the Civil Division.

From 2014 to 2021, Sooknanan worked in private practice at Jones Day, becoming a partner at the firm in 2020. Sooknanan resigned from Jones Day in January 2021. Before her resignation, The New York Times reported that she denounced the firm's work in Pennsylvania on behalf of the Trump administration, saying that one lawsuit "was brought for no other reason than to deprive poor people of the right to vote." In her 2024 confirmation hearing before the U.S. Senate, Sooknanan denied saying this, stating "Those were not my words. I do not know who provided that quote to the reporter."

Sooknanan was a deputy associate attorney general in the U.S. Department of Justice from 2021 to 2023. From 2023 to 2025, she served as the principal deputy assistant attorney general in the Civil Rights Division of the U.S. Department of Justice.

== Federal judicial service (2025–present) ==
On February 21, 2024, President Joe Biden announced his intent to nominate Sooknanan to serve as a United States district judge of the United States District Court for the District of Columbia. Sooknanan was recommended to the seat by Delegate Eleanor Holmes Norton. On February 27, 2024, her nomination was sent to the Senate. President Biden nominated Sooknanan to the seat vacated by Judge Florence Y. Pan, who was elevated to the United States Court of Appeals for the District of Columbia Circuit on September 28, 2022. On March 20, 2024, a hearing on her nomination was held before the Senate Judiciary Committee. During her confirmation hearing, she was questioned by Senator Josh Hawley over her work for Jones Day representing hedge fund investors working in Puerto Rico. Sooknanan served as lead counsel on behalf of Puerto Rican bondholders or vulture funds who were seeking to maximize recovery of money during the Puerto Rican government-debt crisis. Sooknanan told Hawley that she had not been lead counsel, although legal records and Jones Day confirmed that she had been lead counsel. On April 18, 2024, her nomination was reported out of committee by a 11–10 party-line vote. On November 20, 2024, the United States Senate invoked cloture on her nomination by a 51–49 vote. On December 3, 2024, her nomination was confirmed by a 50–48 vote. She received her judicial commission on January 2, 2025.

Legal offices
Preceded by Florence Y. Pan	Judge of the United States District Court for the District of Columbia; 2025–present	Incumbent
