= Allco Finance Group =

Financial services business

- Industry: Financial services
- Founded: 1979
- Founder: David Coe
- Defunct: 2008
- Fate: liquidation
- Headquarters: Sydney, Australia
- Key people: David Clarke (Chief Executive Officer)

Allco Financial Group was a fully integrated global financial services business, listed on the Australian Securities Exchange and headquartered in Sydney. Major services provided were structured asset finance, funds management and debt and equity funding. At one stage before liquidation, Allco had over A$4.3 billion in assets, and had financed over A$60 billion of transactions. In its most visible public transaction Allco was a part of Airline Partners Australia, the consortium that unsuccessfully attempted to buy Qantas. The company is now in liquidation, after previously being in administrative receivership, following difficulties in refinancing debt and a share price fall of 99% since the beginning of the subprime mortgage crisis.

== History ==
Allco Financial Group was founded in 1979 by John Kinghorn alongside founding partners John Bennett, Peter Cadwallader, and Chris Ells. David Coe was not one of the original 1979 founders; Kinghorn recruited him from the law firm Mallesons Stephen Jaques in 1986. to originate and arrange structured finance transactions for aircraft, ships and rolling stock. Over the years, Allco grew to provide funding for other services, including infrastructure and commercial finance. Allco operated globally and employed over 500 people.

Allco listed on the Australian Securities Exchange in 2006 after merging with Record Investments, which was set up by Allco as its listed investment vehicle in 2001. At the time of listing, the merged entity was valued at A$3billion. Former Westpac senior executive David Clarke was appointed as the new CEO. Ray Fleming took over the CFO role in June 2008 after Tim Dodd's departure.

In December 2006, Allco, along with several other firms, formed the Airline Partners Australia consortium as a bidding vehicle to Qantas although the deal failed in May 2007.

In December 2007 Allco led the acquisition by Australian investors of a series of power plants in the U.S. Northeast from Consolidated Edison, owner of New York City's electric utility, for US$1.48 billion.

== Sub-prime crisis ==
Fallout from the subprime mortgage crisis caused major problems for the company, prompting investor concerns about rising debt levels and causing Allco to refocus its operating model to within business sectors it knew well. Chairman David Coe and two other directors, Gordon Fell and David Turnbull, resigned from the board in March 2008. In May 2008, the European rail leasing business was sold to BTMU Capital Corporation.

Banks seized 14% of the company's shares after it defaulted on margin loans. The company was placed in voluntary administration on 4 November 2008.

Major news agencies ran the details of the first major victim of the credit crisis in tandem with the fall of ABC Learning the following day. In 2009, Allco Aircraft was sold to HNA Group.

== Investment areas ==
Allco invested in many different offerings, mainly in the property and transport areas:

- Aviation – Allco owned or managed 54 commercial jet aircraft, with another 40 on order. Most were on lease to carriers such as Qantas
- Shipping – Allco owned or managed 38 shipping vessels with another 23 on order
- Rail – Allco owned over 3100 railcars and 29 locomotives
- Infrastructure – Ownership of various facilities, including power generation (including wind), waste water treatment, pipelines, port facilities and energy distribution facilities
- Property – Ownership of over 117 major properties in 8 countries
