= Joseph A. Greenaway Jr. =

American judge (born 1957)

Joseph Greenaway
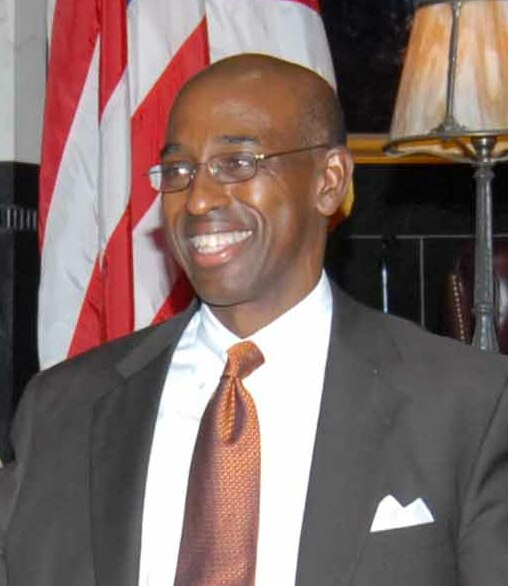
- Greenaway in 2010

Judge of the United States Court of Appeals for the Third Circuit
- In office February 12, 2010 – June 15, 2023
- Appointed by: Barack Obama
- Preceded by: Samuel Alito
- Succeeded by: Emil Bove

Judge of the United States District Court for the District of New Jersey
- In office July 26, 1996 – February 24, 2010
- Appointed by: Bill Clinton
- Preceded by: John F. Gerry
- Succeeded by: Claire C. Cecchi

Personal details
- Born: Joseph Anthony Greenaway Jr. November 16, 1957 (age 68) London, England
- Spouse: Valerie Purdie
- Education: Columbia University (BA); Harvard University (JD)

Joseph Anthony Greenaway Jr. (born November 16, 1957) is a British-American lawyer who served as a United States circuit judge of the United States Court of Appeals for the Third Circuit from 2010 to 2023. He also previously sat on the United States District Court for the District of New Jersey from 1996 to 2010. On February 9, 2010, he was confirmed to his seat on the Third Circuit, filling the vacancy created by Justice Samuel Alito's elevation to the United States Supreme Court. Greenaway had been mentioned as a possible candidate for the Supreme Court by President Barack Obama. He is currently a partner at the law firm Arnold & Porter.

== Early life and education ==
Greenaway was born of West Indian parents in London, England, and immigrated to the United States at the age of two, residing in Harlem, New York. His father is a carpenter and his mother is a nurse.

Greenaway was on the varsity baseball team at the Bronx High School of Science, from which he graduated in 1974. Greenaway earned a Bachelors of Arts degree from Columbia University in 1978 and a Juris Doctor from Harvard Law School in 1981. From 1982 until 1983, he worked as a law clerk for Judge Vincent Lyons Broderick of the United States District Court for the Southern District of New York.

== Career ==
Greenaway worked in private practice in New York City from 1981 until 1985. He became an Assistant United States Attorney at the U.S. Attorney's Office for the District of New Jersey from 1985 to 1989, when he became the chief of narcotics for the District of New Jersey. From 1990 to 1996, Greenaway worked as in-house counsel for Johnson & Johnson in New Brunswick, New Jersey. From 2002 to 2006, Greenaway was an adjunct professor at Rutgers School of Law in Newark, New Jersey. He is an adjunct professor at Cardozo School of Law where he teaches a course on trial practice and a seminar on the Supreme Court as well as an adjunct at Columbia University, where he also teaches a seminar on the Supreme Court. Since 2018, he has been a lecturer on law at Harvard Law School.

=== Federal judicial service ===
==== District court service ====
Greenaway was nominated by President Bill Clinton on November 27, 1995, to a seat on the United States District Court for the District of New Jersey vacated by Judge John F. Gerry. He was confirmed by the United States Senate by voice vote on July 16, 1996, and received commission on July 26, 1996. His service terminated on February 24, 2010, due to his elevation to the court of appeals.

==== Court of appeals service ====
Greenaway was nominated by President Barack Obama on June 19, 2009, to a seat on the United States Court of Appeals for the Third Circuit vacated by Judge Samuel Alito, who was elevated to the Supreme Court of the United States on January 31, 2006. On February 9, 2010, he was confirmed by the Senate by an 84–0 vote. He received his commission on February 12, 2010. He retired from the bench on June 15, 2023. He joined the law firm Arnold & Porter in September 2023.

== Personal life ==
Greenaway is married to Columbia University professor Valerie Purdie Greenaway. He is currently a trustee of Columbia University.

== See also ==
- Barack Obama Supreme Court candidates
- List of African-American federal judges
- List of African-American jurists

Legal offices
Preceded by John F. Gerry	Judge of the United States District Court for the District of New Jersey; 1996–2010	Succeeded by Claire C. Cecchi
Preceded by Samuel Alito	Judge of the United States Court of Appeals for the Third Circuit; 2010–2023	Succeeded by Emil Bove
