= Carl Ezekiel Ross =

American judge (born 1977)

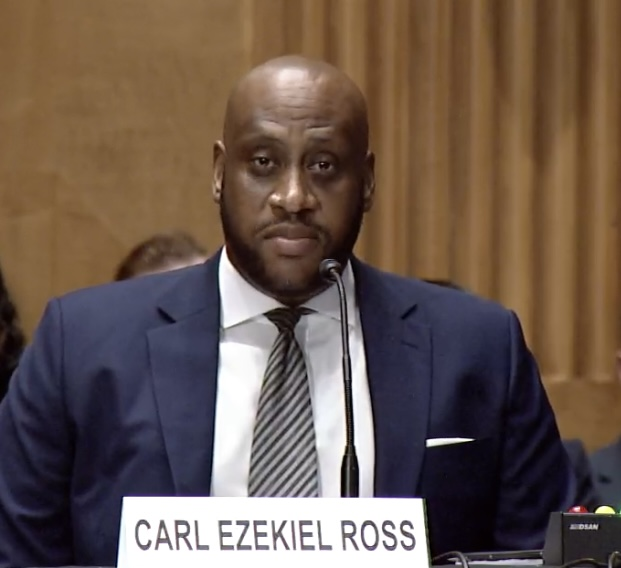

Associate Judge of the Superior Court of the District of Columbia
- Incumbent
- Assumed office January 17, 2023
- Appointed by: Joe Biden
- Preceded by: Florence Y. Pan

Personal details
- Born: December 10, 1977 (age 48) Washington, D.C., U.S.
- Education: Oral Roberts University (BA); College of William & Mary (JD)

Carl Ezekiel Ross (born December 10, 1977) is an American lawyer who has served as an associate judge of the Superior Court of the District of Columbia since 2023. He previously as counsel to the United States House of Representatives from 2017 to 2023.

== Education ==
Ross earned his Bachelor of Arts from Oral Roberts University in 1999 and his Juris Doctor from William & Mary School of Law in 2003, where he served as associate articles editor on the William & Mary Law Review.

== Career ==
After he graduated from law school, Ross served as a law clerk to James R. Spencer of the United States District Court for the Eastern District of Virginia. He worked as a litigation associate with Arnold & Porter before serving in the United States Attorney's Office. He served as an assistant United States attorney in the United States Attorney's Office for the District of Columbia. From 2017 to 2023, he served as counsel to the United States House Committee on Ethics in Washington, D.C.

=== D.C. superior court service ===
On November 6, 2019, President Donald Trump announced his intent to nominate Ross to serve as a Judge of the Superior Court of the District of Columbia. On November 19, 2019, his nomination was sent to the Senate. He was nominated to the seat vacated by Judge Judith Bartnoff. On June 3, 2020, a hearing on his nomination was held before the committee. His nomination was reported by favorably by the committee on July 22, 2020. On January 3, 2021, his nomination was returned to the President under Rule XXXI, Paragraph 6 of the United States Senate. His renomination was sent to the Senate on January 3, 2021. President Joe Biden withdrew his nomination on February 4, 2021.

On December 15, 2021, President Joe Biden nominated Ross to serve as a Judge of the Superior Court of the District of Columbia. President Biden nominated Ross to the seat vacated by Judge Florence Y. Pan, who was elevated to the United States District Court for the District of Columbia on September 23, 2021. On July 12, 2022, a hearing on his nomination was held before the Senate Homeland Security and Governmental Affairs Committee. On September 28, 2022, his nomination was favorably reported out of committee by voice vote en bloc, with Senators Rick Scott and Josh Hawley voting "no" on record. On December 15, the Senate confirmed his nomination by voice vote. He was sworn in on January 17, 2023.

Legal offices
Preceded by Florence Y. Pan	Judge of the Superior Court of the District of Columbia; 2023–present	Incumbent
