= Claire C. Cecchi =

American judge (born 1964)

Claire Cecchi
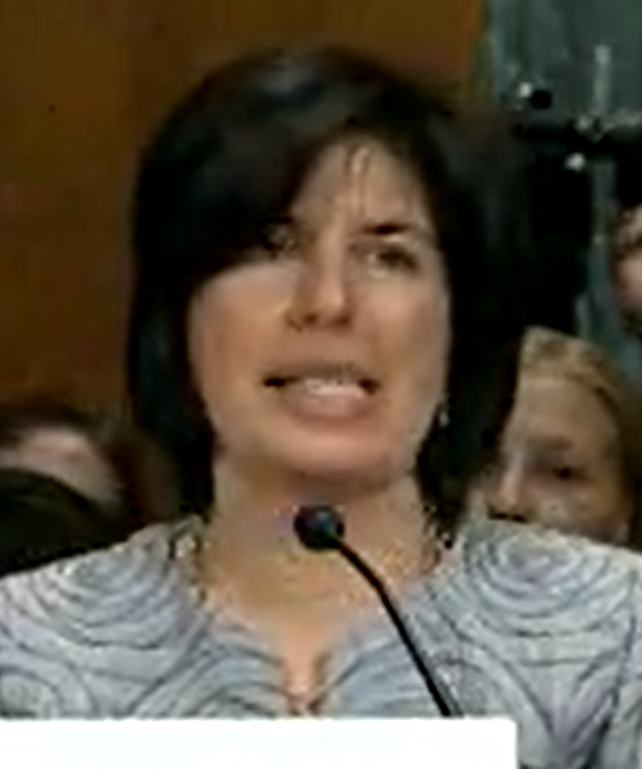

Judge of the United States District Court for the District of New Jersey
- Incumbent
- Assumed office June 14, 2011
- Appointed by: Barack Obama
- Preceded by: Joseph A. Greenaway Jr.

Magistrate Judge of the United States District Court for the District of New Jersey
- In office 2006 – June 14, 2011

Personal details
- Born: Claire Claudia Chadirjian; January 18, 1964 (age 62) Queens, New York, U.S.
- Education: Barnard College (BA); Fordham University (JD)

Claire Claudia Cecchi (née Chadirjian; born January 18, 1964) is an American lawyer and jurist serving as a United States district judge of the United States District Court for the District of New Jersey sitting in Newark, New Jersey. She joined the court as a United States magistrate judge in 2006.

== Early life and education ==
Cecchi was born in Queens as Claire Claudia Chadirjian, the daughter of second generation Armenian Americans. She was raised in Whitestone, Queens. Cecchi graduated from the Bronx High School of Science in 1982. She earned a Bachelor of Arts degree from Barnard College in 1986 and a Juris Doctor from the Fordham University School of Law in 1989.

== Career ==
Following graduation from law school, Cecchi worked in the New York City Law Department, where she handled litigation matters. She was an associate at Robinson, St. John & Wayne from 1992 to 1996 and its successor firm, Robinson, Lapidus & Livelli in 1996. From 1997 to 2001, Cecchi was an associate at the firm of Carpenter, Bennett & Morrissey and a partner from 2001 to 2004. Between 2005 and 2006, she worked as a partner at McElroy, Deutsch, Mulvaney & Carpenter, LLP. Cecchi is a fellow of the American Bar Association, a director to the Historical Society of the United States District Court for the District of New Jersey, and a master of the William J. Brennan, Jr./Arthur T. Vanderbilt American Inn of Court.

=== Federal judicial service ===
On the recommendation of Senators Frank Lautenberg and Robert Menendez, Cecchi was nominated to the United States District Court for the District of New Jersey by President Barack Obama on December 1, 2010, to a seat vacated by Joseph A. Greenaway Jr., who was elevated to the United States Court of Appeals for the Third Circuit on February 24, 2010. On June 14, 2011, the United States Senate confirmed Cecchi by a 98–0 vote. She received her commission on the same day.

== Personal life ==
Cecchi met her husband, James Cecchi, in law school. James is a partner at Carella, Byrne, Cecchi, Brody & Agnello in Roseland, New Jersey.

Legal offices
Preceded by Joseph A. Greenaway, Jr.	Judge of the United States District Court for the District of New Jersey; 2011–present	Incumbent
