= Jayne Spain =

American businesswoman (1927–2003)

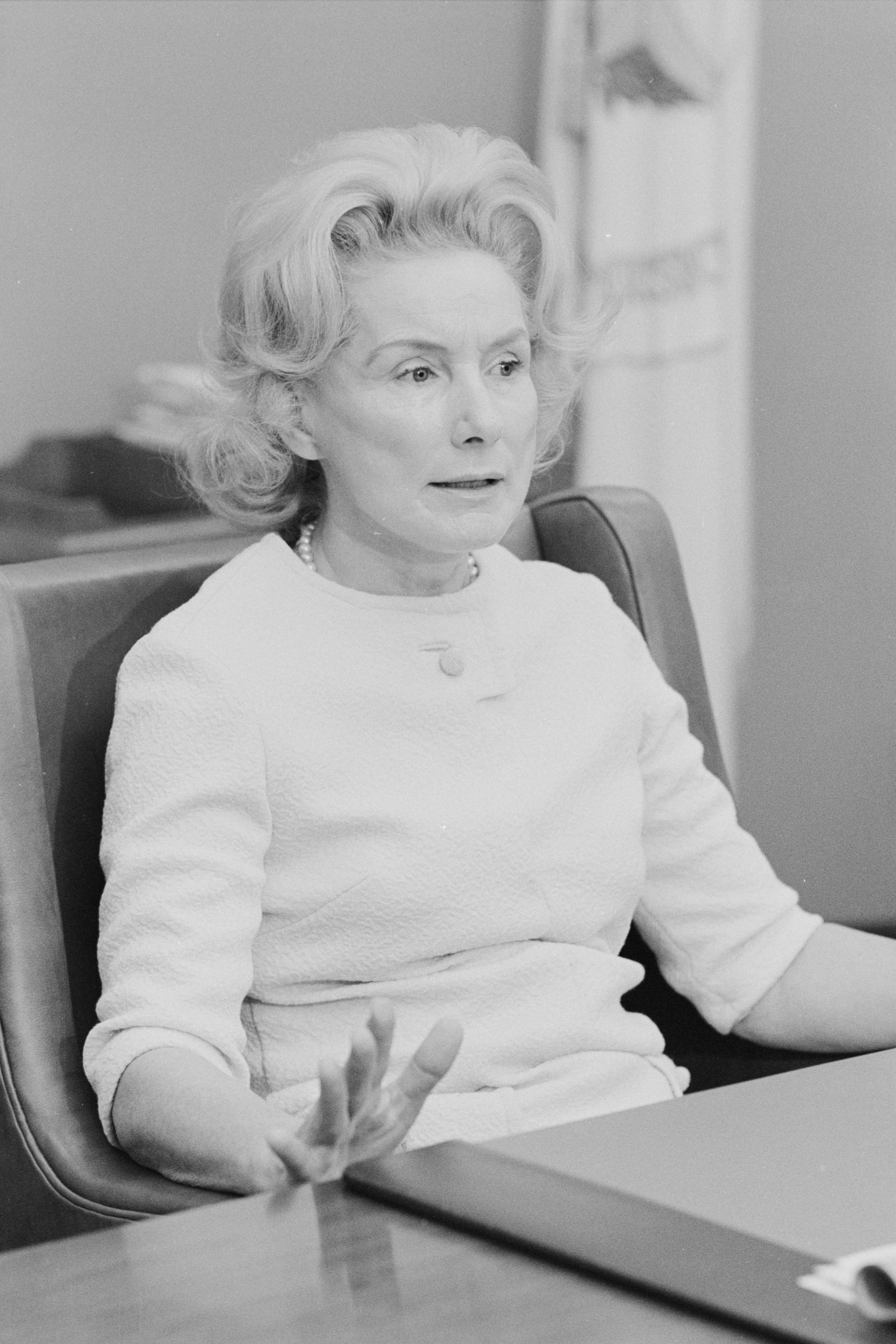
- Born: March 28, 1927; San Francisco, California, US
- Died: March 1, 2003 (aged 75); Kenwood, Ohio, US
- Education: University of California, Berkeley; University of Cincinnati; Edgecliff College
- Spouse: John Spain (m. 1951)
- Children: 2

Jayne Baker Spain (March 28, 1927 – March 1, 2003) was an American businesswoman. She was appointed to vice-chairman of the United States Civil Service Commission by President Richard Nixon in 1971.

== Early life and education ==
Spain was born on March 28, 1927, in San Francisco, California to parents Lawrence I. Baker and Marguerite (Buchanan) Baker. While attending the University of California, Berkeley, she was asked to assist in the children's rehabilitation center, which sparked her interest in assisting those with disabilities. She later attended the University of Cincinnati and Edgecliff College before marrying John Spain on July 14, 1951.

== Career ==
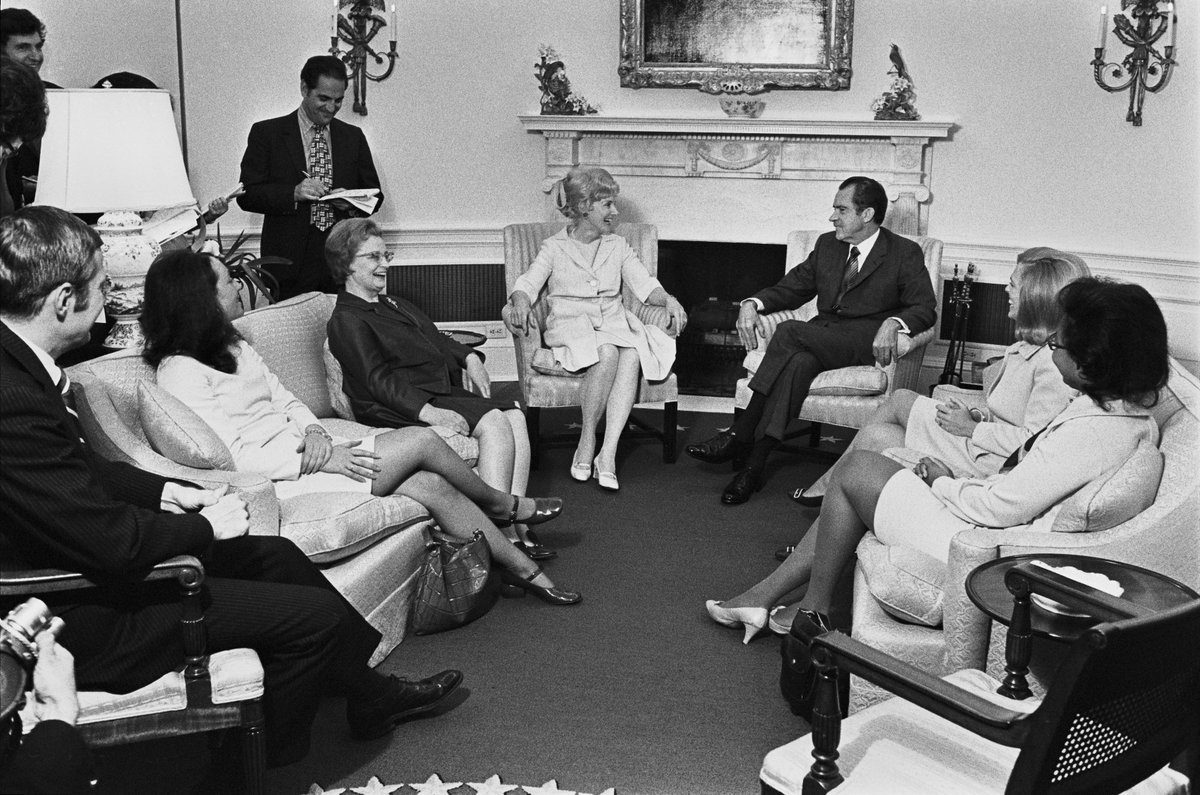
Nixon with Vicki Keller, Spain, Barbara Franklin, Sallyanne Payton, and Valerija Raulinaitis

After inheriting the engineering company Alvey-Ferguson in 1951, Spain made a point to hire one disabled worker in every 10 individuals she chose. With the assistance of the Cincinnati Association for the Blind, Spain taught blind workers how to assemble patterns to finish products. As a result of her activism for disability rights, she was appointed by President Lyndon B. Johnson to vice-chairwoman of the President's Committee on Employment of the Handicapped on September 12, 1966.

In 1966, Spain sold Alvey-Ferguson to Litton Industries but was later elected to their Board of Directors, one of the only women at the time to sit on a board of a large corporation. She was eventually elected their first female president. In 1971, Spain was nominated by Nixon to be vicechairman of the Civil Service Commission for a period of six years, with a salary of $38,000 a year. However, Spain resigned early in 1975 as she felt she had "gone as far as she could to open doors to women and the handicapped" inside government.

After concluding her governmental career, Spain was appointed the executive professor in residence at George Washington University and served as president of the Convalescent Hospital for Children in Cincinnati, Ohio and the Greater Cincinnati Hospital Council. She died on March 1, 2003, in Kenwood, Ohio.

== Awards and honors ==
Spain received an honorary degree from the University of Cincinnati and Bryant University. She was also inducted into the Greater Cincinnati Hall of Fame in 1994.
