= National Academy of Public Administration (United States) =

Nonprofit organization in Washington, D.C., United States

- NAPA Logo
- Abbreviation: NAPA
- Formation: March 30, 1967; 59 years ago
- Founder: James E. Webb
- Purpose: Public administration
- Headquarters: 1600 K St NW #400, Washington, DC 20006
- Members: Approximately 1,000 Fellows (2025)
- President and CEO: James-Christian Blockwood
- Website: napawash.org

The National Academy of Public Administration (NAPA) is a national academy of the United States in the field of public administration. As a congressionally-chartered, nonpartisan, and independent entity, its mission is to produce independent research and studies that advance the field of public administration and facilitate the development, adoption, and implementation of solutions to challenges of government administration. NAPA carries out its work outside of the government’s formal structure. It does not receive any direct federal appropriations.

Academy membership comprises scholars, public administrators, and former public officials who are elected as fellows due to their contributions to the field of public administration. As of 2025, there are more than 1,000 fellows.

It is one of two organizations chartered by Congress to support government oversight, along with the National Academy of Sciences.

== History ==
NAPA’s origins trace back to the late 1960s as public administration emerged as a field separate from political science. In 1967, NASA administrator James E. Webb, along with other senior government officials such as John D. Millett, was instrumental in the academy’s founding, aiming to establish an independent, non-partisan body to advise government leaders. By 1970, NAPA had formally separated from the American Society for Public Administration (ASPA) and incorporated as an independent organization dedicated to elevating the practice of public administration. NAPA was chartered by the United States Congress in 1984.

== Awards ==
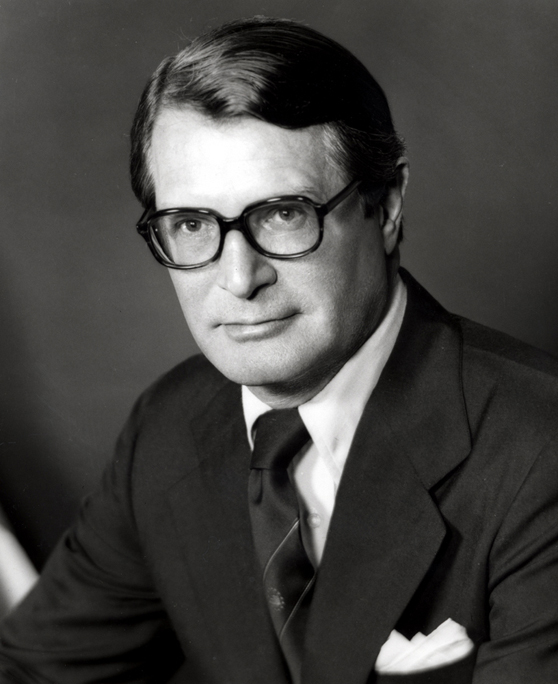
Elliot Richardson, longtime public servant, became the namesake for NAPA's award for integrity in public administration and a commitment to upholding the rule of law.

Each year, NAPA presents awards to recognize work in public administration. For example, the Louis Brownlow Book Award, established in 1968, honors outstanding literature in the field. The Arthur S. Flemming award, granted in partnership with George Washington University's Trachtenberg School of Public Policy and Public Administration, recognizes federal employees’ excellence in public service. Co-sponsored with ASPA, the National Public Service Awards honor individuals who make outstanding contributions and whose accomplishments are models of exemplary public service.

NAPA awards the Elliot L. Richardson Prize biennially to individuals who embody the public service virtues demonstrated by Elliot L. Richardson, the only person to have served in four cabinet positions: secretary of health, education, and welfare, secretary of defense, attorney general, and secretary of commerce. The prize honors those who have made significant contributions to the public good, shown a long-term commitment to public service, and exhibited generosity, thoughtfulness, courage, and integrity in their pursuit of excellence in government. Recipients are required to allocate half of their prize money to one or more charities of their choice. Past winners have included Paul Volcker, Sandra Day O’Connor, Colin Powell, Alice Rivlin, and William Ruckleshaus.

== Organization and services ==
Since January 2025, NAPA has been led by James-Christian B. Blockwood, a former senior official at the Partnership for Public Service, the Government Accountability Office, and the Departments of Defense, Homeland Security, and Veterans Affairs. He succeeded Teresa W. Gerton, the academy’s longest-serving leader, who accepted the position in 2017.

Executive directors and presidents include:

- George A. Graham (1967–1972)
- Roy W. Crawley (1972–1976)
- George Esser (1976–1982)
- J. Jackson Walter (1982–1985)
- Ray Kline (1985–1992)
- R. Scott Fosler (1992–2000)
- Robert J. O'Neill, Jr. (2000–2002)
- Phillip M. Burgess (2002–2003)
- Howard M. Messner (2003–2003)
- C. Morgan Kinghorn (2003–2006)
- Howard M. Messner (2006–2007)
- Jennifer L. Dorn (2007–2010)
- Kristine M. Marcy (2011–2011)
- Dan Gregory Blair (2011–2016)
- Terry Gerton (2017–2024)
- James-Christian Blockwood (2025–present)

Staff members work across two functional areas: academy studies and strategic initiatives. Academy studies provides consultancy services to a wide range of clients. Most studies are conducted on behalf of federal agencies, with many directed by Congress.

NAPA has also completed work for nonprofit organizations and foundations. Studies are led by project panels or expert advisory groups, which consist of elected academy fellows, with substantial professional staff support. Recent engagements have focused on organizational assessments, effective oversight, coordination, change management, strategy development, mission alignment, planning, budgeting, intergovernmental systems, and workshops.

The academy also provides advice to a wide range of organizations, including congressional committees; the Departments of Energy, Defense, and Homeland Security; the Office of Management and Budget; independent agencies such as the Environmental Protection Agency, the Pension Benefit Guaranty Corporation, the Small Business Administration, and the Federal Aviation Administration; law enforcement and public safety bodies such as the Federal Bureau of Investigation and the National Weather Service; and educational institutions such as the University of California.

=== Grand Challenges of Public Administration initiative ===
Strategic initiatives conducts research and convenes events related to the 12 challenges, identified by NAPA in 2019. The Grand Challenges fall within four major focus areas: protecting and advancing democracy; strengthening social and economic development; ensuring environmental sustainability; and managing technological changes.

=== Agile Government Center ===
The Agile Government Center is a partnership between NAPA and the IBM Center for the Business of Government. The AGC was launched in November of 2020 to bring together governments, nonprofits, foundations, academic institutions, and private sector partners to assist in developing and disseminating agile government principles.

=== Center for Intergovernmental Partnerships ===
The Center for Intergovernmental Partnerships was created in 2021 to find and create more effective ways for different levels and units of government to work together.

=== Management Matters podcast ===
The weekly Management Matters podcast, launched in 2020, features leaders from multiple sectors and levels of government addressing current topics in public service and public administration.

== Academy fellows ==
The unique source of the academy's expertise is its membership of fellows, who are elected because of their distinguished contributions to the field of public administration through their government service, scholarship, or civic activism. Academy fellows include more than 1,000 current and former public managers, scholars, business executives, labor leaders, cabinet officers, members of Congress, governors, mayors, state legislators, and diplomats who provide insight and experience as they oversee the academy's projects and provide general guidance.

Fellows are also the primary vehicle for addressing emerging issues and contributing to the intellectual and popular discourse on government. Fellows elect new members each year. The principal criterion for selection is sustained and outstanding contribution to the field of public administration through public service or scholarship.

Some notable fellows include:

- Donna Shalala
- William J. Walker
- Francis Fukuyama
- Paul H. O’Neill
- Alice Rivlin
- Kathryn Sullivan
- John Koskinen
- Sean O’Keefe
- Gene Dodaro
- Daniel Werfel
- Dan Tangherlini
- Jennifer Pahlka
- Anne-Marie Slaughter
- Donald Kettl
- Kaye Husbands Fealing
- Sallyanne Payton
- Mariko Silver
- David M. Walker
- Shelley H. Metzenbaum
- Susan Gooden
- Michael M. Crow
- Henry Cisneros
- Lee Hamilton
- Chris Lu
- Anthony A. Williams
- Daniel Carpenter

The board of directors also names honorary fellows who receive lifetime membership. This honor is reserved for persons who have distinguished themselves in public administration or through outstanding contributions to NAPA's objectives and purposes. Some notable honorary fellows include Sheila Bair, David Beasley, Norman Mineta, Sandra Day O'Connor, Colin Powell, and Douglas Wilder.

== See also ==
- Good government organizations in the United States
