= Samuel J. Heyman =

American businessman and hedge fund manager

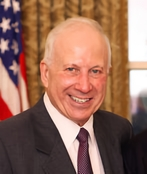
- Born: March 1, 1939; Danbury, Connecticut, US
- Died: November 7, 2009 (aged 70); New York City
- Education: Yale University (BA); Harvard University (LLB)
- Occupation: Businessman
- Spouse: Ronnie Feuerstein
- Children: Lazarus ("Larry") Heyman; Eleanor Heyman Propp; Jennifer Heyman Millstone; Elizabeth Heyman Winter

Samuel J. Heyman (March 1, 1939 – November 7, 2009) was an American businessman and hedge fund manager best known for his longtime chairmanship of the GAF Materials Corporation and International Specialty Products Inc. (ISP).

== Early life and education ==
Heyman was born to a Jewish family in Danbury, Connecticut, to Lazarus and Annette Heyman. His father was a real estate developer.

As an undergraduate at Yale College, Heyman was a regionally ranked varsity tennis player and member of Phi Beta Kappa. After graduating from Yale in 1960, he attended Harvard Law School, graduating in 1963. After graduation, he became an attorney for the US Department of Justice during the Kennedy Administration, rising to become Chief Assistant United States Attorney for Connecticut. In 1968, after the death of his father, he took over his family's Connecticut-based real estate firm, Heyman Properties.

== Business career ==
In late 1982, Heyman, by then a savvy risk arbitrage investor, acquired approximately 4.1% of the outstanding shares in GAF Corporation (GAF an abbreviation for General Aniline & Film), a troubled, 1960's-style conglomerate that was formerly owned by the US Government during each of World War I and World War II. Heyman invested in GAF with the expectation that then-Chairman, 65-year-old Dr. Jesse Werner, would retire. Between 1978 and 1981, in an effort to streamline the business and improve profitability, Werner sold GAF's consumer camera, projector, and photo processing operations (including the ubiquitous GAF View-Master stereoscopic 3D picture viewer) and its dyes and pigments businesses, leaving GAF with three businesses: GAF Chemicals (which would become International Specialty Products Inc.), GAF Broadcasting (at the time, the New York City-based classical radio station, WNCN-FM), and GAF Building Products (today's GAF Materials Corporation). When Dr. Werner reneged on his pledge to retire (he signed a five-year, multi million dollar employment agreement), Heyman prepared his own slate of directors, including Heyman as chairman, and ran against the incumbent Board and management team in an unprecedented proxy fight. In late December 1983, the shareholders voted to oust the existing Board (including Werner) and to install Heyman as CEO and chairman. At the time, given Heyman's minority ownership of less than 5% of the company, Barron's hailed the development as "one of the most striking achievements in the annals of corporate finance."

Within a year of Heyman's takeover, GAF's performance quickly improved due to a major cost-cutting initiative (which included relocating GAF's headquarters from the pricey Time-Life Building in Manhattan to suburban Wayne, New Jersey) and increased research and development outlays.

During the late 1980s, Heyman continued to invest his personal wealth using risk arbitrage, and subsequently encouraged GAF Corporation's treasury department to increase returns on the company's cash by also pursuing risk arbitrage as an investment strategy. This investment style led GAF Corporation to pursue the attempted hostile takeovers of Union Carbide in late 1985 (Union Carbide's stock had cratered as a result of the December 1984 Bhopal incident) and Borg-Warner in April 1987 (Borg Warner's stock was substantially undervalued due to the poor performance of its automotive business, which masked the exceptional performance of its chemicals business); these investments were operationally justified by Heyman in the public markets as an effort to increase the scale of GAF's chemical operations. Despite the inability of Heyman to complete these takeovers, his efforts resulted in large profits for GAF through the ultimate sale of the shares GAF had acquired in each of the target companies. Many of Heyman's takeover attempts were to be funded with commercial borrowings from Chase Manhattan Bank and high yield debt from Drexel Burnham Lambert. A close personal friend of Heyman was Martin A. Siegel, who lived across the street from Heyman in Green Farms, Connecticut, and the two often played tennis together. Later in Siegel's career, he would serve as Heyman's personal financial advisor.

In September 1987, Heyman offered to take GAF private for $2.3 billion, but the October 1987 stock market crash and the resulting changes in the economy resulted in a decline in GAF Corporation's performance through 1988. Nonetheless, Heyman pursued the privatization of GAF, and in March 1989, he and a select group of GAF management acquired the company for $1.4 billion in a leveraged buyout.

Two years later, in 1991, Heyman spun off GAF's chemical business as a separate entity and sold 19.6% to the public, listing the company, renamed International Specialty Products Inc. ("ISP"), on the New York Stock Exchange. Heyman spent much of the 1990s in a day-to-day management role, as Chairman of each of GAF Building Materials and ISP. Under Heyman's direction, on January 1, 1994, GAF Broadcasting changed the music format of its radio station from classical music to pure rock (and its call letters from WNCN-FM to WAXQ-FM), pursuing a younger audience with greater disposable income. After Congress passed the Telecommunications Act of 1996, which significantly reduced in-market ownership limitations, especially in large metropolitan areas, GAF Broadcasting was sold to Entertainment Communications, Inc. (who in turn swapped the radio station to Viacom, Inc. for three other radio stations) for $90 million. At the time, this was the highest price paid for a single radio station in the US, and reflected a value of more than 45.0 times cash flow.

Heyman continued to invest his own money and the cash accounts of each of GAF Building Materials and ISP in risk arbitrage, and in September 1996 Heyman took sizable long and short positions in Office Depot and Staples, Inc., respectively, when these two office products companies announced their merger. Unfortunately for Heyman, the US Justice Department refused to let the deal proceed, and Heyman lost nearly $200 million in trying to unwind his personal positions, and those at GAF and ISP.

Heyman returned to pursuing corporate takeovers in 2000, when he was involved in the unsuccessful takeover attempts of Dexter Chemical Corporation, the London Stock Exchange, and Hercules Corporation. In 2007, during Airline Partners Australia's attempted takeover of Qantas, his hedge fund, Heyman Investment Associates declined to accept Airline Partners Australia's offer for his shares in the airline. Much of the bidding team blamed Heyman for the takeover's ultimate failure.

In 1967, GAF's prior chairman, Dr. Werner, acquired a roofing company, Ruberoid Corporation. However, one of Ruberoid's roofing product lines included asbestos as a fire retardant, and the business acquired included an asbestos mine in Vermont. Despite the mine being closed in 1975, asbestos litigation grew substantially, with GAF eventually paying out more than $1.5 billion in asbestos-related bodily injury claims. Heyman unsuccessfully lobbied Congress to change the law governing asbestos litigation and eliminate punitive damages.

== Philanthropy ==
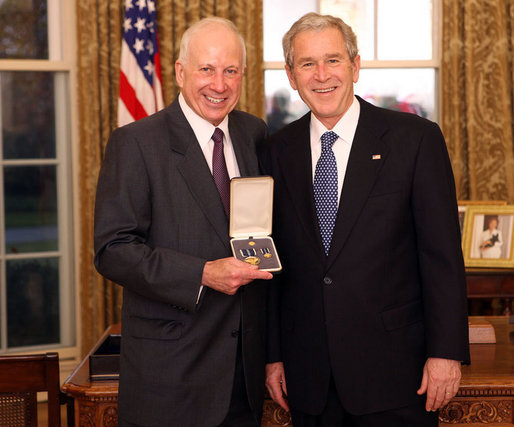
Former President George W. Bush presents Heyman with the Presidential Citizens Medal

Heyman had a diverse array of philanthropic interests. Most notably, he founded and served as chairman of the Washington-based Partnership for Public Service, a nonprofit organization that encourages undergraduates to pursue careers in public service. He endowed the Heyman Fellowship Program at Harvard Law School, Yale Law School, Columbia Law School, and Seton Hall School of Law to assist graduates with careers in federal government. He also established The Samuel and Ronnie Heyman Center on Corporate Governance at the Benjamin N. Cardozo School of Law. In 1985, Heyman received the Golden Plate Award of the American Academy of Achievement. Heyman won the Presidential Citizens Medal in 2008 for his charity work.

== Personal life ==
Heyman married Ronnie Feuerstein in 1970. Together, they had four children and nine grandchildren. His daughter Eleanor married real estate investor Rodney Propp; they have since divorced. Heyman and his wife owned a large collection of modern art, including works by Alberto Giacometti, Jackson Pollock, Jeff Koons and Mark Rothko. He was a member of the Fifth Avenue Synagogue.

Heyman died on November 7, 2009, at age 70 due to complications from open heart surgery.
