= Geraldine Downey =

Irish-American academic psychologist

- Education: University College Dublin; Cornell University
- Scientific career
- Fields: Social psychology
- Workplaces: Columbia University; University of the People

Geraldine A. Downey is an Irish-American social psychologist. She is the Robert Johnston Niven Professor of Humane Letters in Psychology at Columbia University. Downey is head of The Samuel and Ronnie Heyman Center on Corporate Governance and is a member of the University of the People's arts and sciences advisory board.

== Education ==
Downey received her BSc in psychology from University College Dublin, and her MA and PhD in developmental psychology from Cornell University in 1986.

== Career ==
Downey is the Vice Provost for Diversity Initiatives and Robert Johnston Niven Professor of Humane Letters in Psychology at the Department of Psychology, Columbia University. She a Fellow of the Association for Psychological Science. Downey heads The Samuel and Ronnie Heyman Center on Corporate Governance and is a director of the Center for Justice at the Columbia University. She is a member of the University of the People's arts and sciences advisory board.
