= Good government organizations in the United States =

The United States has a history of citizen, nonprofit, and other non-partisan groups advocating good government that reaches back to the late 19th- to early 20th-century Progressive Era and the development of governmental professional associations in the early part of the 20th century, such as the American Public Human Services Association and the International City/County Management Association. Many of these groups had their genesis at the Public Administration Center at 1313 East 60th Street, at the University of Chicago.

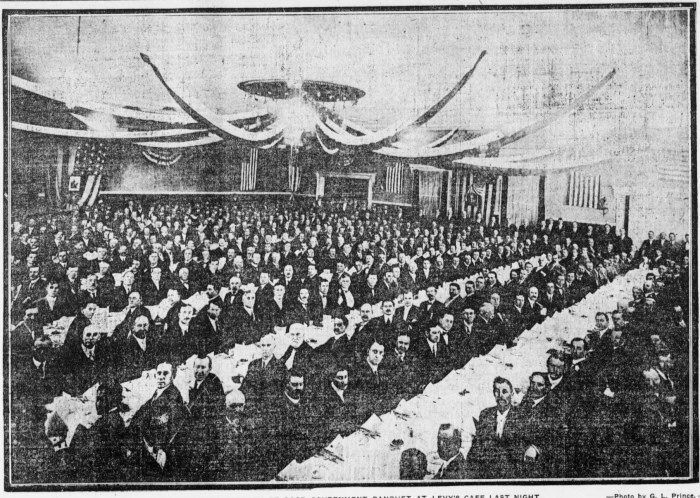
Some 600 members and friends of the Good Government organization in Los Angeles, California, pose for a photo in December 1909 to celebrate winning a municipal election.

Today, a wide range of non-partisan good government groups are committed to improving management at all levels of government. These are a mix of professional associations, advocacy groups, foundations, educational institutions, and non-profit organizations. Some focus on improvements in the different levels of government, such as the federal government; some focus on specific geographic areas, such as an individual city or region; and some focus on specific professional arenas, such as financial management or transparency in government.

== Federal good government organizations ==
There are at least two dozen organizations that focus on management improvement at the federal level:

Government Performance Coalition. The Coalition comprises nearly two dozen organizations. Formed in 1999, the Coalition meets regularly in Washington, DC to serve as a clearinghouse for its individual members’ respective agendas regarding government management improvement. During presidential election years, the Coalition sponsors events to highlight the importance of good government management issues in the campaign and to prepare materials that would be helpful to the winning candidate’s incoming political appointees.

American Society for Public Administration. Since 1939, ASPA has been one of the oldest good government associations. It represents a wide range of professional and academic interests in the public service arena. It advocates for greater effectiveness in government, agents of goodwill and professionalism, publishers of democratic journalism, purveyors of progressive theory and practice, and providers of global citizenship.

Association of Government Accountants. Since 1950, AGA has served government accountability professionals by providing quality education, fostering professional development and certification for its members who are government accountants, auditors, budget, and finance professionals. It supports the development of standards and research to advance accountability at all levels of government.

IBM Center for The Business of Government. The IBM Center was created in 1998. It connects public management research with practice by commissioning research reports from academics, journalists, and non-profit organizations. Through its research stipends and events, it facilitates discussion of new approaches to improving the effectiveness of government at the federal, state, local, and international levels.

Mercatus Center at George Mason University. The Mercatus Center at George Mason University is a research, education, and outreach organization that works with scholars, policy experts, and government officials to connect academic learning and real-world practice. Its mission is to promote sound interdisciplinary research and application in the humane sciences that integrate theory and practice to produce solutions that sustainably advance a free, prosperous, and civil society. It has a particular focus on accountability and government performance.

National Academy of Public Administration (United States). The National Academy of Public Administration is an independent, nonpartisan organization chartered by Congress in 1967 to assist federal, state, and local governments in improving their effectiveness, efficiency, and accountability. The unique source of the Academy's expertise is its membership of Fellows, who are elected because of their distinguished contributions to the field of public administration through their government service, scholarship, or civic activism. The Fellows of the Academy include more than 1000 current and former Cabinet Officers, members of Congress, Governors, Mayors, state and local administrators, legislators, business executives, and scholars.

Partnership for Public Service. The Partnership is a nonprofit, nonpartisan organization that works to revitalize the federal government by inspiring a new generation to serve and by transforming the way government works. It was founded in 2001 with a donation by businessman Samuel Heyman. It sponsors awards, research, and offers help to federal agencies in improving their personnel practices.

The Performance Institute. The Performance Institute has provided public sector performance management training and policy insights since 2000. The Institute’s research arm has sponsored a series of forums, research, and recommendations to bring insight and transformation to the federal government by emphasizing the importance of performance, accountability, and transparency in government and to disseminate the leading best practices to government managers.

The Project On Government Oversight (POGO) is a nonpartisan non-profit organization based in Washington, DC, that investigates and works to expose waste, fraud, abuse, and conflicts of interest in the U.S. federal government. Since 1981, POGO has worked with whistleblowers and government insiders to identify wrongdoing in the federal government, and works with government officials to implement policy changes based on its investigations.

== State good government organizations ==
In addition to professional, advocacy, and research groups that advocate good government at the federal level, there are similar non-partisan groups focused on state governments. Some are national in scope; some focus specifically on an individual state:

- Council of State Governments
- National Governors Association
- National Association of State Budget Officers
- National Conference of State Legislators
- California Forward

California Forward was formed in 2008 to renew the governance of the state government through citizen-driven solutions to provide better representation, smarter budgeting and fiscal management, and high quality public services “so all Californians could have the opportunity to be safe, healthy and prosperous in the global economy.”

== Local and regional good government organizations ==
In addition to national and state good government organizations, there are a number of organizations that promote good government. For example, the National Civic League (originally the National Municipal League) promotes effective local government management. Founded in 1894, its history is rooted in the Progressive Movement. Today, it brings together citizen activists for effective municipal and state government from across the country.

International City/County Management Association. ICMA was founded in 1914 as a professional association of city (and eventually county) managers. It conducts research and sponsors technical and educational opportunities for its members in order to improve and professionalize municipal and county government management.

There are also active civic groups promoting good government locally. The Community Indicators Consortium represents over 120 community groups promoting good local government and effective government performance. An example is The Boston Foundation, which sponsors grants and civic projects to improve the social and public sector infrastructure for the city.
