= Airline Partners Australia =

Airline Partners Australia (APA) was a consortium that made an unsuccessful A$11.1 billion takeover bid for Australian airline Qantas in 2006–2007. Its members included Texas Pacific Group, Macquarie Bank, Allco Finance Group, Allco Equity Partners and Onex Corporation. The proposal was a leveraged buyout that would initially have taken Qantas into private ownership while retaining its senior management.

Qantas's non-executive directors recommended the consortium's offer of A$5.60 per share in December 2006. The cash consideration was subsequently reduced to A$5.45 after Qantas declared an A$0.15 special dividend. The bid prompted debate about the airline's valuation, proposed debt burden, management incentives, employment and Australian ownership. Although it cleared regulatory reviews, several major shareholders considered the price inadequate. APA revised its financing and acceptance requirements, but failed to secure acceptances for more than half of Qantas's shares by 4 May 2007, the threshold needed to extend the offer. Attempts to revive the bid failed, and APA ruled out a renewed offer on 17 May.

== Background ==
The proposed buyout emerged during an expansion of private equity investment in Australia. Qantas had a strong position in the domestic market following the collapse of Ansett Australia, and its low-cost subsidiary Jetstar was expanding internationally. In his history of Qantas, journalist Matt O'Sullivan described the airline's cash generation and the potential value of businesses such as its frequent-flyer program as attractions for the bidders. Qantas executives, meanwhile, believed that the sharemarket undervalued the company. Jetstar's growth and lower operating costs were also identified as important attractions in contemporary reporting.

According to O'Sullivan, Macquarie approached Qantas executives in late 2005 and returned with a more developed proposal with Texas Pacific in October 2006. Qantas established a board subcommittee to consider a possible bid. Allco joined the consortium as it sought sufficient Australian investment to meet Qantas's foreign-ownership restrictions; Allco was already involved in leasing aircraft to the airline. Qantas publicly confirmed the takeover discussions on 22 November 2006.

== Company information ==
The consortium, comprising Texas Pacific Group, Macquarie Bank, Allco Finance Group, Allco Equity Partners and Onex Corporation, was structured to comply with strict Australian ownership laws for Qantas (which must be at least 51% owned by Australians).

Former Telstra chairman Bob Mansfield was a leading public representative of APA. The consortium proposed to retain Qantas chief executive Geoff Dixon and his management team, while replacing the non-executive directors with a board including representatives of its investors. In February 2007, APA said its partners would invest A$3.5 billion of their own money. Macquarie's proposed holding in APA was 14.9%.

== Takeover bid ==
=== Offer terms and financing ===
The initial proposal at A$5.50 per share was rejected. On 14 December 2006, Qantas's non-executive directors recommended a revised offer of A$5.60 per share, valuing the airline's equity at approximately A$11.1 billion. APA removed a proposed break fee of 1% of the bid's value and changed conditions to which the board had objected. The recommendation was conditional on there being no superior proposal and an independent expert finding the offer fair and reasonable.

Margaret Jackson (Chairman) said the proposal provided an attractive premium for Qantas shareholders, being 33 per cent higher than the closing share price of A$4.20 on 6 November 2006, the day before the first speculation about the offer; and 61 per cent above Qantas' volume weighted average share price of A$3.48 over the six months to that date.

Under the terms of the offer, the interim dividend that would otherwise have been payable in April 2007 would not be available. The Board decided that a fully franked special dividend could be paid during the bid period, in which case the offer consideration would be reduced by the dividend amount. On 8 February 2007, Qantas declared an A$0.15 special dividend, payable whether or not the bid succeeded. This reduced APA's cash payment to A$5.45 per share.

APA released its bidder's statement on 2 February 2007 and opened the offer on 5 February. It initially required acceptances for 90% of Qantas's shares. The offer was final unless a third party made an alternative proposal. In the independent expert's report released with Qantas's response, Grant Samuel valued the shares at A$5.18–A$5.98 before deduction of the special dividend and considered the offer fair and reasonable. The assessment recognised the airline's potential for further growth but also the risks of remaining invested in it.

The proposed financing would leave Qantas with approximately A$11 billion in debt and A$3.5 billion in equity. APA said it would support management's planned A$10 billion expansion, including 70 additional aircraft and a 40% increase in capacity by 2014. It argued that private ownership would permit longer-term investment decisions. To address concerns about the airline industry's volatility, it pointed to a proposed A$2 billion cash reserve, additional credit facilities and loan terms under which deterioration in financial performance alone would not trigger a default.

=== Shareholder opposition and revised terms ===
UBS Global Asset Management and Balanced Equity Management, which together represented about 10% of Qantas's shares, questioned the offer's adequacy as the airline's earnings outlook improved. They sought further financial information, and declined approaches from hedge funds seeking to acquire their holdings. On 15 March 2007, Qantas issued its third profit upgrade since confirming the takeover talks. It also said that the analysts' consensus forecast of approximately A$1.23 billion in pre-tax profit for 2007–08 was consistent with its expectations, while warning that fuel costs, competition and other risks could affect the result. APA maintained that it could not raise an offer it had declared final under the takeover rules of the Australian Securities and Investments Commission (ASIC).

On 12 April, APA announced revised financing and said it would proceed with acceptances for 70% of the shares, rather than requiring 90%. This would allow Qantas to remain listed with minority shareholders. The change was intended to overcome opposition from shareholders whose holdings could prevent compulsory acquisition of the remaining shares. Formally, APA's offer retained its 90% minimum-acceptance condition, which it had undertaken to waive if acceptances reached 70%.

APA also outlined plans to distribute up to A$4.5 billion from Qantas through capital-management measures during its first year of control. Distributions would go to all shareholders, including those who had retained minority holdings, and would help APA service its acquisition debt. APA said these measures would not affect the A$2 billion cash reserve it had promised to maintain. The prospect of receiving these distributions gave shareholders another reason to retain their shares rather than accept the takeover offer, according to analysis broadcast by the ABC's Four Corners.

== Takeover concerns ==
=== Government review and employment ===
The proposed debt burden attracted criticism from unions and members of both major political groupings. Former Nationals leader John Anderson questioned whether the airline would have sufficient resources to withstand a downturn; APA replied that its cash reserve and financing arrangements would protect it against industry shocks. Labor leader Kevin Rudd sought assurances about Australian operations, employees and regional services, and raised concerns about the airline's vulnerability to external shocks.

Prime Minister John Howard opposed using the foreign-investment review to impose restrictions on Qantas's commercial decisions or debt levels. He argued that shareholders should be free to sell their shares provided the transaction complied with the law, and warned of a business backlash against government intervention. He nevertheless criticised the generosity of some proposed executive remuneration. Treasurer Peter Costello warned the consortium that taxpayers should not be expected to rescue Qantas if its borrowing proved excessive.

On 6 March 2007, following examination by the Foreign Investment Review Board, Costello announced that the government would allow the transaction. APA provided a deed of undertaking covering Australian ownership and control, the location of Qantas's operations and regional services, which the government could enforce through injunctions. The deed also prevented Macquarie's representatives from voting on Qantas board matters concerning Sydney Airport.

The undertakings did not guarantee particular job numbers, and the commitment to regional services remained subject to market conditions. The Australian Financial Review reported that the investment program appeared among the deed's background commitments rather than its operative undertakings. Steve Fielding, whose proposed legislation concerning Qantas and Jetstar was still before a Senate inquiry, criticised the timing of the government's decision. Australian Council of Trade Unions secretary Greg Combet argued that the maintenance provisions were too broadly expressed to protect jobs from being moved offshore. Howard said that no company could guarantee an unchanged workforce indefinitely, while Transport Minister Mark Vaile said the government would not manage individual maintenance decisions.

After APA disclosed its capital-distribution plans in April, unions also questioned the security of employee entitlements if assets were sold or pledged to lenders. Qantas rejected proposals to secure those entitlements against aircraft and other assets, arguing that doing so would raise financing costs and that it had sufficient resources to cover its obligations to employees.

=== Competition review ===
Macquarie's interests in both Qantas and Sydney Airport raised concerns that the airport might favour Qantas over competing airlines. On 1 March 2007, the Australian Competition and Consumer Commission announced that it would not oppose the acquisition. It found that regulatory and corporate constraints limited Macquarie's influence over the airport and that there was no clear incentive for increased discrimination in Qantas's favour. The commission also examined links involving aircraft leasing, catering, aircraft parts and reservation services, and concluded that the acquisition was unlikely to substantially lessen competition.

=== Management incentives and board advocacy ===
The proposed financial benefits for Qantas managers prompted questions about conflicts of interest. Under the original arrangements, executives could acquire incentive shares amounting to 4.5% of the company, comprising 2.7% linked to continued employment and 1.8% linked to performance. Combined with their existing interests, management's stake could reach approximately 5.5%. APA would finance the incentive shares through interest-free loans with limited recourse. Dixon said that he would donate the proceeds of his long-term incentives to charity.

Qantas said that its independent directors had assessed the offer separately from Dixon and chief financial officer Peter Gregg, its two executive directors. In February, ASIC deputy chairman Jeremy Cooper told a Senate hearing that the regulator was satisfied with the measures taken to manage potential conflicts and had seen no evidence of a problem. Senators from several parties challenged that assessment, citing the executives' potential gains and Dixon's public support for the takeover.

In March, Jackson warned that the departure of hedge funds from the share register could destabilise Qantas if the bid failed. She said that anyone who expected this to occur without affecting the share price had a "mental problem with how the market works". She defended the board's handling of the bid and its procedures for managing conflicts, and maintained that she and Dixon remained committed to Qantas if the offer failed. Her remarks attracted criticism that she had gone beyond recommending the offer and was advocating for the bidder. In Four Corners, fund manager Roger Montgomery said she had appeared to act as a spokesperson for the consortium.

=== Bidder's disclosures ===
The Australian and International Pilots Association challenged APA's statements about Texas Pacific's airline experience and the durability of its investment in Qantas. On 20 March 2007, the Takeovers Panel concluded that statements about Texas Pacific's investments in Continental Airlines, America West Airlines and Ryanair were likely to mislead shareholders without further information about their size, timing and disposal. It was also concerned that assurances about committed ownership did not clearly explain that Texas Pacific could sell its entire interest in APA after completion. APA disputed that its disclosures were misleading, but agreed to send shareholders a further supplementary bidder's statement. In light of that undertaking, the panel declined to make a declaration of unacceptable circumstances.

== Failure of the bid ==
After extensions of the offer period, APA set a closing deadline of 7.00pm Sydney time on 4 May 2007 and said it would not extend the offer further. Acquiring voting power of more than 50% during the final week would, however, have triggered an automatic 14-day extension under the Corporations Act 2001. At the deadline, APA reported acceptances for only about 46% of the shares and announced that the offer would not proceed if that position was confirmed.

Approximately five hours after the deadline, APA received an acceptance for a further 4.96% of Qantas's shares. The shares were held by Heyman Investment Associates, associated with US investor Samuel J. Heyman. Counting that acceptance would have taken APA above the threshold for an extension; it would not by itself have satisfied the 70% requirement for proceeding with the acquisition. APA applied to the Takeovers Panel to allow the offer to continue as if the acceptance had arrived on time.

The initial panel declined to commence proceedings, and a review panel affirmed that decision on 6 May. The review panel found that shareholders had had a reasonable opportunity to participate and that one investor's late acceptance did not justify reopening the bid. It also rejected APA's argument that media speculation about the likelihood of success had misled shareholders into delaying acceptance.

APA subsequently considered relying on a clause in its offer documents to treat acceptances for part of a shareholder's holding as acceptances for the whole holding. On 8 May, it abandoned that argument, citing the time that litigation would take, and accepted that the offer had lapsed on 4 May. ASIC issued an instrument confirming the bid's closure. On 17 May, APA announced that it would not make a renewed offer, saying that another bid on terms acceptable to the consortium was unlikely to succeed.

== Aftermath ==
The failed takeover increased pressure on the Qantas board over its recommendation and handling of the offer. In May, Jackson announced that she would not seek re-election at the annual general meeting, and James Packer also announced his departure from the board. Dixon rejected suggestions that fellow directors had forced Jackson out. The board reaffirmed its support for management, and Dixon agreed to remain chief executive until at least July 2009. Leigh Clifford was subsequently appointed to succeed Jackson as chairman after the November 2007 annual general meeting.

When trading resumed on 8 May, Qantas shares closed at A$5.22, down A$0.16, despite earlier warnings of a much larger fall. Later that month the shares traded above APA's A$5.45 cash offer as Qantas outlined restructuring options, including reviewing ownership of its frequent-flyer program. In August, Qantas reported a record pre-tax profit of A$1.03 billion for 2006–07 and announced an approximately A$1 billion share buyback.

In a subsequent interview quoted in Matthew Benns's The Men Who Killed Qantas, Dixon said that management's potential financial gains had created a perception that it was compromised, and that he was pleased the takeover had failed. Writing in 2015, O'Sullivan argued that the proposed debt burden would have left Qantas vulnerable during the 2007–2008 financial crisis, in which Allco Finance Group collapsed.
