= David Coe (businessman) =

Australian businessman

David Coe (c.1954 – 21 January 2013) was an Australian businessman, best known for being the chairman and managing director of Allco Finance Group.

== Career ==
Coe first worked as a lawyer at Mallesons Stephen Jaques during the 1970s, before John Kinghorn, the founder of RAMS Home Loans, asked him to join Allco in 1986. Coe was instrumental in Allco becoming one of the world's biggest providers of finance to the infrastructure and aviation sectors.

Coe became known for his attempted takeovers of successful businesses, and unsuccessfully bid for Qantas Airline for a sum of $11.1 billion in 2006. In 2007 he oversaw the purchase by Allco of Gordon Fell's Rubicon Property Group, for $263 million. He and Fell were both directors of Allco, and Coe was a director of Rubicon. The Federal Court was later told that, eight months before its sale, Rubicon had commissioned a valuation from accountants KPMG, which had estimated the worth of the company at between $74 million and $88 million, roughly a third of the price that Allco paid.

Coe resigned as chairman of Allco in early 2008, shortly before the company collapsed under $1.1 billion of debt. Although many described the failure as a result of the 2008 financial crisis, others blamed the group’s complex structure and huge debt levels. After the downfall of Allco, Coe kept a lower profile, but remained involved in various business pursuits.

Coe donated nearly $1 million to the Sydney Children's Hospital and served on the board of the hospital's charity foundation from 1997 to 2009. He was a prominent supporter of the Museum of Contemporary Art in Sydney, and also served on its board.

== Death ==
He died on 21 January 2013 of a suspected heart attack while skiing in Aspen, Colorado, USA, and was survived by his wife Michelle and three sons.
