= Brereton Sturtevant =

American lawyer (1921–2008)

- Born: 1921; Washington, D.C., U.S.
- Died: 2008 (aged 86–87); Alexandria, Virginia, U.S.
- Known for: First female Examiner-in-Chief for the Patent Trial and Appeal Board

Brereton Sturtevant (1921 – 2008) was an American patent lawyer and government official. She was the first female law clerk employed by the Delaware Supreme Court, and was the first woman to hold the office of Examiner-in-Chief for the Patent Trial and Appeal Board.

== Biography ==
Sturtevant was born in Washington DC. She graduated from Wellesley College with a degree in chemistry in 1942. She then moved to Delaware and worked as a chemist for the DuPont Chemical Company in Wilmington for a time. In 1949, she passed the Delaware bar exam (placing first), graduated from Temple University Beasley School of Law, and in 1950 joined a Delaware law firm specializing in patent law. Meeting with success, Sturtevant later became the first female law clerk for the Delaware Supreme Court. In 1971, she was appointed by President Richard Nixon as Examiner-in-Chief for the U.S. Patent and Trademark Office Board of Appeals, also known as the Patent Trial and Appeal Board. She held this position until she retired in 1988. Sturtevant died in Alexandria, Virginia in 2008.
