= Daniel Carpenter (political scientist) =

American political scientist (born 1967)

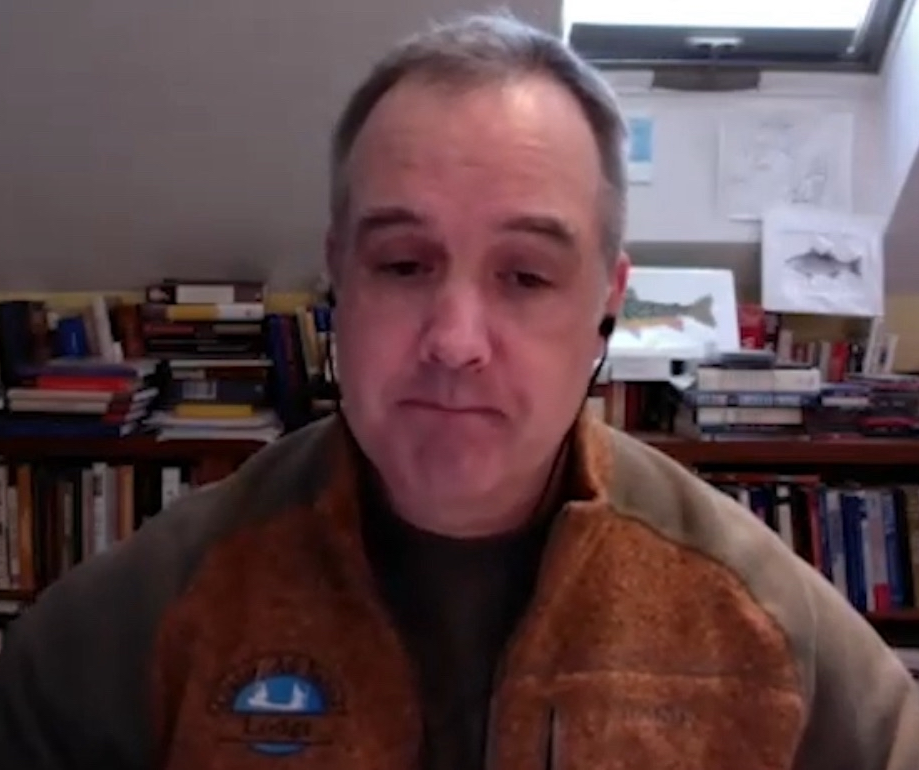
- Carpenter in 2021
- Born: Daniel Paul Carpenter; April 19, 1967 (age 59); Milwaukee, Wisconsin, U.S.
- Education: Georgetown University (BA); University of Chicago (MA, PhD)
- Occupations: Political scientist, writer
- Title: Allie S. Freed Professor of Government
- Website: dcarpenter.scholars.harvard.edu

Daniel Paul Carpenter (born April 19, 1967) is an American political scientist serving as Allie S. Freed Professor of Government at Harvard University. He is a fellow of the National Academy of Public Administration. As of 2026, he is also chair of the government department in the Harvard Faculty of Arts and Sciences.

Carpenter was born in Milwaukee, Wisconsin, on April 19, 1967. He graduated from Elk Rapids High School in Michigan before attending Georgetown University, earning his B.A. degree in government in 1989, and later received an M.A. degree and Ph.D. degree in political science from the University of Chicago, where he was advised by John F. Padgett. His doctorate was received in 1996 with a dissertation titled The Evolution of Corporate Attachment and Administrative Capacity in Executive Departments, 1862–1932.

In 2021, Carpenter wrote the book Democracy by Petition: Popular Politics in Transformation, 1790–1870, which was published by Harvard University Press. His book won the American Political Science Association's J. David Greenstone Prize for the best book in history and politics. A symposium reacting to the book was printed in the journal Social Science History in 2023. Introducing the symposium, Robert C. Lieberman described Democracy by Petition as "social science history at its very best".

Carpenter was given the title of Harvard College Professor in 2026 "for excellence in undergraduate teaching and for helping students 'develop their intellectual passions'".
