= Rodney Propp =

American real estate developer (born 1965)

- Born: 1965 (age 60–61)
- Education: B.A. Tufts University; M.B.A. University of Chicago
- Occupation: Real estate developer
- Known for: Co-founder of Tahl-Propp Equities
- Spouse: Eleanor Heyman (divorced)
- Children: 3
- Parent: Seymour Propp
- Family: Samuel J. Heyman (former father-in-law)

Rodney Propp is a New York-based real estate developer and co-founder of Tahl-Propp Equities.

== Biography ==
Propp was born to a Jewish family, the son of Seymour Propp. His father gained majority control of the Quincy Mining Company and took it private. His grandfather was a Jewish immigrant from Lithuania who became rich selling Christmas tree lights. He earned a B.A. from Tufts University and an M.B.A. from the University of Chicago and also studied at the London School of Economics and the School of the Museum of Fine Arts in Boston. After school, he worked for the investment bank Drexel Burnham Lambert and then left to work for the family real estate business. In 1997, he left the family business after being prevented from expanding the family's investments in SoHo and founded Tahl Propp Equities with Joseph Tahl, former attorney for Donald Trump. They raised $15 million and bought 16 apartment buildings in Detroit and a 300,000-square-foot office building in St. Louis. After this first investment, they focused on investing in Harlem, then overlooked by other real estate investors. They also own the 500,000 square foot 3 Gateway Center in Newark, New Jersey. As of 2012, they owned 4 million square feet of residential and commercial real estate, including 3,500 units of housing in Harlem, with a focus on affordable housing. They own and operate 17 affordable housing developments in Harlem and Washington Heights and eight conventional rental buildings.

The two partners complement each other, with Tahl making the deals and Propp focusing on the financing. They are known for rarely selling their buildings, instead letting their value grow as Harlem gentrifies.

== Philanthropy and accolades ==
Propp is a member of the Real Estate Board of New York, a lifetime member of the NAACP, and a director of specialty chemicals manufacturer, Peninsula Copper Industries. In 2008, he received the Foundation for Ethnic Understanding's Joseph Papp Racial Harmony Award for his efforts to strengthen race relations in New York's Harlem community. He serves on the Real Estate & Allied Trades Executive Committee of the United Jewish Appeal Federation in New York.

== Personal life ==
Propp was married to Eleanor Heyman, daughter of American businessman Samuel J. Heyman. They have since divorced. They have three children: Stella Propp, Juliette Propp, and Clara Propp.
