= Sallyanne Payton =

American lawyer

- Born: Los Angeles, California
- Education: 1964, Stanford University; 1968, Stanford Law School
- Occupation: Lawyer
- Employer: University of Michigan Law School

Sallyanne Payton (born in Los Angeles) is an American lawyer. She is the William W. Cook Professor Emerita of Law at the University of Michigan Law School. She was Stanford Law School's first African-American graduate.

== Early life and education ==
Payton was born and raised in Los Angeles, California, to an insurance underwriter and schoolteacher. She earned her law degree from Stanford Law School in 1968, becoming their first African-American graduate. During her time at Stanford, Payton served as an editor of the Stanford Law Review.

== Career ==
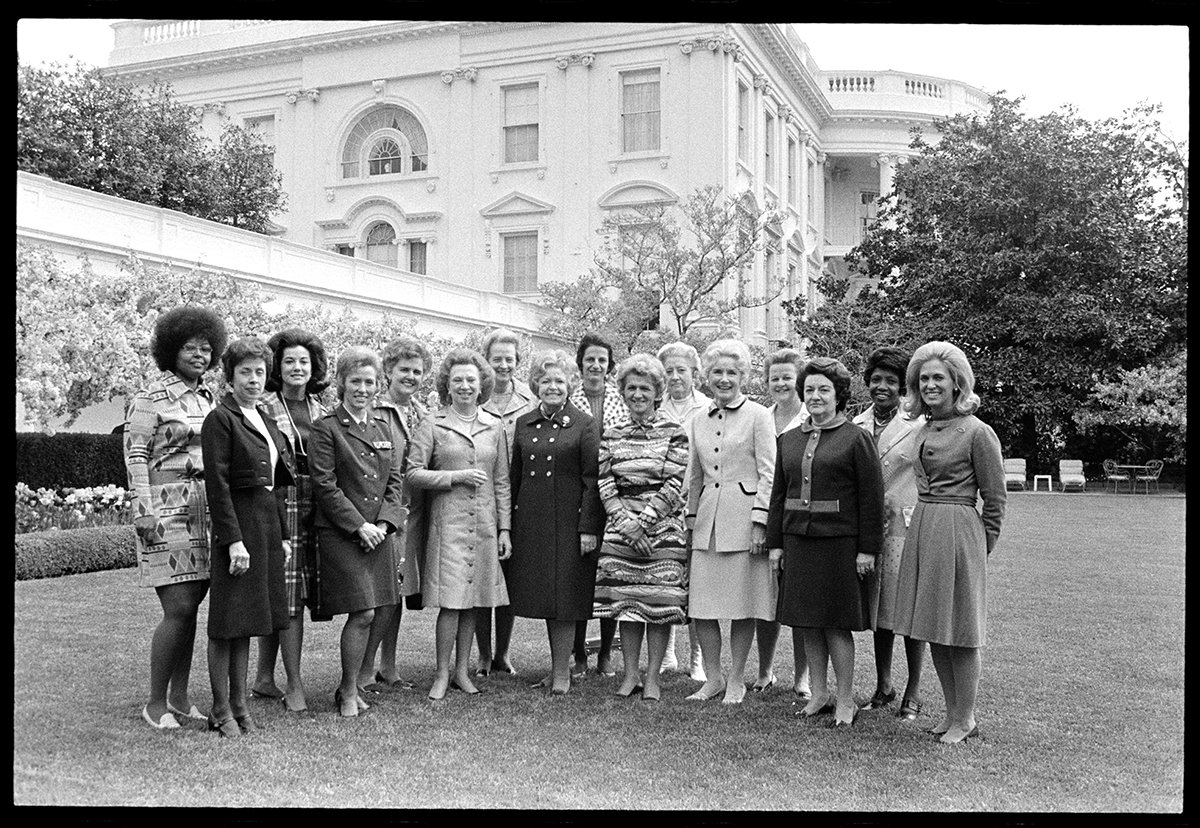
Payton at left, with female Nixon administration staff and high-level appointees: Ethel Bent Walsh, Brigadier General Jeanne M. Holm, Rose Mary Woods, Virginia Knauer, Helen Delich Bentley, Jayne Baker Spain, Evelyn Eppley, Barbara H. Franklin; (second row): Sallyanne Payton, Elizabeth Hanford, Georgiana Sheldon, Virginia Allan, Carol Khosrovi, Paula Tennant, Brereton Sturtevant, Gloria Toote.

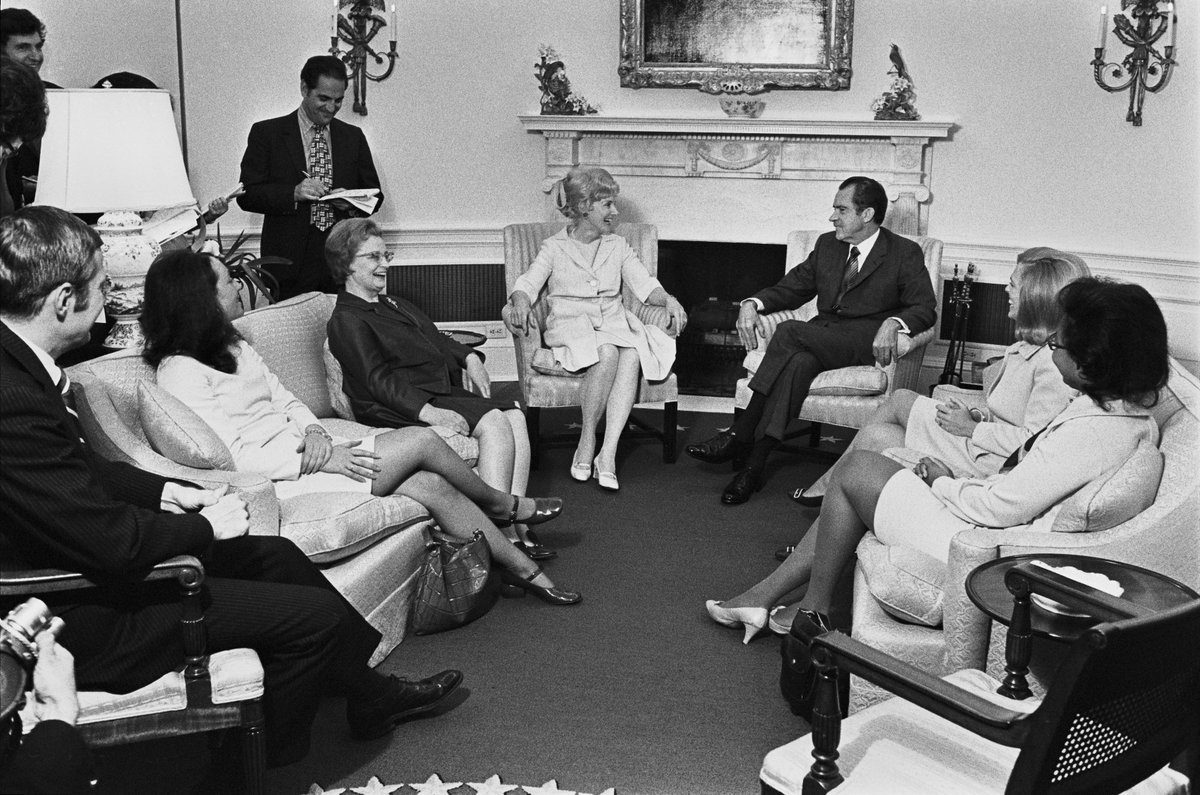
Nixon with Vicki Keller, Jayne Spain, Barbara Franklin, Payton, and Dr. Valerija Raulinaitis

With her newly obtained law degree, Payton was hired at the law firm Covington & Burling in Washington, D.C. While there, she caught the attention of President Richard Nixon who hired her to sit on the White House Domestic Council staff in 1971. Her alma mater Stanford also elected her as an alumni-elect on their Board of Trustees. Payton was later appointed to Chief Counsel of the Urban Mass Transportation Administration at the U.S. Department of Transportation in 1973.

In 1976, Payton and Christina B. Whitman were hired full-time at the University of Michigan Law School. The following year, she was elected to Stanford's board of trustees for a five-year term. During the Clinton presidency, she served as an adviser for the Clinton Health Care Reform Task Force, which led to her election as a fellow of the National Academy of Public Administration.

On May 28, 2008, Payton was reappointed the William W. Cook Professor of Law until May 31, 2013. Two years later, she was elected to the National Academy of Social Insurance and a Senior Fellow of the Administrative Conference of the United States. In 2013, Payton officially retired from the University of Michigan Law School.
