= Thompson Media Group =

American-based think tank and publishing company

Thompson Media Group, LLC, originally established as Thompson Publishing Group, Inc. was founded in 1972 by Richard E. Thompson. Thompson Media Group is an American privately held media company that specializes in providing compliance, regulatory, and market information through its four operating units: Thompson Information Services, The Performance Institute & American Strategic Management Institute, AHC & BioWorld, and Sheshunoff Information Services, A.S. Pratt, & Alex Information (collectively, SIS). Thompson Media Group, LLC, is based in Washington, DC. Thompson Media Group LLC established their name during reorganization in 2011.

In 2013, Thompson sold its properties:

- AHC was sold to private investors and Lone Peak Capital Group
- The Performance Institute was sold to Robbins-Gioa Inc.
- Thompson Information Services was sold to Columbia Books & Information Services.
- BioWorld and Medical Device Daily were sold to Thomson Reuters
- Sheshunoff and A.S. Pratt were sold to LexisNexis

== Background ==
Thompson Publishing Group was a privately held law and education books publishing company that was founded in 1972 by Richard E. Thompson under the name of Thompson Publishing Group and based in Washington, DC. The Group published subscription-based regulatory & compliance information. Thompson filed for bankruptcy in 2010 and was reorganized under the name Thompson Media Group LLC (TMG) in 2011 and dissolved in 2013 through sale of its various properties to various private investors and other publishing companies.

=== The Performance Institute and American Strategic Management Institute ===
In 2007, Thompson Publishing Group, now Thompson Media Group acquired The Performance Institute and The American Strategic Management Institute from founder Carl DeMaio. The Performance Institute is a private, non-partisan think-tank in the United States that specializes in improving government results through the principles of performance, transparency and accountability.

=== AHC Media ===
In August 2006, Thompson Publishing Group acquired a leading provider of healthcare information products AHC Media. AHC Media operates as a publisher of health care newsletters in the fields of clinical medicine, health care management, biotechnology, and medical devices. The company was founded in 1974 and is based in Atlanta, Georgia. AHC also provides accredited continuing education for physicians, nurses, & pharmacists. The combined company has a diverse portfolio of publications and services representing more than 350 print and electronic products as well as hundreds of conferences serving approximately 135,000 customers.

=== Sheshunoff | Pratt ===
In 2005, Thompson Publishing Group acquired Sheshunoff Information Services (SIS; Austin, TX) from company founders Gabrielle Sheshunoff, other management and investment firm Austin Ventures (Austin, TX).

In 2013, LexisNexis, together with Reed Elsevier Properties SA, acquired publishing brands and businesses of Sheshunoff and A.S. Pratt from Thompson Media Group.

Sheshunoff Information Services, A.S. Pratt, & Alex Information (collectively, SIS), founded in 1972, is a print and electronic publishing company that provides information to financial and legal professionals in the banking industry, as well as online training and solutions for financial institutions. SIS was founded in 1971 by Alex and Gabrielle Sheshunoff. The company became recognized for providing guidance and analysis to the banking industry. In 1988 Thomson Media, a division Thomson Reuters, acquired the company. Separately, the Sheshunoffs began publishing Alex Information products.

In 1995 SIS acquired A.S. Pratt & Sons. Established in 1933, "Pratt's Letter" is believed to be the second oldest continuously published newsletter in the country behind "Kiplinger's Washington Letter," which began publication in 1923. A.S. Pratt is a provider of regulatory law and compliance work solutions for the financial services industry.

Gabrielle Sheshunoff returned in 2004 to unite the AlexInformation, Sheshunoff, and A.S. Pratt brands before it was sold to Thompson in 2008.

== Summary of Publishing Activities prior to Dissolution ==
Thompson provided regulatory compliance information for professionals in business and government through books, loose-leaf, newsletters, audio conferences, Web subscription products, and email advisory alerts. The company also operated HR Compliance Online.com, an online solution for HR and benefits administrators that provide information on fair labor standards act, domestic partner benefits, family and medical leave act, workplace retaliation, consumer-directed health care, Americans with disabilities act, 401(k) plans, fringe benefits, employee handbooks, and flex benefits.

Thompson published books that focused on regulatory compliance advice for professionals in health care, human resources and other industries. Their predominant areas of publishing were:

- Human Resources
- Grants
- Education, including Title I
- Food and Drug Administration
- Environment Compliance and Energy
- Health Care
- Broadband Regulation
- Finance & Securities Regulation

== See also ==
- Good government organizations in the United States
