= IBM Center for The Business of Government =

American think tank

IBM Center for The Business of Government logo

The IBM Center for The Business of Government is an independent business think tank that focuses on management issues in the U.S. Federal government. Founded in 2002, the Center is located in Washington, D.C.

The center funds independent third-party research, publishes a bi-annual magazine, produces a weekly radio interview program, convenes discussions with practitioners and academics, and hosts forums and other online content. Its aim is to promoted "thought leadership that focuses on public management issues facing government executives at all levels".

== History ==
The Center was established in 1998 as the PriceWaterhouseCoopers Endowment for The Business of Government. In 2002, IBM acquired the management consulting arm of PricewaterhouseCoopers, and the Center was renamed. Since 2012, the Center has been led by Executive Director Dan Chenok, a former career federal executive for information policy and technology at the Office of Management and Budget (OMB).

== Research and publications ==
"Unlike traditional scholarly outlets, the IBM Center makes explicitly clear that its reports are to be ‘written for government executives and managers’ and that in making the decision to fund research proposals, it looks for very practical findings and recommendations—not just theory and concepts—in order to assist executives and managers to more effectively respond to mission and management challenges."

Since its inception, the center has published more than 250 research reports and books in areas such as public sector management and performance, technology and innovation, security and privacy, acquisition and procurement, and citizen engagement. Reports are commissioned through a competitive funding process which occurs twice a year, in the spring and fall.

Funded researchers have included academics from top schools of public management and business at Harvard University, the London School of Economics, Syracuse University and Johns Hopkins University.

=== Recent research interests ===
- Leading in an era of complex challenges
- Managing collaboration and connectivity
- Using data and analytics to make better decisions
- Pursuing cost savings and improving performance
- Identifying acquisition approaches that engage the private sector more effectively
- Managing risks and responding to threats in today’s security environment
- Providing insights for the presidential transition from campaigning to governing

== Publications ==
- The Business of Government Magazine – This bi-annual magazine features interviews with and profiles of government leaders as well as topical articles on management issues facing public sector executives. It also provides summaries of recent reports, radio interviews and events.
- Seven Management Imperatives – This report identifies seven societal trends that governments will have to manage and the imperatives that will drive governments to manage differently, including performance improvement and greater collaboration with the private sector.
- Ten Challenges Facing Public Managers – This report outlines a set of management issues that government executives will face in the coming years. These are ten “big challenges” for the decade ahead that include not only fiscal concerns of the Government Accounting Office but also the role of results, the impending crisis of competence and the blurring of boundaries in delivering services.
- Six Trends Transforming Government – This report identifies six trends that are leading to improved government performance. These trends, often in combination with one another, make it more likely that government will be able to successfully respond to the ever-increasing and complex challenges it faces today and that it will continue to face in the future.
- Operators Manual for the Next Administration and Getting It Done – The handbook, Operator’s Manual for the Next Administration, is aimed at senior management, while Getting It Done is billed as a guide for government executives. The books offer tips on managing the confirmation process, learning about federal agencies and how they work, assembling a leadership team, and developing a vision and an agenda.
- The IBM Center Blog. Articles written by center staff and posted to their blog are often syndicated, excerpted or quoted in government-oriented media platforms, such as AOL Gov, Government Executive, Federal Times, Federal Computer Week, and Government Computer News.
- Governing in the Next Four Years. The series examine issues facing the new presidential term. It began with several publications in 2004 and continued in 2007, when Center Senior Fellow John Kamensky began writing a Presidential Transition blog that has been cited in the US and overseas.

== The Business of Government Hour ==
The weekly radio program The Business of Government Hour interviews government executives . As a platform for government executives to discuss their careers, agencies and agency accomplishments, as well as their vision of government in the 21st century, the program provides a forum for government leaders to highlight key initiatives, management challenges and successes.

The Business of Government Hour has interviewed more than 300 government executives from deputy secretaries to C-Suite executives from a range of federal agencies, as well as state and local government executives.

The show has interviewed such government executives and thought leaders as Admiral Thad Allen, Dr. Francis Collins, Dr. Anthony Fauci, Governor Tim Kaine, Dr. Raymond Orbach, Dr. Robert Braun, Dr. Kathleen Merrigan, General Michael Hayden, General James Clapper, Robert F. Hale, David Walker, Gene Dodaro, Michael Astrue, Ambassador Elizabeth Frawley Bagley, Craig Fugate, Alec Ross, Tom Allen, General Tony Zinni and Professor Joseph Nye.

== See also ==
- Good government organizations in the United States
