= The Samuel and Ronnie Heyman Center on Corporate Governance =

American law research center within the Benjamin N. Cardozo School of Law

- Abbreviation: Heyman Center
- Named after: Samuel and Ronnie Heyman
- Type: Academic research center
- Purpose: Research of business and corporate law in America
- Location: New York City, United States
- Region served: United States
- Services: Symposia and lectures
- Fields: Securities law
- Executive Director: Fabian Eichentopf
- Parent organization: Cardozo School of Law
- Funding: Donations
- Website: Official site

The Samuel and Ronnie Heyman Center on Corporate Governance is an academic research center whose mission is to raise public and academic awareness of current corporate and securities law issues, to produce and disseminate research on a broad range of topics in these fields, and to educate and train students and professionals. The Heyman Center is part of the Benjamin N. Cardozo School of Law, located at 55 Fifth Avenue in the Union Square area of New York City.

The Heyman Center sponsors and organizes a variety of symposia and lectures by business and political leaders and legal scholars. The center hosts annual programs focusing on current issues in corporate restructurings.

== History ==
At the Third Annual Perspectives in Corporate Restructurings Conference: Corporate Restructurings in a Difficult Market on April 9, 2008, billionaire investor Wilbur L. Ross delivered a keynote address, providing his views on the current credit crisis and the outlook for investors.

The Heyman Center and the Securities Industry and Financial Markets Association Compliance and Legal Division (SIFMA-CL) have a cooperative relationship to hold a series of programs each year at The Heyman Center on issues related to the securities industry. This relationship has produced the public programs such as Attorneys as Gatekeepers, Future of the Securities Markets, Fraud and Federalism, Corporate Trouble, Regulating Financial Markets by Rules or Principles, and Debating the Merits of Prudential Supervision.

Other notable figures that have spoken at The Heyman Center public programs includes Mark A. Belnick, former Tyco International general counsel, Charlie Rose, Emmy award-winning journalist who interviewed hedge fund investor T. Boone Pickens on shareholder activism, and legendary investor Warren Buffett, CEO of Berkshire Hathaway.

In 2008, Professor Eric J. Pan was the director of The Heyman Center. He was an associate professor of law at the Benjamin N. Cardozo School of Law in New York City, where he was the director of The Samuel and Ronnie Heyman Center on Corporate Governance and an associate fellow in the international economics program of the Royal Institute of International Affairs in London. He specialized in corporate, securities and international law with a particular focus on international financial regulation and the operation of financial markets.
