= Partnership for Public Service =

American non-profit organization

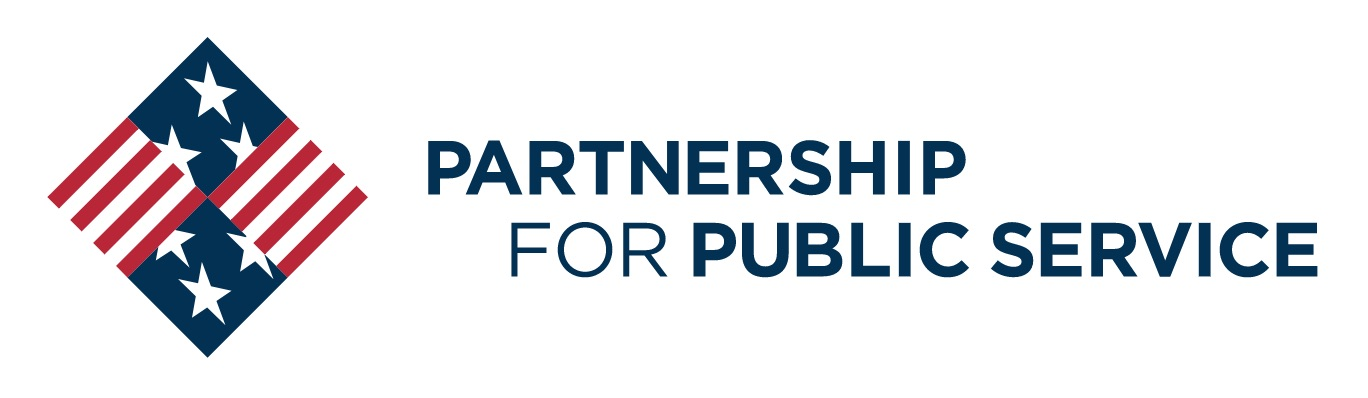
- Abbreviation: The Partnership
- Formation: 2001; 25 years ago
- Founder: Samuel J. Heyman
- Type: Good Government Nonprofit
- Headquarters: 600 14th Street NW
- Location: Washington, D.C.
- CEO and President: Max Stier
- Website: ourpublicservice.org

The Partnership for Public Service is a nonprofit, nonpartisan organization based in Washington, D.C. whose mission is to inspire a new generation of civil servants and to transform the way government works.

The Partnership's programs include the Samuel J. Heyman Service to America Medals, an annual event that honors federal employees for their exceptional civil service, the Center for Presidential Transition, a nonpartisan resource for presidential candidates and their transition teams, the Best Places to Work in the Federal Government Rankings, an annual survey that ranks federal agencies based on employee satisfaction, and Go Government, an informational site to help prospective civil servants find federal employment. Samuel J. Heyman and his wife Ronnie F. Heyman founded the Partnership in 2001. Max Stier is the CEO and President of the organization.

== History ==
The Partnership was founded by New York businessman Samuel J. Heyman in 2001 with a goal to attract talent to the federal workforce. Heyman founded the group in 2001 with a gift of $25 million. In 2006, he committed an additional $20 million over the next five years.

Heyman began his career at the Justice Department under Robert F. Kennedy after graduating from Harvard Law in 1963. Many years after his move into the private sector, Heyman created the Partnership.

== Publications ==
The Partnership's research publications explore topics related to government effectiveness and forward-thinking solutions to transforming the way government works. The hundreds of research reports on government reform issues delve into the most important challenges confronting government operations.

Research reports include:

- Government for the People: Serving the Public in a New World
- A Time for Talent: Improving Federal Recruiting and Hiring
- Into the Storm: Using Artificial Intelligence to Improve California’s Disaster Resilience
- Mastering Risk: Ways to Advance Enterprise Risk Management Across Government
- Cracking the Code: Harnessing the Exponential Power of Technology

We the Partnership is the organization's blog. Blog posts report on recommendations for federal agencies, common issues in government effectiveness, Partnership events and initiatives, and general announcements.

The Partnership also publishes annual progress reports, informative resources, leadership models, guidebooks, such as the 2020 Presidential Transition Guide, congressional testimonies, such as CEO Max Stier's written testimony for the National Commission on Military, National and Public Service, and commentaries such as the Partnership's statement on GSA ascertainment.

== Policy influence ==
The Partnership supports advocates for system reforms, supports federal leaders and institutions as they respond to challenges, and encourages congressional oversight and legislative action to improve federal workforce management. Thus, Partnership representatives frequently testify on Capitol Hill and support legislation to improve the civil service. The Chief Human Capital Officers Act that established senior human capital leaders in major federal agencies, the scholarship-for-service Roosevelt Scholars Act, the Federal Hiring Process Improvement Act, and the expansion of the Presidential Transition Act were all influenced by Partnership initiatives.

== The Samuel J. Heyman Service to America Medals ==
The Samuel J. Heyman Service to America Medals program, otherwise known as "The Sammies", was established in 2002 and honors outstanding federal employees who have made significant contributions to address the country's most daunting challenges. Named for the Partnership for Public Service’s late founder Samuel J. Heyman, who was inspired by President Kennedy’s call to serve in 1963, these awards align with his vision of a dynamic and innovative federal workforce that meets the needs of the American people.

The rigorous selection process convenes national leaders representing government, business, entertainment, media, and the non-profit/foundation community. This selection committee evaluates nominees based on their commitment to federal service, how their accomplishments meet the needs of the American people, and their excellence in customer service to citizens or other beneficiaries.

An award winner is selected for each of the following categories:

- Federal Employee of the Year
- Career Achievement
- Emerging Leaders
- Management Excellence
- Safety, Security and International Affairs
- Science and Environment

Notable medal recipients include 2020 Federal Employee of the Year winner Dr. Anthony Fauci, 2020 Spirit of Service winner Satya Nadella, 2019 Management Excellence winner Robert Cabana, and 2017 Science and Environment winner Rory A. Cooper.

== Center for Presidential Transition ==
The Partnership's Center for Presidential Transition is a nonpartisan source of information and resources designed to help presidential candidates and their transition teams prepare for their first term or second term in office. The Center aims to assist with organizing and executing a transition, help career officials in federal agencies prepare for new political leadership, help aspiring political appointees prepare for government leadership, engage with Congress to expand legislative transition reforms, and offer insights to help incumbent presidents prepare for a second term or for smooth transfer of power in the event that a new president is elected.

The Center Advisory Board includes Josh Bolten, former Chief of Staff to President George W. Bush, Mack McLarty, former Chief of Staff to President Bill Clinton, Michael Leavitt, former Governor of Utah, and Penny Pritzker, former Secretary of Commerce. They volunteer to support the Center for Presidential Transition by offering their experience on early transition planning for second-term and new administrations. Valerie Smith Boyd is the current director of the Center.

=== Ready to Serve ===
Ready to Serve is a centralized resource that guides candidates through the political appointment process. The Center launched Ready Serve to prepare aspiring political appointees for job hunting in a new or second-term administration and preparing for background checks and security clearances, financial disclosure, and Senate confirmation hearings.

=== Transition Lab ===
David Marchick, former director of the Center for Presidential Transition, hosted the Center's podcast Transition Lab until its conclusion in January 2021. He invited former presidential chiefs of staff, transition team leads and other presidential transition experts to share their experiences each week. The podcast was created to inform the public about the importance of a robust transition effort educate listeners on what needs to happen before a president takes office or starts a second term.

=== The Washington Post Appointee Tracker ===
The Partnership collaborates with The Washington Post to produce a political appointee tracker searchable database. Executive branch nominations through the Senate-confirmation process include positions like Cabinet secretaries, deputy and assistant secretaries, chief financial officers, general counsel, heads of agencies, ambassadors and other critical leadership positions.

== Go Government ==
The Go Government website guide aspiring public servants as they consider, apply for, and secure federal employment. Information, research, and reports on federal agencies and government careers are provided, as well as practical tips for completing government applications.

The United States government is the nation’s largest employer with nearly two million civilian employees. The federal government has positions in many fields, and the partnership allows job seekers to explore how people in various fields serve in the federal workforce.

== Best Places to Work in the Federal Government ==
The annual Best Places to Work in the Federal Government rankings are produced by the Partnership for Public Service and Boston Consulting Group. These rankings measure employee engagement government-wide as well as at individual departments and agencies. The rankings seek to hold government leadership accountable for the health of their organizations, and shine the spotlight on agencies that are successfully engaging employees as well as on those that are falling short.

== Other programs ==
The Partnership for Public Service announced the launch of Partnership West in 2020, which will extend the Partnership’s operations to the West Coast, starting in California. California grapples with concerns such as the COVID-19 pandemic and the wildfires ravaging the state. It needs a rich pool of mission-oriented federal employees skilled in supporting both state and local governments and building new cross-sector networks. Partnership West will use the Partnership’s expertise to help foster collaborative federal offices in California. The new initiative aim to support California agency field offices through research, cross-agency initiatives and customized programming in three main areas: federal talent pipelines, agency networks, collaboration and innovation, and leadership development.

In 2021, the Partnership's Alliance for Congress will address legislative concerns facing the United States government.

== Finance and external stakeholders ==
ProPublica reports the organization took in $14,394,406 Total Revenue in 2015, and revenue over the previous 5 years fluctuated between approximately $8.5 million and $17.0 million. 2015 Revenues were 49% from "Program Services," 44% from "Contributions," and the rest spread across multiple other sources.

Corporate sponsors (44 listed in March 2018) dominate its lists of affiliates and supporters. The organization reports that "The Partnership receives support from and collaborates with corporations that share our commitment to effective government. Their generous support makes our work possible." These sponsors included some of the nation's leading accounting-and-consulting firms, investment banks, defense contractors, and others with heavy involvement with—and/or regulatory sensitivity to—federal and state governments. By comparison, few academic, civic or labor organizations are listed.

Many of the Partnership's programs are made possible through foundation support. Notable examples include the Annenberg Foundation, which has funded the Annenberg Leadership Seminars, Annenberg Speakers Bureau and other projects. In 2016, the Annenberg Foundation awarded a $4 million grant, over 4 years, to the Partnership for various programs named for Mr. & Mrs. Annenberg.

The Partnership works with other philanthropic foundations that focus on public service issues such as the Rockefeller Brothers Fund, the Peterson Foundation, and Atlantic Philanthropies, among others.

In addition, the Partnership receives support from many private-sector companies who sponsor programs, projects and events. National sponsors for the 2009 Sammies included GEICO, DuPont and the Graduate School. The Partnership also works with corporate partners on its many research projects. In 2009, the Partnership and Booz Allen Hamilton collaborated to produce reports analyzing the challenges facing the federal cybersecurity workforce and examining the state of the Senior Executive Service. Monster Government Solutions and Aon Consulting provided support for the Partnership's Where the Jobs Are 2009 report. In a second collaboration with Booz Allen Hamilton in 2014, the Partnership published a report entitled "Building the Enterprise: A New Civil Service Framework," which calls for major reforms to the federal government's decades-old civil service system and lays out a plan to modernize areas that include the outdated pay and hiring policies.

== See also ==
- Good government organizations in the United States
