= List of law clerks for the third seat of the Supreme Court of the United States =

US Justices' assistants

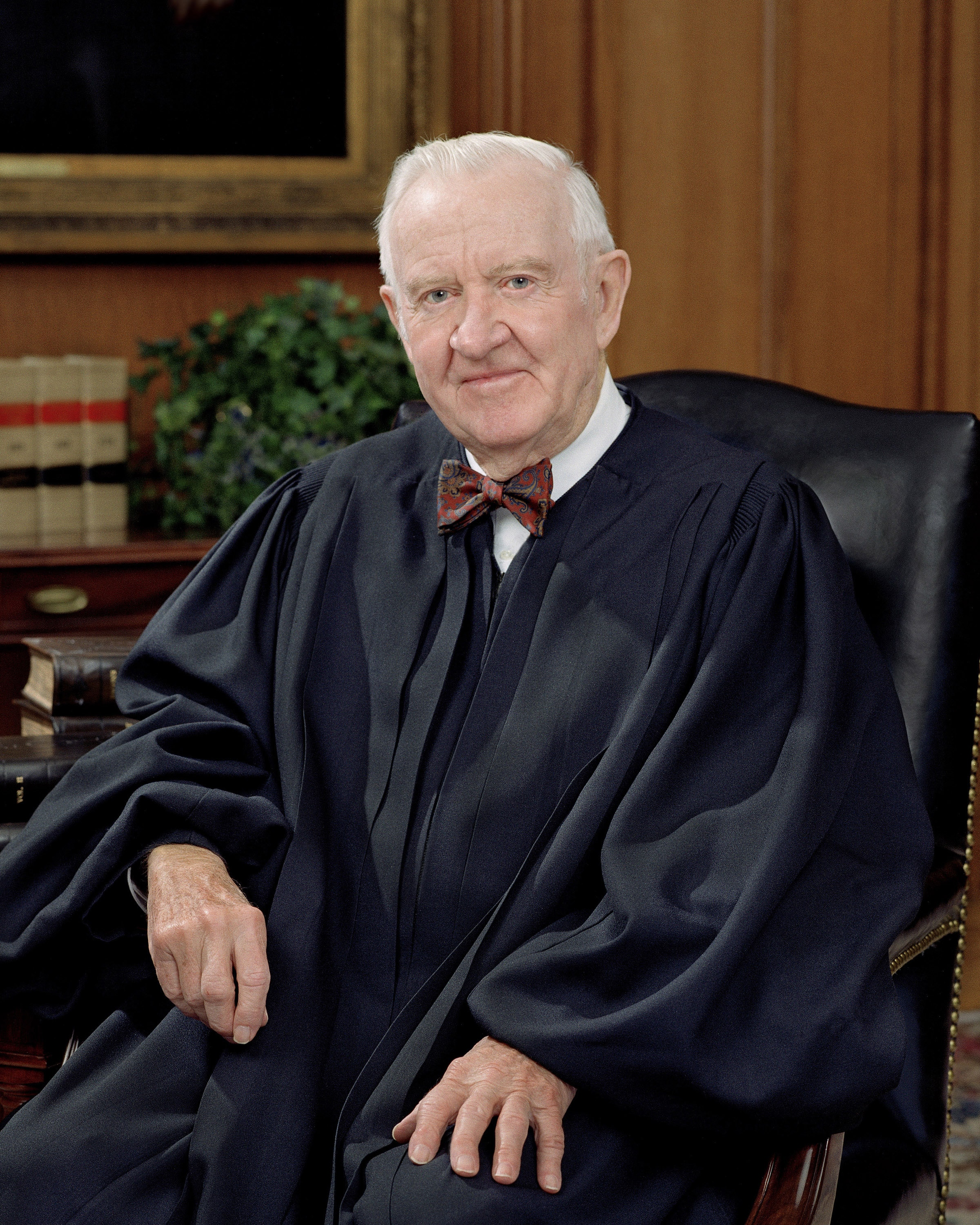
John Paul Stevens, 90th Associate Justice of the U.S. Supreme Court, clerked for Justice Wiley Rutledge during the 1947–48 term.

Law clerks have assisted the justices of the United States Supreme Court in various capacities since the first one was hired by Justice Horace Gray in 1882. Each justice is permitted to have three or four law clerks per Court term. Most persons serving in this capacity are recent law school graduates, and typically graduated at the top of their class.

Among their many functions, the clerks do legal research that assists justices in deciding what cases to accept and what questions to ask during oral arguments, prepare memoranda, and draft orders and opinions. After retiring from the Court, a justice may continue to employ a law clerk, who may be assigned to provide additional assistance to an active justice or may assist the retired justice when sitting by designation with a lower court.

Now and then, a clerk for a Supreme Court Justice might eventually become a justice themselves. Several of the justices of the Roberts Court were also clerking for the previous justices, such as Justice Neil Gorsuch who clerked for Justice Byron White and Justice Anthony Kennedy and Justice Ketanji Brown Jackson who clerked for Justice Stephen Breyer.

== Table of law clerks ==
The following is a table of law clerks serving the associate justice holding the third seat of the Supreme Court (the Court's third associate justice seat by the order of precedence of the inaugural associate justices (Note: Their place in the order of precedence was based upon the seniority of their commission from President George Washington following their confirmation by the U.S. Senate.)) which was established on September 24, 1789 by the 1st Congress through the Judiciary Act of 1789 (1 Stat. 73). This seat is currently occupied by Justice Sonia Sotomayor.

Seat 3 associate justices and law clerks

William Burnham Woods

January 5, 1881 –
May 14, 1887

Clerk	Started	Finished	School (year)	Previous clerkship

Lucius Q. C. Lamar

January 18, 1888 –
January 23, 1893

Clerk	Started	Finished	School (year)	Previous clerkship

Howell Edmunds Jackson

March 4, 1893 –
August 8, 1895

Clerk	Started	Finished	School (year)	Previous clerkship
Frederick Emmons Chapin		August 8, 1895	GW-Columbian (1888)	

Rufus W. Peckham

January 6, 1896 –
October 24, 1909

Clerk	Started	Finished	School (year)	Previous clerkship
Jesse C. Ball	1895	1904		
John E. Hoover	1904	1905		
S. Edward Widdifield	1904	1909	Detroit (c. 1898)	

Horace Harmon Lurton

January 3, 1910 –
July 12, 1914

Clerk	Started	Finished	School (year)	Previous clerkship
Harvey D. ("Harry") Jacob	1910	1914	Georgetown (1913)	

James Clark McReynolds

October 12, 1914 –
January 31, 1941

Clerk	Started	Finished	School (year)	Previous clerkship
Leroy E. Reed	1914	1915	Georgetown (1913)	
S. Milton Simpson	1915	1916	Georgetown (1913)	
Newman Blaine Mallan	1917	1918	Virginia (1916)	
T. Ellis Allison	1917	1918	Georgetown (1918)	C. Smyth (D.C. Cir.)
Harold L. George	1919	1920	Georgetown (1920)	
S. Milton Simpson	1919	1920	Georgetown (1913)	McReynolds
Carlyle Solomon Baer	1921	1922	Cumberland School of Law (1916)	
Tench T. Mayre	1921	1922	Georgetown (1911)	
Norman Burke Frost	1921	1922	Georgetown (1920)	
Andrew P. Federline	1922	1923		
Chester H. Gray	1926	1926	National (1925)	
John T. ("James") Fowler	1926	1931	Georgetown (1921)	
Maurice J. Mahoney	1927	1929	Georgetown (1925)	
Maurice J. Mahoney	1931	1934	Georgetown (1925)	
Ward Elgin Lattin	1934	1935	Georgetown (LLB 1932, JD 1937)	
J. Allan Sherier	1935	1936	Georgetown (1935)	
John Frush Knox	1936	1937	Northwestern (JD 1934) / Harvard (LLM 1936)	none
John T. McHale	1937	1938	Georgetown (c. 1914, did not graduate)	Van Devanter
Milton S. Musser	1938	1940	GW (1938)	N. Cayton (D.C. Municipal)
Raymond W. Radcliffe	1940	1940	National (LLB 1941, LLM 1943)	

James F. Byrnes

July 8, 1941 –
October 3, 1942

Clerk	Started	Finished	School (year)	Previous clerkship
James Edward Doyle	1941	1942	Columbia (1940)	
Victor Brudney	1942	October 3, 1942 (Byrnes resigned)	Columbia (1940)	

Wiley Blount Rutledge

February 15, 1943 –
September 10, 1949

Clerk	Started	Finished	School (year)	Previous clerkship
Victor Brudney	February 1943	1944	Columbia (1940)	Byrnes
Harry L. Shniderman	1944	1945	Harvard (1941)	
Richard F. Wolfson	1946	1947	Yale (1944)	
John Paul Stevens	1947	1948	Northwestern (1947)	none
Stanley L. Temko	1947	1948	Columbia (1943)	none
Louis H. Pollak	1948	1949	Yale (1948)	none
Philip W. Tone	1948	1949	Iowa (1948)	none
J. Keith Mann	1949	1949	Indiana (1949)	none

Sherman Minton

October 12, 1949 –
October 15, 1956

Clerk	Started	Finished	School (year)	Previous clerkship
J. Keith Mann	1949	1950	Indiana (1949)	Rutledge
Lawrence Russell Taylor, Jr.	1949	1950	Indiana (1949)	none
Charles D. Kelso	1950	1951	Chicago (1950)	none
Abner J. Mikva	1951	1952	Chicago (1951)	none
Raymond W. Gray, Jr.	1951	1952	Indiana (1951)	none
William K. Bachelder	1952	1953	Northwestern (1951)	
Harry L. Wallace	1952	1953	Harvard (1952)	none
Gerald Levenberg	1953	1954	Indiana (1953)	none
James R. Wimmer	1953	1954	Yale (1953)	none
Thomas Milton Lofton	1954	1955	Indiana (1954)	none
Samuel C. Butler	1954	1955	Harvard (1954)	none
Laurence Sherman Fordham	1954	1955	Harvard (1954)	none
Robert H. Cole	1955	1956	Harvard (1955)	none
Richard Tandy Conway	1955	1956	Indiana (1952)	none
Richard S. Rhodes	1956	1956	Indiana (1953)	none

William Brennan

October 16, 1956 –
July 20, 1990

Clerk	Started	Finished	School (year)	Previous clerkship
Richard S. Rhodes	1956	1957	Indiana (1953)	Minton
Clyde A. Szuch	1956	1957	Harvard (1955)	none
Edward W. Keane	1957	1958	Harvard (1957)	none
Daniel J. O'Hern	1957	1958	Harvard (1957)	none
Peter M. Fishbein	1958	1959	Harvard (1958)	none
Dennis G. Lyons	1958	1960	Harvard (1955)	none
Jeffrey L. ("Jerry") Nagin	1959	1960	Harvard (1959)	none
Richard S. Arnold	1960	1961	Harvard (1960)	none
Daniel A. Rezneck	1960	1961	Harvard (1959)	none
Frank I. Michelman	1961	1962	Harvard (1960)	none
Roy Arnold Schotland	1961	1962	Harvard (1960)	none
Robert M. O'Neil	1962	1963	Harvard (1961)	none
Richard A. Posner	1962	1963	Harvard (1962)	none
Stephen R. Barnett	1963	1964	Harvard (1962)	Friendly (2d Cir.)
Stephen J. Friedman	1963	1964	Harvard (1962)	none
S. Paul Posner	1964	1965	Harvard (1964)	none
William T. Finley, Jr.	1964	1965	Harvard (1964)	none
Owen M. Fiss	1965	1966	Harvard (1964)	T. Marshall (2d Cir.)
Peter L. Strauss	1965	1966	Yale (1964)	Bazelon (D.C. Cir.)
Stephen M. Goodman	1966	1967	Penn (1965)	Bazelon (D.C. Cir.)
Abraham D. Sofaer	1966	1967	NYU (1965)	J. S. Wright (D.C. Cir.)
Raymond C. Fisher	1967	1968	Stanford (1966)	J. S. Wright (D.C. Cir.)
Francis M. Gregory, Jr.	1967	1968	Notre Dame (1966)	McGowan (D.C. Cir.)
Joseph N. Onek	1968	1969	Yale (1967)	Bazelon (D.C. Cir.)
Robert M. Weinberg	1968	1969	Michigan (1968)	none
Richard M. Cooper	1969	1970	Harvard (1969)	none
W. Taylor Reveley, III	1969	1970	Virginia (1968)	none
Douglas A. Poe (hired by Burger)	1969	1970	Duke (1967)	
Loftus E. Becker	1970	1971	Penn (1969)	Bazelon (D.C. Cir.)
Richard Cotton	1970	1971	Yale (1969)	J. S. Wright (D.C. Cir.)
Michael C. Moran	1970	1971	Detroit (1969)	G. Edwards (6th Cir.)
C. Taylor Ashworth	1971	1972	Texas (1971)	
Gerald Goldman	1971	1972	Harvard (1968)	
Paul R. Hoeber	1971	1972	Berkeley (1970)	Browning (9th Cir.)
Edward R. Leahy	1972	1973	Boston College (1971)	Aldisert (3d Cir.)
William J. Maledon	1972	1973	Notre Dame (1972)	none
Gerald M. Rosberg	1972	1973	Harvard (1971)	Bazelon (D.C. Cir.)
Geoffrey R. Stone	1972	1973	Chicago (1971)	J. S. Wright (D.C. Cir.)
Thomas M. Jorde	1973	1974	Yale (1972)	Weigel (N.D. Cal.)
Lawrence B. Pedowitz	1973	1974	NYU (1972)	Friendly (2d Cir.)
Jordan A. Luke	1973	1974	Penn (1972)	Bazelon (D.C. Cir.)
Marsha Berzon	1974	1975	Berkeley (1973)	Browning (9th Cir.)
Steven P. Goldberg	1974	1975	Yale (1973)	Bazelon (D.C. Cir.)
Richard J. Bronstein	1975	1976	Chicago (1974)	S. Robinson (D.C. Cir.)
Stanley C. Fickle	1975	1976	Indiana (1974)	Eschbach (N.D. Ind.)
Barry S. Simon	1975	1976	Harvard (1974)	J. S. Wright (D.C. Cir.)
Alan B. Sternstein	1975	1976	Arizona (1975)	Douglas
Robert B. Shanks	1976	1977	Virginia (1975)	Tamm (D.C. Cir.)
William A. Fletcher	1976	1977	Yale (1975)	Weigel (N.D. Cal.)
Stuart J. Baskin	1976	1977	Stanford (1975)	Mansfield (2d Cir.)
Gerard E. Lynch	1976	1977	Columbia (1975)	Feinberg (2d Cir.)
David W. Carpenter	1977	1978	Boston University (1975)	Coffin (1st Cir.)
Carmen D. Legato	1977	1978	Catholic (1976)	Seitz (3d Cir.)
F. Whitten Peters	1977	1978	Harvard (1976)	J. S. Wright (D.C. Cir.)
Steven A. Reiss	1977	1978	Stanford (1976)	Wisdom (5th Cir.)
Merrick B. Garland	1978	1979	Harvard (1977)	Friendly (2d Cir.)
Robert C. Post	1978	1979	Yale (1977)	Bazelon (D.C. Cir.)
Daniel Michael Harris	1978	1979	Harvard (1977)	Browning (9th Cir.)
Peter Jonathon Busch	1978	1979	Virginia (1977)	Coffin (1st Cir.)
James Russel Bird	1978	1979	Chicago (1977)	J. S. Wright (D.C. Cir.)
Michael B. Chertoff	1979	1980	Harvard (1978)	Gurfein (2d Cir.)
Jeffrey J. Rosen	1979	1980	Harvard (1978)	J. S. Wright (D.C. Cir.)
Frederic D. Woocher	1979	1980	Stanford (1978)	Bazelon (D.C. Cir)
Jerold S. Kayden	1980	1981	Harvard (1979)	Oakes (2d Cir.)
Michael W. McConnell	1980	1981	Chicago (1979)	J. S. Wright (D.C. Cir.)
Michael Rubin	1980	1981	Georgetown (1977)	Renfrew (N.D. Cal.) / Browning (9th Cir.)
Elliot E. Polebaum	1980	1981	NYU (1977)	Oakes (2d Cir.)
Mark S. Campisano	1981	1982	Yale (1980)	Feinberg (2d Cir.)
Clifton S. Elgarten	1981	1982	Cardozo (1979)	L. Pollak (E.D. Pa.)
Frederick C. Lowinger	1981	1982	Chicago (1980)	J. S. Wright (D.C. Cir.)
Mary L. Mikva	1981	1982	Northwestern (1980)	P. Marshall (N.D. Ill.)
Perry Dane	1982	1983	Yale (1981)	Bazelon (D.C. Cir.)
Edward J. Kelly, III	1982	1983	Virginia (1981)	Haynsworth (4th Cir.)
John H. Schapiro	1982	1983	Stanford (1981)	J. S. Wright (D.C. Cir.)
Charles S. Treat	1982	1983	Chicago (1980)	Wisdom (5th Cir.)
Jeffrey B. Kindler	1983	1984	Harvard (1980)	Bazelon (D.C. Cir.)
Michael Klausner	1983	1984	Yale (1981)	Bazelon (D.C. Cir.)
Bruce R. Lerner	1983	1984	Penn (1982)	Mikva (D.C. Cir.)
John F. Savarese	1983	1984	Harvard (1981)	L. Pollak (E.D. Pa.)
Charles G. Curtis, Jr.	1984	1985	Chicago (1982)	Bazelon (D.C. Cir.)
James A. Feldman	1984	1985	Harvard (1983)	J. S. Wright (D.C. Cir.)
Michael D. Rips	1984	1985	GW (1982)	Politz (5th Cir.)
Donald B. Verrilli Jr.	1984	1985	Columbia (1983)	J. S. Wright (D.C. Cir.)
Rory Knox Little (shared with Stewart, Powell, Stevens)	1984	1985	Yale (1982)	Oberdorfer (D.D.C.)
Marie R. Deveney	1985	1986	Michigan (1984)	H. Edwards (D.C. Cir.)
Jay M. Fujitani	1985	1986	Berkeley (1984)	Weigel (N.D. Cal.)
Dean M. Hashimoto	1985	1986	Yale (1984)	Bazelon (D.C. Cir.)
Larry B. Kramer	1985	1986	Chicago (1984)	Friendly (2d Cir.)
Jeffrey Thomas Leeds	1985	1986	Harvard (1983)	none
Evan H. Caminker	1986	1987	Yale (1986)	W. Norris (9th Cir.)
Mark E. Haddad	1986	1987	Yale (1985)	L. Pollak (E.D. Pa.)
Milton C. Regan, Jr.	1986	1987	Georgetown (1985)	R. B. Ginsburg (D.C. Cir.)
Virginia A. Seitz (McLeese)	1986	1987	Buffalo (1985)	H. Edwards (D.C. Cir.)
Einer R. Elhauge	1987	1988	Harvard (1986)	W. Norris (9th Cir.)
Mark H. Epstein	1987	1988	Berkeley (1985)	Weigel (N.D. Cal.) / Panelli (Cal.)
Joseph R. Guerra	1987	1988	Georgetown (1985)	J. Green (D.D.C.)
E. Joshua Rosenkranz	1987	1988	Georgetown (1986)	Scalia (D.C. Cir.) / S. Williams (D.C. Cir.)
Timothy S. Bishop	1988	1989	Northwestern (1985)	Oakes (2d Cir.)
Lisa E. Heinzerling	1988	1989	Chicago (1987)	Posner (7th Cir.)
John M. West	1988	1989	Michigan (1987)	H. Edwards (D.C. Cir.)
Eric P. Rakowski	1988	1989	Harvard (1987)	H. Edwards (D.C. Cir.)
Nory Miller	1989	1990	Columbia (1988)	Mikva (D.C. Cir.)
Regina Grace Maloney	1989	1990	Georgetown (1988)	
Jonathan S. Massey	1989	1990	Harvard (1988)	Mikva (D.C. Cir.)
James E. Castello (shared with Marshall)	1990	1991	Berkeley (1986)	Mikva (D.C. Cir.)
Hugh W. Baxter (shared with Blackmun)	1991	1992	Stanford (1990)	R. B. Ginsburg (D.C. Cir.)
Julius Genachowski (shared with Souter)	1992	1993	Harvard (1991)	Mikva (D.C. Cir.)
Steven G. Krone (shared with Souter)	1993	1994	Chicago (1992)	Mikva (D.C. Cir.)
Lawrence A. Kasten (shared with Souter)	1994	1995	GW (1992)	Schroeder (9th Cir.)
Steven L. Chanenson (shared with Souter)	1995	1996	Chicago (1992)	Kravitch (11th Cir.)
Paul F. Washington (shared with Souter)	1996	1997	Fordham (1995)	Tatel (D.C. Cir.)

David Souter

October 9, 1990 –
June 29, 2009

Clerk	Started	Finished	School (year)	Previous clerkship
Meir Feder	1990	1991	Harvard (1989)	W. Norris (9th Cir.)
John J. Sullivan	1990	1991	Columbia (1985)	Wisdom (5th Cir.)
Paul E. Salamanca	1990	1991	Boston College (1989)	Souter (1st Cir.)
Peter J. Spiro	1990	1991	Virginia (1987)	S. Williams (D.C. Cir.)
William D. Araiza	1991	1992	Yale (1990)	W. Norris (9th Cir.)
Henk J. Brands	1991	1992	Columbia (1989)	S. Breyer (1st Cir.)
Jonathan E. Nuechterlein	1991	1992	Yale (1990)	S. Williams (D.C. Cir.)
Peter J. Rubin	1991	1993	Harvard (1988)	Seitz (3d Cir.)
Robert Frank Brauneis	1992	1993	Harvard (1989)	S. Breyer (1st Cir.)
Steven M. Dunne	1992	1993	Stanford (1990)	S. Williams (D.C. Cir.)
Mark L. Movsesian	1992	1993	Harvard (1988)	H. Winter (4th Cir.)
Julius Genachowski (shared with Brennan)	1992	1993	Harvard (1991)	Mikva (D.C. Cir.)
Michael S. Barr	1993	1994	Yale (1992)	Leval (S.D.N.Y.)
Julius Genachowski	1993	1994	Harvard (1991)	Brennan
David T. Goldberg	1993	1994	Harvard (1991)	R. B. Ginsburg (D.C. Cir.)
Steven G. Krone (shared with Brennan)	1993	1994	Chicago (1992)	Mikva (D.C. Cir.)
Alison M. Tucher	1993	1994	Stanford (1992)	W. Norris (9th Cir.)
H. Kent Greenfield	1994	1995	Chicago (1992)	L. Campbell (1st Cir.)
Daniel H. Halberstam	1994	1995	Yale (1993)	Wald (D.C. Cir.)
Riyaz A. Kanji	1994	1995	Yale (1991)	B. Fletcher (9th Cir.)
Max I. Stier	1994	1995	Stanford (1992)	Oakes (2d Cir.)
Lawrence A. Kasten (shared with Brennan)	1994	1995	GW (1992)	Schroeder (9th Cir.)
Stuart M. Benjamin	1995	1996	Yale (1991)	Canby (9th Cir.)
Steven L. Chanenson (shared with Brennan)	1995	1996	Chicago (1992)	Kravitch (11th Cir.)
Heather K. Gerken	1995	1996	Michigan (1994)	Reinhardt (9th Cir.)
Craig T. Goldblatt	1995	1996	Chicago (1993)	Cudahy (7th Cir.)
Ernest A. Young	1995	1996	Harvard (1993)	Boudin (1st Cir.)
William M. Hohengarten	1996	1997	Yale (1994)	Newman (2d Cir.)
Ellen D. Katz	1996	1997	Yale (1994)	J. A. W. Rogers (D.C. Cir.)
Gerald F. Leonard	1996	1997	Michigan (1995)	J. D. Phillips (4th Cir.)
Timothy J. Simeone	1996	1997	Chicago (1994)	Wald (D.C. Cir.)
Paul F. Washington (shared with Brennan)	1996	1997	Fordham (1995)	Tatel (D.C. Cir.)
Thomas B. Colby	1997	1998	Harvard (1996)	Calabresi (2d Cir.)
Deborah L. Hamilton	1997	1998	Michigan (1996)	H. Edwards (D.C. Cir.)
Mary-Rose Papandrea	1997	1998	Chicago (1995)	D. Ginsburg (D.C. Cir.) / Koeltl (S.D.N.Y.)
Jonathan G. Cedarbaum	1998	1999	Yale (1996)	Tatel (D.C. Cir.)
Nestor M. Davidson	1998	1999	Columbia (1997)	Tatel (D.C. Cir.)
Noah R. Feldman	1998	1999	Yale (1997)	H. Edwards (D.C. Cir.)
Catherine M. Sharkey	1998	1999	Yale (1997)	Calabresi (2d Cir.)
Jay L. Koh	1999	2000	Yale (1998)	Boudin (1st Cir.)
Benjamin L. Liebman	1999	2000	Harvard (1998)	S. Lynch (1st Cir.)
Kermit Roosevelt III	1999	2000	Yale (1997)	S. Williams (D.C. Cir.)
Rebecca L. Tushnet	1999	2000	Yale (1998)	Becker (3d Cir.)
Kevin Newsom	2000	2001	Harvard (1997)	O'Scannlain (9th Cir.)
Kenneth A. Bamberger	2000	2001	Harvard (1998)	Kearse (2d Cir.)
Molly Shaffer Van Houweling	2000	2001	Harvard (1998)	Boudin (1st Cir.)
Matthew C. Waxman	2000	2001	Yale (1998)	Flaum (7th Cir.)
Benjamin Gruenstein	2001	2002	Harvard (1999)	S. Williams (D.C. Cir.)
Thomas H. Lee	2001	2002	Harvard (2000)	Boudin (1st Cir.)
Ann M. Lipton	2001	2002	Harvard (2000)	Becker (3d Cir.)
Monica W. Rothbaum	2001	2002	NYU (1999)	H. Edwards (D.C. Cir.)
Mark C. Fleming	2002	2003	Harvard (1997)	Boudin (1st Cir.)
Jesse M. Furman	2002	2003	Yale (1998)	Cabranes (2d Cir.)
Derek T. Ho	2002	2003	Harvard (2001)	Boudin (1st Cir.)
Sarah L. Levine	2002	2003	Yale (2000)	H. Edwards (D.C. Cir.)
Julian D. Mortenson	2003	2004	Stanford (2002)	Wilkinson (4th Cir.)
Samuel J. Rascoff	2003	2004	Yale (2001)	Leval (2d Cir.)
Jeannie C. Suk (Gersen)	2003	2004	Harvard (2002)	H. Edwards (D.C. Cir.)
Gregory G. Rapawy	2003	2004	Harvard (2001)	S. Lynch (1st Cir.)
Catherine M.A. Carroll	2004	2005	Michigan (2002)	H. Edwards (D.C. Cir.)
Matthew S. Hellman	2004	2005	Harvard (2002)	Boudin (1st Cir.)
Christine B. Van Aken	2004	2005	NYU (2002)	Leval (2d Cir.)
Daniel S. Volchok	2004	2005	Harvard (2003)	Tatel (D.C. Cir.)
Jeanne Fromer	2005	2006	Harvard (2002)	Sack (2d Cir.)
Meaghan McLaine (VerGow)	2005	2006	Harvard (2004)	Garland (D.C. Cir.)
Jon D. Michaels	2005	2006	Yale (2003)	Calabresi (2d Cir.)
Allison Orr (Larsen)	2005	2006	Virginia (2004)	Wilkinson (4th Cir.)
Boris Bershteyn	2006	2007	Yale (2004)	Cabranes (2d Cir.)
David S. Han	2006	2007	Harvard (2005)	Boudin (1st Cir.)
Bryan Leach	2006	2007	Yale (2005)	Cabranes (2d Cir.)
Daniel B. Tenny	2006	2007	Michigan (2005)	Tatel (D.C. Cir.)
Bert I. Huang	2007	2008	Harvard (2003)	Boudin (1st Cir.)
Leslie Carolyn Kendrick	2007	2008	Virginia (2006)	Wilkinson (4th Cir.)
Michael J. Mongan	2007	2008	Stanford (2006)	Garland (D.C. Cir.)
Micah W. J. Smith	2007	2008	Harvard (2006)	Calabresi (2d Cir.)
Erin Delaney (Lenkner)	2008	2009	NYU (2007)	Calabresi (2d Cir.)
Michael S. Gerber	2008	2009	Yale (2005)	Leval (2d Cir.)
Warren D. Postman	2008	2009	Harvard (2007)	W. Fletcher (9th Cir.)
Noah G. Purcell	2008	2009	Harvard (2007)	Tatel (D.C. Cir.)
Thomas G. Pulham (shared with Breyer)	2009	2010	Yale (2004)	Katzmann (2d Cir.) / Cote (S.D.N.Y.)
Brook Hopkins (shared with Breyer)	2010	2011	Harvard (2007)	Reinhardt (9th Cir.)
Matthew J. Tokson (shared with Ginsburg)	2011	2012	Chicago (2008)	Randolph (D.C. Cir.)
Anthony Vitarelli (shared with Breyer)	2012	2013	Yale (2009)	Griffith (D.C. Cir.)
Ryan Y. Park (shared with Ginsburg)	2013	2014	Harvard (2010)	Katzmann (2d Cir.) / Rakoff (S.D.N.Y.)
Arpit K. Garg (shared with Breyer)	2014	2015	Yale (2012)	Reinhardt (9th Cir.) / Cote (S.D.N.Y.)
Samuel Philip Rothschild (shared with Ginsburg)	2015	2016	Columbia (2013)	Boudin (1st Cir.) / Cote (S.D.N.Y.)
Edwina B. Clarke (shared with Breyer)	2016	2017	Yale (2013)	Reinhardt (9th Cir.) / Oetken (S.D.N.Y.) / Barron (1st Cir.)
Adam Liron Goodman (shared with Ginsburg)	2017	2018	Harvard (2013)	Rakoff (S.D.N.Y.) / Katzmann (2d Cir.)
Sundeep Iyer (shared with Breyer)	2018	2019	Yale (2016)	Kavanaugh (D.C. Cir.)
Mark Jia (shared with Ginsburg)	2019	2020	Harvard (2016)	W. Fletcher (9th Cir.)

Sonia Sotomayor

August 8, 2009 –
Incumbent

Clerk	Started	Finished	School (year)	Previous clerkship
Jeremy C. Marwell	2009	2010	NYU (2006)	S. Williams (D.C. Cir.)
Eloise Hilary Pasachoff (Glaisyer)	2009	2010	Harvard (2004)	Katzmann (2d Cir.) / Rakoff (S.D.N.Y.)
Lindsey E. Powell	2009	2010	Stanford (2007)	Stevens / Garland (D.C. Cir.)
Robert M. Yablon	2009	2010	Yale (2006)	R. B. Ginsburg / W. Fletcher (9th Cir.)
Kevin P. Arlyck	2010	2011	NYU (2008)	Katzmann (2d Cir.)
Thomas S. Lue	2010	2011	Harvard (2005)	Raggi (2d Cir.) / G. Lynch (S.D.N.Y.)
Abby M. Mollen	2010	2011	Northwestern (2008)	Tatel (D.C. Cir.)
Amy M. Mason (Saharia)	2010	2011	Duke (2005)	Newman (2d Cir.) / Chatigny (D. Conn.)
Kristen E. Eichensehr (shared with O'Connor)	2010	2011	Yale (2008)	Garland (D.C. Cir.)
Michael E. Bern	2011	2012	Harvard (2008)	McConnell (10th Cir.)
Mark A. Hiller	2011	2012	Virginia (2009)	Sack (2d Cir.)
Daniel G. Habib	2011	2012	Yale (2010)	W. Fletcher (9th Cir.)
Jane Emma Kucera (Nitze)	2011	2012	Harvard (2008)	Gorsuch (10th Cir.)
Candice Chiu (Wong) (shared with O'Connor)	2011	2012	Harvard (2008)	Kavanaugh (D.C. Cir.)
Brian Timothy Burgess	2012	2013	NYU (2009)	Tatel (D.C. Cir.) / Calabresi (2d Cir.)
Brian P. Goldman	2012	2013	Stanford (2010)	Reinhardt (9th Cir.)
Scott Stewart Grinsell	2012	2013	Yale (2009)	Pooler (2d Cir.)
Charlotte H. Taylor	2012	2013	NYU (2008)	Katzmann (2d Cir.) / Rakoff (S.D.N.Y.)
Eduardo F. Bruera (shared with Stevens)	2012	2013	Cornell (2011)	C. King (5th Cir.)
Fred O. Smith, Jr.	2013	2014	Stanford (2007)	B. Parker (2d Cir.) / M. Thompson (M.D. Al.)
Sparkle L. Sooknanan	2013	2014	Brooklyn (2010)	Calabresi (2d Cir.) / Vitaliano (E.D.N.Y.)
Aaron Y. Tang	2013	2014	Stanford (2011)	Wilkinson (4th Cir.)
Daniel Lee Winik	2013	2014	Yale (2011)	Reinhardt (9th Cir.)
Charles Luke McCloud	2014	2015	Harvard (2011)	Kavanaugh (D.C. Cir.) / Niemeyer (4th Cir.)
Michael C. Pollack	2014	2015	NYU (2011)	J.R. Brown (D.C. Cir.)
James R. Sigel	2014	2015	Harvard (2011)	Tatel (D.C. Cir.) / Liu (Cal.) / Reinhardt (9th Cir.)
Jennifer B. Sokoler	2014	2015	Columbia (2010)	Katzmann (2d Cir.) / Cote (S.D.N.Y.)
Easha Anand	2015	2016	Berkeley (2014)	Watford (9th Cir.)
Nikolas ("Niko") Bowie	2015	2016	Harvard (2014)	Sutton (6th Cir.)
Bridget A. Fahey	2015	2016	Yale (2014)	Kavanaugh (D.C. Cir.)
Matthew R. Shahabian	2015	2016	NYU (2011)	Katzmann (2d Cir.) / Rakoff (S.D.N.Y.)
Kirti Datla	2016	2017	NYU (2012)	Thapar (E.D. Ky.) / Sutton (6th Cir.)
Alex C. Hemmer	2016	2017	Yale (2014)	B. Fletcher (9th Cir.) / Moss (D.D.C.)
Kamaile A. Nichols (Turčan)	2016	2017	Hawaii (2008)	Clifton (9th Cir.) / Ezra (D. Haw.)
Tiffany R. Wright	2016	2017	Georgetown (2013)	Lamberth (D.D.C.) / Tatel (D.C. Cir.)
Carmen Gloria Iguina	2017	2018	NYU (2010)	Matsumoto (E.D.N.Y.) / Reinhardt (9th Cir.)
Julie Michelle Veroff	2017	2018	Yale (2015)	Berzon (9th Cir.) / Boasberg (D.D.C.)
Raymond P. Tolentino	2017	2018	Georgetown (2012)	McKeown (9th Cir.) / Matsumoto (E.D.N.Y.) / Pillard (D.C. Cir.)
Elizabeth Graber Bentley	2017	2018	Harvard (2013)	Rakoff (S.D.N.Y.) / Katzmann (2d Cir.)
Samiyyah Ali	2018	2019	Vanderbilt (2016)	Thapar (E.D. Ky.) / Srinivasan (D.C. Cir.)
Michael Skocpol	2018	2019	Stanford (2016)	Feinerman (N.D. Ill.) / Pillard (D.C. Cir.)
Rachel Wilf-Townsend	2018	2019	Yale (2017)	Garland (D.C. Cir.)
Michael L. Zuckerman	2018	2019	Harvard (2017)	K.N. Moore (6th Cir.)
Jodie C. Liu	2019	2020	Harvard (2015)	Livingston (2d Cir.) / Millett (D.C. Cir.)
Siobhan S. Atkins	2019	2020	NYU (2014)	Furman (S.D.N.Y.) / Lohier (2d Cir.)
Nicholas S. Crown	2019	2020	Yale (2016)	Ellis (E.D. Va.) / Higginson (5th Cir.)
Anuradha Sivaram	2019	2020	Berkeley (2014)	Thapar (E.D. Ky.) / Kozinski (9th Cir.)
Gregory Cui	2020	2021	Yale (2017)	W. Fletcher (9th Cir.) / Furman (S.D.N.Y.)
Kristen E. Loveland	2020	2021	NYU (2016)	Furman (S.D.N.Y.) / Lohier (2d Cir.)
ImeIme Umana	2020	2021	Harvard (2018)	Wilkins (D.C. Cir.)
Sarah Weiner	2020	2021	Yale (2017)	Tatel (D.C. Cir.) / Oetken (S.D.N.Y.)
Jack Boeglin (hired by Ginsburg)	2020	2021	Yale (2016)	Calabresi (2d Cir.) / Srinivasan (D.C. Cir.)
Thaddeus C. Eagles (hired by Stevens & Ginsburg)	2020	2021	NYU (2015)	Rakoff (S.D.N.Y.) / Katzmann (2d Cir.)
Whitney A. Brown	2021	2022	UCLA (2017)	Calabresi (2d Cir.) / Liu (Cal.) / Christen (9th Cir.)
Amit Jain	2021	2022	Yale (2018)	Motz (4th Cir.)
Katherine E. Munyan	2021	2022	Yale (2017)	Katzmann (2d Cir.) / Rakoff (S.D.N.Y.)
Steven D. Marcus	2021	2022	NYU (2016)	Edwards (D.C. Cir.) / Furman (S.D.N.Y.)
Kelley C. Schiffman	2022	2023	Yale (2018)	W. Fletcher (9th Cir.) / Ellison (S.D. Tex.)
Alejandra Ávila	2022	2023	Texas (2014)	Murguia (9th Cir.) / Alvarez (S.D. Tex.)
Spencer Smith	2022	2023	Harvard (2019)	Calabresi (2d Cir.)
Thomas Scott-Railton	2022	2023	Yale (2018)	Jackson (D.C. Cir.) / Nathan (S.D.N.Y.)
Paulina D. Arnold	2023	2024	Harvard (2018)	Pillard (D.C. Cir.) / Engelmayer (S.D.N.Y.)
Elise Baranouski	2023	2024	Harvard (2020)	Calabresi (2nd Cir.) / Engelmayer (S.D.N.Y.)
Cesar A. Lopez Morales	2023	2024	Boston University (2014)	Garcia-Gregory (D.P.R.) / Collyer (D.D.C.) / Cabranes (2nd Cir.)
Harmann Singh	2023	2024	Harvard (2019)	Lohier (2nd Cir.) / Carter (S.D.N.Y.)
Jordan Alston	2024	2025	Yale (2021)	Oetken (S.D.N.Y.) / Srinivasan (D.C. Cir.)
Guus Duindam-Kazanjian	2024	2025	Michigan (2021)	Levy (E.D. Mich.) / Kethledge (6th Cir.)
Jade Ford	2024	2025	Yale (2020)	Furman (S.D.N.Y.) / Pillard (D.C. Cir.)
Norah Rast	2024	2025	Harvard (2021)	AliKhan (D.C.) / Moss (D.D.C.) / Pillard (D.C. Cir.)
Jordan Goldberg	2025	2026	Yale (2019)	Engelmayer (S.D.N.Y.) / Harris (4th Cir.)
Kate Harris	2025	2026	Chicago (2021)	Hamilton (7th Cir.)
Jenny Jiao	2025	2026	Stanford (2023)	Garcia (D.C. Cir.) / Chhabria (N.D. Cal.)
Jerry Yan	2025	2026	Stanford (2022)	Millett (D.C. Cir.) / Cooper (D.D.C.)
Rebecca Arno	2026		Columbia (2020)	Parker (2d Cir.) / Liman (S.D.N.Y.)
Russell Bogue	2026		Yale (2023)	Boasberg (D.D.C.) / Pillard (D.C. Cir.)
Amelia Keyes	2026		Harvard (2023)	Friedland (9th Cir.) / Chhabria (N.D. Cal.)
Arijeet Sensharma	2026		NYU (2022)	Lohier (2d Cir.) / Furman (S.D.N.Y.)

== Additional sources ==
- Baier, Paul R. (1973). "The Law Clerks: Profile of an Institution," Vanderbilt L. Rev. 26: 1125–77.
- Brudney, Victor and Richard F. Wolfson, "Mr. Justice Rutledge—Law Clerks' Reflections," 35 Iowa L. Rev. (1950).
- "Finding Aid to the William Brennan Papers," Library of Congress (2001, rev'd April 2010), list of clerks.
- "Georgia Law Alumni Who Have Clerked for a U.S. Supreme Court Justice," Advocate, Spring/Summer 2004 (listing 6 names).
- Judicial Clerkship Handbook, USC Gould Law School, 2013-2014, p. 33, Appendix B.
- Newland, Charles A. (June 1961). "Personal Assistants to the Supreme Court Justices: The Law Clerks," Oregon L. Rev. 40: 306–07.
- News of Supreme Court clerks. University of Virginia Law School, list of clerks, 2004-2018.
- University of Michigan clerks to the Supreme Court, 1991-2017, University of Michigan Law School Web site (2016). Retrieved September 20, 2016.
- Ward, Artemus and David L. Weiden (2006). Sorcerers' Apprentices: 100 Years of Law Clerks at the United States Supreme Court. New York, NY: New York University Press. ISBN 978-0-8147-9420-3, ISBN 978-0-8147-9420-3.
