= David Lerner Associates =

American investment firm

David Lerner Associates, Inc.
- Type: Corporation
- Industry: Financial services
- Founded: 1976
- Founder: David Lerner
- Headquarters: Syosset, NY; United States
- Products: Investments
- Owner: David Lerner
- Number of employees: 185
- Website: www.davidlerner.com

David Lerner Associates is a privately held securities broker/dealer firm. The headquarters is in Syosset, New York, and with branch offices in Westport, CT; Boca Raton, Florida; Lawrenceville, NJ; and White Plains, NY. David Lerner Associates employs approximately 185 people, and holds clients' assets of approximately $4 billion. Their product offerings include retirement planning, annuities, college & education savings, life insurance, and other services.

== History ==
David Lerner Associates was founded by David Lerner in 1976. The first office was established in Jericho, New York.

== Community involvement and awards ==
Lerner has been a donor to causes in the community, including the Trey Whitfield School in Brooklyn. David Lerner Associates is also a sponsor of the Greater Long Island Running Club’s Annual Police Appreciation Run.

In 2011, a survey conducted by the Best Companies Group, named David Lerner Associates 6th place in the "large employer category" of the Best Companies to Work for in New York State.

== Apple REIT ==
Apple Hospitality REIT, Inc. (NYSE: APLE) is a publicly traded real estate investment trust that owns one of the largest portfolios of upscale, select service hotels in the United States. The company's portfolio consists of 216 hotels across 37 states.

Apple REIT started out as a non-traded real estate investment trust, and David Lerner Associates was the exclusive broker for this product.

In May 2013, Apple REIT Six Inc. completed a merger with an affiliate of the Blackstone Group LP. Apple REIT Six was sold exclusively by the Lerner firm to investors from 2004 to 2006, with most shares at $11. Each holder of an Apple REIT Six unit received $11.10 in value, consisting of $9.20 in cash and $1.90 per share in preferred stock of the Blackstone affiliate, BRE Select Hotels Corp. Investors could redeem the new shares after seven and a half years; the shares have a dividend rate of 7%. The total transaction value of the deal was $1.2 billion. The portfolio of Apple REIT Six consists of 66 hotels in 18 states and cashed out successfully for its investors. [11]

Apple Hospitality was formed in March 2014 with the merger of Apple REIT Seven Inc., Apple REIT Eight Inc. and Apple REIT Nine Inc. and subsequently filed for IPO in April 2015. They started trading on the NYSE (APLE) in May 2015. [12] [13]

Apple Hospitality REIT announced in April 2016 that they were purchasing Apple Ten. The merger was approved in September 2016. This makes Apple Hospitality one of the largest select service lodging REITs in the industry, with an enterprise value of approximately $4.9 billion and a total equity market capitalization of approximately $2.8 billion.[14]

== FINRA complaints and investigations ==
In May 2011, the Financial Industry Regulatory Authority (FINRA) filed a class action lawsuit against David Lerner Associates, charging the firm with misleading investors by marketing unsuitable products to them and conducting insufficient due diligence on the company that managed its real estate funds.

In October 2012, David Lerner Associates agreed to settle with FINRA for $14 million without admitting or denying the charges. Lerner was fined $250,000 and suspended from the securities industry for one year, and head trader William Mason fined $200,000 and suspended for six months.

In April 2013, U.S. District Judge Kiyo A. Matsumoto dismissed the class action lawsuit, ruling that investors had received sufficient disclosure to understand the risks of investing in its trusts. In her opinion, Judge Matsumoto wrote, “Plaintiffs’ belabored Complaint appears only to confirm that the Apple REITs are currently functioning in exactly the manner that was anticipated and disclosed in the REITs’ prospectuses and other offering documents.”

FINRA operatives opened investigations into Daniel Lerner, an executive vice president of the firm and child of its founder, in 2022; and CEO Martin Walcoe in 2024.
