= Daniel Halberstam =

American academic (c. 1966)

Daniel H. Halberstam
- Born: 1966 or 1967 (age 58–59); West Germany
- Education: Columbia University; Yale Law School
- Spouse: Ellen D. Katz (m. 1996)
- Scientific career
- Fields: Constitutional law Comparative federalism European Union
- Workplaces: University of Michigan Law School

Daniel H. Halberstam (born 1966 or 1967) is a German-American legal scholar focusing on comparative constitutional law, transnational law and European law. Halberstam is the Eric Stein Collegiate Professor of Law and Director of the European Legal Studies Program at the University of Michigan Law School. He is also professor at College of Europe.

Halberstam earned his B.A. summa cum laude and Phi Beta Kappa, in mathematics from Columbia University and his J.D. from Yale Law School where he served as an articles editor of the Yale Law Journal. He then served as a law clerk to Judge Patricia Wald of the U.S. Court of Appeals for the D.C. Circuit and for Justice David Souter of the U.S. Supreme Court.

Halberstam is married to Ellen D. Katz, also a professor at the University of Michigan Law School.

== See also ==
- List of law clerks for the third seat of the Supreme Court of the United States
