= Ryan Y. Park =

American lawyer

Ryan Park
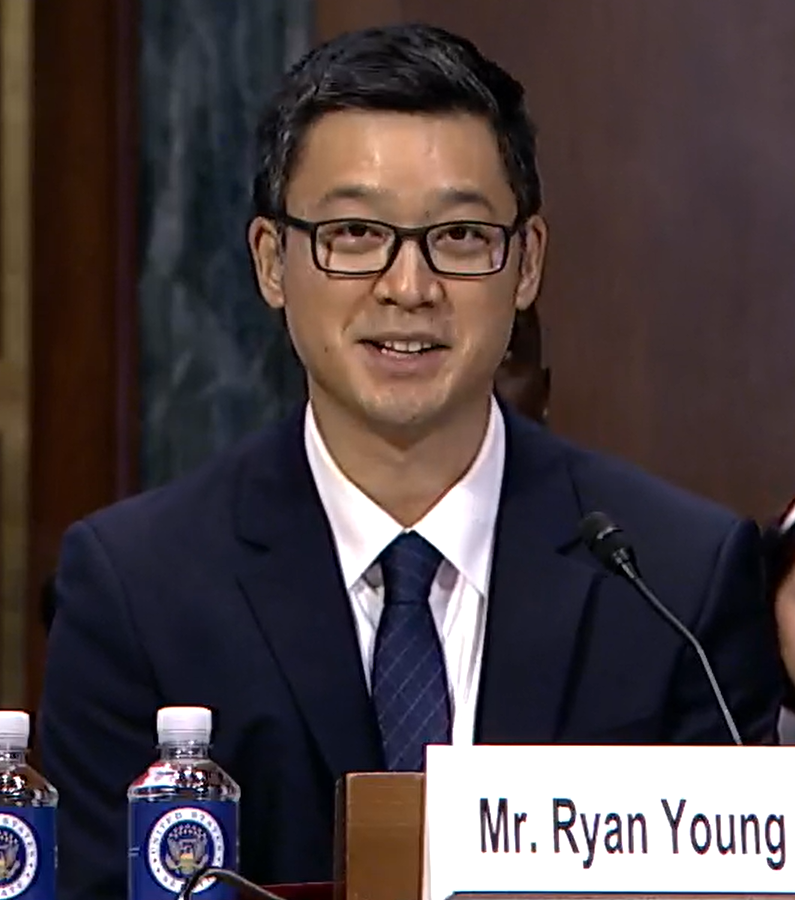
- Park in 2024

Solicitor General of North Carolina
- In office March 31, 2022 – April 30, 2025
- Appointed by: Josh Stein
- Preceded by: Matt Sawchak
- Succeeded by: Nick Brod

Personal details
- Born: Ryan Young Park; 1983 (age 42–43) Fridley, Minnesota, U.S.
- Party: Democratic
- Education: Amherst College (BA); Harvard University (JD)

Ryan Young Park (born 1983) is an American lawyer who served as the solicitor general of North Carolina from 2020 to 2025. In 2024, he was nominated by President Joe Biden to serve as a United States circuit judge of the United States Court of Appeals for the Fourth Circuit. His nomination was favorably reported out of the Senate Judiciary Committee but did not see a vote in the full Senate.

Park represented the University of North Carolina at Chapel Hill in the Supreme Court case Students for Fair Admissions, Inc. v. University of North Carolina, a companion case to Students for Fair Admissions v. President and Fellows of Harvard College.

== Early life and education ==
The son of Korean immigrants, Park was born in Fridley, Minnesota, in 1983 and grew up in Shoreview, Minnesota. His mother moved from Korea to North Carolina to pursue a degree in library science at East Carolina University.

Park enrolled at Amherst College, receiving his Bachelor of Arts in economics and political science with distinction in 2005 as president of the college's student government. From 2006 to 2007, he was a Fulbright Scholar teaching English at a boys' school in South Korea. He graduated from Harvard Law School in 2010 with a Juris Doctor, summa cum laude.

== Career ==
After graduating from law school, he served as a law clerk for Judges Jed S. Rakoff of the United States District Court for the Southern District of New York from 2010 to 2011 and Robert Katzmann of the United States Court of Appeals for the Second Circuit from 2011 to 2012. From 2013 to 2014, he clerked for Justices David Souter and Ruth Bader Ginsburg of the Supreme Court of the United States.

Park served as a legal counsel for the Legal Adviser of the Department of State from 2012 to 2013. From 2014 to 2017, he was an associate at Boies Schiller Flexner LLP. He served as a deputy solicitor general of North Carolina from 2017 to 2020. On March 31, 2020, he became the solicitor general. After five years as solicitor general, he joined McGuireWoods as a partner in their appellate practice.

Park is a senior lecturing fellow at Duke University and has previously taught at the University of North Carolina School of Law.

=== Nomination to the Fourth Circuit ===
On July 3, 2024, President Joe Biden announced his intent to nominate Park to serve as a United States circuit judge of the United States Court of Appeals for the Fourth Circuit. On July 8, 2024, Park's nomination was sent to the Senate. President Biden nominated Park to the seat being vacated by Judge James Andrew Wynn, who announced his intent to assume senior status upon confirmation of a successor. Park was rated unanimously well-qualified by the American Bar Association's Standing Committee on the Federal Judiciary -- its highest rating. If confirmed, Park would have been the first Asian-American to serve on the Fourth Circuit.

North Carolina Senators Thom Tillis and Ted Budd issued a joint statement objecting to the nomination. Tillis said he had informed the White House in April that he had obtained enough support to block Park's nomination, but that the White House had declined to put forth an alternative nominee. Despite this opposition, Park's nomination received widespread bipartisan support from a number of organizations and individuals. A group of current and former state Solicitors General submitted a letter endorsing his nomination, noting his "legal acumen, temperament, and experience" and his leadership of bipartisan multistate coalitions. Signatories of the letter included notable conservatives, including Mississippi Solicitor General Scott Stewart, FERC Commissioner and former West Virginia Solicitor General Lindsey See, and Sixth Circuit Judge and former Ohio Solicitor General Benjamin Flowers. A group of former U.S. Supreme Court law clerks from the October 2013 Term describing themselves as holding "a range of views on politics, judicial philosophy, and constitutional interpretation" also wrote in support of Park's nomination, emphasizing that "in addition to his legal talents, he is an exceptional trustworthy, humble, and kind human being" who displays "an open-minded manner about even the most controversial legal questions." Park received notable support from law enforcement groups, including endorsements from the Southern States Police Benevolent Association, the National Fraternal Order of Police, a bipartisan group of North Carolina District Attorneys, the President of the North Carolina Sheriffs Association, the President of the North Carolina Association of Chiefs of Police, and the North Carolina Police Executives Association. Civil rights groups like The Leadership Conference on Civil and Human Rights also endorsed his nomination.

On July 31, 2024, a hearing on Park's nomination was held before the Senate Judiciary Committee. During his confirmation hearing, Park faced criticism over his work for then-North Carolina attorney general Josh Stein. Republican members of the committee "took aim at Park's record as North Carolina solicitor general, trying to position him as a political activist rather than an impartial arbiter of the law." U.S. Senator John Kennedy questioned whether Park had failed to zealously defend a North Carolina voter identification law in his role with the attorney general's office, or if he had intentionally thrown the case for political purposes. Park responded that these criticisms were not "a fair description of [his] record" and noted that he had frequently defended statutes passed by North Carolina's Republican legislature. On November 14, 2024, his nomination was reported out of committee by an 11–10 party line vote. On November 21, 2024, Senator Chuck Schumer announced that he had made a deal with Senate Republicans to withhold floor votes on Park and three other Biden appellate nominees in exchange for permitting several district court judges' nominations to proceed to floor votes. On December 12, 2024, the White House officially withdrew his nomination.

Park's confirmation process has been cited as a "cautionary tale" of the contemporary judicial confirmation wars that "deprived North Carolinians ... of a particularly competent, smart, ethical, and independent circuit judge who promised to be a valuable servant of the public."

== Personal life ==
Park is married to Eunee Kathleen, whom he met while they were both undergraduates at Amherst College. They have two daughters.

== See also ==
- List of law clerks for the third seat of the Supreme Court of the United States
- List of law clerks for the sixth seat of the Supreme Court of the United States
