= Matthew Schwartz =

American judge (born 1978)

Judge of the United States Court of Appeals for the Second Circuit
- Incumbent
- Assumed office July 24, 2026
- Appointed by: Donald Trump
- Preceded by: Debra Ann Livingston

Personal details
- Born: Matthew Alexander Schwartz; October 1978 (age 48) New York City, New York, U.S.
- Education: Princeton University (BA); Columbia University (JD)

Matthew Alexander Schwartz (born October 1978) is a United States circuit judge for the United States Court of Appeals for the Second Circuit, sworn in on July 24, 2026. He was a partner at Sullivan & Cromwell.

== Early life and education ==
Schwartz was born in October 1978 in New York City. He received a Bachelor of Arts degree in 2000 from Princeton University and a Juris Doctor in 2003 from Columbia Law School. He clerked twice for Justice Samuel Alito, firstly when Alito was a judge of the U.S. Court of Appeals for the Third Circuit from 2003 to 2004, then secondly when Alito was on the U.S. Supreme Court from 2006 to 2007.

== Career ==
Schwartz joined the white shoe law firm of Sullivan & Cromwell in New York City in 2007 as an associate and was elected partner in 2011. He focused mainly on securities law, mergers and acquisitions, derivative suits, antitrust law, bank regulation, contracts, constitutional law, administrative law, and general commercial litigation. He served as personal counsel to President Donald Trump in several cases, including Trump's appeal in the Stormy Daniels hush money case.

=== Federal judicial service ===
On April 10, 2026, Trump announced his intention to nominate Schwartz to an unspecified seat on the United States Court of Appeals for the Second Circuit. On April 27, 2026, Trump nominated Schwartz to the seat being vacated by Debra Ann Livingston. On May 20, 2026, Schwartz had a confirmation hearing before the United States Senate Committee on the Judiciary. On June 18, 2026, the committee advanced his nomination by a 12–10 party line vote. On June 24, 2026, the entire Senate invoked cloture on his nomination by a 52–45 vote. On July 14, 2026, the Senate confirmed him by a 50–45 vote. He received his judicial commission on July 24, 2026.

== Personal life ==
Schwartz is married to Amy Cayne and they have four children. They reside in Westchester County, New York.

Legal offices
| Preceded by Debra Ann Livingston | Judge of the United States Court of Appeals for the Second Circuit; 2026–present | Incumbent |
