= William Araiza =

American lawyer

William David Araiza (born 1961) is an American lawyer and law professor. He is the Stanley A. August Professor of Law at Brooklyn Law School, and the author of Rebuilding Expertise: Creating Effective and Trustworthy Regulation in an Age of Doubt, among other works.

== Education ==
Araiza received his B.A., summa cum laude, 1983, and graduated Phi Beta Kappa from Columbia University, and studied a year abroad at the London School of Economics in 1981-1982. He earned a M.S. in international relations, graduating with Highest Honors, 1985, from Georgetown University, worked in banking for a few years, and then attended Yale Law School, where he received his J.D., 1990, and was a notes editor for the Yale Law Journal.

== Career ==
Araiza clerked for Judge William A. Norris of the U.S. Court of Appeals for the Ninth Circuit, and served as a law clerk to associate justice David Souter.

He worked as an environmental and insurance litigation associate at Heller, Ehrman, White & McAuliffe and as an environmental and general litigation associate at McCutchen, Doyle, Brown and Enersen in Los Angeles. Araiza is a member of the American Bar Association, National LGBT Bar Association, and Hispanic National Bar Association.

In 1995, Araiza joined the faculty of Loyola Law School Los Angeles as an associate professor of constitutional and administrative law and became a full professor in 1999. He was named an associate dean of faculty in 2005, and during his Loyola tenure the Rev. Richard A. Vachon, S.J. Fellow.

In 2009, Araiza moved to Brooklyn Law School, where he teaches administrative and constitutional law classes and serves as the Stanley August Professor of Law. In 2025, Araiza was named Vice Dean of Brooklyn Law School.

In addition to Loyola Law and Brooklyn Law, Araiza has taught at the Benjamin N. Cardozo School of Law, the Fordham University School of Law, Lewis & Clark Law School, New York University School of Law (where he was an adjunct professor in 2024), UCLA School of Law, the University of California College of the Law, San Francisco, the University of Western Ontario Faculty of Law, and Washington and Lee University School of Law (where he was a visiting professor in spring 2005). He chaired the administrative law section of the Association of American Law Schools in 2013.

== Publications ==
Araiza is the author of several articles, casebooks, treatises, and books on First Amendment Law, Constitutional Law, including topics related to gay rights and same-sex marriage. His books include:

- Araiza, William D. Rebuilding Expertise: Creating Effective and Trustworthy Regulation in an Age of Doubt (NYU Press, 2022)
- Araiza, William D. Constitutional Law: Cases, Approaches, and Applications (Carolina Academic Press Second Ed. 2020)
- Araiza, William D. and A.D. Hellman, T.E. Baker, and Bhagwat. First Amendment Law: Freedom of Expression and Freedom of Religion (Carolina Academic Press Fourth Ed. 2018)
- Araiza, William D. Animus: A Short Introduction to Bias in the Law (New York University Press 2017)
- Araiza, William D. Constitutional Law: Cases, Approaches, and Applications (Carolina Academic Press 2016)
- Araiza, William D. Enforcing the Equal Protection Clause: Congressional Power, Judicial Doctrine, and Constitutional Law (New York University Press 2016)
- Araiza, William D. and A.D. Hellman and T.E. Baker. First Amendment Law: Freedom of Expression and Freedom of Religion (3d edition, 2014)
