= Peter L. Strauss =

Retired Administrative Law Professor at Columbia University

- Born: February 6, 1940 (age 86)

Academic background
- Education: Harvard University (BA); Yale University (LLB)

Academic work
- Discipline: Constitutional law

Peter L. Strauss (born February 26, 1940) is an American lawyer, author and academic who is the Betts Professor of Law Emeritus at Columbia Law School.

Strauss taught courses in administrative law, constitutional law, family law, legal education, legal methods, and legislation and the regulatory state. He is the author of several legal textbooks and has served as an attorney with the U.S. government.

== Background ==
Strauss was born on February 6, 1940. He graduated from Harvard College in 1961 with a Bachelor of Arts and from Yale Law School in 1964 with a Bachelor of Laws. He was a law clerk to chief judge David L. Bazelon of the U.S. Court of Appeals for the District of Columbia Circuit from 1964 to 1965 and to Justice William J. Brennan Jr. of the U.S. Supreme Court from 1965 to 1966. He then spent two years lecturing on criminal law at the national university of Ethiopia. Returning to the United States, he spent the next three years as an attorney in the Office of the Solicitor General, briefing and arguing cases before the United States Supreme Court. Strauss joined the faculty at Columbia Law School in 1971, and taught there until the fall of 2021. During 1975 to 1977, he became the first General Counsel of the United States Nuclear Regulatory Commission.

== Publications ==
Strauss's published works include Administrative Justice in the United States (1989, 2002 and 2016); Gellhorn's & Byse's Administrative Law: Cases and Comments (6 editions, the most recent in 2018, with Rakoff, Metzger, O'Connor and Barron); Legal Methods: Understanding and Using Cases and Statutes (2005, 2008, and 2014); Legislation, Understanding and Using Statutes (2006), Administrative Law Stories (2006) and numerous law review articles, generally focusing on issues of rule making, separation of powers (with particular attention to presidential authority), and statutory interpretation. Many can be found on his SSRN author page, He was the editor of A. Paulos Tzadua's English translation of the Ge'ez language 13th century Ethiopian law code, The Fetha Nagast (The Law of Kings).

== Recognitions ==
In 1987 the Section of Administrative Law and Regulatory Practice of the American Bar Association presented Strauss its third annual award for distinguished scholarship in administrative law for his essay “The Place of Agencies in Government: Separation of Powers and the Fourth Branch." In 1992 to 1993, he served as Chair of the Section. He has been reporter for rulemaking on its APA and European Union Administrative Law projects, and was a member of its E-Rulemaking task force. In 2008, the American Constitution Society awarded Strauss the first Richard Cudahy prize for his essay "Overseer or 'The Decider'? The President in Administrative Law." He is a member of the American Law Institute and the American Academy of Arts and Sciences, and a Senior Fellow of the Administrative Conference of the United States.

Strauss has visited at the European University Institute, Harvard and NYU, and lectured widely on American administrative law abroad, including programs in Argentina, Belarus, Brazil, China, France, Germany, Italy, Japan, the Netherlands, Mexico, Turkey, the UK, and Venezuela. During 2008 to 2009 he was Fernand Braudel Senior Fellow at the European Law Institute and Parsons fellow at the University of Sydney Law School.

== See also ==
- List of law clerks for the third seat of the Supreme Court of the United States
