= Ellen D. Katz =

- Born: 1968 or 1969 (age 56–57)
- Education: Yale University (BA, JD)
- Occupation: Law professor
- Spouse: Daniel Halberstam (m. 1996)
- Parent(s): Arlene and Seymour Katz

Ellen D. Katz (born 1968 or 1969) is an American legal scholar at the University of Michigan Law School. Katz has written "a significant body of scholarship on voting rights and election law" and has also written and taught on equal protection, civil rights, and legal history. A scholar of the Voting Rights Act, she wrote a widely cited empirical study of litigation under that act.

== Education and career ==
Katz received her B.A in history summa cum laude from Yale College in 1991, and her J.D. in 1994 from Yale Law School, where she was articles editor of the Yale Law Journal. Katz served as a law clerk to Judge Judith W. Rogers of the U.S. Court of Appeals for the D.C. Circuit and then for Justice David Souter of the U.S. Supreme Court.

Katz was an attorney with the appellate sections of the U.S. Department of Justice Civil Division and Environment and Natural Resources Division before joining the Michigan Law faculty in 1999.

Katz's work focuses on minority representation, political equality, and anti-discrimination law. Katz's work has been published in various law journals, including the Michigan Law Review and the University of Pennsylvania Law Review.

At Michigan, Katz has taught property, voting rights and election law, law and political participation, education law, and local government law, among other courses.

Katz has been described as "a liberal law professor and a big fan of the Voting Rights Act of 1965," describing the act as "sacred." However, she has also said that Congress should rework the current VRA, and consider "whether the old remedies continue to be the right remedies at this moment going forward." Richard L. Hasen described this as "remarkable" because of Katz's past defenses of the constitutionality of the VRA's section 5.

Katz was a critic of the Supreme Court decision in Northwest Austin Municipal Utility District No. 1 v. Holder in 2009, stating that its narrow statutory, rather than constitutional, ruling was "an improbable one" that "allows just everybody involved in the case to declare victory."

Katz is a critic of the Supreme Court's "congruence and proportionality" test for the congressional power of enforcement of the Fourteenth and Fifteenth amendments, arguing in her 2003 article Reinforcing Representation that the framers of these Reconstruction amendments intended Congress to have broader power.

In Katz's 2009 article Withdrawal: The Roberts Court and the Retreat from Election Law, Katz examined four important election law decisions of the Roberts Court (Lopez Torres, Washington State Grange, Crawford, and Riley) and criticized the Court's "retreat from its longstanding role as the primary guardian of voting rights" as "coming close to embracing empty formalism."

== Personal life ==
Katz is married to Daniel Halberstam, who is also a professor at the University of Michigan Law School.

== See also ==
- List of law clerks for the third seat of the Supreme Court of the United States
