= Laura Liu =

American lawyer and judge (1966–2016)

Laura Cha-Yu Liu

Judge for the Illinois Appellate Court for the 1st District
- In office February 3, 2014 – April 15, 2016
- Preceded by: Patrick Quinn
- Succeeded by: Mary L. Mikva

Judge for the Circuit Court of Cook County
- In office 2010–2014

Personal details
- Born: July 19, 1966 Carbondale, Illinois, U.S.
- Died: April 15, 2016 (aged 49) Chicago, Illinois, U.S.
- Spouse: Michael J. Kasper (m. 1996–2016)
- Children: 1
- Education: Youngstown State University (BA); University of Cincinnati (JD)

Laura Cha-Yu Liu (July 19, 1966 – April 15, 2016) was an American circuit court and state appellate court judge. She was the first Chinese American woman judge appointed to the Circuit Court of Cook County and the first Chinese American appointed to the Illinois Appellate Court.

== Background ==
Born in Carbondale, Illinois, to a Vietnamese mother and a Chinese father, both of whom were exchange students, Liu grew up in Austintown, Ohio. She began school speaking very little English and went on to become valedictorian of Austintown Fitch High School. In 1987, Liu received her bachelor's degree from Youngstown State University and her J.D. from the University of Cincinnati College of Law in 1991.

== Career ==
From 1991 to 2010, Liu practiced law in Chicago, primarily at the law firm Hogan Marren, Ltd.

In 2010, she was appointed Illinois Circuit Court judge for Cook County, Illinois. When Liu won election to the 8th Judicial Subcircuit of Cook County in 2012, she became the first Chinese American elected to public office in the county. That same year, she co-chaired the Illinois Supreme Court's Access to Justice Commission, which worked to bridge language barriers for non-English-speaking litigants. Liu's efforts resulted in the establishment of rules requiring courts to provide qualified interpreters for parties and witnesses, and the installation of signage in different languages outside courthouses. Additionally, her work in the circuit court's Chancery Division made her acutely aware of the challenges faced by self-represented litigants, particularly in mortgage-foreclosure cases: "She recalled the advice she received from another Cook County judge who, like her at the time, overheard mortgage-foreclosure cases: 'This may be the 100th case you’ve heard at the end of the day, but it is this borrower’s first and only case. It's their most important case, and their only case in front of you.'"

In 2014, Liu was appointed to the Illinois Appellate Court, a position she held until her untimely death. In 2016, Liu was awarded, posthumously, the Daniel K. Inouye Trailblazer Award by the National Asian Pacific American Bar Association. The Illinois Supreme Court appointed Mary L. Mikva to succeed her.

As the first Asian-American appellate court justice in Illinois, first Chinese-American female judge in Illinois, and first Chinese-American to be elected to public office in Illinois, a life-size bronze sculpture designed by Erik Blome was dedicated to her on April 15, 2017, in Chicago's Ping Tom Memorial Park.

== Personal life ==
Liu married Michael J. Kasper in 2006; together they had a daughter in 2009. Liu was diagnosed with breast cancer in 2011, but she continued her work until she died in 2016 at the age of 49.

== See also ==
- List of first women lawyers and judges in Illinois
