= Ramon Reyes =

American federal judge (born 1966)

Ramón E. Reyes Jr.
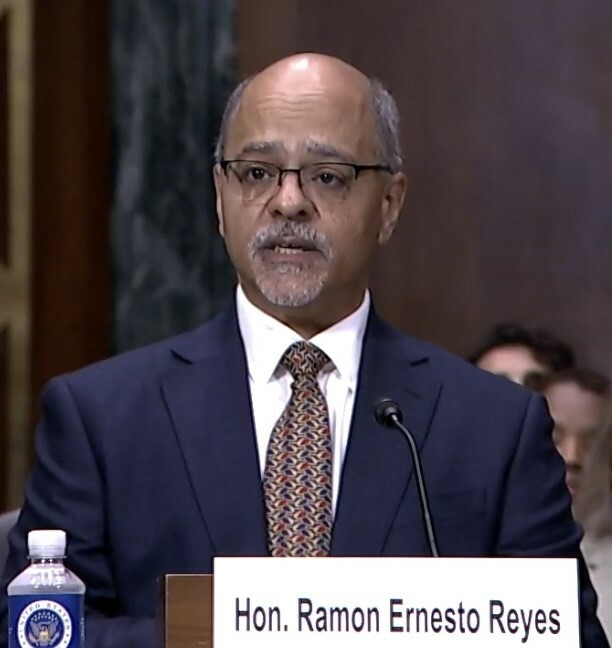

Judge of the United States District Court for the Eastern District of New York
- Incumbent
- Assumed office November 13, 2023
- Appointed by: Joe Biden
- Preceded by: Kiyo A. Matsumoto

Magistrate Judge of the United States District Court for the Eastern District of New York
- In office February 13, 2006 – November 13, 2023

Personal details
- Born: Ramón Ernesto Reyes Jr. 1966 (age 59–60) Brooklyn, New York, U.S.
- Education: Cornell University (BS); Brooklyn Law School (JD); New York University (LLM)

Ramón Ernesto Reyes Jr. (born 1966) is an American lawyer who has served as a United States district judge of the United States District Court for the Eastern District of New York since 2023. He previously served as a United States magistrate judge of the same court from 2006 to 2023.

== Education ==
Reyes received a Bachelor of Science from Cornell University in 1988, a Juris Doctor from Brooklyn Law School in 1992 and a Master of Laws from New York University School of Law in 1993.

== Career ==
In 1991, Reyes was a summer associate at Morrison & Foerster in their Manhattan office. In 1993, he was a legislative attorney for the New York City Council. From 1994 to 1995, he served as a law clerk for Judge David G. Trager of the United States District Court for the Eastern District of New York. From 1995 to 1998, he was a litigation associate at O'Melveny & Myers in New York City. From 1998 to 2006, Reyes served as an assistant United States attorney for the United States Attorney's Office for the Southern District of New York. From 2008 to 2017, he was an adjunct professor of clinical law at Brooklyn Law School.

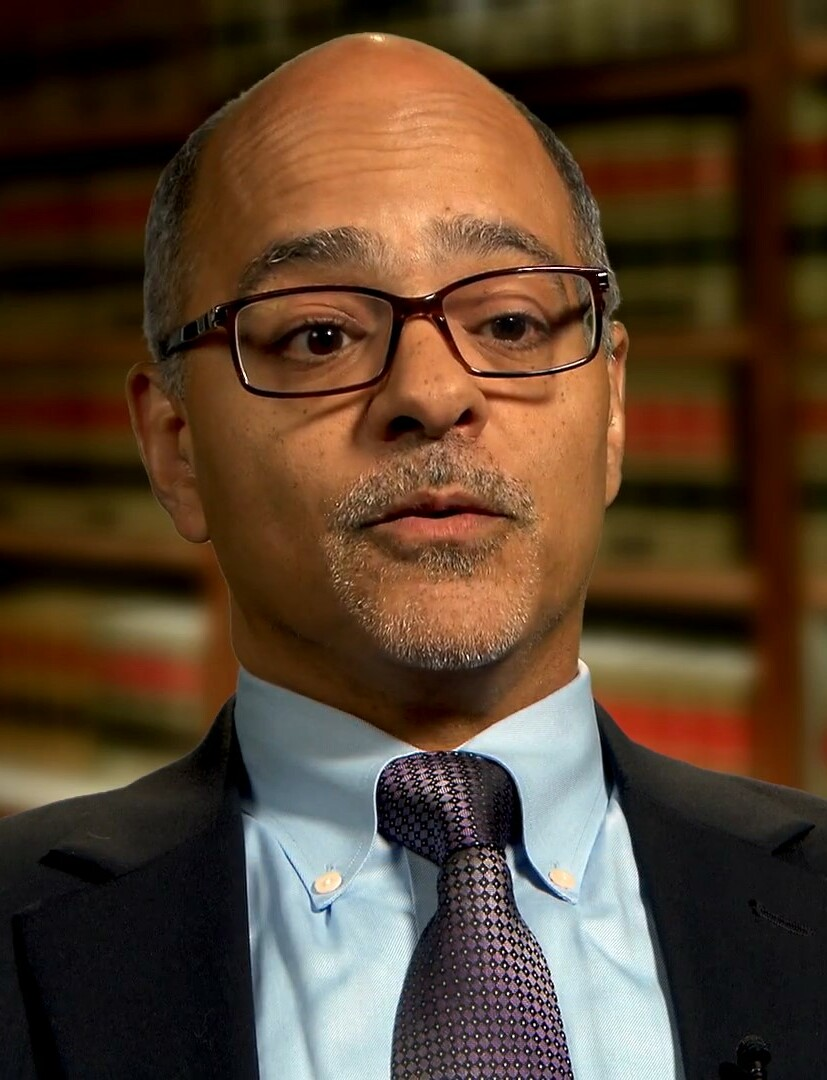
Reyes in 2018

=== Federal judicial service ===
From February 13, 2006 to November 13, 2023, he served as a magistrate judge for the Eastern District of New York.

Reyes was recommended to President Joe Biden by Senator Chuck Schumer. On September 2, 2022, President Biden announced his intent to nominate Reyes to serve as a United States district judge of the United States District Court for the Eastern District of New York. On September 6, 2022, his nomination was sent to the Senate. President Biden nominated Reyes to the seat vacated by Judge Kiyo A. Matsumoto, who assumed senior status on July 23, 2022. Reyes was unanimously rated "well qualified" for the judgeship by the American Bar Association's Standing Committee on the Federal Judiciary. On November 30, 2022, a hearing on his nomination was held before the Senate Judiciary Committee. During his confirmation hearing, Senator Marsha Blackburn, accused him of "releasing dangerous criminals into the community" via bail grants. She asked how the panel could be assured Reyes would follow sentencing laws considering complaints about crime from her constituents. On January 3, 2023, his nomination was returned to the President under Rule XXXI, Paragraph 6 of the United States Senate. He was renominated on January 23, 2023. On February 9, 2023, his nomination was reported out of committee by an 11–10 vote. On November 7, 2023, the Senate invoked cloture on his nomination by a 50–46 vote. On November 8, 2023, his nomination was confirmed by a 51–48 vote. He received his judicial commission on November 13, 2023.

== Memberships and organizations ==
Reyes is a member of the board of trustees of Brooklyn Law School and the board of directors of the Federal Bar Association, Eastern District Chapter. He previously served as president of the Federal Magistrate Judges Association in 2019, as a member of the board of trustees of the Federal Bar Council from 2006 to 2012, and a member of the American Bar Association's Coalition on Racial and Ethnic Justice from 2013 to 2016.

== See also ==
- List of Hispanic and Latino American jurists

Legal offices
Preceded by Kiyo A. Matsumoto	Judge of the United States District Court for the Eastern District of New York; 2023–present	Incumbent
