= NYU Annual Survey of American Law =

- Discipline: American law, General law
- Language: English

Publication details
- Former name: Annual Survey of American Law
- History: 1942–present

Standard abbreviations
- Bluebook: N.Y.U. Ann. Surv. Am. L.
- ISO 4: NYU Annu. Surv. Am. Law

Indexing
- ISSN: 0066-4413
- OCLC no.: 463887551

Links
- Journal homepage

The New York University Annual Survey of American Law (Annual Survey) is a student-run law journal at New York University School of Law.

== Mission ==
The Annual Survey of American Law was founded in 1942, making it the second-oldest law journal at NYU. The journal formally added New York University to the title in 1999. Originally, it was compiled by members of the NYU faculty as a comprehensive annual reference to developments in American law. The Annual Survey is now a quarterly publication that, in addition to publishing generalist legal scholarship, continues to dedicate itself to exploring legal developments from a practice-oriented perspective.

== Scholarship ==
The Annual Survey publishes four issues each year. Two are general issues containing legal scholarship on current issues in American law. The Annual Survey each year sponsors a symposium, bringing scholars, advocates, and members of the judiciary to NYU to discuss a topic of interest, and publishes a symposium issue of the journal with articles arising out of the symposium. A dedication is held each year to honor an important figure in the legal community at which scholars and peers honor that figure. This event leads to a dedication issue focused on the life and work of that author. The journal also fosters student scholarship through a note-writing program, and frequently publishes the work of NYU students.

== Selection ==
Each year the Annual Survey selects 50 new Staff Editors from the rising 2L class on the basis of writing competition entries, bluebooking, grades, resumes, and personal statements.

== Writing program and competition ==
Soon after selection to the Annual Survey, rising 2L Staff Editors are invited to participate in a special competition for the journal's Note Writing program. The writing program allows 2L Staff Editors to focus exclusively on the development of a student note for publication in the Annual Survey: program participants agree to a rigorous writing schedule but are afforded an exemption from most journal production assignments.

== Notable alumni ==
- Raymond Lohier, Judge of the United States Court of Appeals for the Second Circuit
- Mimi Rocah, former District Attorney for Westchester County
