= Eunice C. Lee =

American judge (born 1970)

Eunice Lee
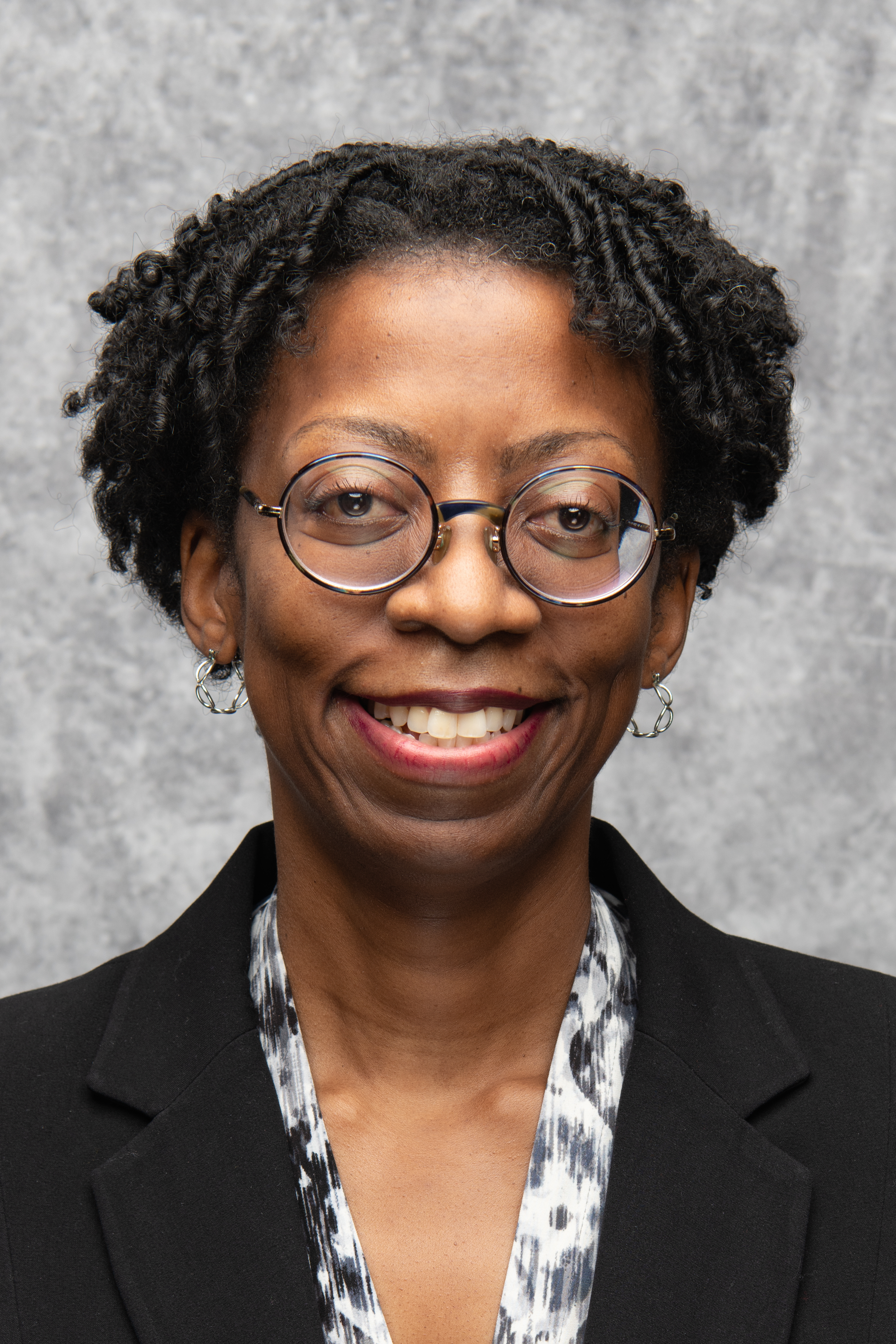

Judge of the United States Court of Appeals for the Second Circuit
- Incumbent
- Assumed office August 16, 2021
- Appointed by: Joe Biden
- Preceded by: Robert Katzmann

Personal details
- Born: 1970 (age 55–56) Wiesbaden, West Germany (now Germany)
- Education: Ohio State University (BA); Yale University (JD)

Eunice Cheryl Lee (born 1970) is an American lawyer who serves as a United States circuit judge of the United States Court of Appeals for the Second Circuit. Born in West Germany, she attended Ohio State University and Yale Law School. In 2021, she was confirmed by the United States Senate to serve on the Second Circuit after being nominated by President Joe Biden.

== Early life and education ==
Lee was born on a United States Air Force base in Wiesbaden, Germany. She graduated from Ohio State University in 1993 with a Bachelor of Arts degree, summa cum laude. She then attended Yale Law School, graduating in 1996 with a Juris Doctor.

== Career ==
Lee began her legal career as a law clerk for Judge Susan J. Dlott on the United States District Court for the Southern District of Ohio from 1996 to 1997, and Judge Eric L. Clay on the United States Court of Appeals for the Sixth Circuit from 1997 to 1998.

From 1998 to 2019, Lee worked with the Office of the Appellate Defender in New York City; from 2003 to 2019 she also served as director of recruitment and outreach at the Office of the Appellate Defender. She joined the office as a staff attorney and was named supervising attorney in 2001. She served as an adjunct assistant professor of clinical law at New York University School of Law from 2003 to 2019, teaching a criminal appellate defense clinic. On January 26, 2022, it was speculated by some media outlets that Lee would be considered by Joe Biden as a nominee to replace Stephen Breyer on the United States Supreme Court. Biden ultimately chose United States Court of Appeals judge Ketanji Brown Jackson.

=== Federal judicial service ===
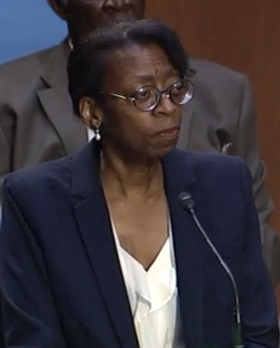
Lee during the U.S. Senate Judiciary Committee hearing

On May 12, 2021, President Joe Biden nominated Lee to serve as a United States circuit judge for the United States Court of Appeals for the Second Circuit to the seat vacated by Judge Robert Katzmann, who assumed senior status on January 21, 2021. On June 9, 2021, a hearing on her nomination was held before the Senate Judiciary Committee. During her confirmation hearing, she distanced herself from the contents of a letter she wrote as an Ohio State undergrad in 1991, which talks about Thomas being a "black conservative." On July 15, 2021, her nomination was reported out of committee by an 11–10 vote, with Senator Lindsey Graham passing on the vote. On August 3, 2021, Majority Leader Chuck Schumer filed cloture on her nomination. On August 5, 2021, the Senate invoked cloture on her nomination by a 50–49 vote. On August 7, 2021, her nomination was confirmed by a 50–47 vote. Upon confirmation, Lee became the longest-serving public defender to ever serve as a judge on a United States Court of Appeals. She is the second African American woman ever to serve on the Second Circuit and was the only judge with experience as a federal defender serving on that circuit court until the confirmation of Sarah A. L. Merriam. She received her commission on August 16, 2021.

=== Notable rulings ===
In 2021, New York City school administrators and teachers filed suit to halt the vaccine mandate that was implemented due to the COVID-19 pandemic. Lee was part of a panel that ruled the vaccine mandate did not violate the First Amendment. The case was remanded, as the panel's opinion stated the city's mandate was likely unconstitutional.

In 2022, Lee was part of a panel that ruled in Bruce Katz, M.D., P.C. v. Focus Forward. This was a consumer protection case involving unsolicited advertisement under the Telephone Consumer Protection Act.

== See also ==
- List of African American federal judges
- List of African American jurists
- Joe Biden judicial appointment controversies
- Joe Biden Supreme Court candidates

Legal offices
Preceded by Robert Katzmann	Judge of the United States Court of Appeals for the Second Circuit; 2021–present	Incumbent
