= Mary L. Mikva =

American judge

Judge of the Illinois Appellate Court from the 1st District
- Incumbent
- Assumed office July 2016
- Preceded by: Laura Liu

Judge of the Circuit Court of Cook County
- In office 2004 – July 2016

Personal details
- Born: Evanston, Illinois
- Spouse: Steven H. Cohen
- Children: 2
- Education: Beloit College (BA); Northwestern University (JD)
- Website: marylanemikva.com

Mary Lane Mikva is an American jurist who is a judge of the First District Appellate Court of Illinois in Chicago, serving from her appointment in July 2016.

== Biography ==
Mikva is the daughter of Judge Abner Mikva and Zorita ("Zoe") (nee Wise) Mikva. Mikva and her two sisters were raised in the neighborhood of Hyde Park on the South Side of Chicago, and attended public schools. She earned her Bachelor of Arts in theater at Beloit College in 1974, working after graduation as a paralegal at the law firm Jenner & Block. She then attended Northwestern University Pritzker School of Law, graduating cum laude and Order of the Coif in 1980. Following graduation, she served as law clerk to Judge Prentice Marshall of the United States District Court for the Northern District of Illinois, and then to Justice William J. Brennan Jr., of the United States Supreme Court. After her clerkships, Mikva practiced law in Chicago as a partner at Abrahamson Vorachek & Mikva and Seliger & Mikva, specializing in civil rights and employment law, and in criminal defense with Patrick A. Tuite & Associates.

In November 2004, Mikva was elected judge of the Circuit Court of Cook County, where she served until her appointment to the appellate court in 2016. On the trial bench, she served in the Chancery Division where she assisted in judicial education. In 2016, Mikva was appointed by the Illinois Supreme Court to the Illinois Appellate Court to fill the vacancy created by the death of Justice Laura Liu. Mikva's Illinois 1st District Appellate Court term ends in December 2024, unless she is reelected. Mikva was endorsed by the Cook County Democratic party for the 2024 Appellate Court primary election, and will be on the 2024 ballot.

=== Notable decisions ===
In December 2018, Mikva authored an opinion of the First District Court of Appeals upholding the trial court's refusal to require the Chicago Board of Education to produce records concerning complaints relating to security or police in possession of the Chicago Public Schools. The task would be too time consuming, the court reasoned.

In June 2014, Mikva ruled in the case of Clark v. ISBE (14 CH 7356) that proposals for Illinois legislators’ term limits and political redistricting were both unconstitutional.

In September 2011, in ACLU v Illinois State Police (10 CH 40840), a lawsuit over disclosure of documents under the Freedom of Information Act, Mikva decided the Illinois State Police must turn over a memorandum of understanding with the United States National Guard, but that other requested documents could properly remain confidential.

== Personal life ==
Mikva is married to Steven H. Cohen, an attorney, and they have two children. They met while undergraduates at Beloit College.

== See also ==
- List of law clerks for the third seat of the Supreme Court of the United States
