= ImeIme Umana =

American law clerk

- Education: Harvard University
- Occupation: Lawyer
- Known for: First black female president of Harvard Law Review

ImeIme Umana (born 1993) is an American lawyer who served as a law clerk for Robert L. Wilkins and Sonia Sotomayor. She was the 131st president—and the first black female president—of the Harvard Law Review.

== Early life and education ==
Umana was born in State College, Pennsylvania, to Nigerian immigrant parents originally from Akwa Ibom State in Nigeria.

She had her high school education at Susquehanna Township High School in Harrisburg. She graduated from Harvard College in 2014, earning a BA with a joint concentration in African American studies and Government. She earned a degree in law from Harvard and a Master of Public Policy from the Harvard Kennedy School of Government.

== Career ==
While obtaining her bachelor's degree, she served as president of the Harvard Institute of Politics and worked at the university's Hiphop Archive. She interned at the Public Defender Service for the District of Columbia, served as both the Community Action Chair of the Harvard University Institute of Politics and Professional Developmental Chair for Public Interest for the Harvard Black Law Students Association.

On January 29, 2017, she was appointed president of the Harvard Law Review by the review's 92 student editors. She was among 12 candidates, eight of whom were women and eight of whom were people of color. All candidates were made to answer questions from a forum of editors, write responses to submitted questions and participate in mock editorial activities.

Umana served as a law clerk for Robert L. Wilkins of the United States Court of Appeals for the District of Columbia Circuit from 2018 to 2019. She was a law clerk for justice Sonia Sotomayor of the Supreme Court of the United States from 2020 to 2021.

Umana went on to work in the District of Columbia's Public Defender's office. In 2022, she wrote an op-ed in British Vogue about the confirmation of Ketanji Brown Jackson, the first black woman and first former federal public defender to the Supreme Court of the United States.

== Awards ==
- 2017 - African Diaspora Awards
- 2017 - Most Influential People of African Descent Award
- 2019 - Soros Justice Fellows

== See also ==
- List of law clerks for the third seat of the Supreme Court of the United States
