= Kent Greenfield (law professor) =

American lawyer

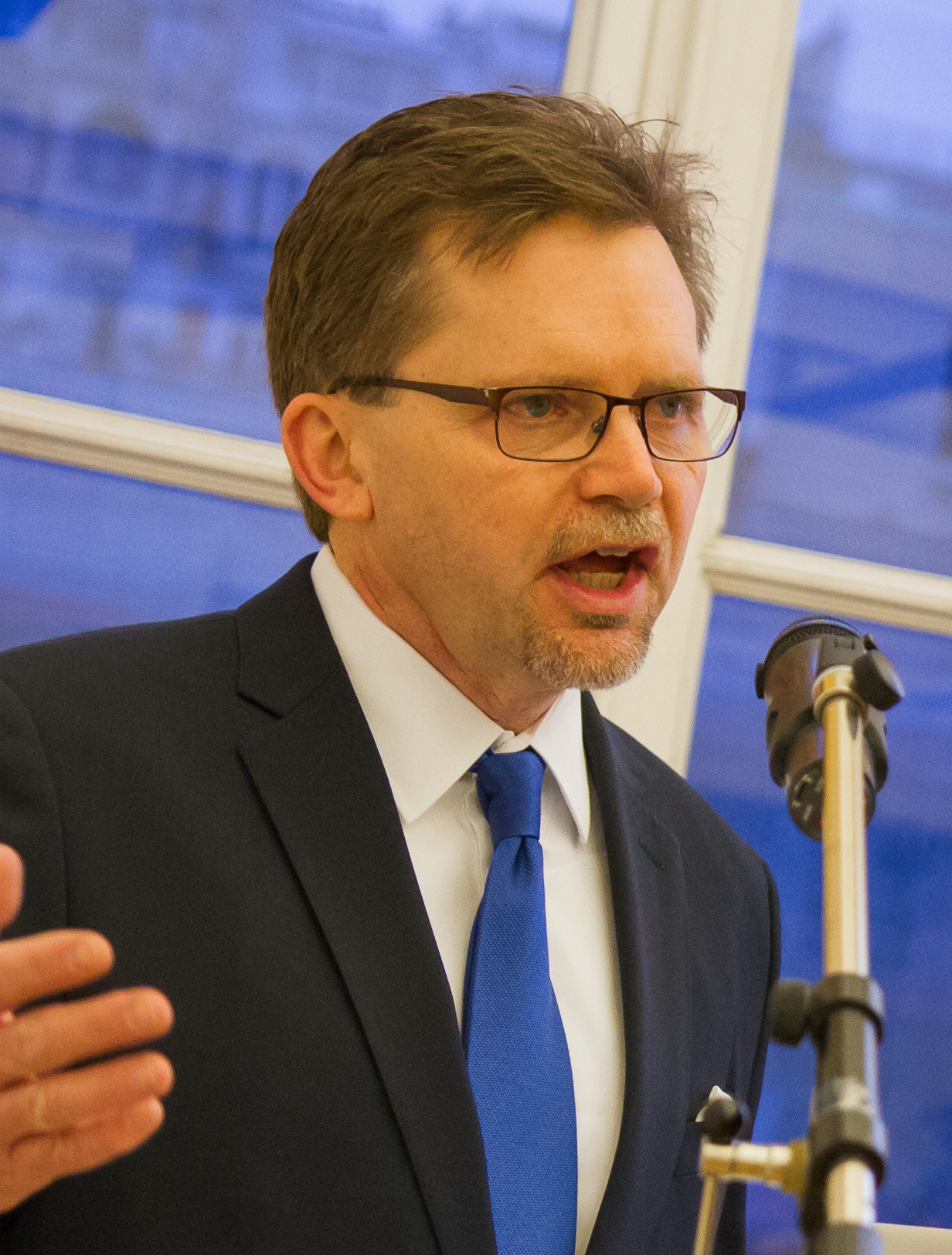
Kent Greenfield in 2015

Kent Greenfield is an American lawyer, Professor of Law and Law Fund Research Scholar at Boston College, and frequent commentator to The Huffington Post. He is the author of The Myth of Choice: Personal Responsibility in a World of Limits and The Failure of Corporate Law: Fundamental Flaws and Progressive Possibilities, published by University of Chicago Press in 2006, and scholarly articles. He is best known for his "stakeholder" critique of the conventional legal doctrine and theory of corporate law, and for his leadership in a legal battle between law schools and the Pentagon over free speech and gay rights.

== Early life and career ==
Greenfield spent most of his childhood in Princeton, Kentucky, where his father worked as a Baptist minister and his mother as a school teacher. Greenfield earned an A.B. in economics and history with honors from Brown University in 1984. After graduating, he worked as a corporate policy advisor at Levi Strauss & Co. in San Francisco, and traveled through South America.

Greenfield graduated with honors from the University of Chicago Law School in 1992 where he served as Topics and Comments Editor of the University of Chicago Law Review and became a member of the Order of the Coif. Upon graduation, he briefly practiced at the law firm Covington & Burling in Washington, D.C.

== Professional career ==
Kent Greenfield clerked for Justice David H. Souter of the United States Supreme Court and Judge Levin H. Campbell of the United States Court of Appeals for the First Circuit before joining the law faculty at Boston College in 1995. He was Visiting Professor of Law at the University of Connecticut School of Law in 2002, Visiting Wallace S. Fujiyama Professor at University of Hawai’i William S. Richardson School of Law in 2005, and Visiting Professor of Political Science at Brown University in 2006. From 2007 to 2008, he served as the Distinguished Faculty Fellow at the Center on Corporations, Law and Society, at the Seattle University School of Law. He has also served as chair of the Business Associations Section of the American Association of Law Schools.

In 2002, Greenfield became involved with a number of legal academics who believed the federal government's policy of excluding gay, lesbian, and bisexual people from service in the military under "Don't Ask, Don't Tell" conflicted with law schools' non-discrimination policies. Law schools typically require potential employers to sign pledges that they will not discriminate against students on various grounds. Recruiters from the military services refused to sign those pledges, and under the so-called Solomon Amendment, law schools and their parent universities stood to lose federal funding federal if they failed to permit military recruiters equal access to recruiting facilities. Greenfield founded and served as the president of the Forum for Academic and Institutional Rights (FAIR), an organization of over thirty law schools and other institutions, which was the named plaintiff in a lawsuit to contest the Solomon Amendment. The suit won in the U.S. Court of Appeals for the Third Circuit but was overturned by the Supreme Court on March 6, 2006. Multiple news outlets, including the New York Times, the Boston Globe, and the Wall Street Journal, have covered Kent Greenfield's activism with FAIR.

== Scholarship ==
The Failure of Corporate Law was called "simply the best and most well-reasoned progressive critique of corporate law yet written" by professor Joseph Singer of Harvard Law School. Professor Singer also noted Failure for challenging conventional wisdom and seeking to broaden the scope of corporate management. Greenfield has published journal articles in the Yale Law Journal, the Virginia Law Review, the Boston College Law Review, the George Washington Law Review, the Tulane Law Review, and others. Greenfield has lectured and presented at numerous institutions nationally and internationally, including at Harvard University, Yale University, Brown University, Stanford University, the University of Chicago, the University of Michigan, and the London School of Economics.

Greenfield's second book The Myth of Choice, forthcoming in October 2011 from Yale University Press, probes the role of free choice theory in American law, sociology, economics, and political theory. Greenfield uses anecdotes, hard data, and judicial opinions to draw inferences about choice in American society and offer policy recommendations and personal advice. Noah Feldman has written that The Myth of Choice unsettles our beliefs, our judgments, and our values.

== Criticism ==
Greenfield's "stakeholder" critique of the conventional theory of corporate law has been criticized for undercutting economic efficiency. Critics argue that the stakeholder theory of corporate governance would damage the American economy by inducing capital to escape the added costs of accountability to more players than corporate shareholders.

== Scholarly publications ==
- "Law, Politics, and the Erosion of Legitimacy in the Delaware Courts." New York Law School Law Review 55 (2010/2011): 481–496.
- "Attorney General Mukasey's Defense of Irresponsibility." Boston College International and Comparative Law Review 32 (Spring 2009): 223–230.
- "Corporate Law and the Rhetoric of Choice." In Law & Economics: Toward Social Justice, edited by Dana L. Gold, 61–89. (Research in Law and Economics, v.24) Bingley, UK: Emerald Group Publishing Limited, 2009.
- "The Origins and Costs of Short-Term Management." In Paper Series on Restoring the Primacy of the Real Economy, Allen White, editor, 26–33. June 2009.
- "Third Panel: How Law Constructs Wealth Patterns." (Panel remarks) Georgetown Journal of Poverty Law and Policy 15 (2008): 509–538.
- "Defending Stakeholder Governance." Case Western Reserve Law Review 58: no.4 (Summer 2008): 1043–1065.
- "The Impact of 'Going Private' on Stakeholders." Brooklyn Journal of Corporate, Financial and Commercial Law 3, no.1 (Fall 2008): 75–88.
- "Proposition: Saving the World With Corporate Law." Emory Law Journal 57: no.4 (2008): 948–984.
- "The Disaster at Bhopal: Lessons for Corporate Law?" New England Law Review 42: no.4 (Summer 2008): 755–760.
- "Corporate Ethics in a Devilish System." Journal of Business & Technology Law 3: issue 2 (2008): 427–435.
- "Reclaiming Corporate Law in a New Gilded Age." Harvard Law and Policy Review 2: no.1 (Winter 2008): 1-32.
- "A New Era for Corporate Law: Using Corporate Governance Law to Benefit All Stakeholders." In Paper Series on Corporate Design: Summit on the Future of the Corporation, Allen White and Marjorie Kelly, editors, 19–28. November 2007.
- "New Principles for Company Law." Keeping Good Companies: Journal of the Chartered Secretaries Australia Ltd. July 2007: 335–339.
- The Failure of Corporate Law: Fundamental Flaws and Progressive Possibilities. Chicago: University of Chicago Press, 2006.
- "Fighting for Equality, and Losing." Boston Bar Journal 50, no.4 (September/October 2006): 27–28.
- "Both Sides [Now]: Higher Education Institutions Have a Right to Dissent Without Losing Federal Money." Trusteeship 14: no.1 (January/February 2006): 35.
- With Adam Sulkowski. "A Bridle, a Prod, and a Big Stick: An Evaluation of Class Actions, Shareholder Proposals, and the Ultra Vires Doctrine as Methods for Controlling Corporate Behavior." St. John's Law Review 79 (Fall 2005): 929–954. (Symposium issue)
- "New Principles for Corporate Law." Hastings Business Law Journal 1 (2005): 87–118.
- "Unconstitutional Constitution Day." Guest op-ed on ACSBlog: The Blog of the American Constitution Society (September 15, 2005).
- "In Closing: Fighting Might with Rights." BC Law Magazine 13: no.2 (Spring/Summer 2005): 56, 54.
- "A Liberal's Disappointment in Million Dollar Baby." Guest op-ed on ACSBlog: The Blog of the American Constitution Society (March 8, 2005).
- "Democracy and Dominance of Delaware in Corporate Law." Law and Contemporary Problems67 (2004): 135–145.
- With Peter C. Kostant. "An Experimental Test of Fairness Under Agency and Profit-Maximization Constraints (With Notes on Implications for Corporate Governance.)" George Washington Law Review 71 (November 2003): 983–1024.
- "Imposing Inequality on Law Schools." Washington Post, Monday, November 10, 2003; A25.
- "September 11 and the End of History for Corporate Law." Tulane Law Review 76 (June 2002) (Socio-Economics and Corporate Law Symposium: The New Corporate Social Responsibility): 1409–1429.
- "It's Time to Federalize Corporate Charters." TomPaine.common sense; A Public Interest Journal (July 2002), available at http://www.tompaine.com/feature.cfm/ID/6081
- "Using Behavioral Economics to Show the Power and Efficiency of Corporate Law as Regulatory Tool." U.C.Davis Law Review 35 (February 2002): 581–644.
- "Ultra Vires Lives! A Stakeholder Analysis of Corporate Illegality (With Notes on How Corporate Law Could Reinforce International Law Norms)." Virginia Law Review 87 (November 2001): 1279–1379. Abstract
- "From Metaphor to Reality in Corporate Law." Stanford Agora: An Online Journal of Legal Perspectives 2: issue 1 (2001): 59-68 (https://web.archive.org/web/20021201212421/http://www.law.stanford.edu/agora/) Abstract
- "There's a Forest in those Trees: Teaching About the Role of Corporations in Society." Georgia Law Review 34 (Winter 2000) [Symposium: Business Law Education]: 1011–1024. Abstract
- "Truth or Consequences: If a Company Lies, Employees Should be Able to Sue," Washington Post, Sunday June 28, 1998, Outlook section. [Reprinted as "Workers Should Be Able to Sue Over Lies," Salt Lake City Tribune, July 5, 1998; "It's Illegal to Lie to Stockholders, But Not to Employees," Sacramento Bee, July 6, 1998; "If Company Lies, Allow Workers to Sue," Des Moines Register, July 7, 1998.]
- "The Place of Workers in Corporate Law." Boston College Law Review 39 (March 1998): 283–327.
- "From Rights to Regulation in Corporate Law." In Perspectives on Company Law: 2, edited by Fiona Patfield, 1-25. London: Kluwer Law International, 1997.
- With John E. Nilsson. "Gradgrind's Education: Using Dickens and Aristotle to Understand (and Replace?) the Business Judgment Rule." Brooklyn Law Review 63 (Fall 1997): 799–859.
- "The Unjustified Absence of Federal Fraud Protection in the Labor Market."Yale Law Journal 107 (December 1997): 715-789.
- "Cruelty and Original Intent: a Socratic Dialogue." Indiana Law Journal 72 (Winter 1996): 31–40. [Reprinted in Boston College Law School Magazine 5 (Fall 1996):27- 31.]
- "Our Conflicting Judgments about Pornography." American University Law Review 43 (Spring 1994): 1197–1230.
- "Original Penumbras: Constitutional Interpretation in the First Year of Congress." Connecticut Law Review 26 (Fall 1993): 79–144.
- "Cameras in Teddy Bears: Electronic Visual Surveillance and the Fourth Amendment."University of Chicago Law Review 58 (Summer 1991): 1045-1077. [Also appears in Insurance Law Review 1992–1993, volume 4, edited by Pat Magarick, 435-467. New York: Clark Boardman, 1993.]

== Honors and awards ==
- Received the first annual Business & Law Society Award "for Inspirational Achievement," Boston College Law School, April 12, 2007.
- Received the first annual Leadership Award from the Lambda Students Association at Harvard Law School, April, 2006.
- Recipient, on behalf of Forum for Academic and Institutional Rights (FAIR) of the Kevin Larkin Memorial Award for Public Service, from the Massachusetts Lesbian and Gay Bar Association, 2005.
- B.C. Law Teacher of the Year for 2003–04, given by the Law Students Association (on vote of entire student body).
- Outstanding Teacher Award (the Emil Slizewski Award), given by graduating class of 2004.
- "Friend" Award, given by B.C.'s Lambda Law Students' Association, 2004.
- Received named Law School scholarships from 2003 to the present (Thomas Carney Scholar, 2003–2004; Zamparelli Scholar, 2005; Law Fund Scholar, 2006–present) in recognition of outstanding scholarly contributions.

== See also ==
- List of law clerks for the third seat of the Supreme Court of the United States
