= Michael Klausner =

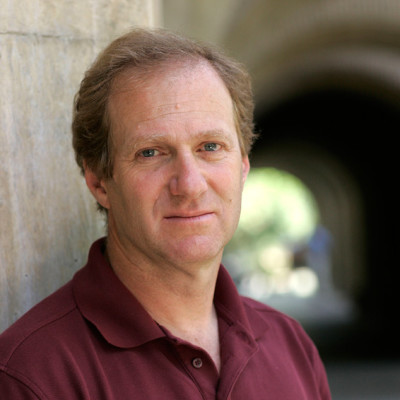
- Born: 1954 (age 71–72)
- Education: University of Pennsylvania (BA); Yale University (MA, JD)
- Occupation: Law professor
- Spouse: Barbara Sih Klausner

Michael Klausner (born 1954) is the Nancy and Charles Munger Professor of Business and Professor of Law at Stanford Law School. He has been a member of the Stanford Law School faculty since 1997. He works in the areas of corporate law, corporate governance, and financial regulation.

== Education ==
Klausner graduated summa cum laude from the University of Pennsylvania with a Bachelor of Arts in Political Science and Urban Studies. He went on to study law at Yale Law School, earning a Juris Doctor with a joint Master of Arts in Economics. At Yale, Klausner was the Notes and Topics editor for the Yale Law Journal.

== Academic and professional career ==
After finishing law school in 1981, Klausner clerked for Justice William J. Brennan Jr. of the U.S. Supreme Court and Judge David L. Bazelon of the U.S. Court of Appeals for the District of Columbia Circuit. He then worked as an associate with Paul, Weiss, Rifkind, Wharton & Garrison and Gibson, Dunn & Crutcher. Following his work as a corporate law practitioner, Klausner served as a White House Fellow in the Office of Policy Development under George H. W. Bush. In 1991, he joined the New York University School of Law faculty as a professor until 1997 when he became a professor at Stanford.

== Key works ==
- Michael Klausner, Outside Director Liability, 58 Stanford Law Review 1055 (2006). (with Bernard Black and Brian Cheffins)
- Michael Klausner, Outside Director Liability: A Policy Analysis, 162 Journal of Institutional and Theoretical Economics 5 (2006). (with Bernard S. Black and Brian R. Cheffins)
- Michael Klausner, When Time Isn't Money: Foundation Payouts and the Time Value of Money, 41 Exempt Organization Tax Review 421-428 (September 2003).
- Robert M. Daines and Michael Klausner, Do IPO Charters Maximize Firm Value? Antitakeover Protection in IPOs, 17 Journal of Law, Economics, & Organization 83-120 (April 2001).
- Michael Klausner, Corporations, Corporate Law, and Networks of Contracts, 81 Virginia Law Review 757-852 (1995).

== See also ==
- List of law clerks for the third seat of the Supreme Court of the United States
