= Raymond Lohier =

Canadian-American judge (born 1965)

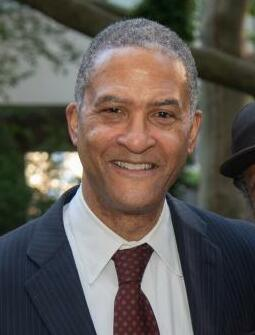
- Lohier in 2021

Chief Judge of the United States Court of Appeals for the Second Circuit
- Incumbent
- Assumed office July 1, 2026
- Preceded by: Debra Ann Livingston

Judge of the United States Court of Appeals for the Second Circuit
- Incumbent
- Assumed office December 20, 2010
- Appointed by: Barack Obama
- Preceded by: Sonia Sotomayor

Personal details
- Born: Raymond Joseph Lohier Jr. December 1, 1965 (age 60) Montreal, Canada
- Education: Harvard University (AB); New York University (JD)

Raymond Joseph Lohier Jr. (born December 1, 1965) is a Canadian-born American lawyer who serves as the chief United States circuit judge of the United States Court of Appeals for the Second Circuit. Formerly, he was an assistant United States attorney for the Southern District of New York and a senior trial attorney in the United States Department of Justice Civil Rights Division. He was the chief of the securities and commodities fraud task force in the criminal division of the U.S. Attorney's office. He was recommended by New York Senator Charles Schumer for nomination to the seat on the Second Circuit that was vacated by Judge Sonia Sotomayor when she was elevated to the Supreme Court of the United States. Lohier is the first Haitian-American to serve as an Article III federal judge and to be confirmed by the United States Senate as a judge.

== Early life and education ==
Lohier Jr. was born in Montreal, Quebec. He is of Haitian heritage. He graduated from Friends' Central School in Philadelphia in 1984. He went on to earn a Bachelor of Arts degree, graduating cum laude from Harvard College, followed by a Juris Doctor from the New York University School of Law, where he served as Editor in Chief of the NYU Annual Survey of American Law. He worked as a law clerk for Judge Robert P. Patterson Jr. of the United States District Court for the Southern District of New York.

== Career ==
Early in his career, Lohier worked as an associate in the law firm Cleary Gottlieb Steen & Hamilton in New York City. From 1997 to 2000, Lohier served as a Senior Trial Attorney with the United States Department of Justice Civil Rights Division, where he worked under Bill Lann Lee and spearheaded employment discrimination-related litigation and worked on other civil rights matters of importance to the federal government. He became an Assistant United States Attorney in 2000, and later became chief of the narcotics unit. He later became chief of the Securities and Commodities Fraud Task Force.

Lohier may be most known in his career at the U.S. Attorney's office for having helped to oversee the investigation into the Madoff investment scandal and worked as a prosecutor on the Marc Dreier case.

=== Federal judicial service ===
On February 8, 2010, Chuck Schumer announced that he would recommend Lohier for a seat on the United States Court of Appeals for the Second Circuit that was vacated by Sonia Sotomayor, who was elevated to the Supreme Court of the United States on August 6, 2009. On March 10, 2010, President Barack Obama nominated Lohier to the seat. On December 19, 2010, the Senate confirmed Lohier by a 92–0 vote. He received his judicial commission on December 20, 2010. He became chief judge of the court in 2026.

== Personal life ==
Lohier's wife, Donna Hae Kyun Lee, is Senior Associate Dean of Clinical Programs and a professor at the CUNY School of Law. The couple married in 1999 and live in Brooklyn, New York. In 2021, Lohier was elected to the Harvard Board of Overseers for a six-year term ending in 2027. In May 2026, Harvard University announced that Lohier would serve as the president of the Board of Overseers for the 2026-2027 academic year. Lohier is also an elected member of the American Law Institute.

== See also ==
- List of African-American federal judges
- List of African-American jurists

Legal offices
Preceded by Sonia Sotomayor	Judge of the United States Court of Appeals for the Second Circuit; 2010–present	Incumbent
Preceded by Debra Ann Livingston	Chief Judge of the United States Court of Appeals for the Second Circuit; 2026–present	Incumbent
