= Debra Ann Livingston =

American judge (born 1959)

Debra Livingston
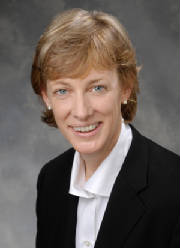
- Livingston in 2007

Senior Judge of the United States Court of Appeals for the Second Circuit
- Incumbent
- Assumed office July 1, 2026

Chief Judge of the United States Court of Appeals for the Second Circuit
- In office September 1, 2020 – July 1, 2026
- Preceded by: Robert Katzmann
- Succeeded by: Raymond Lohier

Judge of the United States Court of Appeals for the Second Circuit
- In office May 17, 2007 – July 1, 2026
- Appointed by: George W. Bush
- Preceded by: John M. Walker Jr.
- Succeeded by: Matthew Schwartz

Personal details
- Born: April 15, 1959 (age 67) Waycross, Georgia, U.S.
- Education: Princeton University (BA); Harvard University (JD)

Debra Ann Livingston (born April 15, 1959) is an American lawyer who serves as a senior United States circuit judge of the United States Court of Appeals for the Second Circuit.

== Early life and education ==
Livingston was born in Waycross, Georgia, and received a Bachelor of Arts degree, magna cum laude, from the Woodrow Wilson School of Public and International Affairs at Princeton University in 1980 and a Juris Doctor, magna cum laude, from Harvard Law School in 1984, where she served as an editor of the Harvard Law Review.

== Career ==
Livingston served as a law clerk for Judge J. Edward Lumbard of the United States Court of Appeals for the Second Circuit after graduating from law school. From 1986 to 1991, she was an assistant United States attorney in the Southern District of New York, where she handled criminal cases, including the prosecution of Ferdinand Marcos, former President of the Philippines. After working as a legal consultant to the United Nations High Commissioner for Refugees, Livingston was an associate at Paul, Weiss, Rifkind, Wharton & Garrison, a New York City law firm. From 1994 to 2003, she served as commissioner of the New York City Civilian Complaint Review Board. From 1992 to 1994, Livingston taught criminal procedure and evidence at the University of Michigan Law School. She joined the faculty of Columbia Law School in 1994, and continued to teach there as a Paul J. Kellner Professor of Law following her nomination to the bench. From 2005 to 2006, she served as the vice dean.

She is one of the authors of Comprehensive Criminal Procedure.

== Federal judicial service ==
On June 28, 2006, Livingston was nominated by President George W. Bush to fill former Chief Judge John M. Walker, Jr.'s seat on the Second Circuit. That nomination was returned to the president when the 109th Congress adjourned. Bush renominated Livingston on January 9, 2007, to the 110th Congress. The Senate Judiciary Committee held a hearing on her nomination on April 11, 2007, and favorably reported her nomination on April 25, 2007. The Senate confirmed her nomination on May 9, 2007, by a 91–0 vote, almost one year after she was first nominated. She received her commission on May 17, 2007. She became chief judge on September 1, 2020.

In February 2026, Livingston announced that she would assume Senior Status on July 1, 2026.

=== Notable rulings ===
In December 2019, Livingston partially dissented from a federal appeals court ruling ordering that Donald Trump comply with a subpoena and turn over his tax returns to the U.S. House of Representatives. She stated, "I cannot accept the majority's conclusions that 'this case does not concern separation of powers,' and that there is 'minimal at best' risk of distraction to this and future Presidents from legislative subpoenas of this sort." Livingston said she would have sent the case back to a lower court and required the House committees to provide more details about the legislative purposes behind their requests before deciding whether the banks must comply.

Legal offices
| Preceded by John M. Walker Jr. | Judge of the United States Court of Appeals for the Second Circuit; 2007–2026 | Succeeded by Matthew Schwartz |
| Preceded by Robert Katzmann | Chief Judge of the United States Court of Appeals for the Second Circuit; 2020–2026 | Succeeded by Raymond Lohier |
