= Comparative federalism =

Term from political science

Comparative federalism is a branch of comparative politics and comparative government, the main focus of which is the study of the nature, operation, possibilities and effects of federal governance forms across two or more cases.

Comparative studies cover the most important aspects of federalism, i.e. theory, institutions, constitutions including constitutional laws, foundations, establishment and organization of federal systems, functions or a system of relations between administrative structures at various levels and financial issues, for example, the distribution of tax revenues and expenditures. One more aspect can be added to this — examples of the functioning of federal systems and problems that arise when implementing a federal organization.

Currently, comparative federalism is the core of federalism research. It is applicable to any topic in the field, including second chambers, courts, intergovernmental councils, the trajectory of federations, practices of fiscal federalism, accommodation of potentially conflicting identity groups, and secessionism.

== Origin ==
The ubiquity of comparative federalism is directly related to the development of comparative studies and their prevalence in other fields of political science. The evolution of comparative politics is seen as punctuated by two revolutions: the behavioral revolution, during the immediate post-World War II years until the mid-1960s, and the second scientific revolution, which started around the end of the Cold War and is still ongoing. On both occasions, the impetus for change came from developments in the field of American politics and was justified in the name of science.

The surge in the use of comparative methods in federalism research can be attributed to the above-mentioned events, since federalism first became a significant field of study in the mid-twentieth century. For many years federalism was considered an object that did not deserve the attention of political scientists, except as a system of relations between governments of various levels in special federal entities, primarily in the United States. However, in the second half of the twentieth century, it became one of the key topics of world politics and, accordingly, political science, as the number of federal states increased, as well as the interaction of many states at the supranational level acquired the features of federalism. These phenomena coincided with the popularization of comparative politics, which led to the emergence and spread of the approach of comparative federalism in political science.

== Classification ==
Comparative studies of federalism can be divided into three main groups:

Federalism in English-speaking countries, including colonial federalism, for example in the United Kingdom
Federalism in German-speaking countries, primarily in Germany and Switzerland
Federalist ideologies and projects put forward for the most part by philosophers — supporters of utopian federal systems.

== Features ==
By taking into consideration the methods and experiences of many cases, comparative federalism aims to go beyond what can be learned from the study of a single federation:

- Understands federalism as a general phenomenon

By drawing comparisons between the operations of various federations, comparative federalism enables us to view federalism as a universal phenomenon. If federalism is a general category of government, then there are limits to what one case can tell us about it and to what one can learn about the applicability of federal-type arrangements to political challenges.

- Emphasizes the uniqueness of a particular case

Comparative federalism sheds light on the characteristics of any given scenario, both typical and unusual, and offers suggestions for alternative approaches. "It is all too easy when immersed in the politics of one country to lapse into a parochialism that takes the status quo for granted".

- Proposes explanations about how federal systems come into being, function, and evolve

A thorough description of a specific case and its process tracing can serve as a solid foundation for a causal explanation, but comparative federalism provides an external confirmation, which is typically viewed as very desirable. More reliable conclusions are based on hypotheses that were examined over a number of other examples.

== Multi-level governance ==
Early in the 1990s, a new method of studying the European integration process called "multi-level governance" appeared. It aimed to broaden the scope of the analysis by including institutional layers above and beyond the intergovernmental or supranational viewpoints. This research brought in findings from comparative federalism and depicted the European Union as a unique (quasi-federal) system characterized by a distinctive interconnection among multiple levels of governance. "EU is an outlier in comparative federalism: a federation-in-the-making with confederal characteristics".

Research on multi-level governance has spurred innovation in comparative federalism. While traditional comparative federalism, by stressing legal and administrative aspects, has limited itself to the study of federal countries, it is conceivable to extend the insight gained to multi-level regimes. The interconnection between these approaches promotes new discoveries in the field of each of them.

=== Impact of the theory ===
The comparative study of the federal system has benefited from various advances provided by the theory of multi-level governance:

- New levels of government considered

Especially in European federal systems such as Germany and Switzerland, multi-level governance points to the increasingly significant interplays between different domestic and supranational governance levels. At the same time, research on multi-level governance rekindled interest in subnational units, departments and urban areas.

- Shift from the study of federal constitutions to the study of interplay among actors at multiple governmental tiers

The concept of multi-level governance allowed comparative federalism academics to think about federal systems as being influenced and formed by different interactional patterns, and not only as centralized polities characterized by a certain distribution of authority and resources. This actor-centered interpretation of federalism helped to improve comparative studies of federalism, which now includes a wide range of federal and non-federal systems.

- Increase in attention to individual policy areas and policy performance

Due to the critical role that decentralization plays in fostering global economic development and good governance, comparative studies of economic performance, the political economics of federalism, and fiscal federalism have received significant attention in comparative federalism.
