= Trey Whitfield School =

Elementary school in New York, USA

Coordinates: 40°40′29.94″N 73°54′3.97″W

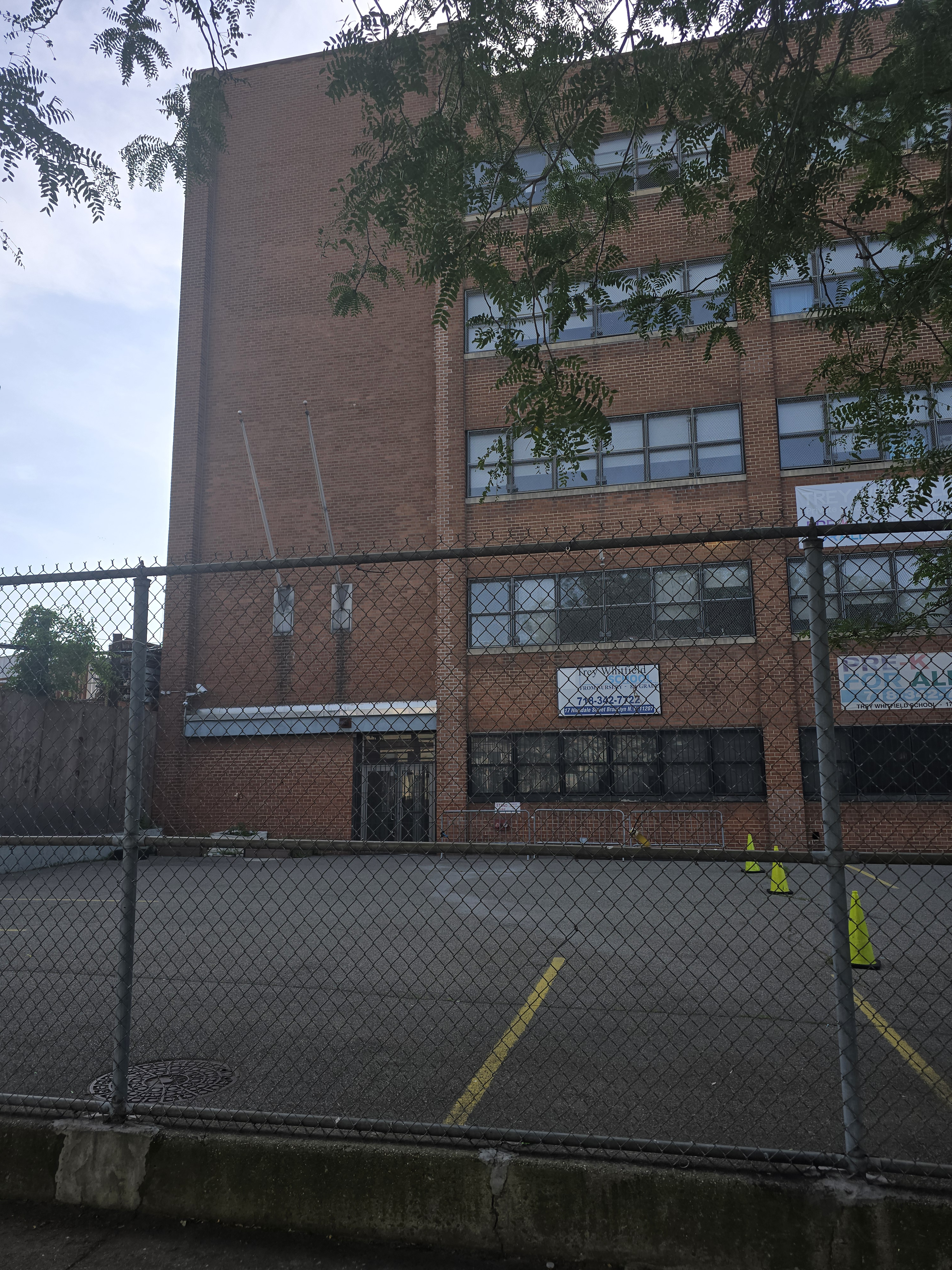

Information
- Former name: Bethlehem Baptist Academy
- Founder: Ms. Janie C. Whitney
- Website: www.treywhitfieldschool.org

Trey Whitfield School is a private educational institution located in East New York, Brooklyn, New York, US.

== History ==
The school was originally founded as Bethlehem Baptist Academy by Ms. Janie C. Whitney. She was supported by A.B. Whitfield. The institution was later renamed in honor of their son, Trey Whitfield, who died in a boating accident shortly before his high school graduation.

== Campus ==
Since 2005, Trey Whitfield School has operated from a renovated five-story building.
