= Robert Katzmann =

American judge (1953–2021)

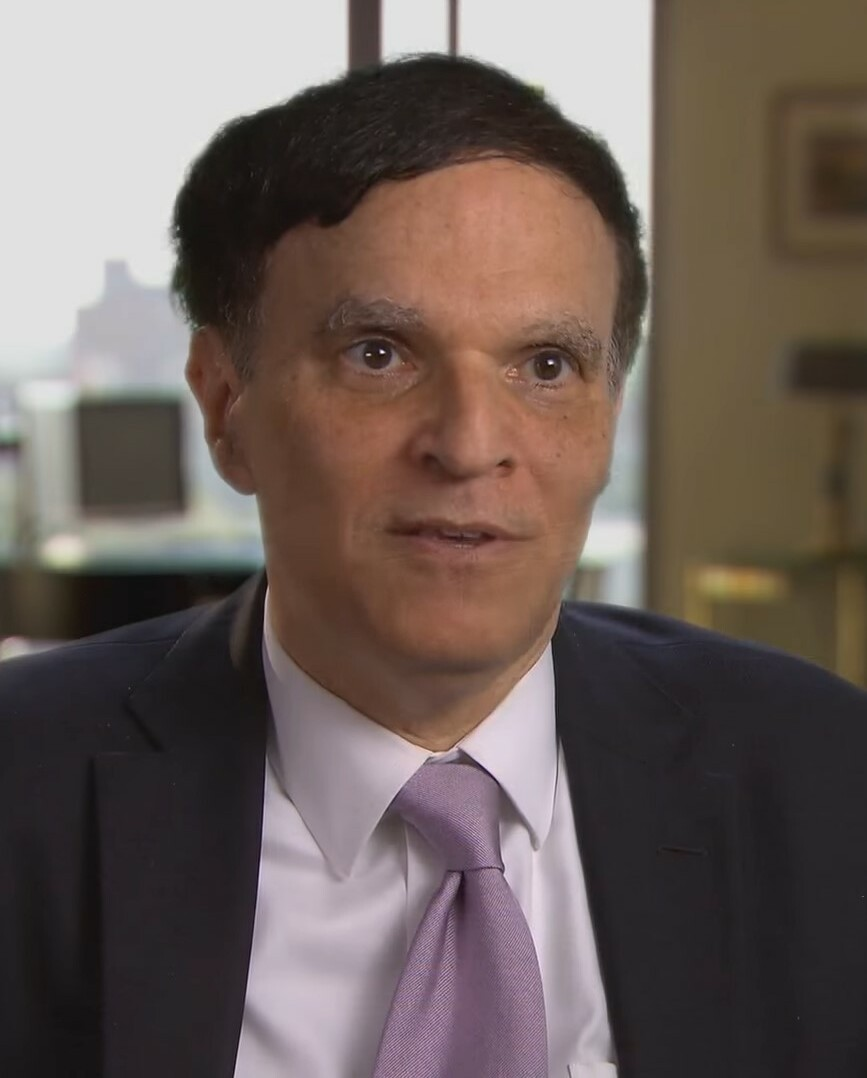
- Katzmann in 2017

Senior Judge of the United States Court of Appeals for the Second Circuit
- In office January 21, 2021 – June 9, 2021

Chief Judge of the United States Court of Appeals for the Second Circuit
- In office September 1, 2013 – August 31, 2020
- Preceded by: Dennis Jacobs
- Succeeded by: Debra Ann Livingston

Judge of the United States Court of Appeals for the Second Circuit
- In office July 14, 1999 – January 21, 2021
- Appointed by: Bill Clinton
- Preceded by: Jon O. Newman
- Succeeded by: Eunice C. Lee

Personal details
- Born: Robert Allen Katzmann; April 22, 1953 New York City, U.S.
- Died: June 9, 2021 (aged 68) New York City, U.S.
- Relatives: Gary Katzmann (brother)
- Education: Columbia University (BA); Harvard University (MA, PhD); Yale University (JD)

Robert Allen Katzmann (April 22, 1953 – June 9, 2021) was a United States circuit judge of the United States Court of Appeals for the Second Circuit. He served as chief judge from September 1, 2013, to August 31, 2020.

== Early life and education ==
Robert Allen Katzmann was born April 22, 1953, in New York City, the son of Sylvia, a homemaker, and John Katzmann, an engineer. His identical twin, Gary, is a judge on the United States Court of International Trade.

Katzmann received a Bachelor of Arts degree from Columbia University in 1973. He received a Master of Arts from Harvard University in 1976 and received a Ph.D. from Harvard in 1978. He received a Juris Doctor from Yale Law School in 1980, where he was an article and book review editor of the Yale Law Journal.

== Career ==
=== Early work ===
Katzmann served as a law clerk to Judge Hugh H. Bownes of the United States Court of Appeals for the First Circuit from 1980 to 1981. He was a fellow at the Brookings Institution from 1981 to 1999. He was an adjunct professor at Georgetown University Law Center from 1984 to 1989. He was an adjunct professor with the Georgetown University Public Policy Program from 1987 to 1992. Katzmann was president of the Governance Institute from 1986 to 1999. He was a special assistant to the director of the Federal Judicial Center from 1986 to 1988. He was a visiting professor of the University of California, Los Angeles (Washington, D.C., program), from 1990 to 1992. In 1993, he served as the Wayne Morse Chair of Law and Politics, established in honor of the late former Senator, at the University of Oregon. He was acting program director at the Brookings Institution in 1998, and the Walsh Professor of Government, professor of law and professor of public policy at Georgetown University from 1992 to 1999.

=== Federal judicial service ===
Katzmann was nominated by President Bill Clinton on March 8, 1999, to a seat on the United States Court of Appeals for the Second Circuit vacated by Judge Jon O. Newman. He was confirmed by the United States Senate by voice vote on July 14, 1999, and received his commission on July 16, 1999. He served as chief judge from September 1, 2013, to August 31, 2020. By appointment of Chief Justice John Roberts, Katzmann has served as chair of the U.S. Judicial Conference Committee on the Judicial Branch, as a member of the U.S. Judicial Conference Executive Committee, and as chair of the Supreme Court Fellows Commission. On January 21, 2021, Katzmann assumed senior status. Katzmann is the first federal judge to hold a doctorate in government.

=== Notable decisions ===
In Watson v. United States (2017), Katzmann in dissent decried the government's wrongful detention of a U.S. citizen for 1,273 days, arguing that Watson should be entitled to sue the government for damages.

In August 2017, Katzmann upheld the insider trading conviction of Mathew Martoma, over the dissent of Judge Pooler, who argued that the majority was improperly overruling circuit precedent. In June 2018, Katzmann issued an amended opinion reaching the same result, again over the dissent of Pooler.

In a landmark Second Circuit ruling, Zarda v Altitude Express (2018) Judge Katzmann, writing for the full court in a 10–3 decision, held that Title VII of the Civil Rights Act of 1964 prohibits employment discrimination on the basis of sexual orientation. That decision was later affirmed by the Supreme Court of the United States in the consolidated case of Bostock v. Clayton County.

In Corren v. Condos (2018), Judge Katzmann upheld Vermont's public financing campaign laws against First Amendment challenges.

In the Second Circuit's Trump v. Vance (2019) opinion, Judge Katzmann, writing for a unanimous three-judge panel, held that the president is not immune from the enforcement of a state grand jury subpoena directing a third party to produce non-privileged material, even when the subject matter under investigation pertains to the President and that a state grand jury may permissibly issue subpoenas in aid of its investigation of potential crimes committed by persons within its jurisdiction, even if that investigation may in some way implicate the President. In June 2020, the Supreme Court affirmed that ruling.

=== Other activities, writings and awards ===
Katzmann wrote articles on a variety of subjects, including judicial-congressional relations, statutory interpretation, the administrative process, regulation, court reform, access to justice for immigrants, civic education, disability, and the war powers resolution. He has offered courses on administrative law, statutory interpretation, constitutional law, and the judiciary. He was professor of practice at N.Y.U. School of Law.

Katzmann's work on interbranch relations began at the invitation of the U.S. Judicial Conference Committee on the Judicial Branch, then chaired by Judge Frank M. Coffin. Judge Katzmann also directed a project on the legal profession and public service at The Brookings Institution, which considered the law firm and the public good.

Katzmann was a board director of the American Judicature Society, a public member of the Administrative Conference of the United States, and a vice-chair of the Committee on Government Organization and Separation of Powers of the ABA Section on Administrative Law and Regulatory Practice. He has also been a consultant to the Federal Courts Study Committee. He served as co-chair of the FTC transition team, and as special counsel to Senator Daniel Patrick Moynihan on the confirmation of Justice Ruth Bader Ginsburg. He has also been chair of the Section on Legislation of the Association of American Law Schools. Katzmann was a member of the Board of Trustees of the New York Public Library, the Board of Visitors of Georgetown University Law Center, the Board of Directors of the Institute of Judicial Administration of NYU, the advisory board of Roosevelt House of Hunter College, and a member of the National Board of Academic Advisors of the Rehnquist Center located in the James E. Rogers College of Law at the University of Arizona. He was recipient of the American Political Science Association's Charles E. Merriam Award (2001), "given to a person whose published work and career represents a significant contribution to the art of government through the application of social science research." Since 2003, Judge Katzmann has been a Fellow of the American Academy of Arts and Sciences.

For his judicial writing, Katzmann was recognized as an "Exemplary Legal Writing 2008" honoree by the Green Bag, a journal dedicated to good legal writing. Judge Katzmann has also been awarded: the Learned Hand Medal for Excellence in Federal Jurisprudence of the Federal Bar Council; the Chesterfield Smith Award of the Pro Bono Institute, presented by Justice Ruth Bader Ginsburg; the Thurgood Marshall Award of the American Bar Association; the Stanley H. Fuld Award of the New York State Bar Association; the Edward Weinfeld Award of the New York County Lawyers Association, presented by Robert M. Morgenthau; NYU Annual Survey of American Law Dedicatee; Honorary Doctor of Law degrees from New York Law School, John Jay College of Criminal Justice and Pace University; the Michael Maggio Memorial Pro Bono Award of the American Immigration Lawyers Association; Sanctuary for Families' Abeley Award; Burton Award for Education in Law; Public Service Champion of Legal Outreach and the Public Interest Scholarship Organization Lifetime Achievement Award. His lectures include: the James Madison Lecture of New York University School of Law; the Orison Marden Lecture of the NYC Bar Association; and the Robert L. Levine Distinguished Lecture of Fordham University School of Law.

The New York Times reported on Katzmann's efforts to foster effective legal representation of the immigrant poor with worthy claims. To raise awareness about the crisis of inadequate legal representation of non-citizens and its adverse effect on the administration of justice, he gave in 2007 the Marden Lecture of the New York City Bar Association, "The Legal Profession and the Unmet Needs of the Immigrant Poor." That led to his launching of an interdisciplinary Study Group on Immigrant Representation, from which emanated the New York Immigrant Family Unity Project, the first government-funded program of legal counsel for detained noncitizens. He conceived of and sparked the creation of the Immigrant Justice Corps, the country's first fellowship program dedicated to meeting the need for high-quality legal assistance for immigrants, described in a New York Times editorial as "a groundbreaking effort."

Katzmann's tenure as Chief Judge was described as “remarkable” and pioneering. As Chief Judge, he launched a civic education initiative of the federal courts of the Second Circuit, Justice For All: Courts and the Community. The project, with the active participation of judges, court staff, the bar, and educators, encompasses a wide range of activities and seeks to increase public understanding of the role and operations of the federal courts and bring courts closer to the communities they serve. Chief Judge Katzmann convened, along with Administrative Office of the U.S. Courts Director, James C. Duff, the first national conference on civic education and the federal courts, at the Thurgood Marshall U.S. Courthouse in New York City, in October 2019. Conferees included three Supreme Court Justices – Breyer, Sotomayor and Gorsuch – as well as judges and educators from across the country. During his term as Chief Judge, the Second Circuit Court of Appeals engaged in a year-long 125th anniversary retrospective on the history of the court, a collaborative effort of judges, staff, and the bar, resulting in a book of judicial biographies, a volume on the jurisprudence of the Second Circuit, and a variety of public programs.

In his judicial role, Judge Katzmann presided over the largest naturalization ceremony in the history of Ellis Island and the first naturalization ceremony on the rebuilt World Trade Center site.

In September 2014, Oxford University Press published Katzmann's book, Judging Statutes. Praised by Justice John Paul Stevens (retired), "as illuminating and convincing" and "required reading for all lawyers confronting questions of statutory construction," the book has been the subject of several commentaries, and programs. Critiquing textualism, Katzmann argues that when interpreting the laws of Congress, courts should respect the legislative materials Congress thinks are important, so as to better understand legislative meaning and purposes.

In February 2020, the Vilcek Foundation announced Chief Judge Katzmann as the recipient of the 2020 Vilcek Prize for Excellence in the Administration of Justice "in recognition of his exemplary career in public service, as well as his commitment to broadening access to legal representation for immigrants in need."

== Death ==
Katzmann died on June 9, 2021, at a Manhattan hospital from pancreatic cancer, aged 68.

== Selected publications ==
- Regulatory Bureaucracy: The Federal Trade Commission and Antitrust Policy (MIT Press 1980; paperback with new afterword, 1981) ISBN 978-0-262-61034-6
- Institutional Disability: The Saga of Transportation Policy for the Disabled (Brookings Inst Pr August 1986) ISBN 978-0-8157-4833-5
- Managing Appeals in Federal Court, co-editor (Federal Judicial Center, 1988) ASIN B000IKDJBE
- Daniel Patrick Moynihan: The Intellectual in Public Life, editor and contributing author (Johns Hopkins, 1998) ISBN 978-0-8018-7967-8
- Judges and Legislators: Toward Institutional Comity, editor and contributing author, (Brookings Inst Pr, 1988) ISBN 978-0-8157-4862-5
- The Law Firm and the Public Good (Brookings Inst Pr, May 1995) ISBN 978-0-8157-4863-2
- Courts and Congress (Brookings Inst Pr, May 1997) ISBN 978-0-8157-4865-6
- The Marden Lecture: The Legal Profession and the Unmet Needs of the Immigrant Poor, 21 Geo. J. of Legal Ethics 3 (2008)
- Madison Lecture: Statutes, 87 NYU L. Rev. 637 (2012)
- When Legal Representation is Deficient: The Challenge of Immigration Cases for the Courts, 143 Daedalus (summer 2014) 37
- Judging Statutes (Oxford University Press, 2014) ISBN 978-0-19-936213-4
- Study Group on Immigrant Representation: The First Decade, 87 Fordham L. Rev. 485 (2018)
- Thomas E. Fairchild Lecture: Civic Education and the Federal Courts, 2019 University of Wisconsin L. Rev. 397 (2019)
- Dedication to Judge Robert A. Katzmann, 75 NYU Annual Survey of American Law 1 (2019)

== See also ==
- Barack Obama Supreme Court candidates
- List of Jewish American jurists

Legal offices
| Preceded by Jon O. Newman | Judge of the United States Court of Appeals for the Second Circuit; 1999–2021 | Succeeded by Eunice C. Lee |
| Preceded by Dennis Jacobs | Chief Judge of the United States Court of Appeals for the Second Circuit; 2013–2020 | Succeeded by Debra Ann Livingston |
