= Kiyo A. Matsumoto =

American judge (born 1955)

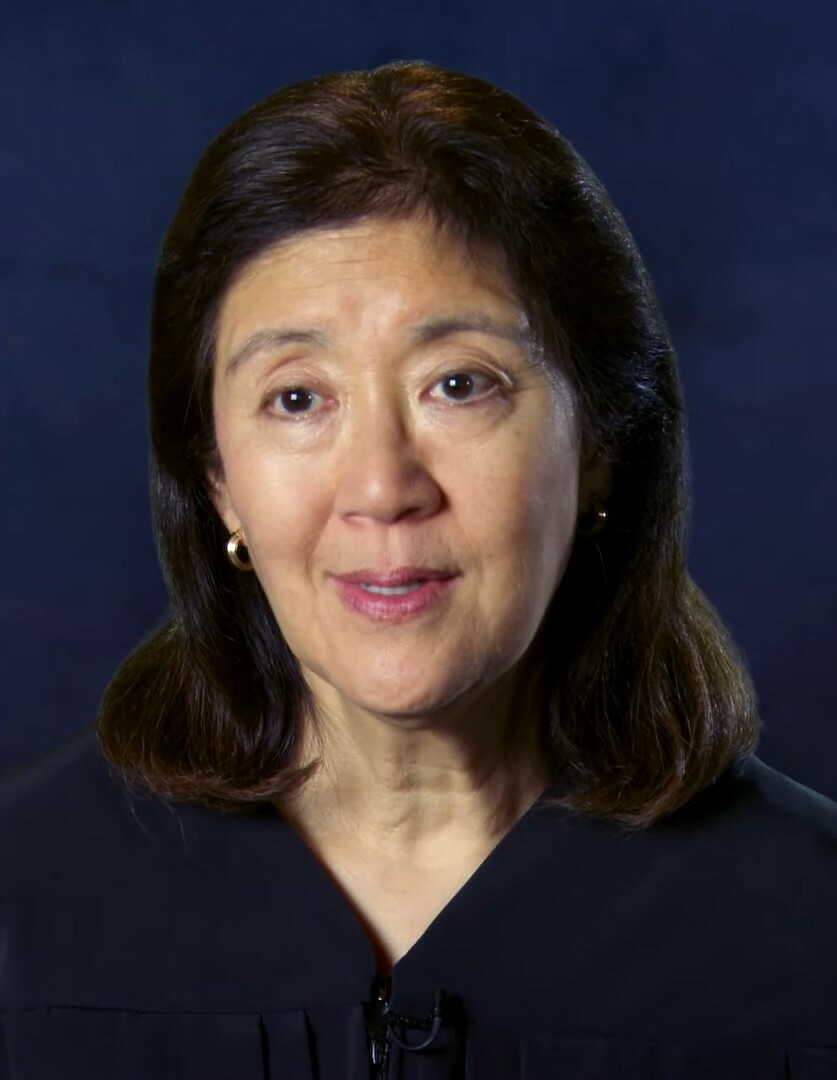
- Matsumoto in 2021

Senior Judge of the United States District Court for the Eastern District of New York
- Incumbent
- Assumed office July 23, 2022

Judge of the United States District Court for the Eastern District of New York
- In office July 22, 2008 – July 23, 2022
- Appointed by: George W. Bush
- Preceded by: Edward R. Korman
- Succeeded by: Ramon Reyes

Magistrate Judge of the United States District Court for the Eastern District of New York
- In office 2004–2008

Personal details
- Born: 1955 (age 70–71) Raleigh, North Carolina, U.S.
- Education: University of California, Berkeley (BA); Georgetown University (JD)

Kiyo A. Matsumoto (born 1955) is a senior United States district judge of the United States District Court for the Eastern District of New York.

== Early life and education ==
Born in Raleigh, North Carolina, Matsumoto graduated from the University of California, Berkeley with her Bachelor of Arts degree in 1976 and later from the Georgetown University Law Center with a Juris Doctor in 1981.

== Career ==
Matsumoto was a private practice attorney in Seattle from 1981 to 1983 before joining the United States Attorney's Office as assistant United States attorney for the Eastern District of New York from 1983 to 2004. Matsumoto served as an adjunct professor of law at New York University School of Law from 1998 to 2004.

=== Federal judicial service ===
From 2004 to 2008, Matsumoto served as a United States magistrate judge in the Eastern District of New York. In 2008, Matsumoto was nominated to the U.S. District Court for the Eastern District of New York by President George W. Bush on March 11, 2008, to a seat vacated by Judge Edward R. Korman. Matsumoto was confirmed by the Senate on July 17, 2008, on a majority vote and received commission on July 22, 2008. She assumed senior status on July 23, 2022.

Born to second-generation Japanese American parents, Matsumoto became the second Asian Pacific American woman to serve as a federal district court judge.

Matsumoto presided over the Martin Shkreli securities fraud trial.

== See also ==
- List of Asian American jurists

Legal offices
Preceded by Edward R. Korman	Judge of the United States District Court for the Eastern District of New York; 2008–2022	Succeeded by Ramon Reyes
