= List of law clerks for the sixth seat of the Supreme Court of the United States =

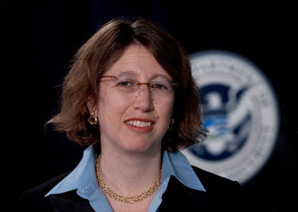
Margo Schlanger, a professor at the University of Michigan Law School, clerked for Justice Ruth Bader Ginsburg during the 1993–95 terms.

Law clerks have assisted the justices of the United States Supreme Court in various capacities since the first one was hired by Justice Horace Gray in 1882. Each justice is permitted to have between three and four law clerks per court term. Most persons serving in this capacity are recent law school graduates (and typically graduated at the top of their class). Among their many functions, clerks do legal research that assists justices in deciding what cases to accept and what questions to ask during oral arguments, prepare memoranda, and draft orders and opinions. After retiring from the court, a justice may continue to employ a law clerk, who may be assigned to provide additional assistance to an active justice or may assist the retired justice when sitting by designation with a lower court.

== Table of law clerks ==
The following is a table of law clerks serving the associate justice holding the sixth seat of the Supreme Court (the Court's sixth associate justice seat by order of creation), which was established on February 24, 1807, by the 9th Congress through the Seventh Circuit Act of 1807 (2 Stat. 420). This seat is currently occupied by Justice Amy Coney Barrett.

Seat 6 associate justices and law clerks

Stanley Matthews

May 17, 1881 –
March 22, 1889

Clerk	Started	Finished	School (year)	Previous clerkship
Everett Riley York	1886	1889	National (1885)	

David Josiah Brewer

January 6, 1890 –
March 28, 1910

Clerk	Started	Finished	School (year)	Previous clerkship
Frederick J. Haig	1893	1910	National (1896)	

Charles Evans Hughes

October 10, 1910 –
June 10, 1916

Clerk	Started	Finished	School (year)	Previous clerkship
Maurice M. Moore	1913	1914	GW (1913)	

John Hessin Clarke

October 9, 1916 –
September 18, 1922

Clerk	Started	Finished	School (year)	Previous clerkship
S. Edward Widdifield	1919	1922	Detroit (c. 1898)	J. Lamar / R. W. Peckham

George Sutherland

October 2, 1922 –
January 17, 1938

Clerk	Started	Finished	School (year)	Previous clerkship
S. Edward Widdifield	1922	1923	Detroit (c. 1898)	J. H. Clarke / J. Lamar / R. W. Peckham
Alan E. Gray	1924	1929	GW (1924)	
Francis Robison Kirkham	1930	1934	GW (1931)	
John Wiley Cragun	1934	1938	GW (1934)	

Stanley Forman Reed

January 31, 1938 –
February 25, 1957

Clerk	Started	Finished	School (year)	Previous clerkship
Harold Leventhal	1938	1938	Columbia (1936)	H. F. Stone
John Thomas Sapienza	1938	1939	Harvard (1937)	A. Hand (2d Cir.)
Philip L. Graham	1939	1940	Harvard (1939)	none
Bennett Boskey	1940	1941	Harvard (1939)	L. Hand (2d Cir.)
John H. Maclay, Jr.	1941	1942	Harvard (1940)	A. Hand (2d Cir.)
David Schwartz	1942	1943	Harvard (1939)	
Luther Earle Birdzell, Jr.	1943	1944	Harvard (1942)	A. Hand (2d Cir.)
Byron Edward Kabot	1944	1945	Chicago (1941)	
Emanuel G. Weiss	1945	1946	Harvard (1944)	C. Magruder (1st Cir.)
Frederick Aley Allan	1946	1947	Yale (1945)	L. Hand (2d Cir.)
Robert von Mehren	1947	1948	Harvard (1946)	L. Hand (2d Cir.)
John Brumback Spitzer	1947	1948	Yale (1947)	
Mac Asbill, Jr.	1948	1949	Harvard (1948)	
William W. Koontz	1948	1949	Virginia (1947)	
Joseph Barbash	1949	1950	Harvard (1948)	L. Hand (2d Cir.)
Bayless Manning	1949	1950	Yale (1949)	
Adam Yarmolinsky	1950	1951	Yale (1948)	C. E. Clark (2d Cir.)
Edwin M. Zimmerman	1950	1951	Columbia (1949)	Rifkind (S.D.N.Y.)
Lewis C. Green	1951	1952	Harvard (1950)	W. Orr (9th Cir.) / G. Moore (E.D. Mo.)
John D. Calhoun	1951	1952	Yale (1949)	
William D. Rogers	1952	1953	Yale (1951)	C. E. Clark (2d Cir.)
Robert L. Randall	1952	1954	Chicago (1951)	
John David Fassett	1953	1954	Yale (1953)	
George Brent Mickum, III	1953	1954	Georgetown (1952)	Fahy (D.C. Cir.)
Gordon B. Davidson	1954	1955	Louisville (LLB 1951) / Yale (LLM 1952)	
Joel A. Kozol	1954	1955	Harvard (1954)	
Julian Burke	1955	1956	Georgetown (1954)	Prettyman (D.C. Cir.)
Roderick M. Hills	1955	1957	Stanford (1955)	
Manley O. Hudson, Jr.	1956	1957	Harvard (1956)	
R. Markham Ball (shared with Burton and Warren)	1960	1961	Harvard (1960)	none
Timothy B. Dyk (shared with Burton)	1961	1962	Harvard (1961)	none
Theodore R. Boehm (shared with Burton and Warren)	1963	1964	Harvard (1963)	
George C. Cochran (shared with Warren)	1964	1965	North Carolina (1964)	none
Carl D. Lawson (shared with Warren)	1965	1966	Stanford (1963)	none
Harold Bolton Finn, III (shared with Warren)	1966	1967	Columbia (1966)	
Earl C. Dudley, Jr. (shared with Warren)	1968	1969	Virginia (1967)	none
Richard J. Urowsky (shared with Burger, Stewart, White)	1972	1973	Yale (1972)	none
David M. Becker	1974	1975	Columbia (1973)	Leventhal (D.C. Cir)
Christopher R. Lipsett	1975	1976	Penn (1974)	I. Goldberg (5th Cir.)

Charles Evans Whittaker

March 25, 1957 –
March 31, 1962

Clerk	Started	Finished	School (year)	Previous clerkship
Kenneth W. Dam	1957	1958	Chicago (1957)	none
Alan Charles Kohn	1957	1958	WashU (1955)	none
William C. Canby, Jr.	1958	1959	Minnesota (1956)	none
Heywood H. Davis	1958	1959	Kansas (1958)	none
Jerome B. Libin	1959	1960	Michigan (1959)	none
Patrick F. McCartan	1959	1960	Notre Dame (1959)	none
James Malone Edwards	1960	1961	Yale (1960)	none
D. Lawrence Gunnels	1960	1962	WashU (1960)	none
James N. Adler (shared with Warren)	1961	1962	Michigan (1961)	

Byron White

April 16, 1962 –
June 28, 1993

Clerk	Started	Finished	School (year)	Previous clerkship
D. Lawrence Gunnels (hired by Whittaker)	1962	1962	Wash U (1960)	none
Richard H. Stern	1962	1963	Yale (1959)	none
Ronald L. Blanc	1962	1963	NYU (1962)	none
Rex E. Lee	1963	1964	Chicago (1963)	none
Lee A. Albert	1963	1965	Yale (1963)	none
Dale S. Collinson	1964	1966	Columbia (1963)	Hays (2d Cir.)
David M. Ebel	1965	1966	Michigan (1965)	none
James B. Loken	1966	1967	Harvard (1965)	Lumbard (2d Cir.)
Raymond C. Clevenger III	1966	1967	Yale (1966)	none
Leon E. Irish	1967	1968	Michigan (1964)	none
Lance M. Liebman	1967	1968	Harvard (1967)	none
R. George Crawford	1968	1969	Harvard (1968)	none
David Victor	1968	1969	Virginia (1968)	none
W. John Glancy	1969	1970	Yale (1969)	none
E. Philip Soper	1969	1970	Harvard (1969)	none
George Marshall Moriarty (shared with Black, Stewart, Burger)	1969	1970	Harvard (1968)	Aldrich (1st Cir.)
Richard H. Sayler	1970	1971	Michigan (1969)	Lumbard (2d Cir.)
William E. Nelson	1970	1971	NYU (1965)	Weinfeld (S.D.N.Y.)
Allan A. Ryan, Jr.	1970	1971	Minnesota (1970)	none
David E. Kendall	1971	1972	Yale (1971)	none
Richard J. Danzig	1971	1972	Yale (1971)	none
James E. Scarboro	1971	1972	Colorado (1970)	Arraj (D. Colo.)
Rhesa Barksdale	1972	1973	Mississippi (1972)	none
Robert B. Barnett	1972	1973	Chicago (1971)	Wisdom (5th Cir.)
Richard L. Hoffman	1972	1973	Columbia (1971)	none
Richard J. Urowsky (hired by Reed, shared with Burger, Stewart)	1972	1973	Yale (1972)	none
Pierce H. O'Donnell	1973	1974	Georgetown (1972)	Hufstedler (9th Cir.)
Hal S. Scott	1973	1974	Chicago (1972)	Leventhal (D.C. Cir.)
Jonathan D. Varat	1973	1974	Penn (1972)	Mansfield (2d Cir.)
James T. Malysiak	1974	1975	Yale (1973)	Renfrew (N.D. Cal.)
John W. Nields Jr.	1974	1977	Penn (1967)	none
Larry L. Simms	1974	1975	Boston University (1973)	Oakes (2d Cir.)
Dennis J. Hutchinson	1975	1976	Texas (1974)	Tuttle (5th Cir.)
Robert L. Deitz (hired by Douglas / shared with Stewart)	1975	1976	Harvard (1975)	none
Randall C. Nelson	1975	1976	Colorado (1974)	R. Robb (D.C. Cir.)
Gilbert L. Kujovich (shared with Stewart)	1976	1977	Harvard (1975)	Hufstedler (9th Cir.)
John W. Spiegel	1976	1977	Yale (1976)	none
Robert W. Loewen	1976	1977	USC (1975)	Ely (9th Cir.)
S. Elizabeth Gibson	1977	1978	North Carolina (1976)	Craven (4th Cir.)
Thomas J. Campbell	1977	1978	Harvard (1976)	MacKinnon (D.C. Cir.)
Charles G. Cole	1977	1978	Harvard (1976)	Leventhal (D.C. Cir.)
Jeffrey Glekel	1977	1978	Yale (1972)	Weinfeld (S.D.N.Y.)
Kate Stith	1978	1979	Harvard (1977)	McGowan (D.C. Cir.)
David J. Burman	1978	1979	Georgetown (1977)	S. Robinson (D.C. Cir.)
Gary L. Sasso	1978	1979	Penn (1977)	S. Robinson (D.C. Cir.)
Nicholas J. Spaeth	1978	1979	Stanford (1977)	Bright (8th Cir.)
Benna R. Solomon	1979	1980	Georgia (1978)	Oakes (2d Cir.)
Robert V. Percival	1979	1980	Stanford (1978)	Hufstedler (9th Cir.)
Peter J. Kalis	1979	1980	Yale (1978)	J. S. Wright (D.C. Cir.)
Geoffrey P. Miller	1979	1980	Columbia (1978)	McGowan (D.C. Cir.)
Allan Ides	1980	1981	Loyola (Los Angeles) (1979)	Haynsworth (4th Cir.)
Paul W. Kahn	1980	1982	Yale (1980)	none
Thomas B. Metzloff	1980	1981	Harvard (1979)	Ainsworth (5th Cir.)
Andrea L. Peterson	1980	1981	Berkeley (1978)	Renfrew (N.D. Cal.)
Stuart H. Singer	1981	1983	Harvard (1981)	none
Ellen P. Aprill	1981	1982	Georgetown (1980)	Butzner (4th Cir.)
Bernard W. Bell	1982	1983	Stanford (1981)	Kearse (2d Cir.)
William T. Dzurilla	1982	1983	Tulane (1981)	Tate (5th Cir.)
Patricia A. Dean	1982	1983	Georgetown (1981)	Tamm (D.C. Cir.)
Kingsley R. Browne	1983	1984	Denver (1982)	Rovira (Colo.)
Richard I. Werder Jr.	1983	1984	Michigan (1982)	H. Edwards (D.C. Cir.)
Kevin J. Worthen	1983	1984	BYU (1982)	Wilkey (D.C. Cir.)
Michael E. Herz	1983	1985	Chicago (1982)	L. Campbell (1st Cir.)
Dean M. Gloster	1984	1985	UCLA (1983)	A. Kennedy (9th Cir.)
Scott L. Nelson	1984	1986	Harvard (1984)	none
Natalie Wexler	1984	1985	Penn (1983)	Rubin (5th Cir.)
Palma Joy Strand	1985	1986	Stanford (1984)	J. S. Wright (D.C. Cir.)
Andrew G. Schultz	1985	1986	New Mexico (1984)	Rubin (5th Cir.)
Samuel J. Dimon	1985	1987	Michigan (1985)	none
David W. Burcham	1986	1987	Loyola (Los Angeles) (1984)	Aldisert (3d Cir.)
Richard A. Westfall	1986	1987	Denver (1985)	McWilliams (10th Cir.)
Barbara Bea McDowell (Hartman)	1986	1988	Yale (1985)	R. Winter (2d Cir.)
Albert J. Boro, Jr.	1987	1988	Berkeley (1986)	W. Cummings (7th Cir.)
Richard A. Cordray	1987	1988	Chicago (1986)	Bork (D.C. Cir.)
Ronald A. Klain	1987	1989	Harvard (1987)	none
Paul R.Q. Wolfson	1987	1988	Yale (1987)	none
Stephen A. Higginson	1988	1989	Yale (1987)	Wald (D.C. Cir.)
Christopher R. Drahozal	1988	1989	Iowa (1986)	C. Clark (5th Cir.)
Laura Ariane ("Laurie") Miller	1988	1989	Yale (1988)	
Jonathan C. Bunge	1989	1990	Chicago (1988)	Buckley (D.C. Cir.)
Stephen R. McAllister	1989	1991	Kansas (1988)	Posner (7th Cir.)
Curtis A. Bradley	1990	1991	Harvard (1988)	Ebel (10th Cir.)
Kathryn Webb Bradley	1990	1991	Maryland (1988)	Smalkin (D. Md.)
Martin S. Flaherty	1990	1991	Columbia (1988)	J. J. Gibbons (3d Cir.)
Charles R. Eskridge, III	1991	1992	Pepperdine (1990)	C. Clark (5th Cir.)
David C. Frederick	1991	1992	Texas (1989)	Sneed (9th Cir.)
Stephen R. McAllister (shared with Thomas)	1991	1992	Kansas (1988)	B. White (twice) / Posner (7th Cir.)
Susan A. Weber	1991	1992	SUNY Buffalo (1989)	Sprouse (4th Cir.)
Robert Malley	1991	1992	Harvard (1990)	none
Jeffrey F. Pryce	1991	1993	Yale (1991)	none
John C.P. Goldberg	1992	1993	NYU (1991)	Weinstein (E.D.N.Y.)
David D. Meyer	1992	1993	Michigan (1990)	H. Edwards (D.C. Cir.)
Neil M. Gorsuch (shared with Kennedy)	1993	1994	Harvard (1991)	Sentelle (D.C. Cir.)
Stuart F. Delery (shared with O'Connor)	1994	1995	Yale (1993)	Tjoflat (11th Cir.)
Phil Weiser (shared with Ginsburg)	1995	1996	NYU (1994)	Ebel (10th Cir.)
John L. Flynn (shared with Stevens)	1996	1997	Georgetown (1995)	Becker (3d Cir.)
Benjamin A. Powell (shared with Stevens)	1997	1998	Columbia (1996)	J. M. Walker (2d Cir.)
J. Brett Busby (shared with Stevens)	1999	2000	Columbia (1998)	Tjoflat (11th Cir.)
Joseph T. Thai (shared with Stevens)	2000	2001	Harvard (1998)	Ebel (10th Cir.)

Ruth Bader Ginsburg

August 10, 1993 –
September 18, 2020

Clerk	Started	Finished	School (year)	Previous clerkship
Hugh W. Baxter	1993	1994	Stanford (1990)	Brennan / Blackmun / R. B. Ginsburg (D.C. Cir.)
David G. Post	1993	1994	Georgetown (1986)	R. B. Ginsburg (D.C. Cir.)
Margo Schlanger (Bagenstos)	1993	1995	Yale (1993)	none
Alexandra Anastasia Ekaterina Shapiro (Bach)	1993	1994	Columbia (1991)	S. Williams (D.C. Cir.)
Alisa Beth Klein (Goldblatt)	1994	1995	Harvard (1993)	L. Pollak (E.D. Pa.)
David M. Schizer	1994	1995	Yale (1993)	Kozinski (9th Cir.)
David B. Toscano	1994	1995	Columbia (1992)	Mukasey (S.D.N.Y.) / Conboy (S.D.N.Y.)
Lisa C. Beattie (Frelinghuysen)	1995	1996	Stanford (1994)	H. Edwards (D.C. Cir.)
Maria Simon	1995	1996	Columbia (1994)	Tatel (D.C. Cir.) / Mikva (D.C. Cir.)
Michael Li-Ming Wong	1995	1996	Harvard (1994)	Cabranes (2d Cir.)
Paul J. Watford	1995	1996	UCLA (1994)	Kozinski (9th Cir.)
Phil Weiser (shared with White)	1995	1996	NYU (1994)	Ebel (10th Cir.)
Laura W. Brill	1996	1997	Columbia (1994)	Feinberg (2d Cir.)
David C. Codell	1996	1997	Harvard (1995)	Tatel (D.C. Cir.)
W. William Hodes	1996	1997	Rutgers (1969)	N/A
M. Elizabeth Magill	1996	1997	Virginia (1995)	Wilkinson (4th Cir.)
Samuel Bagenstos	1997	1998	Harvard (1993)	Reinhardt (9th Cir.)
Paul Schiff Berman	1997	1998	NYU (1995)	H. Edwards (D.C. Cir.)
Gillian E. Metzger	1997	1998	Columbia (1995)	Wald (D.C. Cir.)
John B. Owens	1997	1998	Stanford (1996)	J. C. Wallace (9th Cir.)
Alexandra Harding Tileston ("Lexa") Edsall (Victor)	1998	1999	Harvard (1994)	Wald (D.C. Cir.)
Rochelle Lee Shoretz	1998	1999	Columbia (1994)	Kearse (2d Cir.)
William D. Savitt	1998	1999	Columbia (1997)	Leval (2d Cir.)
Jay D. Wexler	1998	1999	Stanford (1997)	Tatel (D.C. Cir.)
David L. Franklin	1999	2000	Chicago (1997)	S. Williams (D.C. Cir.)
Richard A. Primus	1999	2000	Yale (1998)	Calabresi (2d Cir.)
Amanda L. Tyler	1999	2000	Harvard (1998)	Calabresi (2d Cir.)
Deirdre Dionysia von Dornum	1999	2000	Columbia (1997)	Brody (E.D. Pa.) / Reinhardt (9th Cir.)
Nick Bravin	2000	2001	Columbia (1998)	Ebel (10th Cir.)
Robert M. Gordon	2000	2001	Yale (1998)	Leval (2d Cir.)
Goodwin Liu	2000	2001	Yale (1998)	Tatel (D.C. Cir.)
Linda C. Lye	2000	2001	Berkeley (1999)	Calabresi (2d Cir.)
Heather Elliott (Rachels)	2001	2002	Berkeley (2000)	Garland (D.C. Cir.)
David A. O'Neil	2001	2002	Harvard (2000)	Sack (2d Cir.)
Joseph R. Palmore	2001	2002	Virginia (1998)	Jacobs (2d Cir.) / Gleeson (E.D.N.Y.)
Aaron J. Saiger	2001	2002	Columbia (2000)	D. Ginsburg (D.C. Cir.)
Toby J. Heytens	2002	2003	Virginia (2000)	Becker (3d Cir.)
Trevor Morrison	2002	2003	Columbia (1998)	B. Fletcher (9th Cir.)
Elizabeth G. Porter	2002	2003	Columbia (2000)	S. Thomas (9th Cir.)
Karl R. Thompson	2002	2003	Chicago (2000)	Tatel (D.C. Cir.)
Abbe R. Gluck	2003	2004	Yale (2000)	R. Winter (2d Cir.)
Aziz Huq	2003	2004	Columbia (2001)	Sack (2d Cir.)
Anne Joseph O'Connell	2003	2004	Yale (2000)	S. Williams (D.C. Cir.)
Neil S. Siegel	2003	2004	Berkeley (2001)	Wilkinson (4th Cir.)
Ginger D. Anders	2004	2005	Columbia (2002)	Sotomayor (2d Cir.) / G. Lynch (S.D.N.Y.)
Katherine H. Ku	2004	2005	UCLA (2003)	Kozinski (9th Cir.)
Daniel B. Levin	2004	2005	Yale (2002)	W. Fletcher (9th Cir.)
Dorothy H. Tran	2004	2005	Harvard (2003)	Tatel (D.C. Cir.)
Lori Alvino (McGill)	2005	2006	Columbia (2003)	D. Ginsburg (D.C. Cir.)
Joshua Ian Civin	2005	2006	Yale (2003)	Reinhardt (9th Cir.)
Rebecca G. Deutsch	2005	2006	Yale (2002)	Katzmann (2d Cir.) / Rakoff (S.D.N.Y.)
Anna-Rose Mathieson	2005	2006	Michigan (2003)	Boudin (1st Cir.)
Kate Andrias	2006	2007	Yale (2004)	Reinhardt (9th Cir.)
Scott Hershovitz	2006	2007	Yale (2004)	W. Fletcher (9th Cir.)
Daphna Renan	2006	2007	Yale (2004)	H. Edwards (D.C. Cir.)
Arun Subramanian	2006	2007	Columbia (2004)	Jacobs (2d Cir.) / G. Lynch (S.D.N.Y.)
Ruthanne M. Deutsch	2007	2008	Georgetown (2004)	Dyk (Fed. Cir.)
Brian Fletcher	2007	2008	Harvard (2006)	Garland (D.C. Cir.)
Thomas G. Saunders	2007	2008	Yale (2004)	Leval (2d Cir.)
Zachary D. Tripp	2007	2008	Columbia (2005)	Kearse (2d Cir.)
Sue-Yun Ahn (Kitcher)	2008	2009	Columbia (2006)	Tatel (D.C. Cir.) / Cote (S.D.N.Y.)
Miriam L. Seifter (Yablon)	2008	2009	Harvard (2007)	Garland (D.C. Cir.)
Kevin S. Schwartz	2008	2009	Yale (2006)	Calabresi (2d Cir.)
Robert M. Yablon	2008	2009	Yale (2006)	W. Fletcher (9th Cir.)
Isaac J. Lidsky (shared with O'Connor)	2008	2009	Harvard (2004)	Ambro (3d Cir.)
Elizabeth Prelogar	2009	2010	Harvard (2008)	Garland (D.C. Cir.)
Pamela Karten Bookman (Perlman)	2009	2010	Virginia (2006)	Sack (2d Cir.)
Vincent G. Levy	2009	2010	Columbia (2007)	D. Ginsburg (D.C. Cir.)
John Rappaport	2009	2010	Harvard (2006)	Reinhardt (9th Cir.)
Amy L. Bergquist	2010	2011	Minnesota (2007)	W. Fletcher (9th Cir.) / Tunheim (D. Minn)
David A. Newman	2010	2011	Yale (2006)	Katzmann (2d Cir.) / Rakoff (S.D.N.Y.)
Elisabeth S. Theodore	2010	2011	Harvard (2009)	Garland (D.C. Cir.)
Keith Bradley	2010	2011	Columbia (2007)	J.R. Brown (D.C. Cir.)
Rachel Wainer Apter	2011	2012	Harvard (2007)	Katzmann (2d Cir.) / Rakoff (S.D.N.Y.)
Benjamin Beaton	2011	2012	Columbia (2009)	Randolph (D.C. Cir.)
Jennifer J. Clark	2011	2012	Georgetown (2008)	Tatel (D.C. Cir.)
Gerard J. ("Gerry") Sinzdak	2011	2012	Berkeley (2008)	Berzon (9th Cir.) / C. Breyer (N.D. Cal.)
Matthew J. Tokson (shared with Souter)	2011	2012	Chicago (2008)	Randolph (D.C. Cir.)
Martine E. Cicconi	2012	2013	Stanford (2010)	Garland (D.C. Cir.)
Joshua S. Johnson	2012	2013	Yale (2009)	Tatel (D.C. Cir.) / Gertner (D. Mass.)
Julia Kobick	2012	2013	Harvard (2010)	Chagares (3d Cir.) / Saylor (D. Mass.)
Nathan M. ("Thane") Rehn	2012	2013	Columbia (2009)	Posner (7th Cir.)
Kelsi Brown Corkran	2013	2014	Chicago (2005)	Tatel (D.C. Cir.)
Devi M. Rao	2013	2014	Columbia (2010)	McKeown (9th Cir.)
Daniel A. Rubens	2013	2014	Harvard (2008)	Katzmann (2d Cir.) / Rakoff (S.D.N.Y.)
Burden H. Walker	2013	2014	Harvard (2010)	S. Williams (D.C. Cir.)
Ryan Y. Park (shared with Souter)	2013	2014	Harvard (2010)	Katzmann (2d Cir.) / Rakoff (S.D.N.Y.)
Ari Holtzblatt	2014	2015	Yale (2010)	Tatel (D.C. Cir.)
Mark Paul Musico	2014	2015	Columbia (2011)	Boudin (1st Cir.) / Woodlock (D. Mass.)
Lauren Pardee (Ruben)	2014	2015	Yale (2010)	Katzmann (2d Cir.) / Rakoff (S.D.N.Y.) / Liu (Cal.)
Anitha Reddy	2014	2015	Stanford (2008)	Leval (2d Cir.) / Gleeson (E.D.N.Y.)
Eli Savit (shared with O'Connor)	2014	2015	Michigan (2010)	Tatel (D.C. Cir. / Bea (9th Cir.)
Z. Payvand Ahdout	2015	2016	Columbia (2013)	Livingston (2d Cir.)
Joshua Bone	2015	2016	Yale (2013)	Tatel (D.C. Cir.)
Samuel T. Harbourt	2015	2016	Harvard (2013)	Garland (D.C. Cir.)
Amy L. Marshak	2015	2016	NYU (2011)	Katzmann (2d Cir.) / Rakoff (S.D.N.Y.)
Subash S. Iyer	2016	2017	NYU (2013)	Rakoff (S.D.N.Y.) / Katzmann (2d Cir.)
Hajin Kim	2016	2017	Stanford (2014)	Watford (9th Cir.)
Beth C. Neitzel	2016	2017	Stanford (2013)	D. Motz (4th Cir.) / Tatel (D.C. Cir.)
Parker A. Rider-Longmaid	2016	2017	Penn (2013)	Scirica (3d Cir.) / Pratter (E.D. Pa.)
Beatrice C. Franklin (Mead)	2017	2018	Columbia (2014)	Furman (S.D.N.Y.) / Carney (2d Cir.)
Karim J. Kentfield	2017	2018	Berkeley (2012)	W. Fletcher (9th Cir.) / Srinivasan (D.C. Cir.)
Mary H. Schnoor	2017	2018	Harvard (2016)	Posner (7th Cir.)
Emma P. Simson	2017	2018	Yale (2013)	Boasberg (D.D.C.) / Tatel (D.C. Cir.)
Adam Liron Goodman (shared with Souter)	2017	2018	Harvard (2013)	Rakoff (S.D.N.Y.) / Katzmann (2d Cir.)
Kathryn ("Katie") Barber	2018	2019	Virginia (2015)	Brinkema (E.D. Va.) / Owens (9th Cir.)
Rachel Bayefsky	2018	2019	Yale (2015)	Rakoff (S.D.N.Y.) / Katzmann (2d Cir.)
Rebecca Lee	2018	2019	Yale (2016)	Wilkinson (4th Cir.) / Moss (D.D.C.)
Matthew Jacob Rubenstein	2018	2019	Yale (2014)	Gwin (N.D. Oh.) / Tatel (D.C. Cir.)
Samuel Conrad Scott (hired by Kennedy)	2018	2019	Yale (2015)	Watford (9th Cir.) / Garaufis (E.D.N.Y.)
Alyssa Marie Barnard	2019	2020	Columbia (2015)	Katzmann (2d Cir.) / Nathan (S.D.N.Y.)
Marco P. Basile	2019	2020	Harvard (2015)	Watford (9th Cir.) / Barron (1st Cir.)
Susan M. Pelletier	2019	2020	Harvard (2016)	Garland (D.C. Cir.) / H. Edwards (D.C. Cir.)
Michael Frank Qian	2019	2020	Stanford (2016)	Garland (D.C. Cir.)
Mark Jia (shared with Souter)	2019	2020	Harvard (2016)	W. Fletcher (9th Cir.)
Jack Boeglin	2020	September 18, 2020	Yale (2016)	Calabresi (2d Cir.) / Srinivasan (D.C. Cir.)
Brittany Jones-Record	2020	September 18, 2020	Stanford (2016)	Sutton (6th Cir.) / Millett (D.C. Cir.)
Eliza A. Lehner	2020	September 18, 2020	Yale (2017)	Watford (9th Cir.) / Furman (S.D.N.Y.)
David Scott Louk	2020	September 18, 2020	Yale (2015)	Boasberg (D.D.C.) / Katzmann (2d Cir.)
Thaddeus C. Eagles (hired by Stevens)	2020	September 18, 2020	NYU (2015)	Rakoff (S.D.N.Y.) / Katzmann (2d Cir.)

Amy Coney Barrett

October 27, 2020 –
Incumbent

Clerk	Started	Finished	School (year)	Previous clerkship
Brendan D. Duffy	October 27, 2020	2021	Northwestern (2017)	Barrett (7th Cir.) / Kelly (10th Cir.)
Nicholas ("Nick") Harper	October 27, 2020	2021	Chicago (2015)	Kennedy / Kavanaugh (D.C. Cir.)
Whitney Downs Hermandorfer	October 27, 2020	2021	GW (2015)	Alito / Kavanaugh (D.C. Cir.) / Leon (D.D.C.)
Madeline Ward Lansky (Clark)	October 27, 2020	2021	Chicago (2016)	Thomas / W. Pryor (11th Cir.)
Michael Tyler Heckmann	2021	2022	Chicago (2016)	Barrett (7th Cir.) / Marcus (11th Cir.)
Libby Andrea Stropko (Baird)	2021	2022	Virginia (2019)	McFadden (D.D.C.) / Newsom (11th Cir.)
Max E. Schulman	2021	2022	Harvard (2017)	Katsas (D.C. Cir.) / Stein (S.D.N.Y.)
Zachary E. Tyree	2021	2022	GW (2017)	Larsen (6th Cir.) / Sutton (6th Cir.)
Elizabeth Nielson (shared with Kennedy)	2021	2022	Chicago (2019)	Lee (Utah) / Sutton (6th Cir.)
Giuliana Carozza Cipollone	2022	2023	Stanford (2021)	Bress (9th Cir.)
Henry J. Dickman	2022	2023	Virginia (2020)	Katsas (D.C. Cir.) / Sykes (7th Cir.)
Daniel P. Johnson	2022	2023	Harvard (2019)	Richardson (4th Cir.) / Silberman (D.C. Cir.)
Tim Bradley	2022	2023	Notre Dame (2020)	Colloton (8th Cir.) / Sutton (6th Cir.)
Julia Fine	2023	2024	Stanford (2020)	Bibas (3d Cir.) / Friedrich (D.D.C.)
Matthew Pociask	2023	2024	Chicago (2020)	Thapar (6th Cir.) / Katsas (D.C. Cir.)
Nathaniel Sutton	2023	2024	Virginia (2021)	Bress (9th Cir.) / Pryor (11th Cir.)
Connor Mui	2023	2024	Yale (2021)	Newsom (11th Cir.) / Wilkinson (4th Cir.)
John Acton	2024	2025	Harvard (2022)	Grant (11th Cir.) / Katsas (D.C. Cir.)
Max Bloom	2024	2025	Harvard (2021)	Wilkinson (4th Cir.) / Rao (D.C. Cir.)
Kari Lorentson	2024	2025	Notre Dame (2019)	Pappert (E.D. Pa.) / Barrett (7th Cir.) / Scudder (7th Cir.)
Elizabeth (Totzke) Van Austen	2024	2025	Notre Dame (2022)	Sykes (7th Cir.) / Stras (8th Cir.)
Elizabeth M. Fritz	2025	2026	Virginia (2022)	Bress (9th Cir.) / Sutton (6th Cir.)
Olivia Goldberg	2025	2026	Stanford (2022)	Bibas (3d Cir.) / Subramanian (S.D.N.Y.)
Kate Hardiman Rhodes	2025	2026	Georgetown (2022)	McFadden (D.D.C.) / Katsas (D.C. Cir.)
Matthew H. Phillips	2025	2026	Chicago (2023)	Richardson (4th Cir.) / Rao (D.C. Cir.)
Rohit Asirvatham	2026		Duke (2021)	Stras (8th Cir.) / Nichols (D.D.C.)
John R. Czubek	2026		Harvard (2024)	Grant (11th Cir.) / Kovner (E.D.N.Y.)
Brock Mason	2026		BYU (2022)	Sutton (6th Cir.) / Menashi (2d Cir.)
Olivia Rogers	2026		Notre Dame (2023)	Newsom (11th Cir.) / Stras (8th Cir.)
Jack Ferguson	2027		Notre Dame (2024)	Nalbandian (6th Cir.) / Rao (D.C. Cir)
Karl Kaellenius	2027		Stanford (2023)	Newsom (11th Cir.) / McFadden (D.D.C.)

== Additional sources ==
- Baier, Paul R. (1973). "The Law Clerks: Profile of an Institution," Vanderbilt L. Rev. 26: 1125–77.
- Boskey, Bennett, "Justice Reed and His Family of Law Clerks," 69 Ky. L. J. 869 (1980–81).
- "Georgia Law Alumni Who Have Clerked for a U.S. Supreme Court Justice," Advocate, Spring/Summer 2004 (listing 6 names).
- Judicial Clerkship Handbook, USC Gould Law School, 2013–2014, p. 33, Appendix B.
- Newland, Charles A. (June 1961). "Personal Assistants to the Supreme Court Justices: The Law Clerks," Oregon L. Rev. 40: 306–07.
- News of Supreme Court clerks. University of Virginia Law School, list of clerks, 2004–2018.
- University of Michigan clerks to the Supreme Court, 1991-2017, University of Michigan Law School Web site (2016). Retrieved September 20, 2016.
- Ward, Artemus and David L. Weiden (2006). Sorcerers' Apprentices: 100 Years of Law Clerks at the United States Supreme Court. New York, NY: New York University Press. ISBN 978-0-8147-9420-3, ISBN 978-0-8147-9420-3.
