= John Rappaport =

American legal scholar

- Born: John Michael Rappaport; July 1, 1980 (age 46)
- Education: Stanford University (BS); Harvard University (JD)
- Employer: University of Chicago Law School
- Known for: Criminal procedure, evidence law

John Rappaport (born July 1, 1980) is an American legal scholar who is currently a professor of law and the Ludwig and Hilde Wolf Research Scholar at the University of Chicago Law School. He is an expert on criminal procedure and evidence law.

== Education and career ==
Rappaport graduated from Stanford University with a Bachelor of Science in mathematics with distinction in 2002. In 2006, he graduated with a Juris Doctor, magna cum laude, from Harvard Law School.

After graduating from law school, Rappaport worked as a law clerk for Judge Stephen Reinhardt on the United States Court of Appeals for the Ninth Circuit. In 2004, he was a Legal Intern for the United States Department of Justice Civil Rights Division, Educational Opportunities Section and a Legal Intern for the ACLU of Michigan. In 2005, he was a Legal Intern for the ACLU of New York. From 2007 to 2010, he worked in the Office of the Federal Public Defender in Los Angeles, California. From 2009 to 2010, he worked as a law clerk for Justice Ruth Bader Ginsburg on the Supreme Court of the United States. Between 2010 and 2012, he worked as a litigation associate at Munger, Tolles & Olson in Los Angeles. After this role, he worked as a law clerk for Judge Paul J. Watford for six months.

In 2015, Rappaport joined the University of Chicago Law School faculty as an assistant professor, having served as a Harry A. Bigelow Teaching Fellow and a lecturer between 2013 and 2015. He became a tenured professor in 2020. His teaching and research interests include criminal procedure and the criminal justice system, with a focus on police misconduct and evidence.

== Selected publications ==
- Some Doubts About "Democratizing" Criminal Justice (2020).
- Criminal Law and the American Penal System (with Andrew Manuel Crespo) (2022).

== See also ==
- List of law clerks for the sixth seat of the Supreme Court of the United States
