= List of Slovak Americans =

This is a list of notable Slovak Americans, including both original immigrants who obtained American citizenship and their American descendants.

To be included in this list, the person must have a Wikipedia article showing they are Slovak American or must have references showing they are Slovak American and are notable. Some of this list might have Slovak immigrant ancestors of German, Hungarian, or Romani descent.

== List ==
=== Arts, culture, and entertainment ===
- Jon Bon Jovi – rock musician, singer-songwriter and actor (paternal grandmother of Slovak descent)
- David Boreanaz – actor (mother was half Slovak descent)
- Dove Cameron – singer, actress
- Jim Caviezel – film actor (paternal grandmother of Slovak descent)
- Scarlett Chorvat – film and television actress
- Alexandra Daddario – actress
- Matthew Daddario – actor
- Laco Déczi (Ladislav Déči) – jazz trumpeter and composer, leader of Jazz Celula New York
- Steve Ditko – comic book artist and writer, co-creator of the Marvel Comics heroes Spider-Man and Doctor Strange
- David Dobrik – YouTuber
- Jackie Evancho – singer
- Five for Fighting (Vladimir John Ondrasik III) – singer-songwriter
- Moritz Fuerst – artist employed with United States Mint in the 19th century
- Gene Greytak – real estate broker who made a career as an actor by impersonating Pope John Paul II
- Dave Grohl – rock musician, multi-instrumentalist, singer-songwriter, and film director, of part Slovak descent
- James Haven – actor and producer
- Alois Havrilla – radio announcer and singer
- Ema Horvath – actress
- Steve Ihnat – actor, director
- Justin Jedlica – "human Ken doll"
- Angelina Jolie – actress, former fashion model and Goodwill Ambassador for the UN Refugee Agency; daughter of Jon Voight (paternal grandfather of Slovak descent)
- Bianca Kajlich – actress, her father, Dr. Aurel Jan "Relo" Kajlich, was a Slovak immigrant
- Candace Kroslak – actress
- Austin Mahone – singer-songwriter
- Adéla Jergová - singer-songwriter, dancer
- Victor S. Mamatey – professor of history, active in Slovak immigrant organizations in the United States
- Luba Mason – singer-songwriter, actress, dancer
- MatPat – YouTuber, internet personality
- Brittany Murphy – actress
- Pola Negri – actress, her father, Juraj Chalupec, was a Slovak immigrant
- Paul Newman – actor and film director (his mother was Slovak)
- Benjamin Orr, musician (Rusyn mother from present day Kojšov, Slovakia and Ukrainian father)
- Anne Pitoniak – actress
- Kiernan Shipka – actress
- Emil Sitka – actor, parents were Slovak immigrants
- Allisyn Snyder – actress
- Sara Tomko – actress
- Robert Urich – actor
- Katarina Van Derham – model, actress, and publisher
- Jon Voight – actor (paternal grandfather was a Slovak immigrant from Košice; paternal grandmother was also of Slovak descent)
- Andy Warhol – (Andrew Warhola) pop-art painter, both parents were Rusins from Slovak part of Czechoslovakia
- Doc Williams – country music bandleader and vocalist

=== Business ===
- John Dopyera – inventor, entrepreneur
- John D. Hertz – businessman, thoroughbred racehorse owner and breeder, and philanthropist, one of the earliest owners of The Hertz Corporation (born in small village in central Slovakia)
- iJustine – blogger
- Travis Kalanick – founder of Uber (paternal grandfather was a Slovak immigrant from Valaškovce)
- Frank Lowy – owner and manager of Westfield-branded shopping centers
- Anna Olson – restaurant owner
- John Bugas – second in command at Ford Motor Company during the presidency and chairmanship reign of Henry Ford II

=== Law and politics ===
- Michael Badnarik – software engineer, political figure, and radio talk show host
- Mark Critz – U.S. Congressman
- William T. Dzurilla – international attorney and law clerk to Justice Byron White of the United States Supreme Court
- Carolyn Forché – professor, poet, editor, and human rights advocate
- John Mica – Republican former member of the U.S. House of Representatives from Florida
- Joseph M. Gaydos – Democratic member of the U.S. House of Representatives from Pennsylvania
- Peter P. Jurchak – legal counsel for the United Mine Workers
- John Katko – U.S. Representative from New York
- Vincent Obsitnik – diplomat born in Slovakia, former Ambassador of the United States of America to Slovakia
- Tom Ridge – Republican, 43rd Governor of Pennsylvania and 1st Secretary of United States Department of Homeland Security
- John Roberts – Chief Justice of the United States
- Philip Ruppe – U.S. Representative
- Claudine Schneider – U.S. Representative from Rhode Island
- Joe Sestak – U.S. Representative, Democrat, Pennsylvania 7th District; retired US Naval vice-admiral; democratic presidential candidate in 2020 election
- Steve Sisolak – 30th governor of Nevada
- John Slezak – U.S. Under Secretary of the Army from 1954 to 1955
- Judy Baar Topinka – Republican politician in Illinois
- Jesse Ventura – 38th Governor of Minnesota, wrestler, television personality
- Pete Visclosky – U.S. Representative for Indiana's 1st congressional district
- Ann M. Yastishock – American diplomat who is serving as the United States ambassador to Papua New Guinea, along with the Solomon Islands and Vanuatu.
- Jozef Lettrich – writer and politician
- Nick Wasicsko – American politician from New York and the youngest-ever mayor of Yonkers, New York.

=== Military ===
- Štefan Banič – constructor of a parachute-like device which he donated to the US Army, but was not used
- Joseph E. Durik – Seaman Apprentice of United States Naval Reserve
- Matej Kocak – Sergeant of the United States Marine Corps; double Medal of Honor recipient in World War I
- Richard Marcinko – U.S. Navy SEAL and founder of SEAL Team 6
- Michael Strank – Sergeant of the United States Marine Corps, one of the six flag-raisers who helped raise the second U.S. flag atop Mount Suribachi on February 23, 1945
- John J. Yeosock – United States Army lieutenant general, commander the Third United States Army during Operation Desert Shield and Operation Desert Storm.

=== Religion ===
- Joseph Victor Adamec – bishop of the Roman Catholic Diocese of Altoona–Johnstown
- David A. Bednar – member of the Quorum of the Twelve Apostles, The Church of Jesus Christ of Latter-day Saints (LDS Church)
- Teresa Demjanovich – Roman Catholic nun
- John Hardon – priest, author, theologian, community leader
- Michael Novak – American Catholic philosopher, journalist, novelist, and diplomat
- Jaroslav Pelikan – scholar of the history of Christianity, Christian theology and medieval intellectual history
- David Allen Zubik – twelfth and current bishop of Roman Catholic Diocese of Pittsburgh, Pennsylvania

=== Science and medicine ===
- Ruzena Bajcsy – engineer and computer scientist specializing in robotics, director emerita of CITRIS (the Center for Information Technology Research in the Interest of Society)
- Gene Cernan – NASA astronaut, naval aviator, electrical engineer, aeronautical engineer, and fighter pilot
- John Dopyera – inventor of the resonator acoustic guitar
- Mike Fincke – NASA astronaut, International Space Station commander
- Daniel Carleton Gajdusek – co-recipient of 1976 Nobel Prize in Physiology or Medicine for early work on kuru (his father was Slovak)
- Ivan Alexander Getting – electrical engineer, inventor of GPS
- Lars Krutak – anthropologist, writer, photographer, and curator
- Jozef Murgaš – inventor, architect, botanist, painter, US patriot, and Roman Catholic priest
- Douglas D. Osheroff – physicist
- Ján Vilček – biomedical scientist, educator, inventor and philanthropist; currently a professor in the Department of Microbiology at the New York University School of Medicine and President of the Vilcek Foundation
- Thomas David Jones – former United States astronaut, he works as a planetary scientist, space operations consultant, astronaut speaker, and author

=== Sports ===
- Joe Baksi – former professional boxer, heavyweight
- John Grimek – bodybuilder, never defeated in his entire professional career, the son of Slovak immigrants George and Maria Grimek, peasants from the village Ústie nad Oravou in northern Slovakia
- Chuck Bednarik – former professional American football player for the Philadelphia Eagles of the NFL
- George Blanda – former quarterback and kicker for the Oakland Raiders and Houston Oilers
- Jeff Bzdelik – basketball coach; currently an assistant with the Houston Rockets, former assistant with the Memphis Grizzlies, and former head coach of the Denver Nuggets, U.S. Air Force Academy, University of Colorado, and Wake Forest University
- Robbie Ftorek – former professional ice hockey player
- Bill Hartack – jockey
- Elle Hartje – ice hockey player
- Mike Holovak – football player, coach, and executive
- Al Hostak – former professional boxer, middleweight
- Scott Kazmir – MLB player
- Matthew Knies – ice hockey player
- Andy Kosco – former baseball player
- Jack Kralick – former pitcher for Washington Senators and Cleveland Indians
- Leslie Krichko – Olympic skier
- Johnny Kucab – pitcher for Philadelphia Athletics in 1940s and 1950s
- Kyle Kuric – professional basketball player in Spain, currently with Gran Canaria
- John Kundla – professional NBA coach, member of Naismith Memorial Basketball Hall of Fame. (His father Ján was Slovak immigrant)
- Joseph Lapchick – former basketball player and coach
- Pete Latzo – boxer
- Bethanie Mattek-Sands – professional tennis player
- Stan Mikita – former professional ice hockey player
- Stephen Nedoroscik — gymnast, 2024 Olympic medal winner
- Andy Pafko – baseball center fielder for the Chicago Cubs (1943–51), Brooklyn Dodgers (1951–52) and Milwaukee Braves (1953–59)
- Kelly Pavlik – undefeated WBO/World Boxing Council middleweight boxing champion
- Mike Piazza – professional baseball player
- Nicole Rajičová – figure skater
- George Shuba – former outfielder for the Brooklyn Dodgers
- Brian Sikorski – baseball relief pitcher
- Paul Stastny – professional ice hockey player
- Peter Šťastný – former professional ice hockey player
- Yan Stastny – professional ice hockey player
- Dean Talafous – former professional ice hockey player
- Brett Tomko – former MLB pitcher
- Scott Touzinsky – volleyball player
- Alex Tuch – professional ice hockey player
- Elmer Valo – right fielder, coach and scout in Major League Baseball
- Elmer Vasko – hockey legend for the Chicago Blackhawks, where he played for 10 seasons.

1961 Stanley Cup Winner

== See also ==
- List of Slovaks
- Slovak Americans
