= Martin Flaherty =

Martin Flaherty may refer to:

- Martin Flaherty (baseball)
- Martin S. Flaherty, legal scholar and international human rights activist
