= Simona Grossi =

Italian-American lawyer

- Born: 1979 (age 46–47); Calabria, Italy
- Education: Luiss University (JD); University of California, Berkeley (LLM, SJD)
- Occupations: Professor of Law, Theodore A. Bruinsma Fellow, Loyola Law School

Simona Grossi is an Italian-born lawyer, law professor, pianist, orchestra conductor, and fiction author. She currently serves as the Theodore A. Bruinsma Fellow and a professor of law at Loyola Law School in Los Angeles.

== Early life and education ==
Simona Grossi was born in 1979 in Calabria, Italy. She began studying piano at the age of 10 and later obtained her piano degree from the Conservatory of Frosinone in Italy in 2019. Grossi pursued her legal education, earning a Juris Doctor from L.U.I.S.S. University School of Law in Italy. She then furthered her studies in the United States, obtaining a Master of Laws in 2009 and a Doctor of Juridical Science in 2011 from the UC Berkeley School of Law.

== Career ==
Grossi is a practicing lawyer with expertise in civil procedure, constitutional law, and federal courts. Additionally, Grossi has served as a director of the American Journal of Comparative Law. Grossi is also known for her work as an orchestra conductor. She founded and conducts the Loyola Law School Orchestra in 2020.

== Selected publications ==
- Civil Procedure: Cases & Problems (with Allan Ides & Christopher N. May), Aspen 2022, 6th ed., forthcoming.
- Rethinking the Harmonization of Jurisdictional Rules (August 9, 2011). 86 Tulane Law Review 623 (2012), Loyola-LA Legal Studies Paper No. 2011-25
- "The Claim and the Relief: Revealing Missteps and Misconceptions in the U.S. Supreme Court’s Jurisprudence for §1983 Actions and Black Lives Matter." Columbia Journal of Race and Law (2022).
- Roe v. Wade Under Attack: Choosing Procedural Doctrines Over Fundamental Constitutional Rights, 13 ConLawNOW 39 (2022).
- Venezuela v. Helmerich: Will Formalism Win Over Substantive Law? Again?, 11 N.Y.U. Journal of Law & Liberty 1 (2017).
