= Bernard Bell (attorney) =

American law clerk

The George Washington University Law School, Dean's representative on the New Jersey Law Revision Commission
- Incumbent
- Assumed office 2017

Associate Dean for Academic Affairs at Rutgers School of Law–Newark
- Incumbent
- Assumed office 2019

Assistant U.S. Attorney for the Southern District of New York
- In office 1993–1994

Personal details
- Education: Harvard University (BA); Stanford University (JD)

Bernard Bell is the associate dean for academic affairs and faculty professor of law and Herbert Hannoch Scholar at Rutgers School of Law–Newark.

== Career ==
Bell received a B.A. cum laude from Harvard and a J.D. from Stanford, where he was notes editor of the Stanford Law Review and a member of the Order of the Coif. He clerked for Judge Amalya L. Kearse of the U.S. Court of Appeals for the Second Circuit and for U.S. Supreme Court Justice Byron R. White and then practiced with Sullivan & Cromwell in New York City. Before coming to Rutgers in 1994, he served as senior litigation counsel and, earlier, as Assistant U.S. Attorney (Civil Division) in the U.S. Attorney's Office for the Southern District of New York.

Bell has written numerous articles which have appeared in several journals, including the Stanford Law Review, the Texas Law Review, the North Carolina Law Review, the Ohio State Law Review, the George Washington Law Review, the Pittsburgh Law Review, the Federal Communications Law Journal, and the Journal of Law and Politics.

He has been an invited speaker at the Columbia Legal Theory Workshop, the University of Illinois Faculty Colloquium, and the Administrative and Regulatory Law Section of the American Bar Association, and has been a visiting professor at Columbia Law School and The George Washington University Law School. Bell currently serves as the Dean's representative on the New Jersey Law Revision Commission. He is a member of the Governing Council of the ABA Section on Administrative Law and Regulatory Practice, vice-chair of the section's Constitutional Law and Separation of Powers Committee, and a member of the section's Interstate Compact APA Project. He is also active in the Association of American Law Schools — he has recently served as chair of its Section on Defamation and Privacy Law and its Section on Legislation, and is currently chair-elect of the Section on Administrative Law.

== See also ==
- List of law clerks for the sixth seat of the Supreme Court of the United States
