= Dzurilla =

Dzurilla is a surname. Notable people with the surname include:

- Adam D'Zurilla (born 1981), American musician
- Vladimír Dzurilla (1942–1995), Slovak ice hockey player
- William T. Dzurilla (born 1953), American lawyer
