= Jennifer J. Clark =

American economic geographer

- Born: Jennifer Joy Clark (Note: Mentioned in the "Biographical Sketch" section of her doctoral dissertation); Boston, Massachusetts
- Known for: regional economic development, cities, industries and technological change
- Title: Knowlton School Distinguished Professor, and Head of the City and Regional Planning Section
- Awards: Best Book Award, Regional Studies Association (2009); The 2021 Urban Affairs Association Best Book Award; The 2022 Regional Studies Association Best Book Award

Academic background
- Education: PhD, City and Regional Planning, Cornell University, 2004; MPlan, Hubert H. Humphrey School of Public Affairs, University of Minnesota, 1999; BA, History, Wesleyan University, 1995
- Thesis: Restructuring the region : the evolution of the optics and imaging industry in Rochester, NY (2004)
- Doctoral advisor: Susan Christopherson
- Other advisors: Pierre Clavel; Katherine V. W. Stone; Matthew Drennan

Academic work
- Discipline: City and Regional Planning, Economic Geography, Public Policy
- Sub-discipline: Regional economic development, cities and technology
- Institutions: The Ohio State University; Georgia Institute of Technology
- Notable works: Uneven Innovation: The Work of Smart Cities; Working Regions: Reconnecting Innovation and Production in the Knowledge Economy; Remaking Regional Economies: Power, Labor, and Firm Strategies in the Knowledge Economy

Jennifer J. Clark is an American academic and author. Clark is a Knowlton School Distinguished Professor and Head of the City and Regional Planning Section, in the College of Engineering at Ohio State University. She is a Fellow of the American Association of Geographers, and a Fellow of the Regional Studies Association. Clark has provided expert testimony before the US Congress and policy advice and consulting to the OECD, the Canadian, UK, and US governments and serving on nongovernmental policy commissions and committees.

== Early life and education ==
Clark was born in Boston, Massachusetts, and grew up in San Antonio, Texas. She graduated from Wesleyan University with a double major in history and religion.

Clark earned a Master of Planning (MPlan) from the University of Minnesota's Humbert H. Humphrey School of Public Affairs, and a Ph.D. in City and Regional Planning from Cornell University.

== Career ==
In 2005, Clark joined the School of Public Policy at the Georgia Institute of Technology as an assistant professor. She was tenured and promoted to associate professor in 2011. While at Georgia Tech, she served as the founding Director of the Center for Urban Innovation, an interdisciplinary research center, from 2012 to 2019.

From 2015 to 2018, Clark served as vice-chair, and later chair, of the Economic Geography Specialty Group of the Association of American Geographers (AAG).

In 2019, Clark was named Head of the City and Regional Planning Section at Ohio State University's Knowlton School of Architecture in the College of Engineering. Clark teaches urban and regional economic development, research design, and policy analysis.

In September 2021, Clark was named visiting professor at the University of Stavanger's Business School and its Center for Innovation Research.

In 2023, Clark was appointed as Knowlton School Distinguished Professor.

Clark is Editor-in-Chief of the journal Regional Studies since 2023. Previously she served as Deputy Editor in Chief (2018–2023) and as an Editor. She is a Fellow of both the American Association of Geographers (2017), and the Regional Studies Association (2018).

== Awards ==
- Clark twice won the Best Book Award from the Regional Studies Association in 2009, (Note: with Susan Christopherson, for their 2007 book, Remaking Regional Economies: Power, Labor, and Firm Strategies in the Knowledge Economy.) and in 2022.
- In 2021, Clark received the Urban Affairs Association Best Book Award for her book Uneven Innovation: The Work of Smart Cities.

== Selected publications ==
=== Books ===
- Clark, Jennifer. Uneven innovation: The work of smart cities. Columbia University Press, 2020. ISBN 9780231184977
- Clark, Jennifer. Working regions: Reconnecting innovation and production in the knowledge economy. Routledge, 2013. ISBN 9780415676892
- Patton, Carl, David Sawicki, and Jennifer Clark. Basic methods of policy analysis and planning. Reprinted Routledge, 2015. ISBN 9780137495092
- Christopherson, Susan, and Jennifer Clark. Remaking Regional Economies: Power, Labor and Firm Strategies. Routledge, 2007, reprinted 2020. ISBN 9780415357432

=== Edited books ===
- Turok, Ivan, David Bailey, Jennifer Clark, Jun Du, Ugo Fratesi, Michael Fritsch, John Harrison, Tom Kemeny, Dieter Kogler, Arnoud Lagendijk, Tomasz Mickiewicz, Ernest Miguelez, Stefano Usai, and Fiona Wishlade, eds. Transitions in Regional Economic Development. London: Routledge, 2018.
- Bryson, John R., Jennifer Clark, and Vida Vanchan, eds. Handbook of manufacturing industries in the world economy. Edward Elgar Publishing, 2015.

=== Articles ===
- Bailey, David, Jennifer Clark, Alessandra Colombelli, Carlo Corradini, Lisa De Propris, Ben Derudder, Ugo Fratesi et al. "Regions in a time of pandemic." Regional Studies 54, no. 9 (2020): 1163–1174. doi:10.1080/00343404.2020.1798611
- Clark, Jennifer, and Supraja Sudharsan. "Firm Strategies and Path Dependencies: An Emerging Economic Geography of the Industrial Data Industry." Regional Studies (2019). doi:10.1080/00343404.2019.1619926
- Clark, Jennifer, and Marc Doussard. "Devolution, Disinvestment and Uneven Development: US Industrial Policy and Evolution of the National Network for Manufacturing Innovation." Cambridge Journal of Regions, Economy and Society (2019). doi:10.1093/cjres/rsz009
- Clark, Jennifer, and David Bailey. "Labour, work and regional resilience." Regional Studies 52, no. 6 (2018): 741–744. doi:10.1080/00343404.2018.1448621
- Clark, Jennifer. "Manufacturing by design: the rise of regional intermediaries and the re-emergence of collective action." Cambridge Journal of Regions, Economy and Society 7, no. 3 (2014): 433–448. doi:10.1093/cjres/rsu017
- Clark, Jennifer, Hsin-I. Huang, and John P. Walsh. "A typology of ‘innovation districts’: what it means for regional resilience." Cambridge Journal of Regions, Economy and Society 3, no. 1 (2010): 121–137. doi:10.1093/cjres/rsp034
- Christopherson, Susan, and Jennifer Clark. "Limits to ‘the learning region’: what university-centered economic development can (and cannot) do to create knowledge-based regional economies." Local Economy 25, no. 2 (2010): 120–130. doi:10.1080/02690941003741127
- Clark, Jennifer. "Coordinating a conscious geography: the role of research centers in multi-scalar innovation policy and economic development in the US and Canada." The Journal of Technology Transfer 35 (2010): 460–474. doi:10.1007/s10961-009-9137-z
- Clark, Jennifer, and Susan Christopherson. "Integrating investment and equity: A critical regionalist agenda for a progressive regionalism." Journal of Planning Education and Research 28, no. 3 (2009): 341–354. doi:10.1177/0739456X08327371
- Christopherson, Susan, and Jennifer Clark. "Power in firm networks: What it means for regional innovation systems." Regional Studies 41, no. 9 (2007): 1223–1236. doi:10.1080/00343400701543330
