= Patrick Woolley =

American lawyer

Academic background
- Education: Stanford University (AB); Yale University (JD)

Academic work
- Discipline: Law
- Sub-discipline: Civil procedure Constitutional law Conflict of laws Federal court system
- Institutions: University of Texas School of Law

Patrick Woolley is an American legal scholar working as the Beck, Redden & Secrest Professor of Law at the University of Texas School of Law.

== Education ==
Woolley earned a Bachelor of Arts degree from Stanford University and a Juris Doctor from Yale Law School.

== Career ==
Prior to joining the University of Texas as an assistant professor in 1994, Woolley practiced law at Munger, Tolles & Olson in Los Angeles. Woolley's scholarship focuses on civil procedure, conflict of laws, federal courts, and constitutional law.
