= Ginger D. Anders =

American lawyer (born 1977)

- Born: August 28, 1977 (age 48)
- Education: Yale University (BA); Columbia Law School (JD)
- Occupation: Lawyer
- Employer: Munger, Tolles & Olson
- Known for: Former Assistant to the Solicitor General of the United States

Ginger D. Anders (born August 28, 1977) is an American lawyer who formerly served as Assistant to the Solicitor General of the United States. She currently is in private practice in Washington, D.C.

== Education ==
Anders earned a bachelor's degree summa cum laude in 1999 in East Asian Studies from Yale University. She also earned a J.D. degree from Columbia Law School in 2002, where she was articles editor for the Columbia Law Review.

== Early legal career ==
After law school, Anders worked as a law clerk to Southern District of New York Judge Gerard E. Lynch from 2002 until 2003 and for United States Court of Appeals for the Second Circuit Judge Sonia Sotomayor from 2003 until 2004. Anders also worked as a law clerk for United States Supreme Court Associate Justice Ruth Bader Ginsburg from 2004 until 2005.

Anders began working as an Associate for the law firm of Jenner & Block in 2005. During her time at Jenner & Block, Anders worked in the firm's Litigation Practice and in its Appellate and Supreme Court Practice.

In 2006, as part of a team of lawyers representing a death row inmate in Missouri, Anders helped to persuade United States District Judge Fernando J. Gaitan Jr. that Missouri's revised lethal injection procedure was not enough to ensure that condemned inmates would not suffer unnecessary and unconstitutional pain. The ruling later was reversed by the United States Court of Appeals for the Eighth Circuit and ultimately was upheld by the Supreme Court of the United States, paving the way for executions to occur in Missouri. Anders also performed pro bono work challenging the constitutionality of lethal injection procedures in California. For her pro bono work on these cases, Anders in November 2007 was awarded the firm's Albert E. Jenner Pro Bono Award.

== Assistant to the Solicitor General ==
On February 4, 2009, Jenner & Block announced that Anders would be one of several Jenner lawyers, along with Thomas J. Perrelli and Donald Verrilli Jr., leaving the firm to join the administration of President Barack Obama. Anders was hired as an Assistant to the Solicitor General-designate at the time, Elena Kagan.

== Private practice ==
In 2017, Anders joined the law firm of Munger, Tolles & Olson as a partner in its Washington, D.C. office.

== See also ==
- List of law clerks for the sixth seat of the Supreme Court of the United States
