= Cesare P.R. Romano =

Italian-American international law scholar (born 1969)

Cesare P. R. Romano
- Born: February 4, 1969 (age 57)
- Citizenship: Italy (EU) and USA
- Education: University of Milan; Graduate Institute of International Studies, Geneva

Cesare P.R. Romano (born February 4, 1969), is an Italian and American international law scholar, known as an authority on international law, international courts, and international human rights. He is a professor of law at Loyola Law School Los Angeles.

== Early life ==
Cesare Romano is the son of Tullio Romano, an Italian pop-star of the 1960s, member of the Los Marcellos Ferial. He grew up between Milan, Italy, where he was schooled, and Vienna, Austria, where his mother's family lives.

== Career ==
Between 1988 and 1992, he studied Political Science at the University of Milan, where he graduated (Laurea) with the highest grades, with a thesis on Public International Law on Compliance Control under the 1968 Treaty on the Non-Proliferation of Nuclear Weapons. His thesis director was Giorgio Sacerdoti. After receiving his degree, Prof. Romano studied for a year at the Institute for International Political Studies (ISPI), in Milan, preparing for the admission test to the Italian Ministry of Foreign Affairs.

In 1993, he moved to Geneva, to study at the Graduate Institute of International Studies. In 1995, he obtained the Diplôme d’Études Supérieures (DES) with specialization in international law. He was given full scholarship to continue studying towards a Ph.D., which he completed in 1999, on the Peaceful Settlement of International Environmental Disputes, which he successfully defended before Lucius Caflisch, Georges Abi-Saab and Pierre-Marie Dupuy.

In 1996, he moved to New York City, to study at New York University School of Law. He graduated from NYU with an LL.M. in International Legal Studies. During the first few days of his stay at NYU he was offered by Shepard Forman to join the then-soon-to-be Center on International Cooperation (CIC). At CIC, Cesare Romano launched PICT - the Project on International Courts and Tribunals, a joint undertaking of CIC and the Foundation for International Environmental Law and Development (FIELD), at the School of Oriental and African Studies, University of London, and, since 2002, the Faculty of Laws of the Centre for International Courts and Tribunals, at University College London, collaborating with Philippe Sands and Ruth Mackenzie.

PICT was described by some scholars as an influential project in the study of international dispute settlement. Its approach examines individual international adjudicative bodies as part of a broader, emerging international judiciary, rather than as entirely separate institution. The project's website also servers as an early centralized resource, providing information on multiple international judicial bodies and enabling comparative research.

Romano's activities at PICT were funded by William and Flora Hewlett Foundation, John & Catherine MacArthur Foundation, and the Ford Foundation.

In 2006, Prof. Romano joined Loyola Law School Los Angeles, receiving tenure in 2009. In 2011, he founded at Loyola Law School Los Angeles the International Human Rights Clinic. He has litigated of dozens of cases before the Inter-American Commission of Human Rights and specialized United Nations human rights bodies, including the Human Rights Committee; the Committee of the Convention on the Elimination of All Forms of Discrimination against Women; the Committee of the International Covenant on Economic, Social and Cultural Rights; prepared amici curiae briefs for the Inter-American Court of Human Rights and several domestic courts; prepared shadow reports for the United Nations Universal Periodic Review and the periodic reports on the International Covenant on Civil and Political Rights.

== Honors ==
2014: Hidden Hero Award of the CSJ Center for Reconciliation and Justice for his work in the human rights field.

1996-1997: Fulbright Scholarship

1996/1997: Albert Gallatin Fellowship in International Affairs

1996 : Palanti Prize for the best dissertation on issues relating to international peace and security. Awarded by the university of Milan

== Publications ==
Prof. Dr. Romano has authored 8 books, 21 articles and papers and 27 contributions to collective works. Several of Romano's works have been acclaimed as innovative and ground breaking, stirring debate, nationally and internationally.

=== Peaceful Settlement of International Environmental Disputes ===
Romano's Ph.D. dissertation was published by Kluwer in 2000 under the title "The Peaceful Settlement of International Environmental Disputes: A Pragmatic Approach". In his "authoritative and comprehensive" book, Romano argues that arbitration is a more effective means to settle international environmental disputes that resort to judicial bodies, like the International Court of Justice. "Romano eschews traditional explanations of the process by which nations settle these disputes in this important, comprehensive and very readable book that surveys and review the classic conflicts of international environmental law".

=== The International Judge ===
Romano co-authored the book with Daniel Terris, an historian, and Leigh Swigart, an anthropologist, directors of the International Center for Ethics, Justice and Public Life of Brandeis University. The book was forwarded by Justice Sonia Sotomayor, of the United States Supreme Court. In her preface, Sotomayor wrote "A proposed bill in Congress to prohibit the citation of foreign law in federal judicial decisions gave rise in recent years to a heated and extensive dialogue among American judges, academics, and commentators on the appropriate role that foreign and international law should play in American constitutional adjudication. But the question of how much we have to learn from foreign law and the international community in interpreting our Constitution is not the only one worth posing. As The International Judge makes clear, we should also question how much we have to learn from international courts and from their men and women judges about judging and the factors outside of the law that influence our decisions. This book makes an invaluable contribution to efforts to answer that question by laying bare the institutional, political, moral, ethical, and legal concerns that animate the work of international courts and their judges". Sotomayor wrote this preface when she was still a Federal Judge on the 2nd Circuit Court of Appeals. During confirmation hearings for her appointment at the U.S. Supreme Court, her preface was used by conservatives to question her suitability for the position.

=== The United States and International Courts and Tribunals ===
The Sword and the Scales: The United States and International Courts and Tribunals, Cambridge University Press, 2009. "The Sword and the Scales ... is one of the first systematic treatments of the United States’ engagement with international courts and tribunals. With a star-studded cast of contributors, this volume proposes nothing less than ... offering a ‘correlation and causation’ between the rise of the US as a superpower and the ‘judicialization’ of international relations (p. xiv), the ‘first comprehensive look at U.S. attitudes toward a very large range of judicial and … quasi-judicial international institutions and procedures’ (p. xvi)". The book features a heated debate between Romano and John Bellinger III, the Legal Adviser for the U.S. Department of State and the U.S. National Security Council during the George W. Bush administration, over the attitude the United States should have toward international courts and tribunals.

=== International adjudication ===
"Romano C./Alter K./Shany Y. (eds.), The Oxford University Press Handbook of International Adjudication, 2014". “The Oxford Handbook emerges as a resource for those interested in international adjudication. It represents the distillation and refinement of great debates in the area and accommodates a diversity of approaches, ranging from the extremely pragmatic, to the forensically descriptive, to the lofty and theoretical.” “The approach taken in the Oxford Handbook is taxonomic: it aspires to provide a comprehensive resource that describes existing institutions and the debates that are associated with them, whilst simultaneously seeking to constitute itself as a repository of contemporary practice and challenges facing international adjudication. For this reason, it departs from the traditional style of legal scholarship in its generous use of tables in its annexes and a detailed pull-out chart, presenting data on the world’s international courts in a manner redolent of the charts distributed by the National Geographic Society.”
