= Patricia A. Dean =

American lawyer (1949–2004)

Patricia A. Dean (1949 – October 27, 2004) was an American attorney and a partner with the Arnold & Porter law firm in Washington, D.C.. She was a deputy clerk of the U.S. Supreme Court from 1978 to 1981, the first woman to serve in that position, and then served as a law clerk for Justice Byron White of the United States Supreme Court from 1982 to 1983.

== Early life and education ==
After graduating from J.E.B. Stuart High School in Fairfax, Virginia, Dean graduated from Georgetown University, continuing on to get her law degree from there in 1981. Her father, Paul R. Dean, was dean of the Georgetown University Law Center for 15 years.

== Career ==
While attending night classes at Georgetown University Law Center, Dean held a job as a court clerk at the Supreme Court. By the time she had completed law school, she had been promoted to the position of deputy clerk, at the time the highest ranking position held by a woman working for the Supreme Court. After graduating, she left the position to become a law clerk for Judge Edward A. Tamm of the United States Court of Appeals for the District of Columbia Circuit, then returned to the Supreme Court as a law clerk for Justice White. Reporting her selection, The New York Times commented, "It may be that she knows the Court better than any law clerk who ever walked in the door."

While a partner with the Arnold & Porter law firm in Washington, DC, she worked on cases involving Fen-Phen, which was ultimately recalled from the market., She worked with former co-clerk William T. Dzurilla on the defense of a First Amendment challenge to the constitutionality of seven federal, state, and local school aid programs, which culminated in Mitchell v. Helms, a U.S. Supreme Court decision overruling previous authority.

== Death ==
She died of cancer on October 27, 2004.

== See also ==
- List of law clerks for the sixth seat of the Supreme Court of the United States
