= William T. Dzurilla =

American lawyer (born 1953)

- Born: December 19, 1953 (age 72)
- Education: Mainland High School; University of Louisiana at Lafayette (BA); Tulane University Law School (JD)
- Occupation: Attorney
- Spouse: Daria Mariani (m. 2000)
- Children: 2

William T. Dzurilla, formerly William T. D'Zurilla, is a retired American attorney. He was a law clerk for Justice Byron White of the United States Supreme Court from 1982 to 1983. He played a key role in the privatization of major state-owned businesses in Slovakia.

== Biography ==
Born on December 19, 1953, the grandson of Slovak immigrants, Dzurilla grew up in Carteret, New Jersey. His family moved to Holly Hill, Florida, and he graduated from Mainland High School in Daytona Beach. He received his B.A. degree from the University of Louisiana at Lafayette in 1978, and his J.D. from Tulane Law School in 1981.

After graduation, he clerked for Judge Albert Tate of the United States Court of Appeals for the Fifth Circuit from 1981 to 1982 and then for Justice Byron White of the U.S. Supreme Court from 1982 to 1983.

After completing his clerkship, Dzurilla joined the New Orleans firm of Gordon Arata McCollam & Duplantis, where he stayed for 15 years. He worked with his former co-clerk Patricia A. Dean on the defense of a First Amendment challenge to the constitutionality of seven federal, state, and local school aid programs, which culminated in Mitchell v. Helms, a U.S. Supreme Court decision overruling previous authority. Dzurilla also helped obtain a unanimous Louisiana Supreme Court decision finding Louisiana's forum non conveniens statute contrary to the Supremacy Clause of the U.S. Constitution, an appellate decision striking down Louisiana's Any Willing Provider statute as preempted by ERISA, and a U.S. Fifth Circuit opinion overturning a criminal mail fraud conviction on double jeopardy grounds.

In 1990, on behalf of the Federal Bar Association's Democracy Development Initiative, Dzurilla spent two months in Moscow, Russia as an advisor to the Russian Constitutional Commission, which was preparing the first non-socialist constitution of the Russian Federation. The commission was chaired by Russian president Boris Yeltsin, and Dzurilla worked closely with Oleg Rumyantsev, the chairman of the commission's working group. The commission's work led to the enactment of the 1993 Constitution of Russia. However, as a result of the 1993 Russian constitutional crisis, the final version differed from the commission's draft by substantially increasing the powers of the president.

In 1998, Dzurilla accepted a Fulbright Scholarship to teach law at the Comenius University in Bratislava, Slovakia. While in Slovakia, he joined White & Case and stayed with that firm for four years, handling several important deals in the Slovak Republic's transition from a Soviet satellite to a full member of the European Union. Mr. Dzurilla worked with Slovak Minister of Finance Brigita Schmögnerová on the privatization of the Slovak Savings Bank (Slovenská sporiteľňa) and the General Credit Bank (VÚB), the two largest Slovak banks. He represented Electricite de France in its acquisition of the Central Slovak Electric Company, and Allianz in its purchase of the Slovak Insurance Company. He advised the Slovak government in the sale of 49% of the shares of the Transpetrol AS oil pipeline company to the Russian company Yukos, then headed by Mikhail Khodorkovsky.

In 2004, Dzurilla rejoined his former co-clerk Stuart H. Singer, who offered him a position with Boies Schiller & Flexner in Fort Lauderdale. Since returning to the United States, Dzurilla has focused on complex litigation and arbitration. He has represented clients such as NASCAR and Florida Power & Light, and he is involved in class-action litigation against Quixtar.

Dzurilla married Daria Mariani in 2000 in Slovakia. They have two children, William (Billy) and Pavel (Paul).

== Works ==
- Reflections of a Dalkon Shield Arbitrator, 53 Dispute Resolution Journal 13 (1998)
- Farewell to Lenin: The Story of Russia's New, Non-Communist Constitution, 38 Federal Bar News & Journal 410 (1991)
- Federal Health Care Bills Include ADR, 41 La. B.J. 560 (1994)
- Individual Responsibility for Torture Under International Law, 56 Tulane L.Rev. 186 (1981)
- Cuba's 1976 Socialist Constitution and the Fidelista Interpretation of Cuban Constitutional History, 55 Tulane L.Rev. 1223 (1981)

== See also ==
- List of law clerks for the sixth seat of the Supreme Court of the United States
- List of University of Louisiana at Lafayette people
- List of Tulane University people
- List of Slovak Americans
