= John B. Frank =

American businessman

John Bernkopf Frank
- Born: 1956 (age 69–70)
- Education: Wesleyan University (B.A.); University of Michigan (J.D.)
- Occupations: Investor, lawyer
- Known for: Vice-chairman of Oaktree Capital Management
- Spouse: Diann Hyung Kim
- Parent(s): Sally Bernkopf Frank; Howard A. Frank

John Bernkopf Frank (born 1956) is the vice chairman of Oaktree Capital Management, having previously served as managing principal.

== Early life ==
John Bernkopf Frank was born in 1956, the son of Sally (née Bernkopf) and Howard A. Frank. His father was a professor of surgery at the Harvard Medical School; his mother was a financial administrator at the Children's Hospital Boston. He attended Wesleyan University, where he graduated with a B.A. in history with honors. Afterwards, he became a legislative assistant to Robert F. Drinan, a member of Congress. Frank later received his J.D. from University of Michigan Law School, graduating Magna Cum Laude. In law school, he was managing editor of the Michigan Law Review and a member of the Order of the Coif. He is a member of the State Bar of California.

== Career ==
After graduating from the University of Michigan Law School, Frank became a law clerk for Frank M. Coffin of the United States Court of Appeals for the First Circuit. In 1984 he went to Munger, Tolles & Olson. While in private practice he was listed in Woodward and White's Best Lawyers in America.

In July 2001 he joined Oaktree Capital Management as general counsel. He remained in that position until 2006, and in May 2007 he became managing principal of Oaktree Capital Management. Frank became vice chairman in 2014, a role that shifts his focus to developing relationships with Oaktree's investors and business partners. He has been an Oaktree director since May 2007.

== Personal life ==
Frank is on Chevron Corporation's Board of Directors and is a trustee at Wesleyan University, the Polytechnic School, Good Samaritan Hospital of Los Angeles, and the XPRIZE Foundation. In 1984, he married Diann Hyung Kim in a Presbyterian ceremony at the Harvard Memorial Church in Cambridge, Massachusetts.
