= Robert Denham =

American businessman (1945–2025)

Robert Edwin Denham (August 27, 1945 – March 15, 2025) was an American lawyer known for crisis management at struggling companies. Denham worked with Warren Buffett to reform Salomon Brothers and prevent its insolvency after a bids-rigging scandal. He continued as chairman and CEO of the firm until a $9 billion sale to Travelers Group.

== Biography ==
Denham was born on August 27, 1945, in Dallas. He was raised in Abilene.

He graduated magna cum laude from the University of Texas and received a Juris Doctor degree from the Harvard Law School and an M.A. in government from the John F. Kennedy School of Government at Harvard University.

He was a partner in the law firm Munger, Tolles & Olson from 1973 to 1991, and again from 1998. He was chief executive officer of Salomon Brothers from 1992 to 1997. He was on the board of directors of the New York Times Company, Oaktree Capital Management, UGL, FEMSA and Chevron Corporation.

He was chairman of the John D. and Catherine T. MacArthur Foundation and vice chairman of the Good Samaritan Hospital of Los Angeles. He was a trustee of the James Irvine Foundation, the New Village Charter High School and the Russell Sage Foundation.

He died of cancer on March 15, 2025.
