= Ronald Olson =

American lawyer

Ronald L. Olson (born July 9, 1941) is an American attorney and a partner in the Los Angeles office of Munger Tolles & Olson LLP. He was the lead attorney representing the board of directors of Yahoo! in connection with Microsoft's proposed acquisition of Yahoo!, and was contemporaneously involved in Yahoo!'s Google outsourcing contract.

== Education ==
Olson received his baccalaureate degree from Drake University, before studying law at Linacre College, University of Oxford, and completing a Juris Doctor from the University of Michigan Law School.

== Career ==
In 1967, Olson worked as a civil rights attorney in the Civil Rights Division of the United States Department of Justice. In 1968, he clerked for the Chief Judge of the United States Court of Appeals for the District of Columbia Circuit, David L. Bazelon. Olson is a member of the Council on Foreign Relations.

In 1968, Olson joined the Los Angeles law firm now known as Munger, Tolles & Olson, and has practiced there since then. Olson’s field of specialization is litigation and corporate counseling. He counsels individual executives and boards of directors in a range of matters, including corporate governance.

In 1997, Olson became a director of Berkshire Hathaway.He retired as a director in May 2025 at the same time as the board's longtime chairman, Warren Buffett, announced his intention to retire from the company at the end of the year.

== Notable activities ==
As a member of the American Bar Association, Olson was formerly Chairman of the Standing Committee on Federal Judiciary (1991–92), Chairman of the Litigation Section (1981–82), and Chairman of the Alternative Dispute Resolution Committee (1976–86). He also served as Vice President of the Board of Governors of the State Bar of California (1986–87). He is a fellow of the American College of Trial Lawyers.

Olson was elected to the American Law Institute in 1990 and served as an Adviser on the ALI's Federal Judicial Code project.

Olson is a director of Berkshire Hathaway, Edison International, City National Corporation, The Washington Post Company, and Western Asset Trusts. He serves as a director of several non-profits, including the RAND Corporation (formerly chair), the Mayo Clinic, the Council of Foreign Relations, Southern California Public Radio (formerly chair), the Norton Simon Museum and the California Institute of Technology. He was Chairman of the Board of Trustees of Claremont University Center and Graduate School from 1984 to 1994.
