= Paul W. Kahn =

American judge (born 1952)

- Born: 1952 (age 73–74)
- Citizenship: United States
- Education: University of Chicago (B.A.); Yale Law School (J.D., Ph.D.)
- Occupation: Law professor
- Employer: Yale Law School

Paul W. Kahn (born 1952) is the Robert W. Winner Professor of Law and the Humanities at Yale Law School and the director of the Orville H. Schell, Jr. Center for International Human Rights.

== Education ==
Kahn received his Bachelor of Arts from the University of Chicago in 1973, his Ph.D. from Yale University in 1977, and his Juris Doctor from Yale Law School in 1980. After graduation, he clerked for the U.S. Supreme Court Justice Byron White from 1980 to 1982. He joined the faculty of Yale Law School in 1985, where he teaches courses on constitutional law, human rights, and political theology.

== Philosophy ==
Kahn's work focuses on the social imaginary. Like many constitutional theorists, Kahn is interested in what makes law legitimate. Unlike most constitutional theorists, his answer is phenomenological: legitimacy is something that we experience, not something that can be guaranteed by theoretical accounts of law.

Much of Kahn's scholarship has examined the competing narratives of meaning at play in legal discourse. In some contexts, one wants law to be principled and durable; in others, one wants it to be particularized and flexible. For Kahn, these dialectical currents are the foundation of a political theology of law—a concept he borrows from Carl Schmitt. Kahn argues that "sacrifice" is a central category of legal meaning. It unites the figure of the soldier (who sacrifices for the nation) with the figure of the parent (who sacrifices for the child), and by doing so, it ties public meaning and private meaning together. A legal order for which one would not be willing to sacrifice has no claim to ultimate significance—or legitimacy. In this vein, much of Kahn's work has focused on demonstrating the inability of liberal political theory to provide a satisfying account of law.

In its emphasis on "sacrifice", and on the limitations of liberalism, Kahn's project bears some similarities to that of Giorgio Agamben.

On May 6, 2022, The Hill published an opinion by Kahn in which he argues that the originalist position regarding Roe v. Wade errs by purporting that their interpreted "truth of the law" should be more important than "the rule of law" and that thereby, the originalist position does not reach the standard needed to justify overruling the opinion.

== Works ==
- Legitimacy and History: Self-government in American Constitutional Theory, Yale University Press, 1993
- The Reign of Law: Marbury v. Madison and the Construction of America, Yale University Press, 1997
- The Cultural Study of Law: Reconstructing Legal Scholarship, University of Chicago Press, 1999
- Law and Love: The Trials of King Lear, Yale University Press, 2000
- Putting Liberalism in its Place, Princeton University Press, 2005
- Out of Eden: Adam and Eve and the Problem of Evil, Princeton University Press, 2007
- Sacred Violence: Torture, Terror, and Sovereignty, University of Michigan Press, 2008
- Political Theology: Four New Chapters on the Concept of Sovereignty, Columbia University Press, 2011
- Finding Ourselves at the Movies: Philosophy for a New Generation, Columbia University Press, 2013
- Making the Case: The Art of the Judicial Opinion, Yale University Press, 2016
- Testimony, Cascade Books, 2021

== Personal life ==
Kahn is married to Catherine Iino, former First Selectman of Killingworth, Connecticut. They have two children.

== See also ==
- List of law clerks for the sixth seat of the Supreme Court of the United States
