= Kirk E. Sherriff =

American judge (born 1968)

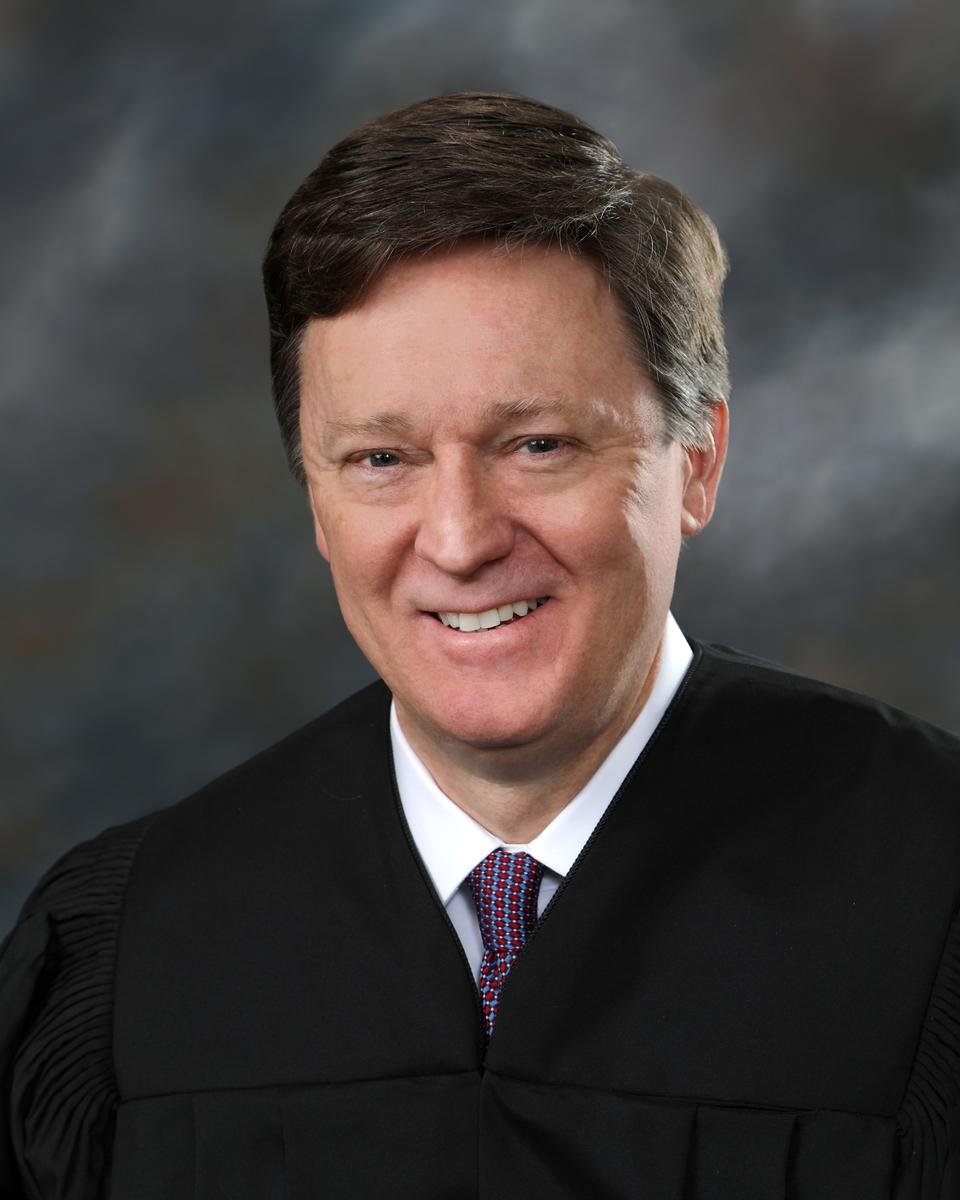

Judge of the United States District Court for the Eastern District of California
- Incumbent
- Assumed office February 7, 2024
- Appointed by: Joe Biden
- Preceded by: Ana de Alba

Personal details
- Born: Kirk Edward Sherriff; 1968 (age 57–58) Berkeley, California, U.S.
- Spouse: Samya Burney
- Education: Columbia University (BA); Harvard University (JD)

Kirk Edward Sherriff (born 1968) is an American lawyer from California who has served as a United States district judge of the United States District Court for the Eastern District of California since 2024.

== Early life and education ==
Sherff grew up in Sacramento, raised by a single mother. Sherriff received a Bachelor of Arts, cum laude, from Columbia University in 1990 and a Juris Doctor, cum laude, from Harvard Law School in 1995.

== Career ==
Before law school, Sherriff worked as a high school teacher in public schools in the Mississippi Teacher Corps. From 1996 to 1997, he served as a law clerk for Chief Justice Deborah Poritz of the Supreme Court of New Jersey. From 1995 to 1996 and again from 1997 to 2001, Sherriff was an associate at the law firm White & Case L.L.P. From 2002 to 2024, he served as an assistant United States attorney in the U.S. Attorney's Office for the Eastern District of California. He served in the civil division from 2002 to 2007, then in the criminal division from 2007 to 2015, including as chief of the white collar crime unit from 2012 to 2015. From 2015 to 2024, he served as chief for the U.S. Attorney's Office in Fresno.

=== Federal judicial service ===
On September 6, 2023, President Joe Biden announced his intent to nominate Sherriff to serve as a United States district judge of the United States District Court for the Eastern District of California. On November 15, 2023, his nomination was sent to the Senate. President Biden nominated Sherriff to the seat vacated by Judge Ana de Alba, who was elevated to the United States Court of Appeals for the Ninth Circuit on November 16, 2023. On November 29, 2023, a hearing on his nomination was held before the Senate Judiciary Committee. During his confirmation hearing, he was criticized over his past ACLU membership and prior contributions to the progressive fundraising group Act Blue. On January 3, 2024, his nomination was returned to the president under Rule XXXI, Paragraph 6 of the United States Senate and he was renominated on January 8, 2024. On January 18, 2024, his nomination was reported out of committee by a 12–9 vote. On January 25, 2024, the Senate invoked cloture on his nomination by a 51–42 vote. On January 31, 2024, his nomination was confirmed by a 54–45 vote. Sherriff received his judicial commission on February 7, 2024, and took the oath of office on the same day.

Legal offices
Preceded by Ana de Alba	Judge of the United States District Court for the Eastern District of California; 2024–present	Incumbent
