= Gordon B. Davidson =

American lawyer (1926–2015)

- Born: June 24, 1926; Louisville, Kentucky, U.S.
- Died: August 17, 2015 (aged 89); Louisville, Kentucky, U.S.
- Education: Centre College, University of Louisville Louis D. Brandeis School of Law, Yale Law School
- Occupation: Attorney

Gordon B. Davidson (June 24, 1926 – July 17, 2015) was a Louisville, Kentucky-based business attorney, and a member of the Louisville Sponsoring Group, the collection of business leaders who put up the money that launched Muhammad Ali into professional boxing.

== Background ==
Davidson was a lifelong resident of Louisville, Kentucky, who was born there on June 24, 1926. He attended Centre College in Danville, Kentucky. Davidson earned his J.D. from University of Louisville Louis D. Brandeis School of Law, as well as a LL.M. from Yale Law School in 1952. He was admitted to the Bar of the Commonwealth of Kentucky in 1951.

== Career ==
From 1954 to 1955, Davidson was a law clerk to U.S. Supreme Court Justice Stanley Forman Reed. He and other clerks did research on the Brown vs. Board of Education desegregation litigation.

In 1960, Davidson was part of the Louisville Sponsoring Group, who was responsible for signing Muhammad Ali to boxing. The contract was signed on October 26, 1960, and Ali's first professional fight took place three days later, on October 29, 1960.

Mr. Davidson served as managing partner at Wyatt, Tarrant & Combs from 1980 to 1995.

== Community activities ==
Davidson served on the board of important companies, including The Courier-Journal and BellSouth. He held leadership positions on the boards of a civic, charitable and educational institutions: Greater Louisville Inc., Louisville Central Area, Kentucky Derby Festival, and the Louisville Development Committee. After numerous years of leadership for the Kentucky Center for the Arts, he was a Director Emeritus for the organization.

In 1973, he was named as an Outstanding Louisville Alumni for Centre College for his devotion to the school and his distinguished career.

In 1989, the Louisville Area Chamber of Commerce bestowed on Davidson its top civic-service award, the Gold Cup, for his leadership at a number of major arts and civic organizations in the region.

== See also ==
- List of law clerks for the sixth seat of the Supreme Court of the United States
