= Uneven Innovation =

2020 book by Jennifer Clark

Uneven Innovation: The Work of Smart Cities
- Cover
- Author: Jennifer J. Clark
- Language: English
- Subject: Sociology, economic geography, smart cities
- Publisher: Columbia University Press
- Publication date: February 2020
- Media type: Paperback, Hardcover, E-book
- Pages: 328
- Awards: 2021 Best Book in the Field of Urban Affairs Award, Urban Affairs Association; 2022 Routledge Best Book Award, Regional Studies Association
- ISBN: 9780231184977

Uneven Innovation: The Work of Smart Cities is a 2020 book by Jennifer Clark, published by Columbia University Press. The book studies the concept of smart cities. Clark looks into how the integration of information and communication technologies into urban planning and public services can both address and exacerbate social and economic inequalities. Clark argues that while technological advancements promise efficiency, sustainability, and inclusivity, they often reinforce patterns of uneven development and inequality. Based on the history of technocratic urban solutions, the book provides an alternative framework for understanding the governance, regulation, and participatory challenges associated with smart cities. The author presents policy recommendations to encourage equitable urban innovation. The book won the 2021 Best Book in the Field of Urban Affairs Award from the Urban Affairs Association, and the 2022 Routledge Best Book Award from the Regional Studies Association.

== Summary ==
The book covers the role of smart cities in addressing urban challenges through the integration of digital technologies, while critiquing their tendency to exacerbate existing inequalities and create new forms of uneven development. It frames smart cities as projects driven by tech companies that use urban spaces for profit-making rather than equitable innovation. In eight chapters, Clark covers many themes such as the commodification of urban spaces, the exploitation of data, the amplification of labor precarity, and the tension between technology-driven solutions and localized governance. Clark argues that cities are often used as experimental grounds for technological innovation, with limited input from residents or attention to broader societal impacts.

The book also emphasizes the need for more democratic and participatory approaches to urban planning. It critiques the dominance of tech firms in shaping urban futures and argues for a shift toward greater accountability, evaluation, and citizen engagement in smart city projects. The conclusion and epilogue present policy recommendations. Clark advocates for a rethinking of governance structures to ensure that smart city initiatives address systemic urban challenges while promoting inclusivity and equity.

== Reviews ==
In his review, Marc Doussard identified three key arguments that Clark presents in the book.

1. that the smart cities project is "organized project under-taken by data, analytics, and device firms" focused on profit-making opportunities rather than driving equitable innovation
2. that urban politics play a critical role in shaping smart city projects. Cities often subsidize and de-risk these ventures to ensure their profitability even when they might not make any economic sense.
3. that the uneven development of smart cities projects is directly linked to broader patterns of uneven capitalist development. Clark introduces governance and democratic institutions as critical factors in mitigating inequalities and ensuring balanced development, complementing the focus on economic factors typically emphasized in the literature.

Doussard described the book as a "one-time economic geography staple many of us doubted we would see again."

Louis Enrique Santiago applauded Clark for exposing the capitalist rationales behind smart cities and their implications for global urban inequality. Santiago found the book not only relevant for developed-world contexts but also for cities in the Global South.

Joan Fitzgerald considered the book an important resource for understanding the challenges and implications of smart cities. Fitzgerald applauded the author for her unique and critical perspective on smart cities, all while acknowledging that her proposed alternatives require resources and time, which many cities lack.

In her review Laura Wolf-Powers praised Clark's emphasis on the need for more diverse expertise in shaping smart cities initiatives, calling for the inclusion of more scholars of urban studies along technologists. The reviewer stressed the author's argument that smart cities, as currently configured, exacerbate economic inequality and marginalize the urban poor.

== Awards ==
Award	Year	From
Routledge Best Book Award	2021	The Regional Studies Association
Best Book in the Field of Urban Affairs Award	2022	The Urban Affairs Association
