= Ana de Alba =

American judge (born 1979)

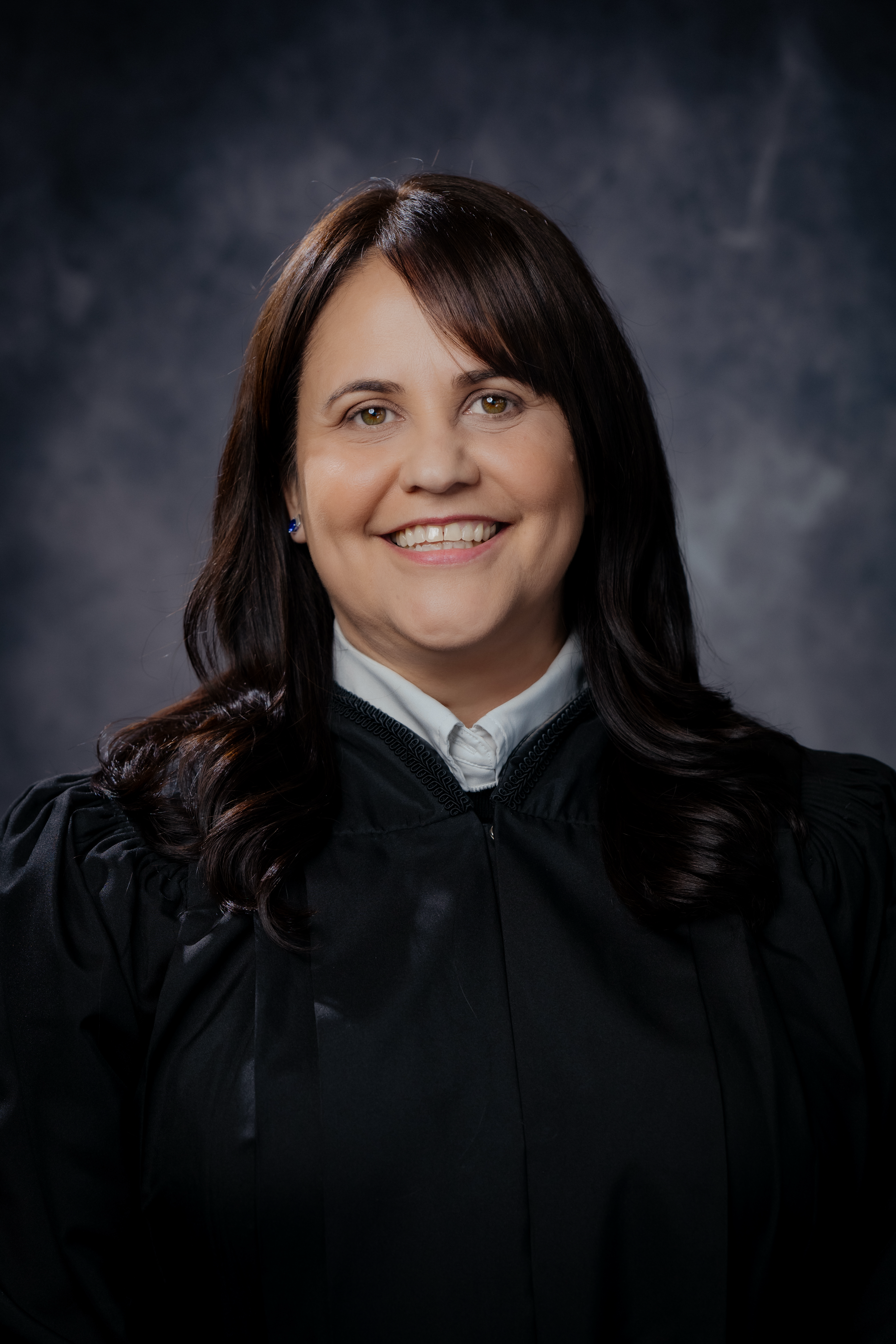

Judge of the United States Court of Appeals for the Ninth Circuit
- Incumbent
- Assumed office November 15, 2023
- Appointed by: Joe Biden
- Preceded by: Paul J. Watford

Judge of the United States District Court for the Eastern District of California
- In office July 7, 2022 – November 16, 2023
- Appointed by: Joe Biden
- Preceded by: Morrison C. England Jr.
- Succeeded by: Kirk E. Sherriff

Judge of the Fresno County Superior Court
- In office October 11, 2018 – July 7, 2022
- Appointed by: Jerry Brown
- Preceded by: Dale Ikeda
- Succeeded by: Geoffrey Wilson

Personal details
- Born: 1979 (age 46–47) Merced, California, U.S.
- Party: Democratic
- Education: University of California, Berkeley (BA, JD)

Ana Isabel de Alba (born 1979) is an American attorney who serves as a United States circuit judge of the United States Court of Appeals for the Ninth Circuit. She previously served as a United States district judge of the United States District Court for the Eastern District of California from 2022 to 2023.

== Early life and education ==
de Alba was born in Merced, California. She graduated from the University of California, Berkeley in 2002 with a Bachelor of Arts degree with highest honors. She then attended the UC Berkeley School of Law, graduating in 2007 with a Juris Doctor.

== Career ==
de Alba worked with the ACLU Immigrants' Rights Project in San Francisco, California, in 2007. From 2007 to 2013, de Alba was an associate at Lang Richet & Patch in Fresno. In 2013, she was promoted to partner, where her practice focused on torts, employment law, and construction law. In October 2018, Governor Jerry Brown appointed her as a judge of the Fresno County Superior Court to fill the seat left vacant by the retirement of Judge Dale Ikeda.

=== Federal judicial service ===
==== District court service ====
On January 19, 2022, President Joe Biden nominated de Alba to serve as a United States district judge for the United States District Court for the Eastern District of California. President Biden nominated her to the seat vacated by Judge Morrison C. England Jr., who assumed senior status on December 17, 2019. On April 27, 2022, a hearing on her nomination was held before the committee. On May 26, 2022, her nomination was favorably reported by the committee by a 12–10 vote. On June 13, 2022, Majority Leader Chuck Schumer filed cloture on her nomination. On June 16, 2022, the United States Senate invoked cloture on her nomination by a 52–43 vote. On June 21, 2022, her nomination was confirmed by a 53–45 vote. She received her judicial commission on July 7, 2022, and was sworn in on July 8, 2022. Her service was terminated on November 16, 2023, due to her elevation to the court of appeals.

==== Court of appeals ====
On April 14, 2023, President Biden announced his intent to nominate de Alba to serve as United States circuit judge for the United States Court of Appeals for the Ninth Circuit. On April 17, 2023, her nomination was sent to the Senate. Biden nominated de Alba to the seat being vacated by Judge Paul J. Watford, who subsequently resigned on May 31, 2023. On May 17, 2023, a hearing on her nomination was held before the Senate Judiciary Committee. During her confirmation hearing, Republican senators criticized her over her sentencing record during her tenure as a district court judge. She was questioned over her sentencing of a man convicted of possession of child pornography. de Alba sentenced the man to 66 months in jail, which fell below the federal sentencing guideline of 78 to 97 months. In 2021, de Alba released from home monitoring an illegal immigrant tied to the killing of a police officer. On June 8, 2023, her nomination was reported out of committee by a party-line 11–10 vote. On November 9, 2023, the United States Senate invoked cloture on her nomination by a 49–42 vote, with Senator Joe Manchin voting against the motion to invoke cloture on her nomination. On November 13, 2023, her nomination was confirmed by a 48–43 vote, with Senator Manchin voting against confirmation. She received her judicial commission on November 15, 2023.

== Personal life ==
de Alba is a Democrat.

== See also ==
- List of Hispanic and Latino American jurists

Legal offices
Preceded by Morrison C. England Jr.	Judge of the United States District Court for the Eastern District of California; 2022–2023	Succeeded by Kirk E. Sherriff
Preceded by Paul J. Watford	Judge of the United States Court of Appeals for the Ninth Circuit; 2023–present	Incumbent
