= Regional Studies (journal) =

- Discipline: Regional studies
- Language: English
- Edited by: Jennifer Clark

Publication details
- History: 1967-present
- Publisher: Taylor and Francis
- Frequency: Monthly
- Open access: Hybrid
- Impact factor: 4.4 (2023)

Standard abbreviations
- ISO 4: Reg. Stud.

Indexing
- CODEN: REGSAT
- ISSN: 0034-3404 (print); 1360-0591 (web)
- LCCN: sf80001291
- OCLC no.: 801819469

Links
- Journal homepage; Online access; Online archive

Regional Studies is a monthly peer-reviewed academic journal covering research in theoretical development, empirical analysis, and policy debate in the field of regional studies and regional science. It is an official journal of the Regional Studies Association and is published by Taylor and Francis. The editor-in-chief is Professor Jennifer Clark (Ohio State University).
