= Stuart H. Singer =

American attorney

Stuart H. Singer is an American attorney who is the managing partner of the Boies Schiller & Flexner law firm's Fort Lauderdale, Florida office, where he specializes in complex business litigation and represents clients such as NASCAR, Carnival Cruise Lines, Florida Power & Light, and Tyco International. He had been a law clerk for Justice Byron White of the United States Supreme Court from 1981 to 1983. He graduated in 1981 from Harvard Law School, where he served as Editor & President of the Harvard Law Review. He received his bachelor's degree in 1978 from Northwestern University, where he won the National Collegiate Debate Championship. He is listed in LawDragon's 500 Leading Lawyers in America. He is the co-author, with David W. Quinto, of Trade Secrets: Law & Practice (Oxford University Press, 2008).

== See also ==
- List of law clerks for the sixth seat of the Supreme Court of the United States
