= Journal of Law & Politics =

- Discipline: Law, politics, and jurisprudence
- Language: English
- Edited by: Madeline Conover

Publication details
- History: 1983-present
- Publisher: Journal of Law & Politics (United States)
- Frequency: Quarterly

Standard abbreviations
- Bluebook: J.L. & Pol.
- ISO 4: J. Law Politics

Indexing
- ISSN: 0749-2227
- LCCN: 86641291
- OCLC no.: 60620333

Links
- Journal homepage

The Journal of Law & Politics is a quarterly law review established in 1983 by students at the University of Virginia School of Law under the guidance of then-Circuit Judge Antonin Scalia. It publishes articles, essays, book reviews, and commentaries that focus on issues at the intersection of law and politics, including the role of the judiciary in making law, the relationship among the three branches of government, federalism, the politics of the judicial appointment process, voting rights, campaign finance, redistricting, voter initiatives, ethics investigations, the politics of education, and religious freedom in a pluralist society. The journal organizes regular symposia and debates.
