= Paul J. Watford =

American judge (born 1967)

Paul Watford
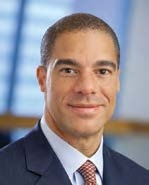

Judge of the United States Court of Appeals for the Ninth Circuit
- In office May 22, 2012 – May 31, 2023
- Appointed by: Barack Obama
- Preceded by: Pamela Ann Rymer
- Succeeded by: Ana de Alba

Personal details
- Born: Paul Jeffrey Watford; August 25, 1967 (age 58) Garden Grove, California, U.S.
- Education: University of California, Berkeley (BA); University of California, Los Angeles (JD)

Paul Jeffrey Watford (born August 25, 1967) is an American lawyer who served as a United States circuit judge of the United States Court of Appeals for the Ninth Circuit from 2012 to 2023. In 2016, The New York Times identified Watford as a potential Supreme Court nominee to replace Justice Antonin Scalia. Watford resigned his judgeship in 2023 and became a partner at the law firm Wilson Sonsini Goodrich & Rosati. He is currently a partner in the Business Litigation practice group of King & Spalding in Los Angeles.

== Early life and education ==
Watford was born in 1967 in Garden Grove, California. He attended the University of California, Berkeley, graduating in 1989 with a Bachelor of Arts. He worked as a legal interviewer for the San Francisco Bar Association's lawyer referral service from 1989 to 1991, then attended the UCLA School of Law, where he was an editor of the UCLA Law Review. He graduated in 1994 with a Juris Doctor and Order of the Coif membership.

== Career ==
After law school, Watford was a law clerk for Judge Alex Kozinski of the Ninth Circuit from 1994 to 1995, and for Justice Ruth Bader Ginsburg of the U.S. Supreme Court from 1995 to 1996. He is the only African American clerk Ginsburg hired during her 27-year tenure at the Supreme Court.

In 1996, Watford joined the law firm Munger, Tolles & Olson. From 1997 to 2000, Watford was an Assistant United States Attorney in the Major Frauds Section of the Criminal Division of the Central District of California, where he prosecuted a wide range of federal criminal cases, including white-collar criminal cases. In 2000 he joined the Los Angeles office of the Chicago-based law firm Sidley Austin, but he returned to Munger in 2001, where he became partner in 2003. At Munger, where he worked until his confirmation, he focused on appellate litigation, appearing regularly in state and federal courts to argue his cases. He has authored or edited nearly twenty briefs prepared for the Supreme Court.

Watford is an active member of the American Bar Association, serving as Co-Chair of the ABA Litigation Section's Appellate Practice Committee from 2005 to 2008 and as a member of the ABA's Amicus Curiae Committee from 2007 to 2010. From 2007 to 2009, he taught an upper-level course in judicial opinion writing at the University of Southern California's Gould School of Law. Since June 2012, he has served as treasurer and board member of Neighborhood Legal Services of Los Angeles County, a nonprofit providing pro bono legal services to the poor. He became a trustee of the Norton Simon Museum in 2019.

=== Federal judicial service ===
On October 17, 2011, President Barack Obama nominated Watford to a seat on the United States Court of Appeals for the Ninth Circuit. The seat had been vacated by Judge Pamela Ann Rymer, who died from cancer on September 21, 2011. The ABA Standing Committee on the Federal Judiciary unanimously rated Watford as a "well-qualified" nominee, the highest possible rating. The Senate Judiciary Committee held a hearing on Watford's nomination on December 13, 2011. On February 2, 2012, the Judiciary Committee reported Watford's nomination to the floor of the Senate by a 10–6 vote. At the hearing, Senator Patrick Leahy noted that Watford had support "from across the political spectrum," including support from a number of prominent conservative legal figures, including Orin Kerr and Eugene Volokh. On May 17, 2012, Senate Majority Leader Harry Reid filed a cloture motion on Watford's nomination, seeking to end debate on the nomination. The vote on the cloture motion had been scheduled for May 21, 2012. However, on May 21, Reid asked that the cloture motion be nullified, and that the Senate move to a straight, up-or-down vote on Watford's nomination, which was scheduled for later that day. The Senate confirmed Watford on May 21, 2012, by a 61–34 vote. He received his commission on May 22, 2012.

Watford resigned from the Ninth Circuit on May 31, 2023. He returned to private practice by joining Wilson Sonsini as a partner in Los Angeles. In February 2025, he joined the Business Litigation practice group of King & Spalding as a partner in its Los Angeles office.

== Notable decisions ==
- Watford authored the decision of the Ninth Circuit's en banc decision in City of Los Angeles v. Patel (2014). In that case, the court struck down, 7–4, a Los Angeles city ordinance authorizing police to conduct surprise inspections of hotel and motel guest registries without obtaining the owners' consent or a search warrant. Watford, writing for the court, held that the ordinance violated the Fourth Amendment. The following year, the U.S. Supreme Court affirmed the decision in a 5–4 vote.
- On November 15, 2021, Watford dissented when a 2–1 panel on the Ninth Circuit dismissed a wrongful death lawsuit filed by the son of a woman who died in police custody.

== Supreme Court consideration ==
In late 2012, multiple national news organizations mentioned Watford as a possible nominee to the Supreme Court of the United States during Barack Obama's second term. Following Justice Antonin Scalia's passing in 2016, Watford interviewed with President Obama in consideration for the vacancy.

== Selected publications ==
- Watford, Paul J.; Chen, Richard C.; Basile, Marco (December 2017). "Crafting Precedent". Harvard Law Review. 131 (2): 543–580.
- Watford, Paul J. (2014). "Screws v. United States and the Birth of Federal Civil Rights Enforcement". Marquette Law Review. 98 (1): 465–486.
- Watford, Paul (1993). "Contractual Liability in Intellectual Property Disputes—A Case Study: Buchwald v. Paramount Pictures Corp.". Columbia-VLA Journal of Law & the Arts. 18 (3–4): 269–290.

== See also ==
- Barack Obama Supreme Court candidates
- Joe Biden Supreme Court candidates
- List of African-American federal judges
- List of African-American jurists
- List of law clerks for the sixth seat of the Supreme Court of the United States

Legal offices
Preceded by Pamela Ann Rymer	Judge of the United States Court of Appeals for the Ninth Circuit; 2012–2023	Succeeded by Ana de Alba
