= Peter P. Jurchak =

American lawyer

- Born: February 22, 1900
- Died: December 20, 1948 (aged 48)
- Education: Dickinson Law School
- Occupation: Lawyer

Peter P. Jurchak (February 22, 1900 – December 20, 1948) was a well-known and respected Slovak attorney who made great strides in the equal representation of Slovak immigrants and coal miners in Northeastern Pennsylvania during the first half of the twentieth century, as well as wrote several books on the advancement of the Slovak people in America.

== Early life ==
Peter was the oldest of twelve children, born on February 22, 1900, in Anita, Pennsylvania. He was endowed with a brilliant mind and strength of character, as well as a fervent warmth for his fellow human beings. His childhood was a busy one, helping to keep his many brothers and sisters in tow while living in a small house. It was a happy but simple life, full of the usual excitements and components of being young. At one point he saved his younger sister Ann from drowning. Peter attended the parochial school of St. Adrian's Church in Delancey, where he excelled at every subject. He eventually took up the violin, which started a long trend of musicians in the family. His musicianship was often requested for church functions, and it soon became standard for him to play at events such as the Christmas Eve celebration at St. Adrian's.

== The coal mines ==
After graduation from high school at the age of 16, Jurchak went to work in the coal mines alongside his father. World War I was currently going on at the time, but Peter was exempt from the draft due to his employment in the coal mines; the vital coal industry was felt to be an alternative contribution to the war effort. His dad gave up his job as a motorman so that he could work with Jurchak, and they became a highly productive team. As the family grew, Jurchak and his father would joke that each new child meant filling another car of coal each day to meet the increased costs of living at home.

== College ==
After working in the mines for several years, he soon realized that his future was limited there. Peter soon developed an interest in becoming a lawyer, and began studying during his lunch breaks in the mines to prepare for the college equivalency and law school entrance exam. It was a familiar sight to see Peter Jurchak sneaking away from his co-workers at lunch, tucking himself in a manhole (a little nook on the side of the gangway where men stood to let the mine cars go by) and pulling out a book to read. The years of determination paid off when Peter passed the exam in Pittsburgh in July 1921, subsequently being admitted to Dickinson Law School in Carlisle. The family budget was tight, but education was their first priority, so everyone struggled to meet the tuition costs.

== Career in law ==
His college years passed quickly, and after graduation Peter was ready to set up his own law practice. It was 1925, and in his attempt to get established as a lawyer he secured a position as legal counsel for the United Mine Workers in District 2. They were headquartered in Johnstown, Pennsylvania, so he would start here. His sister, Mary, had just finished secretarial training in Detroit, so he asked her to help him in his new venture. They worked in Johnstown for a year, putting in long hours. Once they became reasonably established, they asked their family to come join them in Johnstown. The law practice continued to flourish, with Peter working hard and determinedly to help miners and occasionally their widows to gain their hard-earned compensation in cases of injury or death. Long lines of miners could be seen, waiting for him to help them with their legal troubles. Before long, Peter received so much business that he had to ask other lawyers for help. Among these was George Delansey, who was a student one year behind him at Dickinson. Peter and Mary worked side by side in their law office at 508 U.S. Bank Building in Johnstown for many years. In 1928, Peter tried his hand at politics. The miners pleaded with him to run for District Attorney of Cambria County. They felt that he could be the sympathetic ear they needed in the county government.

== The battle for district attorney ==
It was an uphill battle. Despite his fine reputation as a lawyer, Peter was also a Slovak and the son of immigrants, an unwelcome badge in the 1920s. Many people begrudged the Slavic people, accusing them of taking jobs away from Native Americans. One memory of Mary's is when Peter approached the incumbent district attorney (DA) to negotiate an alternative position as assistant DA in place of a drawn-out election battle. The DA responded: "A Slovak will never be given an appointment as assistant District Attorney!" In spite of the strong backing of the coal miners, Peter lost the election. This caused him to reassess his goals and resulted in a change of direction. During this time, he had also become active as legal counsel for the Ladies Pennsylvania Slovak Union. As their organization grew, they encouraged Peter to move to Wilkes-Barre, Pennsylvania, to be nearer to their home office. The political climate was different in Luzerne County; prejudice against Slavs was less severe. In fact, the Slovak organizations had significant political clout. So it was in early 1929 that Peter pulled up stakes in Johnstown, packed his law books, and moved nearly 200 miles away.

== Career in Wilkes-Barre ==
Peter became well known in Wilkes-Barre and eventually met his wife through a member of one of the Slovak fraternal organizations he was involved with there. He and Scholastica "Laska" Gaydosh were married on December 29, 1931. His family kept him busy, but he always had time to help others. He became involved in many civic activities, and during the course of his career served as legal counsel for many Slovak fraternal organizations, as well as special attorney general for the State Liquor Control Board.

Peter was a prolific writer, publishing many articles in a variety of publications. He wrote three books: The Club Leader's Handbook, The Slovaks (a history of the Slovak people) and Slovak Proverbs and Sayings, as well as several booklets. The first and probably most memorable booklet was entitled Steps to Leadership. It was during these years as an author that Peter decided to change the spelling of his last name to Yurchak so that it would be easier to pronounce. This became his pen name, and his wife and sons later adopted the same spelling. Remembering his early political experiences in Johnstown, Peter was a staunch ally of his fellow Slovaks and constantly championed their efforts to brighten their image.

== Family ==
Peter married Scholastica "Laska" Gaydosh (August 24, 1910 – March 31, 2007), a native of Wheeling, West Virginia, on 29 Dec 1931. Laska graduated from West Virginia University in 1930 with a B.A. in Home Economics.

The couple had three sons, Peter M. Yurchak, (December 21, 1932 – July 30, 2007), Paul Nicholas Yurchak, (December 18, 1934 – August 12, 1999), and Anthony Michael Yurchak (February 11, 1936 – May 10, 2017).

Oldest son Peter graduated from the University of Pennsylvania in 1953 and from Harvard Medical School in 1957, and became a cardiologist in Boston.

Middle son Paul graduated from Villanova University in 1958 and became a career officer in the US Army, retiring as a lieutenant colonel. He spent four and a half years in Vietnam, where he won a Silver Star and numerous other decorations.

Youngest son Anthony earned a BS, magna cum laude, from Notre Dame in 1957, followed by an MD from University of Pennsylvania School of Medicine in 1961. He became an allergist and immunologist in Buffalo, New York.

== Death ==
Peter P. Jurchak died prematurely on December 20, 1948, only days before his 17th wedding anniversary. Doctors from his wife's family were attending him throughout his stay. Laska's younger brother Dr. Francis Gaydosh flew to Wilkes-Barre from Wheeling on first learning of his brother-in-law's illness. Laska's father, Dr. Michael Gaydosh Sr., her other brother Dr. Michael Gaydosh Jr., and her older sister Dr. Anne Hughes and her husband Dr. Boland Hughes were all at Peter's bedside when he died.

It was a serious loss to the Slovak cause. He was only 48 years old. There was an outpouring of affection from all walks of life that flooded the Yurchak home, and included among many messages of condolence was a stirring tribute from Pope Pius XII. Because of his vigorous fight for the independence of Slovakia in the post-war years, the Slovak consul in Washington sent a representative to Peter's funeral. In Slovak custom, the diplomat placed a handful of earth brought from Slovakia and some Slovak coins on Peter's casket—a tribute to his strong heritage.

== Publications ==
- The Slovaks: Their History and Traditions. 1946. Whiting IN: John J Lach / Obrana Press.
- Slovak Proverbs & Sayings. 1947. Scranton, PA: Obrana Press.
