= Loyola Law School =

Catholic law school in Los Angeles, California

Coordinates: 34°02′55″N 118°16′15″W

- Motto: Ad maiorem Dei gloriam – Tua Luce Dirige (For the greater glory of God – direct us by thy light)
- Parent school: Loyola Marymount University
- Established: 1920 (1865)
- School type: Private, Roman Catholic
- Parent endowment: $611.3 million (2022)
- Dean: Brietta R. Clark
- Location: Los Angeles, California, United States
- Enrollment: 1000
- Faculty: 78 full-time, 120 part-time
- USNWR ranking: 71st (tie) (2025)
- Bar pass rate: 80% (July 2025 1st time takers)
- Website: www.lls.edu
- ABA profile: Standard 509 Report

Loyola Law School is the law school of Loyola Marymount University, a private Jesuit university in Los Angeles, California. Loyola was established in 1920.

== Academics ==
Degrees offered include the Juris Doctor (JD); Master of Science in Legal Studies (MLS); Master of Laws (LLM); Master of Laws in Taxation; and Juris Doctor/Master of Business Administration (JD/MBA). Loyola has been an American Bar Association (ABA) approved law school since 1935. It is a member of the Association of American Law Schools (AALS).

Loyola Law School's campus is located just west of downtown Los Angeles. It consists of an open central plaza surrounded by several contemporary buildings designed by Frank Gehry. Its library has a collection of nearly 560,000 volumes.

In fall 2022, Loyola’s faculty restructured the Evening Program to feature a hybrid schedule that requires an on-campus commitment of one night a week and one night remotely.

=== Rankings ===
U.S. News & World Report ranked Loyola Law School 71st out of 145 in 2025.

== Bar passage rate ==
Loyola's first-time takers of the July 2025 California Bar Exam passed at a rate of 80.4%, below the 84.4% average rate for all ABA-approved law schools.

== Post-graduation employment ==
Loyola's required disclosures for the class of 2024 showed 95% were employed in 2024, with 88% in jobs requiring bar admission.

ABA employment for the Class of 2024
Employment Status	Percentage
Employed – Bar Passage Required	87.8%
Employed – J.D. Advantage	5.4%
Employed – Professional Position	0.6%
Employed – Non-Professional Position	0%
Employed – Law School/University funded	1.5%
Pursuing Graduate Degree Full Time	0%
Unemployed – Start Date Deferred	0.3%
Unemployed – Not Seeking	0.6%
Unemployed – Seeking	2.7%
Employment Status Unknown	1.2%
Total of 320 graduates

== Costs ==
Total tuition and fees for the 2025-26 academic year are $71,386. The total cost of attendance (indicating the cost of tuition, fees, and living expenses) at Loyola Law School for the 2025-26 academic year is $118,075.

== Controversies ==
In April 2024, Loyola Law School was the subject of controversy when a meeting of the Jewish Law Students Association was disrupted by antisemitic and racialized slurs. A professor was reportedly called a "Nazi," and attendees stated they heard other antisemitic and racialized epithets. The Daily Journal reports: "The school's response to the protest and its aftermath has been muted and disappointing, according to some people at the school and prominent alumni."

The U.S. Department of Education has opened a federal investigation into allegations of race- and religion-based harassment on campus.

In March 2022, a Los Angeles Times investigation revealed that Loyola Law School had received approximately $1.4 million from insurance settlements intended to compensate descendants of Armenian genocide victims and support Armenian charitable organizations. Although the law school acknowledged receiving $1.4 million, attorneys administering the settlements had disclosed only $400,000 in donations to Loyola in lists submitted to the federal court. The investigation also found that a $350,000 donation identified in court documents as intended for the Armenian General Benevolent Union was instead transferred to Loyola under an arrangement coordinated in advance by attorneys involved in the settlements. The funds helped establish and operate Loyola's Center for the Study of Law and Genocide. Two attorneys involved in the settlements, Mark Geragos and Brian Kabateck, were Loyola alumni, and Kabateck served as chair of the law school's board of directors and as a trustee of Loyola Marymount University. Following the investigation and calls for accountability from lawmakers, the State Bar of California announced on September 27, 2022, that it had opened investigations into Geragos and Kabateck concerning their handling of the Armenian genocide insurance settlement funds.

== Programs and clinics ==
=== Loyola's clinics ===
Loyola Law School's 21 clinics include:

- Center for Conflict Resolution, which provides mediation, conciliation, and facilitation services, as well as conflict resolution training.
- Center for Juvenile Law and Policy, serves as a holistic law firm representing youths in juvenile court. A small group of students each year are selected for a year-long clinic, receiving trial advocacy and procedure training from its staff of attorneys and social workers. The CJLP includes the Juvenile Justice Clinic, the Juvenile Innocence & Fair Sentencing Clinic and the Youth Justice Education Clinic. On Nov. 20, 2017, the Everychild Foundation announced that the CJLP was awarded its 2017 annual $1 million competitive grant to develop a program to train law students to represent foster youth involved in both dependency and delinquency courts.
- Loyola's International Human Rights Clinic pursues human rights claims by citizens against countries, tribunals and more. Its work has included seeking to establish domestic violence as cause for refugee status. The clinic has more than two dozen matters pending before regional and international courts and tribunals.
- The Loyola Immigrant Justice Clinic has conducted more than 10,000 client consultations since its 2012 client-intake event.
- In Loyola's Street Law Teaching Practicum, a legal non-profit that helps clients extricate themselves from abusive relationships, students teach survivors of domestic violence about essential legal skills useful to rebuilding their lives.
- The Workers' Rights Clinic partners Loyola students with workers' rights lawyers from Asian Americans Advancing Justice-Los Angeles (AAJLA) and the Wage Justice Center to provide holistic services to low-wage immigrant workers in the areas of wage theft, employment discrimination, labor trafficking and retaliation

=== Other programs ===
- Civil Justice Program, which convenes periodic conferences, seminars, and presentations, promotes and publishes scholarly research, and initiates cross-disciplinary projects.
- Cybersecurity & Data Privacy Law program, an interdisciplinary program run jointly with LMU's Seaver College of Science & Engineering, offers both lawyers and non-lawyers advanced skills training in compliance, incident response, risk assessment and more. Media reports have noted that the program will draw on the school's traditional strengths in intellectual property, digital privacy and cybercrime, as well as its connections to nearby Silicon Beach. The program is the first of its kind on the west coast.
- Entertainment Law Practicum, which provides students with hands-on experience in the entertainment industry while earning units toward their degree.
- Journalist Law School, providing fellowships to journalists for a legal study practicum. The program has been cited as an important way for journalists to grow vital skills.
- The Master of Science in Legal Studies is a program for working professionals to develop critical thinking and essential legal skills. There are six specializations: Corporate Law, Criminal Justice, Cybersecurity & Data Privacy, Entertainment Law, Intellectual Property and International Business Law.
- Public Interest Law Foundation (PILF), a student-run organization focused on getting students involved in public interest causes and raising money for public interest grants.

=== Law reviews ===
Loyola currently has three student-run and edited law reviews:

- Loyola of Los Angeles Law Review is a publication devoted to the advancement of legal scholarship. Publishing articles on all legal topics, the Review seeks to identify and advance new legal research by scholars, practitioners, and students. Authors have included former President Jimmy Carter and NPR Legal Affairs Nina Totenberg. The Loyola of Los Angeles Law Review celebrated its 50th anniversary in the 2017–18 academic year.
- Loyola of Los Angeles International & Comparative Law Review is dedicated to the advancement of legal scholarship in the field of international law In April 2008, ILR held a symposium entitled Transformation in Iraq: From Ending a Modern War to Creating a Modern Peace. Using Iraq as a test case, the symposium sought to assess the legitimacy and viability of modern occupation law against contemporary realities and recent developments in moral and political thought.
- Loyola of Los Angeles Entertainment Law Review publishes scholarly articles which frequently cover topics in constitutional law, sports law, intellectual property rights, communications regulation, antitrust law, employment law, contract law, corporate law, as well as computer and Internet law. ELR has also featured symposia on such topics as independent filmmaking, international rights of publicity, and the use of law and identity to script cultural production.

=== Trial advocacy and moot court ===
Loyola's trial advocacy and moot court programs are ranked No. 7 nationally by U.S. News & World Report's "2025 Best Graduate Schools" rankings.

== Notable people ==
=== Faculty ===
==== Current faculty ====
- Simona Grossi, Professor and civil procedure expert
- Allan Ides, Professor (Loyola Law alumnus who served as U.S. Supreme Court Clerk)
- Justin Hughes, Professor, former senior advisor to the Under Secretary of Commerce in the Obama Administration
- Laurie Levenson, criminal law professor and media commentator
- Jessica Levinson, Professor, President, LA Ethics Commission
- Justin Levitt, Professor, former deputy assistant attorney general in the U.S. Justice Department, Civil Rights Division
- Yxta Maya Murray, legal scholar and novelist
- Cesare P.R. Romano, international law expert and human rights litigator

==== Former faculty ====
- Nina Appel, legal scholar and first female dean
- Richard L. Hasen, election law expert
- Terry J. Hatter Jr., Senior United States district judge of the United States District Court for the Central District of California.
- Gerald Uelmen, part of the "dream team" assembled to defend O. J. Simpson

=== Staff ===
==== Former staff ====
- Gotabaya Rajapaksa, 8th President of Sri Lanka, who formerly worked at Loyola Law as a systems integrator and Unix Solaris administrator.

== See also ==
- Law school rankings in the United States
- List of law schools in the United States
