= Katherine Stone (academic) =

American lawyer and legal scholar

- Occupations: Legal scholar; lawyer
- Awards: Guggenheim Fellowship (2008)

Academic background
- Education: Harvard University (BA); Harvard Law School (JD)

Academic work
- Sub-discipline: United States labor law
- Institutions: Benjamin N. Cardozo School of Law; Cornell Law School; UCLA School of Law

Katherine Van Wezel Stone is an American legal scholar. Originally working as a lawyer in New York City, she worked as a law professor at the Benjamin N. Cardozo School of Law and Cornell Law School before moving to the UCLA School of Law, where she became the Arjay and Frances Fearing Miller Distinguished Professor of Law. A 2008 Guggenheim Fellow, she specializes in United States labor law and has won the Michael Harrington Award for her book From Widgets to Digits: Employment Regulation for the Changing Workplace (2004).

== Biography ==
Stone obtained a BA magna cum laude from Harvard University in 1970 and a JD cum laude from Harvard Law School in 1979, and authored the Oil, Chemical and Atomic Workers International Union's Handbook for OCAW Women (1973). She was a practicing lawyer for the New York City law firms Cohen, Weiss & Simon from 1979 to 1981 and Rabinowitz, Boudin, Standard, Krinsky & Lieberman from 1981 to 1984.

In 1984, Stone became a professor of law at Yeshiva University's Benjamin N. Cardozo School of Law. After serving as a visiting professor at the University of Chicago Law School (1990-1991), she left Yeshiva to become a Professor of Law at Cornell Law School in 1992. She was also Anne Evans Estabrook Professor of Dispute Resolution at the New York State School of Industrial and Labor Relations. While at Cornell, she was also a visiting professor at Stanford Law School (1997) and Yale Law School (1999-2000). In 2004, she joined the faculty of the UCLA School of Law; she was eventually appointed the Arjay and Frances Fearing Miller Distinguished Professor of Law.

Stone specializes in United States labor law. She won the American Political Science Association's 2005 Michael Harrington Award for her 2004 book From Widgets to Digits: Employment Regulation for the Changing Workplace. In 2008, she was awarded a Guggenheim Fellowship in Law, and she was a 2008-2009 Russell Sage Foundation Fellow. She co-edited the volumes Rethinking Comparative Labor Law: Bridging the Past and the Future (2007) and Rethinking Workplace Regulation: Beyond the Standard Contract of Employment (2013). (Note: Reviews of this book:) She was author of Globalization and Labor Standards Annotated Bibliography: An Essential Research Tool (2014). She is founder of the Globalization and Labor Standards Bibliographic Archive and Database, an abstract database specializing in international labor. Outside of labor law, she authored Private Justice: Alternative Dispute Resolution and the Law (2000) and Arbitration Law (2021).

Stone's grandfather was Sarasota philanthropist Lewis Van Wezel. As of 2022, she lives in Los Angeles.

== Works ==
- Handbook for OCAW Women (1973)
- The Post-War Paradigm in American Labor Law (1983)
- Private Justice: Alternative Dispute Resolution and the Law (2000)
- From Widgets to Digits: Employment Regulation for the Changing Workplace (2004) (Note: Reviews of this book:)
- (ed. with Benjamin Aaron) Rethinking Comparative Labor Law: Bridging the Past and the Future (2007)
- (ed. with Harry Arthurs) Rethinking Workplace Regulation: Beyond the Standard Contract of Employment (2013)
- Globalization and Labor Standards Annotated Bibliography: An Essential Research Tool (2014)
- Arbitration Law (2021)
