= Munger, Tolles & Olson =

California law firm

Munger, Tolles & Olson LLP
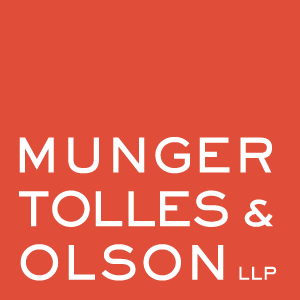
- Headquarters: California Plaza; Los Angeles, California
- No. of offices: 3
- No. of attorneys: 200 (2025)
- Major practice areas: Litigation, Appeals, White Collar and Investigations, Antitrust, Securities, Corporate, Tax, Real Estate, Bankruptcy, Labor and Employment, Environmental
- Key people: Brad Brian, Firm Chair; Martin Estrada, Co-managing partner; Daniel Levin, Co-managing partner
- Revenue: $376 million (2024)
- Profit per equity partner: $3.1 million (2024)
- Date founded: February 1, 1962
- Founder: Charlie Munger, Roy Tolles, Carla and Rod Hills, Dick Esbenshade, Fred Warder Jr.
- Company type: Limited liability partnership
- Website: https://www.mto.com

Munger, Tolles, & Olson LLP (MTO) is an American law firm founded in 1962 with offices in Los Angeles, San Francisco, and Washington D.C. The firm is known for handling litigation and corporate matters across multiple industries, including entertainment, technology, energy, healthcare, and financial services.

As of 2025, MTO employed approximately 200 attorneys across its three offices. It is considered one of the most prestigious and selective law firms in the US.

== History ==
Munger, Tolles & Hills was established in Downtown Los Angeles' Tishman Building on February 1, 1962. The firm was founded by three former partners from Musick, Peeler & Garrett: Charlie Munger, E. Leroy Tolles, and Roderick M. Hills.

The founding group included two additional Musick attorneys, Richard Esbenshade and Frederick B. Warder Jr. as well as Carla Anderson Hills, who was serving as an assistant U.S. attorney at the time and was married to Roderick Hills. James T. Wood, a sole practitioner with connections to the Hills family, also joined the founding team.

In 1965, Charles Munger departed the firm to focus on investment management, forming a partnership with Warren Buffett and later becoming vice chairman of Berkshire Hathaway, which remained a client of the firm. The addition of Charles E. Rickershauser Jr., a former clerk to Supreme Court Justice William O. Douglas, strengthened the firm's corporate practice and led to its renaming as Munger, Tolles, Hills & Rickershauser. Ronald Olson joined as an associate in 1968 and was elevated to partner in 1970.

MTO expanded and opened an office in San Francisco in 1991. In 2016, the firm employed former Solicitor General of the United States Donald B. Verrilli Jr. to establish its Washington, D.C. office.

In 2019, the MTO underwent a leadership transition, appointing Malcolm Heinicke and Hailyn Chen as co-managing partners, succeeding Brad Brian and Sandra Seville-Jones. Brian was named as firm chair. At the time of her election, Chen was only the second Asian woman to assume a leadership position at a major law firm. Malcolm and Hailyn served as co-managing partners from 2019-2025. Former U.S. Attorneys and veteran firm partners Martin Estrada and Daniel Levin became the firm's new co-managing partners in November 2025.

== Legal practice ==
MTO has represented various clients in litigation and corporate transactions. The firm's client portfolio includes major corporations across various sectors, such as technology (Google, Intel), entertainment (The Walt Disney Company), financial services (Bank of America, Fortress Investment Group), transportation (BNSF Railway), utilities (Pacific Gas & Electric), and conglomerates (Berkshire Hathaway).

=== Recognition ===
MTO has appeared on The American Lawyer's A-List rankings multiple times between 2008 and 2025, including ranking first by the publication for 2008, 2009, 2010, 2013, 2017, 2019, 2020, 2022, 2023, 2024, and 2025.

The American Lawyer jointly named MTO Law Firm of the Year in 2025, among eight firms, four of which were honored for successful challenges to executive orders, and four others, including MTO, for legal representations of those firms.

== Lawyers ==
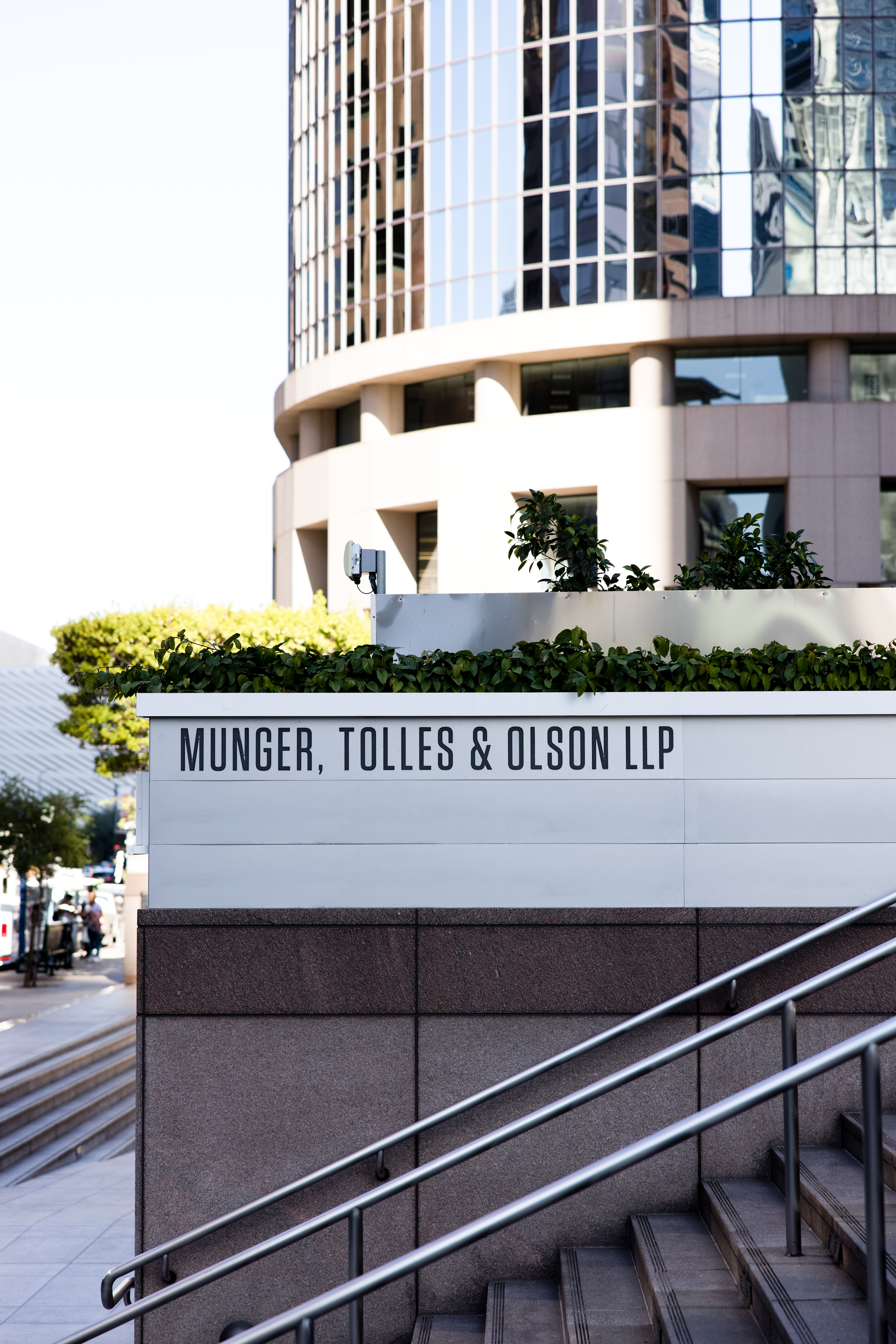
MTO Office 2023

=== Attorneys ===
- Ginger Anders, a former Deputy U.S. Assistant Attorney General.
- E. Martin Estrada, former U.S. Attorney
- Ronald Olson, a director of Berkshire Hathaway.
- Donald B. Verrilli Jr., former U.S. Solicitor General.

=== Alumni ===
- Nancy Bekavac, the first female president of Scripps College.
- Alan Bersin, former United States Attorney for the Southern District of California.
- Jeffrey L. Bleich, former Special Counsel to President Barack Obama and United States Ambassador to Australia.
- Daniel A. Bress, Judge on the U.S. Court of Appeals for the Ninth Circuit.
- Daniel J. Calabretta, Judge on the U.S. District Court for the Eastern District of California.
- Daniel P. Collins, Judge on the United States Court of Appeals for the Ninth Circuit.
- Robert Denham, former CEO of Salomon Brothers and current chairman of the MacArthur Foundation.
- John Frank, Vice Chairman of Oaktree.
- Michelle Friedland, Judge on the United States Court of Appeals for the Ninth Circuit.
- Joshua P. Groban, Associate Justice on the California Supreme Court.
- Carla Anderson Hills, former U.S. Trade Representative and former Secretary of Health and Human Services.
- Roderick Hills, former White House Counsel and Chairman of the U.S. Securities and Exchange Commission (SEC).
- Diane M. Johnsen, Judge on the Arizona Court of Appeals, Division One.
- Brett Kavanaugh, Associate Justice of the Supreme Court of the United States (1990).
- Ro Khanna, Member of the U.S. House of Representatives
- Leondra Kruger, Justice of the California Supreme Court.
- Carolyn Kuhl, judge on the Superior Court of California for the County of Los Angeles and former Deputy Solicitor General at the Department of Justice.
- Ted Lieu, Congressman representing the 36th District of California.
- Felicia Marcus, Chairman of California State Water Resources Control Board.
- Vilma Socorro Martínez, United States Ambassador to Argentina and past president of the Mexican American Legal Defense and Educational Fund (MALDEF).
- Charles Munger, vice chairman of Berkshire Hathaway.
- Sarala Nagala, former Judge on the U.S. District Court for the District of Connecticut.
- John B. Owens, Judge on the United States Court of Appeals for the Ninth Circuit.
- Gabriel P. Sanchez, Judge on the U.S. Court of Appeals for the Ninth Circuit.
- Usha Vance, Second Lady of the United States.
- Paul J. Watford, Judge on the United States Court of Appeals for the Ninth Circuit.
- Patrick Woolley, Beck, Redden & Secrest Professor of Law at the University of Texas School of Law.

== See also ==
- List of law firms
- White-shoe firm
