= Allan Ides =

American lawyer and law professor (born 1949)

Allan Ides (born 1949) is an American lawyer, the Christopher N. May Professor in the Loyola Law School of Loyola Marymount University, Los Angeles, California and was a visiting professor at the University of Southern California, Gould School of Law, for Fall 2011. From 1989 through 1997, Ides was a faculty member at Washington and Lee University School of Law.

After graduating from Loyola Law School, Ides clerked for U.S. Supreme Court Justice Byron White from 1980 to 1981, and he argued for the defendant in the Supreme Court case United States v. Owens (484 US 554) on rules of evidence concerning memory-impaired witnesses.

Ides has co-authored Civil Procedure: Cases and Problems and Examples & Explanations: Constitutional Law.

== See also ==
- List of law clerks for the sixth seat of the Supreme Court of the United States
