= Martin S. Flaherty =

American legal scholar

Martin S. Flaherty (born December 15, 1958) is a legal scholar and international human rights activist. Flaherty is a law professor in New York City and a longtime professor of international affairs at Princeton University. He has also pursued human rights advocacy with a range of organizations, including Human Rights First, the Leitner Center on International Law and Justice, the New York City Bar Association, and the UN, on human rights missions to Northern Ireland, Turkey, Hong Kong, China, Mexico, Kenya, Romania, and the United States, among others. His work focuses on the independence of lawyers and judges.

== Education and clerkships ==
Flaherty graduated from Delbarton School in Morristown, New Jersey, in 1977. He then entered Princeton University, where he received a B.A. and graduated summa cum laude in history (1981). Flaherty also attended Yale University, pursuing graduate studies in early American history under the guidance of Edmund. S. Morgan, and received an M.A. (1982) and M.Phil., with distinction (1987), in history. While at Yale, Flaherty spent a year at Trinity College Dublin on an ITT/Fulbright Fellowship. Flaherty also holds a J.D. (1988) from Columbia Law School, where he was Book Reviews and Articles Editor on the Columbia Law Review.

== Career ==
Flaherty is the Leitner Family Professor of International Human Rights Law in New York, where he is the Founding Co-Director (with Professor Tracy Higgins) of the Leitner Center for International Law and Justice. He is also a longtime Visiting Professor at the School of Public and International Affairs at Princeton. In addition, Flaherty has taught at Columbia Law School, Barnard College; China University of Law and Political Science and the National Judges College, both in Beijing; Queens University Belfast, Sungkyunkwan University, St. John’s School of Law, and New York Law School, among others.

=== Leitner Center ===
With Tracy Higgins, Flaherty in 1997 founded the Crowley Program in International Human rights, which ten years later expanded at the Leitner Center on International Law and Justice. Through the Leitner Center, Flaherty led numerous human rights investigations. The Leitner Center has become a human rights program network, encompassing the Crowley Program in International Human Rights, Asia Law and Justice Center, Sustainable Development Law Initiative, the Walter Leitner Human Rights Clinic, the International Law and Development in Africa Clinic, the Corporate Social Responsibility Program, the Vivian Leitner Global South LLM Student Program, and others.
