= Cornelia Pillard =

American federal judge (born 1961)

Nina Pillard
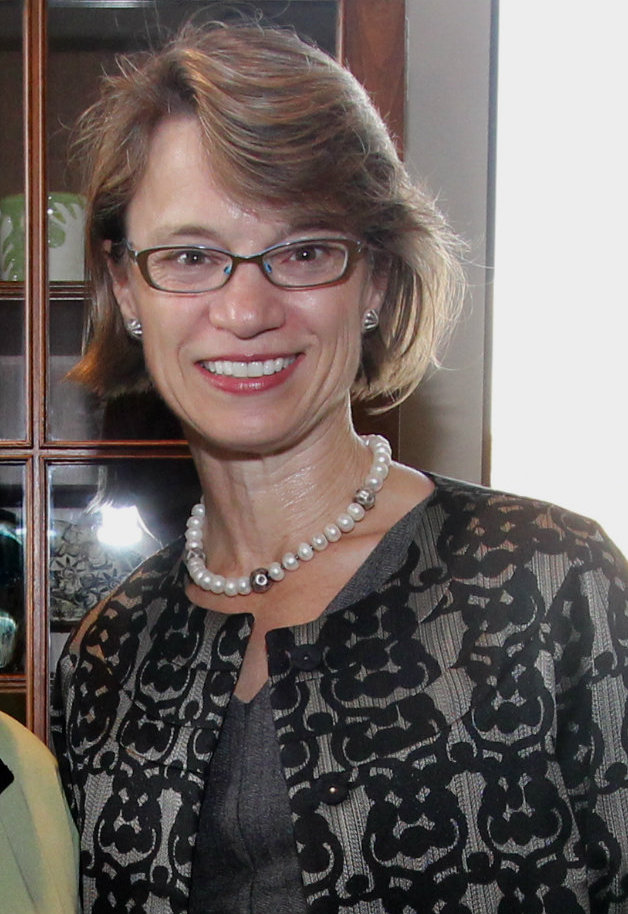

Judge of the United States Court of Appeals for the District of Columbia Circuit
- Incumbent
- Assumed office December 17, 2013
- Appointed by: Barack Obama
- Preceded by: Douglas H. Ginsburg

Personal details
- Born: Cornelia Thayer Livingston Pillard; 1961 (age 64–65) Cambridge, Massachusetts, U.S.
- Spouse: David D. Cole
- Children: 2
- Education: Yale University (BA); Harvard University (JD)

Cornelia Thayer Livingston Pillard (born 1961), known professionally as Nina Pillard, is an American lawyer and jurist serving since 2013 as a U.S. circuit judge of the United States Court of Appeals for the District of Columbia Circuit. Before becoming a judge, Pillard was a law professor at Georgetown University.

Pillard served as a Deputy Assistant Attorney General and Assistant to the United States Solicitor General. At the time of her confirmation to the federal bench, Pillard was a prominent U.S. Supreme Court advocate in the United States, having argued nine cases and briefed more than 25 cases before the Court.

Pillard's nomination to the D.C. Circuit, along with the nominations of Robert L. Wilkins and Patricia Millett, ultimately became central to the debate over the use of the filibuster in the United States Senate, leading to the controversial use of the nuclear option to bring it to the floor for a vote. She was confirmed by a 51–44 vote, with her detractors labeling her as one of the most liberal nominees to the federal bench in decades. Pillard has been compared to Ruth Bader Ginsburg for her civil rights advocacy, and has been mentioned as a possible Supreme Court nominee.

== Early life and education ==
Pillard was born in 1961, in Cambridge, Massachusetts. Her father, Richard Pillard, was a professor of psychiatry at Boston University and the first openly gay psychiatrist in the United States.

After graduating from the Commonwealth School in 1978, Pillard studied history at Yale University. She graduated in 1983 with a Bachelor of Arts, magna cum laude. From 1983 to 1984, Pillard was a researcher and office assistant in the Beijing office of the Asia bureau of Newsday. She then attended Harvard Law School, where she was an editor of the Harvard Law Review. She graduated in 1987 with a Juris Doctor, magna cum laude.

== Professional career ==
Pillard began her legal career in 1987 as a law clerk for Judge Louis H. Pollak of the United States District Court for the Eastern District of Pennsylvania. Pollak was a former dean of both Yale and Penn Law Schools.

After her clerkship, Pillard was a lawyer for the NAACP Legal Defense and Educational Fund, in New York City and Washington, D.C., from 1988 to 1994.

In 1994, Pillard joined the Office of the Solicitor General of the United States, where she briefed and argued civil and criminal cases on behalf of the federal government before the U.S. Supreme Court. She joined the tenure-track faculty at Georgetown Law in 1997.

In 1998, Pillard was named Deputy Assistant Attorney General for the U.S. Department of Justice's Office of Legal Counsel. That office provides authoritative legal advice to the President and all the Executive Branch agencies, including review of all executive orders and orders of the Attorney General.

Pillard returned to Georgetown Law in 2000, where she received tenure. Pillard has taught more than a dozen different courses and seminars, and frequently teaches the core civil procedure and constitutional law courses. Pillard also served as faculty director of Georgetown Law's Supreme Court Institute, a public service program that provides free assistance to attorneys preparing for arguments before the Supreme Court on a first-come, first-served basis. In the 2012 term, the program held moot courts for counsel in 100% of cases argued before the Court.

== Boards and committees ==
Pillard supports private settlement of legal disputes through negotiation, mediation and arbitration. She serves on the Executive Committee of the board of directors of the American Arbitration Association, and has been a board member there since 2005.

Pillard served as Chair and an active reader on an American Bar Association Reading Committee that evaluated all of the writings of Supreme Court nominee Samuel Alito for the ABA Standing Committee on the Federal Judiciary. The committee found Alito "well qualified" to sit on the U.S. Supreme Court.

== Supreme Court practice ==
Pillard has argued nine cases and briefed more than twenty-five cases before the U.S. Supreme Court, making her one of the nation's most prominent Supreme Court advocates. Some of her landmark victories are now staples of law school textbooks.

In the landmark case United States v. Virginia (1996), Pillard wrote the Solicitor General's brief challenging the men-only admissions policy of the Virginia Military Institute (VMI). In a 7-1 decision, the Court held that VMI's exclusion of women violated the Equal Protection Clause of the United States Constitution, and that the new, separate and different Virginia Women's Institute for Leadership did not remedy the violation.

While a member of the Georgetown Law faculty, Pillard successfully defended the Family and Medical Leave Act (FMLA) against constitutional challenge in another landmark case, Nevada Department of Human Resources v. Hibbs (2003). Pillard represented William Hibbs, a state employee who was fired when he sought to take unpaid leave to care for his injured wife under the FMLA. Pillard, together with the United States Justice Department during the administration of President George W. Bush, which intervened to defend the law, argued that state employees should be able to rely on the FMLA. In a decision by then-Chief Justice Rehnquist, the Court ruled for Hibbs and upheld the FMLA's application to state employees as a valid exercise of Congress' constitutional powers.

Representing the United States in Ornelas v. United States (1996), Pillard won a significant victory for law enforcement, leading to clearer legal guidance to federal, state, and local officials conducting searches and seizures. In an opinion by then-Chief Justice Rehnquist, the Court held that independent review of probable cause determinations by appellate courts was necessary to ensure the development and consistent application of search and seizure rules.

In other noteworthy cases representing the United States, Pillard sought robust "qualified immunity" protection of law enforcement personnel against lawsuits, shielding officials from the burdens of litigation and liability for reasonable decisions even where, in hindsight, they turned out to be wrong. She also successfully argued that the U.S. Constitution reserves the jury right in criminal cases to defendants charged with serious offenses.

== Federal judicial service ==
President Barack Obama nominates Pillard (center) and two others for the D.C. Circuit Court

In May 2013, the New York Times and the Washington Post reported that Pillard was under consideration by the Obama administration to fill one of three vacancies on the United States Court of Appeals for the District of Columbia Circuit.

On June 4, 2013, Obama nominated Pillard to serve as a United States Circuit Judge on the United States Court of Appeals for the District of Columbia Circuit, to the seat vacated by Judge Douglas H. Ginsburg, who assumed senior status on October 14, 2011. Her nomination immediately became controversial. According to ThinkProgress, conservatives attacked her as an extremist and radical feminist, noting that a paper she had authored analogized compelled maternity to "conscription," in objecting to her confirmation. On September 19, 2013, her nomination was reported to the floor by the Senate Judiciary Committee by a 10–8 vote, the vote falling along party lines.

On November 7, 2013, Senate Majority Leader Harry Reid moved to invoke cloture on Pillard's nomination, in an attempt to cut off a filibuster from Republican senators. On November 12, 2013, the Senate rejected the motion to invoke cloture by a 56–41 vote, with 1 senator voted "present".

After the Senate moved forward in November 2013 with a rules change eliminating the filibuster on federal appeals court nominees, the Senate on December 10, 2013, invoked cloture on Pillard’s nomination by a 56–42 vote. That paved the way for a final floor vote on Pillard's nomination. Shortly before 1 a.m. on December 12, 2013, the Senate confirmed Pillard by a 51–44 vote. On December 17, 2013, Pillard received her federal judicial commission.

=== Notable rulings ===
As a judge, Pillard extended the exclusionary rule to require police to knock-and-announce when executing an arrest warrant, over a dissent by Judge Karen L. Henderson. Judge Pillard joined Henderson when they denied a petition by Abd al-Rahim al-Nashiri to disqualify his military judges. When in Meshal v. Higgenbotham (2016) Judges Janice Rogers Brown and Brett Kavanaugh threw out a claim by an American that he had been disappeared by the FBI in a Kenyan black site, Judge Pillard dissented, arguing the court should just create a new implied cause of action. When Judge Pillard's panel found that the Patient Protection and Affordable Care Act did not violate the Constitution's Origination Clause in Sissel v. United States Department of Health & Human Services (2014), Judge Kavanaugh wrote a lengthy dissent from denial of an en banc rehearing.

== Personal life ==
Pillard is married to Georgetown law professor and current ACLU Legal Director David D. Cole and has two children, Sarah and Aidan Pillard.

== Selected scholarly works ==
- Pillard, Cornelia T.L.; Aleinikoff, T. Alexander (1998). "Skeptical Scrutiny of Plenary Power: Judicial and Executive Branch Decision Making in Miller v. Albright". The Supreme Court Review. 1998: 1–70. doi:10.1086/scr.1998.3109696.
- Pillard, Cornelia T.L. (1999). "Taking Fiction Seriously: The Strange Results of Public Officials' Liability Under Bivens". Georgetown Law Journal. 88 (1): 65–104.
- — (2005). "The Unfulfilled Promise of the Constitution in Executive Hands". Michigan Law Review. 103 (4): 676–758. JSTOR 30044443.
- — (2006). "Unitariness and Myopia: The Executive Branch, Legal Process, and Torture". Indiana Law Journal. 81 (4): 1297–1312.
- — (2007). "Our Other Reproductive Choices: Equality in Sex Education, Contraceptive Access, and Work-Family Policy". Emory Law Journal. 56 (4): 941–91.
- —; Mezey, Naomi (2012). "Against the New Maternalism". Michigan Journal of Gender & Law. 18 (2): 229–96.

== See also ==
- Barack Obama Supreme Court candidates

Legal offices
Preceded by Douglas H. Ginsburg	Judge of the United States Court of Appeals for the District of Columbia Circuit; 2013–present	Incumbent
