= Robert L. Wilkins =

American federal judge (born 1963)

Robert Wilkins
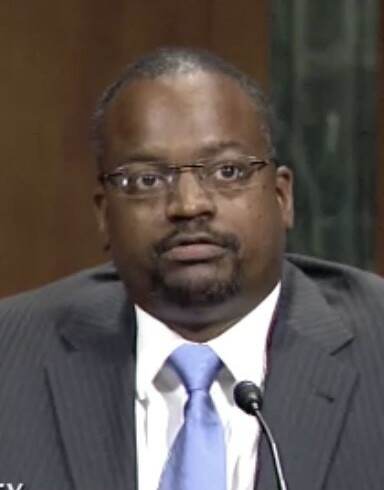

Judge of the United States Court of Appeals for the District of Columbia Circuit
- Incumbent
- Assumed office January 15, 2014
- Appointed by: Barack Obama
- Preceded by: David B. Sentelle

Judge of the United States District Court for the District of Columbia
- In office December 27, 2010 – January 24, 2014
- Appointed by: Barack Obama
- Preceded by: James Robertson
- Succeeded by: Randolph Moss

Personal details
- Born: Robert Leon Wilkins; October 2, 1963 (age 62) Muncie, Indiana, U.S.
- Spouse: Amina Long
- Children: 2
- Education: Rose-Hulman Institute of Technology (BS); Harvard University (JD)

Robert Leon Wilkins (born October 2, 1963) is an American lawyer and jurist serving as United States circuit judge of the United States Court of Appeals for the District of Columbia Circuit. He previously served as a judge of the United States District Court for the District of Columbia from 2010 to 2014.

Wilkins' 2013 nomination to the D.C. Circuit, along with the nominations of Patricia Millett and Nina Pillard, ultimately became central to the debate over the use of the filibuster in the United States Senate, leading to the use of the nuclear option to bring it to the floor for a vote.

== Early life and education ==
Wilkins was born in 1963 in Muncie, Indiana, where he was raised by his single mother. He studied chemical engineering at Rose–Hulman Institute of Technology, graduating in 1986 with a Bachelor of Science, cum laude. Wilkins then attended Harvard Law School, where he was an executive editor of the Harvard Civil Rights–Civil Liberties Law Review. He graduated with a Juris Doctor in 1989.

== Professional career ==
After law school, Wilkins was a law clerk for Judge Earl Ben Gilliam of the U.S. District Court for the Southern District of California from 1989 to 1990. Wilkins worked at the Public Defender Service for the District of Columbia from 1990 to 2002, serving as chief of special litigation from 1996 to 2000. From 2002 to 2010, Wilkins was in private practice as a partner at the Washington, D.C. law firm Venable LLP, where he litigated patent disputes and other cases.

Wilkins was a member of the presidential commission that advised President George W. Bush on the establishment of the Smithsonian Institution's National Museum of African American History and Culture. He wrote about this experience, and the long history of the project, in Long Road to Hard Truth: The 100 Year Mission to Create the National Museum of African American History and Culture, published in 2016.

== Wilkins v. Maryland State Police ==
In May 1992, Wilkins was in a rented vehicle with three other family members when they were pulled over by Maryland State Police for violating the speed limit. At the time, the Maryland State Police Department instructed their officers to focus on black males in expensive vehicles when conducting traffic stops. Wilkins filed suit in the case of Wilkins v. Maryland State Police and eventually won a "landmark" settlement against the state of Maryland. As part of the case settlement, Maryland was required to maintain records of all traffic stops that resulted in vehicle search requests. The case helped bring national attention to the practice of racial profiling and helped popularize the term "driving while black".

== Federal judicial service ==
=== District court service ===
During the 111th Congress, Delegate Eleanor Holmes Norton recommended Wilkins for filling a vacancy on the United States District Court for the District of Columbia. On May 20, 2010, President Barack Obama nominated Wilkins to be a judge on the District Court for the District of Columbia, to a seat vacated by Judge James Robertson, who assumed senior status on December 31, 2008. He was confirmed by the United States Senate on December 22, 2010. Wilkins received his commission on December 27, 2010. His service as a district court judge was terminated on January 24, 2014, when he was elevated to the court of appeals.

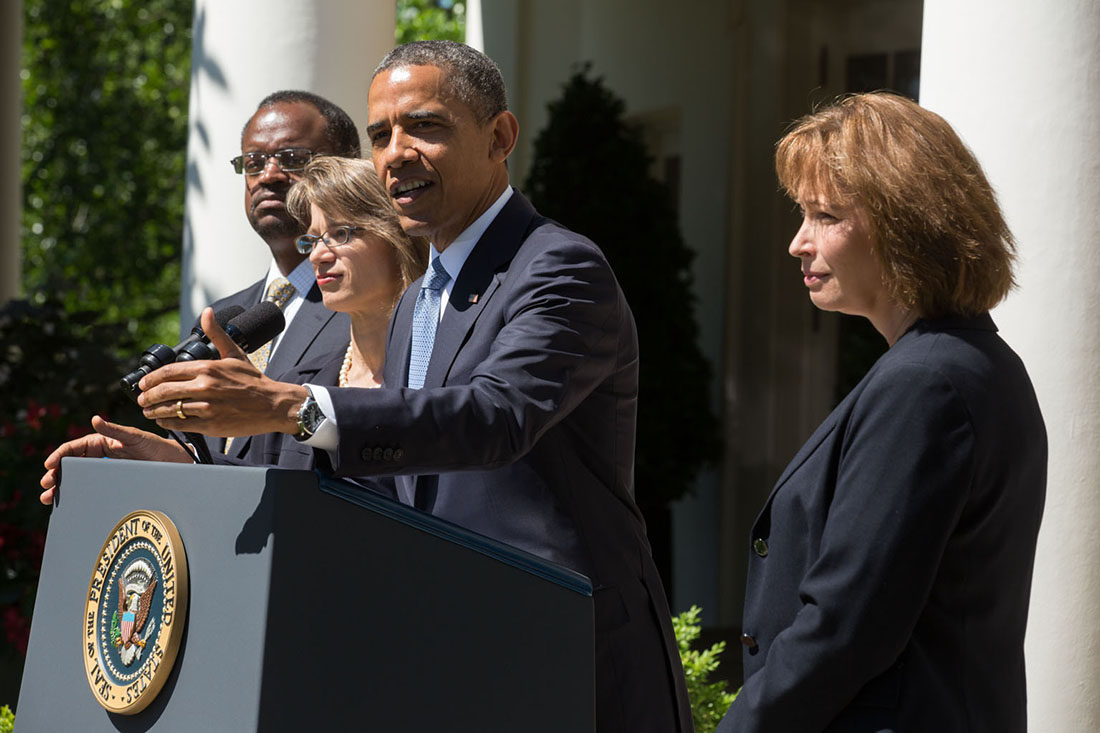
President Barack Obama delivers a statement announcing the nomination of Robert Leon Wilkins, Cornelia Pillard, and Patricia Millett

=== D.C. Circuit service ===
On June 4, 2013, President Obama nominated Wilkins to serve as a United States Circuit Judge on the United States Court of Appeals for the District of Columbia Circuit, to the seat vacated by Judge David B. Sentelle, who assumed senior status on February 12, 2013. On October 31, 2013, the United States Senate Committee on the Judiciary voted to report Wilkins' nomination to the floor of the United States Senate by a 10–8, party-line vote. On November 14, 2013, Senate Majority Leader Harry Reid moved to invoke cloture on Wilkins' nomination, seeking to end a filibuster of his nomination by Senate Republicans. The Senate failed to invoke cloture on November 18, 2013, by a 53–38 vote, with Orrin Hatch voting "present". Reid planned to hold a vote on Wilkins' nomination before the Senate adjourned for the year on December 20, but the vote did not take place. Cloture was subsequently invoked on January 9, 2014, by a 55–38 vote, with Orrin Hatch voting "present". He was confirmed by the United States Senate on January 13, 2014, by a 55–43 vote. His confirmation marked the first time the U.S. Court of Appeals for the D.C. Circuit had a full complement of judges in over 22 years since Clarence Thomas left the court on October 23, 1991, upon his joining the United States Supreme Court. He received his commission on January 15, 2014.

After the death of Justice Antonin Scalia on February 13, 2016, Wilkins' name was among those mentioned by court-watchers as a possible successor.

In April 2018, Wilkins wrote for the majority when it found that a Federal Trade Commission staff letter rejecting an earlier staff letter and concluding that use of soundboard technology violates the Telemarketing and Consumer Fraud and Abuse Prevention Act was not itself subject to judicial review under the Administrative Procedure Act, over the dissent of Judge Patricia Millett.

== See also ==
- Barack Obama judicial appointment controversies
- Barack Obama Supreme Court candidates
- List of African-American federal judges
- List of African-American jurists

Legal offices
Preceded by James Robertson	Judge of the United States District Court for the District of Columbia; 2010–2014	Succeeded by Randolph D. Moss
Preceded by David B. Sentelle	Judge of the United States Court of Appeals for the District of Columbia Circuit; 2014–present	Incumbent
