= 2005 United States Court of Appeals for the District of Columbia Circuit opinions of John Roberts =

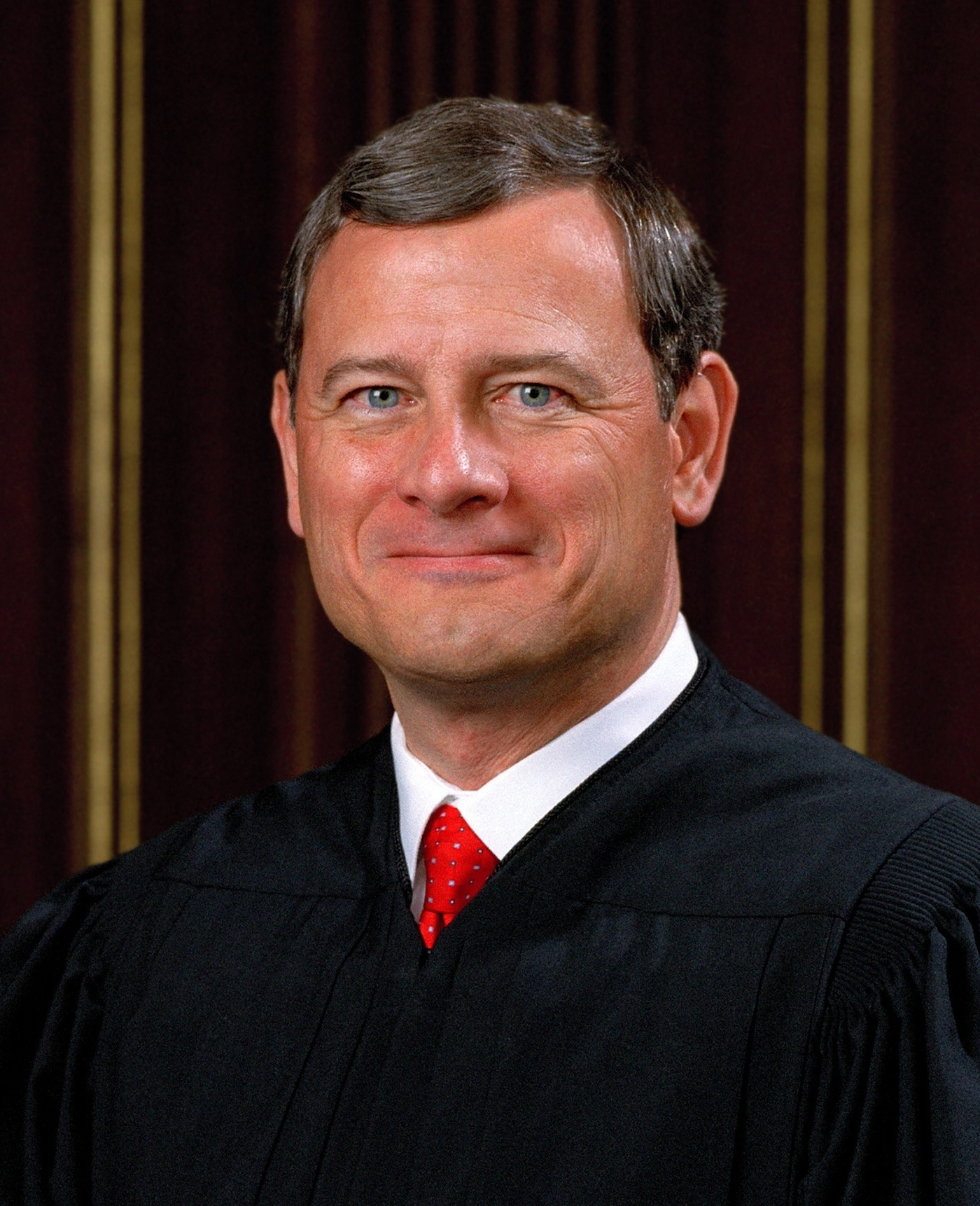
John G. Roberts, Jr.

John Roberts served his third and final year on the United States Court of Appeals for the District of Columbia Circuit in 2005. He was nominated to the Supreme Court of the United States by President George W. Bush originally on July 19 for the seat being vacated by Justice Sandra Day O'Connor's retirement and later nominated on September 5 to be Chief Justice of the United States after William Rehnquist's death two days prior. He was confirmed by the United States Senate on September 29 and left the circuit bench. He was succeeded on the D.C. Circuit by Patricia Millett. The following are opinions written by Judge Roberts in 2005.

January 2005
Michael J. Koszola v. Federal Deposit Insurance Corporation, 393 F.3d 1294 (D.C. Cir. January 7, 2005).
AT&T v. Federal Communications Commission, 394 F.3d 933 (D.C. Cir. January 14, 2005).
AFSCME CAC 26 v. Federal Labor Relations Authority, 395 F.3d 443 (D.C. Cir. January 14, 2005).
Taucher et al v. Commodity Futures Trading Commission, et al, 396 F.3d 1168 (D.C. Cir. January 28, 2005).

February 2005
United States v. Toms, 396 F.3d 427 (D.C. Cir. February 1, 2005).
Kentucky Public Service Commission v. Federal Energy Regulatory Commission, 397 F.3d 1004 (D.C. Cir. February 18, 2005).

April 2005
Universal City Studios v. Register of Copyrights, 402 F.3d 1238 (D.C. Cir. April 8, 2005).

June 2005
United States v. Lawson, 410 F.3d 735 (D.C. Cir. June 10, 2005).
Amoco Production Co. v. Watson, 410 F.3d 722 (D.C. Cir. June 10, 2005).
Outlaw v. Airtech, 412 F.3d 156 (D.C. Cir. June 24, 2005).

July 2005
Booker v. Robert Half International, 413 F.3d 77 (D.C. Cir. July 1, 2005).
Brady v. FERC, 416 F.3d 1 (D.C. Cir. July 8, 2005).
Fornaro v. James, 416 F.3d 63 (D.C. Cir. July 26, 2005).
