= Patricia Millett =

American judge (born 1963)

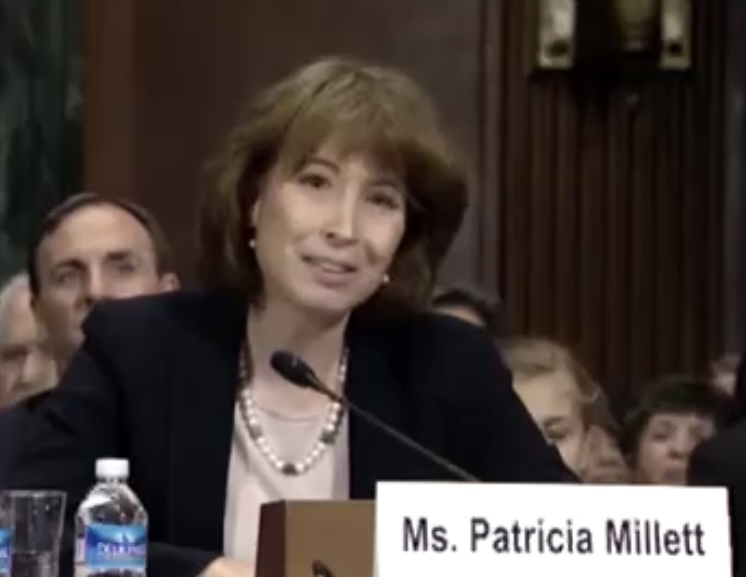

Judge of the United States Court of Appeals for the District of Columbia Circuit
- Incumbent
- Assumed office December 10, 2013
- Appointed by: Barack Obama
- Preceded by: John Roberts

Personal details
- Born: September 1963 (age 62) Dexter, Maine, U.S.
- Education: University of Illinois, Urbana-Champaign (BA); Harvard University (JD)

Patricia Ann Millett (/mɪˈlɛt/; born September 1963) is an American lawyer and jurist serving as a United States circuit judge of the United States Court of Appeals for the District of Columbia Circuit. She formerly headed the Supreme Court practice at the law firm Akin Gump Strauss Hauer & Feld. Millett also was a longtime former assistant to the United States Solicitor General and occasional writer for SCOTUSblog. At the time of her confirmation to the D.C. Circuit, she had argued 32 cases before the United States Supreme Court—once the record for a female lawyer. In February 2016, The New York Times identified her as a potential nominee to replace Justice Antonin Scalia.

Millett's 2013 nomination to the D.C. Circuit, along with the nominations of Robert L. Wilkins and Nina Pillard, ultimately became central to the debate over the use of the filibuster in the United States Senate, leading to the use of the so-called "nuclear option" to bring it to the Senate floor for a vote.

== Early life and education ==
Millett was born in 1963 in Dexter, Maine, and grew up in Marine, Illinois. Her father was historian and author Richard L. Millett. She graduated from the University of Illinois Urbana-Champaign in 1985 with a Bachelor of Arts, summa cum laude, in political science, and then from Harvard Law School in 1988 with a Juris Doctor, magna cum laude.

== Career ==
From 1988 to 1990, Millett was in private practice in the litigation department of the Washington, D.C. law firm Miller & Chevalier. She then was a law clerk for Judge Thomas Tang of the U.S. Court of Appeals for the Ninth Circuit from 1990 to 1992. From 1992 to 1996, Millett worked for the United States Department of Justice Civil Division's appellate staff, briefing and arguing more than 20 cases before federal appeals courts and occasionally state appeals courts.

In August 1996, Millett became an assistant to the United States Solicitor General, a position she held until September 2007. During that time, Millett argued 25 cases before the United States Supreme Court and briefed more than 50 others. She authored the Solicitor General's brief in pathbreaking cases including Tennessee v. Lane (successfully defending the constitutionality of Title II of the Americans with Disabilities Act) and Nevada Department of Human Resources v. Hibbs (successfully defending the constitutionality of the Family and Medical Leave Act).

In 2007, Millett joined the Washington, D.C. law firm of Akin Gump Strauss Hauer & Feld, co-chairing the firm's Supreme Court practice along with Tom Goldstein. At Akin Gump, her victories included Samantar v. Yousuf, in which she represented victims of torture who argued that the Foreign Sovereign Immunities Act did not grant immunity to former foreign government officials.

In October 2007, Millett began blogging at SCOTUSblog.

=== Federal judicial service ===
==== Consideration for Fourth Circuit ====
In February 2009, Legal Times reported that Millett was one of five Virginia residents recommended by the voluntary Virginia Bar Association lawyer organization to serve as a judge on the United States Court of Appeals for the Fourth Circuit, along with Virginia state senator John S. Edwards, Virginia Supreme Court Justice Barbara Milano Keenan, then University of Virginia School of Law professor James Ryan and former Virginia Supreme Court Justice John Thomas. At that time, the Fourth Circuit had four judicial vacancies, one of which was a seat generally thought to belong to Virginia, and all five candidates were among a larger group of individuals who had proactively submitted their information to the VBA and ostensibly hoped to be considered for a nomination to the Fourth Circuit by President Barack Obama.

On February 26, 2009, the Virginia State Bar separately deemed Millett to be "highly qualified" for the vacancy, along with Edwards, Keenan, and attorney Richard A. Simpson. Keenan was nominated by President Obama to fill the vacancy on September 14, 2009, confirmed by the Senate on February 26, 2010, and sworn in on March 9, 2010.

==== D.C. Circuit service ====
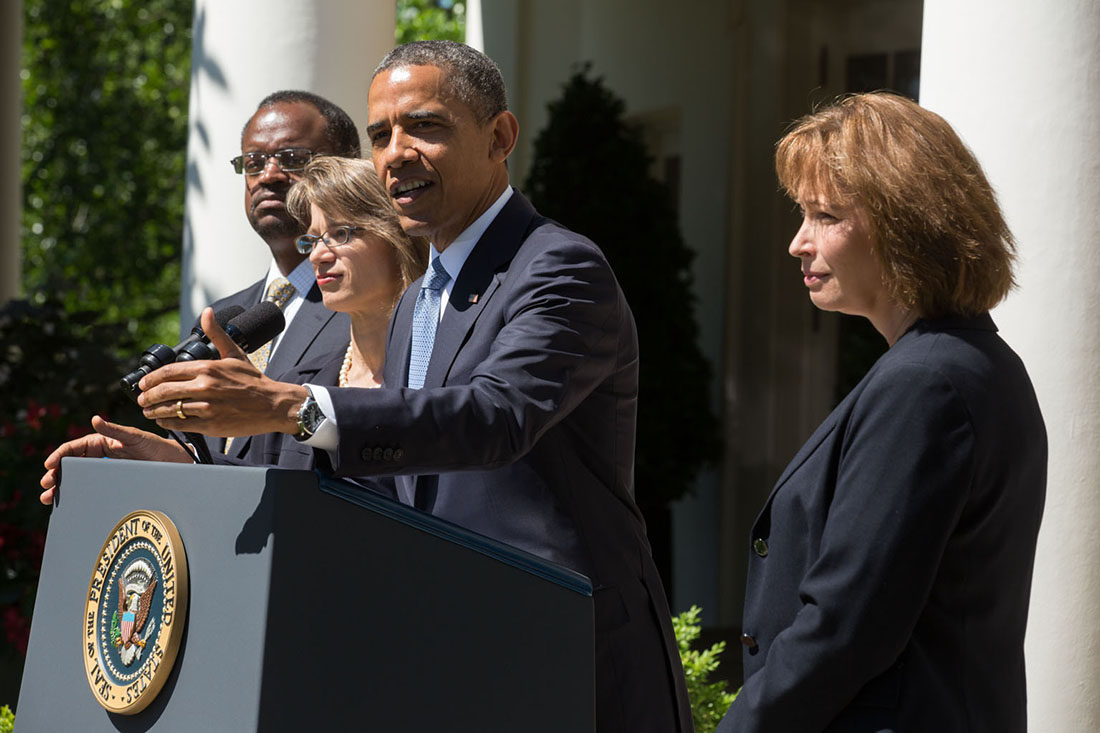
President Barack Obama delivers a statement announcing the nomination of Robert L. Wilkins, Nina Pillard, and Patricia Millett

On May 27, 2013, the New York Times reported that President Obama was considering nominating Millett to one of three vacancies on the United States Court of Appeals for the District of Columbia Circuit.

On June 4, 2013, Obama nominated Millett to serve as a United States circuit judge of the United States Court of Appeals for the District of Columbia Circuit, to the seat vacated by Judge John Roberts, who was elevated to the United States Supreme Court on September 25, 2005. The United States Senate Committee on the Judiciary held hearing on her nomination on July 10, 2013, and reported her nomination to the floor on August 1, 2013, by a 10–8 vote, entirely along party lines.

On October 28, 2013, Senate Majority Leader Harry Reid motioned to invoke cloture on Millett's nomination. On October 31, 2013, the motion to invoke cloture was rejected by a 55–38 vote, with 3 senators voting "present."

On November 21, 2013, the motion to invoke cloture was rejected again, by a 57–40 vote with 3 senators voting "present". A motion to reconsider the motion to invoke cloture was held shortly thereafter and was agreed to by a 57–43 vote. Senator Reid then requested a ruling from the presiding officer regarding the filibuster of judicial nominees. The President pro tempore ruled that the Senate required 60 votes to cut off a filibuster and move to a final vote. Senator Reid appealed that ruling and the Senate began voting on whether the President pro tempore's ruling should stand, setting up a vote on what is colloquially known as the "nuclear option." The ruling was not sustained by a 48–52 vote. As a result of that vote, the President pro tempore ruled that as of November 21, 2013, the threshold for invoking cloture on all executive branch nominees, and all district and circuit court nominees would be a simple majority of senators present and voting. Senator Mitch McConnell, the Senate Minority Leader, immediately requested an appeal of that ruling; that appeal failed by a 52–48 vote. The Senate then began voting on the motion to invoke cloture under the new majority-vote threshold. Cloture was subsequently invoked on her nomination by a 55–43 vote with 2 senators voting "present". On December 10, 2013, the Senate confirmed Millett by a 56–38 vote. She received her commission the same day.

After the death of Supreme Court justice Antonin Scalia on February 13, 2016, Millett's name was among those mentioned by court-watchers as a possible successor. President Obama ultimately nominated her D.C. Circuit colleague, Judge Merrick Garland.

=== Notable decisions ===
In April 2018, Millett dissented when Judge Robert L. Wilkins’s majority opinion found that a Federal Trade Commission staff letter rejecting an earlier staff letter and concluding that use of soundboard technology violates the Telemarketing and Consumer Fraud and Abuse Prevention Act was not itself subject to judicial review under the Administrative Procedure Act.

In November 2021, Millett dissented in a case that struck down the EPA's fuel efficiency standards for trailers on trucks.

In December 2021, Millett wrote the majority opinion in a case brought by former president Donald Trump to block the release of presidential records that the congressional committee investigating the January 6, 2021, attack on the U.S. Capitol.

== Personal life ==
Millett and her husband, Robert King, reside in Alexandria, Virginia. She is active in Aldersgate United Methodist Church and has a second degree black belt in Tae Kwon Do, according to her answers to a questionnaire for the U.S. Senate Judiciary Committee. Her husband, King, is a Navy veteran who deployed for Operation Iraqi Freedom and the war in Afghanistan.

== See also ==
- Barack Obama Supreme Court candidates
- Barack Obama judicial appointment controversies

Legal offices
| Preceded by John Roberts | Judge of the United States Court of Appeals for the District of Columbia Circuit; 2013–present | Incumbent |
