= Abdiwali Nur =

American man who joined the Islamic State

Abdi Nur
- Born: April 1, 1994 (age 32)
- Occupation: student
- Known for: American man who joined the Islamic State and recruited many others
- Status: at large, presumed deceased
- Criminal charges: conspiracy to provide material support to a designated foreign terrorist organization

Abdiwali Nur, often called Abdi Nur (born April 1, 1994), is a Somali-American former resident of Minnesota who joined the Islamic of State of Iraq and the Levant in May 2014 and was later charged in absentia with conspiring to aid ISIL. After arriving in ISIL territory he kept in touch with his friends back in Minnesota and inspired them to try to travel to Syria also, although only two actually made it there. Nur is believed to have died fighting for ISIL, but this has not been confirmed.

== Background and joining ISIL ==
Nur was a resident of Minnesota, born of Somali immigrant parents. He attended a community college outside Minneapolis and spoke of becoming a lawyer someday. In the months before his disappearance, he had become much more religious and told his family they should pray more and dress in Islamic clothing, and he also began talking about jihad. These changes coincided with the start of his attendance at a different mosque, the Al Farooq Youth and Family Center in Bloomington, Minnesota. Nur had a Twitter account and began posting more religious content around that time. In late March 2014 he posted a quote from jihadist cleric Anwar al-Awlaki. On April 2, the day after his twentieth birthday, he wrote on Twitter, "If the sky would be proud of the existence of the stars, the land should be proud of the existence of the Mujahideen."

He was 20 years old when he flew from Minneapolis to Istanbul in Turkey on May 29, 2014, then crossed the border into Syria. After his arrival, he contacted home over Kik to say he had gone "to the brothers" and would not be coming back. His older sister told him "going to kill poor people is not the answer" and pleaded with him to change his mind, but Nur replied, "And everyone dies but I want the best death." Nur told his family where he could find his Volkswagen Jetta, which he had left at a light rail station. He said he believed that if he died in Syria, he would be able to take his family members with him to jannah.

His sister reported him missing to the Minneapolis police on May 30. She also went to confront Nur's associates at the Bloomington mosque. Nur's family was reportedly "devasted" by his departure for Syria and "afraid" of attracting hostile attention in their Somali-American community. Leaders of the Al Farooq Youth and Family Center publicly accused a mosque volunteer, Amir Meshal, of encouraging jihadism among the teenage attendees, and in June they banned the man from the premises. He was also banned from a mosque in Minneapolis. Lawyer and terrorism expert Peter Erlinder described him as “like a pied piper.” Meshal is on the No Fly List but has never been charged with a crime. He has sued the U.S. government multiple times, claiming he is an innocent man wrongly targeted by federal authorities.

Yusra Ismail, a teenage girl who attended the same mosque as Nur and studied Arabic and the Quran there, also joined ISIL a few months after Nur did.

== ISIL and criminal charges ==
After arriving in Syria, Nur posted online frequently, saying he was teaching English and "hyped" about fighting with the "amazing brothers." He had a question and answer session on Ask.fm on August 7, 2014, and someone asked who had brainwashed him, and Nur replied, "The Words of Allah, The Quran, that’s what brain washed me." He kept in regular contact with his friends back home.

In November 2014, Nur and another Minnesota man he knew, 18-year-old Abdullahi Yusuf, were charged with conspiracy to provide material support to a designated foreign terrorist organization. Authorities realized Yusuf was going to join ISIL when they investigated his request for an expedited passport. Yusuf also tried to fly to Turkey to join ISIL on May 28, 2014, but was stopped at the airport. Authorities determined the car that dropped him off at the airport had been driven by Nur, and started looking for Nur on May 29, only to discover he had left the country that same day. The FBI investigated the possibility that an ISIL recruiter gave both Yusuf and Nur the money for their plane tickets, since neither man had a job or access to the necessary funds.

In February 2015, Hamza Naj Ahmed was charged with conspiring to provide material support to ISIL. In April, another six Minnesota men between 19 and 21 years old, all in Nur's friend group, were charged with trying to join ISIL: Zacharia Yusuf Abdurahman, Abdirahman Yasin Daud, Adnan Farah, Mohamed Abdihamid Farah, Hanad Mustafe Musse and Guled Ali Omar. In December, an eighth man was charged: Abdirizak Mohamed Warsame. Authorities stated all the men had been recruited online by Nur.

Omar had a brother who had joined the Somali terror group Al-Shabaab. Omar and two other people tried to join ISIL via Mexico in May 2014, but the plan went nowhere as Omar's family stopped him from traveling. Yusuf Jama, one of the people who tried to leave with him, was able to leave on June 9, 2014, and is believed to have been killed in December. Omar made a second attempt to join ISIL on his own in November 2014, but was stopped at the airport. Mohamed Farah also made multiple attempts to join ISIL. He and Ahmed tried to fly out together, but were prevented from boarding their flights. He and Daud were caught by law enforcement after they purchased fake passports to use for a second attempt to join.

In August 2016, a ninth man, Mohamed Amiin Ali Roble, was charged with joining ISIL in 2015, funding his trip with money he'd gotten from a legal settlement. Roble had flown to Istanbul and then traveled to Syria in December 2014. He was supposed to be back by June 2015, but he never returned. While in Turkey he withdrew $47,000 from his bank accounts and used the money to support ISIL. Roble is Nur's nephew.

Yusuf testified against the other men at their trials. He mentioned Meshal and said that up to 30 young men, including many of the defendants, would have meetings with him at mosques and at his home. He said Nur was closest to him, and that Meshal's religious beliefs were so radical that the men he was meeting with initially suspected he was working with law enforcement as an agent provocateur and trying to entrap them.

Yusuf could have faced a maximum term of 15 years in prison, but he was sentenced to time served plus 20 years of supervised release, including time in a federal halfway house. Abdurahman was sentenced to ten years in prison and apologized in court for his actions, saying he'd experienced discrimination in the US for being Muslim and that ISIL had been like a "hug" for his pain. Warsame, who had cooperated with the investigation and gone on the TV show 60 Minutes to denounce ISIL and warn others not to join, was sentenced to two and a half years in prison with credit for 11 months' time served. Ahmed was sentenced to 15 years in prison (later reduced to 10), Adnan Farah to 10 years in prison, Musse to 10 years in prison, Omar to 35 years in prison, and Mohamed Farah and Daud to 30 years in prison each.

In November 2017, Yusuf was released from the halfway house and moved back in with his parents. In 2018, Warsame was released from prison and sent to a re-entry center, and he was released to the custody of his family in the summer of 2019.

Nur is believed to have been killed in Syria, but details as to the circumstances of his death are unknown.

== See also ==
- Talha Asmal
- John Georgelas
- Ifthekar Jaman
