= TVPA =

TVPA may refer to:

- Torture Victim Protection Act of 1991, American legislation enacted 1992
- Victims of Trafficking and Violence Protection Act of 2000, American legislation enacted 2000
