= Randolph Moss =

American judge (born 1961)

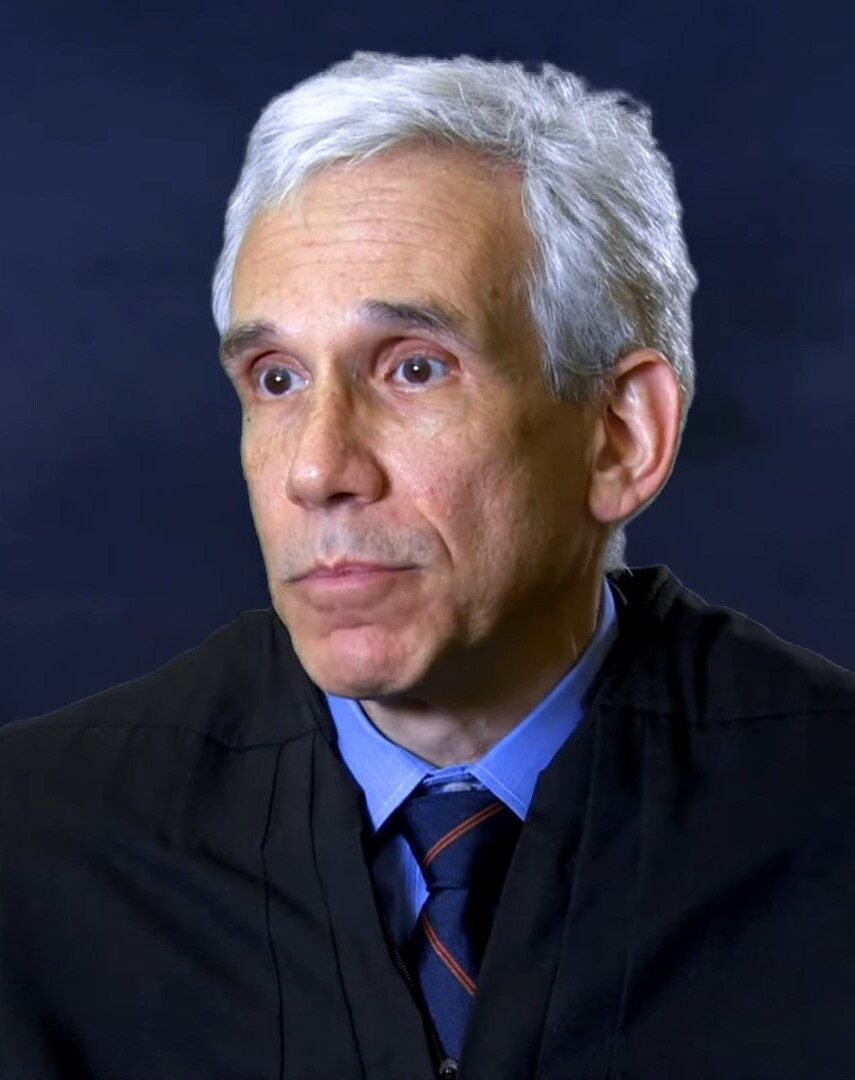
- Moss in 2021

Judge of the United States District Court for the District of Columbia
- Incumbent
- Assumed office November 14, 2014
- Appointed by: Barack Obama
- Preceded by: Robert L. Wilkins

United States Assistant Attorney General for the Office of Legal Counsel
- In office 1998 – 2001; Acting until 2000
- Appointed by: Bill Clinton
- Preceded by: Dawn Johnsen
- Succeeded by: Jay Bybee

Personal details
- Born: Randolph Daniel Moss; 1961 (age 64–65) Springfield, Ohio, U.S.
- Education: Hamilton College (BA); Yale University (JD)

Randolph Daniel Moss (born 1961) is a United States district judge of the United States District Court for the District of Columbia.

== Early life ==
Moss was born in Springfield, Ohio, into the family of Howard and Adrienne Moss, which also included his brother Eric Moss and his sister Cynthia F. Moss. He received a B.A., summa cum laude, in 1983 from Hamilton College. He received a Juris Doctor in 1986 from Yale Law School. He began his legal career as a law clerk to Judge Pierre N. Leval of the United States District Court for the Southern District of New York, from 1986 to 1987, and then served as a law clerk to Justice John Paul Stevens of the United States Supreme Court, from 1988 to 1989. He worked at the law firm of Wilmer, Cutler & Pickering from 1989 to 1996. From 1996 to 2001, he worked at the United States Department of Justice, Office of Legal Counsel, in a number of capacities. He served as Deputy Assistant Attorney General, from 1996 to 1998, Acting Assistant Attorney General, from 1998 to 2000, and as Assistant Attorney General, from 2000 to 2001. After his service in the Justice Department, he returned to his previous law firm, now known as Wilmer, Cutler, Pickering, Hale and Dorr LLP, where he chaired the firm's Regulatory and Government Affairs Department, leaving the firm upon his confirmation as a federal judge in November 2014.

=== Federal agency service ===
In 2000, when Moss was an assistant attorney general in the Office of Legal Counsel (OLC) of the United States Department of Justice, he wrote the memorandum opinion advising that the Department could not indict a sitting president. "The indictment or criminal prosecution of a sitting President would unconstitutionally undermine the capacity of the executive branch to perform its constitutionally assigned functions."

The Mueller Report (March 2019, Vol. II, p. 1) cited the Moss memorandum in partial justification of Special Counsel Robert Mueller's decision not to indict President Donald Trump. "Given the role of the Special Counsel as an attorney in the Department of Justice and the framework of the Special Counsel regulations, see 28 U.S.C. § 515; 28 C.F.R. § 600.7(a), this Office accepted OLC's legal conclusion for the purpose of exercising prosecutorial jurisdiction."

== Federal judicial service ==
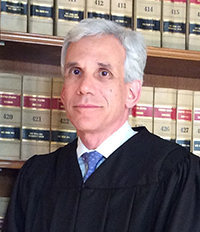
Judge Moss in 2015

On April 3, 2014, President Barack Obama nominated Moss to serve as a United States district judge of the United States District Court for the District of Columbia, to the seat vacated by Judge Robert L. Wilkins, who was elevated to the United States Court of Appeals for the District of Columbia Circuit. He received a hearing before the United States Senate Judiciary Committee on May 20, 2014. On June 19, 2014 his nomination was reported out of committee by a 11–7 vote. On September 18, 2014, Senate Majority Leader Harry Reid filed for cloture on his nomination. On November 12, 2014, the United States Senate invoked cloture on his nomination by a 53–45 vote. On November 13, 2014, his nomination was confirmed by a 54–45 vote. He received his judicial commission on November 14, 2014.

=== Notable rulings ===
In May 2016, Moss found that the Foreign Sovereign Immunities Act prevented an Ethiopian dissident living under asylum in the United States from suing the Ethiopian government for infecting his home computer with FinSpy spyware and then surveilling him in Maryland.

On October 16, 2018, Moss ruled against Education Secretary Betsy DeVos after she stopped an Obama-era rule from taking effect which protected students against fraud from for-profit colleges.

On March 1, 2020, Moss ruled that President Donald Trump unlawfully installed Ken Cuccinelli as acting Director of the United States Citizenship and Immigration Services (USCIS) and that therefore, certain directives related to removal of undocumented immigrants seeking asylum he implemented “must be set aside.”

On December 26, 2020, Moss ruled that the United States Justice Department unlawfully rescheduled the execution of Lisa Montgomery, the only woman on federal death row. On January 1, 2021, a three judge panel of the United States Court of Appeals for the District of Columbia Circuit vacated Moss's ruling.

On July 19, 2021, Moss sentenced Paul Hodgkins, a Florida man who participated in the 2021 United States Capitol attack to eight months in prison. Moss acknowledged that this man was part of a larger mob, but said that "Although you were only one member of a larger mob, you actively participated in a larger event that threatened the Capitol and democracy itself." At the time of his sentencing, Hodgkins was the third person to be sentenced for their participation in the January 6 riot, and his sentence is the longest thus far.

On March 31, 2026, Moss ruled that a Trump White House executive order to defund NPR and PBS violated the First Amendment and is therefore "unlawful and unenforceable."

== See also ==
- List of law clerks for the fourth seat of the Supreme Court of the United States

Legal offices
Preceded by Robert L. Wilkins	Judge of the United States District Court for the District of Columbia; 2014–present	Incumbent
