= Cynthia F. Moss =

American neuroscientist

Cynthia F. Moss Professor
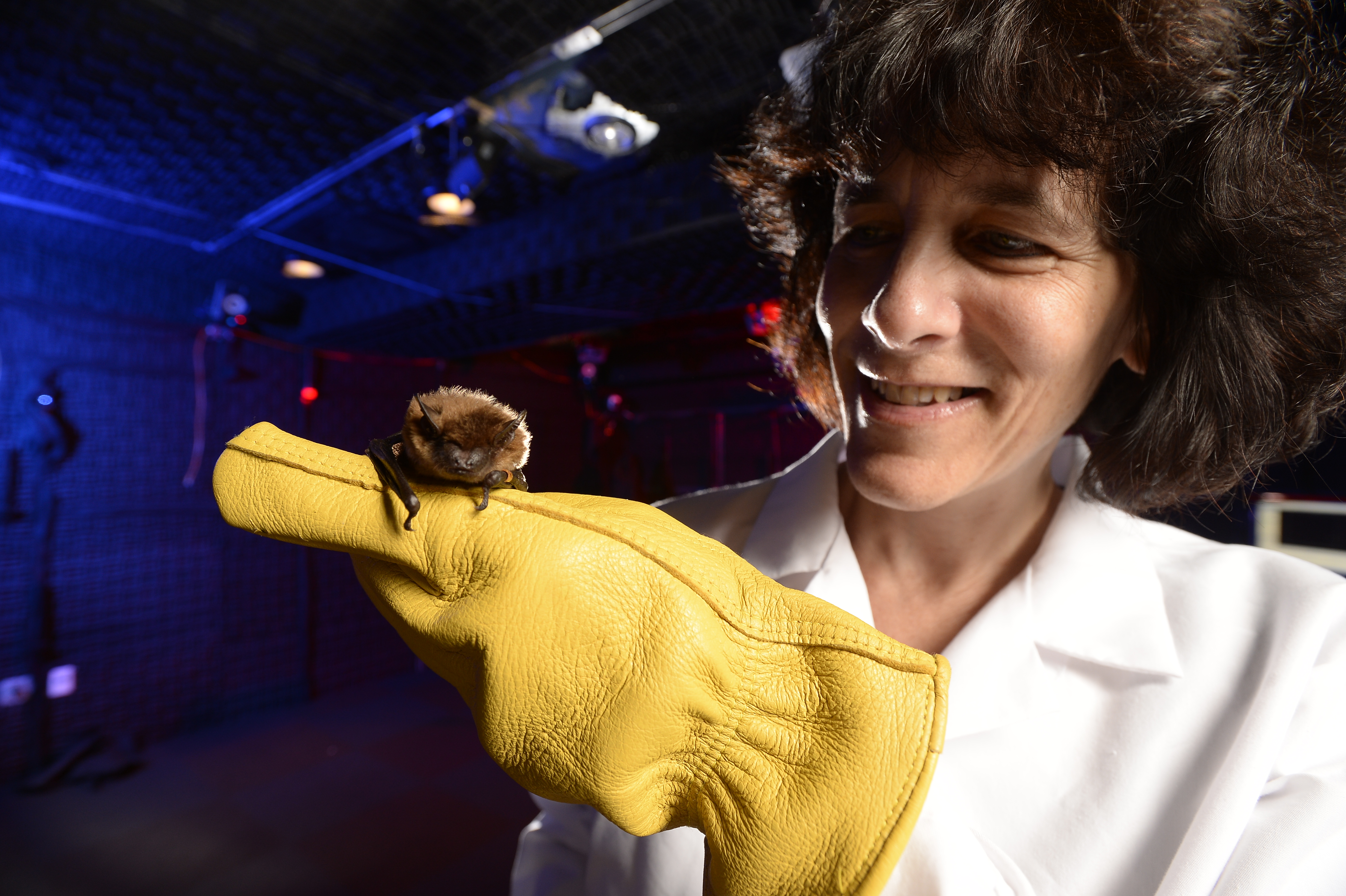
- Cynthia Moss with big brown bat
- Born: Columbus, Ohio
- Occupations: Professor in Psychological and Brain Sciences, Neuroscience, and Mechanical Engineering
- Spouse: Donald Berger
- Children: Natalie Louise, Jackson Raymond and Peter Ethan
- Parent(s): Howard A. and Adrienne H. Moss

Academic background
- Education: B.S., Summa cum laude University of Massachusetts Ph.D., Brown University
- Alma mater: Brown University
- Thesis: Hearing sensitivity and frequency selectivity in the green treefrog, Hyla cinerea (1986)
- Doctoral advisor: Andrea Megela Simmons

Academic work
- Discipline: Neuroscientist
- Sub-discipline: Sensory information processing and adaptive motor control
- Institutions: 1987-1988: Research Fellow, Brown University; 1989-1994: Assistant Professor, Harvard; 1994-1995: Morris Kahn Associate Professor of Psychology, Harvard; 1995-2014: Professor, University of Maryland; Since 2014: Professor of Psychology, Johns Hopkins University

Cynthia F. Moss is an American neuroscientist and Professor of Psychological and Brain Sciences at Johns Hopkins University, with joint appointments in the Departments of Neuroscience and Mechanical Engineering. Moss is a Fellow of the American Association for the Advancement of Science, the Acoustical Society of America, and the International Society for Neuroethology. Her research focuses on the mechanisms of sensory-motor integration, scene perception, spatial attention, and spatial memory.

== Early life and education ==
Born in Columbus, Ohio, Moss is the daughter of Howard A. Moss and Adrienne H. Moss. She grew up in Rockville, Maryland, and had the opportunity to live for one year in Florence, Italy and one year in Linköping, Sweden during her teenage years. Her brother Randolph Moss is a judge in the United States District Court for the District of Columbia. Her brother Eric Moss is Senior Vice President, Deputy General Counsel & Chief Compliance Officer of the Bank of Montreal.

Moss graduated with a B.S. (Summa cum laude) from the University of Massachusetts, Amherst, and earned a Ph.D. from Brown University. After earning her graduate degree, she was a Postdoctoral Fellow at the University of Tübingen, Germany, and later a Research Fellow at Brown University.

== Research and career ==
In 1989 Moss joined the faculty of Harvard University as an assistant professor. She became the Morris Kahn Associate Professor in 1994.

Moss accepted a professorship in 1995 at the University of Maryland, College Park (UMCP), in the Department of Psychology and the Institute for Systems Research. During her tenure at UMCP, she was Director of the interdepartmental graduate program in Neuroscience and Cognitive Science. She was named a professor emerita UMCP .

In 2014, Moss joined the faculty at Johns Hopkins University as Professor of Psychological and Brain Sciences. She holds appointments in the Krieger School of Arts and Sciences, Whiting School of Engineering, and the School of Medicine.

Moss's research seeks to understand the brain's representation of dynamic sensory information in the natural environment. Her research program uses the active sensing system of echolocating bats, gaining access to the sensory information these animals use to guide their behaviors.

Echolocating bats produce high frequency sounds and extract information carried by echo returns to guide natural behaviors. Moss's lab group pioneered the use of synchronized high-speed video and microphone array recordings to quantify the bat's coordinated echolocation and flight behavior during target tracking and discrimination, obstacle avoidance, social interactions, and navigation.

Moss's research uses modern neuroscience tools to discover mechanisms of auditory scene analysis, spatial memory and navigation, representing stimulus space and orienting behaviors, sensorimotor transformations, object distance perception and tactile sensing.

== Selected publications ==
=== Articles ===
- Schnitzler, Hans-Ulrich; Moss, Cynthia F.; Denzinger, Annette (August 2003). "From spatial orientation to food acquisition in echolocating bats". Trends in Ecology & Evolution. 18 (8): 386–394. doi:10.1016/S0169-5347(03)00185-X.
- Surlykke, Annemarie (1 November 2000). "Echolocation behavior of big brown bats, Eptesicus fuscus, in the field and the laboratory". The Journal of the Acoustical Society of America. 108 (5): 2419–2429. Bibcode:2000ASAJ..108.2419S. doi:10.1121/1.1315295. PMID 11108382.
- Ulanovsky, Nachum; Moss, Cynthia F. (7 January 2007). "Hippocampal cellular and network activity in freely moving echolocating bats". Nature Neuroscience. 10 (2): 224–233. doi:10.1038/nn1829. ISSN 1546-1726. PMID 17220886.
- Moss, Cynthia F.; Surlykke, Annemarie (1 October 2001). "Auditory scene analysis by echolocation in bats". The Journal of the Acoustical Society of America. 110 (4): 2207–2226. Bibcode:2001ASAJ..110.2207M. doi:10.1121/1.1398051. PMID 11681397.
- Ghose, Kaushik; Horiuchi, Timothy K.; Krishnaprasad, P. S.; Moss, Cynthia F. (2006-04-18). "Echolocating Bats Use a Nearly Time-Optimal Strategy to Intercept Prey". PLOS Biology. 4 (5): e108. doi:10.1371/journal.pbio.0040108. ISSN 1545-7885. PMC 1436025. PMID 16605303.
- Sterbing-D'Angelo, Susanne; Chadha, Mohit; Chiu, Chen; Falk, Ben; Xian, Wei; Barcelo, Janna; Zook, John M.; Moss, Cynthia F. (2011-07-05). "Bat wing sensors support flight control". Proceedings of the National Academy of Sciences. 108 (27): 11291–11296. Bibcode:2011PNAS..10811291S. doi:10.1073/pnas.1018740108. ISSN 0027-8424. PMC 3131348. PMID 21690408.
- Moss, Cynthia F.; Surlykke, Annemarie (2010-08-05). "Probing the Natural Scene by Echolocation in Bats". Frontiers in Behavioral Neuroscience. 4. doi:10.3389/fnbeh.2010.00033. ISSN 1662-5153. PMC 2927269. PMID 20740076.

=== Books ===
- Moss, C. F., & Shettleworth, S. J. (Eds.). (1996). Neuroethological studies of cognitive and perceptual processes. Westview Press. ISBN 978-0367317003
- Thomas, J. A., Moss, C. F., & Vater, M. (Eds.). (2002). Echolocation in Bats and Dolphins. University of Chicago Press. ISBN 978-0226795980

== Awards and honors ==
- 1992 – Phi Beta Kappa Teaching Award
- 1992 – National Science Foundation Young Investigator Award
- 2010 – University of Maryland Regents Faculty Award for Research and Creativity
- 2000 – Fellow of the Institute for Advanced Study in Berlin
- 2001 – Fellow of the Acoustical Society of America
- 2008 – Fellow of the Institute for Advanced Study in Berlin
- 2012 – Fellow of the American Association for the Advancement of Science
- 2017 – Hartman Award in Auditory Neuroscience
- 2018 – James McKeen Cattell Fellow Award
- 2018 – Fellow of the International Society for Neuroethology
- 2019 – Alexander von Humboldt Research Prize
- 2023 – Phi Beta Kappa visiting scholar
- 2024-2026 -- President, International Society for Neuroethology
