= Richard Leroy Millett =

American Historian and Author

- Born: September 25, 1938; Providence, Rhode Island
- Died: December 25, 2023 (aged 85); Maryville, Illinois
- Education: Harvard College (BA); University of New Mexico (MA, PhD)
- Occupations: professor, Historian, and Author
- Works: Latin American Democracy: Emerging Reality or Endangered Species? Searching for stability: The U.S. Development of Constabulary Forces in Latin America and the Philippines. Guardians of the Dynasty Colombia's Conflicts: The spillover effects of a wider war
- Spouse(s): Nina Frances Fish; Denice (Carr) Millett
- Children: Lawrence Dean Millett; Patricia Ann Millett; Joan Millett
- Relatives: Barbara Pendley (sister); Lewis Millett (distant cousin)
- Awards: William J Perry Award for Excellence in Security and Defense Education from the Center for Hemispheric Defense Studies (2014)

Richard Leroy Millett (September 25, 1938 – December 25, 2023) was an American historian, author, policy analyst, and professor best known for his expertise on Latin America—particularly civil–military relations and Central America. Among other teaching and research roles, Millett spent 33 years on the faculty of Southern Illinois University Edwardsville (SIUE), where he taught history and Latin American studies, retiring as a professor emeritus in 1999.

== Early life and education ==
Millett was born on September 25, 1938, in Providence, Rhode Island. His parents were Clara (Denham) Millett and Leroy Franklin Millett. He spent much of his childhood in Southern California.

=== Undergraduate Studies ===
Millett attended Harvard College, where he was a member of Kirkland House, and earned an A.B. with honors in history in 1960. His senior honors thesis on United States intervention in Nicaragua marked the start of a 65-year career in Latin American history and military studies.

Millett later said that this thesis topic was suggested to him completely "out of the blue" during his junior year, and that he "didn't even know there had been an intervention in Nicaragua" at the time. Millett's research included a stint at the National Archives, after which he resolved to gain a better understanding of Latin American history and learn to speak Spanish (a language he ultimately became fluent in).

=== Graduate Studies ===
Millett went on to earn his MA and PhD at the University of New Mexico in 1962 and 1966, respectively. His PhD dissertation, entitled The History of the Guardia Nacional de Nicaragua, 1925–1965, discussed the Nicaraguan National Guard's development under American sponsorship and impact on Nicaraguan political and social development, as well as the broader implications of this history for American foreign policy. Millett noted that the Nicaraguan National Guard had previously received "very limited attention" from scholars despite its great impact on Nicaraguan society.

Millett's dissertation eventually served as the foundation for his first book, Guardians of the Dynasty: A History of the U.S. Created Guardia Nacional de Nicaragua and the Somoza Family, published in 1977.

=== Other education ===
Millett was a graduate of the Air War College. He also did postdoctoral work at Ohio State University.

== Career ==
Millett had a distinguished academic career that extended to the public sphere.

=== Academic and Research career ===
After obtaining his PhD in 1966, and before his retirement in 1999, Millett taught history and Latin American studies at Southern University of Illinois Edwardsville. Former students and colleagues remember him as a generous mentor who served on "countless master’s theses and PhD dissertation committees" and helped young scholars build professional networks in the United States and across Latin America. During this time, Millett became a resident of Marine, Illinois.

Over the course of his life, Millett taught at multiple other institutions as well, including the Air War College, the Marine Corps University, the University of Miami, Saint Louis University, and Copenhagen Business School. He also received two Fulbright Fellowships: one in 1981 to teach at four universities in Colombia, and the other in 2007 to serve as the Distinguished Chair of American Studies at the Center for the Study of the Americas in Copenhagen, Denmark. Millett also worked as a research associate at the Center for International Studies, University of Missouri-St. Louis, and as an adjunct professor at the Defense Institute of Security Assistance Management (which later became the School of Security Cooperation Studies at the Defense Security Cooperation University).

Between 1985 and 1989, Millett collaborated with political scientists David Ronfeldt and Konrad Kellen on a RAND Corporation study examining perceptions of U.S. involvement in Central America by Hondurans.

Between 2000 and 2001, Millett served as the Brigadier General H.L. Oppenheimer Chair of Warfighting Strategy at the Marine Corps University.

In 2014, Millett received the William J Perry Award for Excellence in Security and Defense Education from the Center for Hemispheric Defense Studies. The award is given to those having made "significant contributions" in the fields of security and defense education. Other winners include former Mexican President Felipe Calderon, former Colombian President Alvaro Uribe, and retired U.S. General John Galvin.

In 2017, Millett was awarded a fellowship by the Carnegie Council for Ethics in International Affairs for its "The Living Legacy of the First World War" research project. His work focused on "the lasting impacts of World War I on the [United States'] relations with 20 different countries of Latin America" as well as "forgotten aspects of the Western Hemisphere and World War I." The latter included an examination of the United States' single regiment of Puerto Rican soldiers serving in World War I, which was "totally integrated" at a time that the "rest of the military was segregated," as well as of the "Hispanic experience" in World War I more broadly.

Additionally, Millett served as the vice president of the board of directors of the St. Louis Council on Foreign Relations and as a board member of the American Committees on Foreign Relations. He is also listed as a primary contributor for the Encyclopedia Britannica article on Panama.

=== Advice to Governments ===
Over the course of his career, Millett provided advice to the United States Military, State Department, and other governmental officials on Latin American affairs. He also testified before Congress on at least nineteen occasions and appeared on all major U.S. television networks, including PBS News Hour, Nightline, and Crossfire. He also helped supervise elections in four different countries.

== Views ==
Millett has been described as "a historian with a strong interest in policy in the sense that policy needs to be informed by history." He has also stated that his studies of history and the Spanish language arose out of a desire not "to be one of those who treated Latin America simply as a stage on which [the United States] danced."

Millett was frequently critical of U.S. Cold War policy in Latin America. For example, he described U.S. efforts to respond to Latin American revolutionary movements as resembling "a fire brigade during the London blitz," explaining: "American officials rush frantically from place to place, trying to contain the damage and save what they can of existing structures. But they seem unable to deal with the basic sources of their troubles."

A reviewer of Guardians of the Dynasty described Millett's work as reflecting a "Christian humanist outlook."

=== Cuba ===
In Beyond Praetorianism: The Latin American Military in Transition, Millett and fellow academic Michael Gold-Bliss argued that "Latin America's armed forces clearly are moving beyond praetorianism," referring to the tendency of militaries to intervene in domestic politics. Focusing on Cuba as an example, Millett opined that the Cuban military was unlikely to openly oppose Cuban leader Fidel Castro in light of the high level of control his regime had over the military, but was nonetheless "condemned to a prolonged struggle for institutional survival."

=== Nicaragua ===
Millett was highly critical of both the Somoza family, which ruled Nicaragua as dictators from 1936 to 1979, and the United States government's support of this dictatorship. His book, Guardians of the Dynasty, included an analysis of the United States' role in supporting the Nicaraguan National Guard, the National Guard's role in creating and maintaining the Somoza dictatorship, and other ways in which the United States and Nicaraguan elites enabled the Somoza dictatorship to survive for decades.

In March 1984, U.S. Senator Gary Hart gave an interview in which he claimed that Anastasio Somoza "kept cages with panthers inside" in the basement of his presidential palace, and that Somoza would feed his political opponents to the panthers for the entertainment of guests. Millett dismissed this claim as "quite apocryphal," explaining: "The Somozas were way too smooth for that, especially the old man. They were not brutal dictators until the last year. They were unbelievably corrupt. But corrupt and brutal are not the same things."

=== El Salvador ===
In 1983, during El Salvador's Civil War, Millett wrote an article in the New York Times discussing whether the United States could stop far-right El Salvadoran "death squads" responsible for a number of atrocities. While not a part of the official Salvadoran military forces, which received billions of dollars in military aid from the United States under both President Jimmy Carter and President Ronald Reagan, these death squads were generally understood to be aligned with the Salvadoran government's purpose of combating leftist rebels.

In his article, Millett argued that "death squads are more a symptom than a cause of El Salvador's problems," recounting the history of political violence in the region, the failure of official condemnations to curtail death squad activities, and widespread perception that anti-death squad rhetoric by U.S. officials was largely performative. Millett opined that the United States would have to take a firmer, sustained stance against death squads to dismantle them, offering "four basic conditions" required for a successful strategy and warning that "partial commitments are a recipe for ultimate disaster."

The Reagan administration continued to pour money into El Salvador in connection with its anti-communist Cold War agenda, without taking any of the strong or sustained measures recommended by Millett. As Millett predicted, death squads continued to engage in atrocities and faced little accountability.

== Personal life ==
Millett was married twice, first to Nina Frances Fish (née LaRoe) and then to Denice (Carr) Millett. He had three children: Lawrence Dean Millett (March 15, 1961 – July 23, 2003), Patricia Ann Millett, and Joan Millett. He passed away on December 25, 2023 (Christmas day).

Millett was a "man of deep Christian faith." During the COVID-19 pandemic, he started "a Sunday afternoon Zoom group" focused on the role of Christian faith in a "changing world." The group's participants came "from all over the globe."

Millett loved World Travel, traveling to nearly 100 countries over the course of his life. He was also a fan of the Chicago Cubs baseball team.

== Selected Works ==
Millett is said to have authored "over one hundred items, with articles appearing in Foreign Policy, The Washington Post, and The New Republic, among others." Illustrative books, articles, and other works include:

- 1966. The History of the Guardia Nacional de Nicaragua, 1925–1965 (PhD dissertation)
- 1977. Guardians of the Dynasty: A History of the U.S. Created Guardia Nacional de Nicaragua and the Somoza Family
- 1978. The Restless Caribbean: Changing Patterns of International Relations (Editors: Millett, Richard L.; Will, W. Marvin)
- 1996. Beyond Praetorianism: The Latin American Military in Transition (Editors: Millett, Richard L.; Gold-Bliss, Michael)
- 1997. The United States and Latin America's Armed Forces: A Troubled Relationship (Vol. 39 Journal of Interamerican Studies and World Affairs)
- 2002. Colombia's Conflicts: The spillover effects of a wider war
- 2010. Searching for stability: The U.S. Development of Constabulary Forces in Latin America and the Philippines
- 2015. Latin American Democracy: Emerging Reality or Endangered Species? (Editors: Millett, Richard L.; Holmes, Jennifer S.; Pérez, Orlando J.) ISBN 9780203884188.
