= Marine, Illinois =

- Village
- Location in Madison County, Illinois
- Coordinates: 38°47′12″N 89°46′43″W
- Country: United States
- State: Illinois
- County: Madison
- Township: Marine

Area
  - Total: 0.71 sq mi (1.83 km^{2})
  - Land: 0.71 sq mi (1.83 km^{2})
  - Water: 0 sq mi (0.00 km^{2})
- Elevation: 522 ft (159 m)

Population (2020)
  - Total: 912
  - Density: 1,294.2/sq mi (499.71/km^{2})
- Time zone: UTC-6 (CST)
  - Summer (DST): UTC-5 (CDT)
- ZIP code: 62061
- Area code: 618
- FIPS code: 17-46864
- GNIS feature ID: 2399256
- Website: villageofmarine.net

Marine is a village in Madison County, Illinois, United States. The population was 912 at the 2020 census.

== History ==
The village of Marine, originally referred to as Marinetown, was settled in 1834 by George W. Welsh, James Semple, Jordan W. Jeffress, and Abram "Abraham" Breath, who were sailors. The sound of the prairie grass blowing in the fields had reminded them of the sea, hence the name Marine. It was incorporated as a village in 1867 and reincorporated in 1888.

== Geography ==
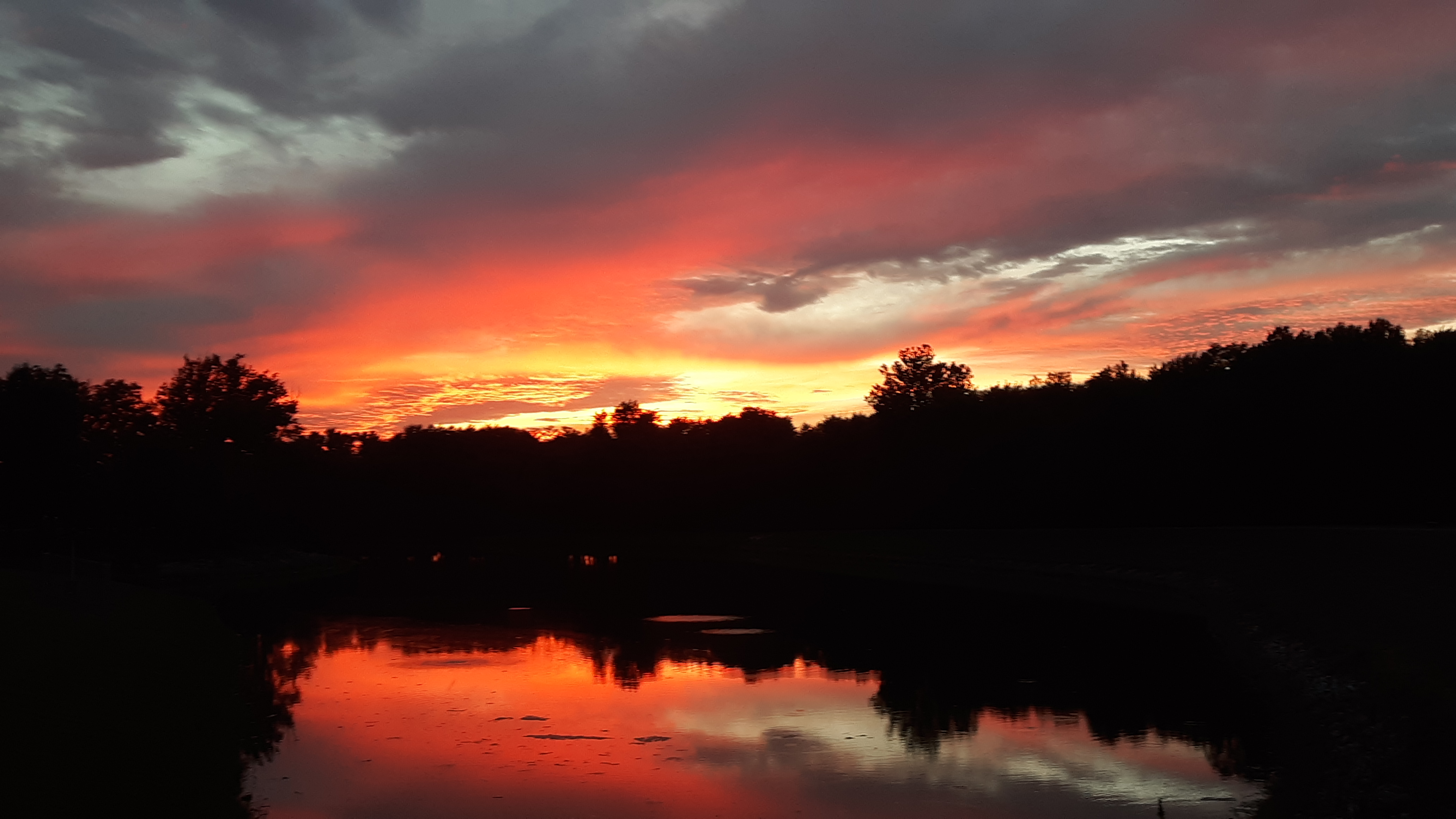
A sunset over the lake in Marine Heritage Park

Marine is located in eastern Madison County. Illinois Route 143 (Division Street) passes through the center of the village, leading southeast 6 miles (10 km) to Highland and west 10 miles (16 km) to Edwardsville, the county seat. Interstate 70 passes 2 miles (3 km) south and east of Marine, with access from IL 143 at Exit 24. I-70 leads northeast 21 miles (34 km) to Greenville and southwest 30 miles (48 km) to downtown St. Louis.

According to the U.S. Census Bureau, Marine has a total area of 0.71 square miles (1.84 km^{2}), all land. The village drains southwest to an unnamed tributary of Silver Creek, a south-flowing tributary of the Kaskaskia River.

== Demographics ==
Historical population
Census	Pop.	Note	%±
1850	126		—
1870	858		—
1880	774		−9.8%
1890	637		−17.7%
1900	666		4.6%
1910	685		2.9%
1920	676		−1.3%
1930	537		−20.6%
1940	557		3.7%
1950	657		18.0%
1960	813		23.7%
1970	882		8.5%
1980	957		8.5%
1990	972		1.6%
2000	910		−6.4%
2010	960		5.5%
2020	912		−5.0%
U.S. Decennial Census

As of the census of 2010, there were 960 people, 393 households, and 259 families residing in the village. The population density was 1,196.3 inhabitants per square mile (461.9/km^{2}). There were 380 housing units at an average density of 499.6 per square mile (192.9/km^{2}). The racial makeup of the village was 97.6% White, 0.6% African American, 0.4% Native American, 0.0% Asian, 0.7% from other races, and 0.6% from two or more races. Hispanic or Latino of any race were 1.3% of the population.

There were 393 households, out of which 26.7% had children under the age of 18 living with them, 53.2% were married couples living together, 7.1% had a female householder with no husband present, and 34.1% were non-families. 28.8% of all households were made up of individuals, and 23.2% had someone living alone who was 65 years of age or older. The average household size was 2.44 and the average family size was 3.03.

In the village, the population was spread out, with 20.2% under the age of 18, 8.3% from 20 to 24, 27.0% from 25 to 44, 29.6% from 45 to 64, and 12.7% who were 65 years of age or older. The median age was 38.3 years. For every 100 females, there were 97.9 males. For every 100 males age 18 and over, there were 99.5 females.

As of the 2000 census, the median income for a household in the village was $37,361, and the median income for a family was $44,500. Males had a median income of $38,654 versus $22,188 for females. The per capita income for the village was $18,133. About 4.5% of families and 6.2% of the population were below the poverty line, including 10.0% of those under age 18 and 2.8% of those age 65 or over.

== Education ==
Marine is part of the Triad Community Unit School District 2 which also includes the towns of Troy and St. Jacob. Marine has one elementary school which is located within the city limits. Students in grades K-5 attend this school. Then students will attend Triad Middle School followed by Triad High School along with students from Troy and St. Jacob.

== Notable people ==
- Patricia Millett, American federal judge
- Richard L. Millett, American academic
- Jerry Neudecker, umpire for Major League Baseball (1966–85); born in Marine
- Rusty Pence, pitcher for the Chicago White Sox; born in Marine
- Earl Emanuel Shepard, American Orthodontist
- Mark Voigt, racer with several NASCAR starts
