= Arar v. Ashcroft =

American legal case

- Court: United States Court of Appeals for the Second Circuit
- Full case name: Maher ARAR v. John ASHCROFT, formerly Attorney General of the United States; Larry D. Thompson, formerly Acting Deputy Attorney General; Tom Ridge, formerly Secretary for Homeland Security; James W. Ziglar, formerly Commissioner for Immigration and Naturalization Services; J. Scott Blackman, formerly Regional Director of the Eastern Regional Office of the Immigration and Naturalization Service; Paula Corrigan, Regional Director of Immigration and Customs Enforcement; Edward J. McElroy, formerly District Director of Immigration and Naturalization Services for New York District and now District Director of Immigration and Customs Enforcement; Robert Mueller, Director of the Federal Bureau of Investigation; and John Does 1-10, Federal Bureau of Investigation and/or Immigration and Naturalization Service Agents, Defendants.
- Argued: November 9, 2007
- Reargued: December 9, 2008
- Decided: November 2, 2009
- Citations: Panel: 532 F.3d 157; En banc: 585 F.3d 559

Case history
- Prior history: 414 F. Supp. 2d 250 (E.D.N.Y. 2006)

Court membership
- Judges sitting: En banc: Dennis Jacobs, Joseph M. McLaughlin, Guido Calabresi, José A. Cabranes, Rosemary S. Pooler, Robert D. Sack, Sonia Sotomayor, Barrington Daniels Parker Jr., Reena Raggi, Richard C. Wesley, Peter W. Hall, Debra Ann Livingston; Panel:

Case opinions
- Majority: Jacobs, joined by McLaughlin, Cabranes, Raggi, Wesley, Hall, Livingston
- Dissent: Sack, joined by Calabresi, Pooler, Parker
- Dissent: Parker, joined by Calabresi, Pooler, Sack
- Dissent: Pooler, joined by Calabresi, Sack, Parker
- Dissent: Calabresi, joined by Pooler, Sack, Parker

Arar v. Ashcroft, 585 F.3d 559 (2d Cir. 2009), was a lawsuit brought by Maher Arar against the United States and various U.S. officials pursuant to the Torture Victim Protection Act (TVPA), and the Fifth Amendment to the United States Constitution. The United States District Court for the Eastern District of New York dismissed Arar's complaint due to lack of personal jurisdiction and national security and foreign policy considerations. This ruling was ultimately upheld by a divided en banc panel of the United States Court of Appeals for the Second Circuit.

== Background ==
Maher Arar was a Canadian citizen who was deported to Syria by the U.S. government. In Syria, he was tortured, forced to falsely confess, and released after one year without being charged.

Arar sought a declaratory judgment that defendants' conduct violated his "constitutional, civil, and international human rights," as well as compensatory and punitive damages for the statutory and constitutional violations.

== Case ==
In January 2004, Arar announced that he would be suing then-American Attorney-General John Ashcroft over his treatment.

The Center for Constitutional Rights brought the suit Arar v. Ashcroft against former Attorney General John Ashcroft, then-FBI Director Robert Mueller, and then-Secretary of Homeland Security Tom Ridge, as well as numerous U.S. immigration officials including Immigration and Naturalization Service Commissioner James W. Ziglar. It charged the defendants violated Arar's constitutional right to due process; his right to choose a country of removal other than one in which he would be tortured, as guaranteed under the Torture Victims Protection Act; and his rights under international law.

The suit charged that Arar's Fifth Amendment due process rights were violated when he was confined without access to an attorney or the court system, both domestically before being rendered, and while detained by the Syrian government, whose actions were complicit with the U.S. Additionally, the Attorney General and INS officials who carried out his deportation also likely violated his right to due process by recklessly subjecting him to torture at the hands of a foreign government that they had every reason to believe would carry out abusive interrogation.

Further, Arar filed a claim under the Torture Victims Protection Act, adopted by the U.S. Congress in 1992, which allows a victim of torture by an individual of a foreign government to bring suit against that actor in U.S. Court. Arar's claim under the Act against Ashcroft and the INS directors was based upon their complicity in bringing about the torture he suffered. The case was filed in the United States District Court for the Eastern District of New York.

In its denial of Arar's petition for certiorari, the Supreme Court upheld the 2nd Circuit's en banc dismissal the case against the named defendants.

== Timeline ==
January 22, 2004 – The case was filed by the Center for Constitutional Rights in the U.S. District Court for the Eastern District of New York.

January 18, 2005 – The U.S. government moved to dismiss the case by asserting the "state secrets" privilege. The government claimed that the reason Arar was deemed a member of Al Qaeda and sent to Syria, instead of Canada, are "state secrets."

February 16, 2006 – Judge David G. Trager issued a memorandum and order dismissing the TVPA, torture, and detention claims pursuant to Rule 12(b)(6) of the Federal Rules of Civil Procedure, and the Fifth Amendment claim for lack of personal jurisdiction over the defendants. Judge Trager found that national security and foreign policy considerations prevented him from holding the officials liable for carrying out an extraordinary rendition even if such conduct violates our treaty obligations or customary international law.

September 12, 2006 – Arar filed a Notice of Appeal in the Second Circuit.

December 12, 2006 – Attorneys at the Center for Constitutional Rights filed an appeal in the Second Circuit on behalf of Arar.

November 9, 2007 – The appeal was argued before the Court of Appeals for the Second Circuit.

June 30, 2008 – The majority opinion found that adjudicating Arar's claims would interfere with national security and foreign policy and that as a foreigner who had not been formally admitted to the U.S., Arar had no constitutional due process rights with respect to the government's interference with his access to a lawyer. This was decided by a three judge panel by a 2–1 vote. The court reversed the district court and ruled Arar had shown a prima facie showing sufficient to establish personal jurisdiction over Thompson, Ashcroft, and Mueller, but upheld the dismissal on its merits.

August 12, 2008 – The Court of Appeals for the Second Circuit sua sponte issued an order that the case would be reheard en banc.

December 9, 2008 – En banc hearing was held.

November 2, 2009 - The 2nd Circuit United States Court of Appeals, in a 7-4 decision, upheld the ruling by the district court.

June 14, 2010 - The Supreme Court of the United States denied Arar's petition for certiorari.
