= Naomi Mezey =

American legal academic

Academic background
- Education: Wesleyan University; University of Minnesota; Stanford University

Academic work
- Discipline: Law, culture theory
- Institutions: Georgetown University Law Center

Naomi Jewel Mezey is an American legal scholar and is a professor of law at Georgetown University. Mezey contributes significantly to the field of law and culture, with additional scholarly interests in legal theory (jurisprudence) and translation and statutory interpretation.

Mezey in 1987 earned a B.A. (with high honors) from Wesleyan University, in 1992 a M.A. (American Studies, with distinction) from the University of Minnesota, and in 1995 a J.D. (with distinction) from Stanford Law School, where she served as an articles editor for the Stanford Law Review. She served as a law clerk for Judge Marilyn Hall Patel of the United States District Court for the Northern District of California and as a legislative aide to Senator Alan Cranston. Mezey has served on the faculty at Georgetown Law since 1996. In 2013, she was named Professor of the Year for GULC. Mezey is admitted to practice in California and the District of Columbia.
