= Barack Obama Supreme Court candidates =

US Supreme Court nominations

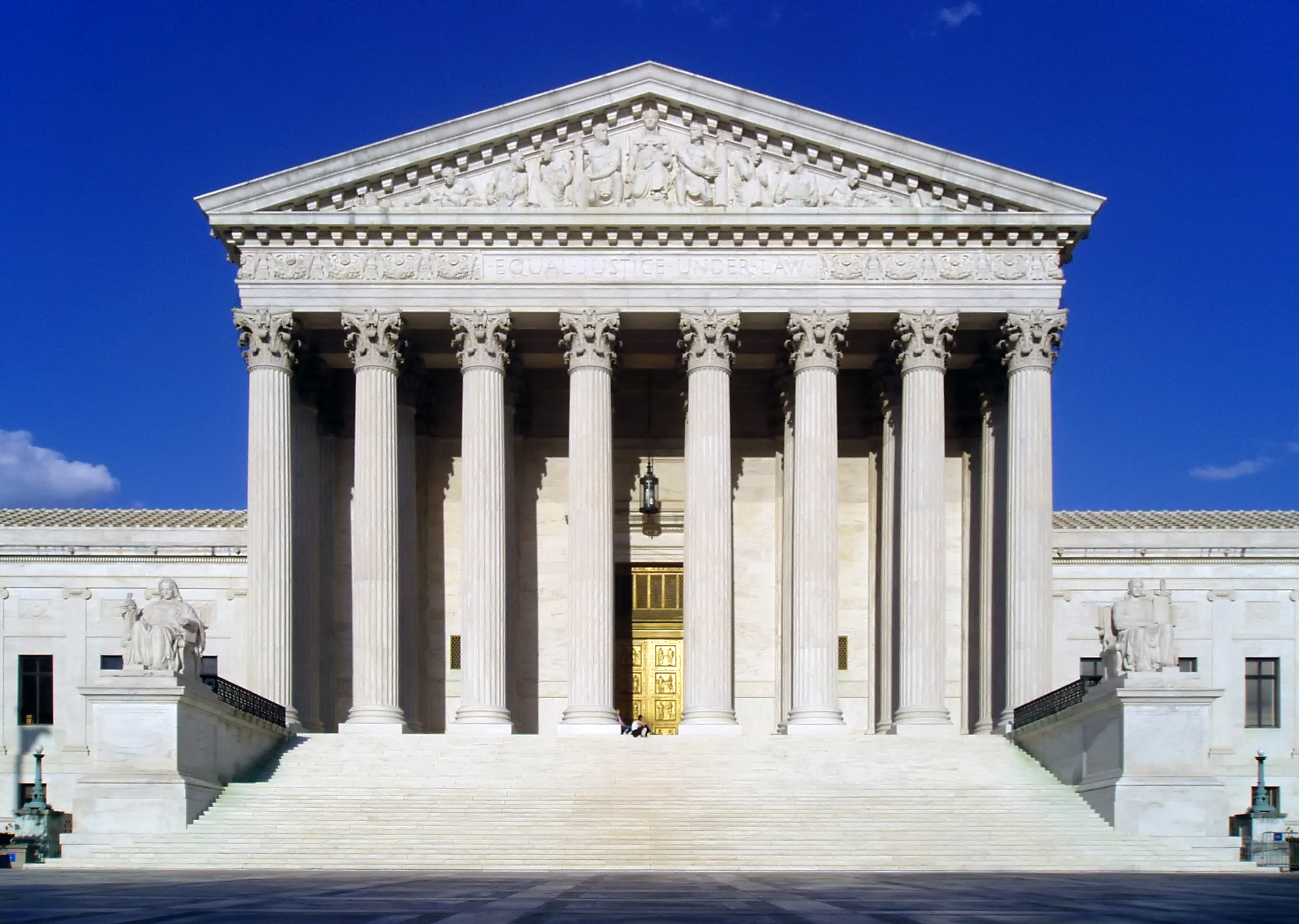
U.S. Supreme Court building

President Barack Obama made two successful appointments to the Supreme Court of the United States. The first was Judge Sonia Sotomayor to fill the vacancy created by the retirement of Justice David H. Souter. Sotomayor was confirmed by the United States Senate on August 6, 2009, by a vote of 68–31. The second appointment was that of Solicitor General Elena Kagan to replace the retired John Paul Stevens. Kagan was confirmed by the Senate on August 5, 2010, by a vote of 63–37.

During his final year in office, Obama had an opportunity to fill a third Supreme Court vacancy, following the February 13, 2016, death of Associate Justice Antonin Scalia. On March 16, 2016, he nominated Merrick Garland, the chief judge of the United States Court of Appeals for the District of Columbia Circuit to the Court. However, Republican leaders in the Senate announced that they planned to withhold voting on any potential nominee until a new president was elected. Senate Democrats responded that there was sufficient time to vote on a nominee before the election. Consequently, no action was taken on the nomination, which expired in January 2017.

During most of Obama's presidency, there had been speculation about the potential retirement of Justice Ruth Bader Ginsburg, who turned 80 in 2013 and was previously diagnosed with colon cancer and pancreatic cancer. Justice Ginsburg died on September 18, 2020, during Donald Trump's first presidency, and was replaced by Amy Coney Barrett on October 27, 2020.

== Court composition under Obama ==
Name	Appointed	Appointed by	Law school (JD or LLB)
John Roberts (Chief Justice)	2005	George W. Bush	Harvard University
Antonin Scalia (Note: Seat left vacant for the last year of the Obama presidency. See Merrick Garland Supreme Court nomination for details.)	1986	Ronald Reagan	Harvard University
Anthony Kennedy	1988	Ronald Reagan	Harvard University
Clarence Thomas	1991	George H. W. Bush	Yale University
Ruth Bader Ginsburg	1993	Bill Clinton	Columbia University
Stephen Breyer	1994	Bill Clinton	Harvard University
Samuel Alito	2006	George W. Bush	Yale University
Sonia Sotomayor	2009	Barack Obama	Yale University
Elena Kagan	2010	Barack Obama	Harvard University

== Politics ==
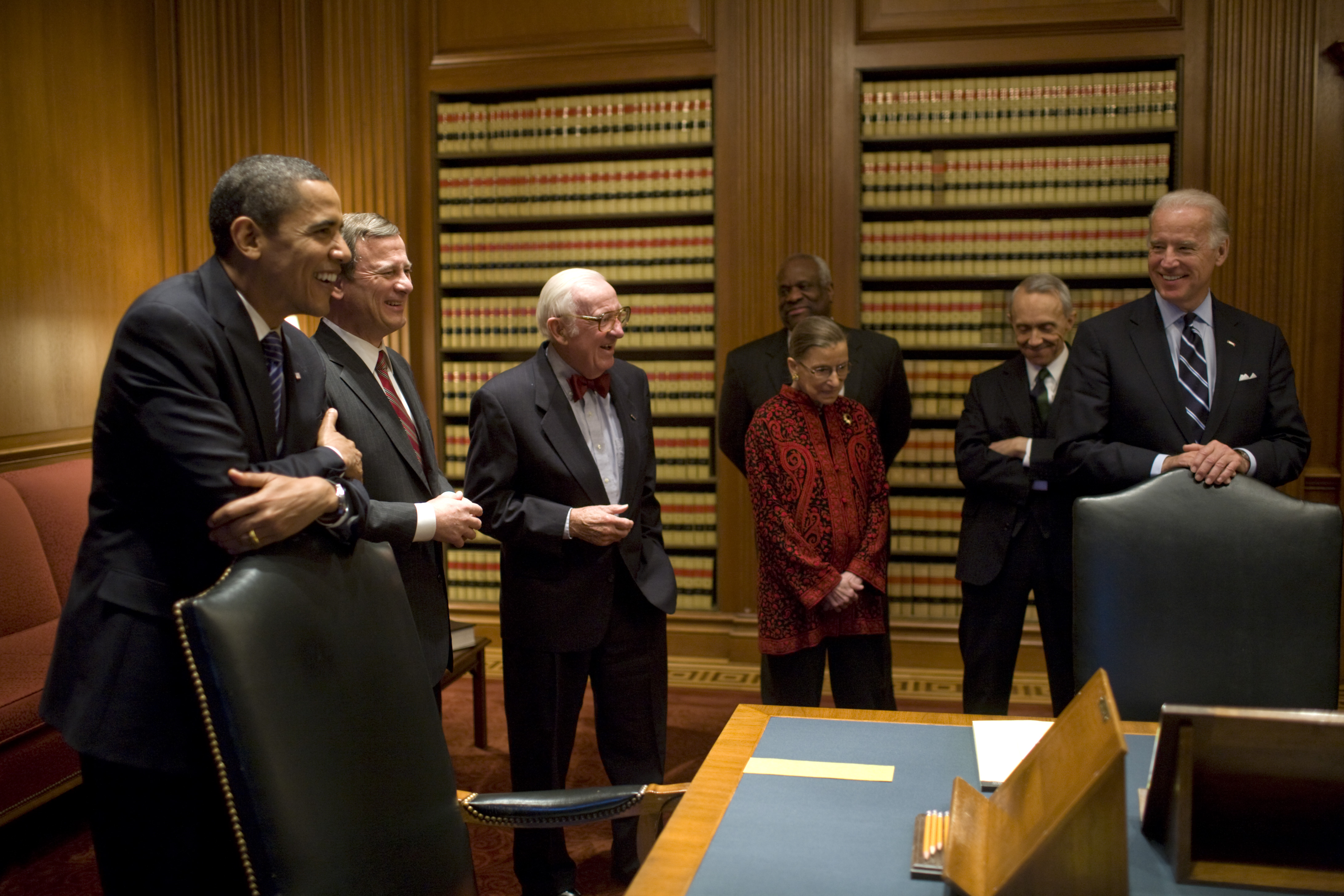
Barack Obama and Joe Biden with Supreme Court justices in the court's conference room, on January 14, 2009, the week before the inauguration. Shown are Chief Justice Roberts and Justices Stevens, Thomas, Ginsburg, and Souter.

=== Obama opposition to Bush nominees ===
During the 109th Congress, then-Senator Obama voted against both of President George W. Bush's nominees to the Supreme Court. In a speech announcing his opposition to John Roberts, Obama stated:

The problem I face ... is that while adherence to legal precedent and rules of statutory or constitutional construction will dispose of 95 percent of the cases that come before a court so that both a Scalia and a Ginsburg will arrive at the same place most of the time on those 95 percent of the cases – what matters on the Supreme Court is those 5 percent of cases that are truly difficult. In those 5 percent of hard cases, the constitutional text will not be directly on point.... In those circumstances, your decisions about whether affirmative action is an appropriate response to the history of discrimination in this country or whether a general right of privacy encompasses a more specific right of women to control their reproductive decisions, ... in those difficult cases, the critical ingredient is supplied by what is in the judge's heart.... The problem I had is that when I examined Judge Roberts' record and history of public service, it is my personal estimation that he has far more often used his formidable skills on behalf of the strong in opposition to the weak.

— Barack Obama

In explaining his opposition to Samuel Alito, Obama further evaluated the qualities he found important in a Supreme Court justice:

I have no doubt that Judge Alito has the training and qualifications necessary to serve. He's an intelligent man and an accomplished jurist. And there's no indication he's not a man of great character. But when you look at his record – when it comes to his understanding of the Constitution, I have found that in almost every case, he consistently sides on behalf of the powerful against the powerless; on behalf of a strong government or corporation against upholding Americans' individual rights.

=== Obama comments during 2008 presidential campaign ===
In a speech on July 17, 2007, before the Planned Parenthood Action Fund, he elaborated even more:

I think the Constitution can be interpreted in so many ways. And one way is a cramped and narrow way in which the Constitution and the courts essentially become the rubber stamps of the powerful in society. And then there's another vision of the court that says that the courts are the refuge of the powerless. Because oftentimes they can lose in the democratic back and forth. They may be locked out and prevented from fully participating in the democratic process. ... And we need somebody who's got the heart – the empathy – to recognize what it's like to be a young teenage mom. The empathy to understand what it's like to be poor or African-American or gay or disabled or old – and that's the criteria by which I'll be selecting my judges.

In November 2007, Obama was asked about the kind of justices he would appoint to the Supreme Court. He responded:

I taught constitutional law for 10 years, and . . . when you look at what makes a great Supreme Court justice, it's not just the particular issue and how they rule, but it's their conception of the Court. And part of the role of the Court is that it is going to protect people who may be vulnerable in the political process, the outsider, the minority, those who are vulnerable, those who don't have a lot of clout. . . . [S]ometimes we're only looking at academics or people who've been in the [lower courts]. If we can find people who have life experience and they understand what it means to be on the outside, what it means to have the system not work for them, that's the kind of person I want on the Supreme Court.

Later in March 2008, while on the campaign trail in Ohio, Obama again addressed the traits he would look for in a Supreme Court justice, suggesting he might leaven legal scholarship with practical political experience. He held up Earl Warren, a former governor of California who later became Chief Justice, as an example. Mr. Warren, he said, had had the wisdom to recognize that segregation was wrong less because of precise sociological effects and more so because it was immoral and stigmatized blacks:

I want people [like Earl Warren] on the bench who have enough empathy, enough feeling, for what ordinary people are going through.

Later, however, Obama seemed to step away from the example of Warren. In an interview with the editorial board of the Detroit Free Press on October 2, 2008, Obama said:

There were a lot of justices on the Warren Court who were heroes of mine ... Warren himself, Brennan, (Thurgood) Marshall. But that doesn’t necessarily mean that I think their judicial philosophy is appropriate for today . . . In fact, I would be troubled if you had that same kind of activism in circumstances today.

Instead, Obama mentioned then current justices David Souter and Stephen Breyer as examples of people he would like to nominate to the Supreme Court in the future:

. . . [W]hen I think about the kinds of judges who are needed today, it goes back to the point I was making about common sense and pragmatism as opposed to ideology.

I think that Justice Souter, who was a Republican appointee, Justice Breyer, a Democratic appointee, are very sensible judges. They take a look at the facts and they try to figure out: How does the Constitution apply to these facts? They believe in fidelity to the text of the Constitution, but they also think you have to look at what is going on around you and not just ignore real life.

That, I think is the kind of justice that I’m looking for – somebody who respects the law, doesn’t think that they should be making law ... but also has a sense of what’s happening in the real world and recognizes that one of the roles of the courts is to protect people who don’t have a voice.

In the third and final presidential debate with Republican nominee John McCain on October 15, 2008, Obama also implied that he would look for a Supreme Court nominee with previous judicial experience:

I will look for those judges who have an outstanding judicial record, who have the intellect, and who hopefully have a sense of what real-world folks are going through.

=== Court demographics ===
Demographic considerations have played into the appointment of Supreme Court justices since the institution was established. Starting in the 20th century, these concerns shifted from geographic representation to issues of gender and ethnicity.

Prior to the 2008 presidential election, many court watchers suggested that the next president would be under significant pressure to appoint another woman or ethnic minority to the court. The calls for naming more women were particularly widespread given the recent retirement of Sandra Day O'Connor and the rapidly changing demographics of the legal community, with women now accounting for about a fifth of all law partners and law school deans, a quarter of the federal bench, and nearly half of all law school graduates. Shortly before the election, for example, NPR reported, "Most observers of the Supreme Court agree about one thing: The next nominee is likely to be a woman". Furthermore, after Obama's presidential election victory, Hispanic legal interests groups such as the Hispanic National Bar Association began urging Obama to nominate a Hispanic justice.

Given the relative youth of the most recent Republican appointments, it was also noted that Democrats had "a strong incentive to pick younger justices this time around". Age proved to be an important consideration for Obama, who was "looking for a justice who will be an intellectual force on the court for many years to come". As a result, Obama did not seriously consider candidates such as José A. Cabranes, Amalya Kearse, Diana Gribbon Motz, David Tatel, and Laurence Tribe, all of whom he respected but were older than 65 when Obama was looking to replace David Souter.

With the retirement of Justice Stevens, some commentators directed focus on the religious make-up of the court. Upon Justice Stevens' retirement, the Court lacked any Protestant members, marking the first time in its history that it will be exclusively composed of Jewish and Catholic Justices.

== Sonia Sotomayor nomination ==
On May 26, 2009, Obama announced Second Circuit appeals court judge Sonia Sotomayor as his choice to replace retiring Associate Justice David H. Souter. Sotomayor's nomination was submitted to the United States Senate on June 1, 2009, when the 111th Congress reconvened after its Memorial Day recess. Sotomayor was confirmed by the Senate on August 6, 2009, by a vote of 68–31, and was sworn in as an Associate Justice on August 8, 2009.

=== David Souter retirement ===
Long before the election of President Obama, Associate Justice David H. Souter had expressed a desire to leave Washington, D.C., and return to his native New Hampshire. The election of a Democratic president in 2008 made Souter more inclined to retire, but he did not want to create a situation in which there would be multiple vacancies at once. Souter apparently became satisfied that no other justices planned to retire at the end of the Supreme Court's term in June 2009. As a result, in mid-April 2009 he privately notified the White House of his intent to retire from the Supreme Court at the conclusion of its business for that term. Souter submitted a resignation letter to Obama on May 1, who later that day made an unscheduled appearance during the daily White House press briefing to publicly announce Souter's retirement.

=== Short list ===
Obama began the process of identifying potential Supreme Court nominees shortly after his election in 2008, before a Supreme Court vacancy was actually known. White House Counsel Greg Craig helped assemble an early list of possible names. Once the White House had learned of Souter's plans to retire, two members of the Vice President's staff, Chief of Staff Ron Klain and Counsel Cynthia Hogan, ran the daily operations of the selection process.

Within a week of Souter's announcement the White House had formalized its short list of candidates to replace Souter, with Judge Sonia Sotomayor of the Second Circuit, Judge Diane Pamela Wood of the Seventh Circuit, and Solicitor General Elena Kagan reportedly leading contenders for the nomination. Homeland Security Secretary Janet Napolitano, California Supreme Court Justice Carlos Moreno, and Michigan Governor Jennifer Granholm were also reportedly on the short list of candidates under serious consideration by the White House. Chief Justice Leah Ward Sears of the Georgia Supreme Court, Judge Merrick B. Garland of the United States Court of Appeals for the District of Columbia Circuit, and Judge Ruben Castillo of the Federal District Court for the Northern District in Illinois were also on the final list of nine candidates. Joanne A. Epps, dean at Temple University Beasley School of Law was a contender according to NPR.

=== Interviews ===
Obama had not interviewed any of the candidates before May 18, but that week saw a flurry of activity and speculation surrounding possible interviews of candidates. Jennifer Granholm attended a CAFE standards meeting at the White House on May 19 and spoke with Obama, but officials would not comment on whether the two discussed a potential court appointment. On May 20, Diane Wood and Elena Kagan attended a conference on judicial independence at Georgetown University hosted by retired Associate Justice Sandra Day O'Connor. Ultimately, Obama winnowed his list to four individuals, all of them women: Sotomayor, Wood, Kagan, and Napolitano. Obama conducted hour-long one-on-one interviews with the four finalists, meeting with Wood and Kagan on May 19, and Sotomayor and Napolitano on May 21. Vice President Joe Biden also interviewed the four finalists.

Obama telephoned Judge Sotomayor at 9 pm EST on May 25 to alert her that she was his choice. Later that night, he called the other three finalists and informed them of his decision. Obama announced the nomination the next morning in the East Room of the White House in a press conference alongside Sotomayor and Joe Biden.

== Elena Kagan nomination ==
On May 10, 2010, Obama nominated Elena Kagan, the Solicitor General of the United States, to replace retiring Associate Justice John Paul Stevens. Solicitor General Elena Kagan was confirmed by the Senate by a 63–37 vote.

=== John Paul Stevens retirement ===
On April 9, 2010, Associate Justice John Paul Stevens announced that he would retire at the conclusion of the Supreme Court's term in June 2010. This announcement had been widely anticipated since September 2009 when Stevens confirmed that he had hired only a single law clerk for the Supreme Court term beginning in October 2010. (Full-time associate justices are allowed up to four law clerks while retired justices have only one.)

=== Short list ===
Before the announcement, the White House had been preparing for another possible Supreme Court vacancy, with White House Press Secretary Robert Gibbs responding to speculation about a possible Stevens retirement by saying "We'll be ready." After Stevens announced his retirement, an anonymous White House official said that about ten people were under consideration. The leading contenders to replace Stevens were said to include Seventh Circuit Judge Diane Pamela Wood and Solicitor General Elena Kagan, both of whom had been interviewed for the David Souter vacancy, and D.C. Circuit Judge Merrick B. Garland, who had also been considered for the Souter vacancy. Others mentioned include Ninth Circuit Judge Sidney Runyan Thomas, former Georgia Chief Justice Leah Ward Sears, Michigan Governor Jennifer Granholm and Homeland Security Secretary Janet Napolitano.

=== Interviews ===
Early in April 2010, Obama conducted a White House interview with Merrick Garland. On April 29, 2010, Obama and Vice President Joe Biden each met separately with Sidney Thomas at the White House to discuss the vacancy. Elena Kagan was interviewed the following day, and Diane Wood the following week on May 4.

== Merrick Garland nomination ==
On March 16, 2016, Obama nominated Merrick Garland, Chief Judge of the United States Court of Appeals for the District of Columbia Circuit, to replace Antonin Scalia. On February 23, 2016, the 11 Republican members of the Senate Judiciary Committee signed a letter to Senate majority leader Mitch McConnell stating their intention to withhold consent on any nominee made by President Obama, and that no hearings would occur until after January 20, 2017, when the next president takes office. The 11 members were Committee Chair Chuck Grassley of Iowa, Orrin Hatch and Mike Lee of Utah, Jeff Sessions of Alabama, Lindsey Graham of South Carolina, John Cornyn and Ted Cruz of Texas, Jeff Flake of Arizona, David Vitter of Louisiana, David Perdue of Georgia, and Thom Tillis of North Carolina. After Garland's nomination, McConnell reiterated his position that the Senate would not confirm any Supreme Court nomination from Obama. Garland's nomination expired on January 3, 2017.

=== Antonin Scalia death ===
On February 13, 2016, Associate Justice Antonin Scalia was found dead while vacationing at Cibolo Creek Ranch near Marfa, Texas. President Obama stated that he planned to nominate someone to replace Scalia on the Supreme Court. Scalia's death marked just the second time in sixty years that a sitting justice died.

=== Short list ===
The White House vetted a number of candidates that had previously received broad support from Republicans, including D.C. Circuit Judges Merrick Garland and Sri Srinivasan, Eighth Circuit Judge Jane L. Kelly, Ninth Circuit Judge Paul J. Watford, and Judge Ketanji Brown Jackson of the United States District Court for the District of Columbia. On March 11, Reuters reported that Obama had narrowed his list down to three candidates: Srinivasan, Garland, and Watford.

== Names mentioned as likely nominees ==
Following is a list of individuals who were mentioned in various news accounts as the most likely potential nominees for a Supreme Court appointment under Obama:

=== United States courts of appeals ===
Courts of Appeals

- Court of Appeals for the D.C. Circuit
  - Merrick Garland (born 1952) (nomination expired)
  - Sri Srinivasan (born 1967)
  - Patricia Millett (born 1963)
  - Robert L. Wilkins (born 1963)
- Court of Appeals for the 1st Circuit
  - David J. Barron (born 1967)
- Court of Appeals for the 2nd Circuit
  - Sonia Sotomayor (born 1954) (nominated and confirmed)
  - Robert Katzmann (1953–2021)
- Court of Appeals for the 7th Circuit
  - Ann Claire Williams (born 1949)
  - Diane Wood (born 1950)
- Court of Appeals for the 8th Circuit
  - Jane L. Kelly (born 1964)
- Court of Appeals for the 9th Circuit
  - M. Margaret McKeown (born 1951)
  - Jacqueline Nguyen (born 1965)
  - Johnnie B. Rawlinson (born 1952)
  - Sidney R. Thomas (born 1953)
  - Kim McLane Wardlaw (born 1954)
  - Paul J. Watford (born 1967)
- Court of Appeals for the 11th Circuit
  - Adalberto Jordan (born 1961)

=== United States district courts ===
- Ketanji Brown Jackson (born 1970) – district judge, United States District Court for the District of Columbia (subsequently nominated by Joe Biden and confirmed in 2022)
- Christine Arguello (born 1955) – district judge, United States District Court for the District of Colorado
- Rubén Castillo (born 1954) – former district judge, United States District Court for the Northern District of Illinois
- Diane Humetewa (born 1964) – district judge, United States District Court for the District of Arizona

=== State supreme courts ===
- Mariano-Florentino Cuéllar (born 1972) – associate justice, Supreme Court of California
- Goodwin Liu (born 1970) – associate justice, Supreme Court of California
- Carlos R. Moreno (born 1948) – former United States ambassador to Belize, former associate justice, Supreme Court of California; former judge, United States District Court for the Central District of California
- Leah Ward Sears (born 1955) – former chief justice, Georgia Supreme Court

=== Executive branch ===
- Hillary Clinton (born 1947) – 67th Secretary of State; former Senator from New York, First Lady and Chair of the Legal Services Corporation
- Elena Kagan (born 1960) – 45th Solicitor General; former dean of Harvard Law School (nominated and confirmed)
- Harold Hongju Koh (born 1954) – former Legal Adviser of the Department of State; former dean of Yale Law School
- Loretta Lynch (born 1959) – 83rd United States Attorney General
- Janet Napolitano (born 1957) – president of the University of California; 3rd Secretary of Homeland Security; former Governor of Arizona; former Arizona Attorney General; former United States attorney for the District of Arizona
- Kathryn Ruemmler (born 1971) – former White House Counsel; former principal associate deputy attorney general
- Ken Salazar (born 1955) – 50th Secretary of the Interior; former Senator from Colorado; former Colorado Attorney General
- Cass Sunstein (born 1954) – former administrator of the Office of Information and Regulatory Affairs

=== United States senators ===
- Cory Booker (born 1969) – Senator from New Jersey; former Mayor of Newark, New Jersey
- Amy Klobuchar (born 1960) – Senator from Minnesota; former county attorney for Hennepin County, Minnesota
- Claire McCaskill (born 1953) – Senator from Missouri; former State Auditor of Missouri; former county prosecutor for Jackson County, Missouri; former member of the Missouri House of Representatives

=== United States governors ===
- Jennifer Granholm (born 1959) – 47th Governor of Michigan; former Michigan Attorney General; former assistant United States attorney
- Deval Patrick (born 1956) – 71st Governor of Massachusetts; former assistant attorney general for the Civil Rights Division
- Brian Sandoval (born 1963) – 29th governor of Nevada; former district judge, United States District Court for the District of Nevada; former attorney general of Nevada

=== State executive branches ===
- Kamala Harris (born 1964) – former California Attorney General (would later become a U.S. senator from California in 2017 and Vice President of the United States in 2021)

=== Supreme Court litigators ===
- Caitlin Halligan (born 1966) – Former judicial nominee for the United States Court of Appeals for the District of Columbia Circuit; former Solicitor General of New York (would later become a Judge on the New York Court of Appeals)
- Seth P. Waxman (born 1951) – partner with WilmerHale; former Solicitor General

=== Academics ===
- Pamela S. Karlan (born 1959) – professor, Stanford Law School
- Kathleen Sullivan (born 1955) – professor and former dean, Stanford Law School; partner with Quinn Emanuel
- Joanne A. Epps (born 1951) - professor, dean, Temple University Beasley School of Law (would later become Temple University 13th President in 2023).

== See also ==
- United States federal judge
- Judicial appointment history for United States federal courts
