= Telemarketing and Consumer Fraud and Abuse Prevention Act =

Federal law in the United States

The Telemarketing and Consumer Fraud and Abuse Prevention Act (Pub. L. 103–297) is a federal law in the United States aimed at protecting consumers from telemarketing deception and abuse. The act is enforced by the Federal Trade Commission. The act expanded controls over telemarketing and gave more control to prescribe rules to the Federal Trade Commission. After the passage of the act, the Federal Trade Commission is required to (1) define and prohibit deceptive telemarketing practices; (2) keep telemarketers from practices a reasonable consumer would see as being coercive or invasions of privacy; (3) set restrictions on the time of day and night that unsolicited calls can be made to consumers; (4) to require the nature of the call to be disclosed at the start of any unsolicited call that is made with the purpose of trying to sell something.

== Background ==
The Telemarketing and Consumer Fraud and Abuse Prevention Act was deemed necessary in an advancing world. With the new waves of telemarketing and digital data Congress found that there are unique differences in telemarketing that deem new rules and regulations necessary.

=== Congressional Findings ===
It was determined that Telemarketing is different from other sales activities due to the fact that sales activities can be carried out by sellers across state lines without direct contact with the consumer. Telemarketers also can be very mobile, easily moving from state to state. With this being stated it is easy to see how there has been a rise in telemarketing fraud, which was found to be of such a magnitude that the Federal Trade Commission needed more resources to deal with it. There was found to be an estimated $40 billion a year lost to telemarketing fraud, and that consumers are victimized by non-monetary forms of telemarketing fraud as well. It was concluded that Congress should enact legislation to offer consumers protection from these telemarketing threats.

== Enforcement and Challenges ==
As part of complying with the act the Federal Trade Commission put new provisions on telemarketing. These new regulations include the Do Not Call (DNC) provisions and the Telemarketing Sales Rule (TSR). However, with the establishment of these provisions, companies objected to it and some filed suits arguing their rights as a business were being infringed upon. While the 10th circuit court ruled in favor of industry in regards to rules on customer proprietary network information earlier making it seem as though industry was going to win all consumer data cases; when industry objected to the DNC the court ruled in favor of the government stating that the Federal Trade Commission has a right to make and enforce the DNC provision.

In April 2018, a divided panel of the United States Court of Appeals for the District of Columbia Circuit found that the FTC had not violated the Administrative Procedure Act when it issued a 2016 staff letter reversing the conclusion of a 2009 staff letter that had found use of soundboard technology did not violated the act.
