= Meshal v. Higgenbotham =

US interrogation torture lawsuit

- Court: United States District Court for the District of Columbia
- Started: November 10, 2009; 16 years ago
- Docket nos.: 1:09-cv-02178 (D.D.C.); 14-5194 (D.C. Cir.); 15-1461 (Supreme Court)

Case history
- Appealed to: United States Court of Appeals for the District of Columbia Circuit
- Subsequent action: Dismissal upheld on appeal in October 2015
- Argument: May 1, 2015 (appeal)

Outcome
- Dismissed on June 13, 2014; 12 years ago

Court membership
- Judge sitting: Emmet G. Sullivan

Case opinions
- Decision by: Janice Rogers Brown
- Concurrence: Brett Kavanaugh
- Dissent: Cornelia Pillard

Keywords
- Bivens v. Six Unknown Named Agents; Torture Victim Protection Act of 1991; Fourth Amendment; Fifth Amendment

Meshal v. Higgenbotham is a U.S. federal lawsuit filed by the American Civil Liberties Union on behalf of Amir Mohamed Meshal, a natural born citizen of the United States, charging two agents of the Federal Bureau of Investigation (FBI), Chris Higgenbotham and Steve Hersem, and two other unknown U.S. government officials for their roles in subverting Meshal's rights under the United States Constitution and the Torture Victim Protection Act of 1991.

== Allegations ==
In January 2007, while fleeing to Kenya after the fighting broke out in the War in Somalia (2006–2009) in December 2006, Meshal was captured by forces of the Combined Joint Task Force – Horn of Africa. In the lawsuit, Meshal alleges he was "interrogated more than thirty times by U.S. officials who failed to adhere to the most elementary requirements of the Fourth and Fifth Amendments and the Torture Victim Protection Act of 1991" and "U.S. officials repeatedly threatened Mr. Meshal with torture, forced disappearance, and other serious harm".

== Court decisions ==
Meshal filed a legal action for violation of his rights in 2009. In 2014 a lower court dismissed the case. On October 23, 2015, the U.S. Court of Appeals for the District of Columbia Circuit upheld the lower court decision, (with a Dissenting opinion filed by Circuit Judge Pillard.). The ruling said that Amir Meshal's allegations of abuse were "quite troubling," but stated that he is unable to pursue claims that agents violated his constitutional rights because the events took place overseas during a terrorism investigation. The court stated: "Matters touching on national security and foreign policy fall within an area of executive action where courts hesitate to intrude absent congressional authorization."

In the New York Times, Patrick G. Eddington concludes "Mr. Meshal has fallen into a legal black hole, where the light of justice is extinguished in the name of national security. The appellate court decision means that American citizens have no means available to hold the government accountable for violating their constitutional rights, simply because the United States conveniently denied those rights in another country of its choosing."

In June 2017, the Supreme Court declined to hear the case.
