= Torture Victim Protection Act of 1991 =

United States law

- Long title: An Act to carry out obligations of the United States under the United Nations Charter and other international agreements pertaining to the protection of human rights by establishing a civil action for recovery of damages from an individual who engages in torture or extrajudicial killing.
- Acronyms (colloquial): TVPA
- Enacted by: the 102nd United States Congress
- Effective: March 12, 1992

Citations
- Public law: 102-256
- Statutes at Large: 106 Stat. 73

Codification
- Titles amended: 28 U.S.C.: Judiciary and Judicial Procedure
- U.S.C. sections created: 28 U.S.C. ch. 85 § 1350 note

Legislative history
- Introduced in the House as H.R. 2092 by Gus Yatron (D–PA) on April 24, 1991; Committee consideration by House Foreign Affairs, House Judiciary; Passed the House on November 25, 1991 (agreed voice vote); Passed the Senate on March 3, 1992 (passed voice vote); Signed into law by President George H. W. Bush on March 12, 1992

United States Supreme Court cases
- Mohamad v. Palestinian Authority, 566 U.S. 449 (2012); Cisco Systems, Inc. v. Doe, No. 24-856, 609 U.S. ___ (2026)

The Torture Victim Protection Act of 1991 (TVPA; Pub. L. 102–256, H.R. 2092, 106 Stat. 73, enacted March 12, 1992) is a US statute that allows for the filing of civil suits in the United States against individuals who, acting in an official capacity for any foreign nation, committed torture and/or extrajudicial killing. The statute requires a plaintiff to show exhaustion of local remedies in the location of the crime, to the extent that such remedies are "adequate and available." Plaintiffs may be U.S. citizens or non-U.S. citizens.

Although the Act was not passed until early 1992, it was introduced the previous year, and the official name of the Act is the "Torture Victim Protection Act of 1991."

== Legal issues ==
In 1992, Sister Dianna Ortiz was the first to file a case under the act, in a civil action against former general and Defense Minister Héctor Gramajo of Guatemala, contending that, by his command authority, he was responsible for her abduction, rape, and torture by military forces in Guatemala in November 1989. A federal court in Massachusetts ruled in her favor, awarding her $5 million in damages in 1995.

The TVPA has been used by victims of terrorism to sue foreign states that have been designated by the U.S. as state sponsors of terrorism, such as Iraq (which has since been removed from the list) and Iran. In May 2000, Miami based attorney Andrew C. Hall and clients David Daliberti, Bill Barloon, Chad Hall, Kenneth Beaty and their wives were awarded a collective sum of almost $19 million for the pains the men suffered in captivity. see Daliberti v. Republic of Iraq, 97 F.Supp.2d 38 (D.D.C. 2000); and also Weinstein v. Islamic Republic of Iran, 184 F.Supp.2d 13 (D.D.C. 2002). The Foreign Sovereign Immunity Act (FSIA), 28 U.S.C. §§ 1602–1611, prohibits foreign states from being sued in U.S. courts for most non-commercial issues.

The Antiterrorism and Effective Death Penalty Act of 1996 (AEDPA), 28 U.S.C. § 1605(a)(7), created an exception to the FSIA, allowing U.S. nationals to sue foreign states if the state has been designated as a state sponsor of terrorism and if the plaintiff's injury has been caused by the state's support of a terrorist organization. Following the passage of the AEDPA, numerous suits have been filed against state sponsors of terrorism, particularly Iran. Because some courts have held that the AEDPA does not create a cause of action against foreign states, plaintiffs have used the TVPA and the AEDPA in concert, first using the AEDPA to provide an exception to a foreign state's sovereign immunity, and then using the TVPA to provide a cause of action.

The TVPA has also been used by victims of torture by agents of the United States. In Meshal v. Higgenbotham, a native-born American citizen alleges U.S. officials repeatedly threatened him with torture, forced disappearance, and other serious harm.

On April 18, 2012, in Mohamad v. Palestinian Authority, the United States Supreme Court unanimously ruled that the TVPA applies exclusively to natural persons and does not impose liability against any organizational entity. The court's decision was based on the statute's use of the word "individual", as distinguished from "person" (the latter of which is usually defined in U.S. law and statutes as meaning an individual or an organization). The court examined the word both in the context of its ordinary meaning and through the legislative history of the TVPA. The court noted that the original language of the TVPA bill had used the word "person" and that during a House committee markup, one of the bill's sponsors proposed an amendment "to make it clear we are applying it to individuals and not to corporations."

On July 7, 2023, in Doe I v. Cisco Systems, the United States Court of Appeals for the Ninth Circuit cited Mohamad in its decision, finding the TVPA provides a private right of action against those who aid and abet torture or killing. In Doe, Falun Gong practitioners alleged that they were victims of human rights abuses committed by the Chinese Communist Party and enabled by the technological assistance of Cisco and two Cisco executives.

In January 2026, in Cisco Systems, Inc. v. Doe I, the United States Supreme Court granted cert on whether the Alien Tort Statute (ATS) or TVPA allows a judicially-implied private right of action for aiding and abetting. The Supreme Court heard oral argument on April 28, 2026. On June 23, 2026, in a 6-3 ruling, the Court reversed the Ninth Circuit decision and remanded the case for further proceedings. The Court held that neither the ATS nor the TVPA imposes liability for aiding and abetting offenses.

== See also ==
- Alien Tort Statute
- Arar v. Ashcroft
