= Soundboard (computer program) =

Software for organizing and playing audio clips

A soundboard is a computer program, Web application, or device, formerly created in Adobe Flash, that catalogues and plays many audio clips. Soundboards are self-contained, requiring no outside media player. In recent years soundboards have been made available in the form of mobile apps available on iPhone App Store and Google Play. Since Adobe and web browser developers deprecated support for Flash, HTML5-based soundboards have gained popularity in recent years.

== Prank calling ==
Traditionally, builders take sound clips said by celebrities, fictional characters or victims of other prank calls and combine them into one software program. They are most often used in prank calls, when the caller uses the soundboard consisting of recorded spoken lines of another person, traditionally a celebrity or the voice of a well known person, but later on soundboards made up of the voices of previous victims themselves grew in popularity as well. The individual on the other end of the call is usually deceived into thinking that they are actually talking to a real person. In some cases, the victim associated with the prank call has no idea who the person from the soundboard is, with one famous example being Mitt Romney's son, Matt Romney, pranking his father by using a Arnold Schwarzenegger soundboard. Recordings of soundboard prank calls are popular on the web, especially on video sharing sites such as YouTube. Soundboard prank-calling is often done with caller ID spoofing or masking, to provide a high level of anonymity or impersonation. The goal is often to create confusion or test how long the victim(s) will remain on the phone. Most soundboard pranksters do not hang up the phone first, rather see how long it takes for the victim to hang up first.

== Live streaming ==
Soundboards are used during live streams on platforms such as Twitch, YouTube and Facebook Gaming, allowing streamers to play pre-recorded sound effects and other audio clips for their audience in real time. Soundboards can be integrated with broadcasting software such as OBS Studio and controlled using keyboard shortcuts or hardware controllers such as the Elgato Stream Deck.

Some live-streaming soundboards allow viewers to trigger sounds themselves as a form of audience interaction. Twitch has supported extensions that allow broadcasters to assign sounds to buttons which viewers can activate during a stream, including sounds triggered using Bits. Third-party streaming tools have also enabled viewer-triggered sound alerts through features such as Twitch Channel Points.

== Meme soundboards ==
Soundboards can be used to play audio clips associated with internet memes during conversations and multiplayer games. These clips function as audible reactions or jokes shared among participants.

In April 2023, Discord introduced an integrated soundboard that allowed users to play uploaded audio clips in server voice channels. Discord described the feature as an audio counterpart to custom emoji and stickers, allowing communities to express popular memes and in-jokes through sound.

== Social media pranks ==
Prerecorded sound effects have also been used in pranks shared on social media. In 2025, an "Apple Pay prank" circulated on TikTok, in which participants played a recording of the Apple Pay transaction sound while pretending to take money from another person's phone. Some instances resulted in confrontations and criticism that the prank could provoke a dangerous response.

== Other uses ==
The soundboard is also used to facilitate humor, highlighting some of celebrities' more unusual utterances, or allowing for juxtaposition or even "composition" of quotes and sounds that would otherwise not go together. The soundboard has also been used as a promotional tool for films, television shows, radio, products and more.

Call Centers are adopting soundboard technology. Though more limited in its scope and applications, soundboards are one type of agent-assisted automation, a specialized call center technology which improve productivity. For example, soundboards seem to be primarily used for outbound telemarketing. Because the technology effectively eliminates agent accents, the telemarketing work can be done by lower cost agents in offshore locations.

== Soundboard software for online games ==
Thanks to the popularization of online videogames and communication tools through the Internet, different soundboard software has appeared. Note the following developments: EXP Soundboard (open source and compatible with WAV and MP3 audio files) Soundpad, or with more features Noise-o-matic, Resanance or Voicemod (combining a voice changer, a voice generator and a soundboard in the same app.)

== List of soundboard software ==
Incomplete list of soundboard software
Application	License	Platform	Soundboard	Voice changer	Recorder	TTS	MIDI	Price	Free/trial edition
Soundpad	Proprietary	Microsoft Windows	Yes	No	No	Yes	No	"$4.99".	Yes, demo
Soundux	Open source	Microsoft Windows, Linux	Yes	No	No	No	No	"Free".	Yes
Noise-o-Matic	Proprietary	Microsoft Windows	Yes	Yes	Yes	Yes	No	"$7.99".	Yes, demo
Resanance	Proprietary	Microsoft Windows	Yes	No	No	No	Yes	"Free".	Yes
Voicemod	Proprietary	Microsoft Windows, iOS, Android (operating system)	Yes	Yes	No	No	No	Subscription-based	Yes, free edition
MyInstantPlay	Proprietary	Web browser, iOS, Android (operating system)	Yes	No	No	No	No	"Free".	Yes
SoundboardGuys	Proprietary	Web browser, iOS, Android (operating system)	Yes	No	No	No	No	"Free".	Yes
MemeSounds	Proprietary	Web browser, iOS, Android (operating system)	Yes	No	No	No	No	"Free".	Yes

== See also ==
- Cyberstalking
- Internet troll
- Internet Meme
