= List of Order of the Coif members =

The Order of the Coif is an honor society for law school graduates. It was founded at the University of Illinois College of Law in 1902. Following are some of its notable members.

== Academia ==
=== Presidents and chancellors ===
| Name | Chapter | Notability | Ref. |
|---|---|---|---|
| Sandy D'Alemberte | University of Florida Levin College of Law | president of Florida State University | |
| Pamela Gann | Duke University School of Law | president of Claremont McKenna College and dean of Duke University School of Law | |
| Randall W. Hanna | Florida State University College of Law | chief executive officer and dean of Florida State University Panama City | |
| Robert J. Harris | Yale Law School | chancellor of the Florida College System and mayor of the city of Ann Arbor | |
| Ruth Austin Knox | University of Georgia School of Law | president of Wesleyan College | |
| Larry Kramer | University of Chicago Law School | president of the William and Flora Hewlett Foundation and dean emeritus of Stanford Law School | |
| Gene Nichol | University of Texas School of Law | president of the College of William & Mary | |
| Harvey Perlman | University of Nebraska College of Law | chancellor of the University of Nebraska–Lincoln | |
| L. Timothy Perrin | Texas Tech University School of Law | president of Lubbock Christian University and senior vice president of Pepperdine University | |
| Kent Syverud | University of Michigan Law School | chancellor and president of Syracuse University | |
| William D. Underwood | University of Illinois College of Law | president of Mercer University | |

=== Deans ===
| Name | Chapter | Notability | Ref. |
|---|---|---|---|
| Herschel W. Arant | Yale Law School | dean of the University of Kansas School of Law and Moritz College of Law; judge of the U.S. Court of Appeals for the Sixth Circuit | |
| Henry Moore Bates | Northwestern University Pritzker School of Law | dean of the University of Michigan Law School for 29 years | |
| George F. Curtis | | founding dean of the University of British Columbia Faculty of Law | |
| John Eastman | University of Chicago Law School | professor and former dean at Chapman University School of Law | |
| John Hart Ely | Yale Law School | dean of Stanford Law School; professor at Yale Law School | |
| Jefferson B. Fordham | Yale Law School | dean of the University of Pennsylvania Law School and the Ohio State University Moritz College of Law | |
| Leon Green | University of Texas School of Law | dean of Northwestern University School of Law | |
| Lisa A. Kloppenberg | USC Gould School of Law | provost and interim president of Santa Clara University and dean of the Santa Clara University School of Law | |
| Larry Kramer | University of Chicago Law School | dean of Stanford Law School and president of the William and Flora Hewlett Foundation | |
| Troy A. McKenzie | New York University School of Law | dean and professor of law at the New York University School of Law | |
| Justin Miller | Alexander Blewett III School of Law at the University of Montana | dean of the USC Gould School of Law and Duke University School of Law and U.S. circuit judge of the U.S. Court of Appeals for the District of Columbia | |
| Robert K. Rasmussen | University of Chicago Law School | dean and chair at the USC Gould School of Law | |
| Lauren Robel | Indiana University Maurer School of Law | dean of the Indiana University Maurer School of Law | |
| Don W. Sears | Ohio State University Moritz College of Law | dean and professor emeritus of law at the University of Colorado Law School | |
| Paul L. Selby | Ohio State University Moritz College of Law | dean and professor emeritus at the West Virginia University College of Law | |
| Symeon C. Symeonides | Harvard Law School | Alex L. Parks Distinguished professor of law and dean emeritus at Willamette University College of Law | |

=== Professors ===
| Name | Chapter | Notability | Ref. |
|---|---|---|---|
| Thomas E. Baker | University of Florida College of Law | professor of law at the Florida International University College of Law | |
| Bernard Bell | Stanford Law School | professor of law and scholar at Rutgers School of Law–Newark | |
| Jack Bogdanski | Stanford Law School | professor at the Lewis & Clark Law School | |
| Carolyn Bratt | Syracuse University College of Law | emeritus law professor at the University of Kentucky | |
| James Cavalliaro | UC Berkeley School of Law | professor at Wesleyan University and Yale Law School | |
| Myanna Dellinger | University of Oregon School of Law | professor of law at the University of South Dakota Knudson School of Law | |
| Heidi Li Feldman | University of Michigan Law School | professor at Georgetown University Law Center | |
| Stephen M. Feldman | University of Oregon School of Law | professor at the University of Wyoming College of Law | |
| Robert L. Fischman | University of Michigan Law School | professor at the Indiana University Maurer School of Law | |
| Jeffrey L. Fisher | University of Michigan Law School | associate professor at Stanford Law School | |
| Michael R. Fontham | University of Virginia School of Law | professor at Tulane University School of Law and Paul M. Hebert Law Center | |
| Richard D. Freer | UCLA School of Law | professor of law at Emory University School of Law | |
| William Willard Gibson Jr. | University of Texas at Austin | professor at the University of Texas School of Law | |
| Roger Groot | University of North Carolina School of Law | professor of law at Washington and Lee University School of Law | |
| Maura R. Grossman | Georgetown University Law School | research professor at the David R. Cheriton School of Computer Science | |
| Richard Hasen | UCLA School of Law | professor at Loyola Law School | |
| Gail Heriot | University of Chicago Law School | professor at the University of San Diego School of Law | |
| Joseph L. Hoffmann | University of Washington School of Law | professor at the Indiana University Maurer School of Law | |
| William H. J. Hubbard | University of Chicago Law School | professor at the University of Chicago Law School | |
| M. Todd Henderson | University of Chicago Law School | professor at the University of Chicago Law School | |
| Alston Johnson | Louisiana State University Law Center | professor at the Louisiana State University Law Center | |
| Leo Katz | University of Chicago Law School | professor at the University of Pennsylvania Law School | |
| Mark Lemley | UC Berkeley School of Law | professor at Stanford Law School | |
| A. Leo Levin | University of Pennsylvania Law School | professor at the University of Pennsylvania Law School | |
| Wesley Liebeler | University of Chicago Law School | professor at the UCLA School of Law and Antonin Scalia Law School | |
| Jerry Markham | University of Kentucky College of Law | professor at the Florida International University College of Law | |
| Jerry L. Mashaw | Tulane University School of Law | Sterling Professor Emeritus at Yale University | |
| Andrew McClurg | University of Florida | professor at the Cecil C. Humphreys School of Law | |
| Celestine McConville | Georgetown University School of Law | professor at the Chapman University School of Law | |
| William Robert Ming | University of Chicago Law School | professor at University of Chicago Law School and Howard University School of Law | |
| Edward R. Morrison | University of Chicago Law School | professor at Columbia Law School | |
| Donna M. Nagy | New York University Law School | professor at the Indiana University Maurer School of Law | |
| Christopher Peterson | University of Utah | professor at the University of Utah S.J. Quinney College of Law | |
| Ronald J. Rychlak | Vanderbilt University Law School | professor at the University of Mississippi School of Law | |
| Hannah Clayson Smith | J. Reuben Clark Law School | senior fellow at the International Center for Law and Religion Studies | |
| Michael Tigar | UC Berkeley School of Law | professor of the Duke Law School, American University, and Washington College of Law | |
| William J. Winslade | UCLA School of Law | professor at the University of Texas Medical Branch | |

== Attorney general ==
| Name | Chapter | Notability | Ref. |
|---|---|---|---|
| Mark J. Bennett | Cornell Law School | attorney general of Hawaii, judge of the U.S. Court of Appeals for the Ninth Circuit | |
| Herbert Brownell Jr. | Yale Law School | United States attorney general and New York State Assembly | |
| Chauncey H. Browning Jr. | West Virginia University College of Law, | attorney general of West Virginia | |
| Robert Young Button | University of Virginia School of Law | attorney general of Virginia and Virginia Senate | |
| William A. Schnader | University of Pennsylvania Law School | attorney general of Pennsylvania | |
| Douglas M. Head | University of Minnesota Law School | attorney general of Minnesota, Minnesota House of Representatives | |
| Edward H. Levi | University of Chicago Law School | United States attorney general, president of the University of Chicago | |
| Gregory A, Phillips | University of Wyoming College of Law | Wyoming attorney general; judge of the U.S. Court of Appeals for the Tenth Circuit | |
| William Bradford Reynolds | Vanderbilt University Law School | U.S. assistant attorney general for the Civil Rights Division | |
| Phil Weiser | New York University School of Law | attorney general of Colorado | |

== Attorney, government ==
| Name | Chapter | Notability | Ref. |
|---|---|---|---|
| A. Lee Bentley III | University of Virginia School of Law | United States attorney for the Middle District of Florida | |
| Robert K. Hur | Stanford Law School | U.S. attorney for the District of Maryland; special counsel for the U.S. Department of Justice | |
| Michelle M. Pettit | Vanderbilt University Law School | assistant U.S. attorney from California | |
| Mimi Rocah | New York University Law School | district attorney for Westchester County, New York and legal analyst at NBC News and MSNBC | |
| Henry Wade | University of Texas School of Law | Dallas County district attorney | |
| Hilbert Philip Zarky | University of Wisconsin Law School | tax attorney for the U.S. Department of Justice | |

== Attorney, private practice ==
| Name | Chapter | Notability | Ref. |
|---|---|---|---|
| Douglas Arant | Yale Law School | attorney | |
| Robert L. Bridges | Boalt Hall School of Law | attorney who specialized in construction and corporate law | |
| Evan Chesler | New York University School of Law | attorney and a partner of Cravath, Swaine & Moore | |
| Frank Cicero Jr. | University of Chicago Law School | attorney | |
| Tom Cryer | Louisiana State University Law School | attorney | |
| William E. Grauer | Cornell Law School | partner in the law firm of Cooley LLP | |
| Mona Salyer Lambird | University of Maryland School of Law | attorney and first woman president of the Oklahoma Bar Association | |
| Paul Alan Levy | University of Chicago Law School | attorney at Public Citizen specializing in Internet-related free speech issues | |
| Russell M. Robinson II | Duke University School of Law | attorney | |
| Evan L. Schwab | University of Washington School of Law | attorney and law clerk to justice William O. Douglas of the Supreme Court of the U.S. | |
| Hannah Clayson Smith | J. Reuben Clark Law School | attorney with the firm Schaerr Jaffe; senior fellow at the International Center for Law and Religion Studies | |
| Stuart A. Summit | Ohio State University Moritz College of Law | attorney | |
| Larry E. Temple | University of Texas School of Law | attorney who served as White House counsel to President Lyndon B. Johnson | |
| Herbert Wachtell | New York University School of Law | co-founder of the law firm Wachtell, Lipton, Rosen & Katz | |
| Michael Wallace | University of Virginia School of Law | attorney | |
| Esther Wunnicke | George Washington University | attorney known for her defense of land rights | |

== Business ==
| Name | Chapter | Notability | Ref. |
|---|---|---|---|
| Louis W. Dawson | Cornell University School of Law | president of the Mutual Life Insurance Company of New York | |
| Mathias J. DeVito | University of Maryland School of Law | president and chief executive officer of The Rouse Company | |
| Bruce Downey | Ohio State University Moritz College of Law | chairman and chief executive officer of Barr Pharmaceuticals | |
| John B. Frank | University of Michigan Law School | vice chairman of Oaktree Capital Management | |
| Bruce Friedrich | Georgetown University Law Center | co-founder and president of The Good Food Institute | |
| Bruce Karsh | University of Virginia School of Law | chairman and chief executive officer of Oaktree Capital Management | |
| Benjamin H. Oehlert Jr. | University of Pennsylvania School of Law | senior vice president of The Coca-Cola Company; U.S. ambassador to Pakistan | |
| Andrew M. Rosenfield | University of Chicago Law School | president of Guggenheim Partners | |
| John Rowe | University of Wisconsin Law School | chairman and chief executive officer of Exelon | |

== Entertainment ==
| Name | Chapter | Notability | Ref. |
|---|---|---|---|
| Alafair Burke | Stanford Law School | crime novelist and professor of law at Maurice A. Deane School of Law | |
| Savannah Guthrie | Georgetown University Law Center | broadcast journalist and main co-anchor of the Today | |
| Mimi Rocah | New York University Law School | legal analyst at NBC News and MSNB; district attorney for Westchester County, New York | |
| Bruce Spizer | Tulane University Law School | expert and author on the Beatles | |

== Government ==
| Name | Chapter | Notability | Ref. |
|---|---|---|---|
| Jay Clayton | University of Pennsylvania Law School | chairman of the U.S. Securities and Exchange Commission | |
| Sean J. Cooksey | University of Chicago Law School | chairman of the Federal Election Commission; Counsel to the Vice President | |
| Jerome Frank | University of Chicago Law School | chairman of the Securities and Exchange Commission; judge of U.S. Court of Appeals for the Second Circuit | |
| Robert E. Freer | University of Cincinnati College of Law | chair of the Federal Trade Commission | |
| E. William Henry | Vanderbilt University Law School | chair of the Federal Trade Commission | |
| Mary Gardiner Jones | Yale Law School | commissioner of the Federal Trade Commission | |
| Deborah Platt Majoras | University of Virginia School of Law | chairman of the Federal Trade Commission | |
| Newton N. Minow | Northwestern University School of Law | chairman of the Federal Communications Commission | |
| Michael Mundaca | UC Berkeley School of Law | assistant secretary for tax policy in the U.S. Department of the Treasury | |
| Neal Sher | New York University School of Law | head of the U.S. Department of Justice Office of Special Investigations | |
| Travis Tygart | Southern Methodist University School of Law | chief executive officer of the U.S. Anti-Doping Agency | |
| William H. Webster | Washington University School of Law | director of the Federal Bureau of Investigation, director of Central Intelligence, and district judge of the U.S. District Court for the Eastern District of Missouri | |

== Judiciary ==
=== U.S. Supreme Court ===
| Name | Chapter | Notability | Ref. |
|---|---|---|---|
| Abe Fortas | Yale Law School | associate justice of the Supreme Court of the United States | |
| Sandra Day O'Connor | Stanford Law School | associate justice of the Supreme Court of the United States | |
| William Rehnquist | Stanford Law School | chief justice of the United States | |
| John Paul Stevens | Northwestern University Law School | associate justice of the Supreme Court of the United States | |

=== State Supreme Court ===
| Name | Chapter | Notability | Ref. |
|---|---|---|---|
| Robert G. Allbee | Drake University Law School | associate justice of the Iowa Supreme Court; chief judge of the Iowa Court of Appeals; and judge of the Iowa District Court for the 5th Judicial District | |
| David L. Baker | University of Iowa College of Law | justice of the Iowa Supreme Court | |
| Cameron Batjer | University of Utah College of Law | justice on the Supreme Court of Nevada | |
| Jane Bland | University of Texas School of Law | associate justice of the Supreme Court of Texas | |
| C. Haley Bunn | West Virginia University College of Law | justice of the Supreme Court of Appeals of West Virginia | |
| James H. Carter | University of Iowa College of Law | justice of the Iowa Supreme Court | |
| William B. Cassel | University of Nebraska College of Law | judge of the Nebraska Supreme Court | |
| Andrew D. Christie | University of Pennsylvania Law School | justice of the Delaware Supreme Court | |
| Caswell J. Crebs | University of Illinois College of Law | justice of the Illinois Supreme Court | |
| George R. Currie | University of Wisconsin Law School | chief justice of the Wisconsin Supreme Court | |
| Joseph E. Daily | Yale Law School. | chief justice of the Illinois Supreme Court; circuit judge in Illinois | |
| James L. Dennis | University of Virginia School of Law | justice of the Louisiana Supreme Court; judge of the U.S. Court of Appeals for the Fifth Circuit; Louisiana House of Representatives | |
| Pat DeWine | University of Michigan Law School | justice of the Ohio Supreme Court | |
| Allison H. Eid | University of Chicago Law School | justice of the Colorado Supreme Court; judge of the U.S. Court of Appeals for the Tenth Circuit | |
| Edward Fadeley | University of Oregon School of Law | justice of the Oregon Supreme Court; president of the Oregon State Senate | |
| Paul Farthing | University of Illinois Law School | chief justice of the Supreme Court of Illinois | |
| Frederick F. Faville | University of Iowa College of Law | chief justice of the Iowa Supreme Court | |
| John Cannon Few | University of South Carolina School of Law | justice of the South Carolina Supreme Court | |
| John F. Fontron | University of Kansas Law School | justice of the Kansas Supreme Court | |
| Greg G. Guidry | Louisiana State University Law Center | justice of the Louisiana Supreme Court; U.S. district judge of the U.S. District Court for the Eastern District of Louisiana | |
| Diana Hagen | S.J. Quinney College of Law | justice on the Utah Supreme Court | |
| Gregory J. Hobbs Jr. | UC Berkeley School of Law | justice of the Colorado Supreme Court | |
| Nathan Heffernan | University of Wisconsin Law School | chief justice of the Wisconsin Supreme Court | |
| Matthew W. Hill | University of Washington School of Law | chief justice of the Washington Supreme Court | |
| Laurance M. Hyde | University of Missouri School of Law | judge of the Supreme Court of Missouri | |
| D. Arthur Kelsey | William & Mary Law School | justice of the Supreme Court of Virginia | |
| Lawrence W. I'Anson | University of Virginia Law School | chief justice of the Supreme Court of Virginia | |
| Louis A. Lavorato | Drake University Law School | chief justice of the Iowa Supreme Court | |
| Gordon J. MacDonald | Cornell Law School | chief justice of the New Hampshire Supreme Court and Attorney General of New Hampshire | |
| Wiley Manuel | Hastings College of Law | associate justice of the Supreme Court of California | |
| Alex J. Martinez | University of Colorado Law School | associate justice of the Colorado Supreme Court | |
| David N. May | Drake University Law School | associate justice of the Iowa Supreme Court | |
| Christopher McDonald | University of Iowa College of Law | associate justice of the Iowa Supreme Court | |
| Thomas McHugh | West Virginia University College of Law | judge of the Supreme Court of Appeals of West Virginia | |
| Derek R. Molter | Indiana University Maurer School of Law | justice of the Indiana Supreme Court | |
| Bill Montgomery | Sandra Day O'Connor College of Law | justice of the Arizona Supreme Court | |
| George B. Nelson | George Washington University Law School | justice of the Wisconsin Supreme Court | |
| Kenneth J. O'Connell | University of Wisconsin Law School | chief justice of the Oregon Supreme Court | |
| Dana Oxley | University of Iowa College of Law | associate justice of the Iowa Supreme Court | |
| Barbara Pariente | George Washington University Law School | chief justice of the Florida Supreme Court | |
| Jill Pohlman | S.J. Quinney College of Law | justice of the Utah Supreme Court | |
| Frank Richman | Indiana University Maurer School of Law | justice of the Indiana Supreme Court | |
| John C. Roach | University of Kentucky College of Law | justice of the Kentucky Supreme Court | |
| Harold See | University of Iowa College of Law | associate justice of the Alabama Supreme Court | |
| Aaron A. F. Seawell | University of North Carolina Law School | judge in the North Carolina Supreme Court; North Carolina attorney general; North Carolina General Assembly | |
| Susie Sharp | University of North Carolina Law School | first female chief justice of the North Carolina Supreme Court | |
| Robert G. Simmons | University of Nebraska College of Law | chief justice of Nebraska Supreme Court and member of the U.S. House of Representatives | |
| Frederick N. Six | University of Kansas School of Law | justice of the Kansas Supreme Court; Kansas Court of Appeals | |
| Talbot Smith | University of Michigan Law School | justice of the Michigan Supreme Court; district judge in the U.S. District Court for the Eastern District of Michigan | |
| Bruce M. Snell Jr. | University of Iowa College of Law | justice of the Iowa Supreme Court | |
| Felix L. Sparks | University of Colorado Law School (honorary 2007) | associate justice of the Colorado Supreme Court; brigadier general in the Colorado Army National Guard | |
| Craig Stowers | UC Davis School of Law | chief justice of the Alaska Supreme Court | |
| David Stras | University of Kansas School of Law | associate justice of the Minnesota Supreme Court; judge of the U.S. Court of Appeals for the Eighth Circuit | |
| Edward C. Stringer | University of Minnesota Law School | associate justice of the Minnesota Supreme Court | |
| William Corwin Stuart | University of Iowa College of Law | justice of the Iowa Supreme Court; chief judge of the U.S. District Court for the Southern District of Iowa | |
| Hardy Summers | University of Oklahoma College of Law | associate justice of the Oklahoma Supreme Court | |
| Mathew Tobriner | Harvard Law School | associate justice California Supreme Court | |
| Roger J. Traynor | UC Berkeley School of Law | chief justice of California | |
| Harvey Uhlenhopp | University of Iowa College of Law | justice of the Iowa Supreme Court | |
| Arthur T. Vanderbilt | Columbia Law School | chief justice of the New Jersey Supreme Court; dean of New York University School of Law | |
| K. J. Wall | University of Kansas School of Law | justice of the Kansas Supreme Court | |
| Martha Lee Walters | University of Oregon School of Law | chief justice of the Oregon Supreme Court | |
| Thomas D. Waterman | University of Iowa College of Law | justice of the Iowa Supreme Court | |
| Elizabeth Weaver | Tulane University Law School | chief justice of the Michigan Supreme Court; judge of the Michigan Court of Appeals | |
| Joseph Weintraub | Cornell Law School | chief justice of the Supreme Court of New Jersey | |
| Charles F. Wennerstrum | Drake University Law School | chief justice of the Iowa Supreme Court | |
| Willis Whichard | University of North Carolina School of Law | associate justice of the North Carolina Supreme Court, North Carolina Senate, and North Carolina House of Representatives | |
| David Wiggins | Drake University Law School | justice of the Iowa Supreme Court | |
| Michael David Zimmerman | S.J. Quinney College of Law | chief justice of the Utah Supreme Court | |

=== U.S. Circuit Court ===
| Name | Chapter | Notability | Ref. |
|---|---|---|---|
| Robert A. Ainsworth Jr. | Loyola University New Orleans College of Law | judge of the U.S. Court of Appeals for the Fifth Circuit | |
| Stephen H. Anderson | University of Utah College of Law | judge of the U.S. Court of Appeals for the Tenth Circuit | |
| Robert E. Bacharach | | judge of the U.S. Court of Appeals for the Tenth Circuit | |
| Danny Julian Boggs | | judge of the U.S. Court of Appeals for the Sixth Circuit | |
| Elizabeth L. Branch | | judge of the U.S. Court of Appeals for the Eleventh Circuit | |
| Jean Sala Breitenstein | | judge of the U.S. Court of Appeals for the Tenth Circuit | |
| Daniel Bress | | judge of the U.S. Court of Appeals for the Ninth Circuit | |
| William Canby | | judge of the U.S. Court of Appeals for the Ninth Circuit | |
| James Marshall Carter | | judge of the U.S. Court of Appeals for the Ninth Circuit | |
| Charles Edward Clark | | chief judge of the U.S. Court of Appeals for the Second Circuit; dean of Yale Law School | |
| Raymond C. Clevenger | | judge of the U.S. Court of Appeals for the Federal Circuit | |
| James Braxton Craven Jr. | | judge of the U.S. Court of Appeals for the Fourth Circuit; chief judge of the U.S. District Court for the Western District of North Carolina | |
| W. Eugene Davis | | judge of the U.S. Court of Appeals for the Fifth Circuit | |
| Frank Easterbrook | | judge of the U.S. Court of Appeals for the Seventh Circuit | |
| Harry T. Edwards | | judge of the U.S. Court of Appeals for the District of Columbia Circuit | |
| Jerome Farris | | judge of the U.S. Court of Appeals for the Ninth Circuit | |
| Raymond C. Fisher | | judge of the U.S. Court of Appeals for the Ninth Circuit | |
| Betty Binns Fletcher | | judge of the U.S. Court of Appeals for the Ninth Circuit | |
| Rufus Edward Foster | Tulane University Law School | judge of the U.S. Court of Appeals for the Fifth Circuit | |
| Michelle Friedland | | judge of the U.S. Court of Appeals for the Ninth Circuit | |
| Douglas H. Ginsburg | University of Chicago Law School | chief judge of the U.S. Court of Appeals for the District of Columbia Circuit | |
| Herbert Funk Goodrich | | judge of the U.S. Court of Appeals for the Third Circuit | |
| Alfred Goodwin | | judge of the U.S. Court of Appeals for the Ninth Circuit; judge of the U.S. District Court for the District of Oregon; justice of the Oregon Supreme Court | |
| L. Steven Grasz | | judge of the U.S. Court of Appeals for the Eighth Circuit | |
| James Ho | University of Chicago Law School | judge of the U.S. Court of Appeals for the Fifth Circuit; solicitor general of Texas | |
| Frank M. Hull | | judge of the U.S. Court of Appeals for the Eleventh Circuit | |
| Sandra Segal Ikuta | | judge of the U.S. Court of Appeals for the Ninth Circuit | |
| Harvey M. Johnsen | University of Nebraska College of Law | judge of the U.S.Court of Appeals for the Eighth Circuit | |
| James Kenneth Logan | | judge of the U.S. Court of Appeals for the Tenth Circuit | |
| Carolyn B. McHugh | | judge of the U.S. Court of Appeals for the Tenth Circuit | |
| Monroe G. McKay | | judge of the U.S. Court of Appeals for the Tenth Circuit. | |
| Theodore McKee | | judge of the U.S. Court of Appeals for the Third Circuit | |
| Steven Menashi | | judge of the U.S. Court of Appeals for the Second Circuit | |
| Gilbert S. Merritt Jr. | | judge of the U.S. Court of Appeals for the Sixth Circuit | |
| Eric D. Miller | | judge of the U.S. Court of Appeals for the Ninth Circuit | |
| John Nalbandian | University of Virginia School of Law | judge of the U.S. Court of Appeals for the Sixth Circuit | |
| Ryan D. Nelson | | judge of the U.S. Court of Appeals for the Ninth Circuit | |
| Helen W. Nies | | chief judge of the U.S. Court of Appeals for the Federal Circuit | |
| John J. Parker | University of North Carolina School of Law | judge of the U.S. Court of Appeals for the Fourth Circuit | |
| James Dickson Phillips Jr. | | judge of the U.S. Court of Appeals for the Fourth Circuit | |
| S. Jay Plager | | judge of the U.S. Court of Appeals for the Federal Circuit | |
| A. Raymond Randolph | | judge of the U.S. Court of Appeals for the District of Columbia Circuit | |
| Beth Robinson | | judge of the U.S. Court of Appeals for the Second Circuit | |
| Michael Y. Scudder | Pritzker School of Law | judge of the U.S. Court of Appeals for the Seventh Circuit | |
| Joseph Tyree Sneed III | | judge of the U.S. Court of Appeals for the Ninth Circuit | |
| Sri Srinivasan | Stanford Law School | judge of the U.S. Court of Appeals for the District of Columbia Circuit | |
| Richard C. Stoll | | judge in 22nd Judicial District in Fayette, Kentucky Circuit Court | |
| George Thomas Washington | Yale Law School | judge of the U.S. Court of Appeals for the District of Columbia Circuit | |
| Kim McLane Wardlaw | UCLA School of Law | judge of the U.S. Court of Appeals for the Ninth Circuit and the U.S. District Court for the Central District of California | |
| Paul J. Watford | | judge of the U.S. Court of Appeals for the Ninth Circuit | |
| Diane Wood | | judge of the U.S. Court of Appeals for the Seventh Circuit | |

=== U.S. District Court ===
| Name | Chapter | Notability | Ref. |
|---|---|---|---|
| Alfred A. Arraj | University of Colorado Law School (honorary 1958) | judge of the U.S. District Court for the District of Colorado | |
| Barry Ashe | Tulane University Law School | judge of the U.S. District Court for the Eastern District of Louisiana | |
| Stanley Blumenfeld | UCLA School of Law | judge of the U.S. District Court for the Central District of California | |
| Nancy E. Brasel | University of Minnesota Law School | judge of the U.S. District Court for the District of Minnesota | |
| Michael Lawrence Brown | University of Georgia School of Law | judge of the U.S. District Court for the Northern District of Georgia | |
| William L. Campbell Jr. | University of Alabama School of Law | judge of the U.S. District Court for the Middle District of Tennessee | |
| Valerie E. Caproni | University of Georgia School of Law | judge of the U.S. District Court for the Southern District of New York | |
| Edward M. Chen | UC Berkeley School of Law | judge of the U.S. District Court for the Northern District of California | |
| Vince Chhabria | Boalt Hall School of Law | judge of the U.S. District Court for the Northern District of California | |
| William M. Conley | University of Wisconsin Law School | judge of the U.S. District Court for the Western District of Wisconsin | |
| Finis E. Cowan | University of Texas School of Law | judge of the U.S. District Court for the Southern District of Texas | |
| Toby Crouse | University of Kansas School of Law | judge of the U.S. District Court for the District of Kansas | |
| Thomas T. Cullen | William & Mary School of Law | judge of the U.S. District Court for the Western District of Virginia | |
| Theodore Roosevelt Dalton | Washington and Lee University (honorary 1968) | judge of the U.S. District Court for the Western District of Virginia | |
| John W. deGravelles | Paul M. Hebert Law Center | judge of the U.S. District Court for the Middle District of Louisiana | |
| Mary Dimke | Vanderbilt University Law School | judge for the U.S. District Court for the Eastern District of Washington | |
| Daniel D. Domenico | University of Virginia School of Law | judgeof the U.S. District Court for the District of Colorado | |
| Martin Leach-Cross Feldman | Tulane University Law School | judge of the U.S. District Court for the Eastern District of Louisiana | |
| Sharon L. Gleason | UC Davis School of Law | chief judge of the U.S. District Court for the District of Alaska | |
| Henry Norman Graven | University of Minnesota Law School | chief judge of the U.S. District Court for the Northern District of Iowa | |
| Ben Charles Green | Western Reserve University School of Law | judge of the U.S. District Court for the Northern District of Ohio | |
| Madeline Haikala | Tulane University School of Law | judge of the U.S. District Court for the Northern District of Alabama | |
| John C. Hinderaker | James E. Rogers College of Law | judge of the U.S. District Court for the District of Arizona | |
| Marcia Morales Howard | Fredric G. Levin College of Law | judge of the U.S. District Court for the Middle District of Florida | |
| Ellen Segal Huvelle | Boston College Law School | judge of the U.S. District Court for the District of Columbia | |
| David C. Joseph | Paul M. Hebert Law Center | judge of the U.S. District Court for the Western District of Louisiana | |
| William F. Jung | University of Illinois College of Law | judge of the U.S. District Court for the Middle District of Florida | |
| Steve Kim | Georgetown University Law Center | magistrate judge for the U.S. District Court for the Central District of California | |
| Dale A. Kimball | University of Utah College of Law | judge of the U.S. District Court for the District of Utah | |
| Tom Kleeh | West Virginia University College of Law | chief judge of the U.S. District Court for the Northern District of West Virginia | |
| Rachel Kovner | Stanford Law School | judge of the U.S. District Court for the Eastern District of New York | |
| Roberto Lange | Northwestern University School of Law | chief judge of the U.S. District Court for the District of South Dakota | |
| David F. Levi | Stanford University | chief judge of the U.S. District Court for the Eastern District of California; dean of the Duke University School of Law | |
| Amit Mehta | University of Virginia School of Law | judge of the U.S. District Court for the District of Columbia and judge on the U.S. Foreign Intelligence Surveillance Court | |
| Susie Morgan | Paul M. Hebert Law Center | judge of the U.S. District Court for the Eastern District of Louisiana | |
| Richard E. Myers II | University of North Carolina School | chief judge of the U.S. District Court for the Eastern District of North Carolina | |
| Jeremiah Neterer | | judge of the U.S. District Court for the Western District of Washington | |
| Howard C. Nielson Jr. | University of Chicago Law School | judge of the U.S. District Court for the District of Utah | |
| Carl J. Nichols | University of Chicago Law School | judge of the U.S. District Court for the District of Columbia | |
| Maryellen Noreika | University of Pittsburgh | judge of the U.S. District Court for the District of Delaware | |
| Martha M. Pacold | University of Chicago Law School | judge of the U.S. District Court for the Northern District of Illinois | |
| James D. Peterson | University of Wisconsin Law School | chief judge of the U.S. District Court for the Western District of Wisconsin | |
| Linda R. Reade | Drake University Law School | judge of the U.S. District Court for the Northern District of Iowa | |
| Albert L. Reeves | | chief judge of the U.S. District Court for the Western District of Missouri | |
| Stephanie M. Rose | University of Iowa College of Law | chief judge of the U.S. District Court for the Southern District of Iowa | |
| Amy St. Eve | Cornell Law School | judge of the U.S. Court of Appeals for the Seventh Circuit; judge of the U.S. District Court for the Northern District of Illinois | |
| Mark C. Scarsi | Georgetown University Law Center | judge of the U.S. District Court for the Central District of California | |
| Steven C. Seeger | University of Michigan Law School | judge of the U.S. District Court for the Northern District of Illinois | |
| Rebecca Beach Smith | William & Mary Law School | judge of the U.S. District Court for the Eastern District of Virginia | |
| Andrew H. Stone | S.J. Quinney College of Law | judge in the Third Judicial District Court of the State of Utah | |
| Leonard T. Strand | University of Iowa College of Law | chief judge of the U.S. District Court for the Northern District of Iowa | |
| Robert R. Summerhays | University of Texas School of Law | judge of the U.S. District Court for the Western District of Louisiana | |
| Indira Talwani | UC Berkeley School of Law | judge of the U.S. District Court for the District of Massachusetts | |
| Holly Teeter | University of Kansas School of Law | judge of the U.S. District Court for the District of Kansas | |
| Hubert Teitelbaum | University of Pittsburgh School of Law | chief judge of the U.S. District Court for the Western District of Pennsylvania | |
| Jon S. Tigar | UC Berkeley School of Law | judge of the U.S. District Court for the Northern District of California | |
| Anne Traum | University of California, Hastings College of the Law | judge of the U.S. District Court for the District of Nevada | |
| John J. Tuchi | Arizona State University College of Law | judge of the U.S. District Court for the District of Arizona | |
| James Clinton Turk | Washington and Lee University School of Law | judge of the U.S. District Court for the Western District of Virginia; Virginia Senate | |
| T. Kent Wetherell II | Florida State University College of Law | judge of the U.S. District Court for the Northern District of Florida | |
| Allen Winsor | University of Florida Levin College of Law | judge of the U.S. District Court for the Northern District of Florida | |

=== Court of Federal Claims ===
| Name | Chapter | Notability | Ref. |
|---|---|---|---|
| Charles F. Lettow | Stanford Law School | judge of the U.S. Court of Federal Claims | |
| J. Warren Madden | University of Chicago Law School | judge of the U.S. Court of Claims; chairman of the National Labor Relations Board | |
| James F. Merow | George Washington University Law School | judge of the U.S. Court of Federal Claims | |
| Christine Odell Cook Miller | University of Utah College of Law | judge of U.S. Court of Federal Claims | |
| Matthew H. Solomson | University of Maryland School of Law | judge of the U.S. Court of Federal Claims. | |

=== U.S. Tax Court ===
| Name | Chapter | Notability | Ref. |
|---|---|---|---|
| Renato Beghe | University of Chicago Law School | judge of the U.S. Tax Court | |
| Joseph Robert Goeke | University of Kentucky, College of Law | judge of the U.S. Tax Court | |
| David Gustafson | Duke University School of Law | judge of the U.S. Tax Court | |
| Lapsley W. Hamblen Jr. | University of Virginia School of Law | judge of the U.S. Tax Court | |
| Austin Hoyt | University of Virginia School of Law | judge of the U.S. Tax Court | |
| Alina I. Marshall | University of Pennsylvania Law School | judge of the U.S. Tax Court | |
| L. Paige Marvel | University of Maryland School of Law | judge of the U.S. Tax Court | |
| Cary Douglas Pugh | University of Virginia School of Law | judge of the U.S. Tax Court | |
| Michael B. Thornton | Duke University School of Law | judge of the U.S. Tax Court | |
| Emin Toro | University of North Carolina School of Law | judge of the U.S. Tax Court | |

=== Other federal courts ===
| Name | Chapter | Notability | Ref. |
|---|---|---|---|
| Frederick Bernard Lacey | Cornell Law School | judge of the U.S. Foreign Intelligence Surveillance Court and U.S. District Court for the District of New Jersey | |
| Isaac Jack Martin | University of Cincinnati College of Law | associate judge of the U.S. Court of Customs and Patent Appeals | |
| Patrick J. McNulty | University of Minnesota Law School | judge of the U.S. Bankruptcy Court for the District of Minnesota | |
| Amit Mehta | University of Virginia School of Law | judge on the U.S. Foreign Intelligence Surveillance Court and the U.S. District Court for the District of Columbia | |
| Suzanne Mitchell | George Washington University Law School | U.S. magistrate judge for the Western District of Oklahoma | |
| Neomi Rao | University of Chicago Law School | federal appellate judge on the U.S. Court of Appeals for the District of Columbia Circuit | |
| Jane A. Restani | University of California, Davis School of Law | chief judge of the U.S. States Court of International Trade | |
| Jonathan R. Steinberg | University of Pennsylvania Law School | judge of the U.S. Court of Appeals for Veterans Claims | |

=== Other state courts ===
| Name | Chapter | Notability | Ref. |
|---|---|---|---|
| Kristine Cecava | University of Nebraska–Lincoln College of Law | Cheyenne County, Nebraska district judge | |
| Jerry Elliott | University of Kansas School of Law | judge in the Kansas Court of Appeals | |
| Michael W. Hoover | University of Wisconsin Law School | deputy chief judge of the Wisconsin Court of Appeals District III | |
| Lisa Neubauer | University of Chicago Law School | chief judge of the e Wisconsin Court of Appeals District III | |
| William A. Reppy | University of Southern California Law School | associate justice of the California Court of Appeal, Second Appellate District | |
| Vijay Shanker | University of Virginia School of Law | judge of the District of Columbia Court of Appeals | |
| Kathryn Doi Todd | Loyola Law School | associate justice of the California Second District Court of Appeal, Division Two | |
| William R. Wooton | West Virginia University College of Law | justice of the West Virginia Supreme Court of Appeals, West Virginia Senate, and West Virginia House of Delegates | |

== Military ==
| Name | Chapter | Notability | Ref. |
|---|---|---|---|
| Henry C. Bruton | George Washington University Law School | U.S. Navy rear admiral | |
| Alfred Naifeh | University of Michigan Law School | U.S. Navy World War II hero | |
| Felix L. Sparks | University of Colorado Law School (honorary) | Colorado Army National Guard brigadier general and associate justice of the Colorado Supreme Court | |

== Politics ==
| Name | Chapter | Notability | Ref. |
|---|---|---|---|
| John D. Alderson | | U.S. House of Representatives | |
| E. Almer Ames Jr. | Washington and Lee School of Law | Virginia Senate | |
| Robert B. Anderson | University of Texas Law School | U.S. Secretary of the Treasury, U.S. Deputy Secretary of Defense, U.S. Secretary of the Navy, and Attorney General of Texas | |
| Howard Baker | University of Tennessee College of Law | U.S. ambassador to Japan, White House chief of staff, U.S. Senate | |
| Lucius D. Battle | Stanford Law School | U.S. ambassador to Egypt | |
| Homer Bone | | U.S. Senate, Washington House of Representatives, judge of the U.S. Court of Appeals for the Ninth Circuit | |
| John W. Bricker | Ohio State University College of Law | governor of Ohio, U.S. senator, attorney general of Ohio | |
| Peter S. Brunstetter | University of Virginia School of Law | North Carolina Senate | |
| Joseph A. A. Burnquist | University of Minnesota Law School | governor of Minnesota, lieutenant governor of Minnesota, attorney general of Minnesota | |
| M. Caldwell Butler | University of Virginia School of Law | U.S. House of Representatives and Virginia House of Delegates | |
| Mel Carnahan | University of Missouri School of Law | governor of Missouri, U.S. Senate, treasurer of Missouri | |
| Ralph Lawrence Carr | | governor of Colorado | |
| Happy Chandler | University of Kentucky College of Law | governor of Kentucky, U.S. senator, and commissioner of Baseball | |
| Virgil Chapman | University of Kentucky College of Law | U.S. Senate and U.S. House of Representatives | |
| Warren Christopher | Stanford Law School | U.S. secretary of state; U.S. deputy attorney general | |
| Bennett Champ Clark | George Washington University Law School | U.S. Senate and a U.S. circuit judge of the U.S. Court of Appeals for the District of Columbia Circuit | |
| Felix Cole | George Washington University Law School. | U.S. ambassador to Ceylon, U.S. minister to Ethiopia, and U.S. consul general in Warsaw | |
| Bert Combs | University of Kentucky College of Law | governor of Kentucky; judge of the U.S. Court of Appeals for the Sixth Circuit; justice of the Kentucky Court of Appeals | |
| James L. Connaughton | Northwestern University School of Law | George W. Bush administration environmental adviser and chairman of the White House Council on Environmental Quality | |
| Charles M. Dale | University of Minnesota Law School | governor of New Hampshire; New Hampshire Senate | |
| Tom Davis | University of Maryland School of Law | South Carolina Senate | |
| Jennifer Decker | University of Kentucky College of Law | Kentucky House of Representatives | |
| Forrest C. Donnell | University of Missouri School of Law | governor of Missouri, U.S. Senate | |
| John W. Eggleston | Washington and Lee University School of Law (honorary 1959) | Virginia Senate and chief justice of the Supreme Court of Virginia | |
| Joseph Bernard Gildenhorn | Yale Law School | U.S. ambassador to Switzerland | |
| Harrison J. Goldin | Yale Law School | New York State Senate and New York City comptroller | |
| Carte Goodwin | Emory University Law School | U.S. senator | |
| John W. Gwynne | University of Iowa College of Law | U.S. House of Representatives | |
| George J. Hatfield | Stanford University | lieutenant governor of California, California State Senate | |
| Charles A. Halleck | Indiana University at Bloomington | House majority leader, U.S. House of Representatives | |
| Josh Hsu | Georgetown University Law Center | special assistant to the president and counsel to Vice President Kamala Harris | |
| Mark Hutchison | Brigham Young University Law School | lieutenant governor of Nevada | |
| Lloyd G. Jackson II | West Virginia University College of Law | West Virginia Senate | |
| Harry P. Jeffrey | Ohio State University College of Law | U.S. House of Representatives | |
| Tim Johnson | University of Illinois College of Law | U.S. House of Representatives | |
| Charles R. Jonas | University of North Carolina School of Law | U.S. House of Representatives | |
| Russell B. Long | Louisiana State University Law Center | U.S. Senate | |
| William C. Marland | West Virginia University | governor of West Virginia, attorney general of West Virginia | |
| Thomas E. Martin | | U.S. Senate, U.S. House of Representatives | |
| Paul V. McNutt | Harvard Law School | governor of Indiana, U.S. ambassador to the Philippines, high commissioner to the Philippines, administrator of the Federal Security Agency | |
| Richard Nixon | Duke University School of Law | president of the United States; vice president of the United States, U.S. Senate, U.S. House of Representatives | |
| Covey T. Oliver | University of Texas School of Law | U.S. ambassador to Colombia; assistant secretary of state for Inter-American affairs | |
| Wyc Orr | University of Tennessee College of Law | Georgia House of Representatives | |
| Doug Overbey | University of Tennessee College of Law | Tennessee Senate, Tennessee House of Representatives, U.S. attorney for the Eastern District of Tennessee | |
| Watkins Overton | University of Chicago Law School | mayor of Memphis, Tennessee | |
| Victor Palmieri | Stanford Law School | ambassador-at-large | |
| David Pressman | New York University School of Law | U.S. ambassador to Hungary | |
| Stephen Rapp | Drake University Law School | U.S. ambassador-at-Large for War Crimes Issues; Iowa House of Representatives | |
| William P. Rogers | Cornell Law School | U.S. secretary of state and U.S. attorney general | |
| Jack Rust | University of Virginia School of Law | Virginia House of Delegates | |
| Nathan Sales | Duke University School of Law | ambassador-at-large and coordinator for counterterrorism and acting under secretary of state for Civilian Security, Democracy, and Human Rights | |
| Errett P. Scrivner | University of Kansas | U.S. House of Representatives | |
| Bill Seitz | University of Cincinnati College of Law | Ohio House of Representatives and Ohio Senate | |
| Fred J. Slater | University of Michigan Law School | New York State Senate and New York State Assembly | |
| Willis Smith | Duke University Law School | U.S. Senate and North Carolina House of Representatives | |
| Ted Sorensen | University of Nebraska College of Law | speechwriter and advisor for President John F. Kennedy | |
| William Spong Jr. | University of Virginia School of Law | U.S. Senate, Virginia Senate, and Virginia House of Delegates | |
| C. Tracey Stagg | Cornell Law School | New York State Senate | |
| Vernon W. Thomson | University of Wisconsin Law School | governor of Wisconsin, U.S. House of Representatives, and attorney general of Wisconsin | |
| Eric N. Vitaliano | New York University School of Law | New York State Assembly; judge of the U.S. District Court for the Eastern District of New York | |
| Dan Walker | Northwestern University School of Law | governor of Illinois | |
| Benson K. Whitney | University of Minnesota Law School | U.S. ambassador to Norway | |
| G. Mennen Williams | University of Michigan Law School | governor of Michigan, chief justice of the Michigan Supreme Court; U.S. ambassador to the Philippines | |
| Ralph Yarborough | University of Texas School of Law. | U.S. Senate | |

== Religion ==
| Name | Chapter | Notability | Ref. |
|---|---|---|---|
| H. Verlan Andersen | Stanford Law School | general authority of the Church of Jesus Christ of Latter-day Saints | |
| Stacy F. Sauls | University of Virginia School of Law | bishop of Lexington and CEO of the Episcopal Church | |

== Solicitor general ==
| Name | Chapter | Notability | Ref. |
|---|---|---|---|
| Gregory G. Garre | George Washington University Law School | solicitor general of the United States and partner in Latham & Watkins | |
| James C. Ho | University of Chicago Law School | solicitor general of Texas and judge of the U.S. Court of Appeals for the Fifth Circuit | |
| Maureen Mahoney | University of Chicago Law School | deputy solicitor general of the United States; appellate lawyer with Latham & Watkins | |
| Jonathan F. Mitchell | University of Chicago Law School | solicitor general of Texas | |
| Eric E. Murphy | University of Chicago Law School | solicitor general of Ohio and U.S. circuit judge of the U.S. Court of Appeals for the Sixth Circuit | |
| Theodore Olson | UC Berkeley School of Law | solicitor general of the United States | |
| Philip Perlman | University of Maryland School of Law | solicitor general of the United States and secretary of state of Maryland | |
| Sri Srinivasan | Stanford Law School | principal deputy solicitor general of the United States; chief judge of the U.S. Court of Appeals for the District of Columbia Circuit | |
| Ken Starr | Duke University School of Law | solicitor general of the United States; independent counsel for the impeachment of Bill Clinton | |
