= Reppy =

Reppy is a surname. Notable people with the surname include:

- John Reppy (born 1931), American physicist
- William A. Reppy (1912–2005), American judge
