= Frank A. Frost =

American politician

Frank Albert Frost (March 21, 1874 – August 31, 1947) was an American businessman and politician from New York.

== Life ==
He was born on March 21, 1874, in Watkins, Schuyler County, New York, the son of Charles Sherwood Frost (1835–1906) and Tressa Frost (1841–1923). On June 20, 1900, he married May C. Scoby (died 1923), and they had one daughter. In 1924, he married Edith R. Hill (1888–1963), and they had one daughter.

He engaged in the marble and granite business, and was a general contractor. He also engaged in printing and publishing, and was Postmaster of Watkins for eight years.

Frost was a member of the New York State Senate (41st D.) from 1929 to 1934, sitting in the 152nd, 153rd, 154th, 155th, 156th and 157th New York State Legislatures.

He died on August 31, 1947, in Clifton Springs, New York; and was buried at the Glenwood Cemetery in Watkins Glen.

== Sources ==
New York State Senate
Preceded by James S. Truman	New York State Senate; 41st District; 1929–1934	Succeeded by C. Tracey Stagg
