= Washington and Lee Law Review =

Quarterly law journal

The Washington and Lee Law Review is a law review published four times each year by the Washington and Lee University School of Law and founded in 1939. It presents lead articles contributed by leading scholars, judges, and lawyers, as well as student notes. Student writers are chosen during the summer after their first year of law school based upon grades and the results of a writing competition. Each staff writer develops a topic for original legal research, and writes over the course of the second year under the supervision of a faculty advisor and student editor. Selected writers continue as editors in the third year of law school.
