= Paul Paton (legal scholar) =

Paul Paton is a Canadian academic who specializes in the study of the ethics of law. From 2023 to October 2025, he served as the dean of the Chapman University School of Law at Chapman University. Paton received a bachelor's degree from the University of Toronto, a master's degree in international relations from the University of Cambridge, and a Doctor of Juridical Science degree from Stanford University. Before joining the faculty at Chapman University, he taught at the University of Alberta and the University of the Pacific's McGeorge School of Law, and served as an advisor to the premier of Ontario.
