= Washington and Lee University School of Law =

Private law school in Lexington, Virginia, US

Coordinates: 37°47′29.2″N 79°26′37.9″W

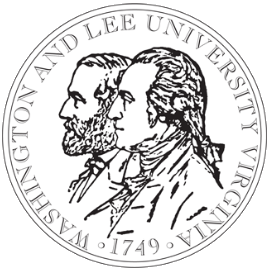
- Motto: Non incautus futuri (Latin) "Not Unmindful of the Future"
- Established: 1849; 177 years ago as Lexington Law School by John White Brockenbrough; 1866 (merger with Washington College)
- School type: Private law school
- Dean: Melanie D. Wilson
- Location: Lexington, Virginia, United States
- Enrollment: 380 (2023)
- Faculty: 37 full-time, 58 part-time (2023)
- USNWR ranking: 34th (tie) (2026)
- Bar pass rate: 83.33% (2023 first-time takers)
- Website: law.wlu.edu
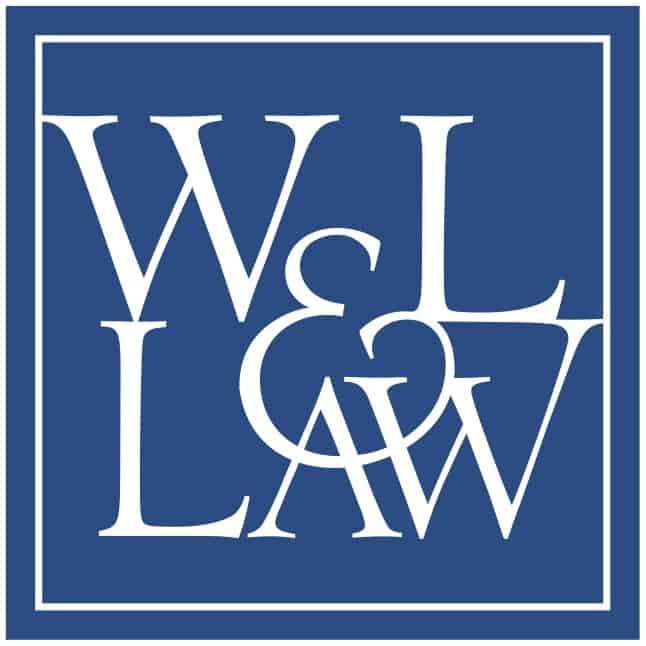

The Washington and Lee University School of Law (W&L Law) is the law school of Washington and Lee University, a private liberal arts college in Lexington, Virginia. It is accredited by the American Bar Association. Facilities are on the historic campus of Washington and Lee University in Sydney Lewis Hall. W&L Law has a total enrollment of 380 students in the Juris Doctor program as of 2023, and a 10-to-1 student-to-faculty ratio.

== History ==
The Lexington Law School, the precursor to W&L Law, was founded in 1849 by United States federal judge John White Brockenbrough and is the 16th oldest active law school in the United States and the third-oldest in Virginia. The law school was not integrated into Washington and Lee University (then known as Washington College) until after the Civil War when Robert E. Lee was president of the university. In 1866, Lee annexed the school, known at the time as the School of Law and Equity, to the college and appointed Judge Brockenbrough as the first dean. In 1870, after Lee's death, the School of Law and Equity was renamed the Washington and Lee University School of Law, in line with the college's name change in honor of Lee. Also in 1870, former Virginia Attorney General John Randolph Tucker was appointed to the faculty and later became Dean followed by his son Henry St. George Tucker III.

In 1900, the law school moved into the newly built Tucker Hall in memory of Dean Tucker. Tucker Hall also housed the law school's first law library—the Vincent L. Bradford Law Library. After significant periods of growth, the law school moved into the new Tucker Hall after the original building was destroyed in a fire and the law library was rebuilt with a grant from the Carnegie Corporation of New York. In 1920, W&L Law joined the Association of American Law Schools.

The Washington and Lee Law Review began publication in the autumn of 1939 and is still in regular publication. After World War II, enrollment increased despite a period of low enrollment during the war. In 1950, the School of Law established its chapter of the Order of the Coif, one of only 80 such chapters in the country. The School of Law admitted its first female students in 1972, and opened its current home, Sydney Lewis Hall, in 1977. In 1992, the Lewis F. Powell Jr. Wing was added to Sydney Lewis Hall and the Wilbur C. Hall Law Library at a dedication ceremony attended by Justice Powell and presided over by Chief Justice William Rehnquist.

In 2008, Dean Rodney Smolla announced the new third-year program, which became compulsory for W&L Law students in 2011 under Interim Dean Mark Grunewald. This new program turned the entire third year into an experiential curriculum that emphasizes practice, professionalism, and service. Nora Demleitner served as dean from 2012 through 2015, the first woman to hold the position, during which time the school completed its $35 million campaign, Honor Our Past, Build Our Future, renovated Lewis Hall, established the Washington, DC portion of W&L's third-year program, and significantly increased the employment and bar passage rates of its graduates. On July 1, 2015, Brant J. Hellwig became Dean of the law school, the 18th dean since 1849. Also in 2015, W&L Law formed an academic and professional partnership with the Future of Privacy Forum, an information privacy think tank in Washington, DC. The Future of Privacy Forum will facilitate professional, research, and curricular development, and the Washington, DC portion of W&L's third-year program will move into its offices.

== Facilities ==
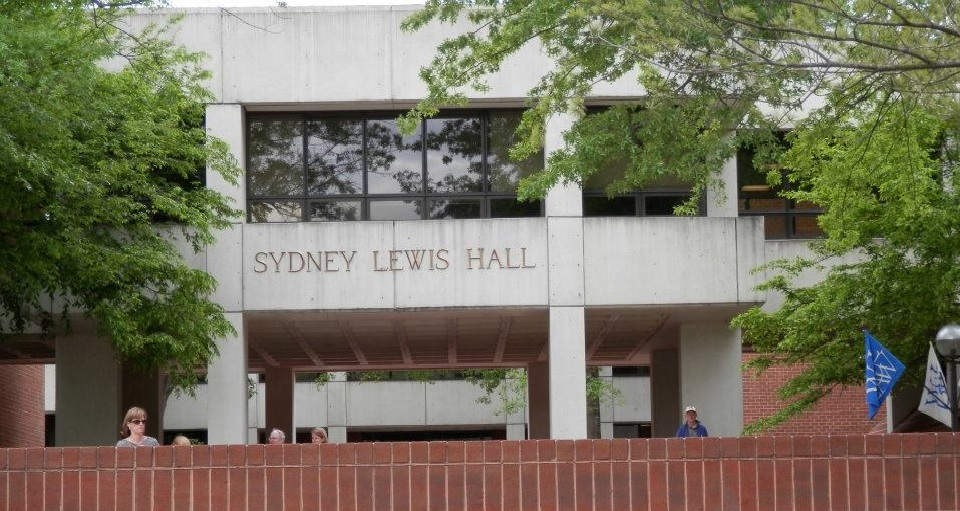
Sydney Lewis Hall

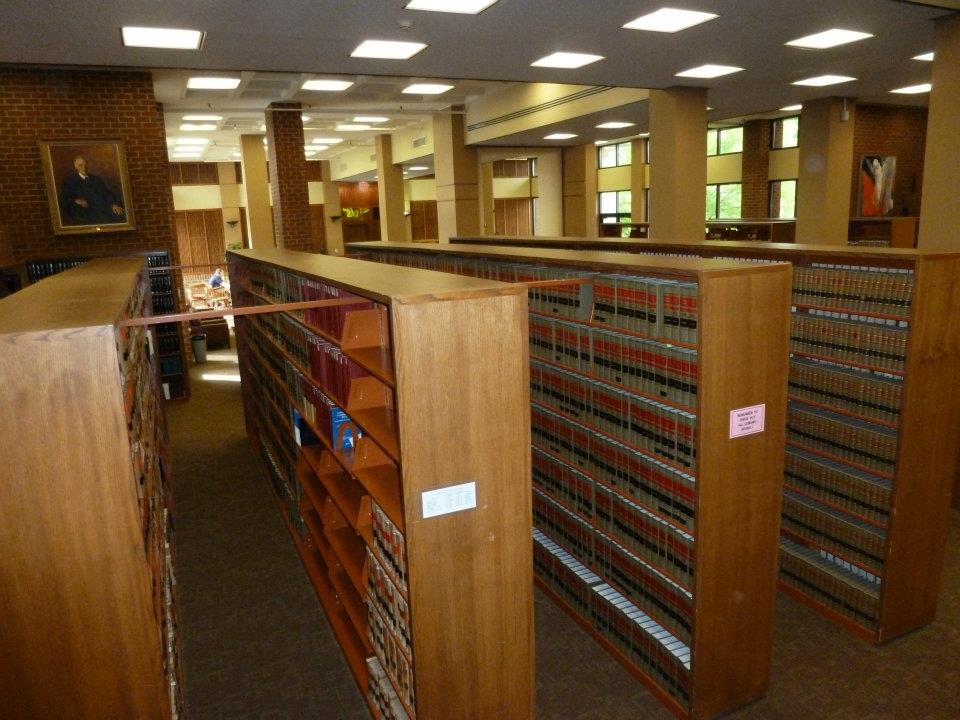
Wilbur C. Hall Law Library

Sydney Lewis Hall is the home of the school of law on the historic campus of Washington and Lee in Lexington, Virginia. Lewis Hall was built in 1977 with a $9 million gift from Best Products founder Sydney Lewis and his wife Frances of Virginia. Lewis Hall was designed by Marcellus Wright Cox & Smith Architects in the Mid-century modern style. In addition to lecture halls, classrooms, and offices for faculty and staff, Lewis Hall houses the 150-seat Millhiser Moot Courtroom with the accompanying Robert E. Stroud Judge's Chambers and the Roger D. Groot Jury Room. The Millhiser Moot Courtroom serves as the continuity of operations site for the United States Court of Appeals for the Federal Circuit. Lewis Hall also has a cafeteria for students, staff, and faculty called the Brief Stop, which serves food, snacks, and drinks.

As part of its $35 million campaign completed in 2015, Honor Our Past, Build Our Future, the School of Law renovated and modernized its facilities. The project resulted in more flexible space for student collaboration and study, new homes for four of the school's legal clinics and student organizations, more natural lighting, a new library reading room, a new high-tech trial courtroom, and an improved entry sequence and navigation for the building.

Lewis Hall's cornerstones are the Wilbur C. Hall Law Library and Lewis F. Powell Jr. Wing. The 58,155-square-foot (5,402.8 m^{2}) Wilbur C. Hall Law Library is a Federal Depository Library for the U.S. Government and includes a separate faculty library, a rare book room, and an audio-visual media center and is open 24-hours a day. The library houses more than 492,000 volumes and is unique in offering each student personally designated work and storage space. The Powell Wing was built in 1992 to house the professional and personal papers and archives of the United States Supreme Court Justice and noted W&L alum as well as other manuscript collections, rare books, and archives of the law school. The Powell Wing includes an expanded main reading room space, in addition to stack area and workspace for the papers. The archives are managed by full-time staff and are open to researchers, faculty, and students.

== Admissions and program ==
W&L Law's full-time Juris Doctor program, one of the smallest in the country, is the primary degree program at the Law School. For the Class of 2025 (numbering 128 students) 22.73% of applicants were accepted of which 24.06% enrolled, with enrolled students having a median LSAT of 167 and a median undergraduate grade point average of 3.75. An international exchange program is available for Juris Doctor students for study at Trinity College in Dublin or the University of Copenhagen in Copenhagen.

== Bar examination results ==
In 2023, the overall bar examination passage rate for the law school’s first-time examination takers was 83.33%. The Ultimate Bar Pass Rate, which the ABA defines as the passage rate for graduates who sat for bar examinations within two years of graduating, was 94.83% for the class of 2021.

== Post-graduation employment ==
Based on Class of 2015 data, 85% of W&L Law graduates obtained full-time, long-term JD-required, or preferred jobs within 10 months of graduation. 50% of the 2015 graduates obtained full-time long-term jobs in law firms (including 21% of graduates getting full-time, long-term jobs in firms greater than 100 lawyers) and 19% of 2015 graduates obtained clerkships. The large law firms which employed the most W&L Law graduates were Hunton Andrews Kurth, Alston & Bird, McGuireWoods, K&L Gates, and King & Spalding. The School of Law ranked 18th on the 2012 U.S. News' ranking of law schools by recruiters from the top national law firms and 19th on the 2015 U.S News ranking of law schools that send the most students to clerk for a United States federal judge (6.9%). The National Law Journal ranked W&L Law 33rd in its 2015 "Go-To Law Schools" list of law schools that send the highest percentage of students to the 250 largest law firms in the United States.

== Rankings and reputation ==
Washington and Lee University School of Law ranked tied for 33rd in the 2024 edition, and tied for 34th in the 2026 edition, of the U.S. News & World Report national ranking of America's law schools. Since the U.S. News rankings of law schools were first released in 1987, W&L Law has had an average ranking of 26th nationally through 1999. Brian Leiter ranked W&L Law's endowment-per-student as 14th in the country, at $214,000 per student, when adjusted for cost-of-living. Above the Law ranked W&L Law 22nd nationally in their 2019 Top 50 Law Schools rankings and, in 2017, 4th nationally in their rankings for the top-rated law schools when measuring alumni satisfaction. National Jurist ranked W&L Law 15th in its list of best law schools for standard of living and 18th in its ranking of the best law libraries. The 2013 edition of On Being a Black Lawyer: The Black Student's Guide to Law Schools, ranked W&L Law 25th in its rankings of the best law schools for black law students. In 2013, National Jurist named W&L's law faculty as the 10th most influential in legal education (the only entire faculty on the list) and 18th in 2014 as well as awarding W&L Law's practical training program a B+ grade in its 2014 listing of the best law schools for practical training. National Jurist also ranked W&L Law as the 5th best value private law school in 2016 in the United States. A ranking of scholarly impact published in the University of St. Thomas Law Journal ranked the faculty 30th nationally. A 2015 ranking by Business Insider, listed W&L Law as the 17th best law schools in the United States to make connections and get a job. Washington and Lee's The Law News has been awarded the ABA's award of the finest law school student newspaper four times, including three years in a row, in 1985, 2013, 2014, and 2015. In 2016, National Jurist included W&L Law on its list of one of the twelve best value private law schools in the United States.

== Juris Doctor curriculum ==
The Juris Doctor curriculum at W&L consists of three unique and integrated years of full-time study with a mix of traditional casebook method and practice-oriented courses.

First-year

In the 1L year, students take required foundational courses in contract law, tort law, civil procedure, criminal law, property law, professional responsibility, administrative law, and international law. Additionally, each student is assigned a small section in which one substantive required course also serves as a legal writing course. This small section consists of approximately 20 students. 1Ls are also assigned to an upper-level student from the Burks Scholar Program who teaches legal research and Bluebook methods.

Second-year

In the 2L year, students focus on advanced coursework. W&L requires evidence law and constitutional law in the second-year as well as the completion of an upper-level writing requirement. The writing requirement can be satisfied through a seminar course, through an independent writing project, or a note in one of the law journals. All other courses in the 2L year are electives and commonly include corporate law and tax law as well as many other classes and seminars. Since establishing the practice-based curriculum, W&L incorporated its experiential curricular offerings, such as practicum courses, into the second-year in addition to casebook-oriented electives.

Third-year

The new third-year program, which began in the fall of 2010, replaced further elective advanced coursework based on the casebook method as is the norm in most ABA law schools. Instead, the program is meant to simulate client experiences. The 3L year requires students to exercise professional judgment, work in teams, solve problems, counsel clients, negotiate solutions, and serve as advocates and counselors — the full complement of professional activity that engages practicing lawyers as they apply legal theory and doctrines to the real-world issues of serving clients ethically and honorably within the highest traditions of the profession.

The Fall semester begins with an immersion course. Students are allowed to choose one of two courses for the two-week immersion. Immersion focuses on either litigation and alternative dispute resolution or transactional practice. Each student is then enrolled in practicum courses of their choosing. These courses cover substantive and advanced law but do so through practical methods of drafting paperwork and problem-solving rather than casebooks and the socratic method. Students are also required to take a course in the legal profession as well as a law-related service requirement. Finally, each student is required to be involved in one of W&L's legal clinics, externship programs, or transnational programs to gain real-client experience. The program is flexible and allows students the ability to tailor their schedule and, if they wish, to take several traditional casebook method courses.

== The Honor System ==
The Honor System has been run by the student body since 1905 and is derived from Robert E. Lee during his tenure as President of the University. Any student found guilty of an Honor Violation by their peers is subject to a single penalty: expulsion. The Honor System is defined and administered solely by students, and there is no higher review. A formal review, occasionally including referendums, is held every three years to refine the tenets of the Honor System. Students continue to support the Honor System and its single penalty overwhelmingly, and alumni regularly point to the Honor System as one of the distinctive marks they carry with them from their W&L experience. W&L Law students enjoy several distinct benefits from the Honor System. These include more freedom in exam taking as well as an informal account system at the Brief Stop cafeteria in Sydney Lewis Hall. These are balanced by the strict penalty for a violation of the Honor System.

== Clinics, journals, moot courts, and centers ==
The Law School houses six clinics:

- Advanced Administrative Litigation Clinic (Black Lung)
- Civil Rights and Racial Justice Clinic
- Community Legal Practice Clinic
- Criminal Justice Clinic
- Immigrant Rights Clinic
- Tax Clinic

The Law School is home to the following centers:

- Frances Lewis Law Center
- Transnational Law Institute
- The Law School is also a major partner in the Mudd Center for Ethics

The Law School offers five moot court programs:

- Client Counseling Competition
- The John W. Davis Appellate Advocacy Competition
- Mock Trial Competition
- The Robert J. Grey Jr. Negotiations Competition
- Representation in Mediation Competition

The Law School is host to three academic journals:

- German Law Journal
- Journal of Civil Rights and Social Justice
- Washington and Lee Law Review

== Notable alumni ==
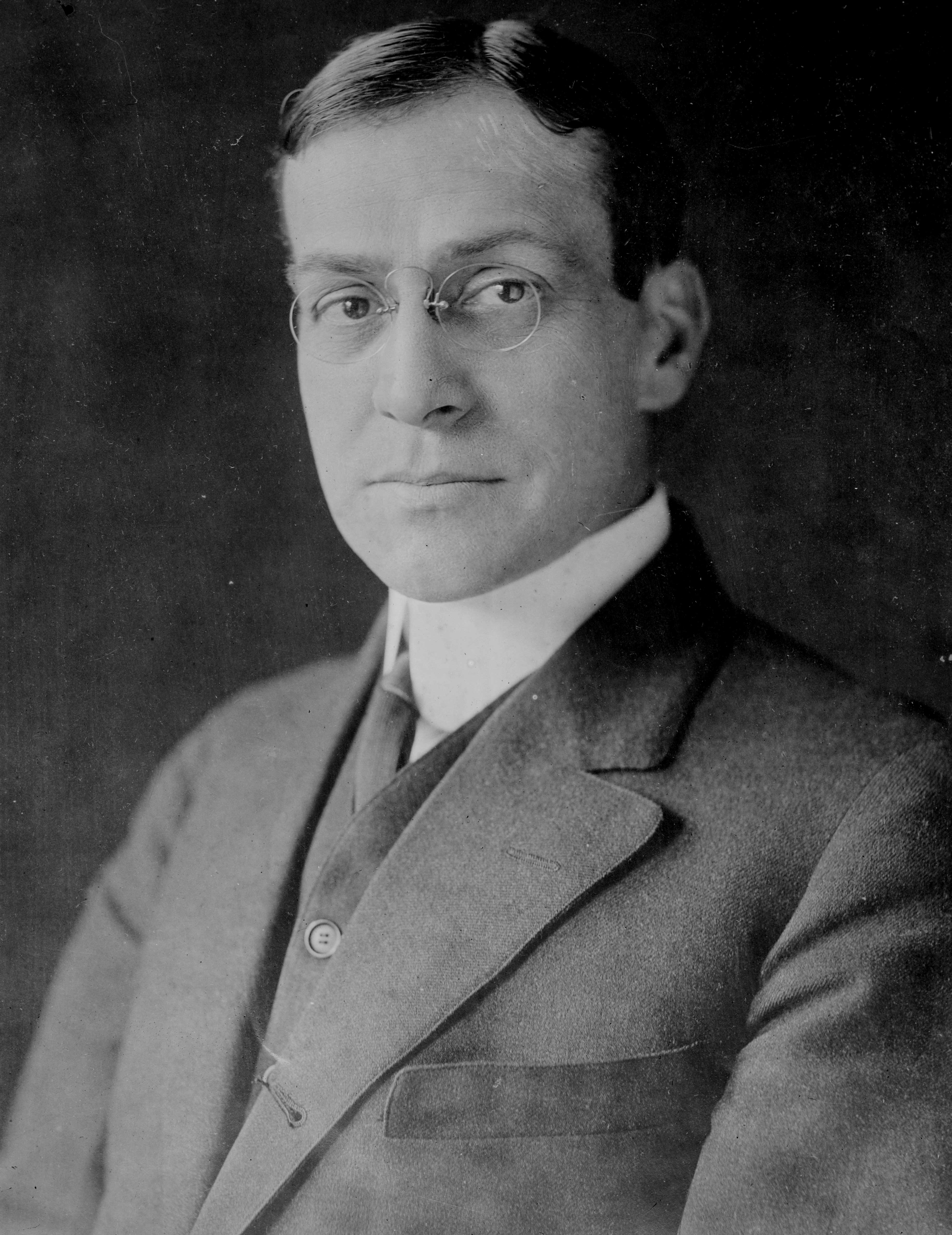
Newton D. Baker, Class of 1894, United States Secretary of War

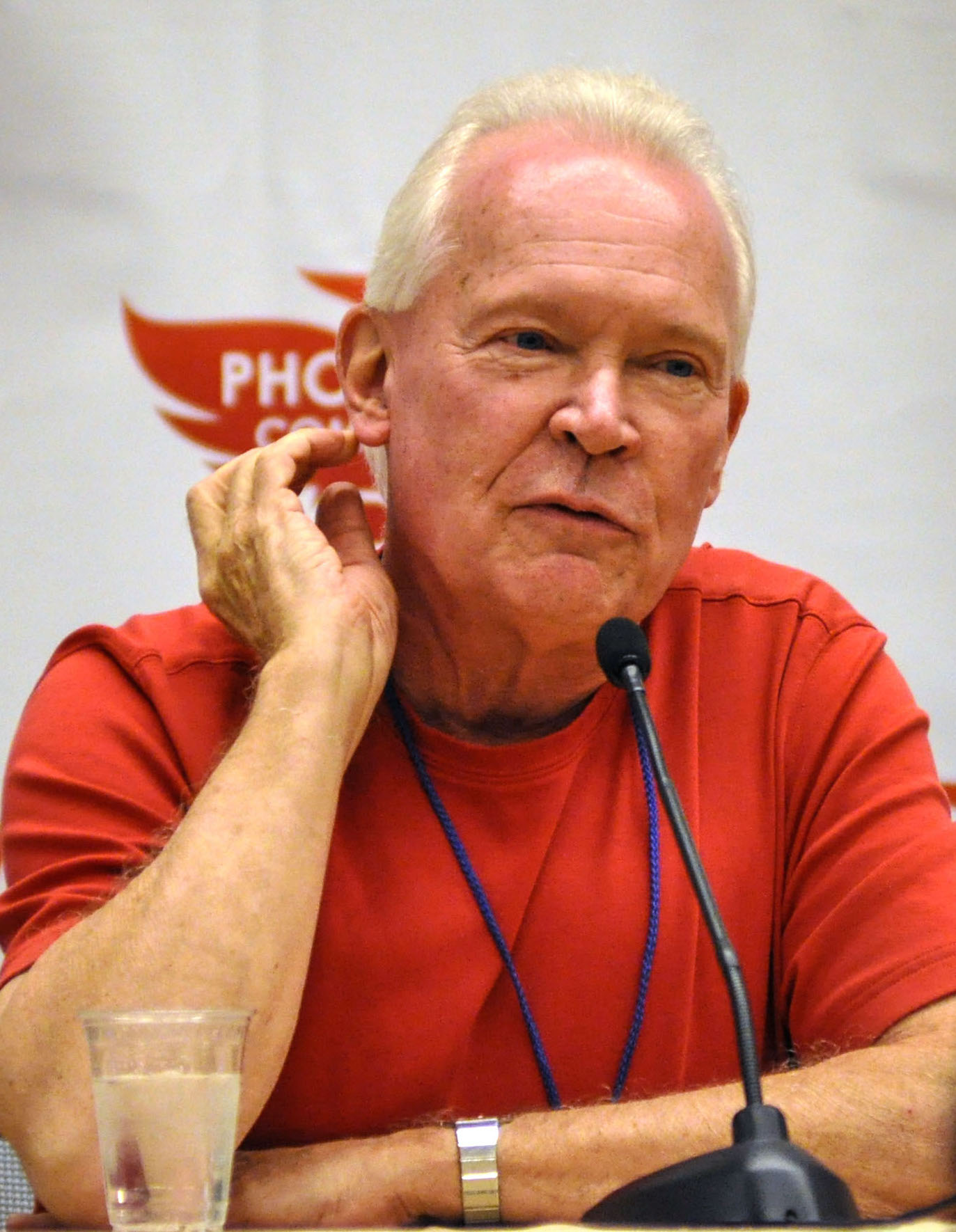
Terry Brooks, Class of 1969, New York Times Best Selling Author

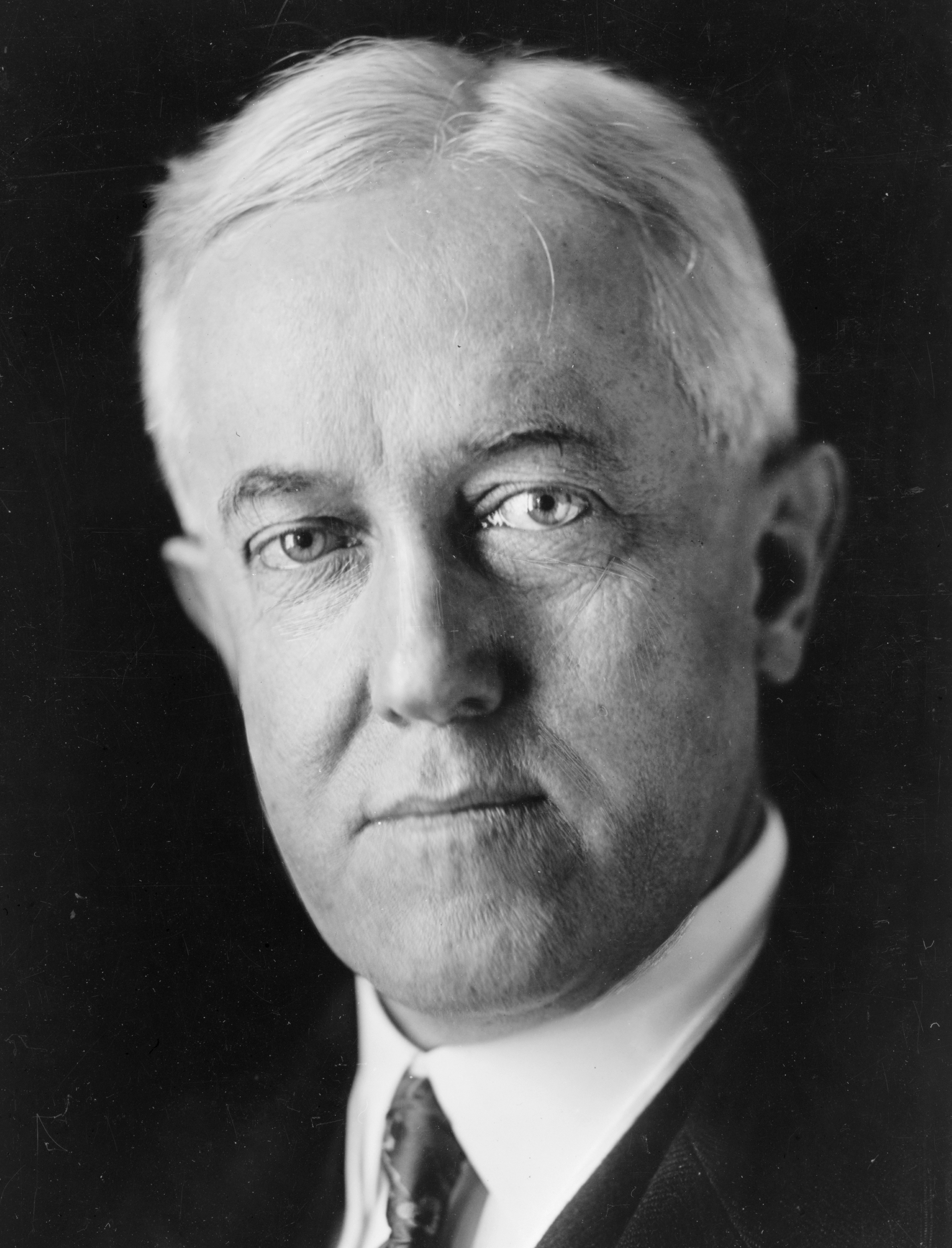
John W. Davis, Class of 1892, United States Solicitor General

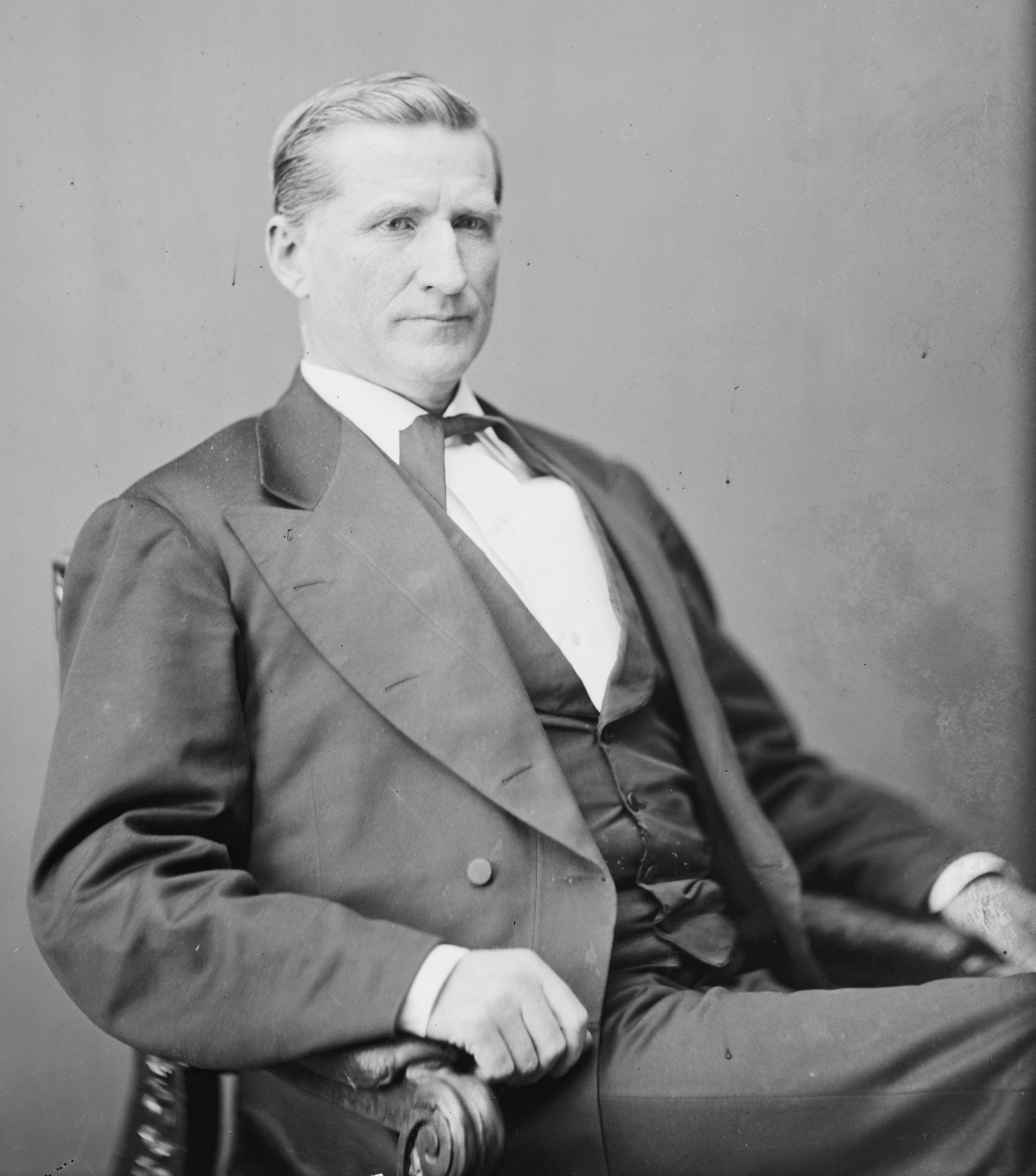
John Goode, Class of ~1851, United States Solicitor General

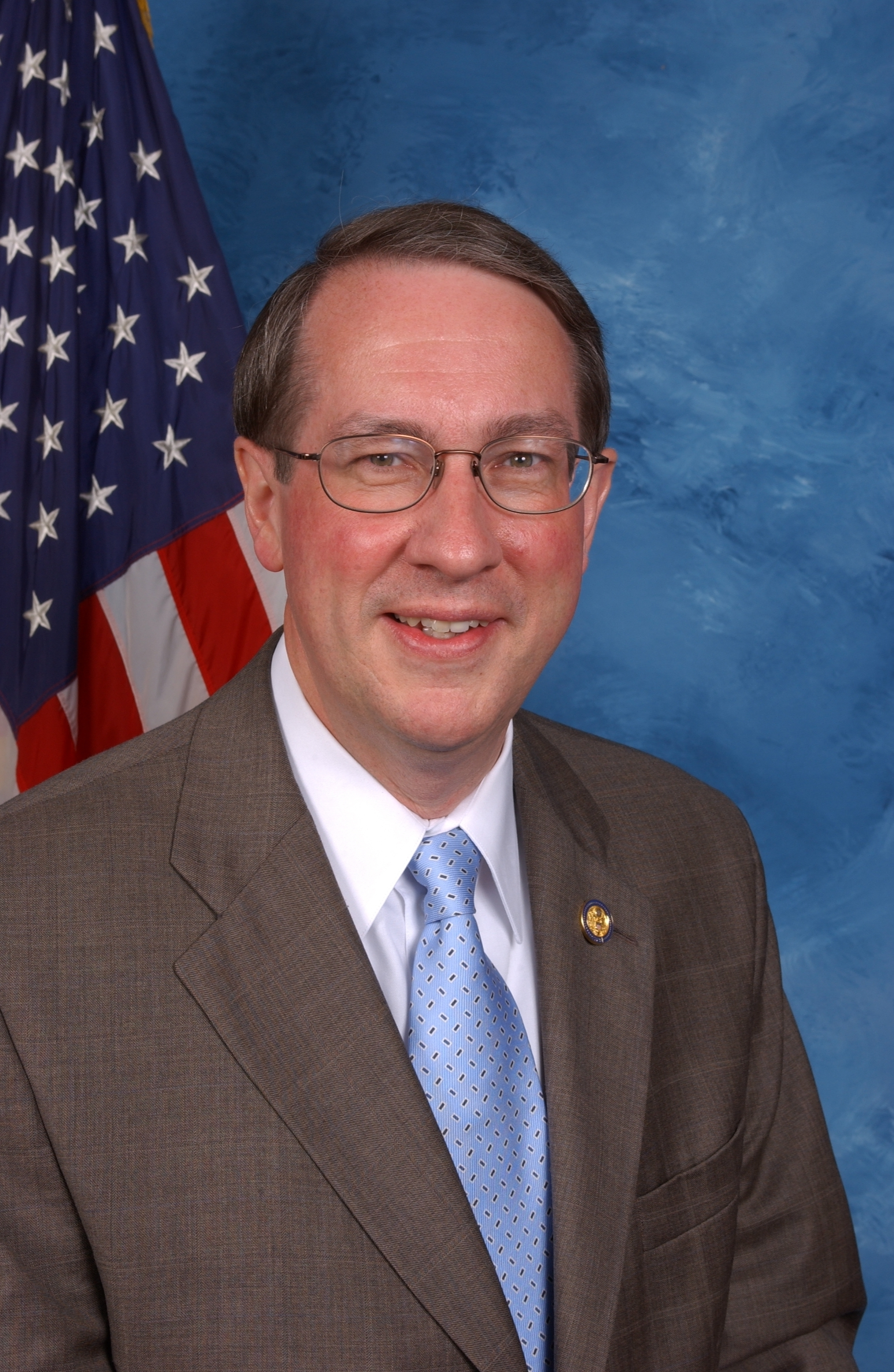
Bob Goodlatte, Class of 1977, former Chair of the United States House Committee on the Judiciary

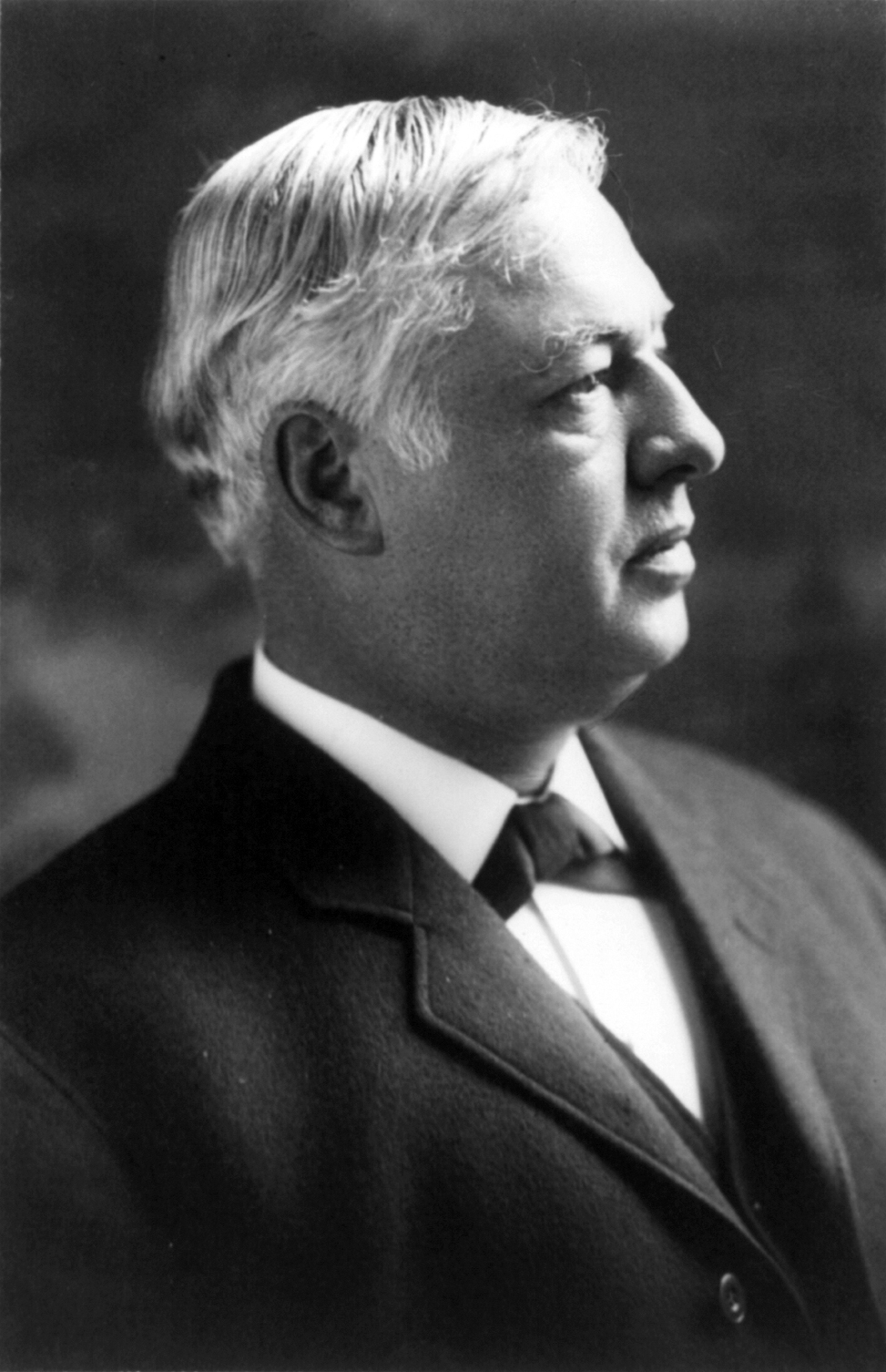
Joseph Rucker Lamar, Class of 1878, Associate Justice of the United States Supreme Court

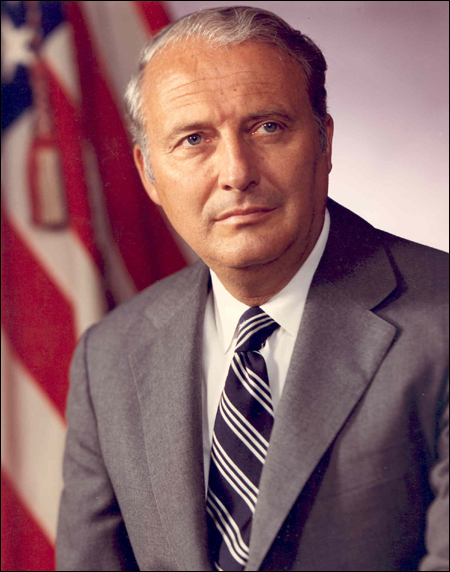
John Otho Marsh Jr., Class of 1951, United States Secretary of the Army

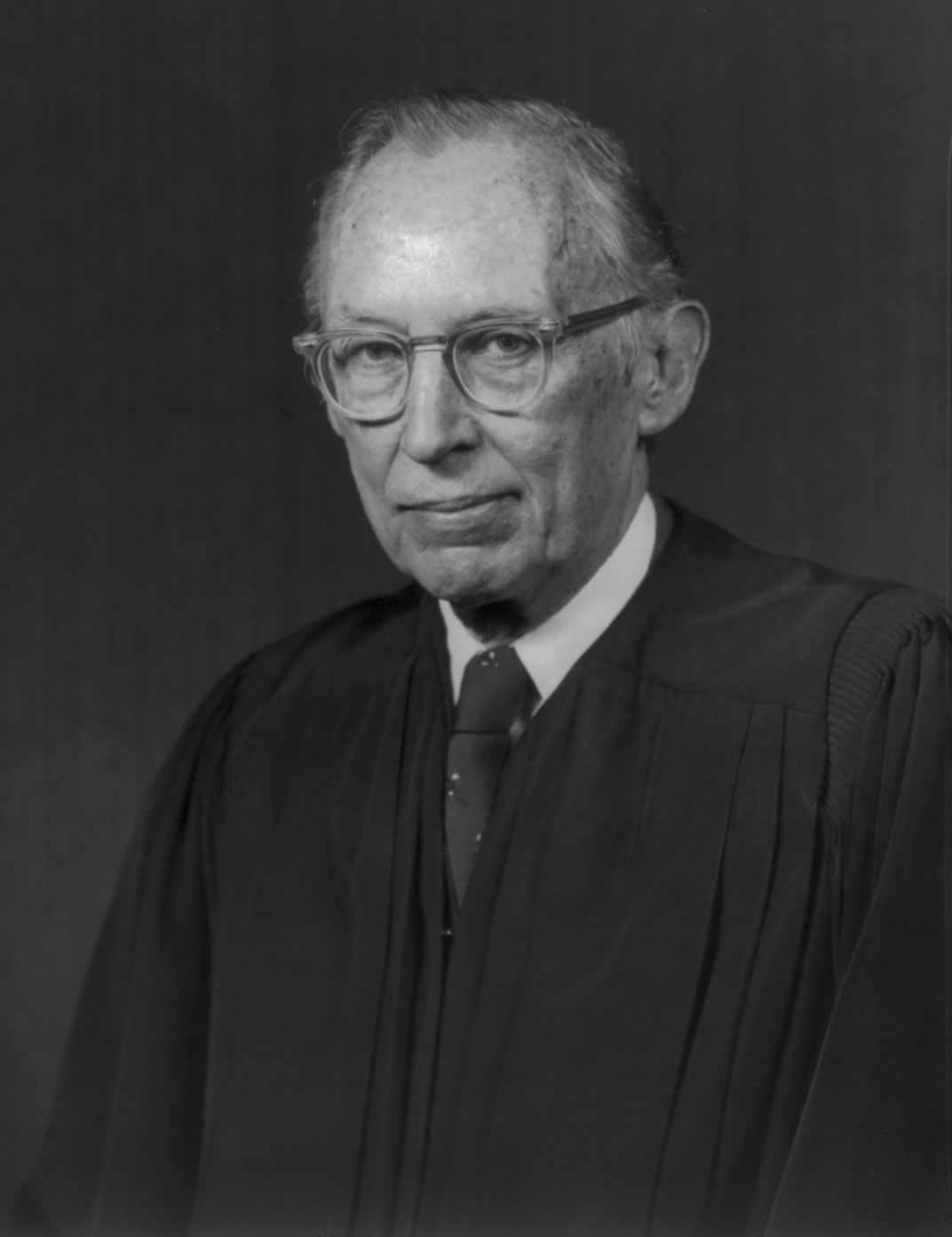
Lewis F. Powell Jr., Class of 1931, Associate Justice of the United States Supreme Court

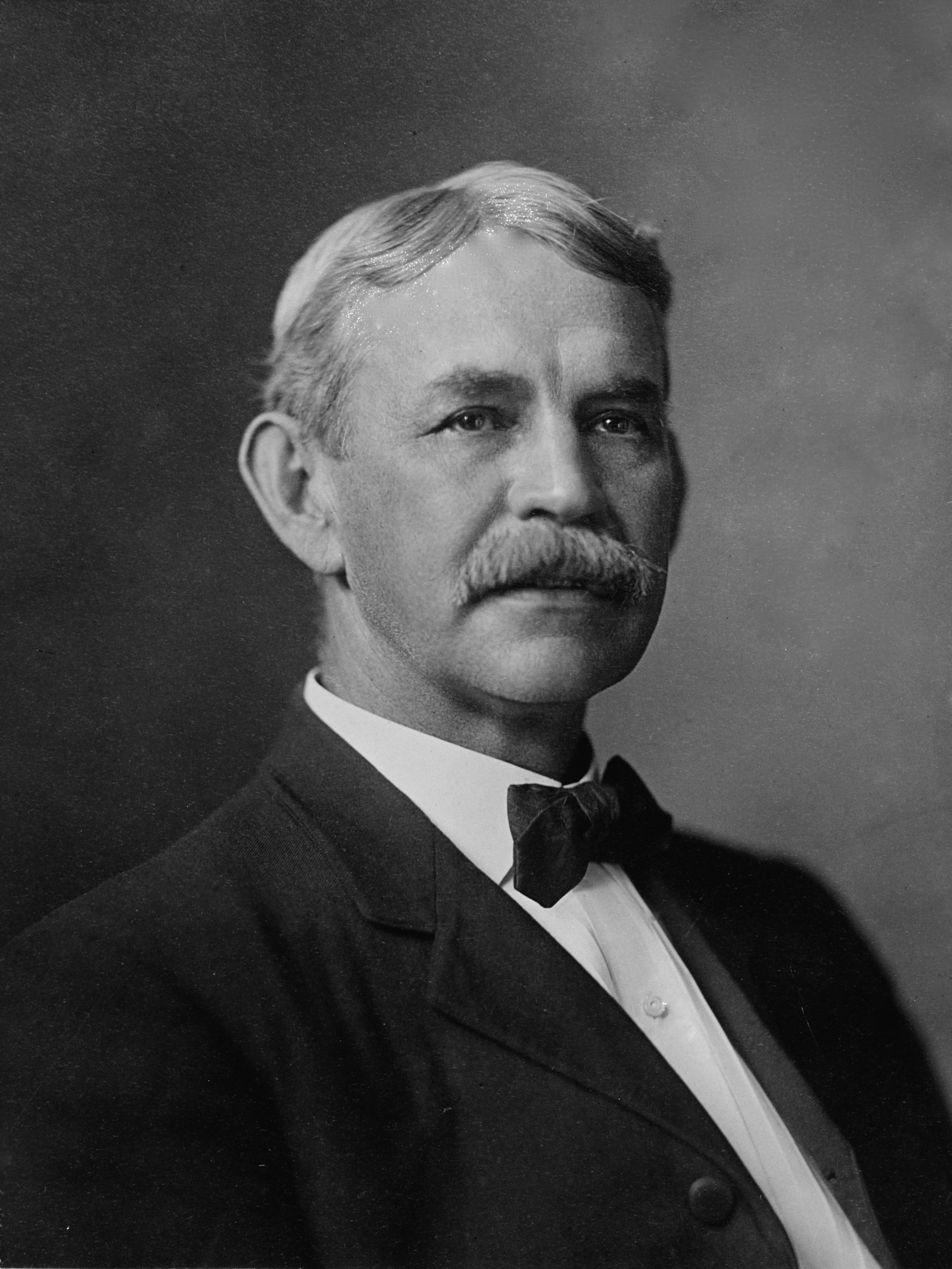
Henry St. George Tucker III, Class of 1879, United States Representative from Virginia

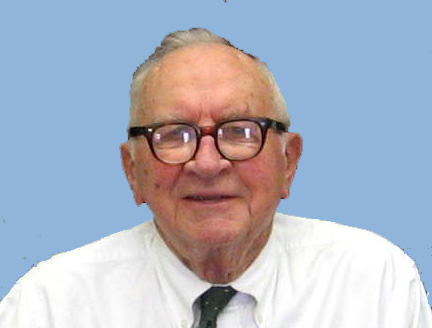
Hiram Emory Widener Jr., Class of 1953, Senior Judge on the United States Court of Appeals for the Fourth Circuit

== Notable former faculty ==
- Johanna Bond - dean of Rutgers Law School
- John White Brockenbrough - Federal Judge, founder, and former Dean of the Washington and Lee University School of Law
- Martin P. Burks - Former Dean and justice on the Virginia Supreme Court
- David Bruck - Noted capital defense attorney, Supreme Court advocate, and Director of the Virginia Capital Clearinghouse at W&L Law
- Judy Clarke - Noted criminal defense attorney for Ted Kaczynski, Zacarias Moussaoui, Susan Smith, Eric Rudolph, Jared Lee Loughner, and Dzhokhar Tsarnaev
- John W. Davis 1895, 1892 - 1924 Democratic nominee for U.S. President; United States Solicitor General; and American Bar Association President
- Creigh Deeds - Democratic nominee for Governor of Virginia in 2009 and Virginia State Senator
- Nora Demleitner - Former Dean of W&L Law and Hofstra University School of Law
- John DiPippa 1978 — former Dean of the University of Arkansas at Little Rock School of Law
- Charles A. Graves 1872 - Professor at W&L Law and at the University of Virginia School of Law
- Roger Groot - Professor of Criminal Law and noted death penalty expert
- Homer A. Holt 1918, 1923 - Governor of West Virginia from 1937 to 1941
- Robert Huntley 1950, 1957 - Former Dean of W&L Law, former President of Washington and Lee University, former President, Chairman, and CEO of Best Products
- Allan Ides - Professor and Constitutional Law and Civil Procedure expert
- Timothy Jost - Professor and expert in health law
- Donald W. Lemons - Chief Justice of the Supreme Court of Virginia
- Jeffrey P. Minear - Counselor to Chief Justice John G. Roberts Jr.
- Blake Morant - Dean of the George Washington Law School and former Dean of the Wake Forest University School of Law
- David F. Partlett - Former Dean of W&L Law and of Emory University School of Law
- Leander J. Shaw Jr. - Chief Justice of the Florida Supreme Court
- Rodney A. Smolla - Dean of Widener University-Delaware Law, Former Dean of W&L Law and University of Richmond School of Law, First Amendment scholar, and former president of Furman University
- Abram Penn Staples 1908 - Attorney General of Virginia and justice on the Virginia Supreme Court
- Waller Redd Staples - Member of the Confederate House of Representatives and justice on the Virginia Supreme Court
- Barry Sullivan - Former Dean and currently professor at Loyola University Chicago School of Law
- Henry St. George Tucker III 1876 - Former Dean of W&L Law, Dean of the George Washington University Law School, Congressman from Virginia, and former president of the American Bar Association
- John Randolph Tucker - Virginia Attorney General, former Dean, and former President of the American Bar Association
- William R. Vance 1869 - Professor at Yale Law School, and Dean of W&L Law, George Washington University Law School, and the University of Minnesota Law School
- H. Emory Widener Jr. 1953 - Judge for the United States Court of Appeals for the Fourth Circuit
