= Thomas Porteous =

American judge (1946–2021)

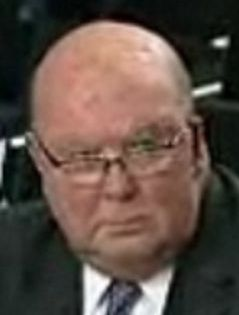

Judge of the United States District Court for the Eastern District of Louisiana
- In office October 11, 1994 – December 8, 2010; Suspended: September 10, 2008 – December 8, 2010
- Appointed by: Bill Clinton
- Preceded by: Robert Frederick Collins
- Succeeded by: Susie Morgan

Personal details
- Born: Gabriel Thomas Porteous Jr. December 15, 1946 New Orleans, Louisiana, U.S.
- Died: November 14, 2021 (aged 74) New Orleans, Louisiana, U.S.
- Spouse: Carmella Giardina (died 2005)
- Children: 4
- Education: Louisiana State University (BA, JD)

Gabriel Thomas Porteous Jr. (December 15, 1946 – November 14, 2021) was a United States district judge of the United States District Court for the Eastern District of Louisiana. He served for sixteen years before being impeached and removed from office in December 2010. He died on November 14, 2021, aged 74.

== Education and career ==
Porteous was born in New Orleans, Louisiana. He received a Bachelor of Arts degree from Louisiana State University in 1968 and a Juris Doctor from Louisiana State University Law School in 1971. He was a special counsel to the Office of the State Attorney General, Louisiana, from 1971 to 1973. He served as Chief of the Felony Complaint Division in the District Attorney's Office, Jefferson Parish, Louisiana, from 1973 to 1975.

He was in private practice in Gretna from 1973 to 1980, and in Metairie from 1980 to 1984. He was a city attorney of Harahan from 1982 to 1984. He was elected as a judge on the 24th Judicial District Court of Louisiana in 1984 and served until 1994.

== Federal judicial service ==
On August 25, 1994, Porteous was nominated by President Bill Clinton to a seat on the United States District Court for the Eastern District of Louisiana vacated by Robert Frederick Collins. He was confirmed by the United States Senate on October 7, 1994, and received his commission on October 11, 1994.

== Notable rulings ==
Porteous ruled in several landmark cases against the state, including one 2002 case in which he ruled that the state of Louisiana was illegally using federal money to promote religion in its abstinence-only sex education programs. He ordered the state to stop giving money to individuals or organizations that "convey religious messages or otherwise advance religion" with tax dollars. Judge Porteous also said there was ample evidence that many of the groups participating in the Governor's Program on Abstinence were "furthering religious objectives." Those who supported such groups objected to his ruling.

Also in 2002, Porteous overturned a federal ban on rave paraphernalia such as glowsticks, pacifiers, and dust masks, originally banned due to the subculture's ties to recreational drugs such as ecstasy, after the American Civil Liberties Union successfully claimed the ban to be unconstitutional. He had previously ruled in 1999 against a Louisiana law aimed at banning the second trimester abortion procedure known as intact dilation and extraction.

== Bankruptcy ==
In 2001, Porteous filed for bankruptcy, which led to revelations in the press about his private life, specifically the fact that he was alleged to have had close ties with local bail bond magnate Louis Marcotte III, at the center of a corruption probe. Porteous himself was the subject of investigation by federal investigators.

In May 2006, Porteous, beset by the recent loss of his home due to Hurricane Katrina in August 2005, and the death of his wife a few months later, and still under investigation by a federal grand jury, was granted temporary medical leave and began a year-long furlough from the federal bench.

== Impeachment proceedings ==
On June 18, 2008, the Judicial Conference of the United States transmitted a certificate to the Speaker of the United States House of Representatives expressing the Conference's determination that consideration of impeachment of Porteous might be warranted. The certificate stated that there was substantial evidence that Porteous "repeatedly committed perjury by signing false financial disclosure forms under oath," thus concealing "cash and things of value that he solicited and received from lawyers appearing in litigation before him." In a specific case,

he denied a motion to recuse based on his relationship with lawyers in the case . . . and failed to disclose that the lawyers in question had often provided him with cash. Thereafter, while a bench verdict (that is, a verdict by a judge sitting without a jury) was pending, he solicited and received from the lawyers appearing before him illegal gratuities in the form of cash and other things of value

thus depriving "the public of its right to his honest services." The certificate concluded that this conduct "constituted an abuse of his judicial office" in violation of the Canons of the Code of Conduct for United States Judges.

The certificate also stated that there was substantial evidence that Porteous had "repeatedly committed perjury by signing false financial disclosure forms under oath" in connection with his bankruptcy, allowing "him to obtain a discharge of his debts while continuing his lifestyle at the expense of his creditors." Further, he had "made false representations to gain the extension of a bank loan with the intent to defraud the bank." They suspended him without pay on September 10, 2008.

=== Investigation ===
On September 18, 2008, the House Judiciary Committee voted unanimously to proceed with an investigation of the bribery and perjury allegations. On October 15, 2008, House Judiciary Chair John Conyers announced that Alan I. Barron had been hired as Special Counsel to lead an inquiry into Porteous's impeachment. Representatives Adam Schiff (D-CA) and Bob Goodlatte (R-VA) were designated as Chair and Ranking Member, respectively, to lead the task force conducting the inquiry. Three months later, the House passed via voice vote a Conyers-sponsored resolution authorizing and directing the Committee on the Judiciary to run an impeachment inquiry into whether the House should impeach Porteous. The resolution was needed because the previous year's investigation had ended with the previous Congress. In October 2009, Reps. Conyers and Lamar S. Smith introduced a resolution asking to access the judge's tax returns as part of the investigation. The resolution was referred to the Rules Committee and, at the same time, a timeframe was established which called for the investigation to end in November 2009; the Judicial Impeachment Task Force would decide by the end of the year if impeachment would be recommended to the Judiciary Committee. If the recommendation was for impeachment, the Committee would take up the matter in early 2010. The task force scheduled the first hearings on the case for November 17 and 18, with more meetings in December before a final recommendation was made.

=== Impeachment ===
On November 13, Porteous sued the task force, claiming that the panel was violating his Fifth Amendment rights by using testimony given under immunity in making the case against him. On January 21, 2010, the panel voted unanimously to recommend four articles of impeachment to the full Judiciary Committee, which, on January 27, voted to send the articles of impeachment to the full House. On March 4, 2010, the full Committee reported H.Res. 1031, a resolution of impeachment of Porteous, to the full House. The full House considered the impeachment resolution on March 11, 2010, and voted to adopt all four articles, all of which passed unanimously, becoming the third of only three unanimous impeachment votes; the first was Harry E. Claiborne and the second was Walter Nixon. The subjects of the articles of impeachment, and the corresponding vote of the House of Representatives, appear below:

Article I – engaging in a pattern of conduct that is incompatible with the trust and confidence placed in him as a Federal judge – Passed the House by a vote of 412–0.
Article II – engaged in a longstanding pattern of corrupt conduct that demonstrates his unfitness to serve as a United States District Court Judge – Passed the House by a vote of 410–0.
Article III – knowingly and intentionally making false statements, under penalty of perjury, related to his personal bankruptcy filing and violating a bankruptcy court order – Passed the House by a vote of 416–0.
Article IV – knowingly made material false statements about his past to both the United States Senate and to the Federal Bureau of Investigation to obtain the office of United States District Court Judge – Passed the House by a vote of 423–0.

The same day, Representatives Adam Schiff (D-CA), Zoe Lofgren (D-CA), Hank Johnson (D-GA), Bob Goodlatte (R-VA), and Jim Sensenbrenner (R-WI) were appointed managers to conduct the trial in the Senate. In addition, Schiff and Goodlatte were designated as the lead managers. The articles of impeachment were sent to the Senate, where the proceedings were started on March 17. On that same day, Senators passed two resolutions: one provided for a summons for Porteous to answer the articles against him, and the other provided for a committee to analyze the evidence against him and report their findings to the full Senate. Senators Claire McCaskill (D-MO) and Orrin Hatch (R-UT) were designated as Chair and Vice Chair of the committee, respectively. The committee met on April 16. The trial was due to begin in early August, with a vote before the Senate happening in late September, but due to delays, it did not begin until mid-September, with a vote scheduled for December 8, 2010.

=== Trial ===
On December 7, 2010, the full Senate began hearing the impeachment trial. Senate President pro tempore Daniel Inouye presided over the trial. Jonathan Turley, acting in Judge Porteous's defense, announced that Judge Porteous had decided to leave the federal bench in 2011 were he not removed from office.

The following day, the Senate voted unanimously to convict Porteous on the first of four impeachment charges, removing him from the bench, before subsequently convicting him on the remaining three articles. In a separate vote, per a motion by Senate Majority Leader Harry Reid, the Senate disqualified Porteous from ever holding "any office of honor, trust or profit under the United States" again. He is one of only three former federal officers to be permanently banned from holding federal office after being impeached and removed, the others being West Hughes Humphreys and Robert W. Archbald.

Article I – engaging in a pattern of conduct that is incompatible with the trust and confidence placed in him as a Federal judge – Convicted in the Senate by a vote of 96–0.
Article II – engaged in a longstanding pattern of corrupt conduct that demonstrates his unfitness to serve as a United States District Court Judge – Convicted in the Senate by a vote of 69–27.
Article III – knowingly and intentionally making false statements, under penalty of perjury, related to his personal bankruptcy filing and violating a bankruptcy court order – Convicted in the Senate by a vote of 88–8.
Article IV – knowingly made material false statements about his past to both the United States Senate and to the Federal Bureau of Investigation to obtain the office of United States District Court Judge – Convicted in the Senate by a vote of 90–6.
Disqualification – Forever disqualified to hold any office of honor, trust or profit under the United States – Disqualified by the Senate by a vote of 94–2.

== Life after removal ==
On January 15, 2011, Porteous gave up his law license in lieu of facing discipline, and agreed to never practice law in Louisiana again. According to the Louisiana Attorney Disciplinary Board, Porteous's conviction by the Senate effectively ended his legal career. He died on November 14, 2021.

Legal offices
Preceded by Robert Frederick Collins	Judge of the United States District Court for the Eastern District of Louisiana; 1994–2010; Suspended: 2008–2010	Succeeded by Susie Morgan
