= Roger Groot =

American law professor

Roger Douglas Groot (1942–2005) was an American law professor.

== Early life ==
Groof was born in 1942. Groot earned a B.A. degree from Vanderbilt University in 1963, Phi Beta Kappa. He then served six years in the United States Marine Corps, including a tour in Vietnam as an advisor to the Army of the Republic of Vietnam. He earned a J.D. degree from the University of North Carolina at Chapel Hill in 1971, Order of the Coif.

== Career ==
Groof was Professor of Law at Washington and Lee University School of Law in Lexington, Virginia, where he taught starting 1973. He was an expert in criminal law and procedure, and the death penalty. Groot had been appointed counsel in several Virginia capital cases, appointed as defense legal analyst in federal death penalty cases, and consulted in several hundred capital cases, including Lee Boyd Malvo (Beltway Sniper) and Peter Odighizuwa (Appalachian School of Law shooting). The New York Times reporter Jayson Blair wrote an article about Groot's defense of Malvo. However, Times later noted that this article was among those where Blair misrepresented himself. Despite the byline stating that Blair was reporting from Lexington, Virginia, he did not go to Lexington and only interviewed Groot on the phone.

Groot authored many law review articles on criminal law/procedure topics, especially the early history of trial by jury. Groot regularly lectured at death penalty CLE programs, and was a member of the faculty, Virginia Death Penalty College. He was a frequent speaker to bar groups and specialty bars such as the Virginia Trial Lawyers Association and the Virginia College of Criminal Defense Attorneys.

Groot was a member of the Board of Governors of the Virginia Bar Association and a fellow of the Virginia Law Foundation. Virginia Senate Joint Resolution No. 18 honors the life of Groot.

== Personal life ==
Groot died while hunting at the age of 63 on November 12, 2005, of a cardiac arrhythmia caused by idiopathic dilated cardiomyopathy.
