= William H. J. Hubbard =

American legal scholar

- Education: University of Southern California (BA, MA); University of Chicago Law School (JD); University of Chicago (PhD)
- Employer: University of Chicago Law School
- Known for: Civil procedure and law and economics

William H. J. Hubbard is an American legal scholar who is currently a professor of law at the University of Chicago Law School. He is an expert on civil procedure and law and economics.

== Education and career ==
Hubbard graduated from the University of Southern California with a B.A. and an M.A. summa cum laude in 1997, majoring in economics. He ranked first in his class of 2,500. He was a recipient of the National Merit Scholarship. In 2000, he graduated with a J.D. with high honors from the University of Chicago Law School, where he served as executive editor of the University of Chicago Law Review and was a member of the Order of the Coif.

After graduating from law school, Hubbard worked as a law clerk for Judge Patrick E. Higginbotham on the U.S. Court of Appeals for the Fifth Circuit. Between 2001 and 2006, he worked as an associate at Mayer Brown, specializing in commercial litigation, appellate practice, and electronic discovery. In 2011, he completed a Ph.D. in economics at the University of Chicago.

In 2011, Hubbard joined the University of Chicago Law School faculty as an assistant professor. He became a tenured professor in 2016 and currently also serves as the Ronald H. Coase teaching scholar. He was a visiting assistant professor of law at Harvard Law School in 2015. He has published numerous articles in the areas of civil procedure, law and economics, and comparative law. He is an editor of the Journal of Legal Studies.
