= Susie Morgan =

American judge (born 1953)

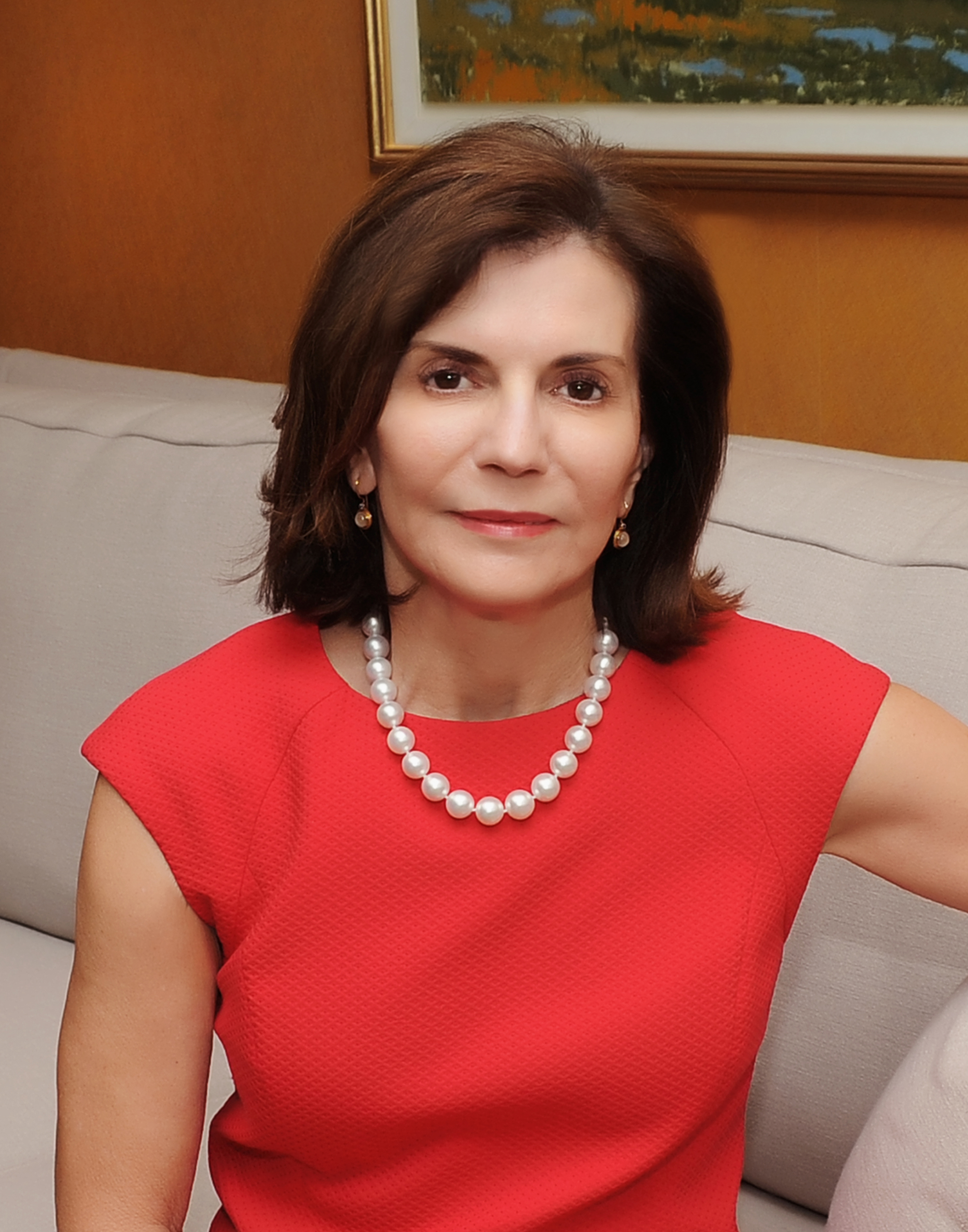

Judge of the United States District Court for the Eastern District of Louisiana
- Incumbent
- Assumed office March 30, 2012
- Appointed by: Barack Obama
- Preceded by: Thomas Porteous

Personal details
- Born: April 22, 1953 (age 73) Winnsboro, Louisiana, U.S.
- Education: University of Louisiana at Monroe (BA, MA); Louisiana State University (JD)

Donna Sue "Susie" Morgan, known professionally as Susie Morgan, formerly known as Donna Sue Beach and Donna Sue Leteff, (born April 22, 1953) is a United States district judge of the United States District Court for the Eastern District of Louisiana.

== Early life and education ==
Born in Winnsboro, Louisiana, Morgan earned a Bachelor of Arts in 1974 from Northeast Louisiana University in Monroe, Louisiana, and her Master of Arts in 1976. She obtained a Juris Doctor; Order of the Coif in 1980 from the Louisiana State University Paul M. Hebert Law Center.

== Career ==
Morgan first served from 1980 to 1981 as a law clerk to Judge Henry Anthony Politz of the United States Court of Appeals for the Fifth Circuit. Morgan joined the Shreveport firm of Wiener, Weiss and Madison in 1981, where she started as an associate and became a partner in 1985. She worked with them for more than 24 years.

She practiced in the New Orleans office of the Phelps Dunbar law firm from 2005 to 2012, becoming partner in 2009.

=== Federal judicial service ===
On June 7, 2011, President Barack Obama nominated Morgan to a seat on the United States District Court for the Eastern District of Louisiana that had been vacated by Judge Thomas Porteous' impeachment. On November 10, 2011, the Senate Judiciary Committee reported her nomination to the floor of the Senate by a voice vote. On March 28, 2012, her nomination was confirmed by a 96–1 vote. She received her commission on March 30, 2012.

=== Notable decisions ===
Morgan has overseen the New Orleans Police Department Consent Decree since its entry in January 2013. On January 31, 2019, Morgan ruled against New Orleans Saints ticket holders seeking to compel the NFL and the NFL Commissioner to enforce a rule that would alter the result of or force a replay of the 2018-2019 NFC Championship game.

In June 2024, Morgan ruled that the rap artist B.G., who was on supervised release from federal prison at the time, would be required to provide the US government with copies of any song lyrics that he writes prior to the song's production or promotion, and that federal prosecutors could seek to toughen the terms of his supervised release if the lyrics are judged to be "inconsistent with the goals of rehabilitation."

Legal offices
Preceded by Thomas Porteous	Judge of the United States District Court for the Eastern District of Louisiana; 2012–present	Incumbent
