= Robert L. Bridges =

American lawyer (1909–2006)

Robert Lysle Bridges (May 12, 1909 – July 18, 2006) was an American lawyer who specialized in construction and corporate law.

== Biography ==
Bridges was born on May 12, 1909, in Altus, Arkansas. He was educated at the University of California at Berkeley's Boalt Hall School of Law, where he was Order of the Coif. In 1933, he became a partner at the law firm Thelen & Marrin, which was renamed Thelen, Marrin, Johnson & Bridges in 1943. There he advised several members of the "Six Companies" group of construction companies on tax-related issues during the 1930s. He later served as a director of the Bechtel companies for almost thirty years. He was also a prominent supporter of his alma mater, the University of California, for many years, serving as a member of both the Chancellor's Circle and the U.C. Berkeley Foundation. He served as president of the 1930 class of the University of California at Berkeley, which endowed a chair to celebrate their fiftieth anniversary in 1980. The U.C. Berkeley Foundation awarded him the Trustees’ Citation Award in 1981 and the Chancellor's Award in 1982. He died on July 18, 2006, in Walnut Creek, California.
