= C. Tracey Stagg =

American politician

Charles Tracey Stagg (December 16, 1878 – July 14, 1939) was an American lawyer, law professor and politician from New York.

== Life ==
He was born on December 16, 1878, in Elmira, Chemung County, New York. He graduated from Cornell Law School in 1902. He was admitted to the bar, and was confidential clerk of Walter Lloyd Smith, Presiding Justice of the Appellate Division (3rd Dept.), until 1904. Then he practiced law in Elmira, and later in Ithaca. In November 1908, he became instructor in procedure, and in April 1909 assistant professor of law, at Cornell Law School.

He was appointed as Counsel to the Governor by Nathan L. Miller. In April 1922, he was appointed as Deputy New York State Commissioner of Conservation.

Stagg was a member of the New York State Senate (41st D.) from 1935 until his death in 1939, sitting in the 158th, 159th, 160th, 161st and 162nd New York State Legislatures.

Stagg vanished on the evening of July 13, 1939 and his disappearance to reported to the police. After an all night search for the missing senator, Sargeant John Kelly of the New York State Police found the deceased body of Stagg in the woods of the town of Newfield on the morning of July 14. The Tompkins County Coroner, William Seil, stated that Stagg had died of a self-inflicted gunshot. Seil stated that they had found a letter he wrote to his son, Norman Goff Stagg, noting that the pressures of being a legislator and his failing health dating back to 1936 had taken a toll on him. Stagg stated that the damage to his body was too much and that he would be unable to continue to live a normal life as he had up to that point. Similar notes were left to Joe R. Hanley, the Senate Majority Leader, and to the public. Stagg's former law partner, Louis Thaler, made the public announcement of Stagg's suicide.

Tributes to Stagg included a group of 30 lawyers from Tompkins County who gathered at the County Surrogate's Court to honor their fallen colleague. Joe Hanley stated that Stagg's letter thanked the body for their courtesy during his time as a senator. Hanley thought that his loss was a shock and that he had depended on Stagg for advice on matters in handling the Senate parliamentary issues. Governor Herbert H. Lehman called Stagg a "conscientous and very devoted public servant". In his letter, Stagg requested a private funeral held at his home in Ithaca. Stagg also requested that no member of the New York State Legislature attend his funeral, which would be officiated by a reverend from the Presbyterian church in Big Flats. He would be buried at Pleasant Grove Cemetery in Ithaca. Stagg also requested that his office desk in Albany be left without any respects and that no memorial services be held there in his honor.

== Sources ==
New York State Senate
Preceded by Frank A. Frost	New York State Senate; 41st District; 1935–1939	Succeeded by Chauncey B. Hammond
