= Celestine McConville =

American attorney

- Born: Celestine J. Richards
- Education: Boston University (B.A.); Georgetown University Law School (J.D.)
- Occupation: Law professor
- Known for: Expert on constitutional and death penalty law
- Spouse: Thomas S. McConville
- Children: 2

Celestine Richards McConville is an American attorney who is a law professor at the Dale E. Fowler School of Law of Chapman University in Orange, California. Her research interests include constitutional and death penalty law.

== Biography ==
McConville grew up in Rocky River, Ohio. She studied at Boston University, where she received a B.A. magna cum laude in 1988. She attended the Georgetown University School of Law, serving as an editor of the Georgetown Law Journal, graduating Order of the Coif and magna cum laude with a J.D. in 1991. After law school, she was law clerk for Judge Cynthia Holcomb Hall of the United States Court of Appeals for the Ninth Circuit, Judge Donald C. Nugent on the United States District Court for the Northern District of Ohio, and finally for Chief Justice of the United States Supreme Court William H. Rehnquist in 1992–1993. Following her clerkships, she practiced law for three years as an associate at Shea & Gardner in Washington, D.C., where she worked on litigation.

In 1999, McConville was a visiting professor at Case Western Reserve University School of Law. In 2000, McConville joined the faculty of Chapman University as an associate professor of law, where she teaches constitutional law. In 2005, she was promoted to professor of law. From June 2007 to May 2009, she served as associate dean for administrative affairs.

== Personal life ==
She is married to Thomas S. McConville, her law school classmate, who is a Superior Court judge in Orange County, California. They have two sons.

== Select articles ==
- McConville, Celestine Richards (2012). "Yikes! Was I Wrong? A Second Look at the Viability of Monitoring Capital Post-Conviction Counsel". Maine Law Review. 64: 486. SSRN 2466613.
- McConville, Celestine Richards (2006). "The Meaningless of Delayed Appointments and Discretionary Grants of Capital Post Conviction Counsel". Tulsa Law Review. 42 (2): 31.
- McConville, Celestine Richards (2005). "Protecting the Right to Effective Assistance of Capital Postconviction Counsel: The Scope of the Constitutional Obligation to Monitor Counsel Performance". University of Pittsburgh Law Review. 66 (3): 521. doi:10.5195/lawreview.2005.34.
- McConville, Celestine Richards (2003). "The Right to an Effective Assistance of Capital Post Conviction Counsel: Constitutional Implications of Statutory Grants on Capital Counts". Wisconsin Law Review. 42 (3): 253.
- Richards, Celestine J. (1990–1991). "Note, The Efficacy of Successorship Clauses in Collective Bargaining Agreements". Georgetown University Law Journal. 79: 1549. (Hein paid access)

== See also ==
- List of law clerks for the chief justice of the United States
