= Non incautus futuri =

Non incautus futuri is a motto meaning "Not Unmindful of the Future".

The motto is used on the crest of Washington and Lee University, located in Lexington, Virginia. It is also the motto of the Lee family, along with the name of the Futuri Society at Stratford Hall Plantation in Stratford, Virginia. The phase Ne incautus futuri meaning "Be Not Unmindful of the Future" was adopted as the motto of Hagerstown Business College, located in Hagerstown, Maryland in 1938.

The motto was officially adopted by Leesburg, Virginia in 1998.

The quote on the Lee family crest was "Ne incautus futuri", which holds the same translation.
