= Andrew M. Rosenfield =

American professor and business executive

- Education: Kenyon College, BS; Harvard University, MCRP; University of Chicago, JD
- Title: Managing Partner and President of Guggenheim Partners
- Spouse: Betsy Bergman Rosenfield (m. 1978)

Andrew M. Rosenfield is an entrepreneur, philanthropist, and the president of Guggenheim Partners, which he joined in 2004 as Managing Partner. He is a Senior Lecturer at the University of Chicago Law School, where he has taught since 1986.

== Early career and education ==
Rosenfield was educated at Kenyon College, Harvard University and The University of Chicago. He received his J.D. degree from The University of Chicago Law School in 1978, where he was elected to the Order of the Coif and graduated with honors. Rosenfield began his business career while still a student at the University of Chicago when in 1977, he co-founded Lexecon Inc. with Richard Posner and William Landes. He led that firm as its chief executive officer for more than 20 years until its sale in 2000.

In 1998, Rosenfield founded UNext Inc., an early online education business, and served as its chief executive officer until it was acquired by early investor Knowledge Universe. UNext partnered with Columbia University, The London School of Economics, Carnegie-Mellon University, Stanford University and The University of Chicago.

From 2006 through 2018 Rosenfield also was chief executive officer of TGG Group, which he co-founded with Gary Becker, Daniel Kahneman and Steve Levitt.

== Titles and affiliations ==
Rosenfield is a member of the board of trustees of The University of Chicago, former vice-chairman of the board of trustees of the Art Institute of Chicago, and a past member of the board of The Lyric Opera of Chicago.

== Philanthropic donations ==
In 2011, Rosenfield and his wife, Betsy, donated $25 million to the Becker Friedman Institute for Research in Economics at the University of Chicago; a gift honoring his mentors.
