= Chapman University School of Law =

Private law school in Orange, California, US

- Parent school: Chapman University
- Established: 1995; 31 years ago
- School type: Private law school
- Parent endowment: $564.6 million (2020)
- Dean: Antony Page
- Location: Orange, California, US; 33°47′38″N 117°51′04″W
- Enrollment: 417
- Faculty: 41 (full-time) 58 (part-time)
- USNWR ranking: 108th (tie) (2024)
- Bar pass rate: 80% (2023 first-time takers)
- Website: chapman.edu/law/
- ABA profile: Standard 509 Report

The Chapman University School of Law (officially the Chapman University Dale E. Fowler School of Law) is a private, non-profit law school located in Orange, California. The school offers the Juris Doctor degree (JD) and combined degree programs including a JD/MBA, and a JD/MFA in Film & Television Producing. The school also offers emphasis options in Business Law, Criminal Law, Entertainment Law, Environmental Law, Entrepreneurial Law, International Law, Trial Advocacy, and Taxation. Currently, the school has 41 full-time and 58 part-time faculty and a law library with holdings in excess of 290,000 volumes and volume equivalents.

== Accreditation history ==
Established in 1995 as part of Chapman University, Chapman Law gained provisional accreditation from the American Bar Association (ABA) in 1998 and received full ABA accreditation in 2002. In addition to its ABA membership, the Association of American Law Schools admitted Chapman Law as one of its members in 2006. In 2019, the ABA again fully accredited the school until 2027, the standard seven-year accreditation term.

== Admissions ==
For the class entering in 2025, the school accepted 20.53% of applicants, with 29.46% of those accepted enrolling. The average enrollee had a 163 LSAT score and 3.70 undergraduate GPA.Chapman ABA Data 2025

== Bar passage rate ==
For 2024, the overall first-time bar passage rate for Chapman University's Dale E. Fowler School of Law was 74.13%, while the overall first-time pass rate for ABA-accredited law schools for the California bar was 77.65%. The Ultimate Bar Pass Rate, which the ABA defines as the passage rate for graduates who sat for bar examinations within two years of graduating, was 95.30% for the class of 2022.

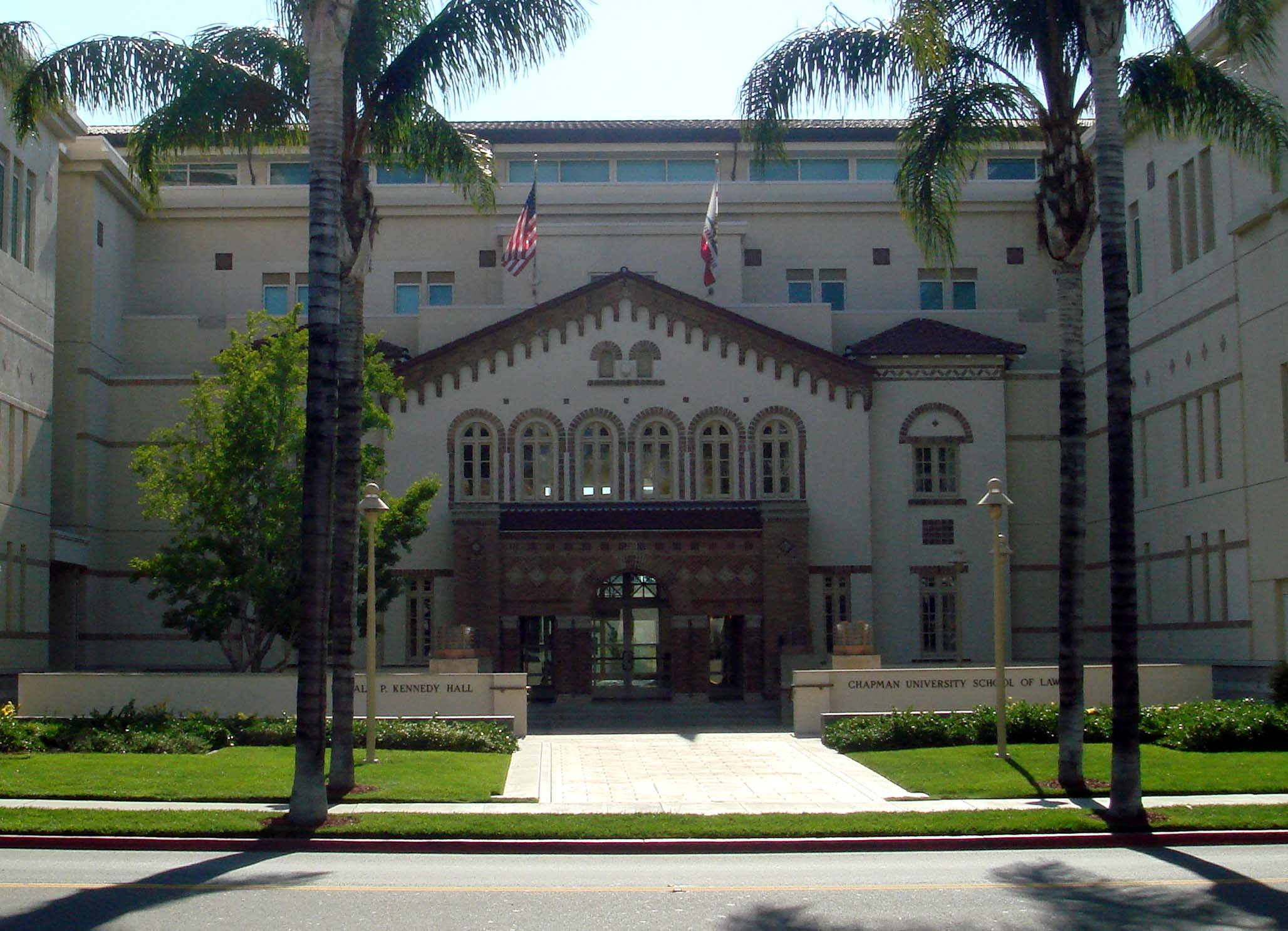
Entrance to School of Law

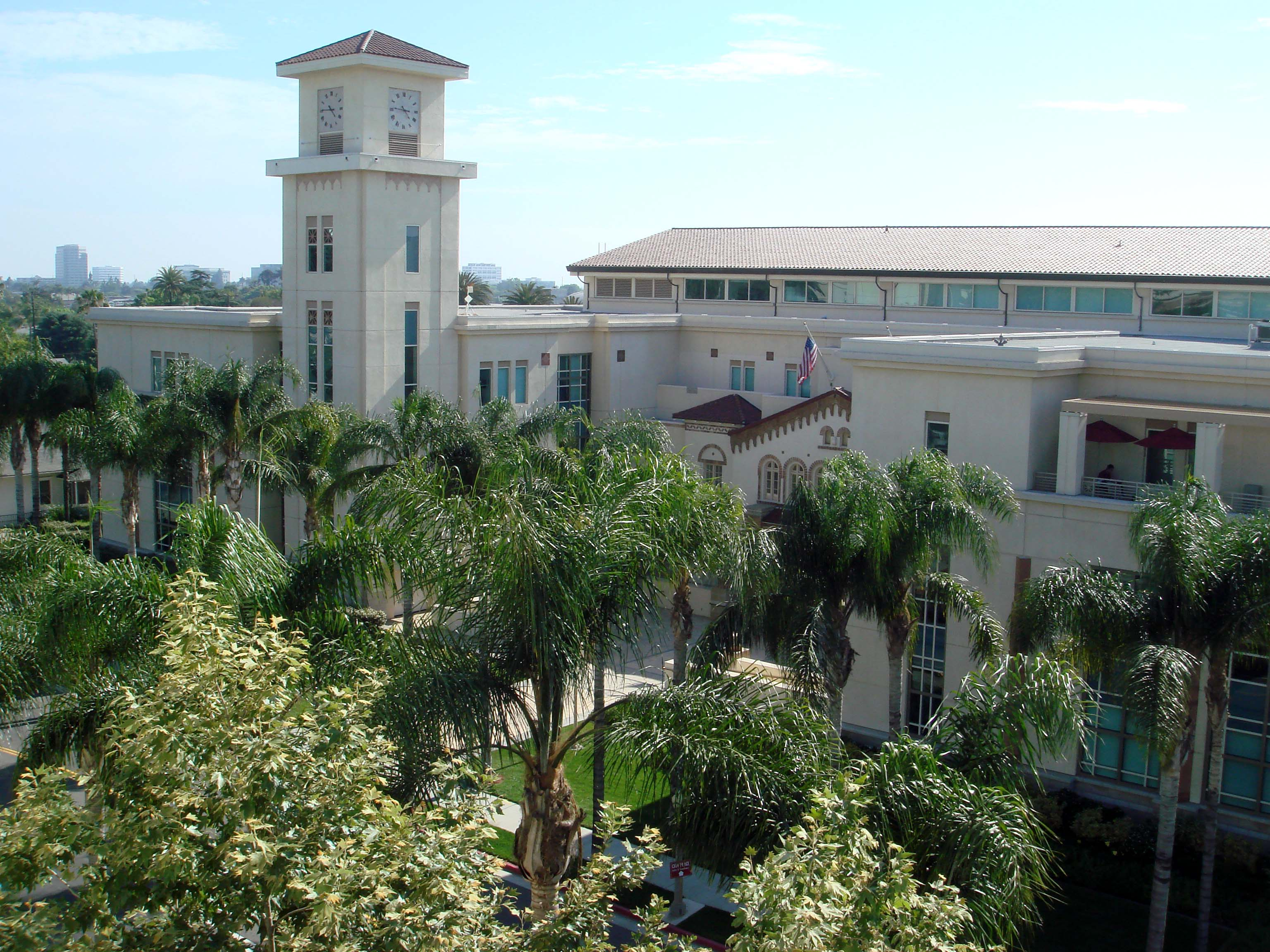
Donald P. Kennedy Hall, home of the School of Law

== Post-graduation employment ==
According to Chapman's official ABA-required disclosures, 83.4% of the Class of 2024 obtained bar passage required employment (i.e., as attorneys) 10 months or less after graduation, 12.41% were employed in JD advantage jobs where bar passage was a desired qualification, but not required. Positions were in various size law firms, most being in 1-10 attorney firms (31.2%) with employment in firms of up to 501+ attorneys; two graduates obtained federal clerkship positions and one graduate obtained a state judicial clerkship. Of the Class of 2024, 4% of graduates were employed in public interest, 6% in government, 1% in higher education, and 8% in business/industry employment.

== Rankings ==
Chapman University School of Law is currently ranked tied for 104th by the U.S. News & World Report's annual law school rankings.

== Costs and average student indebtedness ==
The cost of tuition for full-time JD students at Chapman for the 2025–2026 academic year was $65,020, which does not include living expenses and fees.

== Scholarships ==
Chapman, like some other law schools, uses merit-based scholarships in order to entice competitive students who might otherwise pass over the school for higher ranked competitors and to enhance its own ranking.

== Dean ==
Antony Page is the dean of Fowler School of Law, having assumed the responsibility in August 2026 from Kenneth Stahl who served as interim dean from October 2025. Paul Paton served as dean from March 2023 through October 1, 2025. He assumed the role from Interim Dean Marisa Cianciarulo who served as interim-dean from December 1, 2021 through June 30, 2023. Prior deans include Matthew J. Parlow who served as dean from July 1, 2016 to December 1, 2021 who, in turn, succeeded Tom Campbell, dean of Fowler School of Law from 2011-2016, Scott W. Howe served as dean from 2010-2011, John C. Eastman from 2007-2010, and Parham Williams served as dean from 1997-2007.

== Notable faculty ==
- Tom Campbell, Member of the United States Congress, 1989–1993 and 1995–2001, member of the California State Senate 1993–1995, and director of the California Department of Finance from 2004–2005.
- John C. Eastman, who represented Donald Trump in disputes over the 2020 US presidential election. On January 13, 2021, Eastman retired from the Chapman University faculty after he creating controversy by speaking at a Trump rally that preceded the storming of the United States Capitol.
- Hugh Hewitt, radio host and co-panelist in several of the 2016 presidential debates.
- Celestine McConville, Constitutional law and death penalty scholar
- Vernon L. Smith, co-winner of the Nobel Prize in economics

== Law journals ==
Chapman's Fowler School of Law publishes the Chapman Law Review, a student-run scholarly journal. In addition to publishing the scholarly journal, the Chapman Law Review hosts the Chapman Law Review Symposium at the start of the spring semester each year.

== Notable alumni ==
- John C. Yoder – Judge of 23rd Circuit Court of West Virginia and West Virginia Senate
- Bilal A. "Bill" Essayli – acting United States attorney for the Central District of California
