= William Willard Gibson Jr. =

American legal scholar (1932–2026)

- Born: March 6, 1932; Amarillo, Texas, U.S.
- Died: June 1, 2026 (aged 94); Taos, New Mexico, U.S.
- Occupations: Lawyer, scholar
- Employer: University of Texas School of Law

William Willard Gibson Jr. (March 5, 1932 – June 1, 2026) was an American lawyer and legal scholar. He taught law at the University of Texas School of Law from 1965 to 1998 and also served as the dean of academic affairs.

== Early life ==
Gibson was born in Amarillo, Texas on March 5, 1932. He received a B.A. in government in 1954 and an LL.B with honors in 1956 from the University of Texas at Austin. During law school, he was a member of the Order of the Coif and an editor of the Texas Law Review.

== Career ==
Following graduation, Gibson joined the firm of Gibson, Ochsner, Harlann, Kinney, & Morris in Amarillo, Texas as an associate partner. From 1964 to 1965 he served as the president of the Junior Bar of the State of Texas. He was subsequently recruited by Dean W. Page Keeton of the University of Texas School of Law and joined the faculty in 1965.

Specializing in real property and estates, Professor Gibson taught courses in Texas land titles, real estate transactions, real estate finance, insurance, Texas procedure, wills and estates, fraud and mistake, and professional responsibility. From 1971 to 1973, Gibson took a leave of absence to serve as an attorney advisor to the Federal Power Commission. In 1983, he was named Sylvan Lang professor of law and was also the associate dean for administration and academic Affairs.

Gibson contributed to continuing legal education in Texas in a variety of ways. He was one of the founders of the Mortgage Lending Institute (which was later named in his honor) and helped establish standards for continuing legal education in Texas. The Texas Supreme Court appointed Professor Gibson as provost of judicial education from 1992 to 1993, where he conducted a study of current judicial education programs and recommended courses of action for improving Texas judicial education. Gibson retired in 1998 as a professor emeritus.

He was a charter member of the American College of Real Estate Lawyers, an academic fellow of the American College of Probate Counsel, and a charter member of the Texas Real Estate Academy. He received the Leon Green Award by the Texas Law Review Association, which also established the University of Texas Endowed Presidential Scholarship in law created in his name.

== Personal life and death ==
Gibson resided in New Mexico with his wife, Beth, until her death in 2021. They had four children. He died on June 1, 2026, at the age of 94.

== Sources ==
- http://www.reptl.org/Content/WYSIWYG/WilliamGibson.pdf
