= William A. Reppy =

American judge

William A. Reppy

William Arneill Reppy, Sr. (May 15, 1912 – January 1, 2005) was an Associate Justice of the California Second District Court of Appeal, Division Five, having been appointed to the post by Republican Governor Ronald Reagan in 1968.

== Life and career ==
Born in Ventura, California, Reppy was one of the first graduates of Beverly Hills High School and went on to earn his Bachelor of Arts degree in history in 1934 from Stanford University, where he was a member of the track and field team and Chi Psi fraternity. He earned his LL.B. in 1937 from USC Law School, where he served as editor of the USC Law Review and was also inducted into the Order of the Coif honor society.

After graduating from USC, Reppy worked as an attorney in private practice in Oxnard, California. Upon returning to California after serving in the United States Army during World War II, Reppy served as Assistant City Attorney and then City Attorney of Oxnard from 1946 to 1953.

In 1955, Republican governor Goodwin Knight appointed Reppy to serve as a Judge of the Ventura County Superior Court, where he was the first judge of the Court's Oxnard branch. Reppy left the Superior Court on December 4, 1968, when Governor Ronald Reagan appointed him to serve as an Associate Justice of the California Second District Court of Appeal, Division Five.

Retiring from the Court of Appeal in 1972, Reppy served on the board of visitors for Stanford Law School and as President of the Friends of the Montecito Library.

A resident of the Santa Barbara suburb of Montecito, Reppy died on New Year's Day 2005 of congestive heart failure at the age of 92. He was married for 65 years to fellow Stanford graduate Margot Brownrigg, with whom he had two sons: William, Jr. and Michael, who are also both Stanford alumni.

Legal offices
| New office | Associate Justice of the California Court of Appeal for the Second District, Division Five; December 4, 1968 – May 17, 1972 | Succeeded by Herbert L. Ashby |
