= Jerome H. Kern =

American lawyer (1937–2024)

- Born: June 1, 1937; New York City, U.S.
- Died: December 13, 2024 (aged 87)
- Education: Columbia University (BA); New York University School of Law (JD)
- Occupations: Lawyer, consultant, business executive
- Employer: Moelis & Company
- Known for: Founding partner of Wachtell, Lipton, Rosen & Katz; Former Chairman and CEO of Colorado Symphony; Namesake of the Root-Tilden-Kern Scholarship
- Spouse: Mary Rossick Kern

Jerome H. Kern (June 1, 1937 – December 13, 2024) was an American lawyer, investment banker, consultant, and philanthropist. Kern was one of the founding members of Wachtell, Lipton, Rosen & Katz. After a career in investment banking, he was a senior partner of Shea & Gould, then at Baker Botts, while holding senior leadership positions at Tele-Communications Inc. In the early 2000s, he was CEO of Linkshare, On Command, and Playboy. He was also chairman and CEO of Colorado Symphony and a senior advisor to Moelis & Company.

== Early life and career ==
Kern received his B.A. from Columbia University in 1957. He then graduated from New York University School of Law on a Root-Tilden Scholarship in 1960 and was managing editor of the New York University Law Review.

In 1965, Kern, Herbert Wachtell, Martin Lipton, Leonard Rosen, and George Katz, formed the law firm Wachtell, Lipton, Rosen & Katz. Kern later left the firm to pursue a career in investment banking, running his own brokerage firm J.H. Kern & Company. He returned to law practice, was a partner at Olwine, Connelly, Chase, O’Donnell & Weyher, and eventually becoming an executive committee member of Shea & Gould.

From 1992 to 1998, Kern was a partner at Baker Botts and was the top outside legal counsel to Tele-Communications Inc. and Liberty Media for over twenty years. Described as the right-hand man to John C. Malone, Kern was the architect of TCI's merger with AT&T Corporation and was a director and Vice Chairman of TCI. Malone once referred to Kern as "the dean of cable lawyers." He left the board of Liberty Media in 2004.

Kern was made CEO of Linkshare in 1999. He then was chairman and CEO of On Command, the nation's largest provider of pay-per-view video in hotel rooms from 2000 to 2001.

Beginning in 2001, Kern ran his own consulting firm, Kern Consulting LLC, focusing on clients in the media and telecommunications sectors. He joined the board of Playboy Enterprises in 2002 and w as interim CEO from 2008 to 2009 following the departure of Christie Hefner. Kern departed Playboy's board of directors in 2009. In 2007, he also formed Enki Strategic Advisors, a consulting firm helping companies expand into mobile and multi-platform media technologies.

In 2020, Kern joined Moelis & Company as senior advisor.

== Philanthropy ==
Kern donated $5 million to New York University School of Law and set off a $30 million fundraising campaign for the Root-Tilden Scholarship program. Then NYU Law dean John Sexton renamed the scholarship program Root-Tilden-Kern Scholarship in honor of his generosity. He sat on the law school's board of trustees.

Kern was chairman and CEO of Colorado Symphony from 2016 to 2021 and helped with the symphony's fundraising efforts. Kern took over the symphony in 2011 when it was on the verge of bankruptcy, with $1.2 million in debt, and left the organization with an $88 million endowment at the time of his retirement. As chairman, he hired Andrew Litton as music director of the symphony.

== Personal life and death ==
Kern was married to Mary Rossick Kern. The couple lived at the Four Seasons Hotel and Private Residences Denver.

Kern died from pancreatic cancer on December 13, 2024, at the age of 87.
