= New York University College of Arts and Science =

Liberal arts school of New York University

Coordinates: 40.73023°N 73.99569°W

NYU College of Arts and Science
- Type: Private
- Established: 1832; 194 years ago
- Parent institution: New York University
- Dean: Wendy Suzuki
- Students: 7,660
- Location: 32 Waverly Pl, New York, NY 10003, New York City, New York, 10003, U.S.
- Colors: Mayfair Violet
- Website: cas.nyu.edu

The New York University College of Arts and Science (CAS) is the primary liberal arts college of New York University (NYU).

The school is located near Gould Plaza next to the Courant Institute of Mathematical Sciences and the Stern School of Business, adjoining Washington Square Park in Greenwich Village.

As the oldest and largest college within NYU, the College of Arts and Science currently enrolls 7,660 undergraduate students (as of 2017). CAS enrolls the largest number of undergraduate students for a private liberal arts college in the United States; its size and complexity owe to NYU's overall profile of enrolling the largest number of students in the country for a private, nonprofit, residential, and nonsectarian institution of higher education. The College of Arts and Science offers Bachelor of Arts (B.A.) and Bachelor of Science (B.S.) degrees.

== History ==
In 1914, Washington Square College was established in downtown Manhattan to serve commuter students.

== Academics ==
The college provides an undergraduate liberal arts education through its Core Curriculum. Undergraduate students may select from 66 majors as well as a host of accelerated Bachelor's-Master's and pre-professional programs offered through 30 departments, many of which also offer courses at NYU's 13 study away sites. Additionally, students may select from over 60 minors offered within the College as well as 40 cross-school minors at other colleges within NYU. Admission to the College of Arts and Science is competitive, with an acceptance rate of 4% for the class of 2027.

== Student life ==
=== Clubs and traditions ===
The school also hosts multiple student organizations, including greek life, political, religious, ethnic, and music performance groups (often alongside the Tisch School of Arts).

The university also sponsors some traditions for undergraduates including Apple Fest, the Violet Ball, Strawberry Festival, and the semi-annual midnight breakfast where Student Affairs administrators serve free breakfast to students before finals.

=== Publications and journalism clubs ===
The College of Arts and Science runs several student journalism clubs and publication with the Arthur L. Carter Journalism Institute, including Washington Square News, NYU Local, Washington Square Local, and the literary journals Washington Square Review and The Minetta Review. The university also associated (though not officially affiliated) with the campus comedy magazine, The Plague, which started to poke fun at popular culture as well as campus life and the idiosyncrasies of NYU in 1978.

The university also runs a radio station WNYU-FM 89.1, which broadcasts to the entire New York metropolitan area.

=== Secret societies ===
Several undergraduate secret societies have existed at the College of Arts and Science. Starting in 1832, the Philomathean Society and the Eucleian Society were formed, making rivals of each other. When the Philomathean Society died out, its remnants formed the Andiron Club in 1904. The most selective and famous club on campus is the Red Dragon Society, founded in 1898, which continues to exist to this day. Many notable NYU alumni have been members of these secret societies, including Elmer Ellsworth Brown, Howard Cann, John Harvey Kellogg, Walter Reed, and Frederic Tuten. Edgar Allan Poe was an occasional guest at the Eucleian Society.

== Notable alumni ==
=== Academics ===
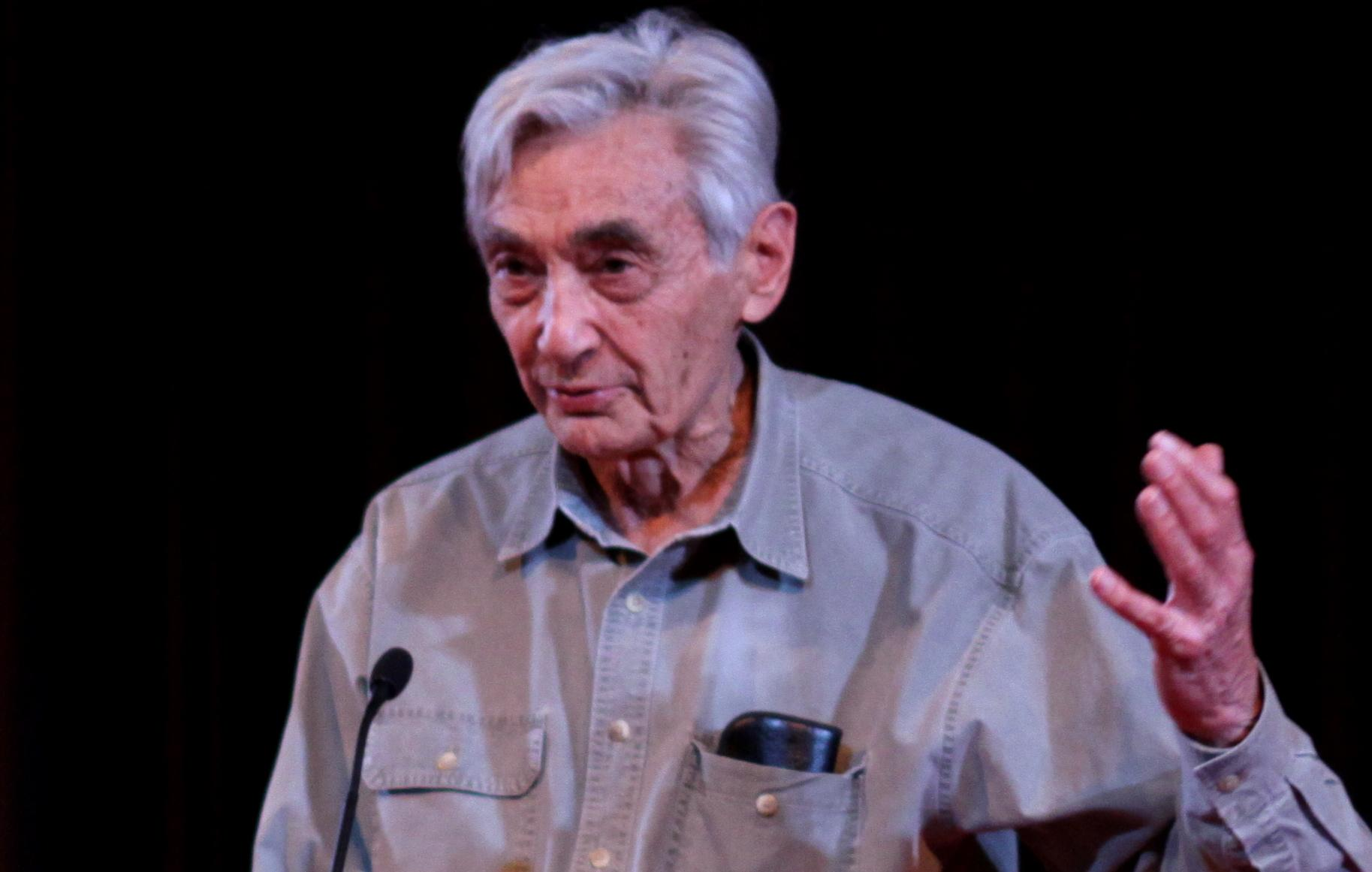
Howard Zinn, Class of 1967

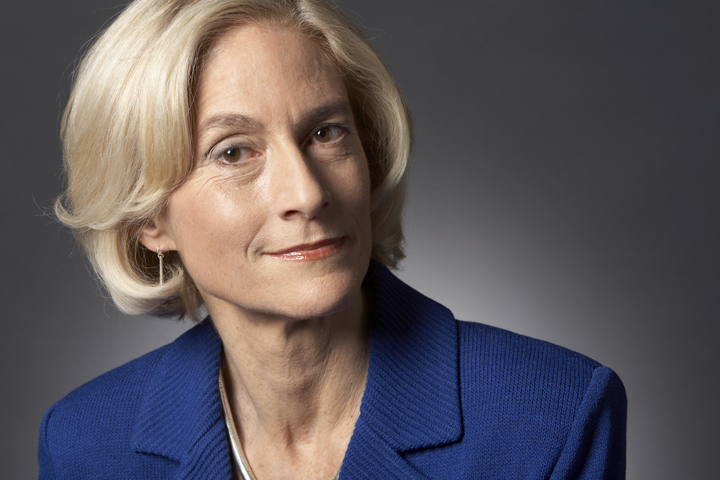
Martha Nussbaum, Class of 1969

- Edward J. Bloustein, B.A. 1948; former president of Rutgers University, New Brunswick, New Jersey
- Lionel Casson, B.A. 1934; classicist, archeologist, professor emeritus at New York University
- Howard Crosby, B.A. 1844; Presbyterian minister and NYU chancellor 1870–1881
- Richard Davidson, B.A. 1972; Professor of Psychology at University of Wisconsin–Madison
- Morris Janowitz, B.A. 1941; founder of military sociology, professor at University of Chicago
- Richard Joel, B.A. 1972; current president of Yeshiva University, New York City
- Joseph Keller, B.A. 1943; 1988 National Medal of Science recipient
- Paul Kurtz, B.A. 1948; Professor Emeritus of Philosophy at the State University of New York at Buffalo
- Ellen Langer, B.A. 1970; Professor of Psychology at Harvard University
- Peter D. Lax, B.A. 1947; mathematician, 2005 Abel Prize recipient, 1986 National Medal of Science recipient
- Sherwin B. Nuland, B.A. 1951; bioethicist, author of How We Die
- Martha Nussbaum, B.A. 1969; philosopher, professor at University of Chicago
- Leonard Peikoff, B.A. 1954; philosopher, leading advocate of Objectivism
- Howard Zinn, B.A. 1951; historian, author of A People's History of the United States

=== Arts, acting, and entertainment ===
- Milton Babbitt, B.A. 1935; composer, 1986 MacArthur Fellow
- Bob Balaban, B.A. 1977; actor
- Neil Diamond (Did not graduate); musician
- David Chase, B.A. 1968; writer, producer, and director
- Tom Ford (Did not graduate); fashion designer and film director
- William Gaines, B.A. 1948; founder of MAD Magazine
- Ilana Glazer, B.A. 2009; co-star and co-creator of the Comedy Central series Broad City
- Ethan Hawke (Did not graduate); actor
- Tom Kirdahy, B.A. 1985; Theater producer and activist
- Stanley Kramer, B.A. 1933; film director
- Ken Leung, B.A. 1992; actor
- Dave Liebman, B.A. 1967; jazz musician
- Leonard Maltin, B.A. 1973; film critic
- Glen Mazzara, B.A. 1989; television producer
- Alan Menken, B.A. 1972; musical theater and film composer
- Valeria Mercer, B.A. 1979; Head Curator of African-American Art (Detroit Institute of Arts)
- Meg Ryan, B.A. 1982; actor
- Martin Scorsese, B.A; 1964; film director, 2006 recipient of Academy Award for Best Director

=== Authors and writers ===
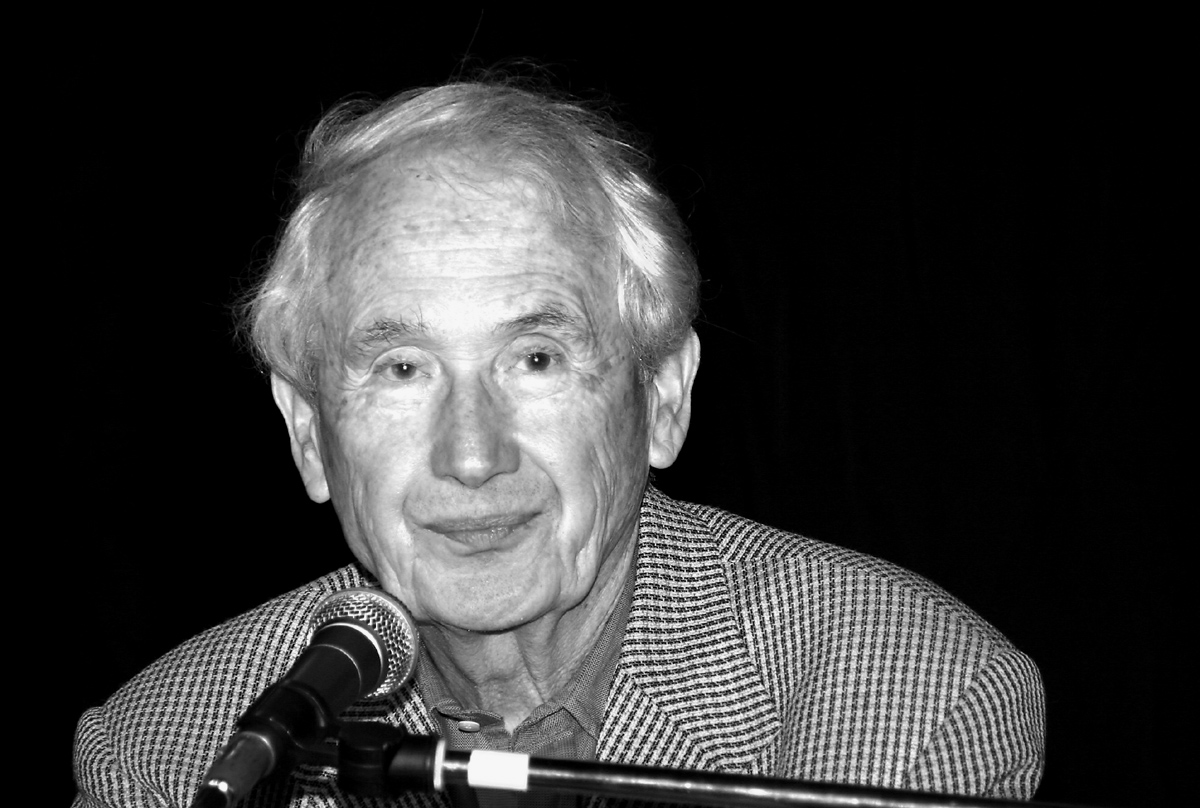
Frank McCourt, Class of 1957

- Warren Adler, B.A. 1947; author of The War of the Roses
- Caleb Carr, B.A. 1977; author
- Elizabeth Gilbert, B.A. 1991; author of Eat, Pray, Love
- Joseph Heller, B.A. 1948; author of Catch-22
- Ira Levin, B.A. 1950; author
- Frank McCourt, Pulitzer Prize for Biography or Autobiography recipient, author of Angela's Ashes
- Cynthia Ozick, B.A. 1930; author
- Kira Peikoff, B.A. 2007; author and journalist
- Charles Simic, B.A. 1967; 1984 MacArthur Fellow, Recipient of 1990 Pulitzer Prize for Poetry, 15th United States Poet Laureate

=== Business ===
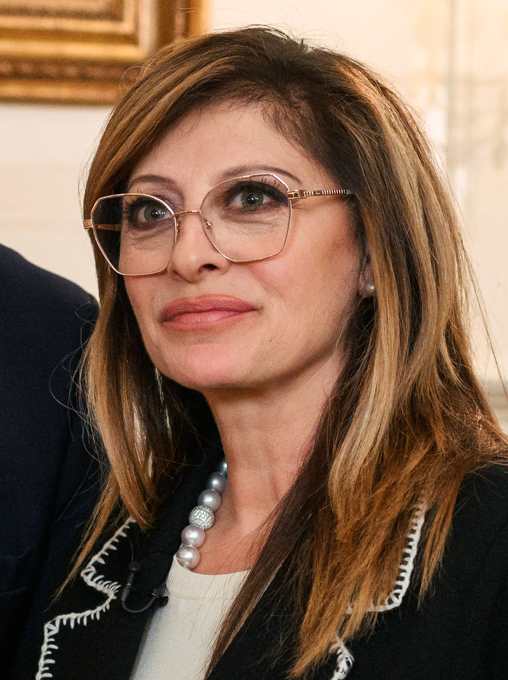
Maria Bartiromo, Class of 1987

- Maria Bartiromo, B.A. 1989; Fox Business Network television journalist
- Clive Davis, B.A. 1953; founder of Arista Records
- Marvin Davis, B.S. 1947; owner of Denver Broncos, billionaire, industrialist
- Jack Dorsey (Did not graduate); co-founder of Twitter and Square, Inc.
- Arthur Frommer, B.A. 1950; tourism industry writer
- Scott Harrison, B.A. 1998; founder and CEO of the non-profit charity: water
- Boris Jordan, B.A. 1988; billionaire, investor
- Don Katz, B.A. 1974; founder of Audible
- Henry Kaufman, B.A. 1948; president of Henry Kaufman & Company, Inc.
- Mildred Robbins Leet, B.A. 1942; entrepreneur and philanthropist
- Mark Leslie, B.A. 1966; venture capitalist and founder of Veritas Technologies
- Joseph Nacchio, B.S. 1970; former chairman and chief executive officer of Qwest Communications International
- Marc Rich (Did not graduate); commodities trader, billionaire, fugitive
- Larry Silverstein, B.A. 1952; billionaire, real estate investor
- Sy Syms, B.A. 1946; founder of Syms Clothing

=== Journalism ===
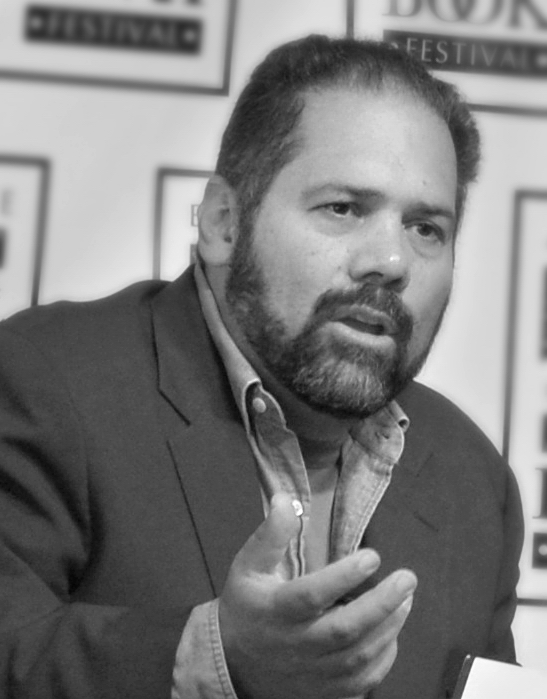
Ray Suarez, Class of 1985

- Lynda Baquero, B.A. 1974; correspondent for WNBC
- Don Hewitt, B.A. 1941; television producer, creator of 60 Minutes
- Ray Suarez, B.A. 1985; broadcast journalist, host of Inside Story on Al Jazeera America
- Alvin Toffler, B.A. 1949; futurist, writer, journalist
- Gene Weingarten, B.A. 1973; Washington Post journalist, two-time Pulitzer Prize winner

=== Law ===
- Constance Baker Motley, B.A. 1940; civil rights activist, judge, state senator, Borough President of Manhattan
- Evan Chesler, B.A. 1970; partner and former chairman, Cravath, Swaine & Moore
- Jonathan Lippman, B.A. 1965; Chief Judge of the New York Court of Appeals
- Victor Marrero, B.A. 1963; United States federal senior judge
- Janai Nelson, B.A. 1993; President and Director-Counsel, NAACP Legal Defense Fund
- Herbert Wachtell, B.S. 1952; co-founder of the law firm of Wachtell, Lipton, Rosen & Katz

=== Politics and government ===
- Jerome Anthony Ambro, B.A. 1955; US Congressman
- Bill de Blasio, B.A. 1984; 109th Mayor of New York City
- Irwin Delmore Davidson, B.S. 1927; US Congressman
- Thomas De Witt Talmage, B.A. 1853; preacher, religious leader, social reformer
- Steven Boghos Derounian, B.A. 1938; US Congressman
- William Henry Draper, Jr., B.S. 1916; first U.S. Permanent Representative to NATO
- Fernando Ferrer, B.A. 1972; former Bronx Borough president and 2005 Democratic nominee for Mayor of New York
- Henry Grunwald, B.A. 1944; U.S. ambassador; former managing editor of Time magazine and editor in chief of Time, Inc.
- Sean Hannity (did not graduate); political commentator
- Frank L. Howley, B.S. 1925; brigadier general, commandant of the American sector of Berlin
- Jacob Javits, B.A. 1923; US Senator from New York from 1957 to 1981
- Samuel Levy, B.A. 1894; Manhattan Borough President
- Martha Roby, B.A. 1998; US Congresswoman
- Albert del Rosario, B.S. 1960; former Philippine ambassador to the US and Philippine Foreign Affairs Secretary

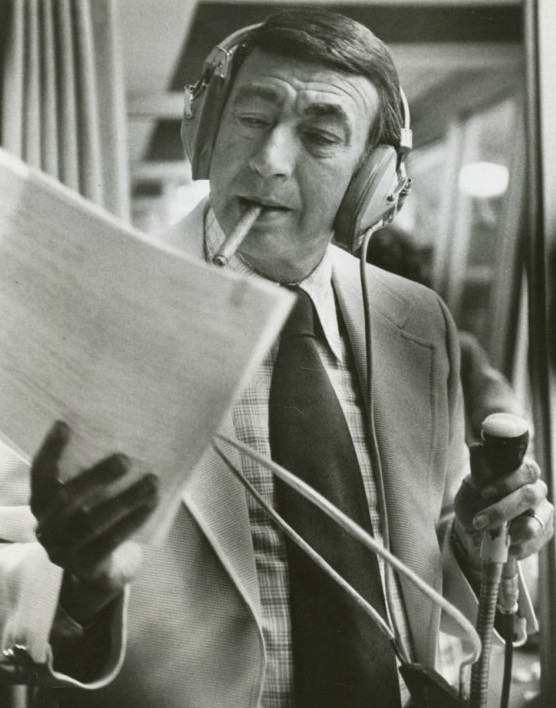
Howard Cosell, Class of 1938

=== Science and technology ===
- Balamurali Ambati, B.A. 1991; youngest person ever to become a physician
- Evelyn Berezin, B.S. 1951; computer engineer
- Eugene Braunwald, B.A. 1949; cardiologist
- Humayun Chaudhry, B.A., 1986; president and CEO, Federation of State Medical Boards
- Avery Fisher, B.S. 1929; inventor of the transistorized amplifier and the first stereo radio-phonograph, noted philanthropist
- Neil Garg, B.S. 2000; Professor of Chemistry at University of California, Los Angeles
- Chris Harrison, B.S. 2005; computer scientist and entrepreneur, associate professor at Carnegie Mellon University
- Henry Sherwood Lawrence, B.A. 1938; immunologist
- Alfred Vail, B.A. 1836; inventor
- George Wald, B.A. 1927; recipient of 1967 Nobel Prize in Physiology or Medicine

=== Sports ===
- Marv Albert, B.A. 1965; sportscaster
- Howard Cann, B.A. 1920; 1968 Naismith Basketball Hall of Fame Inductee
- Howard Cosell, B.A. 1938; sportscaster
- Carol Heiss, B.A. 1961; gold medal winner, Olympic Winter Games 1960
- Mika'il Sankofa, B.A. 1988; fencer, Olympic Gold Medalist
- Dolph Schayes, B.S. 1948, NBA champion (1955), 12× NBA All-Star, Hall of Fame Inductee
- Ed Smith, B.A. 1934; model for Heisman Trophy
- George Spitz, B.A. 1934; world record high jumper
- Colin Cassady, B.S.; WWE wrestler
