= Root-Tilden-Kern Scholarship =

Public interest award at NYU's law school

The Root-Tilden-Kern Scholarship is a full-tuition public service scholarship for students at New York University School of Law.

== The program ==
The Root-Tilden-Kern Program looks for students with a demonstrated commitment to the public interest, exceptional leadership ability, and a history of academic achievement. In assessing these criteria, the program looks at the whole person and considers previous life experience and professional work. The program values diversity and strives to select a class that is diverse in terms of race, sex, class, ethnicity, sexual orientation, geographic origins, and ideology. Interested candidates should submit an application with their application to New York University School of Law. The application is reviewed by a student and faculty committee before recommendation for an interview. Each year, approximately 50 applicants are invited to interview with a panel composed of a faculty member, a judge, a practitioner and third-year scholars. Twenty scholars are selected for each incoming class. Scholars are expected to work in public service for a minimum of five years after graduation or the completion of judicial clerkships.

== History ==
In the 1950s, Dean Emeritus Arthur Vanderbilt conceived of the Root-Tilden Scholarship to transform NYU from a local law school to a nationally and internationally esteemed institution. Founded in 1951, the purpose of the program was to "train promising young men so as to help attain again for the American bar the high position which it once held as the reservoir of altruistic and competent public leadership."

The program was named for two alumni, Elihu Root and Samuel Tilden, who exemplified Vanderbilt's ideal – lawyers dedicated to public leadership. Twenty scholars were selected for the first class from each of the country's then ten judicial circuits. Scholars were at first required to take special courses in the humanities, social sciences, history and natural sciences and required to live together and share mealtimes five days a week. Scholars met with leaders in government, industry and finance. In 1969, after a campaign by student groups, the first women were admitted to the Root Program. To date, more than 800 Root-Tilden Scholars have graduated from NYU School of Law.

In 1998, then Dean John Sexton announced a precedent-setting gift of $5 million from an alumnus of the Root-Tilden Scholarship, Jerome H. Kern (class of 1960), that began a major capital campaign to raise $30 million for the program. To honor Kern's generous contribution, the Law School renamed the program as the Root-Tilden-Kern Scholarship Program. Kern is the chairman of Symphony Media Systems, LLC, and was formerly a senior partner of the law firm Baker & Botts. In 2004, under the leadership of Dean Richard Revesz, the Law School successfully completed its campaign goal of $30 million and now offers full-tuition scholarships to 20 students each year.

== Notable scholars ==
- Lamar Alexander, 1965, U.S. Senator (R-Tennessee)
- Vicki Been, 1983, New York City Deputy Mayor of Housing and Economic Development
- Jeremy Ben-Ami, 1990, executive director, J Street
- Pasco Middleton Bowman II, senior judge, U.S. Court of Appeals for the Eighth Circuit
- Julie Brill, 1985, commissioner, Federal Trade Commission
- Thomas Buergenthal, 1960, judge, International Court of Justice
- Arthur B. Culvahouse, Jr., 1973, partner, O'Melveny & Myers LLP
- Diana DeGette, 1982, U.S. House of Representatives (D-Colorado)
- Jim Exum, 1960, former Chief Justice, Supreme Court of North Carolina
- Anthony Foxx, 1996, Secretary of Transportation, U.S. Department of Transportation
- Michael Gerrard, 1978, professor at Columbia Law School, partner of Arnold & Porter
- John Greaney, 1963, associate justice, Massachusetts Supreme Court
- Keith Harper, 1994, partner in Kilpatrick Stockton and judge of several Native American nations
- Seth Harris, 1990, deputy secretary, U.S. Department of Labor
- Steven W. Hawkins, 1988, executive vice-president, NAACP
- Sharon Kang Hom, executive director, Human Rights in China
- Richard Joel, president, Yeshiva University
- Herbert Kelleher, co-founder and former chairman and CEO of Southwest Airlines
- Dorchen Leidholdt, 1988, legal director, Sanctuary for Families
- Carolyn N. Lerner, 1989, judge, United States Court of Federal Claims
- Martin Lipton, 1954, founding partner, Wachtell, Lipton, Rosen, and Katz
- Nancy Lublin, 2001, creator of Dress for Success and CEO of Do Something
- Bridget McCormack, Michigan Supreme Court Justice; professor of law; founder and co-director of the Michigan Innocence Clinic at the University of Michigan Law School
- Doug McFarland, professor, Hamline University and former U.S. Senate Candidate from Minnesota
- Roger M. Milgrim, 1961, author, Milgrim on Trade Secrets and Milgrim on Licensing
- James Milliken, Chancellor, University of Texas System
- Geri Palast, 1976, executive director, Campaign for Fiscal Equality
- Peter Pitegoff, dean, University of Maine Law School
- Stewart G. Pollock, 1957, former New Jersey Supreme Court Justice
- Connie Rice, civil rights activist, co-founder of Advancement Project
- Jenny Rivera, 1985, Associate Judge of the Court of Appeals, State of New York
- Frank Tuerkheimer, 1963, associate Watergate special prosecutor; U.S. Attorney for the Western District of Wisconsin; professor, University of Wisconsin Law School; Holocaust and Eichmann trial scholar
- Herbert Wachtell, 1954, founding partner, Wachtell, Lipton, Rosen, and Katz
- Jenny R. Yang, 1996, Commissioner of the US Equal Employment Opportunity Commission
