= WLRK =

WLRK may refer to:

- Wachtell, Lipton, Rosen & Katz, a prominent law firm
- WLRK (FM), a radio station (91.5 FM) licensed to Greenville, Mississippi, United States
