= Frank Tuerkheimer =

American lawyer (1939–2023)

U.S. Attorney for the Western District of Wisconsin
- In office 1977–1981
- President: Jimmy Carter
- Preceded by: David C. Mebane
- Succeeded by: John R. Byrnes

Personal details
- Born: Frank Mitchel Tuerkheimer; July 27, 1939 New York City, U.S.
- Died: September 16, 2023 (aged 84) Madison, Wisconsin, U.S.
- Education: Columbia University (BA); New York University Law School (LLB)

Frank Mitchel Tuerkheimer (July 27, 1939 – September 16, 2023) was an American lawyer, legal professor, and prosecutor. He was an associate Watergate special prosecutor and served as the U.S. attorney for the Western District of Wisconsin. He was also an emeritus professor of law at the University of Wisconsin Law School.

== Biography ==
Tuerkheimer was born in New York City on July 27, 1939. His father was a cattle merchant who fled Nazi Germany to become a New York butcher. He graduated from the Bronx High School of Science in 1956 and received his B.A. from Columbia University in 1960. He received his LL.B. from New York University School of Law in 1963 as a Root-Tilden Scholar and notes editor of the New York University Law Review. After law school he worked as a clerk for Judge Edward Weinfeld of the United States District Court for the Southern District of New York.

His first public post was legal assistant to the attorney general of Swaziland and helped write the country's first constitution. In 1965, Tuerkheimer returned to the United States and became an assistant to Robert Morgenthau, then the United States Attorney for the Southern District of New York. He was assistant U.S. attorney until 1970, when he joined the faculty of the University of Wisconsin Law School.

From 1973 to 1975, Tuerkheimer served as an associate special prosecutor to the Watergate Special Prosecution Force, taking a leave of absence from his teaching position. As prosecutor, he led the investigation into illegal dairy industry contributions and was chief trial counsel in the case against John Connally.

Tuerkheimer was appointed by President Jimmy Carter to serve as U.S. attorney for the Western District of Wisconsin in 1977 and served in that position until 1981.

Tuerkheimer wrote about Holocaust trials as well as the Eichmann trial. His other areas of research focused on evidence and litigation.

== Personal life and death ==
Tuerkheimer married Barbara Wolfson in 1968, and the couple had two children. His daughter, Deborah Tuerkheimer, is the Class of 1967 James B. Haddad Professor of Law at Northwestern University Pritzker School of Law.

Frank Tuerkheimer died on September 16, 2023, at the age of 84.
