= Daniel S. Greenspan =

American biomedical scientist

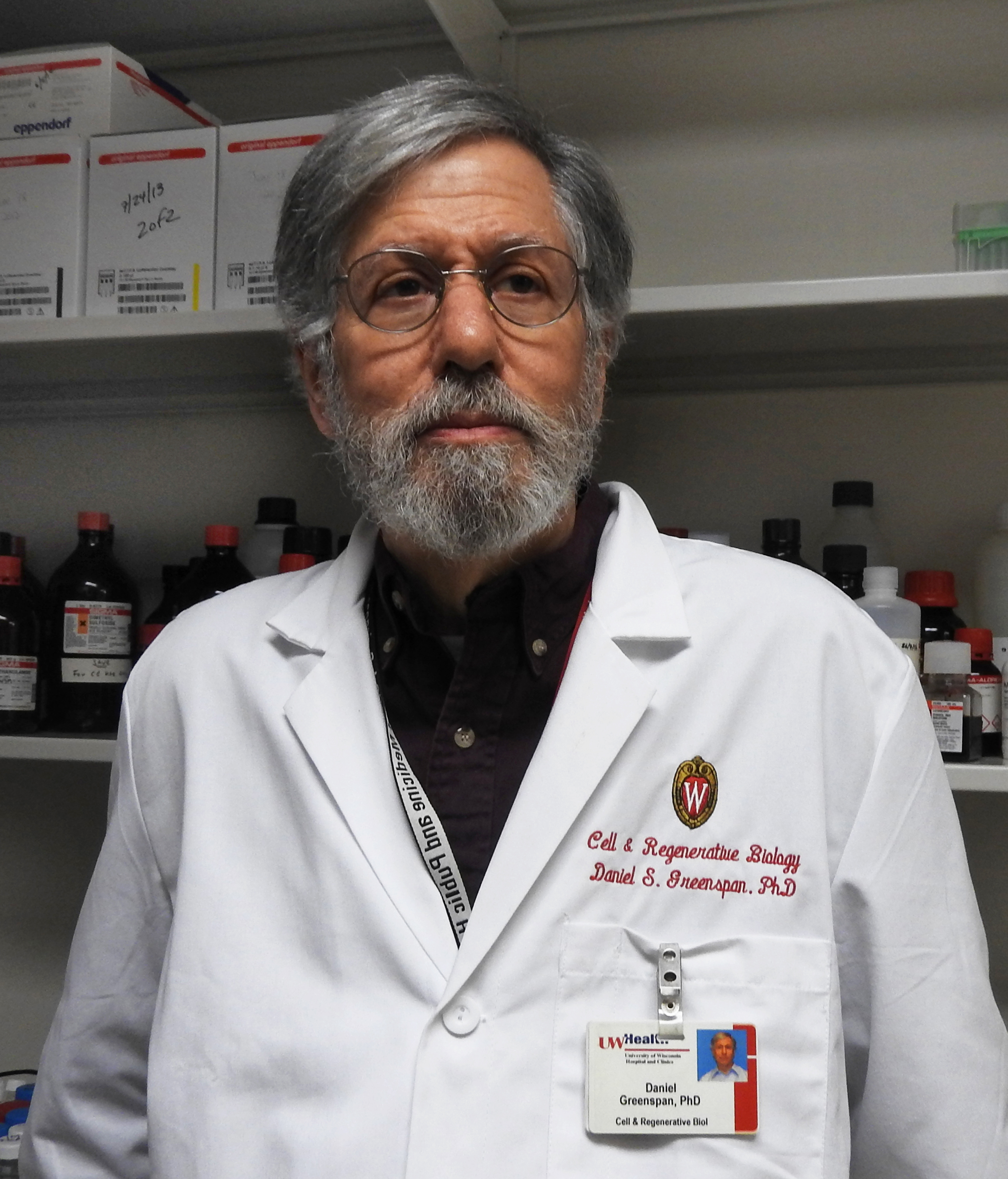
- Born: August 31, 1951 (age 75); Jersey City, NJ, USA
- Occupations: American biomedical scientist, academic and researcher
- Awards: Arthritis Foundation Fellowship; Kellett Professorship, University of Wisconsin-Madison.

Academic background
- Education: B.A. M.S. Ph.D.
- Alma mater: New York University
- Thesis: The Simian Virus 40 Large T antigen.48K Host Tumor Antigen Complex (1981)

Daniel S. Greenspan is an American biomedical scientist, academic and researcher. He is Kellett professor of Cell and Regenerative Biology at the University of Wisconsin-Madison School of Medicine and Public Health. He has authored over 120 publications. His research has mainly focused on genes encoding proteins of the extracellular space and possible links between defects in such genes and human development and disease.

== Education ==
Greenspan studied at New York University College of Arts & Science and graduated in 1974. His graduate studies were on the SV40 large T-Ag oncogene of the SV40 DNA virus. He received his master's degree in 1978, and Doctoral degree in 1981 from New York University Medical School.

== Career ==
Following his Doctoral degree, Greenspan joined Yale University School of Medicine as a Postdoctoral fellow in the Department of Genetics. In 1984, he was appointed as an Associate Research Scientist in the Department of Genetics and was supported by a fellowship from the Arthritis Foundation. His postdoctoral studies at Yale included analysis of RNA splicing and identification of new human HLA genes. He subsequently joined the University of Wisconsin-Madison School of Medicine in 1986 as assistant professor in the Department of Pathology and Laboratory Medicine. Greenspan was promoted to Associate Professor in 1992, and became a Professor in 1997.

From 2010 – 2014 Greenspan served as founding/interim chair of the Department of Cell and Regenerative Biology at the University of Wisconsin School of Medicine and Public Health. Prior to that, he was Vice Chair for Research in the Department of Pathology and Laboratory Medicine from 2003 to 2006.

== Research ==
Greenspan has worked on genes and gene products important to vertebrate development and human disease. He has particularly focused on roles of the extracellular matrix (ECM) and extracellular regulatory proteins that control and orchestrate ECM formation and growth factor/morphogen signaling in development, homeostasis and disease. Such focus has included study of the effects of extracellular proteins in adipocyte biology, pre-diabetic symptoms, atherosclerosis, and organ transplant rejection. The Greenspan lab has developed a number of genetically modified mouse models that have enabled studies that have garnered insights into embryonic patterning, bone formation, adipocyte biology, cardiovascular development and homeostasis. His disease-related studies have probed the bases of heritable connective tissue disorders, and have touched on atherosclerosis, metabolic disorders, organ transplant rejection, and wound healing.

=== Human Diseases and Gene Mutations ===
Greenspan has conducted various research projects directly on the molecular bases of human diseases. A collaborative study with a group at Jefferson Medical College showed mutations in the COL7A1 gene, for type VII collagen, to be the basis of the disabling and fatal skin disease dystrophic epidermolysis bullosa These studies also led to elucidation of the complete intron-exon structure of COL7A1 which at the time had more exons than any previously described gene. His lab was the first to clone and characterize the α1 chain of type V collagen and was also key in the first demonstration that mutations in a type V collagen gene can cause the heritable connective tissue disorder classic Ehers-Danlos syndrome. Accompanying and following these studies, the Greenspan lab has performed studies on collagen V genes and on the biosynthesis of type V collagen and on the molecular mechanisms whereby mutations in type V collagen result in defects in mammalian tissues. Their studies have also shown autoimmunity against type V collagen to be involved in organ transplant rejection and atherosclerosis, and that induction of immune tolerance to type V collagen can help ameliorate atherosclerosis. The Greenspan lab was also the first to clone and characterize the α3 chain of type V collagen and showed the α3(V) chain to be important to the functioning of certain highly specialized cell types and to be important to tumor growth and survival times in breast cancer.

The Greenspan lab was also involved in studies showing that mutations that affect the protease BMP-1 underlie some cases of osteogenesis imperfecta (brittle bone disease), and showing molecular mechanisms involved.

=== Bone Morphogenetic Protein 1-like proteinases ===
In a study in 1996, Greenspan's lab showed that Bone Morphogenetic Protein 1 (BMP-1) is a protease responsible for the biosynthetic processing of the precursor protein procollagen I into type I collagen, the most abundant protein in the bodies of vertebrates. The lab also helped define the interactions of BMP1 with morphogens involved in dorsoventral patterning in early embryogenesis. They also were responsible, via various studies, for identifying and characterizing the other mammalian BMP1-like proteinases (BMP1-LPs), showing them to be a small family of proteases that activate and inactivate various growth factors, particularly a subset of the TGFβ superfamily; activate enzymes, such as lysyl oxidase, and biosynthetically process various extracellular structural macromolecules. In fact, the lab provided the preponderance of insights into biological roles of these extracellular proteases that are key to development and homeostasis and to ECM formation, and are important to formation of the cardiovascular system, wound healing, periodontal homeostasis and tooth development, and regulation of nodal Na+ channel clustering in formation of the nodes of Ranvier during neuronal development.

== Awards and honors ==
- 2005 - Kellett Professorship, University of Wisconsin Madison

== Bibliography ==
- Christiano, A. M., Greenspan, D. S., Hoffman, G. G., Zhang, X., Tamai, Y., Lin, A.N., Dietz, H.C., Hovnanian, A., & Uitto, J (1993). A missense mutation in type VII collagen in two affected siblings with recessive dystrophic epidermolysis bullosa. Nature Genet. 462–66.
- Toriello, H. V., Glover, T. W., Takahara, K., Byers, P., Miller, D. E., Higgins, J. V., & Greenspan, D. S. (1996). A translocation interrupt the COL5A1 gene in a patient with Ehlers-Danlos syndrome and hypomelanosis of Ito. Nature Genet 13, 361–365.
- Kessler, E., Takahara, K., Biniaminov, L., Brusel, M., & Greenspan, D. S. (1996). Bone morphogenetic protein-1: the type I procollagen C-proteinase. Science, 271(5247), 360–362.
- Clark, T. G., Conway, S. J., Scott, I. C., Labosky, P. A., Winnier, G., Bundy, J., Hogan, B. L. M., & Greenspan, D. S. (1999). The mammalian tolloid-like 1 gene, Tll1, is necessary for normal septation and positioning of the heart. Development 126, 2631–2642.
- Scott, I. C., Blitz, I. L., Pappano, W. N., Maas, S. A., Cho, K. W. Y., & Greenspan, D. S. (2001). Twisted gastrulation homologs are extracellular cofactors in antagonism of BMP signaling. Nature 410, 475–478.
- Dart, M. L., Jankowska-Gan, E., Huang, G., Roenneburg, D. A., Keller, M. R., Torrealba, J. R., Rhoads, A., Marshall-Case, S., Kim, B., Bobadilla, J. L., Haynes, L. D., Wilkes, D. S., Burlingham, W. J., & Greenspan, D. S. (2010). IL-17-dependent autoimmunity to collagen type V in atherosclerosis. Circ Res 107, 1106–1116.
- Huang, G., Ge, G., Wang, D., Gopalakrishnan, B., Butz, D. H., Colman, R. J., Nagy, A., & Greenspan, D. S. (2011). α3(V) collagen is critical for glucose homeostasis due to effects in islets and peripheral tissues in mice. J Clin Invest 121, 769–783.
- Huang, G., Ge, G., Izzi, V., & Greenspan, D. S. (2017). α3(V) chains of type V collagen regulate breast tumour growth via glypican-1-mediated effects. Nature Comm 8, doi:10.1038/ncomms14351.
