= Chesler =

Chesler may refer to:

== Locations ==
- a village in the Romanian commune of Micăsasa
- the Chesler River, in Romania

== People ==
- Oliver Chesler, musician better known as the Horrorist
- Harry "A" Chesler, a comic book publisher
  - the Chesler Studio, which he ran
- Phyllis Chesler, an academic
- Evan Chesler, a lawyer
- Stanley R. Chesler, a judge
