= New York University Law Review =

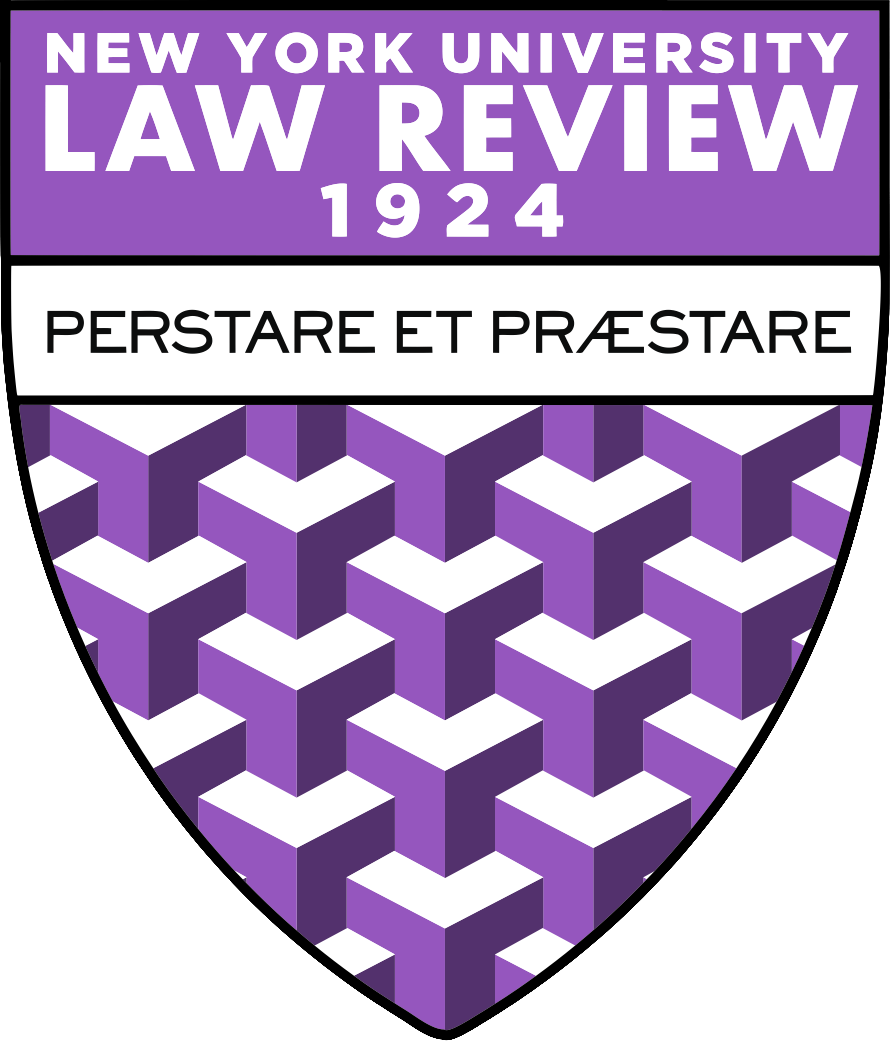
- Discipline: Legal studies
- Language: English

Publication details
- Former names: Annual Review of the Law School of New York University; New York University Law Quarterly Review
- History: 1924–present
- Publisher: New York University School of Law (United States)
- Frequency: Bimonthly
- Impact factor: 2.427 (2021)

Standard abbreviations
- Bluebook: N.Y.U. L. Rev.
- ISO 4: N. Y. Univ. Law Rev.

Indexing
- ISSN: 0028-7881
- LCCN: 31004260
- OCLC no.: 46988231

Links
- Journal homepage

The New York University Law Review is a bimonthly general law review covering legal scholarship in all areas, including legal theory and policy, environmental law, legal history, and international law. The journal was established in 1924 as a collaborative effort between law students and members of the local bar. Its first editor-in-chief was Paul D. Kaufman. Between 1924 and 1950, it was at times known as the Annual Review of the Law School of New York University and the New York University Law Quarterly Review before obtaining its ongoing name in 1950.

== Selection ==
Each year, the journal selects 52 new members from a class of approximately 450. Members are selected using a competitive process, which takes into account performance in a writing competition, and potential to contribute to diversity on the journal.

== Abstracting and indexing ==
The journal is abstracted and indexed in:

- Current Contents/Business Collection
- Current Contents/Social and Behavioral Sciences
- EBSCO databases
- HeinOnline
- International Bibliography of Periodical Literature
- International Bibliography of the Social Sciences
- Modern Language Association Database
- ProQuest databases
- Scopus
- Social Sciences Citation Index

According to the Journal Citation Reports, the journal has a 2021 impact factor of 2.427.

== Lawsuit over discrimination against white males ==
On October 6, 2018, a group called "Faculty, Alumni, and Students Opposed to Racial Preferences" filed a lawsuit in the United States District Court for the Southern District of New York against the review over discrimination against white males in selecting staff editors and articles to publish. The challengers lost at trial and again on appeal to the United States Court of Appeals for the Second Circuit. The Supreme Court of the United States declined to review the case.

== Alumni ==
Prominent alumni of the New York University Law Review include:

- Hakeem Jeffries, Minority Leader of the 118th Congress
- Breon Peace, United States attorney for the Eastern District of New York.
- Phil Weiser, 39th Attorney General of Colorado
- Rudy Giuliani, 107th Mayor of New York City
- Evan Chesler, former chairman of Cravath, Swaine & Moore
- Martin Lipton, co-founder of Wachtell, Lipton, Rosen & Katz,
- Leonard Rosen, co-founder of Wachtell, Lipton, Rosen & Katz
- Herbert Wachtell, co-founder of Wachtell, Lipton, Rosen & Katz
- George Katz, co-founder of Wachtell, Lipton, Rosen & Katz

== Notable articles ==
The journal has published the following notable articles:

- Karl N. Llewellyn, Through Title to Contract and a Bit Beyond, 15 N.Y.U. L.Q. Rev. 159 (1938)
- Hugo L. Black, The Bill of Rights, 35 N.Y.U. L. Rev. 865 (1960)
- Earl Warren, The Bill of Rights and the Military, 37 N.Y.U. L. Rev. 181 (1962)
- Clyde W. Summers, Individual Rights in Collective Agreements and Arbitration, 37 N.Y.U. L. Rev. 362 (1962)
- Henry J. Friendly, In Praise of Erie--And of the New Federal Common Law, 39 N.Y.U. L. Rev. 383 (1964)
- Robert A. Leflar, Choice-Influencing Considerations in Conflict Law, 41 N.Y.U. L. Rev. 267 (1966)
- Anthony G. Amsterdam, The Supreme Court and the Rights of Suspects in Criminal Cases, 45 N.Y.U. L. Rev. 785 (1970)
- Ronald Dworkin, The Forum of Principle, 56 N.Y.U. L. Rev. 469 (1981)
- William J. Brennan, Jr., The Bill of Rights and the States: The Revival of State Constitutions as Guardians of Individual Rights, 61 N.Y.U. L. Rev. 535 (1986)
- Richard L. Revesz, Rehabilitating Interstate Competition: Rethinking the 'Race-to-the-Bottom' Rationale for Federal Environmental Regulation, 67 N.Y.U. L. Rev. 1210 (1992)
- Russell G. Pearce, The Professionalism Paradigm Shift: Why Discarding Professional Ideology Will Improve the Conduct and Reputation of the Bar, 70 N.Y.U. L. Rev. 1229 (1995)
- Yochai Benkler, Free as the Air to Common Use: First Amendment Constraints on Enclosure of the Public Domain, 74 L. Rev. 354 (1999)
- Jon D. Hanson & Douglas A. Kysar, Taking Behavioralism Seriously: The Problem of Market Manipulation, 74 N.Y.U. L. Rev. 630 (1999)
- Jody Freeman, The Private Role in Public Governance, 75 N.Y.U. L. Rev. 543 (2000)
- Stephen Breyer, Our Democratic Constitution, 77 N.Y.U. L. Rev. 245 (2002)
- Lisa Schultz Bressman, Beyond Accountability: Arbitrariness and Legitimacy in the Administrative State, 78 N.Y.U. L. Rev. 461 (2003)
- Jack M. Balkin, Digital Speech and Democratic Culture: A Theory of Freedom of Expression for the Information Society, 79 N.Y.U. L. Rev. 1 (2004)
- Richard A. Nagareda, Class Certification in the Age of Aggregate Proof, 84 N.Y.U. L. Rev. 97 (2009)
- Arthur R. Miller, Simplified Pleading, Meaningful Days in Court, and Trials on the Merits: Reflections on the Deformation of Federal Procedure, 88 N.Y.U. L. Rev. 286 (2013)
