= William Savitt =

American lawyer & lecturer (born 1964)

- Born: 1964 (age 61–62); United States
- Other name: Bill Savitt
- Education: Brown University; Columbia University
- Occupations: Lawyer, academic
- Employer: Wachtell, Lipton, Rosen & Katz
- Known for: Significant role in several high-profile legal cases including the Acquisition of Twitter by Elon Musk

William "Bill" Savitt (born 1964) is an American attorney. He was a partner at the law firm of Wachtell, Lipton, Rosen & Katz until July 2026, when he moved to Gibson, Dunn & Crutcher LLP. He has played a significant role in several high-profile legal cases, including the Acquisition of Twitter by Elon Musk, Corwin v. KKR Financial, and the merger of the New York Stock Exchange with the InterContinental Exchange.

Savitt is an adjunct professor and a member of the Dean's Council at Columbia Law School, and serves on the board of the Columbia Law Review.

== Early life and education ==
Savitt was born in 1964 and earned a Bachelor of Arts degree from Brown University magna cum laude in 1986. After graduating from Brown, Savitt worked as a taxicab driver and musician in New York City, playing in independent rock venues such as CBGBs.

Afterwards he took graduate studies in French legal history at Columbia University, earning a Master of Philosophy degree before completing his legal studies at Columbia Law School in 1997. During this time in law school, Savitt was the editor-in-chief of the Columbia Law Review.

== Career ==
=== Legal ===
After graduating from law school, Savitt clerked for Judge Pierre Leval of the US Court of Appeals in 1997 and for Justice Ruth Bader Ginsburg of the US Supreme Court the following year.

Savitt joined Wachtell, Lipton, Rosen & Katz in 1999, focusing on commercial litigation. His practice areas include mergers and acquisitions, proxy contests, corporate governance disputes, class action suits alleging breach of fiduciary duty, and regulatory enforcement actions related to corporate transactions.

Savitt has been lead trial counsel in numerous high-profile corporate, commercial, and securities lawsuits. In the Delaware case of Corwin vs. KKR Financial, for example, Savitt successfully argued that the vote of KKR & Co.'s independent shareholders to accept a merger should be respected by the courts of the business judgement rule. In a similar case, Savitt represented Meta to successfully urge the Delaware Supreme Court to adopt a new rule governing the right of stockholders to bring derivative litigation.

Savitt has represented acquirers and targets in dozens of contested litigations. For example, represented the New York Stock Exchange (NYSE) in its merger with the InterContinental Exchange (ICE), ensuring that the merger met all legal and regulatory standards. He also defended Vulcan Materials Company against a takeover attempt by Martin Marietta Materials in 2012. In 2014 he represented Sotheby's, in a case that established the viability of the "poison pill" defense against activist investors. Among others, Savitt has represented Elon Musk and Tesla, Inc., Cigna, Amazon, and Brad Pitt. The Times of London reported that "if you read the Wall Street Journal, you might as well be looking at Bill Savitt's daily calendar."

In 2023, Savitt was named co-chair of the Wachtell, Lipton, Rosen & Katz Executive Committee. Savitt also chaired the Firm’s Litigation Department. He is a member of the American Law Institute.

=== Twitter, Inc. v. Elon R. Musk, et al. ===
In 2022, Savitt led Wachtell, Lipton, Rosen & Katz to represent Twitter (now X) in its contract dispute with Elon Musk, who had sought to withdraw from the $44 billion acquisition. During pretrial, Savitt argued that Musk's attempt to exit the deal lacked a legal basis and countered Musk's request to delay the trial as a strategy to avoid fulfilling the agreement. He also highlighted how Twitter complied in providing Musk's team with substantial data access, countering Musk's claims for more information as a pretext for exiting the deal. The Delaware Court of Chancery, under Chancellor Kathaleen McCormick, granted and expedited hearing, and the trial was scheduled for October 2022. Musk eventually agreed to proceed with the acquisition on its original terms.

Since the Twitter engagement, Savitt has continued to be involved in major business lawsuits. Coinbase's 2023 suit against the United States Securities Exchange Commission which argued cryptocurrencies are not securities as defined by federal law.

In 2025, Savitt led the representation of OpenAI in its suit against Elon Musk and others, including the denial of Musk's takeover bid of the AI platform. In 2025, the Governor of Delaware hired Savitt to defend against litigation challenging the constitutionality of amendments to the state’s corporation law; the Supreme Court ruled in the Governor’s favor in a landmark decision upholding the revised corporate law regime.

Savitt also counseled Warner Brothers in litigation against Paramount Sky Dance concerning Warner Brothers’ possible agreement with Netflix.

=== Sports ===
Savitt been involved in multiple sports law negotiations and disputes. Long-time Minnesota Timberwolves owner Glen Taylor tried to back out of his agreement to sell the team to, and Savitt led a group with Alex Rodriguez for the successful arbitration to require the sale to go through. Savitt represented the Cleveland Browns in their dispute with the City of Cleveland regarding the construction of a new stadium.

=== Academic ===
Savitt is an adjunct professor at Columbia Law School, where he teaches transactional litigation and is a member of the Board of Trustees of the Columbia Law Review. He has published articles in the University of Virginia Law Review, the Columbia Law Review, Cornell Law Review, and others. He contributes articles and securities law to various legal platforms, including the National Law Journal.

Diet

Savitt maintains a famously spartan diet, which consists purely of almonds and carbonated water during the day.

== Awards ==
Savitt has been recognized by Chambers USA as a "Star Individual" in securities litigation. He has also been named by Lawdragon as one of its 500 Leading Lawyers, 500 Leading Litigators, and 100 Leading AI & Legal Tech Advisors, and has been inducted into the Benchmark Litigation Hall of Fame.

In 2026, Savitt was recognized as one of the 500 leading lawyers America in 2026 by Law Dragon.
