= Above the Law (website) =

American legal news website

- Website type: Trade news website
- Available in: English
- Owner: Breaking Media
- Founder: David Lat
- Website: abovethelaw.com
- Commercial: Yes
- Launched: 2006; 20 years ago

Above the Law (ATL) is a news website about law and the legal profession, covering the judiciary, law firms, and law schools. A widely read publication in the legal community, the site draws about 1.5 million readers in a normal month. Established in 2006, Above the Law is owned and published by Breaking Media.

== Influence ==
The site has been cited by or referenced in The New York Times, The Wall Street Journal, The Washington Post, GQ, The American Lawyer, Forbes, Washingtonian, and Gawker, among other publications. The Washington Post described Above the Law as "a must-read legal blog." The New York Times, citing the publication's "long history of skewering the nation's most elite [law] firms," reported that "[p]artners running billion-dollar firms have long eyed its morning newsletter like an elephant does a mouse," telling their lawyers, "Don't do anything that could wind up in Above the Law."

In 2007, Above the Law was honored as Best Law Blog in the 2007 Weblog Awards. In 2008, it was listed as one of the ABA Journal's "100 Best Web Sites by Lawyers, for Lawyers." In 2013, it began publishing an annual ranking of law schools.

One factor in the site's popularity is that it is "free for anyone who supplies an email address and basic job information for use by its advertisers, who pay the bills," unlike most other legal trade publications (which tend to be paywalled). Above the Law receives all of its funding through investments and advertising on its website.

== Staff ==
Legal journalist David Lat founded Above the Law in 2006, after previously authoring the legal blog Underneath Their Robes, and served as its managing editor for more than a decade. In 2017, Lat was succeeded as managing editor by Elie Mystal.

In 2020, Mystal left Above the Law to become justice correspondent at The Nation and write books (including two New York Times bestsellers, Allow Me to Retort: A Black Guy's Guide to the Constitution and Bad Law: Ten Popular Laws That Are Ruining America). Technology writer Kashmir Hill, now at The New York Times, also began her journalism career at Above the Law.

The current editors of Above the Law are Staci Zaretsky, Joe Patrice, and Kathryn Rubino, who are joined by a number of columnists from across the legal landscape. The staff work from the top floor of the Cable Building in New York City.

Breaking Media's lead investors include Justin B. Smith, co-founder of Semafor (website), and S. Carter Burden III, son of Carter Burden.

== Controversies ==
In 2011, Above the Law was sued for $50 million for an erroneous story about a rape to which one of its articles linked. The suit was ultimately settled out of court.

In 2016, Above the Law received criticism from many publications when Mystal wrote an article suggesting that jury nullification of crimes by black people against white people could be used by jurors as a form of protest.

In 2020, Above the Law was the subject of a detailed New York Times article by Elizabeth Williamson. She wrote that "since March [2025], when Mr. Trump began targeting for retribution top law firms whose clients and past work he does not like, Above the Law has become a rage read for lawyers incensed at the firms that accommodated him."
