= Roger M. Milgrim =

American lawyer

- Education: University of Pennsylvania, A.B.; NYU School of Law, LL.B., LL.M
- Occupations: Intellectual property lawyer; Author
- Notable work: Milgrim on Trade Secrets; Milgrim on Licensing; Milgrim's Gruide to IP Licensing
- Website: www.rogermilgrim.com

Roger M. Milgrim is an American intellectual property lawyer, and the author of two multivolume law treatises: Milgrim on Trade Secrets and Milgrim on Licensing.

== Early life, family and education ==
Milgrim graduated in 1954 from Central High School in Philadelphia. He earned his Bachelor of Arts degree in 1958 from the University of Pennsylvania, also in Philadelphia. He was a Root-Tilden Scholar and received an LL.B. and later an LL.M. from the New York University School of Law. He also attended the University of Paris School of Law as a Ford Foundation Fellow and a Fulbright Scholar.

For his essay on territoriality of copyright, Milgrim won the National First Prize in the Nathan Burkan competition, awarded by the American Society of Authors, Composers & Publishers (ASCAP).

== Career ==
Milgrim was the first American associate in the Paris office of Baker & McKenzie, then the largest international law firm. He entered practice in New York as an associate in Nixon, Mudge, Rose, Guthrie, Alexander & Mitchell, where as part of his transactional practice he served as a personal attorney to Richard Nixon in connection with publishing agreements. He served as the senior associate in the US Supreme Court case that Mr. Nixon argued, Hill v. Time, Inc., 385 U.S. 374 (1967), which explored the relationship of the First Amendment and the Right of Privacy.

In 1968, Milgrim co-founded the firm of Milgrim Thomajan & Lee. By 1992 it had grown from two to 160 lawyers in five cities (New York, Boston, Austin (Texas), Washington, D.C., and Los Angeles). In 1992 Milgrim and his firm's intellectual property group joined the New York office of the law firm of Paul, Hastings, Janofsky & Walker, a prominent international law firm, where he served as a senior partner and held such positions as the head of the firm's intellectual property group and the firm's litigation department.

In addition to practice, Milgrim taught trade secret and intellectual property law at New York University School of Law for over two decades. He has also lectured at law schools including Columbia, Fordham, Houston, Kansas, Loyola (Chicago), University of Pennsylvania, Stanford, Texas and Yale. He has been a principal speaker before many bar associations, including those of California, Illinois, Michigan, New York and Texas. He was one of four speakers at the Tokyo Press Club where the then new Japanese Unfair Competition Prevention Law was discussed before an audience of Japanese executives and lawyers; the other three speakers were the heads of the Japanese and U.S. patent offices and a professor from the Max Planck Institute (Japanese law is based on the German Civil Code). Milgrim was the first Dean's Distinguished Lecturer at the Annenberg School for Communication of the University of Pennsylvania, which lecture, the following year, was given by Cass Sunstein, professor of law (then at the University of Chicago) and who served as an Advisor to the Obama White House for Information and Regulatory Affairs, advising president Barack Obama. Milgrim has also lectured to numerous legal departments, including AT&T, Eastman Kodak, Exxon, PPG, Procter & Gamble and United Technologies.

In addition to an active transactional and litigation practice, he has acted as a lawyer's lawyer, serving as an expert witness in the field of trade secret and intellectual property licensing practices in over 50 litigations and domestic and international arbitrations, having been retained by a wide variety of law firms including:

- Baker Botts
- Cadwalader, Wickersham & Taft
- Dechert
- Gibson, Dunn
- Hogan & Hartson
- Keker & Van Nest
- Kenyon & Kenyon
- King & Spalding
- Kirkland & Ellis
- Latham & Watkins
- Morrison & Foerster
- Orrick, Herrington & Sutcliffe
- Paul Hastings
- Quinn Emanuel
- Skadden Arps
- Sullivan & Cromwell
- White & Case
- Wilson Sonsini

Milgrim on Trade Secrets was originally published in 1967 and is updated three times each year; its 124th edition, published in 2020, comprises five volumes. Milgrim on Licensing was first published in 1990 and is updated twice annually; its 51st update, published in 2019, comprises four volumes. These two treatises began being updated in 2007 by Milgrim and Eric E. Bensen. Both treatises are companions to other major intellectual property treatises in the LexisNexis IP series, which includes Chisum on Patents and Nimmer on Copyright. The two treatises have been cited by the U.S. Supreme Court and other courts, and the treatise on trade Secrets has been cited by the appellate and/or district courts in virtually every federal circuit and by state courts in virtually every state. In late 2012, Milgrim's Guide to IP Licensing was published by Wolters Kluwer.

== Other activities ==
Milgrim has served on the boards of directors of Technip (a Paris-based NYSE-Euronext major international engineering firm, which is one of the CAC 40 public companies, the French equivalent of the Dow Jones Industrial Average), Coflexip-Stenna, and on the boards of not for profits, such as The Fulbright Association and The Brooklyn Hospital.
