= Michael Gerrard =

American legal scholar

Academic background
- Education: Columbia University (BA); New York University (JD)

Academic work
- Discipline: Environmental law
- Institutions: Columbia University

Michael Burr Gerrard is an American legal scholar. He is the Andrew Sabin Professor of Professional Practice at Columbia Law School.

== Biography ==
Gerrard was born in New York City, where his parents were graduate students at Columbia University, and grew up in Charleston, West Virginia. His father, Nathan L. Gerrard, was a professor of sociology at the University of Charleston, and his mother, Louise B. Gerrard, was the executive director of the West Virginia Council on Aging.

He received his B.A. from Columbia in 1972, followed by a J.D. from the New York University School of Law in 1978 as a Root-Tilden Scholar.

From 1979 to 2008, he was a lawyer at Arnold & Porter and served as the partner in charge of its New York City office. He was known for his environmental practice before departing the partnership to join the faculty of Columbia Law School. His specialty includes environmental law, regulation, and climate change policy.

Gerrard founded and directed the law school's Center for Climate Change Law. He also chaired the faculty of The Earth Institute from 2015 to 2018.

He is the author of Global Climate Change and U.S. Law, co-edited with Harvard Law School professor Jody Freeman.
