= David E. White Jr. =

American attorney and government official

David E. White, Jr.
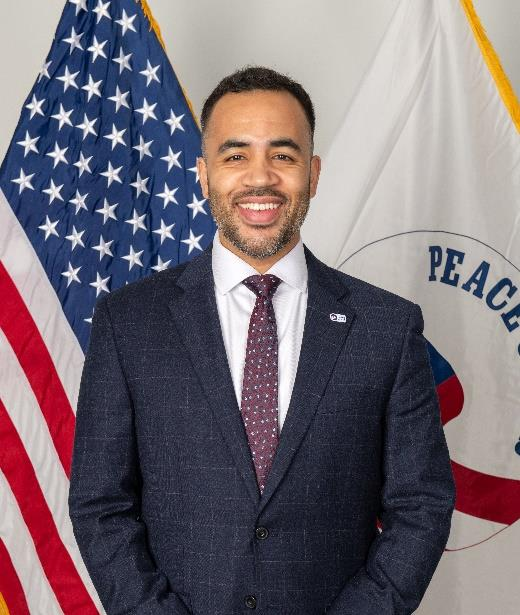

Deputy Director of the Peace Corps
- In office December 29, 2023 – January 20, 2025
- President: Joe Biden

Personal details
- Education: United States Military Academy (BS); Harvard Law School (JD)

Military service
- Allegiance: United States
- Branch/service: United States Army
- Years of service: 2009–2014
- Rank: Captain
- Awards: Bronze Star, Purple Heart, Combat Action Badge

David E. White Jr. is an American government official who served as deputy director of the Peace Corps from 2023 to 2025.

== Early life and education ==
White earned a bachelor of science and army commission from the United States Military Academy in 2009. Subsequently, he served five years as an Army Officer, including a deployment to Afghanistan for Operation Enduring Freedom where he was awarded a Purple Heart, bronze star, and the combat action badge. While recovering from wounds sustained in Afghanistan, he coordinated care for other wounded soldiers and later served on the admissions staff at United States Military Academy. In 2017, he earned a juris doctor, cum laude, from Harvard Law School.

== Career ==
Upon graduation from law school, White clerked for Judge Paul J. Watford of the U.S. Court of Appeals for the Ninth Circuit. Later he joined the New York City law firm Wachtell, Lipton, Rosen & Katz as a transactional attorney.

=== Biden-Harris Administration ===
White joined the Biden-Harris administration as deputy associate counsel in the White House Presidential Personnel Office. After the US withdrawal from Afghanistan, White was assigned to the National Security Council as a senior advisor for Operations Allies Welcome. Next, he served as the special assistant to the president for national security personnel. White later served as a senior advisor at the State Department.

In June 2023, President Joe Biden nominated White to serve as deputy director of the Peace Corps. Hearings on his nomination were held by the United States Senate Committee on Foreign Relations on October 19, 2023, and his nomination was reported favorably by the committee on October 25, 2023. He was unanimously confirmed by the United States Senate on December 20, 2023, and sworn in by Director Carol Spahn on December 29, 2023.
