= Sandy Hook: An American Tragedy =

Nonfiction book by Elizabeth Williamson

- 2022 Hardcover image
- Author: Elizabeth Williamson
- Subject: Sandy Hook Elementary School massacre Conspiracies. Social media. True Crime / Murder / Mass Murder. Conspiracy Theories.
- Genre: nonfiction
- Set in: Newtown, Connecticut; Texas; Washington D.C.
- Published: March 8, 2022
- Publisher: Dutton Publishing
- Publication place: United States
- Media type: Print
- ISBN: 9781524746575 also: 1524746576
- OCLC: 1298898213
- Website: Penguin Random House

Sandy Hook: An American Tragedy and the Battle for Truth is a nonfiction book written by journalist Elizabeth Williamson and published in 2022 by Dutton, an imprint of Penguin Random House.

== Summary ==
In the book, Williamson presents evidence that the universe of counterfactual narratives that have become embedded in our society began with the Sandy Hook Elementary School shooting. Hence, according to the New York Times' book review, "Williamson promises to connect the dots ... from that horrible December [2012] morning in Newtown to that despicable January [2021] afternoon in Washington when Donald Trump's supporters stormed the Capitol, leading to seven lost lives". Williamson additionally says that the proliferation of injurious Sandy Hook fictional truths led to Pizzagate, QAnon, and the 2021 United States Capitol attack.

The book notes publicly documented connections between Alex Jones and Donald Trump. Jones is presented as one of main perpetrators of the Sandy Hook Elementary School shooting conspiracy theories. Two hours after the Sandy Hook massacre, Jones said on air: "My gut is, with the timing and everything that happened, this is staged ... Why do governments stage these things? To get our guns!"

Even before the 2012 massacre, conspiracy theorists promoted misgivings and distrust about previous mass shootings. However, Williamson said that Sandy Hook was the first conspiracy theory that went viral. In her book, Williamson wrote: "The struggle to defend objective truth against people who consciously choose to deny or distort it has become a fight to defend our society, and democracy itself".

== Reception ==
The book was longlisted for the 2023 Andrew Carnegie Medal for Excellence in Nonfiction.
