= Anthony J. Casey =

American legal scholar

- Education: Georgetown University (BA); University of Chicago (JD)
- Employer: University of Chicago Law School
- Known for: Business law, finance law, and bankruptcy law

Anthony J. Casey is an American legal scholar who is currently the Donald M. Ephraim Professor of Law and Economics at the University of Chicago Law School. He is an expert on business law and bankruptcy law. In 2020, Casey was appointed as deputy dean of the law school.

== Life and career ==
Casey graduated from Georgetown University with a Bachelor of Arts, magna cum laude, in 1999, majoring in economics and political theory. He was a member of Phi Beta Kappa. In 2002, he graduated with a J.D. magna cum laude from the University of Chicago Law School, where he won the John M. Olin Prize for the Outstanding Student in Law and Economics and was a member of the Order of the Coif and the University of Chicago Law Review.

After graduating from law school, Casey clerked for Judge Joel Flaum on the U.S. Court of Appeals for the Seventh Circuit. Between 2004 and 2006, he worked at Wachtell, Lipton, Rosen & Katz before moving to Kirkland & Ellis in Chicago, where he made partner in 2008.

Casey joined the faculty at the University of Chicago Law School as a Bigelow Fellow and Lecturer in Law in 2009. In 2016, he was appointed a professor of law. His research focuses on the intersection of finance and law, and he has co-written a casebook on bankruptcy law. Casey teaches courses and seminars in corporate governance, business law, bankruptcy and reorganization, finance, litigation strategy, civil procedure, and law and technology. In 2020, he was a visiting professor at Harvard Law School.
