= Jeohn Favors =

American attorney and government official

Jeohn Salone Favors
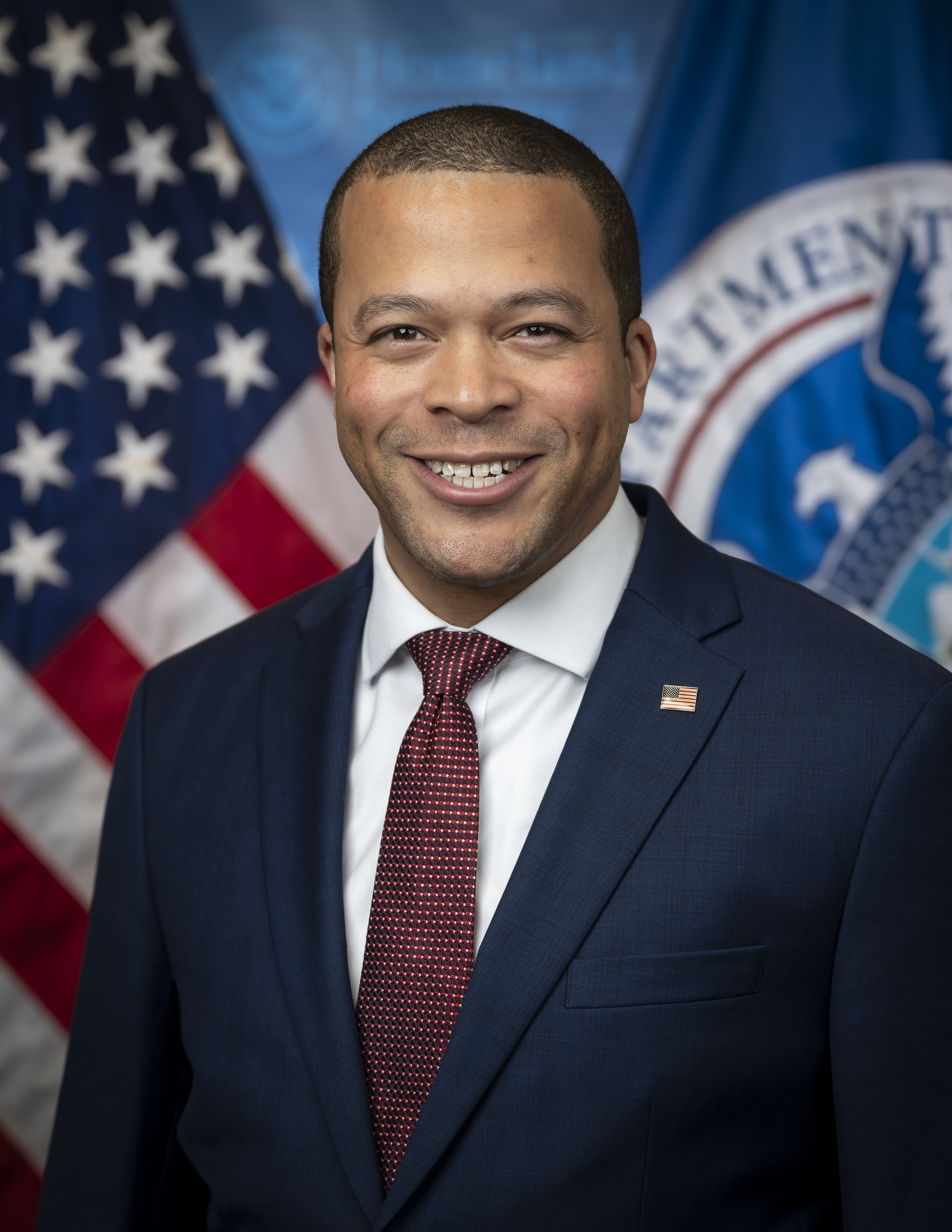

Assistant Secretary of Homeland Security for Counterterrorism, Threat Prevention, and Law Enforcement Policy
- In office January 2024 – January 2025
- President: Joe Biden
- Preceded by: Samantha Vinograd

Personal details
- Education: Yale University (BA); Harvard Law School (JD)

Jeohn Salone Favors is an American attorney and former government official who served as the Assistant Secretary for Counterterrorism, Threat Prevention, and Law Enforcement Policy at the Department of Homeland Security in the Biden administration.

== Early life and education ==
Favors is a native of rural South Louisiana. He worked as a volunteer Firefighter-EMT in his hometown of Franklin, Louisiana. Favors responded to New Orleans in the immediate aftermath of Hurricane Katrina and helped rescue and evacuate hundreds from catastrophic flooding.

Favors graduated from Yale University with a bachelor of arts in political science. He received a J.D. from Harvard Law School, where he served as Class Marshal.

== Career ==
Favors served domestically and internationally as a diplomat with the U.S. Department of State, as an operations officer with the Central Intelligence Agency’s Clandestine Service, and as a National Security Council staff member at the White House. While at Harvard Law School, Favors was a student attorney and public defender in Massachusetts state courts, and served as a member of the trial team that defended and won the acquittal of former New England Patriots professional football player Aaron Hernandez in a jury trial for double murder.

After law school, Favors practiced at the New York City law firm Wachtell, Lipton, Rosen & Katz.

=== Biden-Harris Administration ===
In November 2020, Favors was named a member of the Biden-Harris Transition Team and served on the Agency Review Teams for the National Security Council and Intelligence Community. Favors later served as Senior Counsel to the Assistant Attorney General for the National Security Division at the U.S. Department of Justice. In January 2024, he was appointed as the Assistant Secretary of Homeland Security for Counterterrorism, Threat Prevention, and Law Enforcement Policy.

Favors was selected as a member of the French-American Foundation's Young Leader 2025 cohort.
