= David Lat =

American lawyer and legal blogger (born 1975)

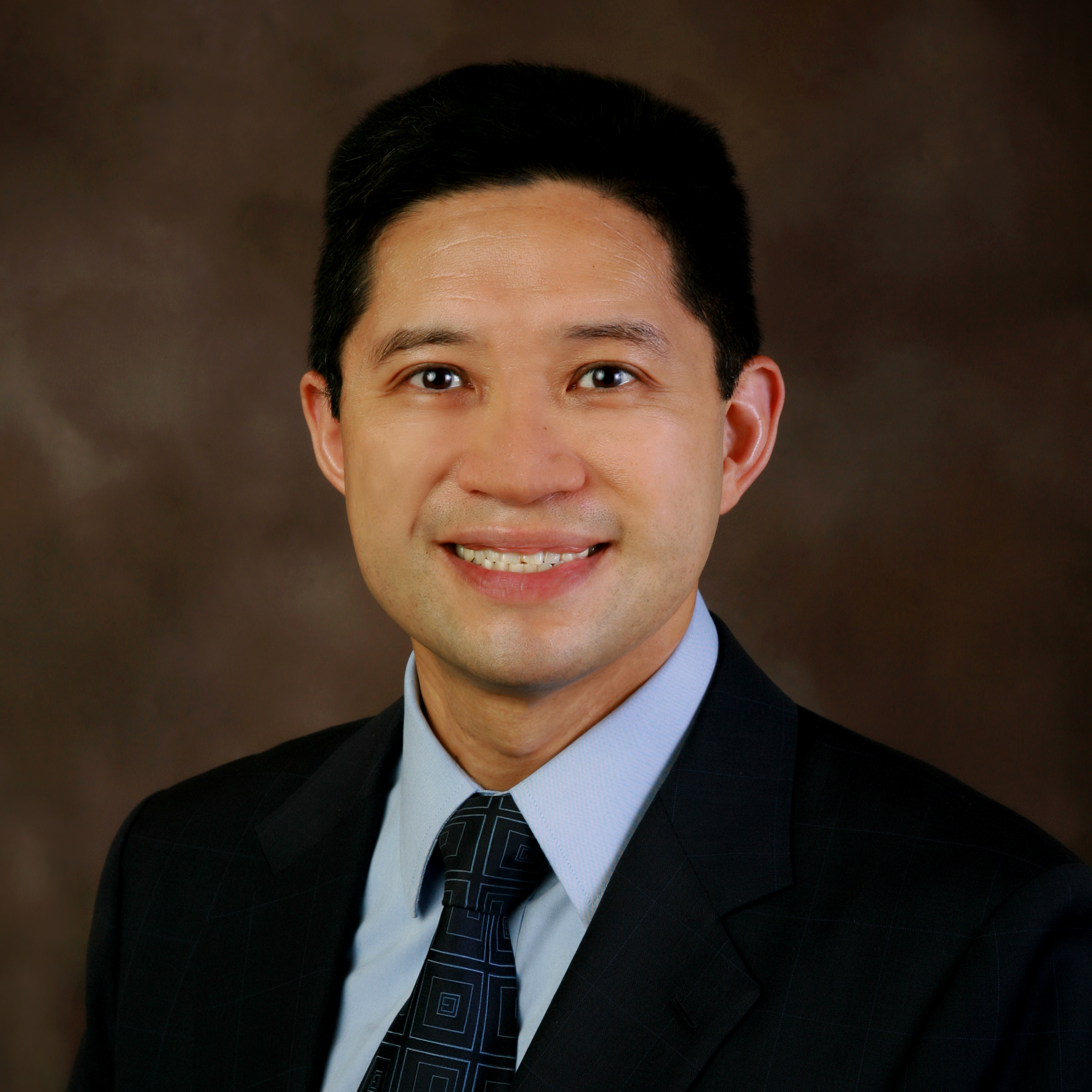
- Lat in 2022
- Born: David Benjamin Lat; June 19, 1975 (age 51); New York City, U.S.
- Education: Harvard University (BA); Yale University (JD)
- Occupations: Lawyer; author; legal commentator
- Spouse: Zachary Baron Shemtob
- Children: 2
- Website: Original Jurisdiction

David Benjamin Lat (born June 19, 1975) is an American lawyer, author, and legal commentator. In 2006, Lat founded Above the Law, a website about law firms and the legal profession. In 2019, he left Above the Law, which is now owned by Breaking Media, a network of business-to-business media brands.

As of 2026, Lat publishes Original Jurisdiction, a newsletter on the Substack platform, and hosts its companion podcast of the same name. He also writes a column for Bloomberg Law, which launched in 2023.

Lat attended Harvard University and Yale Law School. After law school, he worked as a law clerk for Judge Diarmuid O'Scannlain, became an associate at Wachtell, Lipton, Rosen & Katz, and later was an assistant U.S. attorney for the appeals division in the District of New Jersey.

Lat first began blogging anonymously for the judicial gossip blog "Underneath Their Robes", until he revealed his identity in a November 2005 interview with Jeffrey Toobin of The New Yorker. In 2006, Lat launched Above the Law, a website featuring news, gossip, and commentary about law and the legal profession (including law firms, law schools, and the courts). In December 2014, Lat's debut novel, Supreme Ambitions, was published.

== Early life and education ==
Lat was born on June 19, 1975, in Queens, New York. His parents were physicians who had immigrated to the United States from the Philippines. He grew up in Bergenfield, New Jersey, and Saddle River, New Jersey. While living in Saddle River, his neighbors included former President Richard Nixon. On Halloween, he would get a Halloween card and a handshake from the former president. Lat attended Regis High School in Manhattan, New York, where he participated in speech and debate and excelled in the category of extemporaneous speaking. He won the 1992 New York State Championship and several national tournaments, including the 1990 Wake Forest National Early Bird, the 1991 Villiger Tournament, the 1992 Barkley Forum, the 1992 Harvard Tournament, and, ultimately, the 1992 NCFL Grand National Championship.

After high school, Lat attended Harvard University, where he studied English literature, wrote dozens of columns for The Harvard Crimson, and was a member of the Harvard Speech and Parliamentary Debate Society. He graduated in 1996 with a Bachelor of Arts, magna cum laude, and was elected to Phi Beta Kappa. He then attended Yale Law School, where he was an editor of the Yale Law Journal and vice president of its Federalist Society chapter. He graduated in 1999 with a Juris Doctor.

== Legal career ==
After law school, Lat was a law clerk for judge Diarmuid O'Scannlain of the U.S. Court of Appeals for the Ninth Circuit from 1999 to 2000. He interviewed for a Supreme Court clerkship with justice Antonin Scalia, but was not offered a clerkship. He then entered private practice at the Manhattan law firm Wachtell, Lipton, Rosen & Katz. While at Wachtell, he worked on a fight over insurance payments for the World Trade Center on behalf of Wachtell's client Larry Silverstein. One Wachtell partner noted that he seemed very unhappy in the drudgery of litigation.

After leaving Wachtell, Lat took a job in the appeals division of the United States Attorney for the District of New Jersey, and twice argued before Justice Samuel Alito in the Court of Appeals for the Third Circuit. When his blogging became public, he met with then-U.S. Attorney Chris Christie, who praised his blog. At the end of 2005, Lat left his job at the U.S. Attorney's office. He reported that the resignation was his own choice, though his supervisor encouraged him to take any blogging opportunities afforded by his new celebrity.

== Blogging ==
=== Underneath Their Robes ===
In June 2004, Lat anonymously started the website Underneath Their Robes (UTR), a gossip blog about the federal judiciary, under the pseudonym Article III Groupie, also known as A3G. (Note: The pseudonym references Article Three of the United States Constitution, which establishes the federal judiciary.) While Lat mentioned his background as a former federal judicial clerk from a top law school, he gave the readers the impression that the author was a female lawyer at a large law firm. The blog became widely popular when it conducted a poll on the "Superhotties of the Federal Judiciary", and several federal judges, including Alex Kozinski and Richard Posner, corresponded with Article III Groupie. The blog interviewed several judges and gained national media coverage in the wake of the 2005 United States Supreme Court nominations of John Roberts, Harriet Miers, and Samuel Alito. The blog also served as a clearinghouse for news and gossip about clerks for the Supreme Court, whom A3G called "the Elect."

In November 2005, Lat revealed A3G's identity in an interview with Jeffrey Toobin for the magazine The New Yorker. Lat said that "[t]he blog really reflects two aspects of my personality, I am very interested in serious legal issues as well as in fun and frivolous and gossipy issues. I can go from the Harvard Law Review to Us Weekly very quickly." After leaving the U.S. Attorney's office in January 2006, Lat became an editor of Washington, D.C., blog Wonkette (at the time, part of the Gawker Media network), formerly run by Ana Marie Cox. (Note: Lat no longer actively posts on UTR, but the archives are available online.)

=== Above the Law ===
In June 2006, Lat announced his decision to leave Wonkette in order to form a legal gossip blog with Dealbreaker's Elizabeth Spiers. In August 2006, this blog was founded as 'Above the Law'. In July 2008, he became the managing editor of Breaking Media, overseeing its stable of blogs out of its New York office. In December 2009, Lat announced that he would be returning to full-time writing and editing of Above the Law, after a new CEO and executive editor joined Breaking Media.

In 2012 Lat "broke the news that one of most prestigious law firms in the world, Dewey & LeBoeuf, which employed more than 1,300 attorneys in 12 countries in 2007, was on the verge of imploding." Business Insider named Lat one of the 20 biggest legal stars on Twitter, calling his Twitter feed a "treasure trove of law firm gossip, employment trends, stupid law student antics, and pretty much anything else concerning the legal industry."

In May 2019, Lat left Above the Law to become a managing director of the legal recruiting firm Lateral Link.

=== Original Jurisdiction ===
In December 2020, Lat launched Original Jurisdiction, an online newsletter about law and the legal profession, with an interview of prominent litigator David Boies as his first story. In May 2021, Lat left Lateral Link and legal recruiting and returned to full-time writing, with Original Jurisdiction as his primary outlet. Paid subscriptions and sponsorships at Original Jurisdiction now represent his primary source of income. Since September 2022, Lat has hosted a companion podcast to his newsletter, also called Original Jurisdiction.

== Author and writing ==
Lat's writing has also appeared in various newspapers and magazines, including The New York Times, The Wall Street Journal, The Washington Post, The Los Angeles Times, The Boston Globe, The Atlantic, Slate, New York Magazine, The New York Observer, and Washingtonian.

In 2014, Lat's debut novel, Supreme Ambitions, was favorably reviewed on release. It was the first work of fiction published by Ankerwycke, then a newly launched trade imprint of the American Bar Association. The novel details the rise of Audrey Coyne, a recent Yale Law School graduate who dreams of clerking for the U.S. Supreme Court, mirroring Lat's own former ambitions. After graduating from YLS, Audrey moves to the West Coast to clerk for a highly regarded appeals-court judge. According to a reviewer in The New York Times, "for an elite niche — consisting largely of federal judges and their clerks — Supreme Ambitions has become the most buzzed-about novel of the year."

== Personal life ==
Lat is gay. He is married to fellow lawyer Zachary Baron Shemtob. They have two sons born via gestational surrogacy.

On March 17, 2020, Lat announced on Twitter that he was infected with COVID-19, then proceeded to live-tweet his sickness, hospitalization, and recovery. According to The New York Times, "Mr. Lat’s struggle gripped much of the city, as he and his loved ones updated his condition on Twitter in the early days of the coronavirus, when knowledge was scant but panic was widespread."

Lat was listed in critical condition and intubated in a hospital in New York City as of March 20, but his condition improved substantially by March 28. He was discharged from NYU Langone on April 1.

After his hospitalization, Lat was interviewed on the Today show, The Rachel Maddow Show, and Nightline about his experience. He also wrote about it for publications including The Washington Post, Los Angeles Times, and Slate.
