= Samantha Vinograd =

American foreign policy commentator (born 1983)

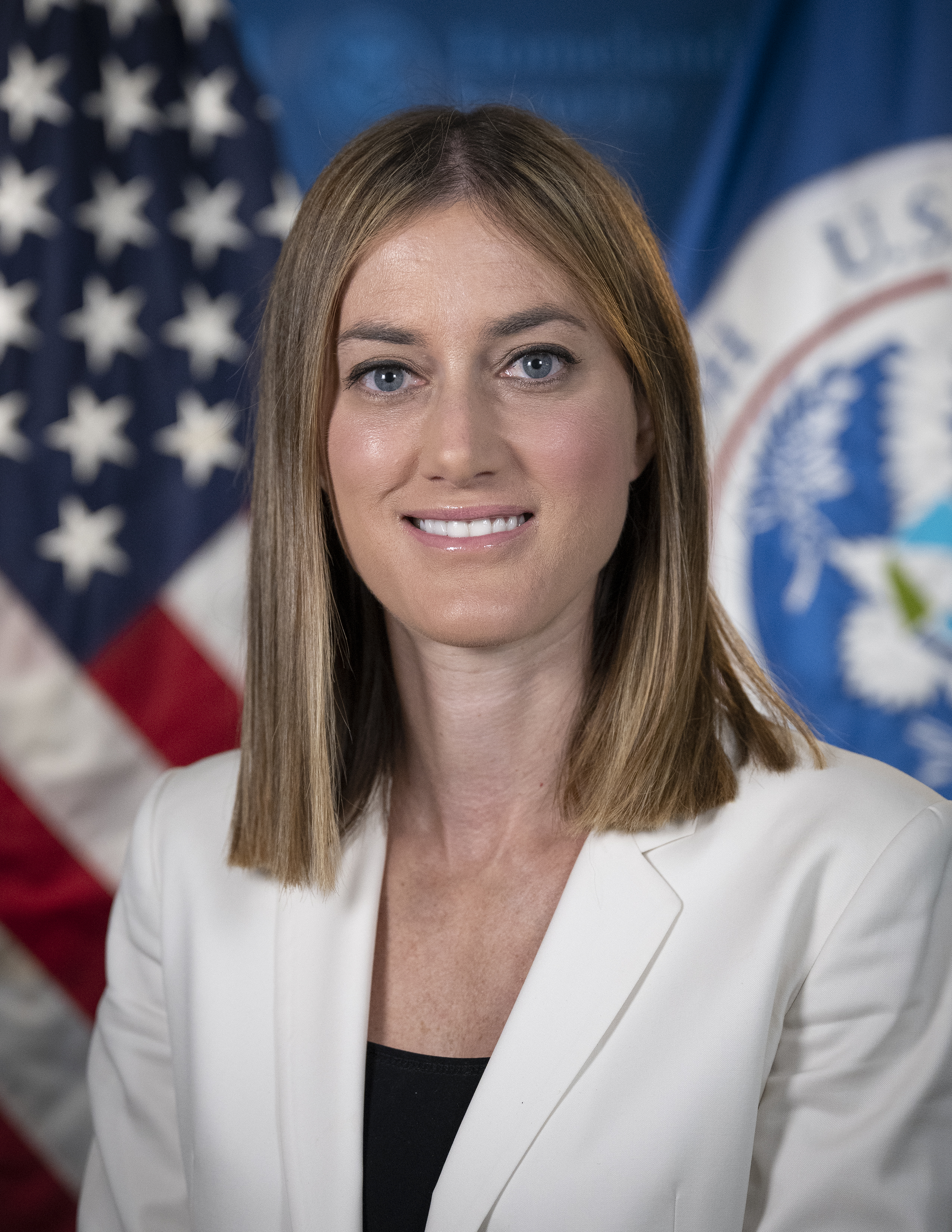
- Vinograd in 2021

Assistant Secretary of Homeland Security for Counterterrorism, Threat Prevention, and Law Enforcement Policy
- In office August 2022 – December 2023; Acting: July 2021 – August 2022
- President: Joe Biden
- Preceded by: John D. Cohen
- Succeeded by: Jeohn Favors

Personal details
- Born: Samantha Erin Vinograd; February 17, 1983 (age 43) Connecticut, U.S.
- Education: University of Pennsylvania (BA); Georgetown University (MA)
- Occupation: Government official
- Known for: National Security Analyst at CNN

Samantha Erin Vinograd (born February 17, 1983) is a former American government official and presently a foreign policy commentator. She served as the Assistant Secretary for Counterterrorism, Threat Prevention, and Law Enforcement Policy at the Department of Homeland Security from July 2021 to December 2023.

== Early life and education ==
Vinograd was born and raised in Connecticut in a Jewish family, including her father who is a Holocaust survivor from France. Vinograd graduated from the Hopkins School in New Haven, Connecticut, in 2001.

After high school, Vinograd attended the University of Pennsylvania and graduated in 2005 with a Bachelor of Arts degree in Asian and Middle Eastern studies. She later received a Master of Arts in security studies from Georgetown University.

== Career ==
After her studies, Vinograd joined the U.S. Department of the Treasury, working as deputy attaché to Iraq and as an International Economist during the George W. Bush administration.

In August 2009, during the Obama administration, she began her tenure at the National Security Council, where she served as director for Iraq, director for international economics, and as senior advisor to National Security Advisor Thomas E. Donilon.

In 2013, she began to work for Goldman Sachs focusing on public-private sector partnerships. She later worked at Stripe, leading global public policy before joining CNN as a national security analyst. For several years, Vinograd was also a Senior Advisor at the Biden Institute at the University of Delaware.

She has worked as an advisor to the US Fund for UNICEF, was named a David E. Rockefeller Fellow at the Trilateral Commission, a Millennium Fellow at the Atlantic Council, and serves on the board of the Women's Foreign Policy Group. She co-founded Global Opportunity Advisors, a geopolitical risk and policy advisory firm, with Morgan Ortagus.

=== Biden Administration ===
Vinograd began serving in the Biden administration as senior counselor for national security and acting assistant secretary for counterterrorism and threat prevention at the Department of Homeland Security in February 2021. She was promoted to assistant secretary for counterterrorism and threat prevention in July 2021.

Vinograd left DHS in December 2023 and joined the Brunswick Group. In September 2025, she was named Distinguished Visiting Fellow with the World Perry House at the University of Pennsylvania.
