= Wachtell, Lipton, Rosen & Katz =

American law firm

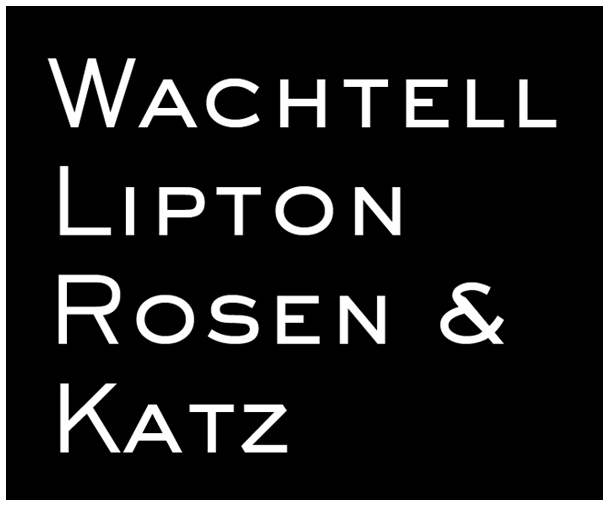
- Headquarters: CBS Building; New York City, U.S.
- No. of offices: 1
- No. of attorneys: 272
- Major practice areas: General practice
- Revenue: US$1.39 billion (2025)
- Profit per equity partner: US$12.15 million (2025)
- Date founded: 1965; 61 years ago
- Founders: Herbert Wachtell; Jerry Kern
- Company type: General partnership
- Website: www.wlrk.com

Wachtell, Lipton, Rosen & Katz (known as Wachtell; WOK-TEL) is an American white-shoe law firm in New York City. Wachtell operates from a single Manhattan office and is one of the smallest firms in the AmLaw 100.

== History ==
The firm was founded in 1965 by Herbert Wachtell and Jerry Kern, who were joined shortly after by Martin Lipton, Leonard Rosen, and George Katz. The four named partners met at New York University School of Law where they were editors on the New York University Law Review. The firm rose to prominence on Wall Street during an era when brokers and investment bankers frequently launched small firms, but received little attention from established white-shoe law firms.

Martin Lipton, a founding partner in the firm, invented the so-called "poison pill defense" during the 1980s, a shareholders' rights plan designed to foil hostile takeovers. Acting for both sides of mergers and acquisitions, Wachtell Lipton has represented public companies, including AT&T, Pfizer, and JP Morgan Chase.

William Savitt and Andrew Nussbaum were appointed co-chairs in November 2023, succeeding Ed Herlihy and Daniel Neff in the roles, who had led the firm since 2006.

That same month, following the onset of the 2023 Israel–Hamas war, amid clashes at some college campuses, including at some U.S. law schools; Wachtell was among more than two dozen law firms that submitted a letter to 14 American law school deans denouncing antisemitism and advising those mentoring future law graduates of entrenched workplace policies against harassment or discrimination at their firms. Previously, the firm was also among 17 global law firm signatories to a public statement denouncing growing antisemitic attacks in the U.S. that was published in The American Lawyer in May 2021.

The firm's partnership was notably reduced by eight percent in 2025.

In April 2026, USA v. Fejal, et al revealed insider trading involving several law firms that had been orchestrated over decades by a network of 30 lawyers indicted co-conspirators, mainly lawyers who are former Yale classmates, which included the participation of a former Wachtell attorney who was an associate at the firm during 2013 to 2022. The indictment was released in May, in which prosecutors characterized affected law firms as victims of those charged.

== Notable cases ==
Notable clients and cases have included Chrysler in the 1970s; the acquisition of Getty Oil by Texaco, during the mid-1980s; Philip Morris in the 1990s, and negotiation of the master development agreement for the World Trade Center after the September 11, 2001 attacks.

In the midst of the 2008 financial crisis, 17 of the firm’s lawyers advised the United States Treasury Department in the bailout of Freddie Mac and Fannie Mae.

The firm has represented clients in precedent-setting Delaware corporate governance cases in which the "poison pill" defense was upheld, including, in 1985, Moran v. Household International, Inc., with the court deeming Household International's defense as a "legitimate exercise of business judgment"; Paramount Communications, Inc. v. Time Inc., in 1989; and, in 2011, Air Products and Chemicals Inc. v. Airgas, Inc., with a judge upholding its shareholder rights plan as defense against a hostile takeover of Airgas.

During the 2020s, the firm represented Capital One, in its $35.3 billion acquisition of Discover Financial, and OpenAI in the largest private tech fund-raising round in history.

In 2022, the firm was hired by Twitter to oversee Elon Musk’s acquisition of the social media platform after Musk attempted to withdraw from the deal.

Throughout 2024 and 2025, the firm was involved in the acquisition of US Steel by Nippon Steel.

In 2025, the firm joined the processes overseeing the merger between Union Pacific Railroad and Norfolk Southern Railway, which has the potential to become the largest deal in the history of the railroad industry.

In 2026, the firm was hired by Nvidia to investigate the affair between its chief executive Jensen Huang and an alleged Chinese spy.

== Rankings ==
As of 2025, The American Lawyer's 2025 Am Law 100 ranks Wachtell first among all U.S. firms in profits per lawyer at US$4.5 million and profits per equity partner just over US$9 million. In Vault's 2026 law firm rankings, Wachtell was ranked #1 as the most selective law firm in the world and is consistently ranked as one of the most prestigious.

== Notable alumni ==
- Laura Arnold, associate - philanthropist
- William T. Allen, of counsel — former Chancellor of the Delaware Court of Chancery; New York University School of Law professor
- Anthony J. Casey, associate — University of Chicago Law School professor
- James Cole, partner — Acting Deputy Secretary of Education
- Allison Christians, associate — H. Heward Stikeman chair in Taxation, McGill University Faculty of Law
- George T. Conway III, associate and partner — lawyer for Paula Jones in sexual harassment lawsuit against President Bill Clinton; founder of The Lincoln Project
- Chris Deluzio, associate – U.S. Representative
- Miguel Estrada — attorney and former judicial nominee
- Jeohn Favors, associate – former assistant secretary, Department of Homeland Security
- Margaret Garnett, - associate, judge United States Southern District of New York
- Glenn Greenwald, associate — political activist, journalist, and Pulitzer Prize recipient
- Maura R. Grossman, of counsel — research professor and former director of Women in Computer Science at the University of Waterloo; electronic discovery attorney
- Elizabeth Holtzman, associate — former U.S. Representative and Brooklyn District Attorney
- Robert J. Jackson Jr., associate — Commissioner of the U.S. Securities and Exchange Commission
- Noorain Khan, associate - non-profit executive
- David Lat, associate — blogger, Underneath Their Robes and Above the Law
- Kenneth K. Lee, associate — judge, United States Court of Appeals for the Ninth Circuit
- Matt Levine, associate — attorney, investment banker, and writer
- Julia Mahoney, associate — University of Virginia School of Law professor
- Robert Morgenthau, of counsel — former New York County District Attorney
- Bernard Nussbaum, partner — former White House Counsel to President Bill Clinton
- George Postolos, associate — former president and CEO of Houston Rockets
- Samuel Rascoff, associate — New York University School of Law professor
- Jed Rubenfeld, associate — Yale Law School professor
- Andrew Schlafly, associate — founder of Conservapedia, General Counsel for Association of American Physicians and Surgeons
- Richard J. Sullivan, associate — judge, United States Court of Appeals for the Second Circuit
- Leo E. Strine Jr., of counsel – former Chief Justice of the Delaware Supreme Court, Chancellor of the Delaware Court of Chancery; University of Pennsylvania Law School professor
- David E. White Jr., associate – non-profit executive
- Sheena Wright, associate – former CEO of United Way of New York City, Deputy Mayor of New York City under Eric Adams

== See also ==
- List of largest United States–based law firms by profits per partner
