= Elizabeth Williamson (journalist) =

American journalist

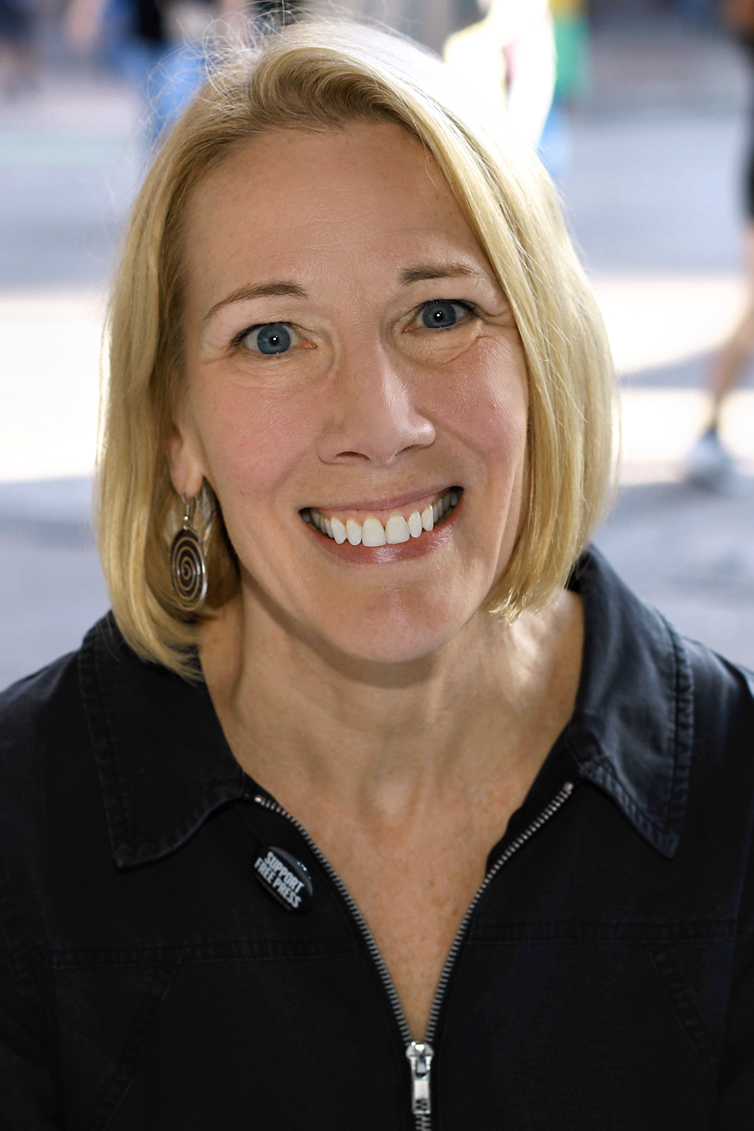
Williamson at the 2022 Texas Book Festival.

Elizabeth Williamson is an American journalist. She is a feature writer at The New York Times and a reporter for The Wall Street Journal.

== Life ==
She was born in Chicago. She graduated from Marquette University.

Her work appeared in The Atlantic. Rolling Stone, and Slate.

== Works ==
- Sandy Hook: An American Tragedy and the Battle for Truth, Dutton, 2022.
