= Martin Lipton =

American lawyer (born 1931)

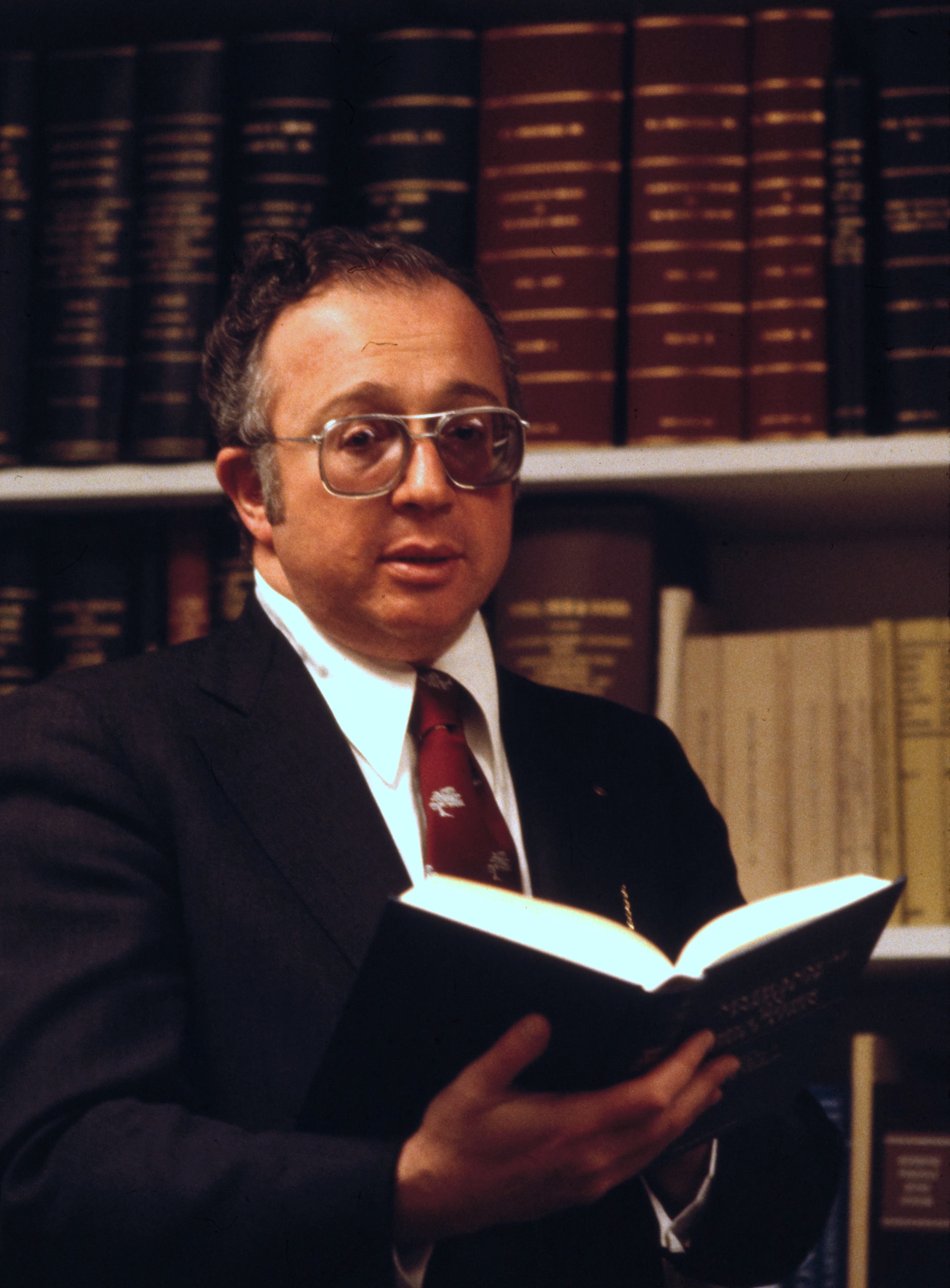
- Lipton defending McGraw Hill from a hostile takeover in 1979
- Born: June 22, 1931 (age 95); Jersey City, New Jersey, U.S.
- Education: University of Pennsylvania (BS); New York University (LLB)
- Occupation: Lawyer
- Spouse: Susan Lytle (m. 1982)

Martin Lipton (born June 22, 1931) is an American lawyer, a founding partner of the law firm of Wachtell, Lipton, Rosen & Katz specializing in and advising on mergers and acquisitions and matters affecting corporate policy and strategy. From 1958–1978 he taught courses on Federal Regulation of Securities and Corporation Law as a lecturer and adjunct professor of law at New York University School of Law.

== Early years ==
Martin Lipton was born June 22, 1931, in Jersey City, New Jersey, to a family of Jewish background. He graduated from Jersey Preparatory School in 1948. Lipton received a B.S. in economics from the Wharton School of the University of Pennsylvania, originally planning on becoming an investment banker. However, he eventually enrolled at New York University School of Law, where he was Editor-in-Chief of the New York University Law Review (1954–1955) and earned a LL.B. in 1955. He also did further study under Adolf A. Berle at Columbia Law School.

In 1956, Lipton clerked for Edward Weinfeld at the United States District Court for the Southern District of New York. In the fall of 1958 he practiced law at Seligson, Morris & Neuburger, a ten-lawyer firm of Charles Seligson and J. Lincoln Morris, where he teamed with Leonard Rosen and George Katz, fellow NYU Law graduates. Shortly thereafter Lipton began a 20-year period as a lecturer and adjunct professor teaching corporate law and securities regulation at NYU School of Law. While at NYU Law School, Lipton joined Rosen and Katz, as well as Herbert Wachtell, to form Wachtell, Lipton, Rosen & Katz in 1965. By the early 1980s Lipton was among the dominant figures with rival lawyer Joseph Flom in mergers and acquisitions. Clients hired Lipton because Flom was on the other side, and vice versa. (Flom and Lipton were friends who lunched together once a week.)

== Later career ==
Lipton works as a partner of Wachtell Lipton representing and advising with respect to many of the largest merger transactions, change-of-control contests and boardroom crises of the past 40 years. The firm was founded as a handshake among four friends and to this day does not have a written partnership agreement. The current 84 partners share equally on a seniority basis. Concurrently he has served as adjunct professor, alumni leader, trustee from 1972 to now and chairman of the board of trustees from 1988 to 1998 of NYU School of Law and from 1976 to now as trustee of NYU and chairman of the board of trustees from 1998 to now. In October 2015, Lipton retired as chairman when his term ended.

In 1975, Lipton represented New York City in several financial transactions, including a temporary $2.5 billion U.S. Government loan, the rollover of the then short-term City debt held by banks and the placement of $500 million of City bonds with City pension funds, that resolved the two-year financial crisis and saved the City from bankruptcy. Also, in 1975, as a trustee of the NYU School of Law, Lipton played a major role in saving NYU from its financial crisis by selling the Mueller Macaroni Company.

In 1979, Lipton was asked to take a leave of absence from Wachtell Lipton and voluntarily serve as special counsel to the Energy Department, and then in 1980 to serve as the acting first general counsel of the Synthetic Fuels Corporation.

In 1988, Lipton was elected chair of the NYU School of Law board of trustees. Also in 1998, Lipton was elected chair of the NYU board of trustees and for the following two decades he worked first with President L. Jay Oliva and then starting in 2002 with John Sexton, who Lipton had appointed NYU president, to complete the work of making NYU the first global network university, with major campuses in Abu Dhabi, Shanghai and Florence and schools in ten other cities, with at least one on every continent. In addition in 2013 NYU completed the merger of Polytechnic University to create the NYU Polytechnic School of Engineering.

== Selected works ==
In 1976, Lipton authored a treatise for the American Bar Association, National Institute on Corporate Takeovers, later published as Corporate Takeovers: Tender Offers and Freezeouts, in 1978.

In 1979, Lipton authored "Takeover Bids in the Target's Boardroom", the seminal article advocating the right of a board of directors to take into account the interests of all the constituencies of the corporation, a position adopted by the Delaware Supreme Court in 1985, and in more than thirty other states by statute or judicial decision and in the Companies Act 2006 of Great Britain.

In 1982, Lipton created the Shareholder rights plan or poison pill, which has been described by Ronald Gilson of the Columbia and Stanford Law Schools as "the most important innovation in corporate law since Samuel Calvin Tate Dodd invented the trust for John D. Rockefeller and Standard Oil in 1879." In 1992 Lipton served on the Subcouncil on Corporate Governance and Financial Markets of the United States Competitiveness Policy Council which resulted in his co-authoring with his fellow member of the Subcouncil, Jay Lorsch of Harvard Business School, an article "A Modest Proposal for Improved Corporate Governance", which became the template for much of the basic corporate governance principles that were adopted in the 1990s.

In 2007, he authored The Many Myths of Lucian Bebchuk, published in the Virginia Law Review.

== Boards, memberships and awards ==
Lipton has served as chairman of Prep for Prep, chairman of the Jerusalem Foundation, chairman of the Lawyers Division of UJA-Federation, trustee of Temple Emanu-El of New York, member of the council of the American Law Institute, director of the Institute of Judicial Administration, trustee of the University of Pennsylvania, member of the International Advisory Council of the Guanghua School of Management of Peking University and member of the Corporate Governance Committee of the U.S. Commission on Competitiveness. Lipton served as special counsel to the Ethics Commission of the International Olympic Committee in connection with the Utah Winter Olympics, and co-chair, with former N.Y. Chief Judge Judith Kaye, of the N.Y. Chief Judge's Task Force on Commercial Litigation in the 21st Century.

Lipton has received honors from organizations, including the Wharton School, New York University School of Law, New York University, the Legal Aid Society, and the NYU Langone Medical Center. Since 1985 Lipton has been on each list of the National Law Journal of the 100 Most Influential Lawyers in America.

Lipton served as counsel to the New York Stock Exchange Committee on Market Structure, Governance and Ownership (1999–2000), as counsel to, and member of, its Committee on Corporate Accountability and Listing Standards Corporate Governance (2002) and as chairman of its Legal Advisory Committee (2002–2004). Lipton is a member of the executive committee of the Partnership for New York City and served as its co-chair (2004–2006).

He is a member of American Academy of Arts & Sciences and a Chevalier de la Légion d'Honneur. Lipton served on the Board of Trustees at New York University Stern School of Business from 2015 to at least 2023.
