= Evan Chesler =

American lawyer

Evan R. Chesler
- Born: 1949 (age 76–77); The Bronx, New York
- Education: New York University (A.B.); Hunter College (M.A.); New York University School of Law (J.D.)
- Occupations: Lawyer; adjunct professor, NYU School of Law
- Known for: Top US litigator
- Website: www.cravath.com/echesler/

Evan Robert Chesler is an American lawyer and retired partner at Cravath, Swaine & Moore. He was the first person in the history of the firm to hold the title of chairman. Chesler now serves as chair of New York University's board of trustees.

== Education and career ==
Chesler received an A.B. degree from New York University with highest honors in history in 1970, then, in 1973, received an M.A. from Hunter College in Russian area studies. In 1975, he earned a J.D. cum laude from New York University School of Law, where he was elected to the Order of the Coif. He was Topics editor of the New York University Law Review; a junior fellow at the Center for International Studies, where he co-authored two published articles on aspects of international law, and was twice a recipient of the John Norton Pomeroy Prize for academic excellence, as well as the Benjamin Butler Prize. Following graduation, he became a law clerk to Inzer B. Wyatt of the U.S. District Court for the Southern District of New York.

He joined Cravath in 1976 as a litigation associate, was elected partner in 1982, then became head of the litigation department in 1996. In November 2005, he was elected as deputy presiding partner, and on January 1, 2007, became the firm's 14th presiding partner, holding that position through 2012. On January 1, 2013, he became the firm's inaugural chairman, a position he held through 2021.

In February 2018, Chesler argued for the first time before the Supreme Court of the United States on behalf of American Express in Ohio v. American Express Co., a case with “high stakes for AmEx’s business model” and “broader ramifications for other companies that have multisided business platforms, especially in the tech sector”, according to The Wall Street Journal. On June 25, the court ruled in favor of American Express.

Chesler is a fellow of the American College of Trial Lawyers, the International Academy of Trial Lawyers, the American Bar Foundation, and the New York Bar Foundation. He is the president of the Institute of Judicial Administration, and was chairman of the board of trustees of the New York Public Library. Chesler is also an adjunct professor of law at his alma mater, New York University School of Law, and has been an adjunct faculty member at the NYU College of Arts and Science.

Chesler has received many accolades during his career, including, in March 2020, the Federal Bar Council’s Whitney North Seymour Award, and a “Litigator of the Year” award from The American Lawyer, in 2019. He has also received a "Lifetime Achievement Award" from the New York Law Journal.
