= NYU Local =

News blog run by NYU students

- Categories: Blog
- Format: Online
- Publisher: Students at New York University
- Total circulation: 200,000
- Founder: Cody Brown, Lily Quateman
- Founded: 2008
- Country: United States
- Based in: New York University
- Language: English
- Website: nyulocal.com

NYU Local is an independent news blog run by New York University (NYU) students. It is the companion publication for NYU along with the Washington Square News, and the undergraduate equivalent of Washington Square Review.

Founded in 2008 to cover discussion and NYU news, NYULocal.com receives, on average, 200,000 unique visitors each month. NYU Local publishes around 10 posts a day Monday through Friday. The blog is run by NYU undergraduates and is editorially independent from New York University. In 2008 NYU Local was profiled by PBS.

Since 2008, alumni of the blog have gone on to work at various prestigious media and journalism companies such as NY1, CNN, The Atlantic, New York Magazine, BuzzFeed, ThinkProgress, MSNBC, Time, Newsweek, and The New York Times.

== History ==
NYU Local was founded by Cody Brown and Lily Quateman in 2008.

NYU Local made news in 2009 when it embedded a live blogger into the Take Back NYU! Student Protest. The protest coverage, which spanned for three days, received links from prominent news websites. Gawker cited NYU Local as the "Definitive Food Court Occupatory Journalism source." New York Magazine, said NYU Local has done, "an excellent (and really, grueling) job of covering the student protest circus over at NYU.".

NYU Local has since made headlines with its coverage of the Palestinian refugee crisis, the university's dealings with pay inequity, and its role in hosting various conferences for journalists and youth.
