= Mark Leslie (entrepreneur) =

American billionaire entrepreneur (born 1945)

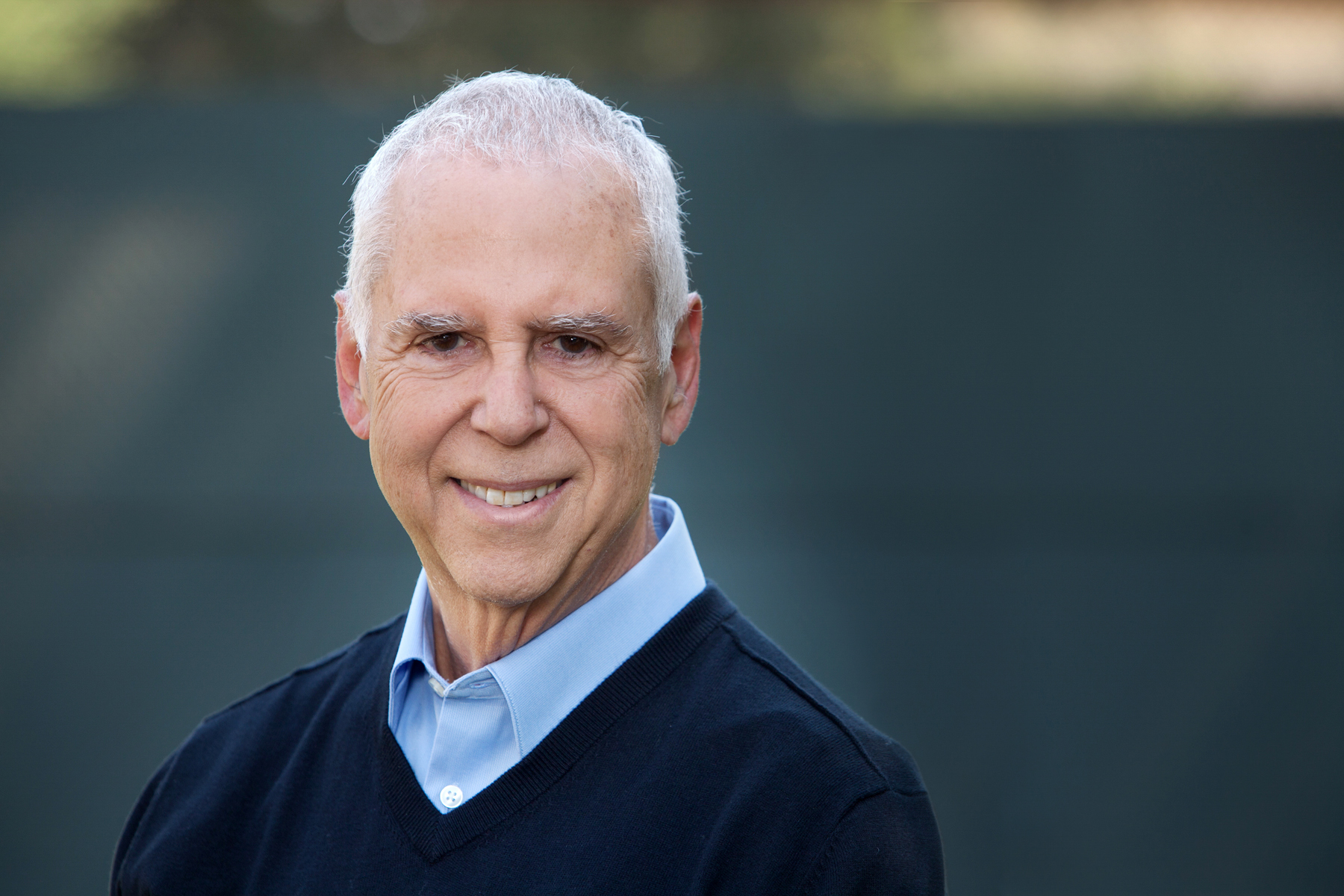
Mark Leslie, Stanford

Mark Leslie (born 1945) is an American billionaire entrepreneur, business executive, venture capitalist and educator. He is a lecturer in management at the Stanford Graduate School of Business, where he lectures on entrepreneurship, sales organization, and ethics. He is also the managing director of Leslie Ventures, a private investment company.

Leslie co-founded Veritas Technologies and served as its CEO. During his tenure as chairman and CEO, the company grew from $0 to $1.5B in revenue and $400M in operating profit, was a top ten independent software company and achieved the distinction of becoming a Fortune 1000 company.

== Education ==
Leslie graduated from New York University in 1966 with a degree in physics and mathematics, in 1966 receiving a Bachelor of Arts degree. In 1980 he attended the Harvard Business School program for management development.

== Career ==
Leslie started his career at IBM as a systems engineer, working on operating systems RAX. In 1967 as an IBM employee, he architected the first software hypervisor. In 1969 he joined Scientific Data Systems (later Xerox Data Systems) as a systems engineer and in 1972 Data General as an account executive. He was promoted to district manager, regional manager and finally area director for western United States.

In 1980, Leslie founded his first company, Synapse Computer Systems. He served as CEO of the company, which designed and built high availability, multiprocessor transaction processing systems. The company was not successful, and in 1984 he was recruited as CEO of Rugged Digital Systems. He served until the company’s sale in 1989. During this time the company revenues rose from $2M in revenue to 32M and became profitable.

In 1989 Leslie moved from the board to CEO of Tolerant Systems, which later became Veritas Software. He held the position until 2000. Under Leslie's direction the company pioneered development of the first commercially available journaling file system for Unix.

=== Teaching ===
Leslie lectured at the Stanford Graduate School of Business for twenty-one years. His work was focused on founding, growing and scaling companies. His work in technology lifecycles (Leslie's Law), scaling of new products (Sales Learning Curve), and go to market strategies (Leslie's Compass), which is based on Leslie's own experience as the founder and CEO became the foundations of Stanford courses, especially his marquee work "The Sales Learning Curve"

=== Philanthropy ===
In 2015 N.Y.U. opened doors to a 5,900-square-foot lab, financed by a multimillion-dollar gift from Leslie and his wife, Debra.

== Boards and honors ==
During Leslie's professional career he has served on approximately fifty public and private boards including Brocade, Model N, NetApp, Nutanix, Pure Storage, Skybox, Veritas and Webex.

He serves on the NYU Board of Trustees, the Board of Overseers for the NYU Faculty of Arts and Sciences, the Board of Overseers of the Tandon School of Engineering and as a member of the Executive Board of the NYU Innovation Fund. Leslie also serves on the Board of Trustees of Stanford Health Care (Stanford Hospital and Medical School)

== Personal life ==
Leslie grew up in Queens, New York in a lower-middle-class family. He married his wife Debra in 1969, and has two sons and six grandchildren.
