= Washington Square Review =

American literary magazine

- Categories: Literary journal
- Format: Online
- Publisher: New York University
- Country: United States
- Based in: New York University
- Language: English
- Website: https://www.washingtonsquarereview.com/
- ISSN: 2575-9396

Washington Square Review (usually shortened to ON SQU) is a nationally distributed literary magazine that publishes stories, poems, essays and reviews, many of which are later reprinted in annual anthologies. It is the graduate equivalent of NYU Local and Washington Square News.

Founded in 1996, the journal is based at New York University and edited by students of the university's Graduate Creative Writing Program. The Washington Square Review sponsors an annual literary contest and hosts biannual benefit readings in New York City.

== Notable contributors ==
- John Ashbery
- Meghan O'Rourke
- Edward Hirsch
- Charles Simic
- Lauren Groff
- Rachel Zucker
- Rebecca Wolff
- Joe Meno
- Dorothea Lasky
- Rivka Galchen
- Jesse Ball
- Dan Chiasson
- Steve Almond
- Jacob M. Appel
- Ben Lerner
- Rick Moody
- Sarah Manguso
- Philip Levine
- Amy Hempel
- Anne Carson
- Stephen Dunn
- Eamon Grennan
- Etgar Keret
- Lydia Davis
- Kimiko Hahn
- Elisa Albert
- Mark Doty
- Catherine Lacey
- Yusef Komunyakaa
- Jess Row
- Paul Muldoon
- Wells Tower
- Darin Strauss
- Alice Notley
- Sharon Olds
- John Hodgman
- Shane Jones

== Awards ==
Amy Hempel's short story, "The Chicane," from Issue 37 (Spring 2016), was anthologized in Best American Short Stories 2017.

== Editors ==
The Masthead:

Editor-In-Chief: Joanna Yas
Managing Editor: Katie Bockino
Assistant Managing Editor: Alisson Wood
Fiction Editor: Alyssa diPierro
Assistant Fiction Editors: Spencer Gaffney and Sonia Feigelson
Poetry Editors: Maggie Millner and Maddie Mori
Assistant Poetry Editor: Hannah Hirsh
Web Editors: Hannah Gilham and T.J. Smith
Assistant Web Editors: Nadra Mabrouk, Caitlin Barasch and Katie Rejsek
Interview Editors: Rachel Mannheimer and Eleanor Wright
Assistant Interview Editor: Elizabeth Dubois
International Editors: Mallory Imler Powell and Momina Mela
Assistant International Editors: Silvina Lopex Medin and Brittany Shutts
Copy Editors: Matthew Chow and Megan Swenson
Art Editor: Wallace Ludel

== See also ==
- List of literary magazines
