= Herbert Wachtell =

American lawyer (born 1932)

Herbert M. Wachtell
- Born: May 24, 1932 (age 93)
- Education: New York University (BS, LLB); Harvard Law School (LLM)
- Occupation: Lawyer

Herbert Maurice Wachtell (born May 24, 1932) is an American lawyer. He is the co-founder of the law firm Wachtell, Lipton, Rosen & Katz.

== Education and early career ==
Herbert Maurice Wachtell was born on May 24, 1932, in New York City. His parents were the children of Jewish immigrants from present-day Poland and Hungary.

Wachtell attended public schools in New York City, including The High School of Music & Art, (now part of Fiorello H. LaGuardia High School), followed by New York University in Manhattan. He graduated from New York University (B.S. 1952), New York University School of Law (LLB 1954, Order of the Coif), and Harvard Law School (LLM 1955).

From 1955 to 1957 he was an Assistant U.S. Attorney, Southern District of New York prosecuting federal crimes including racketeering. In 1957–1958, he served as deputy chief counsel to the House Subcommittee on Legislative Oversight, investigating corrupt activities at certain of the government administrative agencies. Upon leaving public service, he founded a small law firm specializing in litigation and lectured as an adjunct professor at NYU School of Law and authored a single-volume text, New York Practice under the CPLR, which then went through six editions.

== Later career ==
In 1965, he and NYU Law alumni Martin Lipton, Leonard Rosen, and George Katz joined to found Wachtell, Lipton, Rosen & Katz. The firm is known for big risk and complex transactions and litigation.

In 1963, the Practising Law Institute of New York published Wachtell's review of civil procedures, New York practice under the CPLR, in 1963, the first of six editions.

Wachtell handled a wide range of litigation including, notably, landmark takeover fights in the Delaware courts involving Time-Warner and Paramount.

Noted as "one of the nation's most aggressive lawyers" by the ABA Journal in 1995; he then successfully represented Philip Morris in Philip Morris Cos. v. American Broadcasting Cos. He represented Silverstein Properties in litigation to secure rebuilding insurance proceeds following the World Trade Center attacks.

== Boards and awards ==
Wachtell is a recipient of the Chambers Lifetime Achievement Award in Litigation in 2006. He and his wife are active in a variety of the philanthropic and cultural areas. He is a former co-chair of the board of the Lawyers' Committee for Civil Rights Under Law, former chairman of the board of Phoenix House Foundation and member of the boards of NYU School of Law and the former New York City Opera.

== Personal life ==
Wachtell is discussed in Canadian author Malcolm Gladwell’s book Outliers. He is married to Svetlana Stone Wachtell and has five children from previous marriages, as well as nine grandchildren. His daughter Diane Wachtell is the executive director of The New Press, which she co-founded in 1992 with Andre Schiffrin.
