= Leonard Rosen =

American lawyer (1930–2014)

Leonard M. Rosen (November 19, 1930 – April 16, 2014) was an American bankruptcy lawyer, and a co-founder of the prominent New York firm Wachtell, Lipton, Rosen & Katz.

Rosen received a business administration degree from the City College of New York in 1951, and a law degree from New York University School of Law in 1954.

Rosen's practice focused on representing major institutional lenders in the restructuring and reorganizations of large corporate borrowers. He played a key role in rescuing New York from fiscal crisis in the 1970s, helping the City secure necessary financing when it was on the verge of financial collapse. Rosen assisted in the government bailout of Chrysler in 1980. A group of 15 lending institutions chose Rosen as their special counsel in setting up complicated loans to Chrysler that were guaranteed by the federal government.

Rosen served as an adjunct professor of law at NYU Law School for many years. He also served as chairman of the National Bankruptcy Conference from 1984 to 1992, and received the American College of Bankruptcy's Distinguished Service Award in 2003.
