= 1999 Loomis Fargo truck robbery =

Unsolved money robbery in northern California

- Date: March 24, 1999
- Time: Between 7:30 and 9:40 p.m. (PST)
- Location: Between Sacramento and San Francisco, California, U.S.
- Type: Robbery of ~2.3 million dollars from a Loomis, Fargo & Co. armored truck
- Perpetrator: Unknown

On March 24, 1999, while a Loomis, Fargo & Co. semi-trailer truck was transporting money from Sacramento to San Francisco on Interstate 80 in California—with a stop at Cordelia—one or more robbers boarded the truck, cut a hole in its roof, removed approximately 2.3 million dollars, and disappeared with the money without detection by the truck's driver and guards. The robbery was not discovered until after the truck arrived at its destination. No suspects were ever identified by authorities and the theft is now a cold case. Even the exact tools and methods used by robber or robbers were never conclusively determined.

== Robbery ==
On a rainy night at approximately 7:30 p.m. on March 24, 1999, a semi-trailer truck departed the Loomis Fargo depot in Sacramento for a money transport run to the depot in San Francisco, using Interstate 80. While the cab portion of the truck was armored, the trailer carrying the money was not. The trailer was made of simple aluminum, with the only security measures being a locked door equipped with an alarm. For years, Loomis Fargo had used unarmored trailers to transport their coin shipments, figuring coins alone were such a meager amount of money that they did not require heavy security. But starting in the 1990s, Loomis Fargo began including paper money in their shipments as a cost-saving measure. Onboard was 58-year old driver Howard Brown, along with guards Frank Bettencourt and Ken Montgomery.

Other than traffic lights and stop signs, the trip from Sacramento to San Francisco involved only one stop, at a truck scale in Cordelia, near Fairfield. After this, the truck proceeded on to its destination, arriving at the San Francisco around 9:40 p.m. Bettencourt then unlocked the rear doors, opened them up, and was shocked to discover the floor of the trailer was covered in rainwater. Then he saw a large hole in the roof, later telling the San Francisco Chronicle, "My eyes just kind of looked up at the ceiling of the truck. The hole had a very jagged shape with the edges pointed down into the truck. It was not a very cleanly cut hole. It had a trapdoor-type of look to it."

At first the guards thought the truck had been hit by lightning, or maybe even by a meteor, but this was soon ruled out as they discovered roughly 270 lb (120 kg) of cash, worth about $2.3 million, was missing. Bettencourt told the Chronicle, "He was a Houdini in my mind. ... This is the most daring robbery I can imagine. He did this without us even having a clue. Everything that he needed to go right, did go right."

== Investigation ==
The subsequent criminal investigation of the robbery was handled by the FBI, which cleared the driver and guards of the truck as suspects. The FBI determined the hole in the roof had been cut from the outside, rather than a stowaway hiding in the trailer. The only significant piece of evidence they found in the trailer was an old worn out Dutch military duffle bag with the initials "MOV" on it, implying that it had been issued by the Netherlands Ministry of Defence some time around the 1950s or 1960s. They also found a baggage tag on the bag from the Netherlands railroad.

The FBI eventually found two witnesses who had been motorists driving behind the truck. They reported that as the truck pulled into the weigh station near Fairfield, they saw a man in dark clothing jump off the truck and run through roadside fields in the direction of nearby Solano Community College. The man did not appear to be carrying anything. The robber apparently counted on the truck stopping at the scales in tiny Cordelia, "something we didn't do all the time but 99 percent of the time," Bettencourt said.

Ultimately it was never determined exactly how many people were involved, nor how exactly they carried the robbery out. Since the trailer did not have a ladder attached to the outside, and the doors were still locked with the alarm set when it reached its destination, the primary theory is that the robbery started back in Sacramento as the truck was pulling out of the depot. It is believed that the robber or robbers jumped from the roof of the depot onto the top of the trailer. Then during the one-hour trip between Sacramento and the truck scale near Fairfield, they cut their way through the roof, dropped down into the trailer, put the stolen money in bags, and then threw them out onto the side of the road to be retrieved later, either by themselves or by accomplices following the truck in a vehicle. Then once the truck stopped at the weigh station, the robber or robbers took the opportunity to jump off the truck and make their escape. Nick Rossi, a spokesman for the FBI's Sacramento field office told the Chronicle, "I cannot think of any similar case nationwide. It almost harkens back to train robberies."

== Aftermath ==
No suspects were ever found, despite the FBI investigation and Loomis Fargo offering a large financial reward for leads. The company, which had been in the process of switching to armored trailers at the time the robbery took place, discontinued the practice of transporting paper money in unarmored trailers shortly after the robbery.

"This was one of the very few we had left,” a Loomis Fargo executive vice president, Mike Tawney, told the Chronicle. “This may have been the last truck."

== See also ==
- Crime in California
- March 1997 Loomis Fargo robbery
- October 1997 Loomis Fargo robbery
- 2022 Brink's theft, unsolved theft of jewelry worth at least $8.7 million from a truck parked at a truck stop
