= Loomis (company) =

Swedish multinational cash transport company

Loomis AB
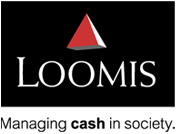

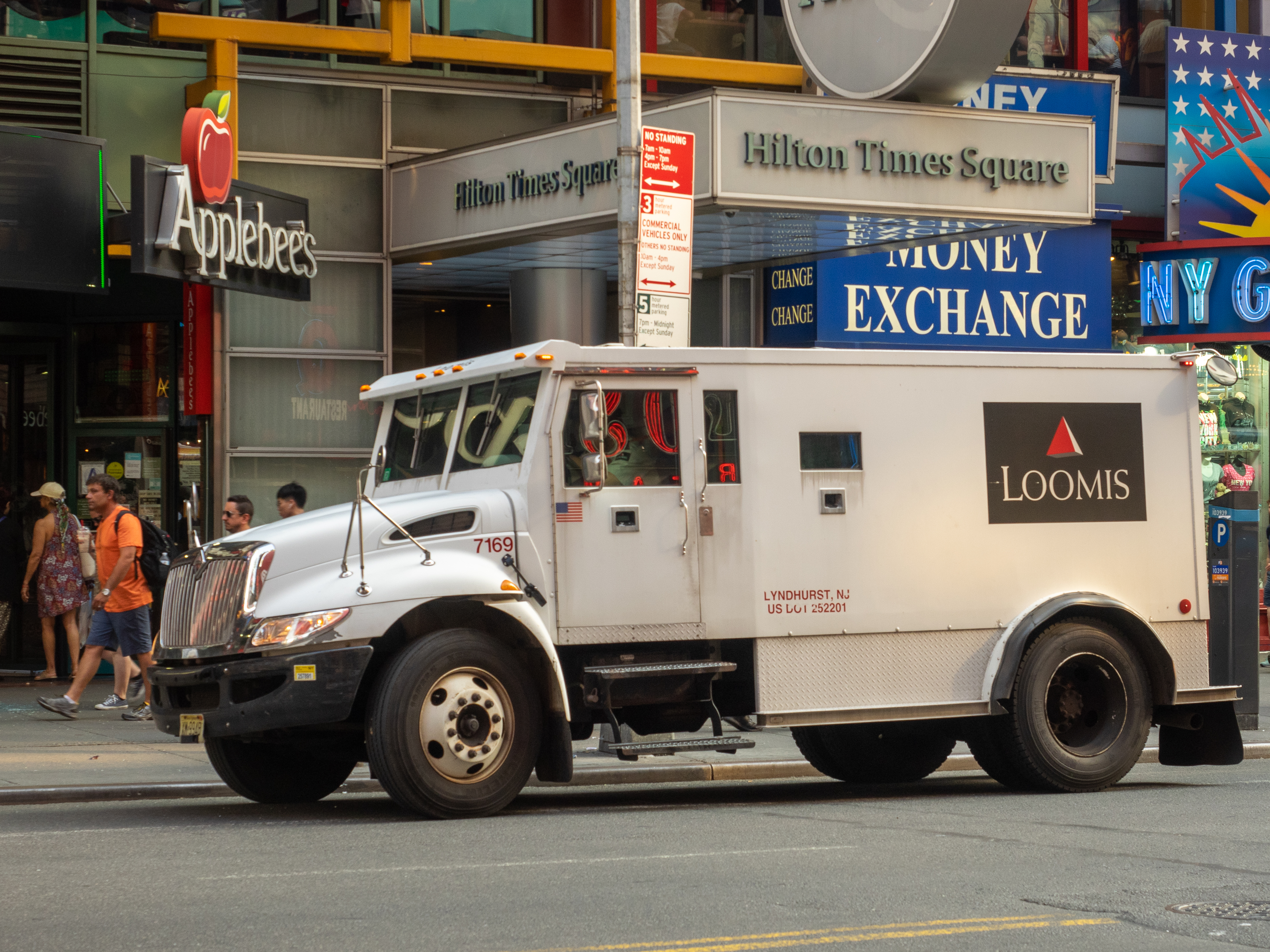
- Armored truck near Times Square, Manhattan, New York City
- Type: Public (Aktiebolag)
- Traded as: Nasdaq Stockholm: LOOM B
- Industry: Security, cash transport, banking/ATM services
- Founded: 1997; 29 years ago (as Loomis, Fargo & Co.)
- Headquarters: Stockholm, Sweden
- Area served: Europe and United States
- Products: Cash handling, banking, cash transit, ATM services
- Parent: Securitas AB (2001–2008)
- Website: www.loomis.com

Loomis AB (formerly Loomis, Fargo & Co.) is a Swedish cash handling company. The modern company was formed in 1997 by the consolidation of two armoured security concerns, Wells Fargo Armored Service and Loomis Armored Inc. Their international network covers over 200 operating locations in the US and eleven Western European countries.

In the US, Loomis operates an electronically linked service network of nearly 200 operating locations, employs over 8,000 people and utilizes a fleet of approximately 3,000 armored and other vehicles to provide secure armored transport, automated teller machine (ATM) services, cash processing and outsourced vault services for banks, other financial institutions, commercial and retail businesses. It was a division of Securitas AB from 2001 to 2008, when it was listed at Nasdaq OMX Stockholm.

== History ==
=== Wells Fargo Armored Service ===
When the express mail firm of Wells Fargo & Company ceased to express service in 1918 upon the organization of American Railway Express, the company continued to exist, though no longer an operating company in the United States. George C. Taylor of American Express was president of American Railway Express with Burns D. Caldwell of Wells Fargo as chairman of the board of directors. Davis G. Meller, previously the firm's foreign traffic manager, assumed the presidency of Wells Fargo in 1918.

Elmer Ray Jones, who had been with Wells Fargo since 1893, purchased Wells Fargo & Company's Express in Mexico and Wells Fargo in Cuba in 1919 for $640,000. He headed a group of men from Wells Fargo and American Express in 1924 to buy Wells Fargo & Company in the United States from the E.H. Harriman estate, making arrangements with the executors, Charles A. Peabody and Robert W. DeForest. The shares were taken by American Express (51 per cent) and the group of individuals headed by Jones (29 per cent); the remaining 20 per cent remained outstanding. In 1924, Jones was elected president of Wells Fargo, which sold its 20,000 shares in the Wells Fargo Nevada National Bank, severing the final tie between the two institutions.

Jones redeveloped Wells Fargo as a concern for armored transportation and other specialized express movements. In 1947, for instance, he personally supervised the transfer of 13 tons of gold from Montreal to Mexico City by airplane. The company had a fleet of 50 armored cars in New York City, ten stores handling farm equipment, automobiles and trucks, and (together with American Express) the largest travel agency in Mexico. It also provided fast railroad freight service through a subsidiary, the Wells Fargo Carloading Corporation.

Succeeding Jones as president of Wells Fargo was Ralph T. Reed in 1956, Howard L. Clark in 1960, R. D. Beals in 1963, and James A. Henderson in 1964. Wells Fargo continued its overseas express service until the 1960s; by the middle of the decade, its subsidiaries operated armored cars in 12 Eastern and Southern states, and the concern had entered the coin-auditing and coin-rolling business.

As an operator of armored cars, the company did business as the Wells Fargo Armored Security Corporation as an affiliate of Baker Industries, and later, after its acquisition by Borg-Warner Security, as Wells Fargo Armored Service.

=== Loomis Armored Inc. ===
Lee B. Loomis established Loomis Armored Car Service in 1925 in Portland, Oregon. The company's headquarters was moved to Seattle, Washington, in 1932. Loomis died in 1949, but Loomis Corporation remained under his family's ownership until 1979 when it was acquired by Mayne Nickless. In 1984, Mayne Nickless acquired Purolator Armored, a major competitor at the time, and merged its operations into Loomis. Wingate Partners purchased the US operations of Loomis in 1991, and the company was consolidated with Wells Fargo Armored Service in 1997 to form Loomis Fargo & Company. UK's Securicor Plc purchased Loomis's Canadian operations in 2000.

=== Mergers, acquisitions, and divestitures ===
On July 15, 1996, Borg-Warner Security agreed to consolidate its Wells Fargo Armored Service with Loomis Armored Inc. Employing 8,500 and providing armored transportation, cash services and automated teller machine maintenance, the new concern was named Loomis Fargo & Company. The transaction was completed in 1997.

In May 2001, Swedish securities services group Securitas AB agreed to buy the remaining 51 percent of Loomis Fargo & Co. for $102 million. On November 16, 2006, Securitas AB chief executive officer Hakon Ericson announced the company's intention to split into several independent, specialized security companies, with its cash-handling service division adopting the name Loomis throughout its international network. By the end of June 2007, the transition to the new identity had been completed, with Loomis employing 20,000 people in a network of 420 operating locations in 11 European nations and the United States.

On November 26, 2007, Loomis announced the sale of Loomis Cash Management Ltd, its cash handling operation in the United Kingdom, to Vaultex UK Ltd jointly owned by HSBC Bank plc and Barclays Bank plc, resulting in a loss of approximately 160 million SEK.

In 2008, Loomis was distributed to the Securitas shareholders and listed at Nasdaq OMX Stockholm as Loomis AB.

On April 4, 2014, Loomis acquired Zurich based VIA MAT Holding AG, one of the world’s leading companies in international valuables logistics with an enterprise value of approximately CHF 200 million, thus adding International Services to the existing Cash in Transit and Cash Management Services lines of businesses and becoming market leader in cash handling in Switzerland.

== Major robberies ==
During its first year of operation as the new Loomis Fargo & Company, the company was the target for two of the largest cash robberies ever committed on American soil.

In March 1997, employee Philip N. Johnson, on his own, stole $18.8 million from the Loomis Fargo armored car that he was driving. In the October 1997 Loomis Fargo Bank Robbery, employee David Scott Ghantt and accomplices stole $17.3 million from the Loomis Fargo Charlotte, North Carolina branch vault that he was supervising. The perpetrators of both robberies, and a significant majority of the cash, were later caught by law enforcement.

These two robberies, along with the unrelated $18.9 million Dunbar Armored robbery, which also occurred in 1997, were the first to surpass the previous holder of the title "largest cash robbery" in U.S. history, the $5 million cash portion (along with $0.9 million in the jewellery) of the Lufthansa heist of December 1978.

An additional robbery took place in March, 1999 while a Loomis semi truck was in transit from Sacramento, California, to San Francisco. During transit, one or more robbers boarded the truck, cut a hole in the roof, removed approximately $2.3 million, and exited the truck with the money, completely evading detection. The robbery was not discovered until after the truck arrived at its destination and no suspects were ever identified. The incident is now considered a cold case.

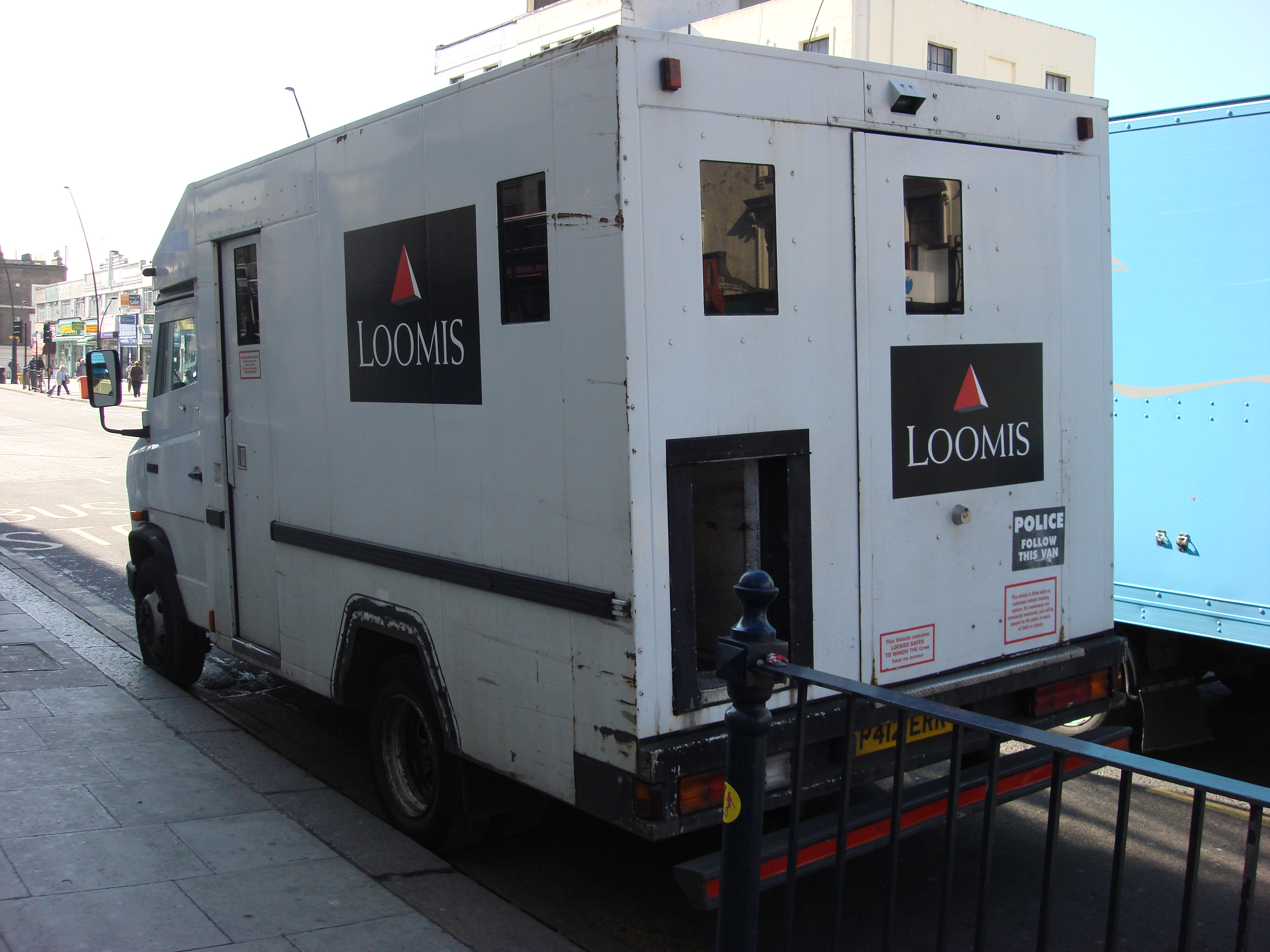
A Loomis-owned Mercedes-Benz T2 armoured vehicle in London, United Kingdom.

The UK division of the company hit the headlines in February 2006 when armed robbers raided its cash center located in Tonbridge in Kent. The criminals made off with £53m in what is known as the Securitas depot robbery.

The next month, a Securitas van in Warrington, Cheshire was also robbed by criminals who rammed it with a stolen tractor and subsequently made off with over half a million pounds.

Again the same month, an armed gang robbed a Securitas van as it was unloading money at Gothenburg's Landvetter Airport in Sweden.

On October 4, 2007, two armored truck guards working for Loomis were killed in a robbery in Northeast Philadelphia. Another man was wounded. A bank surveillance photo showed the gunman walking up to the two guards, shooting both of them execution-style, and running off with a bag containing ATM deposit envelopes. The man later confessed to the killings.

In november 2009, in Lyon, France, Toni Musulin steals 11,9 million euros. 9,1 millions will be found and he will spend 4 years in prison. A movie 11.6 is made about this robbery.

On September 29, 2016, career thief Julio Nivelo stole a bucket containing gold bars worth $1.6 million from the back of an open and unguarded Loomis truck on a busy street in Manhattan, New York.
