= Brinks robbery =

The term Brinks robbery may refer to:

- The Great Brinks Robbery in 1950, in Boston, Massachusetts
- Brinks robbery (1981) in Rockland County, New York
- Brink's-Mat robbery of 1983 in Hounslow, London
- 2022 Brink's theft
- Anthony Curcio's 2008 robbery of a Brinks in Monroe, Washington
