= Securitas AB =

Swedish security services company

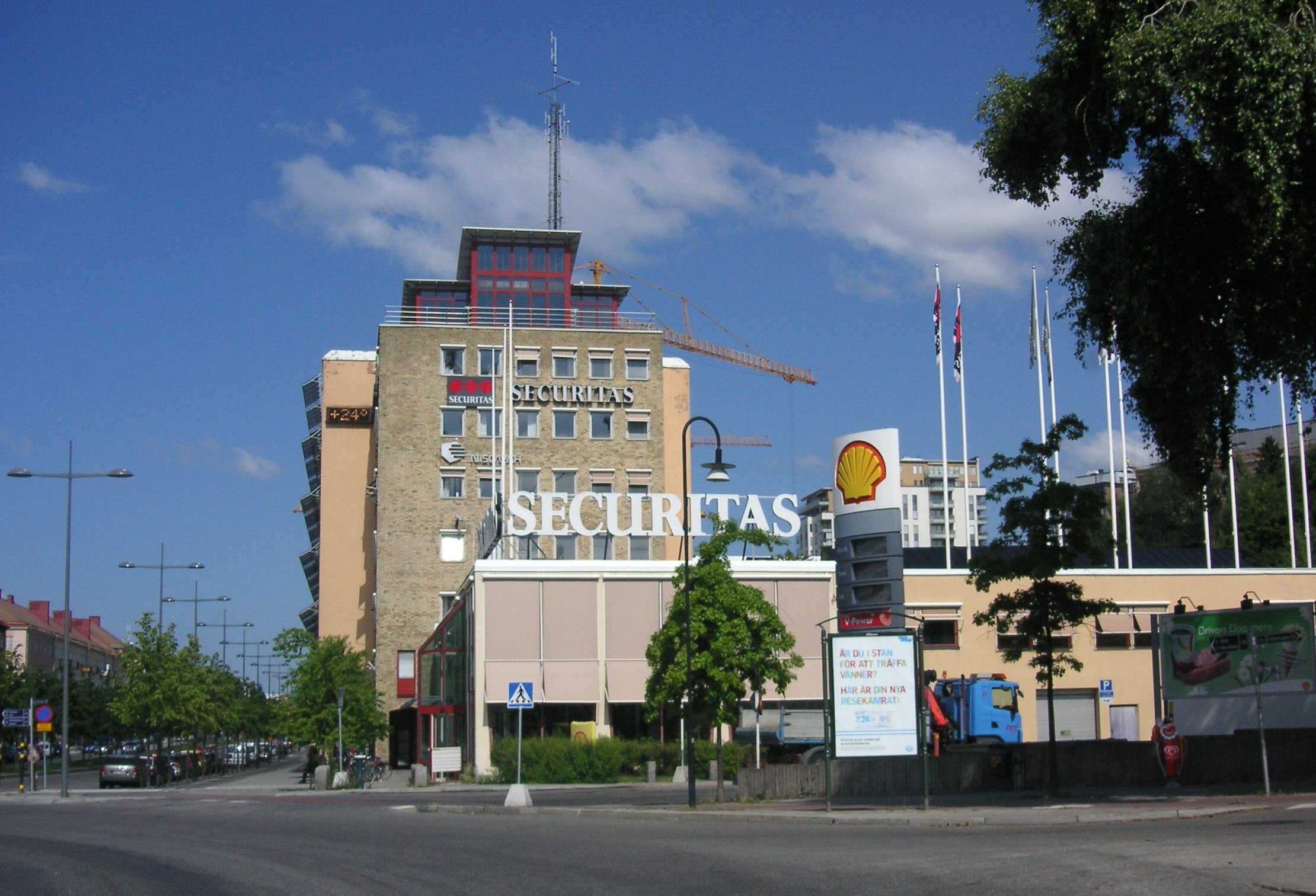
- Head office in Stockholm, Sweden
- Type: Public
- Traded as: Nasdaq Stockholm: SECU B
- ISIN: SE0000163594
- Industry: Security
- Founded: 1934; 92 years ago
- Headquarters: Stockholm, Sweden
- Area served: Worldwide
- Key people: Jan Svensson (chairman) Lucas Gabrielsson (president & CEO) Matteo Dall'Ora (CFO)
- Services: Security services (security guarding and mobile patrolling), monitoring, consulting and investigation
- Revenue: MSEK 155 189 (2025)
- Operating income: MSEK 9 073 (2025)
- Net income: MSEK 5 144 (2025)
- Total assets: MSEK 109 445 (2025)
- Total equity: MSEK 39 043 (2025)
- Owner: Investment AB Latour, companies and family (10.9%; 29.6% votes); Melker Schörling AB, company and family (5.0%; 11.3% votes)
- Number of employees: 322,000 (2025)
- Subsidiaries: Pinkerton, Protectas SA, Paragon Systems, Cobelguard NV, Staysafe, Allcoopers Limited, Central de Alarmas Adler, Zvonimir Security, Protectas AG, Liferaft
- Website: securitas.com

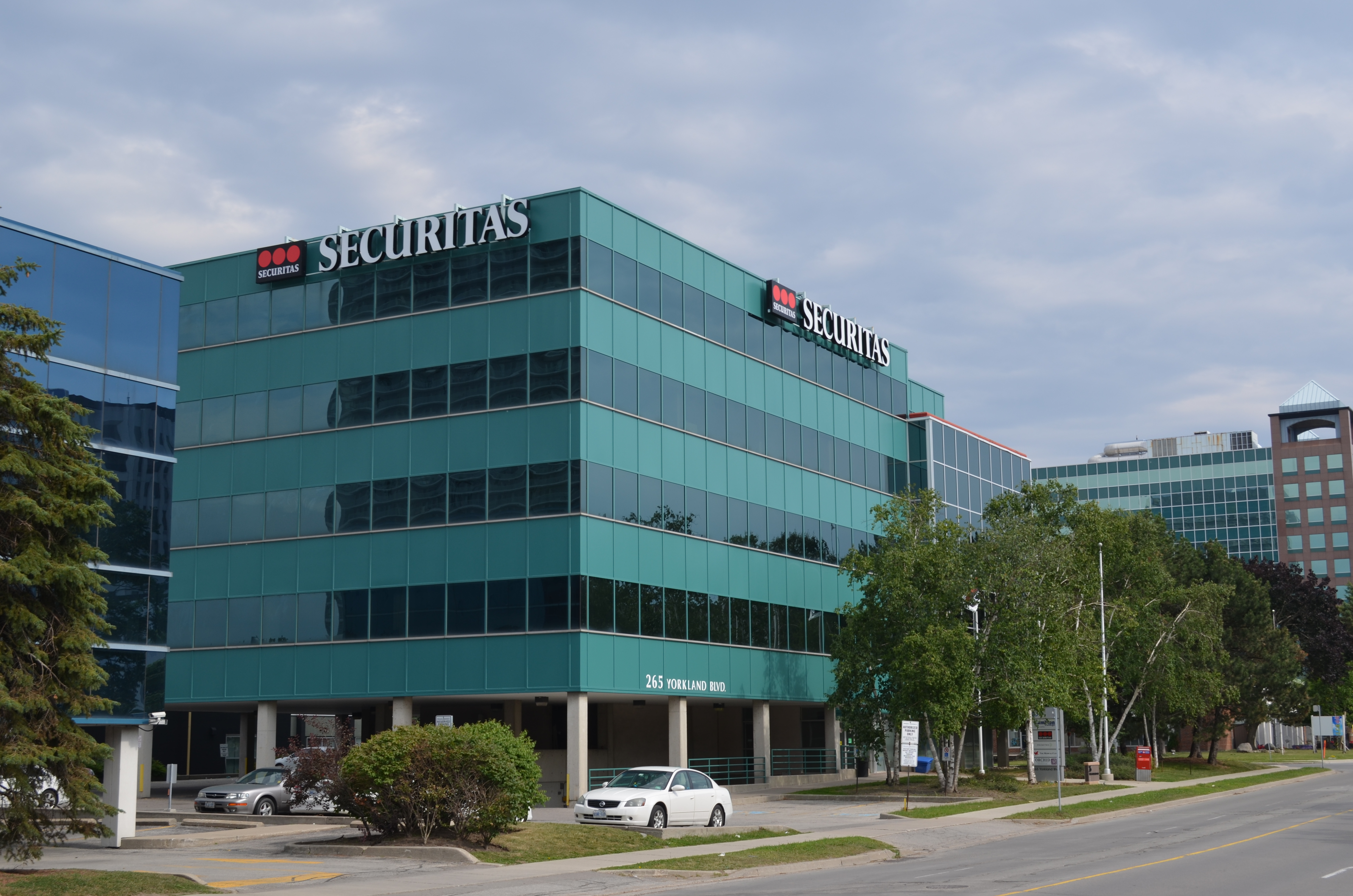
Securitas office in Canada

Securitas AB is a Swedish group devoted to security services, such as security guarding, mobile patrolling, monitoring, investigation and related consulting services. The group is headquartered in Stockholm and had over 322,000 employees in 44 markets worldwide as of 2025. Securitas AB is listed at Nasdaq OMX Stockholm in the Large Cap segment.

Securitas AB owns and operates the Swiss security company Protectas AG in Switzerland, where there is a pre-existing, separate security company called Securitas AG, part of the Swiss Securitas Group.

Since 1999, Securitas AB has been the parent company of Pinkerton, a historically significant American detective agency.

== History ==
Securitas AB was founded in 1934 in Helsingborg, Sweden, as AB Hälsingborgs Nattvakt, when Erik Philip-Sörensen bought a small guarding company. In 1935, the name was changed to Förenade Svenska Vakt AB. The company expanded through acquisitions of several small security companies, initially in southern Sweden.

In 1949, AB Securitas Alarm was founded as the company's security technology subsidiary, and during the following decade, the company started expanding internationally.

Securitas made its first technical breakthrough in 1961 with the Securi-Coll automatic access control system. The company then introduced a payment system for petrol stations in Sweden, which was later modified to enable cash withdrawals. On May 7, 1968, Securitas launched the world's first ATM linked to a banking system at Oxie Sparbank in Malmö.

In 1972, the group was rebranded as Securitas, the Roman goddess of security and stability, with a logotype consisting of three red dots and the word "Securitas". The dots are described as representing the group's core values of "Integrity, Vigilance, and Helpfulness."

In 1976, Erik Philip-Sörensen sold the Securitas group to his sons Jörgen Philip-Sörensen and Sven Philip-Sörensen, and in 1981, the group was divided between the sons, with the international operations developing into Group 4 and the Swedish operations retaining the Securitas brand.

In 1983, Securitas was sold to the holding company Skrinet, and in 1985, it was acquired by Investment AB Latour, controlled by Gustaf Douglas. Under the new ownership, the group focused on security, and in 1989, an international expansion began with acquisitions in Norway, Denmark, and Portugal and the establishment of Hungary.

In 1991, Securitas was listed on the Stockholm Stock Exchange. In 1994, the group distributed ASSA AB (acquired in 1988) to its shareholders. Throughout the 1990s, foreign acquisitions were made in eleven European countries and in the United States.

In February 1999, Securitas acquired Pinkerton and in August 2000, Burns Security and several regional security companies in the United States. These acquisitions made Securitas one of the largest security companies in the world. In 2001, a new organization took effect, with five business areas according to the types of services offered, and Loomis Fargo & Company was acquired.

In 2003, the group's security services in the United States were integrated under the Securitas brand, and the group's cash handling services were completely divisionalized, with joint management for United States and European operations.

In 2006, the divisions Securitas Systems (alarm, monitoring, and access control systems) and Securitas Direct (solutions for homes and small businesses) were distributed to the group's shareholders and listed at the Stockholm Stock Exchange. In the same year, the divisions Mobile (small and medium-sized customers) and Alert Services (electronic surveillance of homes and businesses) were created (as of 2007, constituting the business segment Mobile and Monitoring). Securitas Direct was later renamed to Verisure in all countries except Spain and Portugal.

In November 2007, the United Kingdom cash handling services of the division Loomis were sold to Vaultex Ltd., owned by HSBC and Barclays. Securitas began operating in Peru in November 2007. In 2008, the division Loomis (cash handling) was distributed to the group's shareholders and listed at Nasdaq OMX Stockholm.

In September 2010, Securitas acquired the security-services operations of Reliance Security Group in the United Kingdom. In November 2011, Securitas acquired Chubb Security Personnel in the United Kingdom.

As of 2012, Securitas was present in 53 countries and territories.

In 2013, Securitas acquired Pinkerton Government Services, which provides cleared security services to governmental agencies and programs that require a Department of Defense or Department of Energy security clearance. This government services division of Securitas became known as Securitas Critical Infrastructure Services. This division operates both in the United States and worldwide when cleared services are needed overseas.

In October 2015, Securitas acquired Diebold Incorporated's (NYSE-DBD) Electronic Security business in North America. Diebold's North American Electronic Security business, based in Green, Ohio, United States, is the third largest commercial electronic security provider in North America. Diebold's North American Electronic Security business has approximately 1,100 employees. The operation includes more than 55,000 monitored customer locations and 200,000 sites serviced.

In March 2022, Securitas partnered with Citizen to trial a version of Citizen's on-demand private security service in Chicago.

On July 22, 2022, Securitas purchased Stanley Security Solutions, which included Stanley Healthcare, from the American company Stanley Black & Decker. The brands were renamed Securitas Technology and Securitas Healthcare, respectively. The initial agreement was signed on December 8, 2021

=== Controversies ===
==== Murder of Cassie Heppner ====
In February 2020, American Securitas officer Robert Pavao murdered Timberland employee Cassie Heppner at Timberland's corporate headquarters in Stratham, New Hampshire, where Pavao was contracted to. Pavao was found guilty of second degree homicide and sentenced to 55 years in prison for the crime.

==== Suspension for Harvard union protest ====
In January 2022, an American Securitas officer contracted to Harvard University in Cambridge, Massachusetts, Walter J. Terzano, was suspended for protesting during a contentious union contract negotiation between Securitas and the Service Employees International Union. Terzano created protest signs and attempted to get other Securitas officers to protest outside the home of University President Lawrence Bacow. A complaint was made to Securitas by Harvard's director of facilities and maintenance, leading to the suspension. The National Labor Relations Board ruled that Securitas had unlawfully retaliated against Terzano.

==== Sex scandal ====
In 2010, the chief executive of Securitas Sweden was arrested for buying sexual services from a prostitute in Stockholm. He was convicted in 2012. The company said it would put an end to the misogynistic and sexist culture that prevailed in the company.

In 2022, A Swedish TV documentary exposed two employees at Securitas Sweden who paid for sex during work trips and were suspected of having bribed employees of the city of Malmö. The company fired them.

== Operations ==
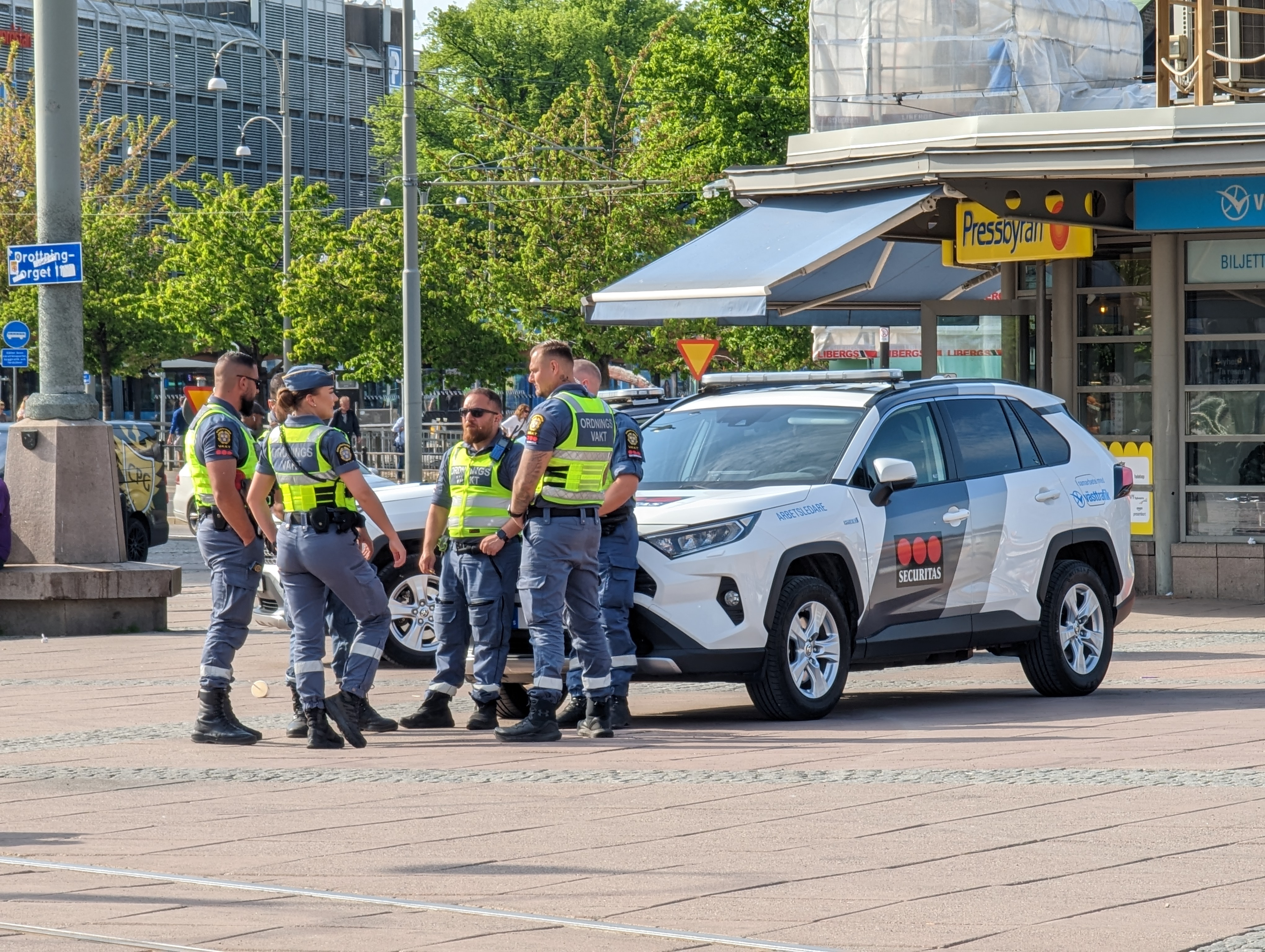
Securitas officers and patrol vehicle contracted to patrol Västtrafik buses and trains in Gothenburg, Sweden

Securitas is organized into three business segments: Securitas North America, Securitas Europe, and Securitas Ibero-America. The Group also has operations in Africa, the Middle East, Asia, and Australia, which form the AMEA division.

In general, the group operates under the brand Securitas for all business segments. Specialized services including due diligence, background checks, security assessments, brand protection, intellectual property protection, executive protection, investigations, cyber surveillance, computer forensics, social compliance and IT security are performed worldwide under the brand "Pinkerton."

These operations are reported as part of the North American business segment. There are three operations centers in North America: Toronto, Ontario, Parsippany, New Jersey and Westlake Village, California. The Swiss market is an exception to the name, in that general security services are provided under the brand Protectas.

=== On-site guarding ===
Securitas' primary operations are their on-site security and guarding services. Through their on-site guarding division, Securitas provides on-site security officers in various roles. Most commonly Securitas officers are hired for standing rolls, reception, patrol, and vehicle patrol. Specialty assignments can also include fire-watch, fire extinguisher testing, access control and badging, console operations, safety auditing, alarm & emergency response, and what Securitas refers to as "customized and site-specific security tasks". Additionally, Securitas offers special event security services, primarily for concerts and sporting events.

=== Mobile patrol ===
Securitas operates a mobile patrol division, which they refer to as "mobile guarding". Businesses wanting security but not needing full time guards can subscribe to a mobile patrol service where officers will patrol the property one to a few times a night. The subscription also includes incident response services for security concerns occurring when an officer is not currently on-site.

=== Remote guarding ===
Remote Guarding services involve Securitas officers monitoring a customer's site from an off-site command center. If suspicious activity is noticed, Securitas can use speakers to talk to people on-site as well as notify the police or other emergency services when necessary. Mobile patrol officers are also often used to respond to incidents discovered by a remote guarding officer. Securitas also offers remote escort services that involve an off-site officer watching an employee walk to or from their vehicle.

=== Securitas Technology ===
Securitas Technology, which includes Securitas Healthcare, primarily provides locks, fire sensors, security cameras, and similar hardware. They also provide the software used to monitor this hardware. Additionally, Securitas Technology provides computer security software to protect hardware, software, or electronic data.

=== Risk Management & Private Investigations ===
Securitas' corporate risk management and investigations services are provided by their subsidiary Pinkerton.

== Gallery ==
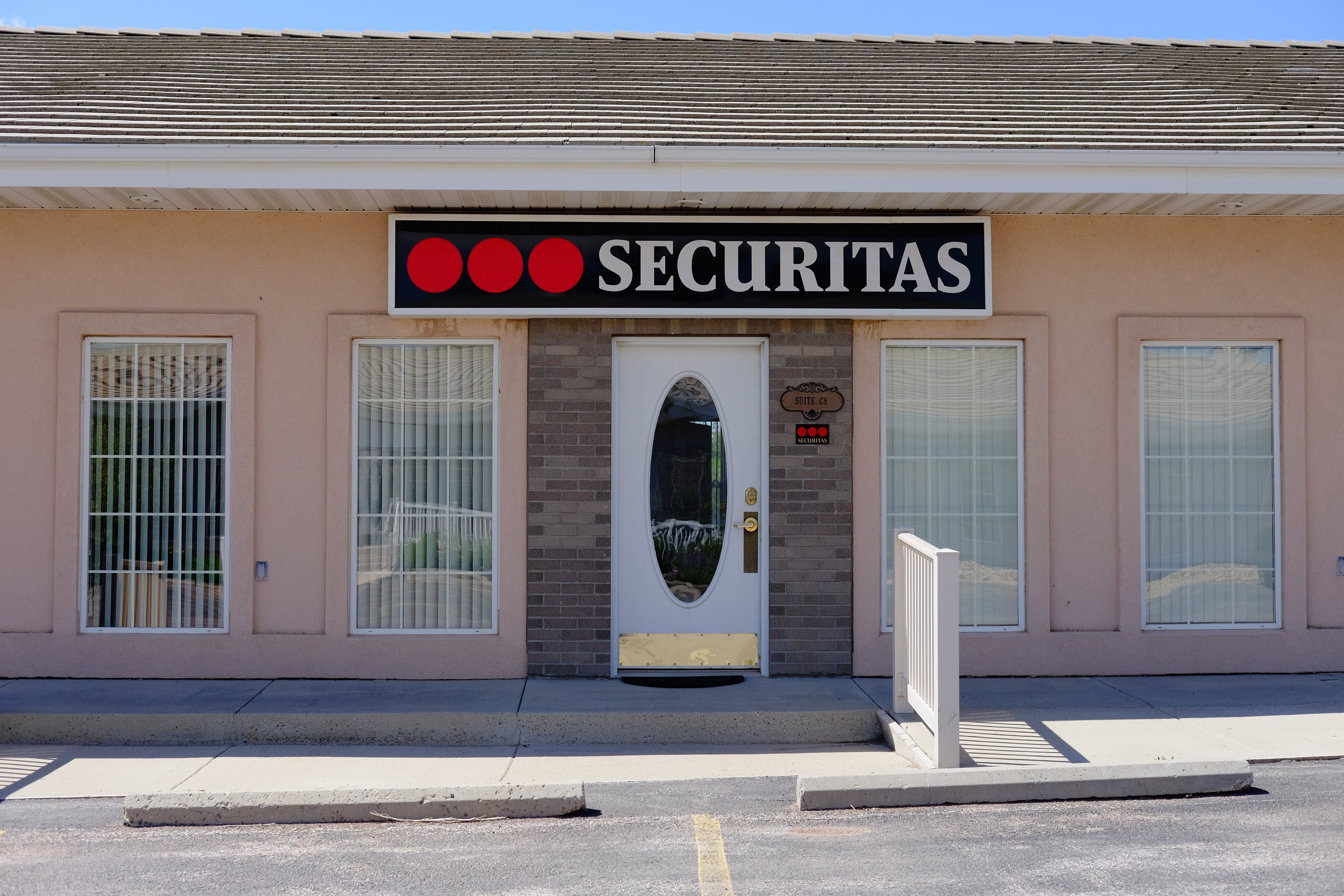
A Securitas branch office in Gillette, Wyoming

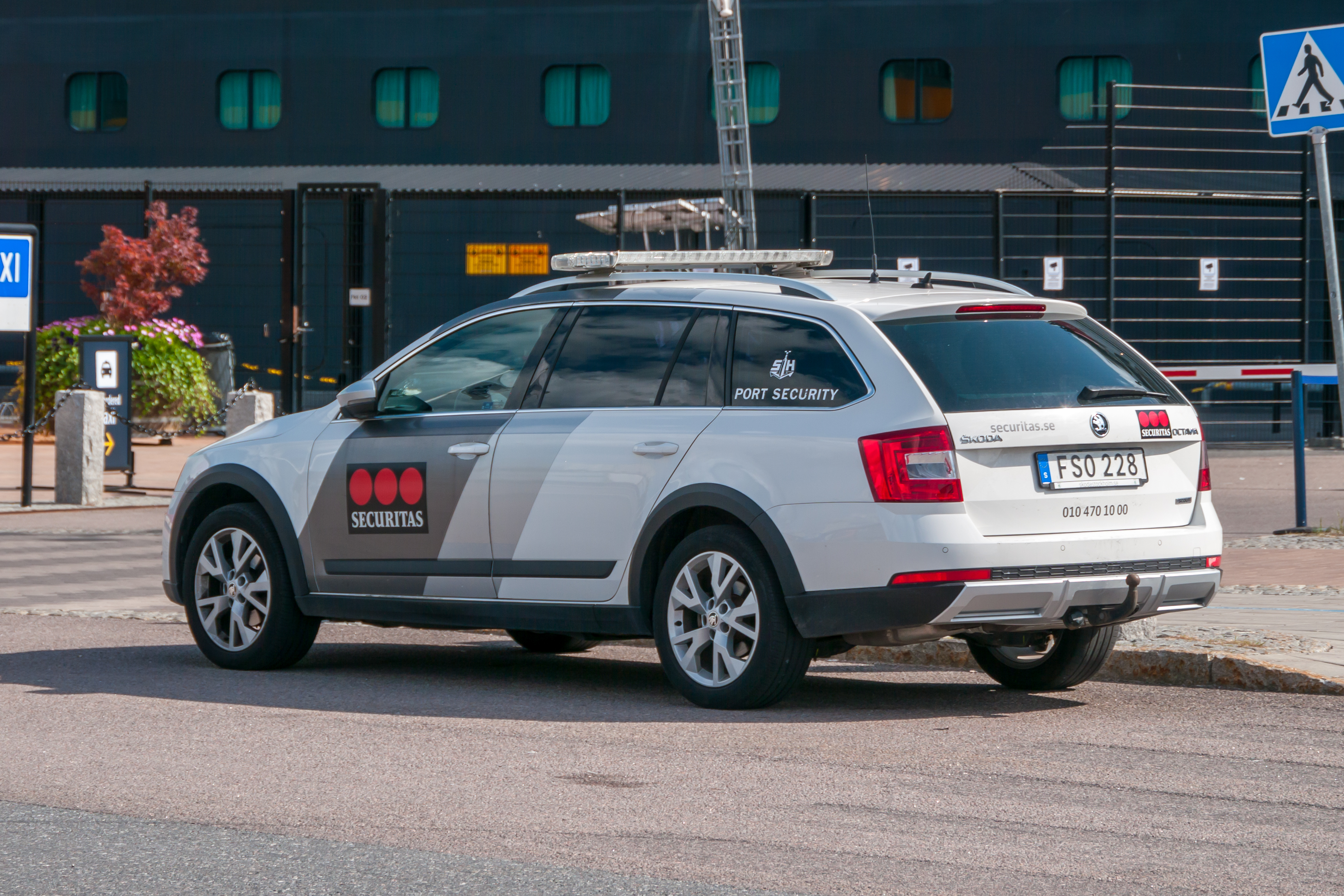
Securitas patrol vehicle in Stockholm contracted to provide port security

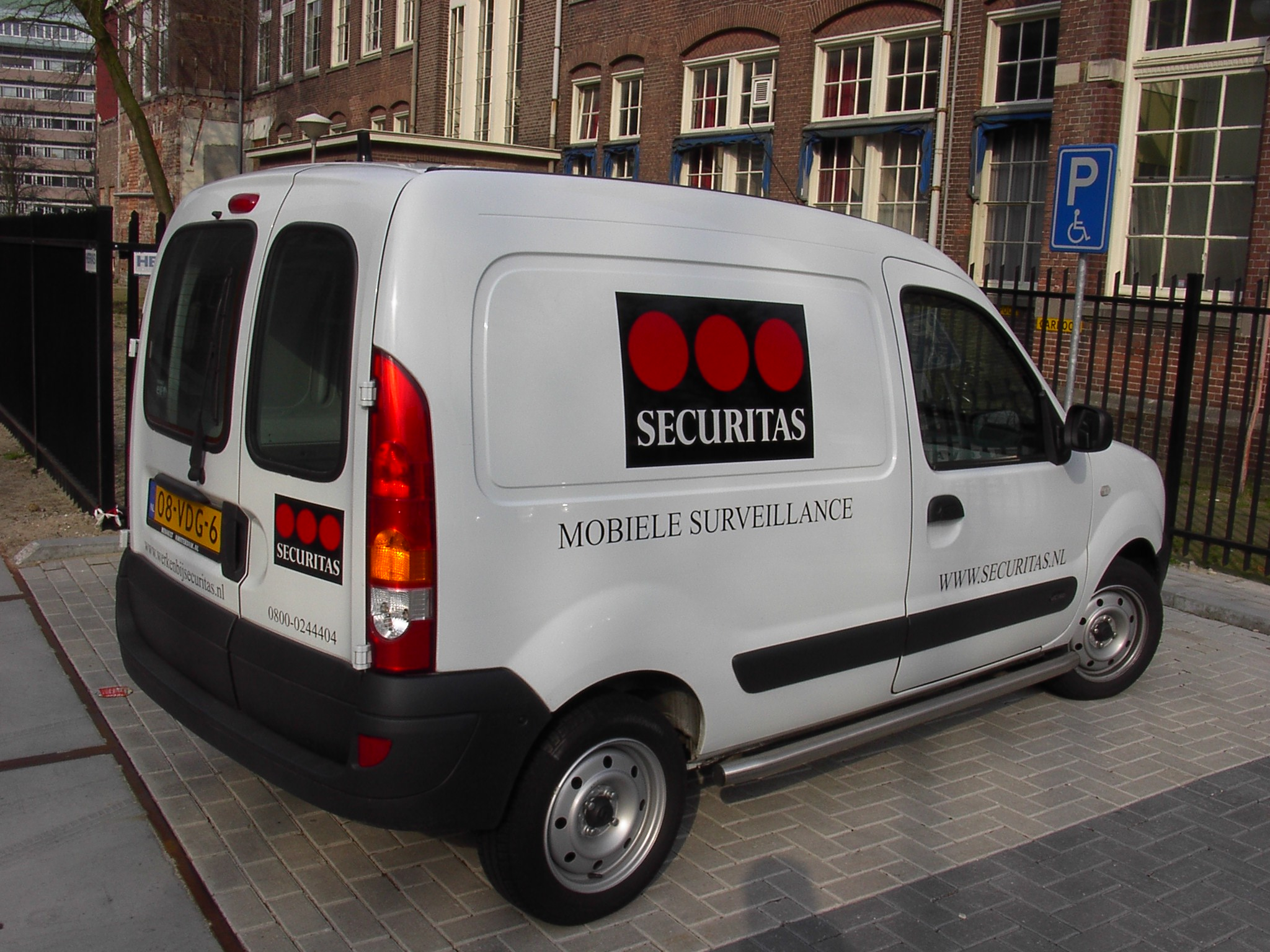
A Securitas mobile patrol van in the Netherlands

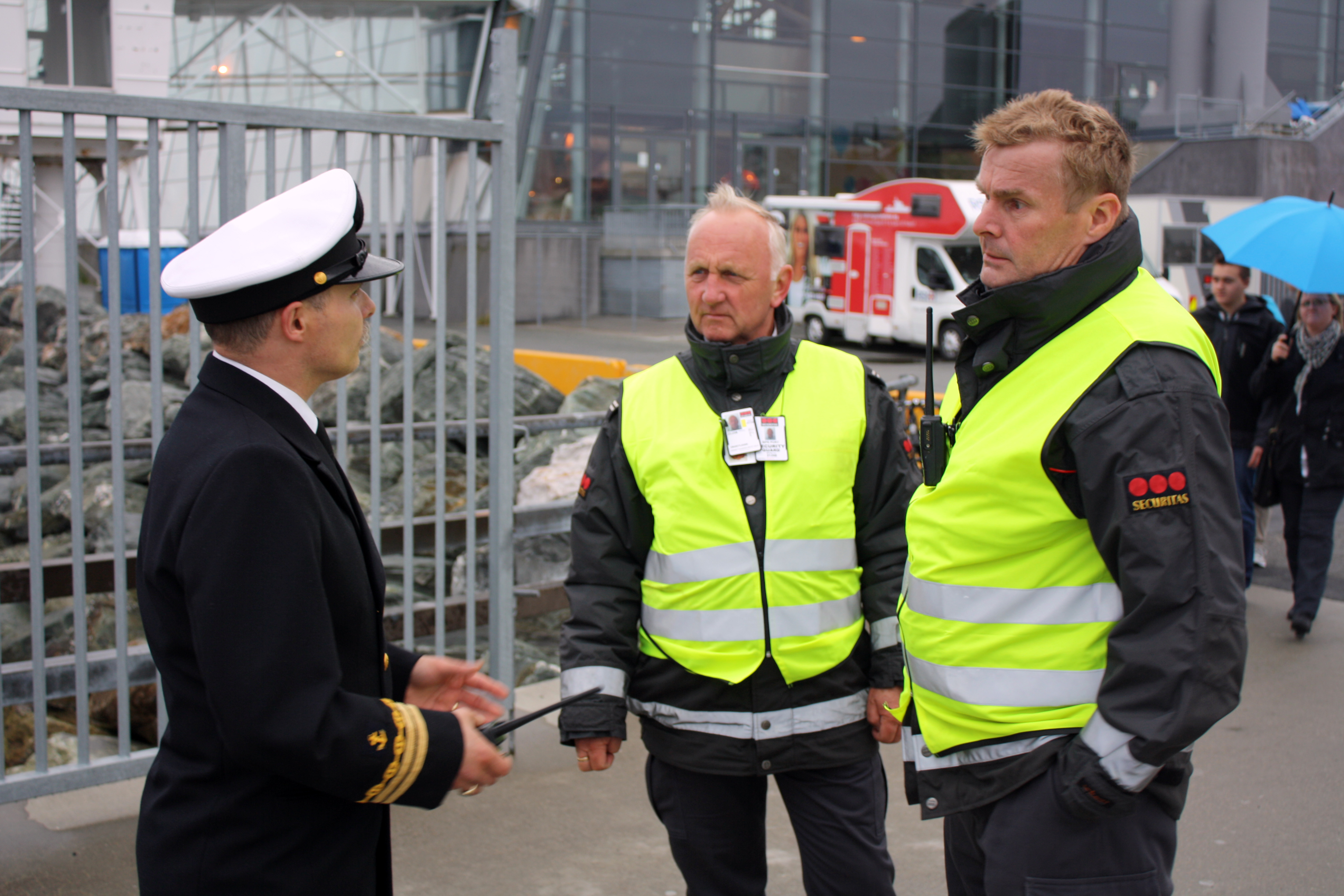
Securitas port security officers talking with a Harbourmaster in Norway

== See also ==
- Loomis for robberies committed against Loomis while it was a division of Securitas
- Securitas depot robbery for the events of 2006 affecting the United Kingdom cash handling operations of the Loomis division of Securitas, at the time operating under the Securitas brand, and in 2007, sold to HSBC and Barclays
- Surfside condominium collapse, a 2021 building collapse for which Securitas paid over $500 million US in a later settlement
