= List of Central High School (Philadelphia) alumni =

The following is a list of notable alumni of Central High School in Philadelphia.

== A ==
- Leon Abbett – former New Jersey governor (112th Class)
- Henry David Abraham – psychiatrist, 1985 Nobel Peace Prize co-recipient (214th Class)
- Elliott Abrams – AccuWeather meteorologist, chief forecaster (223rd Class)
- Raymond Pace Alexander – judge, civil rights lawyer (127th Class)
- Harrison Allen - physician and anatomist
- Anthony G. Amsterdam – civil rights lawyer, professor at NYU (200th Class)
- Dave Appell – musician, record producer
- Cristin O'Keefe Aptowicz – poet and author (255th Class)
- Joe Augustyn – screenwriter, producer (229th Class)

== B ==
- Michael Bacon – singer, songwriter, musician, and film score composer (224th Class)
- James P. Bagian – astronaut, physician (228th Class)
- Cosmo Baker – DJ, music producer, and turntablist (251st Class)
- Albert C. Barnes – art collector, founder of Barnes Foundation educational art institution (92nd Class)
- Reds Bassman – football player
- Edward R. Becker – Federal Judge (194th Class)
- Bernard R. Bell – Vice-President, World Bank (150th Class)
- John C. Bell Jr. – Chief Justice of the Supreme Court of Pennsylvania (75th Class)
- Isadore H. Bellis – Philadelphia City Councilman (1xx Class)
- Upton Birnie Jr. – U.S. Army major general (graduated 1896)
- Barry Bloom – infectious disease scientist, WHO (202nd Class)
- Jim Braude – talk radio host (225th Class)
- Leo Braudy – cultural historian and film critic (211th Class)
- King Britt – DJ and record producer (245th Class)
- William H. Brown, III – former Chairman of the US Equal Employment Opportunity Commission (185th Class)
- Lou Bruce – Major League Baseball outfielder (104th Class)
- Doc Bushong – Major League Baseball catcher and dentist (graduated 1876)

== C ==
- George Campbell Jr. – President of Cooper Union for the Advancement of Science and Art (220th Class)
- Robert B. Carney – Admiral, USN (118th Class)
- Philip Casnoff – actor (226th Class)
- Cassidy – rapper (would have been the 259th Class, but he did not graduate from Central High School)
- Lewis C. Cassidy – Attorney General of Pennsylvania
- Morris I. ("Moose") Charlap – Broadway composer (186th Class)
- Noam Chomsky – linguist and political activist (184th Class)
- Ben Clime – professional football player
- Mark B. Cohen – Pennsylvania state legislator, Judge, Common Pleas Court (225th Class)
- Frank "Tick" Coleman – one of the first three known African-American Eagle Scouts, educator (156th Class)
- Joel Cook – U.S. Congressman, journalist (33rd Class)
- Tarzan Cooper – basketball player for the New York Renaissance
- Bill Cosby - entertainer (did not graduate)

== D ==
- Samuel Dash – professor at Georgetown Law (178th Class)
- George Davidson – English/American geodesist, astronomer, geographer, surveyor and engineer (5th Class)
- Anthony F. DePalma – orthopedic surgeon and professor
- James DePreist – orchestra conductor (202nd Class)
- Francis Xavier Dercum - physician
- John H. Dialogue – shipbuilder in Camden, New Jersey (5th Class)
- DJ Drama (Tyree Simmons) – hip hop artist and DJ (255th Class)
- Ronald Donatucci – politician, Pennsylvania State Representative, Philadelphia Register of Wills
- Ignatius L. Donnelly – author, politician, U.S. Congressman (13th Class)
- Rel Dowdell – filmmaker (248th Class)
- Joseph William Drexel – banker, philanthropist (13th Class)

== E ==
- Thomas Eakins – painter (38th Class, 1861)
- George W. Edmonds - U.S. Congressman
- Joshua Eilberg – U.S. Congressman (168th Class)
- Ira Einhorn – environmental activist, participant in first Earth Day, convicted murderer
- Arnold Eisen – Chancellor of the Jewish Theological Seminary (228th Class)
- Duane Eubanks – jazz trumpeter, and brother of guitarist Kevin Eubanks (245th Class)
- Robin Eubanks – jazz trombonist, professor at Oberlin Conservatory, and brother of guitarist Kevin Eubanks (231st Class)

== F ==
- Alvan R. Feinstein – Professor of Medicine, Yale University (177th Class)
- Douglas J. Feith – former U.S. Under Secretary of Defense for Policy, a major architect of the 2003 invasion of Iraq (230th Class)
- Norman Fell – actor on Three's Company (176th Class)
- Samuel Simeon Fels – manufacturer, philanthropist (72nd Class)
- Lee Felsenstein – personal computer pioneer and activist (219th Class)
- Louis Filler – historian, writer, and professor at Antioch College (151st Class, 1929)
- Larry Fine – Larry of the Three Stooges (132nd Class)
- Phil Freelon – architect (230th Class)
- Larry Friedman – basketball player
- Phillip Frost – physician, pharmaceuticals executive, philanthropist (200th Class)
- Charles Lewis Fussell – landscape artist (34th Class, 1857)

== G ==
- William Glackens – painter, co-founder of the Ashcan School art movement (92nd Class)
- W. Wilson Goode Jr. – Philadelphia City Councilman at Large, son of former mayor W. Wilson Goode (241st Class)
- E. Urner Goodman – early leader of the Boy Scouts of America (114th Class)
- Oscar Goodman – mayor of Las Vegas, mob defense lawyer (left after 10th grade)
- Charles Goren – bridge player and author (132nd Class)
- Kermit Gosnell – abortion doctor found guilty of murder (211th Class)
- John Trout Greble - Union army officer (1850)
- Shelly Gross – theatrical producer, author (170th Class)
- Richard Grossman – jazz pianist (204th Class)
- Lee Guber – theatrical producer (170th Class)
- Daniel Guggenheim – industrialist and philanthropist (66th Class)
- Simon Guggenheim – industrialist, financier, philanthropist, U.S. Senator for Colorado (87th Class)
- Alfred Guzzetti – documentary and experimental filmmaker and professor of visual and experimental studies at Harvard University (214th Class)

== H ==
- Henry Schell Hagert – District Attorney of Philadelphia
- Eric M. Hammel – military historian, writer and publisher (221st Class)
- Stephen J. Harmelin – White House Aide (1964-1965), Managing Partner, Dilworth, Paxon (206th Class)
- John Harbeson – architect with H2L2 (111th Class)
- Joe Harris – mathematician at Harvard University (232nd Class)
- Joseph Smith Harris – President of the Reading Railroad (24th Class)
- Marvin Haskin - radiologist
- Ari Hoenig – jazz drummer (251st Class)
- Quiara Alegría Hudes – playwright and author (254th Class)

== I ==
- Noel Ignatiev – scholar, historian, and activist (210th Class)
- Albert Innaurato – playwright, theater director, and writer (224th Class)

== J ==
- Major Jackson – poet and professor at Vanderbilt University (245th Class)
- Bushrod Washington James (1836-1903) - surgeon, homeopathist, writer, and philanthropist

== K ==
- Louis Kahn – architect (134th Class)
- Alex Karp – CEO of Palantir Technologies (244th Class)
- Sam Katz – perennial Philadelphia Republican mayoral candidate (226th Class)
- Edward (Ted) Kaufman – U.S. Senator from Delaware (206th Class)
- Charles Keinath – college basketball player and coach
- Alexander Kendrick – broadcast journalist (149th Class)
- Daniel Kevles – historian of science at Yale and California Institute of Technology (205th Class)
- Mark Kramer – jazz pianist, physician-neuroscientist (220th Class)
- Joseph L. Kun – Judge, Philadelphia Court of Common Pleas (106th Class)

== L ==
- Cato T. Laurencin – orthopedic surgeon, professor, chemical engineer (235th Class)
- Conrad C. Lautenbacher – Navy Vice Admiral (213th Class)
- Thomas F. Lewis – member, U.S. House Of Representatives (1942)
- Betty Liu – news anchor for Bloomberg Television (250th Class)
- Alain LeRoy Locke – author, philosopher, first African-American Rhodes Scholar (107th Class)
- Walter P. Lomax, Jr. – physician, philanthropist (192nd Class)
- Jerome Lowenthal – classical pianist, chair of Juilliard School Piano Department (192nd Class)

== M ==
- Lawrence S. Margolis – Judge, United States Court of Federal Claims (199th Class)
- John Marzano – Major League Baseball catcher and broadcast analyst (240th Class)
- Gary K. Michelson – orthopedic spinal surgeon (225th Class)
- Jeffrey Milarsky – conductor of contemporary music (243rd Class)
- Roger M. Milgrim – intellectual property lawyer and treatise author (202nd Class)
- Thomas Francis Miller – architect
- Charles Karsner Mills – neurologist
- James T. Mitchell – Chief Justice of the Supreme Court of Pennsylvania
- Samuel Brown Wylie Mitchell – founder of Phi Kappa Sigma fraternity
- Louis J. Mordell – mathematician at the University of Cambridge (111th Class)
- Joel Myers – founder of AccuWeather (208th Class)

== N ==
- Robert N. C. Nix Jr. – former Chief Justice of the Pennsylvania Supreme Court (186th Class)

== O ==
- Eric Owens – opera singer (247th Class)

== P ==
- Robert E. Pattison – 19th Governor of Pennsylvania (55th Class)
- Thomas May Peirce – founder of Peirce College (32nd Class)
- David Pincus – clothing manufacturer, art collector (181st Class)
- Hilary Putnam – philosopher (182nd Class)

== R ==
- Jed S. Rakoff – United States District Judge for the Southern District of New York (215th Class)
- David Raksin – composer, "Grandfather of Film Music" such as "Laura" (153rd Class)
- Conyers Read – historian (graduated 1899)
- Ralph T. Reed – former CEO of American Express (114th Class)
- William Reed – sprinter (247th Class)
- David L. Reich – academic anesthesiologist and professor; President & Chief Operating Officer of the Mount Sinai Hospital, and President of Mount Sinai Queens (236th Class)
- Shawn Rivera – singer, songwriter, and producer best known for being a member of R&B group Az Yet (251st Class)
- Allen Rosenberg – rower and rowing coach (192nd Class)
- Albert Rosenthal – portrait artist and etcher
- Arnold Roth – cartoonist, humorist (186th Class)
- Leo Stanton Rowe – US Assistant Secretary of the Treasury (89th Class)
- Kal Rudman – Radio and TV pioneer, philanthropist (188th Class)

== S ==
- Shunsuke Sato – world-renowned violinist and conductor (261st Class)
- Morton Livingston Schamberg – modern artist
- Eliot Shorr-Parks – Eagles reporter for 94.1 WIP
- Glenn "Hurricane" Schwartz – meteorologist at the NBC affiliate WCAU in Philadelphia (227th Class)
- Robert Serber – physicist on Manhattan Project (146th Class)
- Joseph Shallit – mystery novelist (156th Class)
- Arthur M. Shapiro – ecologist (220th Class)
- Bree Sharp – singer and songwriter (252nd Class)
- Harry Shuman – Major League Baseball player
- Lee M. Silver – professor of molecular biology, Princeton University (227th Class)
- Richard Bruce Silverman – chemistry professor, inventor of Lyrica (221st Class)
- John French Sloan – painter (92nd Class)
- Henry Slonimsky – professor
- Albert Henry Smyth – History professor and curator of the American Philosophical Society
- Allan Snyder – optical physics, neuroscience, founder of Centre for the Mind (211th Class)
- Dan C Snyder – sculptor and ceramicist (225th Class)
- Lee A. Solomon – New Jersey Supreme Court Justice (230th Class)
- Ben Stahl – labor and civil rights activist
- Julie Stevens – actress, film director and producer (246th Class)
- Frank R. Stockton – writer and humorist (19th Class)
- Charles Stone III – film and ad director (243rd Class)
- Sharif Street – Pennsylvania State Senator (251st Class)

== T ==
- Fred Tappert – professor of physics, University of Miami
- John Baxter Taylor Jr. – track and field athlete, first African-American Olympic gold medalist (107th Class)
- Teller – magician, part of "Penn and Teller" (224th Class)
- Howard Temin – geneticist, shared the 1975 Nobel Prize in Medicine (196th Class)
- Elihu Thomson – inventor, one of the founders of the General Electric Company (55th Class)
- Richard B. Teitelman – judge (223rd Class)
- George Alfred Townsend (1860) – journalist and novelist
- Arthur Tracy – vaudeville performer, singer, actor, known as "The Street Singer" (130th Class)

== V ==
- William Scott Vare – U.S. Congressman (1912-1927), Pennsylvania State Senator (1922-1923), U.S. Senator-Elect (1927-1929), Republican political boss in Philadelphia

== W ==
- Phil Walker – guard on the 1977-1978 NBA champion Washington Bullets (231st Class)
- John Wallowitch – composer, songwriter and cabaret performer (181st Class)
- Louis J. Weichmann – one of the chief witnesses for the prosecution in the conspiracy trial of the Abraham Lincoln assassination
- Andrew Weil – physician, author, proponent of integrative medicine (212th Class)
- Edwin Weinberger – TV producer and writer (204th Class)
- Peter Arrell Browne Widener (1834-1915) - businessman, art collector and patriarch of the wealthy Widener family
- Stephen William White – translator of Jules Verne and secretary of the Northern Central Railway (31st Class)
- R. Seth Williams – District Attorney of Philadelphia (244th Class)
- Alan Wolfe – political scientist and sociologist (213th Class)
- Alexander Woollcott – drama critic for The New Yorker (110th Class)
- Jeremiah Wright – former Senior Pastor of the Trinity United Church of Christ in Chicago (211th Class)
- Ed Wynn (until age 15) – entertainer, actor, comedian, producer (110th Class)

== Y ==
- Charles Yerkes – industrialist and financier (27th Class)
- Will Yip – record producer, songwriter, and musician (264th Class)

== Guide to class numbers ==
Since graduates are usually identified in the school community by class number, the year in which they graduated is not immediately obvious. This section explains the relation between class number and graduation date.

The first class graduated in June 1842. Through much of the school's history, there were two graduating classes per year, in January and June. But in some years, including all years after 1965, there was only one graduating class, in June. The following list details the correspondence between class number and graduation date.

1 June 1842
  2 June 1843
  3 January 1844
  4 June 1844
... 2 classes per year ...
 75 January 1880
 76 June 1880
 77 June 1881
 78 June 1882
 79 January 1883
... 2 classes per year ...
 95 January 1891
 96 June 1891
 97 June 1892
... 1 class per year ...
116 June 1911
117 January 1912
118 June 1912
.... 2 classes per year ...
223 January 1965
224 June 1965
225 June 1966
... 1 class per year ...

Thus, for classes graduating after 1965, the class number equals the graduation year minus 1741.

== See also ==
- Central High School (Philadelphia)
