= Cordelia, California =

Unincorporated community in California, United States

Cordelia
- Unincorporated community
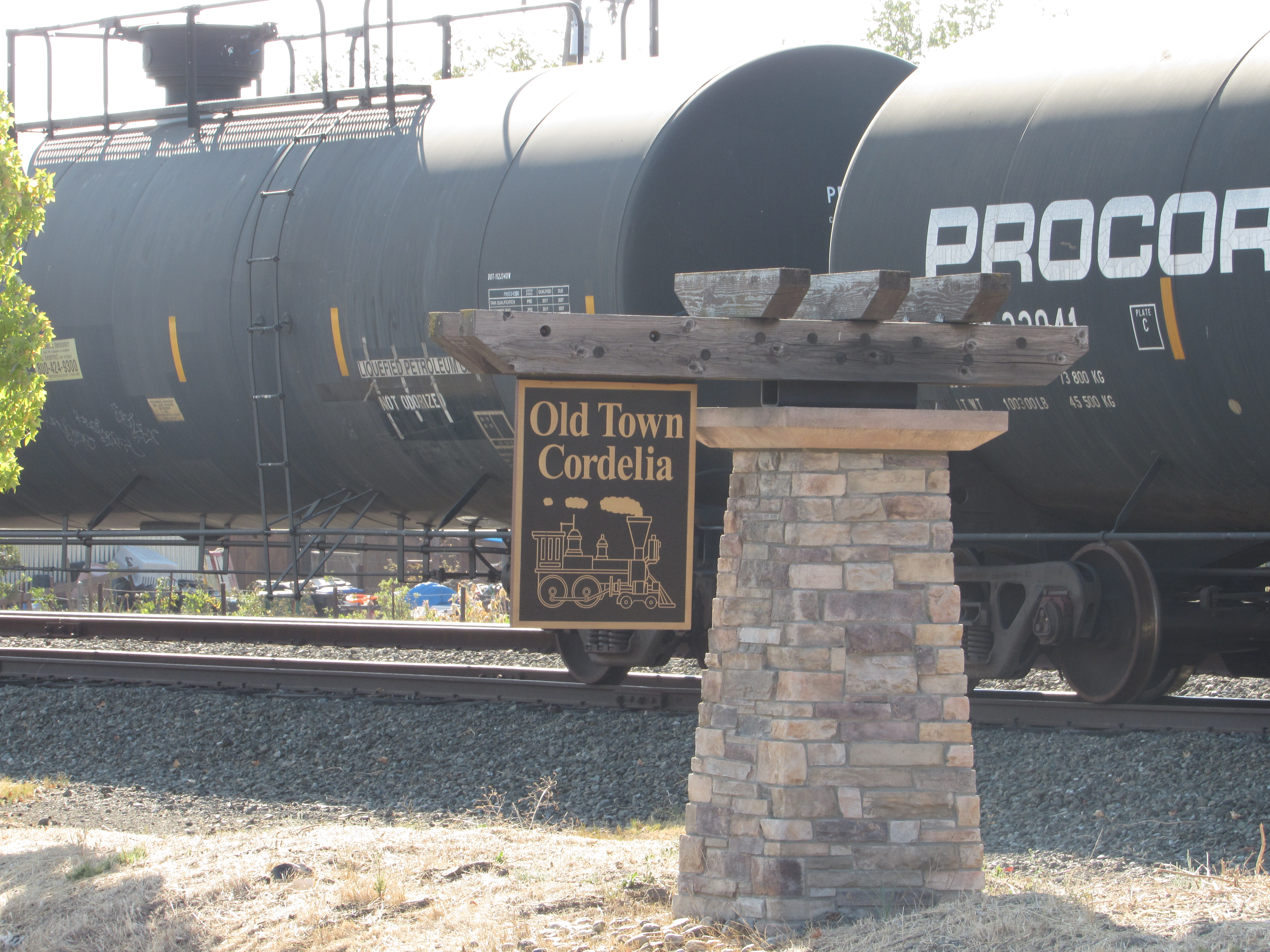
- A train sits behind the Old Town Cordelia sign in Cordelia, California.

- Location within California Location within the United States
- Coordinates: 38°12′38″N 122°08′09″W
- Country: United States
- State: California
- County: Solano
- Metro area: San Francisco Bay Area
- Elevation: 23 ft (7 m)
- Time zone: UTC-8 (Pacific (PST))
  - Summer (DST): UTC-7 (PDT)
- Postal code: 94534
- Area code: 707
- FIPS code: 06-00951
- GNIS feature ID: 218147

Cordelia is an unincorporated community in Solano County, California, United States. Cordelia is located at the junction of Interstate 80 and California State Route 12 and at the northern end of Interstate 680, 7 miles (11 km) west of Fairfield, which has annexed substantial portions of its surroundings.

== History ==
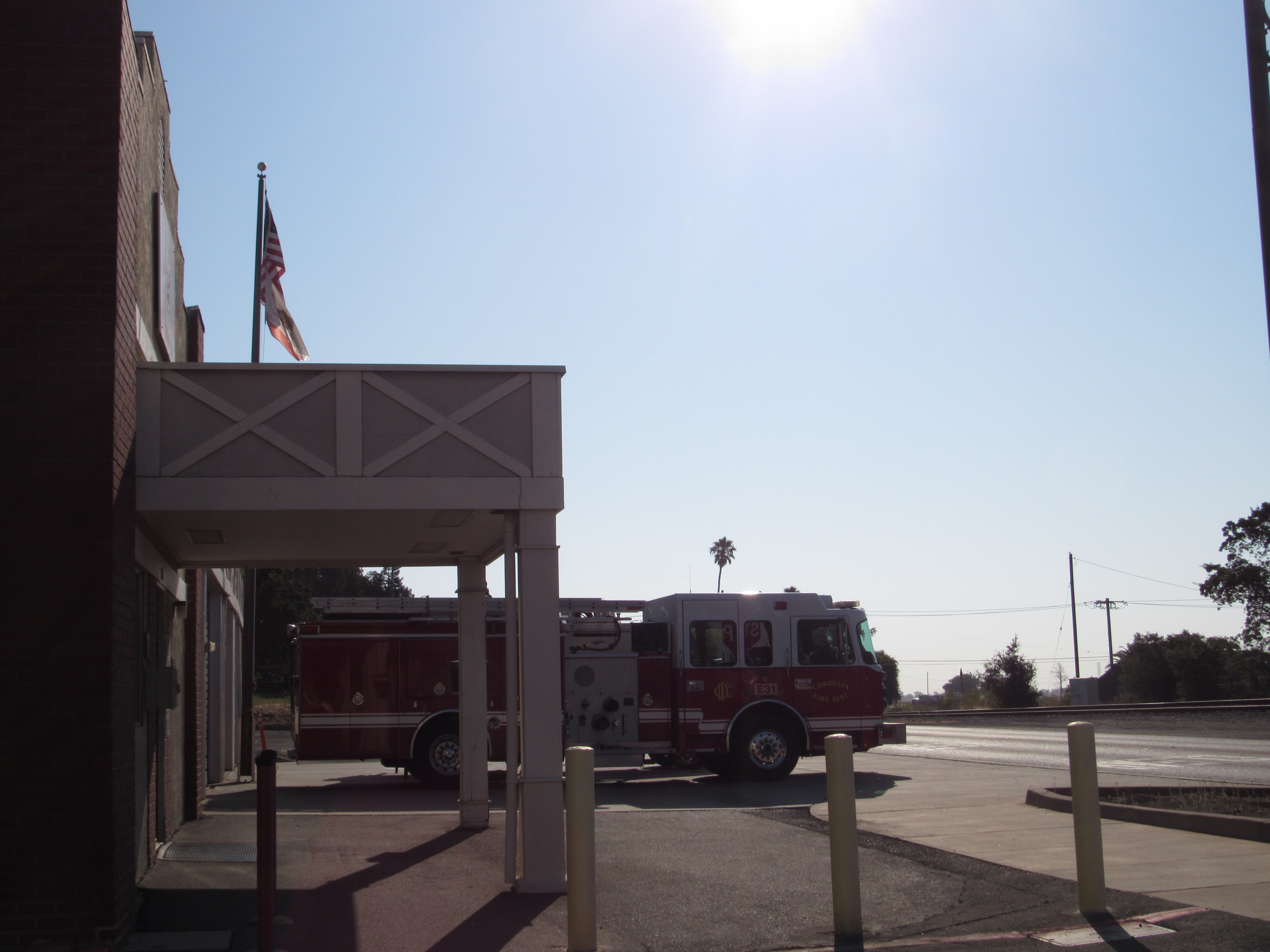
Cordelia Fire Station

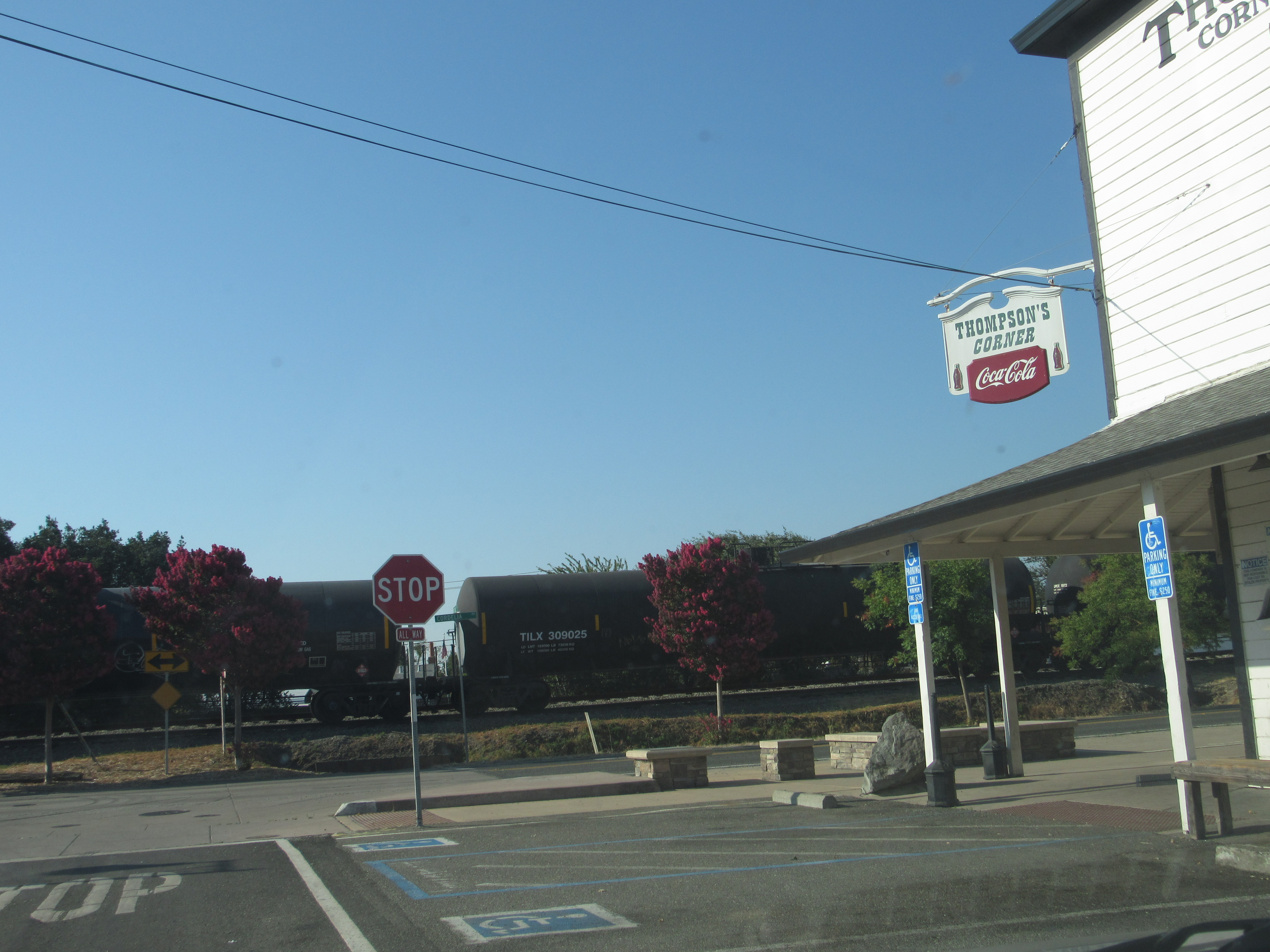
Thompson's Corner Store in Cordelia

The community of Cordelia was founded in 1853 by clipper ship captain Robert H. Waterman, and initially named "Bridgeport" after the Atlantic coastal town of Bridgeport, Connecticut. Around 1869, a post office was established, and the United States Post Office Department declared that a more unique name for the town should be chosen. Waterman, who had also chosen Fairfield for the nearest town to honor his former hometown of Fairfield, Connecticut, then chose "Cordelia", after his wife.

In 1880, the Wells Fargo agency was established in Cordelia.

== Demographics ==
Historical population
Census	Pop.	Note	%±
2020	124		—

The 2020 United States census reported Cordelia had a population of 124. The population density was 306 inhabitants per square mile (118/km^{2}).

Cordelia, California – Racial and ethnic composition Note: the US Census treats Hispanic/Latino as an ethnic category. This table excludes Latinos from the racial categories and assigns them to a separate category. Hispanics/Latinos may be of any race.
Race / Ethnicity (NH = Non-Hispanic)	Pop 2020	% 2020
White alone (NH)	81	65.3%
Black or African American alone (NH)	3	2.4%
Native American or Alaska Native alone (NH)	2	1.6%
Asian alone (NH)	3	2.4%
Other race alone (NH)	0	0.0%
Mixed race or Multiracial (NH)	5	4.0%
Hispanic or Latino (any race)	39	31.4%
Total	124	100.0%

== See also ==
- Cordelia Slough – a 10.8-mile-long (17.4 km) tidal watercourse which discharges to the Suisun Slough, which in turn empties into Grizzly Bay in Solano County, California
- 1999 Loomis truck robbery
