= Niscayah =

Swedish security systems company

Niscayah Group AB (publ)
- Type: Publicly traded Aktiebolag
- Traded as: Nasdaq Stockholm: NISC B
- Industry: Security
- Headquarters: Stockholm, Sweden
- Area served: Europe, United States and Hong Kong
- Products: Access control, video surveillance, intrusion protection and fire alarm systems
- Website: www.niscayah.com

Niscayah was a security systems company based in Stockholm, Sweden, active in 17 countries and first listed at Nasdaq OMX Stockholm, Mid Cap, when it was distributed to the shareholders of Securitas AB in August 2006, under the name of Securitas Systems. In 2008, the name was changed to Niscayah.

In September 2011, Niscayah was purchased by the Stanley Convergent Security Systems division of Stanley Black & Decker for approx. $1.2 billion. It was briefly renamed Niscayah Stanley Security Solutions, but now goes under only the Stanley name. In July 2022 it was sold to Securitas AB for $3.1 billion USD. In 2023 it was renamed Securitas Technology. Stanley Security and Securitas Electronic Security merged together as Securitas Technology. Stanley Healthcare was sold to Securitas AB and renamed Securitas Healthcare.

== History ==
- 1950: Securitas conducts technical operations in support of security operations.
- 1998: Acquisition of Tele Larm AB. Erstwhile Securitas Teknik and TeleLarm forms Securitas Alarm, later changed the name of Securitas Systems.
- 2001: The Systems division formed after Securitas acquired a number of security firms operating in the system. The division had to begin operations in the Nordic countries, France, Spain, Portugal and the United States.
- 2003: Acquisition of Südalarm in Germany (customer portfolio in banking and finance and knowledge in security, turnover 128 million). Restructuring followed by positive results in the operations in the United States.
- 2004: Acquisition of Bell Group plc in the United Kingdom (installation and maintenance of security systems primarily for banks and financial institutions operating in both Europe and the United States, turnover 954 million), Struck & Partner in Germany (security for retail chains, sales 59 million) and Eurotelis in France (supervision of banks, turnover 247 million). With these acquisitions created a deeper understanding of the customer's security needs and an increased presence in the main European markets.
- 2005: Acquisition of Hamilton Pacific in the United States (security solutions for banks, turnover 366 million), Wornall Electronics in United States (safety, turnover 35 million) and Empresa de Servicios Especializados de Seguridad (ESES) in Spain (security systems, and specific fire protection for banks, turnover of 73 million). All acquisitions constituted good grounds for organic growth in each market.
- 2006: Acquisition of Elmaco in Belgium (fire installations for industry and government agencies, turnover 11 million) and Premier Systems Solutions in Florida in the United States (security systems integration, sales MSEK 35). Securitas Systems spun off from Securitas Group and is listed on the Nordic Stock Exchange in September. Acquisition of NOR Security AS in Norway (integration of security systems for police and the judiciary, industry, turnover 17 million).
- 2007: Transformation of the business model, increased organic growth and acquisitions within prioritized customer segments.
- 2008: Securitas Systems AB changes name to Niscayah AB.
- 2011: Niscayah new owners of Stanley Black & Decker, founded in 1843 in New Britain.
- 2012: Changed name to Niscayah Stanley Security Solutions.
