= October 1997 Loomis Fargo robbery =

Robbery in the United States

- Date: October 4, 1997
- Location: Charlotte, North Carolina
- Motive: Theft of $17.3 million
- Target: Loomis, Fargo & Co.
- Outcome: 88% of the stolen money recovered
- Convicted: 24 people

On the evening of October 4, 1997, $17.3 million in cash was stolen from the Charlotte, North Carolina, regional office vault of Loomis, Fargo & Co. The robbery was committed by Loomis vault supervisor David Scott Ghantt, his married girlfriend Kelly Campbell (a former Loomis co-worker), Steven Eugene Chambers (a one-time FBI informant), his wife Michelle Chambers, Michael Gobbies, and four other co-conspirators. An FBI criminal investigation ultimately resulted in the arrest and conviction of eight people directly involved in the heist, as well as sixteen others who had indirectly helped them, and the recovery of approximately 88% of the stolen money.

This robbery was the second-largest cash robbery on U.S. soil at the time, as only seven months earlier, on March 29, 1997, in Jacksonville, Florida, Philip Noel Johnson stole $18.8 million from the Loomis Fargo armored vehicle he was driving.

== Company ==
Although the history of the predecessor Wells Fargo & Company dates back to 1852, Loomis Fargo & Company was established in 1997 by the consolidation of Wells Fargo Armored Service and Loomis Armored Inc.; the resulting corporation employed 8,500 people and provided armored transportation, cash handling services, and ATM maintenance. Its Charlotte office would be the victim of David Scott Ghantt and his confederates later that year.

== Planning ==
David Ghantt (born 1969) struck up a relationship with fellow Loomis Fargo employee Kelly Campbell, and they continued to maintain contact even after Campbell left the company. In August 1997, Campbell informed Ghantt of an old high school friend of hers, Steve Chambers, who could assist Ghantt in executing a massive cash robbery of the Loomis Fargo vault in one night. Chambers had broached the possibility of a robbery to Campbell the summer before.

The plan was for Ghantt to commit the robbery and then quickly leave the country for Mexico – but to leave the bulk of the cash with Chambers. Chambers would then occasionally wire Ghantt money and see to his basic financial needs; when "the heat was off," Ghantt was to re-enter the U.S. and the money would be split up among all of the co-conspirators.

== Heist ==
With the plan in place, Ghantt sent a newly employed co-worker home early (reportedly at 6 p.m) who had been assigned to train with him. He then proceeded to load about $17.3 million in cash (approximately $11 million of which was in $20 bills) into the back of a company van.

Outside the building, Ghantt met up with Campbell, Chambers, and others who were involved in the plot, and drove off to a printing business called Reynolds & Reynolds in northwest Charlotte. From there, the money was moved from the company vehicle to private vehicles. Then, keeping with the plan, Ghantt took $50,000 (the maximum that could by law be taken across the border without further authorization) with him and left for Mexico, winding up at the popular Yucatan Peninsula resort-island of Cozumel.

== FBI investigation ==
=== Ghantt as the prime suspect ===
Loomis Fargo employees could not open the vault the next morning and called the police. The police then called the FBI because most of the money handled at the facility belonged to banks, which technically made it a bank robbery — a federal offense.

Investigators considered Ghantt to be the prime suspect almost from the beginning. He was the only employee unaccounted for the next morning, and videotapes recovered at the Loomis Fargo Charlotte office showed Ghantt removing "cubes of cash" and loading it into a Loomis Fargo armored van for over an hour. Two days later, when the FBI found the Loomis Fargo armored van, they discovered almost $3.3 million in cash left in the back of the van; it was later discovered that the thieves had miscalculated the sheer bulk of the small denomination currency, and that they simply left the cash that they could not take with them in the back of the van. Investigators also found Ghantt's pickup truck, abandoned at the warehouse. Inside the truck, they found Ghantt's ring and surmised this was a sign of Ghantt's intention to end his relationship with his wife.

Although the FBI investigation was able to quickly connect Ghantt to Campbell, connecting Ghantt to Chambers was a more difficult task. Tips had led the FBI to begin monitoring Chambers' (and his wife's) activities, but it was not until the FBI recorded a phone call from Ghantt in Mexico that the final connection was made. By then, the FBI had become greatly concerned for Ghantt's personal safety; they had learned that Chambers had plotted to have Ghantt killed in a murder for hire scheme using a "hit man" named Michael McKinney.

The FBI investigation was aided by the gang's extravagant spending. They had initially agreed to control their spending for a year or two, in the belief that the government would vigorously track the spending habits of any and all suspects for at least a year before relenting.

Chambers had no intention of following those rules, believing the FBI would never connect him to Ghantt. He and his wife, Michelle, moved from their mobile home in Lincoln County to a luxury house in the wealthy Cramer Mountain section of Cramerton. They kept several furnishings from the previous owners, including a painting of Elvis Presley on black velvet. They also bought a BMW Z3 with cash and made several large purchases, including a $600 cigar store Indian. Campbell used part of her share of the money to buy a Toyota Sienna minivan in two cash installments.

An additional tip reached the FBI when Michelle Chambers made a large deposit at a bank. She had previously been making frequent small deposits to avert suspicion. But after one visit, when she asked a teller "How much can I deposit before you have to report it to the feds?" followed by "Don't worry, it is not drug money," the bank filled out a suspicious activity report, which ultimately reached the FBI.

Ghantt's spending in Mexico was extravagant at first. He stayed in a luxury hotel and paid for expensive food and activities such as scuba diving and parasailing. Ghantt reported to Chambers that his supply of money was running low, but Chambers sent Ghantt just $8,000. Ghantt, in order to conserve this money, curtailed his spending. He also took various measures to change his appearance, such as shaving, after a patron at a restaurant pointed out to him that he "looked like the man who robbed a bank of $20 million."

=== Arrests, trials, and convictions ===
After successfully tracing Ghantt's phone call, FBI agents coordinated with Mexican police to arrest Ghantt on March 1, 1998, at Playa del Carmen, a city near Cancun. The next day, Steve and Michelle Chambers, Kelly Campbell, and four others were arrested.

On March 12, a Charlotte grand jury indicted the eight co-conspirators for bank larceny and money laundering; the latter offense was included because of how they spent the stolen money.

Nine other relatives and friends were also charged with money laundering, as they had co-signed for safe deposit boxes used to store some of the money; prosecutors opted to charge them on the grounds that they should have known the money was obtained illegally. On similar grounds, four other people were ultimately also charged with money laundering.

All but one of the defendants pleaded guilty. They received sentences ranging from probation for the safe deposit box buyers to 11 years and three months in federal prison for Steve Chambers, who was also fined more than $3,500,000. The only defendant not to plead guilty, Chambers' attorney Jeff Guller, was found guilty of money laundering and sentenced to eight years in prison. By comparison, Ghantt served seven years in prison and was fined $26,000. He was released in 2006. Michelle Chambers received a harsher sentence than Ghantt — seven years and eight months — because she had violated several bond conditions.

The defendants were the targets of many barbed jokes in Charlotte and across the country, in part because of their extravagant spending. For a time, it was nicknamed "the hillbilly heist" because nearly all of the major players in the case came from small towns around Charlotte.

It was later confirmed by the FBI that more than 88% of the stolen cash had been located or otherwise accounted for. More than $2 million is still missing to this day.

=== Chambers released from prison ===
Steven Chambers finished serving his sentence in November 2006. In February 2009 the Associated Press reported that Chambers had chosen to describe himself as "changed".

== Media portrayals ==
=== Books ===
- The robbery was the subject of the book Heist!: The $17 Million Loomis Fargo Theft (ISBN 0895872528) by Jeff Diamant (published September 2002). Diamant was a Charlotte Observer newspaper reporter working in their Gaston County bureau when the theft took place.
- Overcoming the mindset that led to the part David Ghantt played in the Loomis robbery and how he started on a new path was the subject of the book The Book of Dave: A New Path After a $17 Million Misstep (ISBN 9781726492737) by David Scott Ghantt (published October 2018). David Ghantt was the vault supervisor in the 1997 Loomis Fargo robbery.

=== Television and film ===
- Within days of the robbery, the case was depicted on the television criminal reporting show America's Most Wanted episode which aired on October 11, 1997. Ghantt's wife ended the segment with a plea to her then-husband, "Please, if there's any way possible, call us or the FBI and let us know you are alive and well... And remember, David, no matter what, we do love you."
- An expanded two-hour special episode of the crime documentary series The FBI Files, titled "The Unperfect Crime", distributed by The Discovery Channel, first aired in 2001.
- A comedy film based on the events, Masterminds, was filmed in 2014 and released on September 29, 2016. It was written by Emily Spivey, directed by Jared Hess, and stars Zach Galifianakis as Ghantt, Kristen Wiig as Campbell, Owen Wilson as Chambers, and Jason Sudeikis as McKinney.
- In 2020, the television show Super Heists portrayed the heist in Episode 3, "Van Full of Dollars". David Ghantt was portrayed by Zackary Hatfield.

=== Radio ===
Rocket Science, a 1998 double-disc album by Charlotte-based radio personalities John Boy & Billy, includes a track ("Marvin: The Loomis Caper") mocking the defendants.

== See also ==
- List of large-value US robberies
- Criminal conspiracy
- Dunbar Armored robbery
