= Howard L. Clark Sr. =

American businessman

- Born: 1916; South Pasadena, California
- Died: February 2, 2001 (aged 84–85); Greenwich, Connecticut
- Education: Stanford University Columbia Business School Harvard Law School

Howard Longstreth Clark Sr. (1916 – February 2, 2001) was chief executive officer of American Express from 1960 to 1977. Howard L. Clark Jr. is his son.

Business positions
Preceded by Ralph Reed	CEO of American Express; 1960–1977	Succeeded by James D. Robinson III
