= Ralph Reed (American Express) =

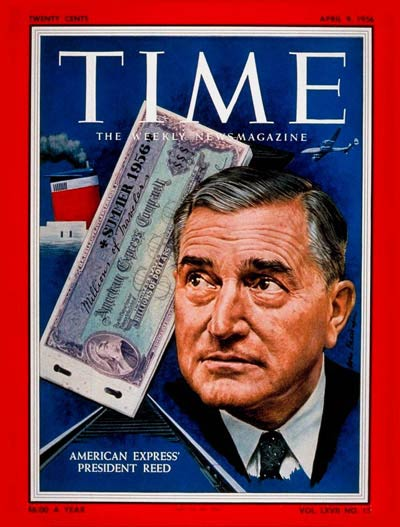
Ralph Reed on the cover of Time (April 9, 1956)

Ralph Thomas Reed (July 6, 1890, Philadelphia – January 21, 1968, New York City) was the president of the American Express Company from 1944 to 1960. He joined the company in 1919 as assistant to the controller. He was the person who made the decision to create the American Express charge card, first issued in 1958.

== Biography ==
He was born on July 6, 1890 in Philadelphia, to William Arter and Jennie Smith Reed. He was raised in Philadelphia, the second son of a Welsh-born lumber company accountant. He won a scholarship to Princeton, but dropped out when his father became unemployed. Reed got an accounting job, and at night, began attending Wharton School. In 1915, he graduated from the Wharton School of the University of Pennsylvania.

He joined American Express as assistant to the controller in 1919. From 1944 to 1960 he was president of American Express. TIME magazine in 1956 described Reed, as Amex president, as the "businessman who first applied to foreign travel all the ingenuity and resources of U.S. industry," stating he had done "more than anyone else in the world to lure the American abroad and make his trip a success." In his twelve years as president, he had increased the company's offices from 50 to 344, increased employees from 1,500 to 8,600, and saw a 318% increase in total assets, at $621 million. He also saw the implementation of Amex programs intended to make travel easier and cheaper for Americans, including trip planning services, and detective services to find traveling family members and missing items. TIME noted his personal proclivity for lavish international travel and tipping, and that he once "rented the entire first floor of London’s Hotel Savoy to entertain 500 cocktail guests." Reed approved the first Amex card, which appeared in 1958. He was succeeded as president of Amexco in 1960 by Howard L. Clark. He was chairman of the executive committee of Amex from 1960 to 1965, when he retired.

He was on the advisory committee of the Foreign Service Institute of the United States State Department and was also an adviser to the Voice of America. President Dwight D. Eisenhower appointed him the US representative at the inauguration of the President of Nicaragua in 1957.

He was married to Edna May Young, and their daughter was named Phyllis Ann Reed. A resident of New York City and Palm Beach, Ralph T. Reed died at Roosevelt Hospital in New York in January 1968 after falling ill, at the age of 77.

== Boards and committees ==
He was a director of the Western Union Telegraph Company, the American International Life Assurance Company of New York, the First National Bank of West Palm Beach, Florida, and the Lafayette Fellowship Foundation of Philadelphia.

He was on the board of the directors of the American Cancer Society, a trustee of the American School of Classical Studies in Athens, a trustee of Roosevelt Hospital, and a trustee of the United States Trust Company of New York.

== See also ==
- List of Central High School (Philadelphia) alumni

Business positions
Preceded by Frederick P. Small (1923–1944)	CEO of American Express; 1944–1960	Succeeded by Howard L. Clark Sr.
