= MOV =

MOV may refer to:

- MOV (x86 instruction), a mnemonic for the copying of data from one location to another in the x86 assembly language
- .mov, filename extension for the QuickTime multimedia file format
- Metal oxide varistor, an electronic component with a significant non-ohmic current-voltage characteristic
- Marconi-Osram Valve, a former British manufacturer of vacuum tubes
- The Merchant of Venice, a play by William Shakespeare
- MOV (TV channel), a Portuguese television channel operated by NOS
- Member of the Order of the Volta, one of the highest national awards of Ghana
- MOV (album), a 1999 album by R&B group Men of Vizion
- Motor-operated valve, a style of valve actuator for controlling flow in pipes
- MOV, an abbreviation of mother of vinegar, the colony of yeast and bacteria in a bottle of vinegar
- Moranbah Airport, IATA airport code "MOV"
- Moshassuck Valley Railroad, reporting mark MOV
