= 2022 Brink's theft =

2022 jewelry theft

2022 Brinks theft
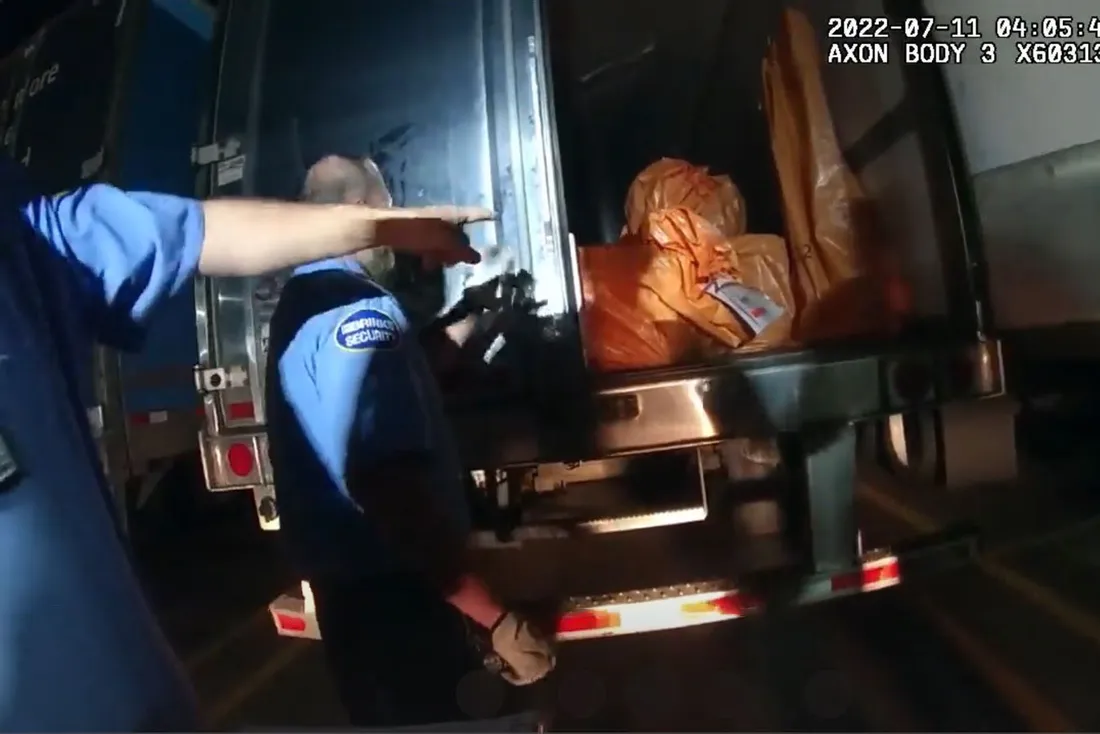
- Image taken by Los Angeles County deputy sheriffs inspecting the ransacked truck
- Date: July 11, 2022
- Time: 2–2:30 a.m. (Pacific Time)
- Location: Lebec, California, United States; 34.8156°N 118.8890°W
- Type: Jewelry theft
- Property damage: $8.7–100 million in jewelry stolen
- Accused: 7

At 2 a.m. on July 11, 2022, a Brink's truck driver carrying jewelry between jewelry shows in the U.S. state of California stopped at a Flying J truck stop near Lebec, north of Los Angeles. During this period, almost a third of the jewelry bags they had been transporting were stolen. It is believed, due to the amount of jewelry stolen in such a short time, that there were several people involved. Some of the jewelers believe that the theft was an inside job, or at least that Brink's may know more than it has publicly disclosed. Several experts stated that it would be unlikely that any of the stolen jewelry will be recovered because the stolen metals can be melted down and recast. Additionally, identifying marks on the stones can be eliminated by jewelers working with thieves.

Brink's estimated that $8.7 million in jewelry had been stolen and promised to reimburse the affected jewelers. Some of the jewelers have sued the company. They have admitted in depositions that they, like many of their colleagues, routinely understated the value of the jewelry being transported on manifests they filed with Brink's, in order to keep their insurance costs down to a level where their businesses can be profitable. They have accused Brink's of negligently failing to properly secure the truck, since the rear doors had a simple padlock and security seal. Brink's in turn has sued to limit the payout to the declared value of the jewelry, accusing the jewelers of breach of contract. Estimates of its true value have reached $100 million, which would make it one of the largest jewelry thefts in modern American history and among the ten largest ever. The loss has effectively forced some of the jewelers to close their businesses and leave the industry.

In 2025, seven alleged co-conspirators in the theft were indicted. The FBI had established that they had worked together on several previous thefts in San Bernardino County, following delivery trucks and then stealing from the trailers when they were parked, usually at truck stops. Some of the stolen jewelry has been recovered. Attorneys representing the jewelers in their case against Brink's say the details of the crime further prove the company's negligence.

== Background ==
On the afternoon of July 10, 2022, jewelers exhibiting their wares at the International Gem & Jewelry Show, a traveling event, were getting ready to close up and pack after three days at the San Mateo County Event Center in the San Francisco Bay Area. A large amount of jewelry business is transacted at these shows. Many sellers buy from makers "on memo", a consignment arrangement where they do not have to pay the maker until the piece actually sells, requiring considerable personal trust. Items on offer at San Mateo ranged from decorative beads to rare Rolex watches.

Due to the valuable merchandise readily accessible, jewelry shows and those who sell at them are vigilant for possible thieves, usually those attempting smash and grabs. Public-address announcements regularly remind all present to report any suspicious behavior they see to security. On that day, one jeweler present later recalled, the announcements seemed more frequent and specific than usual, mentioning the presence of "suspicious individuals on site". The show's manager, Brandy Swanson, chased a man wearing a surgical mask and earpiece who had been sitting on a folding chair watching jewelers pack up after the show ended, when all members of the public were no longer allowed in, and had him escorted out of the event center after he claimed not to be able to speak English in response to her questions. He was met outside by a similarly masked man and the two left together.

Swanson said she informed two workers from Brink's about the encounter, who seemed unconcerned; the company later denied receiving any information about this or any other suspicious individuals or behavior from show personnel. The Brink's personnel at the show would be transporting bags of jewelry to the next show in Pasadena. Since many of the jewelers were traveling with goods worth millions of dollars, they contracted with the company to handle them rather than using their own cars for the merchandise.

James Beaty and Tandy Motley, the two Brink's guards who would drive the jewelry bags to Pasadena, began loading the 73 bags, weighing 70–100 pounds (32–45 kg) each, all identically wrapped in orange plastic with no indication as to what was inside, save a color-coded tag supposedly representing the cash value of the contents, into a tractor trailer. The company used that for the shipment rather than its armored cars since it could put all the bags in one vehicle. The cab was armored, while the trailer was not; Beaty and Motley were both armed.

While loading, Beaty and Motley both noticed a man watching them intently from a nearby vehicle; they are not sure if it was the same man. Neither of the drivers challenged them because they were not sure of their suspicions; however Motley informed both his fellow Brink's employees and Swanson. Others present also reported suspicious activity. One dealer who had stepped outside for a break saw a vehicle with heavy tint on all its windows, even the windshield, and no license plates. When he tried to take a picture, it drove away. Security also found another man, also with an earpiece, wearing sunglasses and a baseball cap, loitering near the loading area. Asked to leave, he drove off in a Dodge Charger; they were able to photograph it.

Beaty and Motley say that no one advised them to take any extra precautions on the trip to Pasadena. After loading the truck and locking it up, with a single padlock and plastic security seal on the rear doors, they began the 370-mile (600 km) drive shortly before 8:30 p.m. Before it left, Beaty had gone into the sleeper in the rear of the cab to get the 10 hours' rest mandated by federal hours of service regulations before he could drive the truck again.

== Theft ==
At 2 a.m., having driven almost 300 miles (480 km) nonstop down Interstate 5 since leaving San Mateo, Motley pulled off the highway at the Frazier Mountain Park Road exit just south of the small town of Lebec, where I-5 climbs through Tejon Pass. A short distance to the west, he turned into a Flying J truck stop on the south side of the road, just over the Los Angeles County line. Motley parked the truck and went inside to get something to eat, leaving Beaty asleep in the cab.

Motley returned almost a half hour later and, per company protocol, inspected the vehicle. He saw that the seal at the rear had been broken and the padlock cut away. Other than that, he noticed nothing unusual. Motley woke Beaty up and the two checked the trailer. It appeared some of the bags had been taken. They called the company and then notified the Los Angeles County Sheriff's Department, which sent deputies to the scene to take a report and investigate. At their behest, the drivers counted the bags and determined that 24 of the 73 bags had been taken, mostly from the front of the trailer, harder to reach from the rear. Brink's would later claim that 22 were taken.

== Investigation ==
Recounting the night's events to deputies, the drivers made some statements that have been described as questionable and contradictory. They said they had left San Mateo at midnight, which if true would have meant Motley had driven the truck at an average speed of 150 mph (240 km/h); in later depositions, they gave their departure time as 8:25 p.m. Motley said he left Beaty sleeping in the truck when he went to eat because his mandated 10 hours of rest had not expired. Had he awakened his codriver to stand guard outside the truck, he would thus have been legally unable to finish the drive to Pasadena afterwards. But Beaty said he had gone into the sleeper at 3:39 p.m. the preceding afternoon, which if true meant that he had gotten legally adequate rest by the time Motley pulled into the Flying J lot, as Motley has admitted in a subsequent deposition. They told the deputies they believed that they had been followed from San Mateo, although they had not seen anyone doing so.

Deputies also could not resolve another contradiction. Some of the bags, in addition to their colored tags, had "LAX" marked on them. After calling the Brink's guard who had packed most of the bags in San Mateo, Beaty confirmed that meant those bags were to be taken to Los Angeles International Airport instead of Pasadena. Beaty told the deputy that the guard thought that those were the ones the thieves had been after as they had the highest value goods in them. The deputy noted that he was at that moment standing next to a bag with "LAX" on it; the matter did not appear to have been explored further at that time.

The truck stop's security cameras only cover the fueling area, not the section of the lot where the truck was parked, so there was no direct footage of the theft. The LACSD has been reported to have other relevant camera footage from the truck stop. Witnesses in the area at the time were able to give law enforcement one possible lead. One man nearby during the time the theft occurred said he overheard some men talking in a foreign language. He could not say what it was but he could say that it was not Spanish, as he was familiar with it. The thieves seem to have taken the broken lock with them, but left the seal on the ground near the truck.

Months after the theft, the Los Angeles Times reported on an exchange captured on bodycam footage it was able to review a transcript of. One of the investigating deputies stepped away from interviewing Beaty and Motley to take a phone call from his superior. He emphasized to her that he was making sure to be out of their earshot before speaking to her. She then asked if he thought "they were totally victimized", at which point the transcript indicated that the recording had ended.

Eight months after the theft, police said they had served some search warrants to look at records at some properties, but did not comment further on the case. The FBI has joined the investigation but has not commented on the case.

== Theories ==
Investigators reportedly agreed with Beaty and Motley that the thieves followed the trucks from San Mateo and waited for a moment to strike rather than it being a crime of opportunity for perpetrators loitering in the truck stop parking lot looking for a lightly secured or unsecured truck. Beaty and Motley were openly carrying firearms, which may also have indicated a high-value cargo to thieves. They and the deputies also noted that most of the bags the thieves took were stored near the front of the trailer, suggesting the thieves had specific ones in mind, rather than the easier task of taking as many bags as they could from the rear in the limited amount of time they had.

The speed with which the thieves took the bags also argues for a planned operation involving several people, since it is unlikely a single person could have taken that many heavy bags from the truck and loaded them into another vehicle in the 27 minutes during which the theft occurred. Former jewel thief Larry Lawton says the operation was very likely carefully planned.

That planning, Lawton added, would have included disposing of the jewelry. Thieves stealing this much jewelry would probably very quickly take it to jewelers working with them to use chemical agents to separate stones and metal, melt down the metals for resale in bulk and remove any identifying marks, such as the ten-digit IDs etched on stones authenticated by the Gemological Institute of America (GIA) from the jewels themselves. (Note: However, a GIA spokesman told the Los Angeles Times, it would be easy to see where a previous ID number had been removed if the stone is resubmitted for authentication, as long as the stone had not been sufficiently cut down in weight.) They could then be taken to a center of the industry such as Antwerp—or New York or Miami if thieves did not want to risk customs discovering the stolen goods—and be sold quickly. Such arrangements, if taken, were probably also planned in advance.

Other sources connected to the case believed otherwise, that the thieves were waiting until interest in the case fades to return the jewels to the market. Some have been rumored to have been shipped to Israel in the meantime.

=== Possibility of inside job ===
There have been accusations, due to the planning likely involved and the nonpublic information the thieves seem to have had, that the theft was an inside job perpetrated by someone tipped off by the company. One of the victimized jewelers did not learn of the theft until after their wares were not among those unloaded at Pasadena. The local Brink's office told them nothing about what had happened, and only two days later did the company send him and other jewelers a letter vaguely referring to a "loss incident". Another affected jeweler, Jean Malki, found it to be excessively coincidental that the thieves knew details of the truck's journey ahead of time, while Motley, in turn, speculated to deputies on the night of the theft that one or more of the jewelers might have used the same information to perpetrate insurance fraud.

== Indictments ==
In June 2025 federal prosecutors in the Central District of California announced that they had secured indictments against seven men from the Los Angeles area (one of whom was serving time on an unrelated burglary charge in an Arizona prison) on charges of conspiracy to commit theft from interstate and foreign shipment and theft from interstate and foreign shipment that included other thefts from trucks. Five were additionally charged with Hobbs Act violations and additional conspiracy and theft counts. Two were arrested and appeared in court the day the indictment was announced; some of the stolen jewelry was found when their houses were searched.

The indictment, reviewed by The Los Angeles Times, alleges that prior to the Brinks theft the men had worked together to steal shipments of electronics from delivery trucks in the Fontana and Ontario areas in San Bernardino County. They used tactics similar to those in the Brinks theft: some would follow the truck in personal vehicles, alerting the others by phone to when the truck would stop at a parking lot. Once there, others would act as lookouts while a third group broke into the truck and stole electronic devices worth thousands of dollars. They would then take the stolen goods to fences in East Los Angeles and split the proceeds among themselves.

After the Brinks theft, the men went to East Hollywood. They may not have realized at first just how valuable their haul was. Several deactivated their phones in the weeks afterward. A lawyer for the jewelers says the account of the crime in the indictment "confirms what we've been saying all along, that this was a serious criminal enterprise that exploited the vulnerabilities of Brink's' security protocols." Brinks thanked law enforcement for its efforts."

== Litigation ==
Brink's had fixed the value of the stolen jewelry at $8.7 million based on the information given by the jewelers on forms they or representatives had signed and filed with the carrier for insurance purposes. It promised, per its contracts with them, to reimburse them for the full value. But media reports began circulating that the true value of the jewelry was much higher, closer to $100 million by some estimates. In early August the company filed suit against the jewelers in federal court in New York, accusing them of breach of contract and seeking to limit the payment to the jewelry's declared value.

In its court filings, Brink's made public the circumstances of the theft: that one of its drivers had parked a trailer, secured only with a padlock, filled with millions of dollars in jewelry, in a dark corner of a remote truck stop parking lot to eat while the other slept in the cab. The jewelers, incredulous at what seemed to them to be weak and lax security, filed a separate suit two weeks later, in state court in Los Angeles, alleging negligence on the company's part, asking $200 million in damages.

A central issue in both suits was that, as Brink's had intimated when filing its action, the jewelers routinely undervalued their merchandise on the forms they filed with the company. In depositions, several admitted to willfully doing so. Malki, Brink's said, had called it a "business decision", since many of the jewelers were small operators, often sole proprietorships, who were unable to afford the higher insurance charges Brink's would have assessed had they given accurate valuations of their jewelry. A spokeswoman for Brink's stated that they would have implemented appropriate security measures had the jewelers given accurate transport values, prompting the jewelers' lawyer to enquire as to how valuable the goods would have needed to be to have been adequately secured.

Three of the 14 plaintiffs in the jewelers' suit have settled with Brink's for undisclosed sums. Some also sued Flying J's parent company, arguing under a premises liability claim that with a history of theft incidents related to the truck stop over the previous six years it should have been more security-conscious. In February 2024 the judge hearing the case sustained the demurrer Flying J filed, arguing that the incidents enumerated were not similar enough to the Brink's theft for Flying J to have reasonably been able to foresee it. He granted the plaintiffs 30 days to file an amended complaint after their lawyer said he had just learned of a similar incident where a driver returning to his truck had found the door open and people milling around in the back.

== Impact ==
The jewelers who sued Brink's were among those who lost the most valuable merchandise in the theft. Many had built up their inventories, including some highly valuable pieces, over 40 years. Many operators lost their entire livelihoods. For those who have continued in the business, other difficulties remain. Brink's is refusing to transport their goods while the lawsuit is pending, and its dominance of the secured transportation sector has left other jewelers who are not suing unwilling to criticize the company on the record. Some of the jewelry makers who sell to them are now demanding payment up front rather than on consignment. Malki observed that his post-theft showcases were less full than before.

== See also ==
- Crime in California
- 1999 Loomis truck robbery, theft of cash from a truck in transit in California, also still unsolved
