= March 1997 Loomis Fargo robbery =

- Date: March 29, 1997
- Location: Jacksonville, Florida
- Type: Bank robbery
- Motive: Theft of $18.8 million
- Target: Loomis Fargo & Company
- Convicted: Philip Noel Johnson
- Sentence: 25 years imprisonment

Philip Noel Johnson (born 1964) is a former armored car driver employed by Loomis Fargo & Company in Jacksonville, Florida. He is notable for the theft of 18.8 million dollars, at the time the largest heist ever pulled off.

== Robbery ==
On March 29, 1997, Johnson pulled off what was then the largest cash heist in U.S. history, taking $18.8 million ($29.2 million today) from the armored vehicle he was driving. Johnson overpowered two of his co-workers and left them handcuffed in different locations. He stashed most of the $18.8 million in a storage shed in Mountain Home, North Carolina, and moved to Mexico City.

On August 30, 1997, a U.S. Customs Agent at a border crossing from Mexico pulled a passenger from a bus bound for Houston, Texas, suspicious of his responses to her questions. Upon further investigation the agent found the identification offered by the passenger to be a known alias for Johnson, and he was arrested when multiple passports were found in his possession.

Independent of Johnson's apprehension, investigators were already following a trail of clues that led to the North Carolina storage shed on September 18, 1997. Approximately $18 million was recovered from the shed. Johnson was subsequently convicted and sentenced to 25 years in prison.

Johnson was released from prison October 3, 2019.

The robbery was featured in an episode of Daring Capers.

== See also ==
- List of large value US robberies
