= PCQuest (magazine) =

Indian technology publication

- Group Editor: Thomas George
- Former editors: L Subramanian, Prasanto Kumar Roy, Krishna Kumar, Anil Chopra
- Categories: Computer
- Frequency: monthly
- Publisher: Pradeep Gupta
- Founded: 1982
- Company: Cyber Media India Limited
- Country: India
- Based in: New Delhi
- Language: English
- Website: Official website

PCQuest is an Indian technology publication, and part of the Cyber Media group of publications that also publish Dataquest.

== History and profile ==
First published in July 1987, the magazine was originally called PC World, and was one of the earliest technology magazines published in India. It was later renamed to PC Quest and then again to its current name, PCQuest (without the space).

== PCQ Online BBS ==
In 1994, PCQuest launched India's first attempt by an Indian publication to create an online, interactive service for its readers, by setting up a BBS.

== PCQ Labs ==
To support its sister publications, as well as external entities requiring such services, PCQuest formed PCQ Labs in 1994. The charter of PCQ Labs was to do technology and product reviews, investigate new technologies, and document them for readers. The labs has been renamed to Cybermedia Labs.

== PCQ Cover CD/DVD ==
In 1995, PCQuest became the first Indian publication to include a cover CD, a CD-ROM that carried supplementary information, software and other material. With permission from IBM, the first cover CD carried a fully functional copy of OS/2 Warp 4.

== PCQ Linux Initiative ==
In March 1996, PCQuest launched its PCQuest Linux Initiative. The initiative included the publication of an annual Linux distribution on the cover CD as well as technical articles about Linux and other Open Source technologies. This has resulted in the distribution of close to a million Linux CD-ROMS in India since 1996. For many people in India, this became the primary source of Linux distributions.

Since 2001, the PCQuest customized Linux CD distribution has been called PCQLinux. The last PCQLinux was published in 2009 after a user poll concluded that the CD distribution was not useful to urban users, as a consequence of improvements in broadband Internet access.

PCQuest has published "Linux Specials" every year since 1996, except in 1997 and 2001, when it published two such special issues.

== Content ==
PCQuest initially did not retain dedicated writing staff. In late 1992, then-editor Prasanto Kumar Roy initiated a new approach, by sourcing much of PCQuest's content from technology industry writers, contributors and enthusiasts. Over the years, these writers included names such as Atul Chitnis, Kishore Bhargava, Ashish Gulhati, Rishab Aiyer Ghosh, Vipul Ved Prakash, Varun Jaitly and others. Subsequently, PCQuest built up the first magazine owned test and review facility for IT products in India with Krishna Kumar joining to setup PCQLabs. PCQ labs built up a strong team of internal reviewers and analysts including Vinod Unny, Nikhil Dutta, Sanjay Majumder, Anindya Roy, Shekhar Govindarajan and many more.

In 1999, Krishna Kumar became the editor of PCQuest and started repositioning the magazine in the enterprise technology implementation space.

Today, most of the content is created by a team of in-house technology analysts.

== Video ==
In 2005 PCQuest started experimenting with producing a video on technologies and products that was carried in the cover mounted CD/DVD. In 2006, this became a regular feature of about 25–30 minutes that is carried every month.
