= Troy A. McKenzie =

American lawyer

- Education: Princeton University (BSE); New York University (JD)
- Employer: New York University School of Law
- Known for: Civil procedure, legal education
- Title: Dean

Troy A. McKenzie is an American lawyer who is the dean and Cecelia Goetz Professor of Law at the New York University School of Law. He assumed the position of dean on June 1, 2022, succeeding Trevor Morrison.

== Biography ==
In 1997, McKenzie graduated with a Bachelor of Science in chemical engineering from Princeton University. He went on to receive his Juris Doctor from New York University School of Law, graduating magna cum laude in 2000 after serving as an executive editor of the New York University Law Review. He is a member of the Order of the Coif.

After law school, McKenzie clerked for Judge Pierre Leval of the United States Court of Appeals for the Second Circuit, and then for Justice John Paul Stevens of the United States Supreme Court.

Before joining the NYU faculty in 2007, McKenzie was a litigation associate at Debevoise & Plimpton in New York. His scholarship at NYU Law focuses on civil procedure, bankruptcy law, complex litigation, the federal courts, and class actions.

McKenzie returned to NYU Law in 2017 after serving for two years as the Deputy Assistant Attorney General in the Office of Legal Counsel.

In 2019, McKenzie was the Ropes & Gray Visiting Professor of Law at Harvard Law School. He taught courses on civil procedure and the workings of the U.S. Supreme Court.

He is a member of both the American Law Institute and the American Bankruptcy Institute.

== Selected publications ==
- "'Helpless' Groups," 81 Fordham L. Rev. 3213 (2013)
- "Getting to the Core of Stern v. Marshall: History, Expertise, and the Separation of Powers," 86 Am. Bankr. L.J. 23 (2012)
- "The Mass Tort Bankruptcy: A Pre-History," 5 J. Tort L. 59 (2012)
- "Toward a Bankruptcy Model for Non-Class Aggregate Litigation," 87 N.Y.U. L. Rev. 960 (2012)

== See also ==
- List of law clerks for the fourth seat of the Supreme Court of the United States
