= AFFS =

AFFS may refer to:

- Abby's Flying Fairy School
- Amiga Fast File System (FFS)
- The Association For Free Software, a free software organisation based in the UK
- Advanced Fringe Field Switching technology, BOE Hydis' signature TFT-LCD technology
