= Rascoff =

Surname

Rascoff is a surname. Notable people with the surname include:

- Samuel Rascoff, legal scholar at New York University School of Law
- Spencer Rascoff, co-founder of Hotwire.com
