= New York University School of Law =

Law school in Manhattan, New York City

Coordinates: 40°43′49″N 73°59′58″W

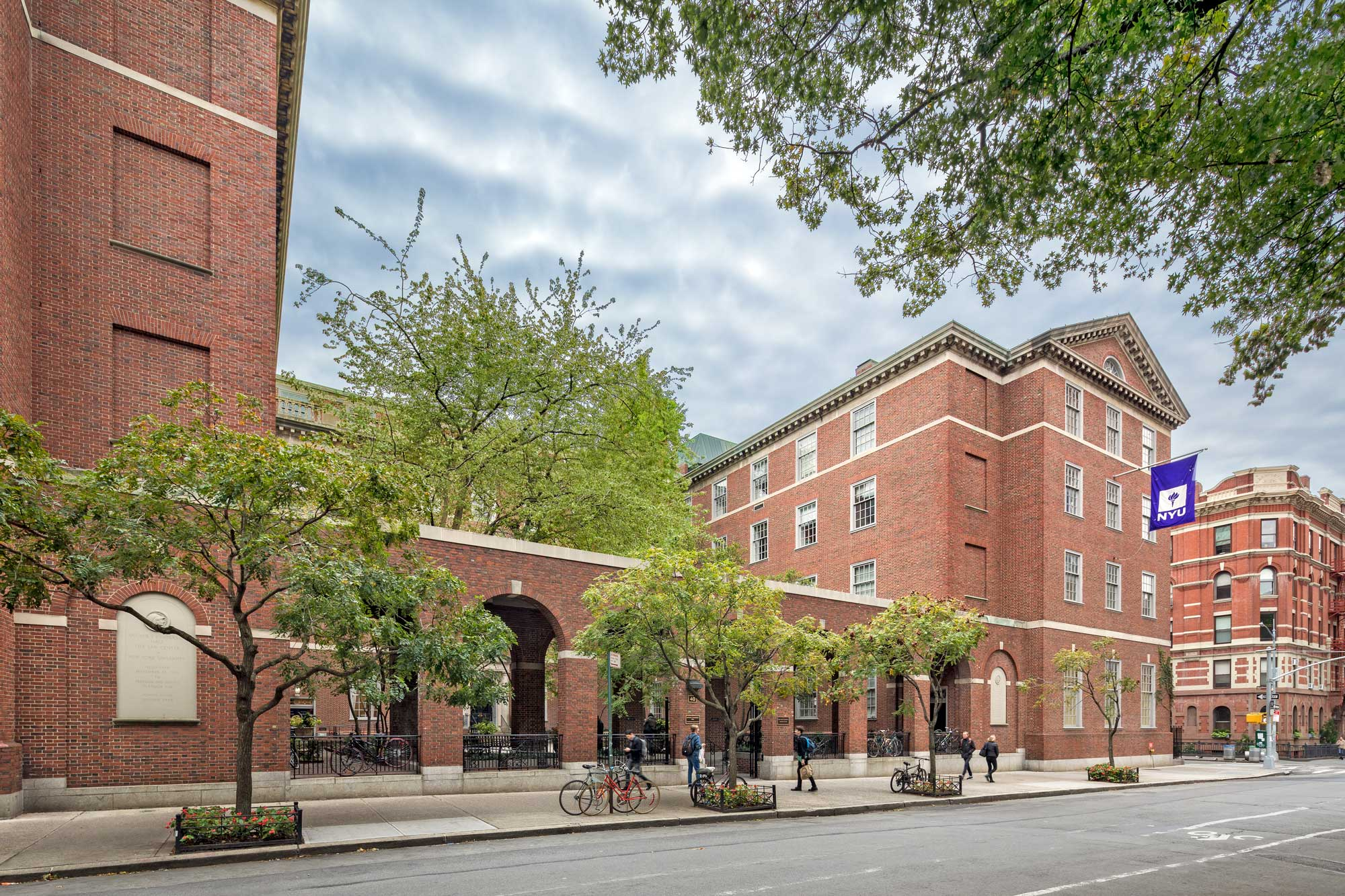
- Parent school: New York University
- Established: June 2, 1835; 191 years ago
- School type: Private law school
- Dean: Troy McKenzie
- Location: New York City, U.S.
- Enrollment: 1,413 full-time (2022)
- Faculty: 393 (2022)
- USNWR ranking: 7th (tied) (2026)
- Bar pass rate: 94.9% (2023)
- Website: law.nyu.edu
- ABA profile: Standard 509 Report
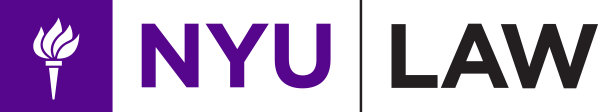

The New York University School of Law (NYU Law) is the law school of New York University, a private research university in New York City.

Established in 1835, it was the first law school established in New York City and is the oldest extant law school in New York State and one of the oldest law schools in the United States. Located in Greenwich Village in Lower Manhattan, NYU Law grants J.D., LL.M., and J.S.D. degrees.

As of 2025, NYU Law's first-time bar passage rate is 96.6 percent, with an ultimate bar passage rate of 99.2 percent.

== History ==
New York University School of Law was founded in 1835, making it the oldest law school in New York City. It is also the oldest surviving law school in New York State and one of the oldest in the United States. The only law school in the state to precede it was a small institution conducted by Peter van Schaack in Kinderhook, New York, from 1785 to his death in 1832. Founded just four years after the establishment of New York University, NYU Law is also the university's oldest professional school.

The school was founded by Benjamin Franklin Butler, the United States Attorney General, at the request of the Council of New York University. Butler submitted to the chancellor of the university, James M. Mathews, a "Plan for the organization of a law faculty in the University of the City of New York," which defined a three-year course of study. This plan was formally accepted by the university council on June 2, 1835, marking the inception of the school of law. Instruction began, and Butler was elected the school's first principal professor in March 1838. The curriculum he instituted was the first in the country to teach law using the "course method," which came to be adopted as the standard for legal education in the United States.

NYU School of Law was one of the first law schools in the United States to admit women, beginning in 1890. The Metropolitan Law School was absorbed by NYU School of Law in 1895, and became its evening division. The law school began raising its standards for admission in the early 20th century. In 1924, it required that all students have had completed at least one year of undergraduate education or its equivalent. This was increased to two undergraduate years in 1926, in conformity with the American Bar Association's recommendation.

The law school relocated to its present location of 40 Washington Square South in Greenwich Village in 1951, under the direction of its dean, Arthur T. Vanderbilt. That year, it also established the Root-Tilden-Kern Scholarship for public service.

== Academics ==
=== Courses ===
NYU Law offers approximately 300 courses in 16 distinct areas of study, as well as 10+ colloquia. An additional 50 international courses are available at non-NYC locations through NYU Law Abroad.

=== Clinics ===
NYU Law hosts between 50-60 clinics and externships every year.

=== Law journals ===
NYU Law publishes ten student-edited law journals. The journals appear below in the order of their founding:

- Moot Court Board (which is considered a journal at NYU Law)
- New York University Law Review
- NYU Annual Survey of American Law
- NYU Journal of International Law and Politics
- Review of Law & Social Change
- New York University Environmental Law Journal
- Journal of Legislation & Public Policy
- Journal of Law & Business, a student-edited law review published online three times each academic year. It was established in 2004. The journal covers a range of business law topics, including bankruptcy and restructuring; capital markets and securities; corporate law and governance; foreign and international business law; hedge funds and private equity; and tax.
- Journal of Law & Liberty
- Journal of Intellectual Property & Entertainment Law

NYU Law also publishes three faculty-edited law journals:

- Clinical Law Review
- The International Journal of Constitutional Law (I·CON)
- Tax Law Review

=== Master's degrees ===
NYU Law School's LL.M. programs in Taxation and in International Taxation have been consistently ranked first by the U.S. News & World Report magazine since they started ranking specialty law school programs in 1992. Brant Hellwig is currently the faculty director of the program.

The MS in Cybersecurity Risk and Strategy is a one-year program offered jointly by NYU School of Law and NYU Tandon School of Engineering. The program is intended for mid-to-senior level professionals, and cohorts have historically been diverse, professionally and academically. Faculty directors include: Nasir Memon, Randy Milch, and Sam Rascoff. Other notable faculty include: Ed Amoroso, Judi Germano, Zach Goldman, Ira Rubinstein, Rob Silvers, and Chris Sprigman. Founding program director: Erin O'Brien (Executive Director & Research Scholar).

The MS in Health Law and Strategy program is a one-year program administered jointly with the NYU Wagner School of Public Service. It offers mid-career professionals and covers the legal aspects of the health sector. Faculty include Sherry Glied, Charlie Klippel, and Jason M. Schultz.

=== Dual degrees ===
More recently, the NYU School of Law has entered into dual degree agreements with the National University of Singapore Faculty of Law and the University of Melbourne Law School.

NYU Law offers a dual-degree program with Harvard's John F. Kennedy School of Government. Students may earn a JD/MPA or a JD/MPP.

NYU Law offers a dual-degree program with the Princeton School of Public and International Affairs. Students may earn a JD/MPA.

There is also an exchange program between Columbia Law School and NYU School of Law which allows a limited number of JD and LL.M. students to take courses at each other's schools. Columbia Law and NYU Law also play a basketball game every spring called the Deans' Cup, to raise money for public interest and community service organizations.

=== Admissions ===
More than 10,500 applicants competed for about 430 seats in the 2025 entering class at NYU Law. The 2010 edition of University of Chicago Professor Brian Leiter's ranking of the top law schools by student quality placed NYU Law 4th out of the 144 accredited schools in the United States.

Admission to the New York University School of Law is highly competitive. The 25th and 75th LSAT percentiles for the 2024 entering class were 169 and 173, respectively, with a median of 172. The 25th and 75th undergraduate GPA percentiles were 3.80 and 3.96, respectively, with a median of 3.91.

== Student life ==
=== Fellowships ===
The law school's Root-Tilden-Kern Scholarship Program is a full-tuition scholarship awarded each year to twenty students committed to public service.

Furman Academic Scholars benefit from full tuition and summer research funding, faculty mentorship, and specialized training to prepare for a legal teaching career. NYU Law graduates can apply to be Furman Academic Fellows, receiving a stipend and other support to produce a work of scholarship to facilitate entering the teaching market. Furman Public Policy Scholars receive training and support to pursue public policy careers, including work experience in Washington, DC.

NYU Law offers several fellowships to students admitted to the LLM Program. The Hauser Global Scholarship admits eight to ten top LLM students from all over the world. The scholarship includes full tuition waiver and reasonable accommodation costs. In addition, it offers the Hugo Grotius as well as Vanderbilt Scholarships for international law studies and other branches of law respectively.

The school has a law and business program in which eight student-leaders in law and business are awarded fellowships in the Mitchell Jacobson Leadership Program. In addition, the NYU Center for Law, Economics and Organization administers the Lawrence Lederman Fellowship to facilitate the study of law and economics the program provides a $5,000 scholarship to selected students to work closely with NYU Law faculty and participate in a series of collaborative workshops designed to help students write a substantial research paper.

=== Employment ===
Graduates of the law school routinely obtain employment in elite public and private-sector positions. According to New York University School of Law's official 2025 ABA-required disclosures, 95.4 percent of the JD Class of 2024 obtained full-time, long-term, JD-required employment nine months after graduation. Among the 2024 Tax LLM graduates, 98 percent were employed full time nine months after graduation.

The law school was ranked fifth of all law schools nationwide by the US News and World Report in terms of having the highest percentage of 2024 graduates employed in public interest law, calculated at 21 percent.

=== Costs ===
The total estimated cost of attendance (indicating the cost of tuition, fees, and living expenses) at NYU Law for the 2025–2026 academic year is $123,308. The Law School Transparency estimated debt-financed cost of attendance for three years is $309,177.

The majority of the Fall 2024 entering JD class received financial aid, with an average annual scholarship award of $31,698. NYU Law's Loan Repayment Assistance Program (LRAP) eases the burden of debt repayment for qualifying alumni who choose careers in public service. Most LRAP participants can earn up to $110,000 a year and have no monthly payment on their law school loans.

== Facilities ==
=== Buildings ===
NYU Law School facilities at the school's Washington Square Campus include:

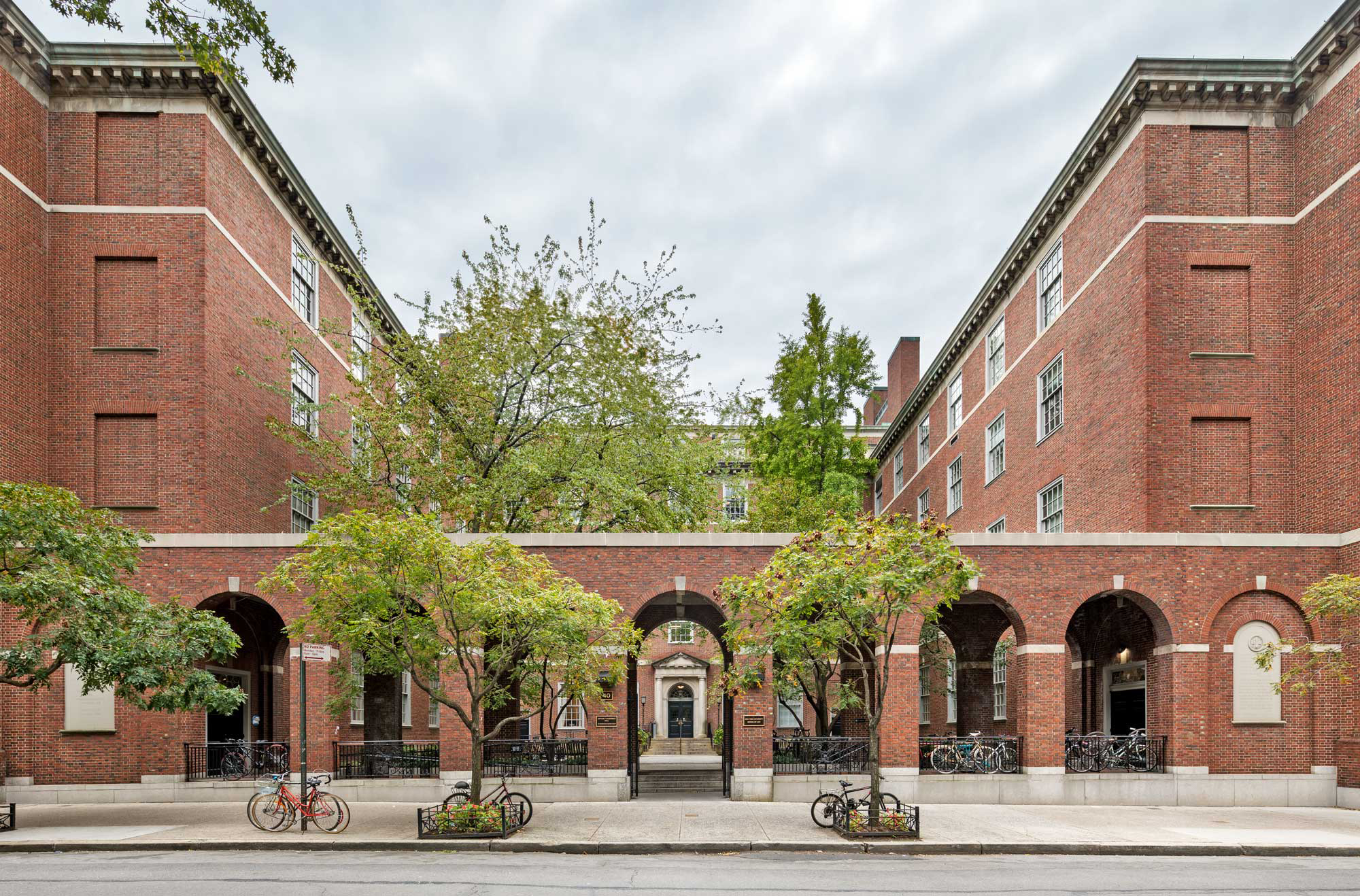
Vanderbilt Hall

==== Vanderbilt Hall ====
The law school's main building, named after Arthur T. Vanderbilt, occupies the entire block between West Third and Washington Square South (West Fourth) and between Macdougal and Sullivan Streets. Part of the first floor as well as the underground floors host the library, which it shares with Furman Hall. The first floor also holds the auditorium, student center, and main banquet hall. The second floor is mostly classrooms, while the third and fourth floors are mostly faculty and dean offices.

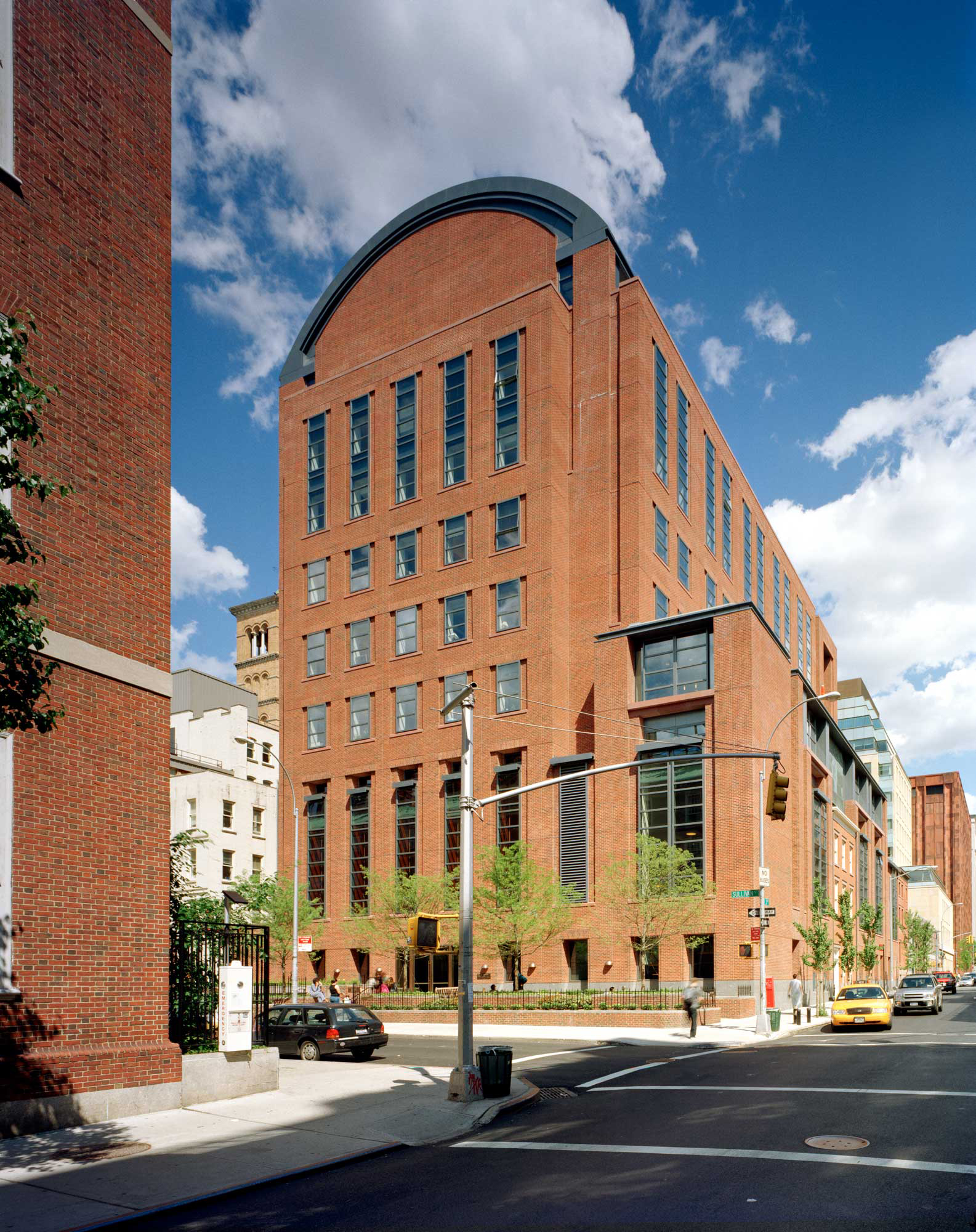
Furman Hall

==== Furman Hall ====
Located on West 3rd Street between Sullivan and Thompson Streets, and on Sullivan and Thompson Streets between West 3rd and West 4th Streets, Furman Hall opened on January 22, 2004, and is named for alumnus and donor Jay Furman. It connects to Vanderbilt Hall through the law library, part of which is underneath Sullivan Street. The underground level also hosts the Lawyering faculty. Floors one-three have classrooms, lounges, and study space. The fourth floor hosts the career counseling program, and the fifth and sixth floors house the legal practice clinics. The highest floors, generally inaccessible to non-residents, are apartments for faculty and their families. The ninth floor is accessible to students and hosts the Lester Pollack Colloquium room.

The building's West 3rd Street facade incorporates the remaining part of the facade of a townhouse that Edgar Allan Poe lived in from 1844 to 1846, near the site where the house originally stood, the result of a settlement between NYU and preservationists who objected to the university's 2000 plan to tear down the building, which had already lost two stories from the time that Poe dwelled there.

==== Hayden Hall ====
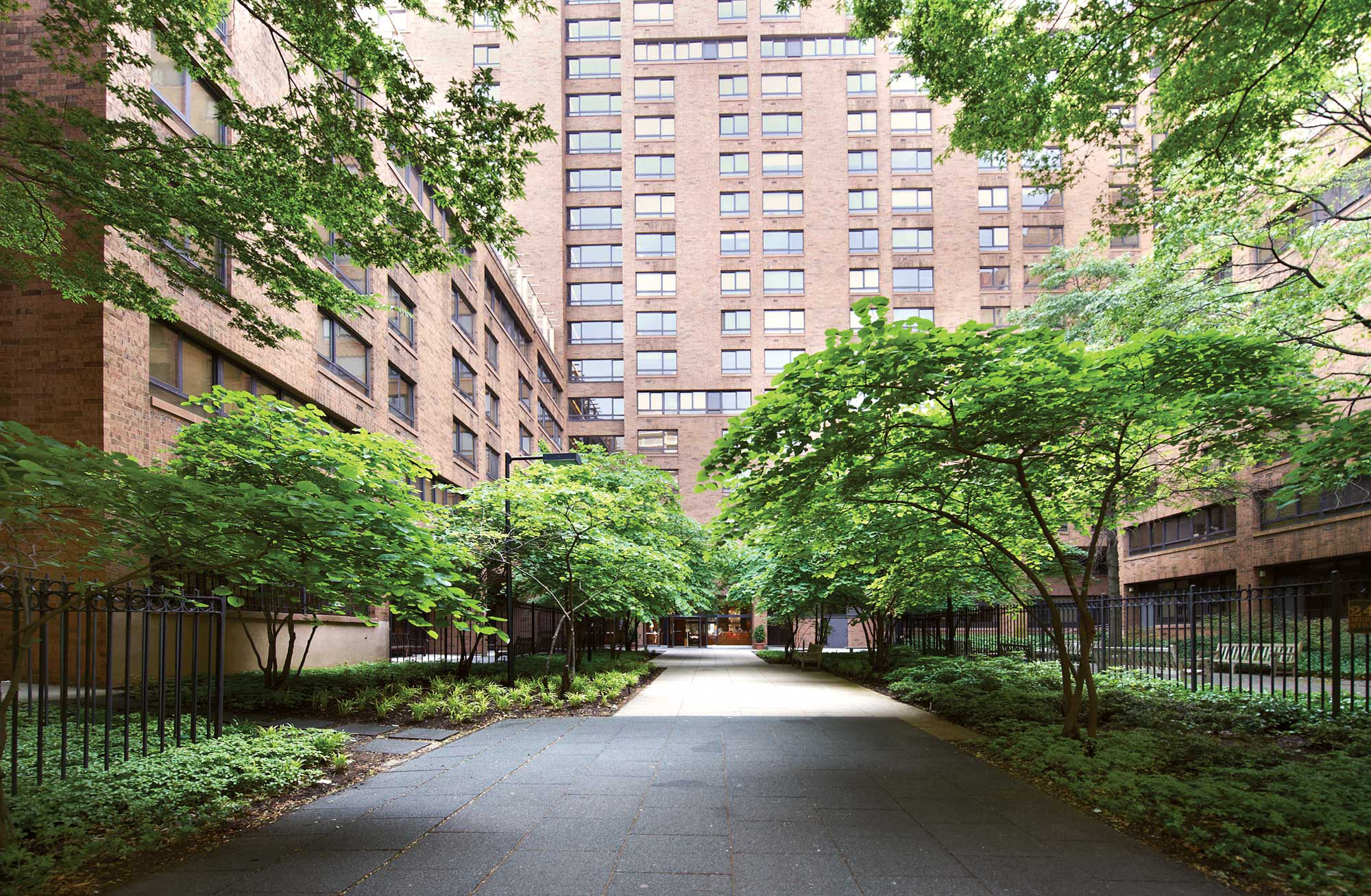
Hayden residence hall

Located at 240 Mercer Street, on the southern side of West Third street, adjacent to Broadway, and a couple of blocks east of D'Agostino Hall, Wilf Hall, Furman Hall and Vanderbilt Hall, Hayden Hall houses approximately 500 Law students and faculty.

==== D'Agostino Hall ====
Located at the intersection of West Third Street and MacDougal Street in Greenwich Village, D'Agostino Residence Hall houses approximately 300 law students and faculty. It is across the street from the rear of the main law school building, Vanderbilt Hall, and less than 1 block from Wilf Hall and Furman Hall.

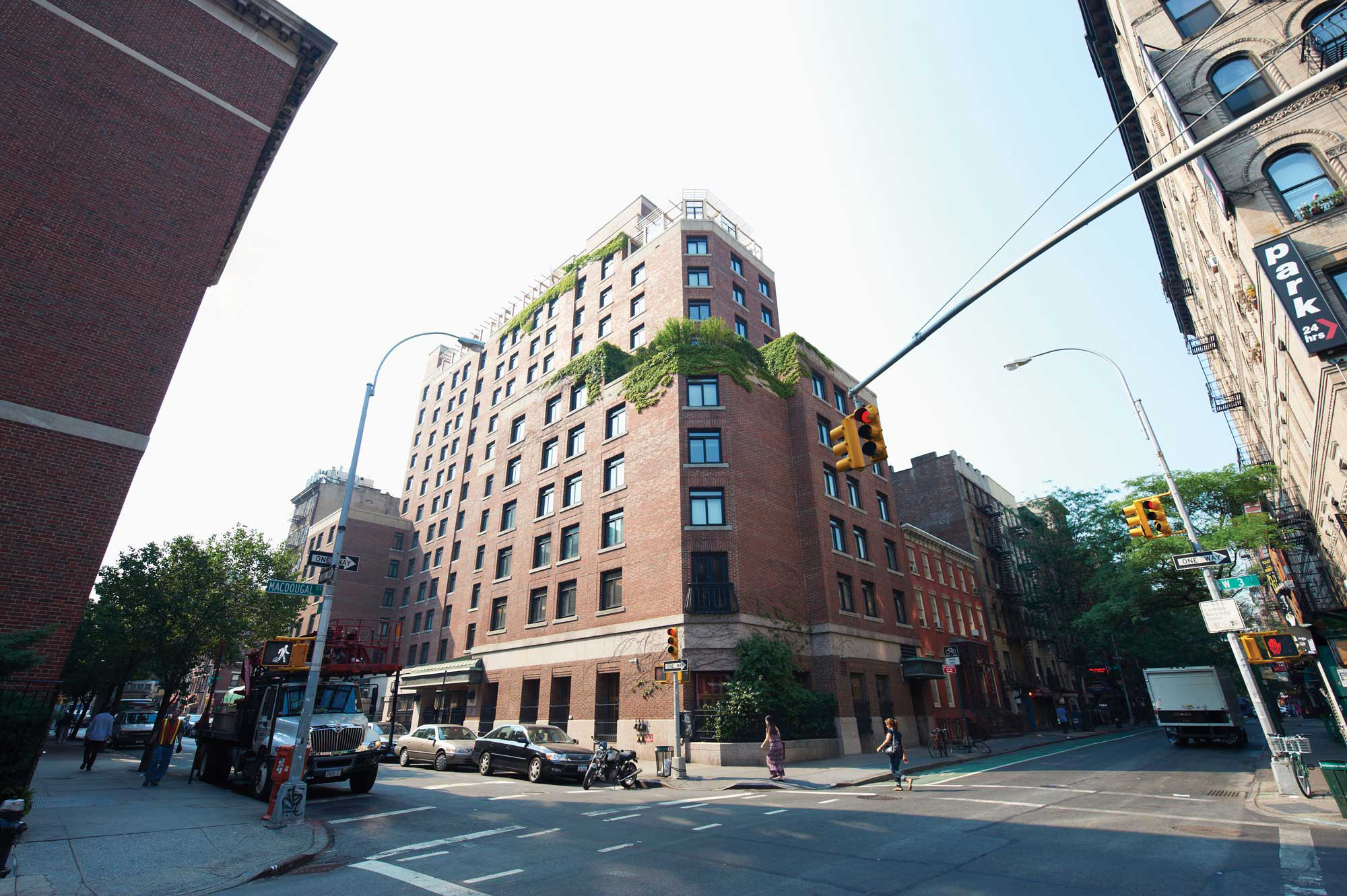
D'Agostino Hall

Elevators to the apartments are on the highest level, the Front Desk is on the street level, and The Commons (residents' lounge with computers and printers) is on the lower level. One floor beneath The Commons is the sub-basement, home to most of NYU's legal journals. The second (above-ground) floor, houses numerous administrative offices (Development, Alumni Relations, Special Events, Communications, Human Resources and Financial Services). Two large function rooms - Lipton Hall and the Faculty Club - are also located in the building.

The law building is named after Filomen D'Agostino, one of the first woman lawyers, who graduated in 1920. Later in life, Ms. D'Agostino donated $4 million to support residential scholarship and faculty research; the school responded by naming their new apartment building after her.

==== 22 Washington Square North ====
22 Washington Square North, located in a historic 1830s townhouse on the north side of Washington Square Park in "The Row", houses the Straus Institute for the Advanced Study of Law & Justice, the Jean Monnet Center for International and Regional Economic Law & Justice, and the Tikvah Center for Law & Jewish Civilization. This building was renovated in 2009.

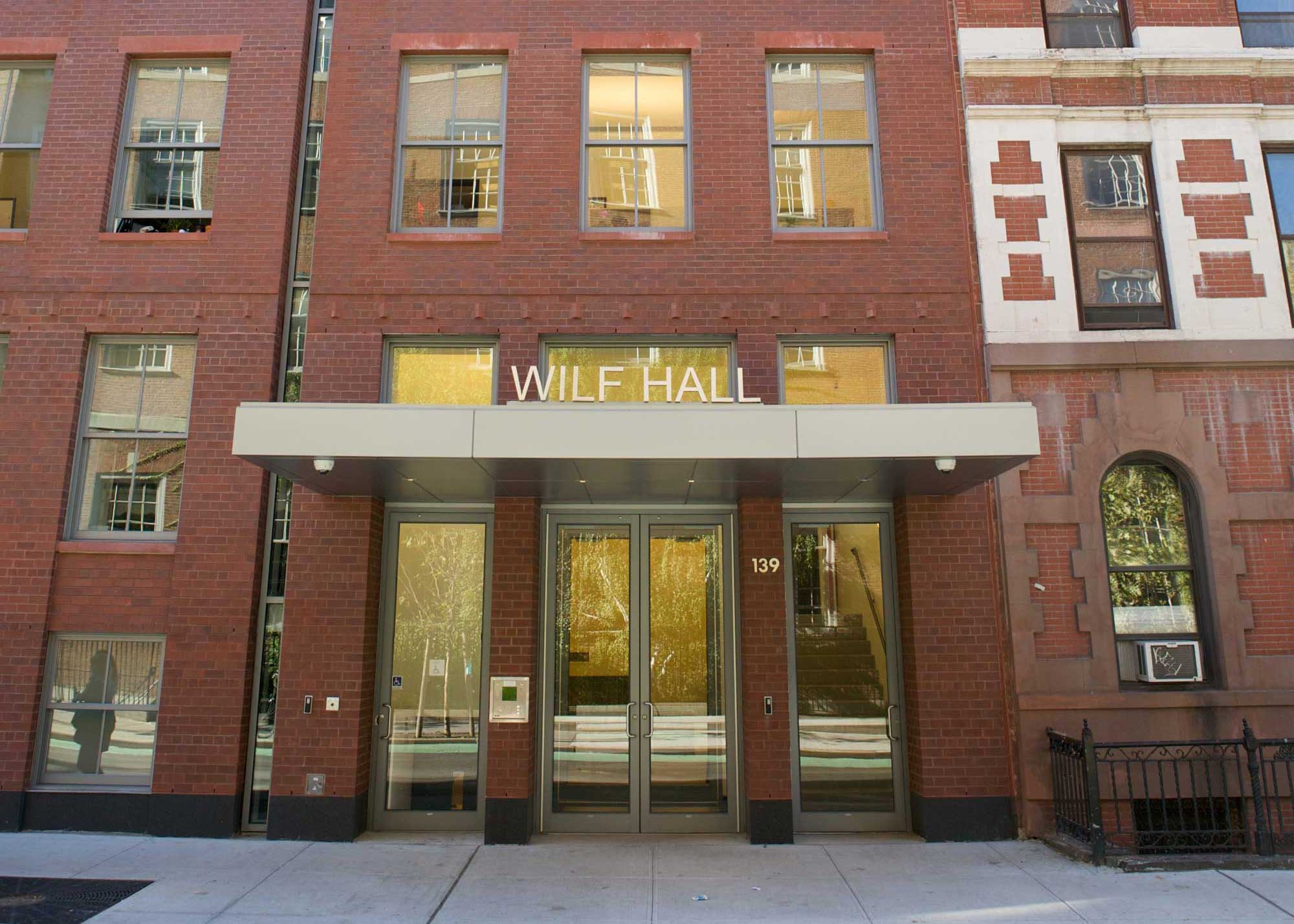
Wilf Hall

==== Wilf Hall ====
Wilf Hall, at 139 Macdougal Street, houses approximately a dozen of the schools centers, programs and institutes as well as the admissions offices (Graduate and JD). Per the NYU Law Magazine, it is a "campus destination for faculty, students, and research scholars from an array of disciplines to exchange ideas and, through their work, shape the public discourse around the leading social and political issues of the day."

Wilf Hall also contains the Provincetown Playhouse. The playhouse opened in the 1920s and premiered many Eugene O'Neil plays. The theatre is run by NYU's Steinhardt School of Education. The building was designed by Morris Adjmi Architects.

=== Centers and institutes ===
NYU Law is home to many centers and institutes, specializing in various areas of law:

- The Brennan Center for Justice focuses on issues involving democracy and justice.
- The Center for Law, Economics and Organization promotes interdisciplinary research and teaching in law and economics. It is directed by Jennifer Arlen, Oren Bar-Gill, John Ferejohn, Mark Geistfeld, Lewis Kornhauser, and Geoffrey Miller.
- The Reiss Center on Law and Security.
- Just Security is housed by the Reiss Center. It is an editorially independent online forum for analysis of U.S. national security law and policy. Its fellows include: Peter Bergen, Sidney Blumenthal, Peter Clarke, Roger Cressey, Barton Gellman, Bernard Haykel, Michael Sheehan, and Lawrence Wright. Its former fellows included: Amos Elon, Baltasar Garzón, Tara McKelvey, Dana Priest, and Nir Rosen. The Center generates awareness of the legal dimension of security issues, including the Terrorist Trial Report Card, a comprehensive study on every terrorism prosecution in the United States since the September 11, 2001, terrorist attacks.
- The Center on the Administration of Criminal Law is a think-tank dedicated to the promotion of good government and prosecution practices in criminal matters, with a focus on the exercise of power and discretion by prosecutors. Its academic component gathers empirical research, publishes scholarship, and organizes and hosts conferences and symposia. Its litigation component litigate criminal cases or cases having implications for the administration of criminal law, particularly cases in which the exercise of power and discretion by prosecutors raises substantive legal issues. Its public policy and media component seeks to improve public dialogue on criminal justice matters in various ways, including testifying before public officials and the publishing of op-ed pieces.
- The Furman Center for Real Estate and Urban Policy is a joint venture between the law school and NYU's Robert F. Wagner Graduate School of Public Service. It is an academic research center devoted to the public policy aspects of land use, real estate development and housing.
- The Engelberg Center on Innovation Law and Policy is led by faculty members Barton Beebe, Rochelle Dreyfuss, Jeanne Fromer, Scott Hemphill, Jason Schultz, Christopher Sprigman, and Kathy Strandburg, along with Executive Director Michael Weinberg.
- The Hauser Global Law School Program, launched in 1994, program incorporates non-U.S. and transnational legal perspectives into the law school's curriculum, promotes scholarship on comparative and global law, and brings together faculty, scholars, and students from around the world.
- The Institute for Executive Education offers focused training for professionals and integrates key elements of law, business, and public policy into its programming. Led by Faculty Director Gerald Rosenfeld and Executive Director Erin O'Brien, the institute provides custom programs for organizations. Custom programs allow organizations such as law firms, universities, corporations, NGOs, and government entities to create specialized training for professionals. Notable faculty include: Trevor Morrison, José Alvarez, Preet Bharara, Randy Milch, Kenji Yoshino, Stephen Choi, Jerome Cohen, Mitchell Kane, Philip Alston, David Rosenbloom, Benedict Kingsbury, and Sam Rascoff.
- The Institute for International Law and Justice.
- The Institute for Law & Society is a joint venture between the law school and the NYU Graduate School of Arts and Science. It serves as an intellectual center for faculty, graduate students, and law students interested in studying law and legal institutions from an interdisciplinary social science perspective. It offers an opportunity to earn a J.D.-Ph.D or J.D.-M.A. dual degree in law and society.
- The Institute for Policy Integrity is a non-partisan think tank directed by Richard Revesz and Don Goodson. It produces original scholarly research in the fields of economics, law, and public policy and advocates for reform before courts and government agencies, with a primary focus on environmental and energy policy.
- The Pollack Center for Law and Business is a joint venture between the law school and the New York University Stern School of Business. The center is designed to enrich the professional education of students of law and business and to facilitate joint teaching to involve leaders in banking, business, and law in the intellectual life of the university through sponsorship of meetings, conferences and dinners. The Pollack Center also offers a program for students to earn the Advanced Professional Certificate in Law and Business.
- The State Energy & Environmental Impact Center is an independent non-partisan academic center dedicated to the study and support of state attorneys general in their work defending and promoting clean energy, climate and environmental law and policies. The executive director is Bethany Davis Noll.
- The Straus Institute for the Advanced Study of Law & Justice brings in as Fellows each year approximately 14 leading scholars from different disciplines and cultures. Each year the Straus Institute defines an annual theme that serves as the overarching subject around which the annual fora, colloquia and conference are set. The faculty director is Joseph H. H. Weiler.
- The Tikvah Center for Law & Jewish Civilization is headed by Moshe Halbertal and Joseph H. H. Weiler.
- The U.S.-Asia Law Institute serves as a resource and partner to various Asian countries as they reform and further develop their legal systems and institutions. It also works to improve the understanding of Asian legal systems by lawyers, academics, policy makers and the public. The faculty director is Jerome A. Cohen.
- The Marron Institute.
- The Center on Race, Inequality, and the Law. The faculty directors are Anthony Thompson and Deborah N. Archer.
- The Tax Law Center
- NYU-Yale American Indian Sovereignty Project

== People ==
=== List of deans ===
Deans
No.	Name	Years	Ref.
1	Benjamin Franklin Butler	1835–1856	
2	Thomas W. Clerke	1858–1864	
3	John Norton Pomeroy	1864–1871	
4	Henry E. Davies	1871–1881	
5	Aaron J. Vanderpoel	1881–1887	
6	David Ralph Jaques	1887–1891	
7	Austin Abbott	1891–1896	
8	Clarence D. Ashley	1896–1916	
9	Frank Sommer	1916–1943	
10	Arthur T. Vanderbilt	1943–1948	
11	Russell D. Niles	1948–1963	
12	Miguel de Capriles	1964–1967	
13	Robert McKay	1967–1975	
14	Norman Redlich	1975–1987	
15	John Sexton	1988–2002	
16	Richard Revesz	2002–2013	
17	Trevor Morrison	2013–2022	
18	Troy A. McKenzie	2022–present	

=== Notable faculty ===
NYU's notable professors include:

- Philip Alston (human rights)
- Anthony Amsterdam (criminal law, capital punishment)
- Kwame Anthony Appiah (legal philosophy)
- Deborah Archer (racial justice, civil rights)
- Rachel Barkow (administrative law, criminal law and procedure)
- Lily Batchelder (tax law, business tax reform, wealth transfer taxes)
- Robert Bauer (law and politics, political reform)
- Maggie Blackhawk (constitutional law, federal Indian law)
- Richard Epstein (law and economics, torts, health law & policy)
- Cynthia Estlund (labor law, employment law, property)
- Samuel Estreicher (labor law, employment law, administrative law)
- Tali Farhadian (criminal law)
- Barry Friedman (constitutional law, criminal law)
- Jeanne Fromer (intellectual property)
- David W. Garland (criminal law, sociology)
- Stephen Gillers (legal ethics)
- Daniel Hemel, (tax law, administrative law, animal law)
- C. Scott Hemphill (intellectual property, antitrust law)
- Stephen Holmes (liberal democracy)
- Samuel Issacharoff (procedure, democracy)
- Sally Katzen (administrative law)
- Emma Kaufman (administrative law, constitutional law, criminal law)
- Benedict Kingsbury (international law)
- John Koeltl (constitutional litigation)
- Theodor Meron (international law)
- Arthur R. Miller (civil procedure, copyright, and privacy)
- Trevor Morrison (dean, constitutional law)
- Melissa Erica Murray (constitutional law)
- Thomas Nagel (legal philosophy)
- Burt Neuborne (evidence, Holocaust litigation expert)
- Richard Pildes (constitutional law, election law)
- Richard Revesz (environmental law)
- Samuel Scheffler (legal philosophy)
- John Sexton (civil procedure)
- Catherine Sharkey (tort law, empirical legal studies)
- Linda J. Silberman (conflict of laws, civil procedure, international arbitration)
- Sonia Sotomayor, Associate Justice of the Supreme Court of the United States
- Bryan Stevenson (criminal law, capital punishment)
- Jeremy Waldron (legal philosophy)
- Joseph H. H. Weiler (international law)
- Katrina Wyman (environmental law, property law)
- Kenji Yoshino (constitutional law, LGBT rights)

=== Notable alumni ===
Notable alumni include governor and Democratic presidential candidate Samuel J. Tilden; U.S. Senators Lamar Alexander, Rudy Boschwitz and Jacob Javits; former New York City mayors Fiorello La Guardia, Ed Koch, and Rudy Giuliani; former New York City Councilman and Council Consumer Affairs Committee Chairman David B. Friedland; New York City police commissioner Raymond Kelly; Republic of China President Ma Ying-Jeou; former president of Panama Guillermo Endara; former FBI director Louis Freeh; suffragette and college founding president Jessica Garretson Finch; Centennial Professor of Law at Brooklyn Law School and first female SEC Commissioner Roberta Karmel; sportscaster Howard Cosell; former NFL commissioner Paul Tagliabue; John F. Kennedy Jr.; Jared Kushner, Special Inspector General of the Troubled Asset Relief Program, Neil Barofsky; U.S. Representatives, such as Hakeem Jeffries; Mitchell Jenkins, Jefferson Monroe Levy, and Isaac Siegel; former chairman of Paramount Pictures Jonathan Dolgen; Hollywood and Broadway producer Marc E. Platt; Hollywood producer and former chairman and CEO of Sony Pictures Entertainment; comedian Demetri Martin (did not graduate); Peter Guber; journalist Glenn Greenwald; civil rights leader and former United States associate attorney general Vanita Gupta; president and director-counsel of the NAACP Legal Defense Fund Sherrilyn Ifill; several corporate leaders including Interpublic Group of Companies chairman and CEO Michael I. Roth; ConocoPhillips president and COO John Carrig; Southwest Airlines founder Herb Kelleher; Marvel Entertainment vice-president John Turitzin; Nobel Peace Prize laureates Elihu Root and Mohamed ElBaradei; international human rights lawyer Amal Clooney; former United States Attorney for the Eastern District of New York Breon Peace; and real estate developer, Miami Dolphins principal owner, and philanthropist Stephen M. Ross.

NYU Law alumni have served as judges of the International Court of Justice, popularly known as the World Court, and of the Inter-American Court of Human Rights. Alumni judges include Judith Kaye and Jonathan Lippman, former chief judges of the New York Court of Appeals; Dennis G. Jacobs, chief judge of the United States Court of Appeals for the Second Circuit; Second Circuit Judge Raymond Lohier, and United States Court of Appeals for the Federal Circuit judge, Pauline Newman. NYU Law private practice lawyers include the four founders of Wachtell, Lipton, Rosen & Katz, and Cravath, Swaine & Moore chairman Evan Chesler.

== See also ==
- Law of New York
