= Topsy Labs =

US social search and analytics company

Topsy Labs, Inc.
- Type: Subsidiary
- Industry: Social network analytics
- Founded: 2007
- Founder: Vipul Ved Prakash; Rishab Aiyer Ghosh; Gary Iwatani; Justin Foutts
- Defunct: December 16, 2015
- Fate: Acquired by Apple
- Headquarters: San Francisco, California, US
- Area served: Worldwide
- Key people: Duncan Greatwood – CEO; Vipul Ved Prakash - co-founder and CTO; Rishab Aiyer Ghosh – co-founder & Chief Scientist; Rich Maier – SVP, Sales; Jamie de Guerre – VP, Product; Ted Cui – VP, Engineering; David Berk – VP, Operations
- Services: Twitter and Google+ analytics
- Website: topsy.com at the Wayback Machine (archived 2012-02-29)

Topsy Labs was a social search and analytics company based in San Francisco, California. The company was a certified Twitter partner and maintained a comprehensive index of tweets, numbering in the hundreds of billions, dating back to Twitter's inception in 2006.

Topsy made products to search, analyze and draw insights from conversations and trends on the public social websites including Twitter and Google+.

The company was acquired by Apple in December 2013, and shut down on December 16, 2015.

== History ==
Topsy was founded in 2007 by Vipul Ved Prakash, Rishab Aiyer Ghosh, Gary Iwatani and Justin Foutts. The company had raised over US$27 million in venture capital from BlueRun Ventures, Ignition Partners, Founders Fund, Scott Banister and other investors. The company had over 40 employees with offices in San Francisco and Washington DC and was operating its own data centers.

In December 2013, Topsy was acquired by Apple for a reported value of around $225 million. On December 16, 2015, the Topsy service was shut down, and its website was redirected to an Apple support page discussing the search functionality of iOS 9.

== Products ==
=== Topsy.com ===
Topsy.com was a real-time search engine for social posts and socially shared content, primarily on Twitter and Google Plus. The service ranked results using a proprietary social influence algorithm that measured social media authors on how much others supported what they were saying. The service also provided access to metrics for any term mentioned on Twitter via its free analytic service at analytics.topsy.com, where users could compare up to three terms for content in the past hour, day, week or month. It was announced in September 2013 that Topsy would include every public tweet ever published on Twitter for search and analysis.

=== Topsy Pro Analytics ===
Topsy Pro Analytics was a commercial web dashboard application that allowed users to conduct interactive analysis on keywords and authors by activity, influence, exposure, sentiment, language or geography. Users could discover the most relevant tweets, links, photos and videos for any term from Topsy's index of hundreds of billions of tweets. Users were able to group terms into saved topics and setup customized alerts and daily activity digests.

=== Topsy Pro Analytics Public Sector ===
Topsy Pro Analytics was a version of the Topsy Pro Analytics product for government agencies. The intended purpose of the product was to facilitate disaster response, quantify political issues, detect disease outbreak and monitor global anomalies.

=== API Services ===
Topsy provided a set of REST APIs to programmatically access to Twitter data and metrics. Users could also access this data via ad-hoc report requests.

== Social indices ==
=== Twitter Political Index ===
This index was co-developed by Twitter and Topsy. It debuted in August 2012 and originally compared social sentiment for the two primary American presidential candidates.

=== Twitter Oscars Index ===
This index was also co-developed by Twitter and Topsy. It debuted in January 2013 and originally compared social sentiment for films nominated for Academy awards in six categories: Best Picture, Best Actor. Best Actress, Best Supporting Actor, Best Supporting Actress and Best Director. Topsy sentiment analysis used in this index correctly predicted five out of the six award recipients.

=== SXSW Trendspotter ===
In March 2013, Mashable and Topsy co-produced the Mashable SXSW Trendspotter, which was a mobile-enabled website where visitors could see what was trending at the SXSW event, based on real-time analysis of Twitter conversations. The SXSW Trendspotter provided analysis of:

- Trending topics
- Which start-ups, brands, bands and films were generating popular social conversations
- Which SXSW sessions and events were the most popular
- Details about the top tweets, news, photos and videos around each topic
