= Rachel Barkow =

American legal scholar

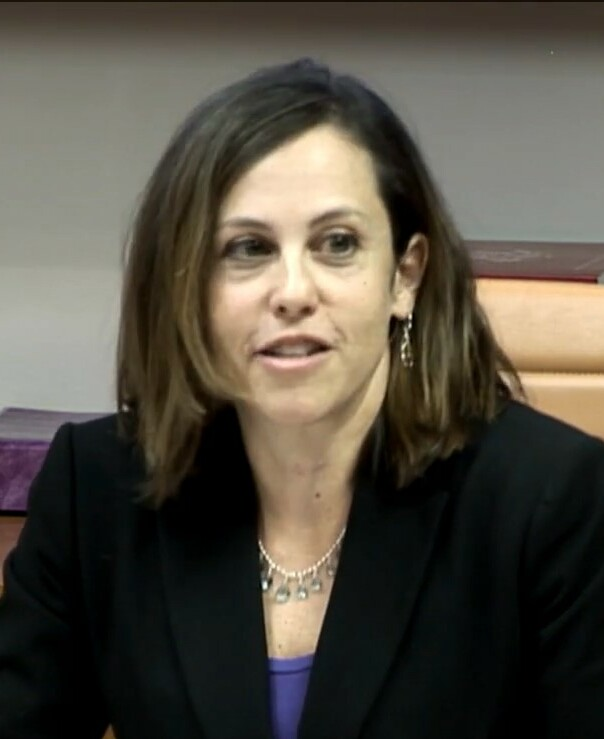
- Born: 1971 (age 54–55)

Academic background
- Education: Harvard University (JD); Northwestern University (AB)

Academic work
- Discipline: Law
- Sub-discipline: Administrative law, criminal law
- Institutions: New York University School of Law

Member of the United States Sentencing Commission
- In office June 2013 – January 2019
- Preceded by: Beryl A. Howell
- Succeeded by: John Gleeson

Rachel Elise Barkow (née Selinfreund; born 1971) is an American professor of law at the New York University School of Law. She is also faculty director of the Center on the Administration of Criminal Law. Her scholarship focuses on administrative and criminal law, and she is especially interested in applying the lessons and theory of administrative law to the administration of criminal justice. In 2007, Barkow won the Podell Distinguished Teaching Award at NYU. In the fall of 2008, she served as the Beneficial Visiting Professor of Law at Harvard Law School. In 2025, Barkow released a book titled Justice Abandoned which highlights six Supreme Court decisions that paved the way for mass incarceration in the United States.

== Education and clerkships ==
In 1993, Barkow graduated from Northwestern University with a Bachelor of Arts in history and psychology and was inducted as a member of Phi Beta Kappa. In 1996, she graduated magna cum laude from Harvard Law School. At Harvard, Barkow won the Sears Prize (awarded to the top two grade point averages in the first year of law school), and served on the Harvard Law Review.

She clerked for Judge Laurence H. Silberman at the U.S. Court of Appeals for the District of Columbia Circuit, and for Justice Antonin Scalia at the U.S. Supreme Court, according to one report serving as the "counter-clerk"—the nickname given to the Democrat he hires to sniff out political biases in his arguments.

== Legal career ==
Barkow was an associate at Kellogg, Huber, Hansen, Todd & Evans in Washington, D.C., from 1998–2002, where she focused on telecommunications and administrative law issues in proceedings before the FCC, state regulatory agencies, and federal and state courts. She took a leave from the firm in 2001 to serve as the John M. Olin Fellow in Law at Georgetown University Law Center.

She has published more than 40 articles, essays, and book chapters, and her work has appeared in the country's top law reviews. She has contributed editorials to publications such as the New York Times, Washington Post, Huffington Post, and the Boston Herald.

== Public service ==
She was a member of the Manhattan District Attorney's Office's Conviction Integrity Policy Advisory Panel from 2010–2021. She has testified before the United States House of Representatives Subcommittee Crime, Terrorism, and Homeland Security on Clemency,; before the Subcommittee on Commerce, Trade, and Consumer Protection regarding the proposed Consumer Financial Protection Agency,; before the Subcommittee on the Constitution, Civil Rights, and Civil Liberties,; and before the United States Senate Judiciary Committee regarding the future of the federal sentencing guidelines in the wake of the Supreme Court's decision in Blakely v. Washington.

On April 15, 2013, President Obama nominated Barkow to serve as a Commissioner on the U.S. Sentencing Commission. According to her NYU Law biography, Barkow served as a Commissioner on the U.S. Sentencing Commission from June 2013 until January 2019, although the U.S. Sentencing Commission website says that she ended her appointment in 2018.

== Honors and awards ==
She was elected to the American Academy of Arts and Sciences in 2019.

== Selected publications ==
- ———; Osler, Mark (2015). "Restructuring Clemency: The Cost of Ignoring Clemency and a Plan for Renewal". University of Chicago Law Review. 82 (1): 1–26. JSTOR 43234686.
- ——— (2013). "Prosecutorial Administration: Prosecutor Bias and the Department of Justice". Virginia Law Review. 99 (2): 271–342. JSTOR 23528857.
- ——— (2006). "Separation of Powers and the Criminal Law". Stanford Law Review. 58 (4): 989–1054. JSTOR 40040287.
- ——— (2005). "Federalism and the Politics of Sentencing". Columbia Law Review. 105 (4): 1276–1314. JSTOR 4099434.
- ——— (2002). "More Supreme than Court? The Fall of the Political Question Doctrine and the Rise of Judicial Supremacy". Columbia Law Review. 102 (2): 237–336. doi:10.2307/1123824. JSTOR 1123824.

== See also ==
- List of law clerks for the ninth seat of the Supreme Court of the United States
