= Deans' Cup =

US charity basketball game

The Deans' Cup is an annual charity basketball game between Columbia Law School (CLS) and New York University School of Law (NYU), two of the top law schools in the country. First held in 2002, the game raises money for public interest and community service organizations at both universities and is sponsored by many large New York City law firms. A game between faculty members of the two schools is held at halftime. The game is the single largest law school event in the United States, and has raised more than a half million dollars for public interest foundations at the two law schools.

The 2020 and 2021 editions of the Deans' Cup were canceled due to the COVID-19 pandemic, but the game returned in 2022 and was played at Columbia University's Levien Gymnasium on April 9, 2022. NYU won by a final score of 48-34.

== Past results ==
Venues

- John A. Paulson Center (formerly Coles Sports and Recreation Center) (NYU)
- Levien Gymnasium (Columbia)

Year	Winning Team		Losing Team		Location	Series	
2002	Columbia	42	New York University	39	Levien Gymnasium	CLS	1–0
2003	New York University	37	Columbia	35	Coles Sports Center	—	1–1
2004	New York University	77	Columbia	75	Levien Gymnasium	NYU	2–1
2005	New York University	72	Columbia	66	Coles Sports Center	NYU	3–1
2006	Columbia	67	New York University	47	Levien Gymnasium	NYU	3–2
2007	New York University	68	Columbia	65	Coles Sports Center	NYU	4–2
2008	Columbia	83	New York University	64	Coles Sports Center	NYU	4–3
2009	New York University	56	Columbia	53	Levien Gymnasium	NYU	5–3
2010	New York University	55	Columbia	45	Levien Gymnasium	NYU	6–3
2011	New York University	78	Columbia	67	Coles Sports Center	NYU	7–3
2012	New York University	56	Columbia	46	Levien Gymnasium	NYU	8–3
2013	New York University	70	Columbia	67	Coles Sports Center	NYU	9–3
2014	Columbia	74	New York University	56	Levien Gymnasium	NYU	9–4
2015	New York University	85	Columbia	80	Coles Sports Center	NYU	10–4
2016	Columbia	75	New York University	71	Levien Gymnasium	NYU	10–5
2017	New York University	81	Columbia	64	Levien Gymnasium	NYU	11–5
2018	New York University	59	Columbia	57	Levien Gymnasium	NYU	12–5
2019	New York University	68	Columbia	53	Levien Gymnasium	NYU	13–5
2022	New York University	48	Columbia	34	Levien Gymnasium	NYU	14–5
2023	Columbia	65	New York University	63	Levien Gymnasium	NYU	14–6
2024	New York University	61	Columbia	54	Levien Gymnasium	NYU	15–6
2025	Columbia	63	New York University	50	Paulson Center	NYU	15–7
2026	Columbia	52	New York University	40	Levien Gymnasium	NYU	15–8
