= Center on the Administration of Criminal Law =

American think tank

The Center on the Administration of Criminal Law is a think-tank dedicated to the promotion of good government and prosecution practices in criminal matters. Its work has been the subject of a feature story in the Associated Press.

== History and mission ==
The center was established in June 2008 at New York University School of Law. The center is apolitical and seeks to apply its experience and expertise in criminal justice matters, as well as its empirical research, to improve the administration of criminal justice. The Center analyzes important issues in criminal law or having implications for the administration of criminal law. In particular, the Center focuses on the exercise of power and discretion by prosecutors.

The Center accomplishes its mission in three areas: academia, litigation, and participating in public policy and media debates. The center is the first organization dedicated to defining good government practices in criminal prosecutions through this multi-pronged strategy.

== Academia ==
The center's academic component gathers empirical research, publishes scholarship, and organizes and hosts conferences and symposia.

=== Annual conference ===
In addition to hosting various conferences and events throughout the year, the center hosts one annual major conference on criminal prosecution, choosing a different substantive or procedural focus each year:

| Date | Title | Conference Synopsis |
|---|---|---|
| May 8, 2009 | Regulation By Prosecutors | Focused on the regulation of private industry by criminal prosecutors. Keynote address was delivered by James B. Comey, former Deputy Attorney General of the United States and United States Attorney for the Southern District of New York. A forthcoming book, Prosecutors In the Boardroom: Using Criminal Law to Regulate Corporate Conduct, made up of papers contributed by scholars who participated in the conference will be published by New York University Press. |
| April 23, 2010 | Allocating Prosecutorial Power: How Prosecutors Compete, Cooperate and Clash | Focused on the inter- and intra-jurisdictional cooperation and competition among criminal prosecutors. Keynote address was delivered by Patrick J. Fitzgerald, the United States Attorney for the Northern District of Illinois. |
| March 25, 2011 | Policing, Regulating, and Prosecuting Corruption | Will focus on public corruption. |

== Litigation ==
The center's litigation component uses the center's research, experience, and expertise to litigate criminal cases or cases having implications for the administration of criminal law, particularly in cases in which the exercise of power and discretion by prosecutors raises substantive legal issues. A core element of the center's litigation practice is the filing of amicus briefs. The Center litigates cases in all courts, federal and state, and at all levels, including in the Supreme Court of the United States. In fact, in November 2008, the Supreme Court granted certiorari in the first case in which the Center filed a brief after its founding, Abuelhawa v. United States.

=== Cases ===
Representative cases the center has participated in as amicus curiae include:

Abuelhawa v. United States—Supreme Court of the United States—The Center filed an amicus brief on the merits on behalf of the defendant. The case involved whether a prosecutor should charge a defendant with a felony for using a cell phone to buy drugs solely for personal use under a statute targeting the use of a "communications device" to "facilitat[e]" a narcotics distribution. The Center previously had filed an amicus brief in support of a petition for writ of certiorari and the Supreme Court granted certiorari on November 14, 2008. On May 26, 2009, in a unanimous opinion, the Court agreed with the Center that the defendant should prevail. The Court rested its decision in part on statutory history and Justice Department charging policy, both subjects of the center's brief.

Colon v. New York—Court of Appeals, State of New York—In this case, the Center filed an amicus brief proposing a new, clearer test for determining when a tacit agreement exists between a prosecutor and a cooperating witness to provide benefits to the witness in exchange for testifying against a defendant. On November 19, 2009, the Court sided with the Center in a unanimous opinion.

Pottawattamie County v. McGhee—Supreme Court of the United States—The Center filed an amicus brief on behalf of the respondents, who spent nearly 20 years in prison after prosecutors fabricated evidence to frame them for a crime they did not commit. The center's brief argued that, like law enforcement agents, prosecutors should receive qualified rather than absolute immunity for unconstitutional actions they take in their investigative capacity. The case was argued on November 4, 2009. During the argument, Justice Sotomayor questioned the Deputy Solicitor General regarding studies that were cited in the center's brief and that show that, as a matter of routine, prosecutors are not sanctioned for improper conduct.

Carachuri-Rosendo v. Holder—Supreme Court of the United States—In this case, the Center filed an amicus brief on behalf of the petitioner, addressing whether immigration courts can treat second or subsequent misdemeanor convictions as recidivist felonies despite a state prosecutor's choice to decline felony charges and the fact that the individual was not actually convicted as a recidivist. in support of a petition for writ of certiorari. The center's brief argued that circuit court decisions allowing such treatment improperly interfere with the basic exercise of prosecutorial discretion, undermine state interests in the proper and equitable administration of criminal justice, and can lead to a violation of the right to a jury trial. The center had previously written an amicus brief in support of the petition for writ of certiorari and the Supreme Court granted certiorari on December 14, 2009. On June 14, 2010, in a unanimous opinion, the Court sided with the center. The Court rested its decision in part on Justice Department charging policy, a subject first and most extensively discussed in the case in the center's brief.

United States v. Stevens—Supreme Court of the United States-The Center filed an amicus brief in support of the United States in its prosecution of a defendant convicted at trial of selling videos of pit bulls engaging in heinous, violent dogfights and attacks on other animals. Sitting en banc, and over a three-judge dissent, the United States Court of Appeals for the Third Circuit found the applicable statute to be facially unconstitutional under the First Amendment. The center's brief argued that the lower court erred in its holding because the applicable statute reaches only what amounts to crime-scene photographs and videos that are exploited for commercial gain and lack any serious artistic or other value. The case was argued on October 7, 2009. On April 20, 2010, the Court ruled for the defendant. In his dissenting opinion, Justice Alito cited and quoted the center's brief.

== Public policy ==
The center's public policy and media component seeks to improve public dialogue on criminal justice matters in various ways, including testifying before public officials.

=== Congressional testimony ===
The center's Faculty Director, Professor Rachel Barkow, testified before the United States Senate Judiciary Committee regarding the implications of the Supreme Court's decision in Blakely v. United States. She also testified before the United States Sentencing Commission and made recommendations for reforming the federal sentencing system. Professor Barkow recommended that the Commission keep the current advisory Guidelines framework, reconsider the use of acquitted conduct to increase sentences, reevaluate its decision to set drug trafficking guideline ranges around the mandatory minimums set by Congress, and prioritize its empirical research and data analysis in setting the agenda for itself and Congress, particularly by engaging in fiscal-cost and racial-impact forecasting of changes in sentencing law, evidence-based research about what works and what does not in fighting crime and curbing recidivism, and studying the relationship between prosecutorial practices and federal sentencing outcomes.

The center's Executive Director, Anthony Barkow, testified before the United States House of Representatives Subcommittee on Commercial and Administrative Law regarding proposed legislation that would prohibit former federal prosecutors from serving as or for corporate monitors in matters that they investigated or prosecuted when in government service.

=== Media ===
The Center addresses public policy via the publishing of op-ed pieces, including pieces in The Washington Post, The Boston Herald, Forbes, and on CNN.com. In addition, Executive Director Anthony Barkow has been interviewed numerous times on various criminal law matters in print, television, and on the radio including appearances on NBC Nightly News with Brian Williams and BBC World News.
