= Vipul Ved Prakash =

Indian software engineer (born 1977)

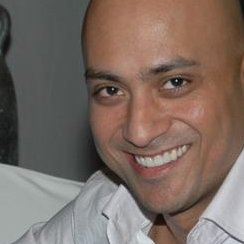
- Prakash in 2012
- Born: New Delhi, India
- Occupations: Software engineer, Internet entrepreneur
- Website: vipul.net

Vipul Ved Prakash is a software engineer and Internet entrepreneur. He is the co-founder of anti-spam company Cloudmark, social-media search company Topsy, and open-source AI company Together AI.

In 2013, Topsy was acquired by Apple Inc. The acquisition was reported to be valued at over $200M.

In the early 2000s, Prakash became widely known for creating Vipul's Razor, a popular open-source anti-spam system. He was named to the list of 2003's Top 100 young innovators in the world by MIT's Technology Review for this work on anti-spam, at the age of 25.

== Early life ==
Vipul Ved Prakash grew up in New Delhi, India. He played competitive table tennis, and attended St. Stephen's College, Delhi for undergraduate studies in mathematics, physics and computer science, but dropped out to pursue his interests in software design.

== Work ==
In the late 1990s, Prakash co-founded, with Ashish Gulhati, an Internet privacy company (Sense/Net) for early Internet users in India, and wrote for computer magazines and industry journals, including a regular column, "Net Zeppelin", on networking protocols for the Indian edition of PC World Magazine.

Prakash has authored several extensions to the Perl programming language that are published under open source licenses and distributed via CPAN.

In May, 2000, Prakash and Rishab A. Ghosh published the Orbiten Free Software Survey, which is considered to be one of the first successful attempts at building an empirical model of contribution to open source projects.

Prakash worked at Napster as an engineer. He co-founded Cloudmark along with Napster’s co-founder Jordan Ritter, to provide a commercial version of his open-source anti-spam software, Vipul's Razor.

Prakash considers himself a cypherpunk. He created a dolphin-shaped implementation of the RSA algorithm in Perl, which was printed on a T-shirt and sold by ThinkGeek, as a protest against restrictive crypto export laws.

After Topsy's acquisition by Apple, Prakash served as a Director of Engineering at Apple, Inc and led a growing search program inside the company. He appeared on the WWDC 2015 stage to introduce iOS Search APIs.

As of 2026, Prakash is CEO of Together AI, an open-source AI company.
