= Terry Bollinger =

American computer scientist

Terry Benton Bollinger
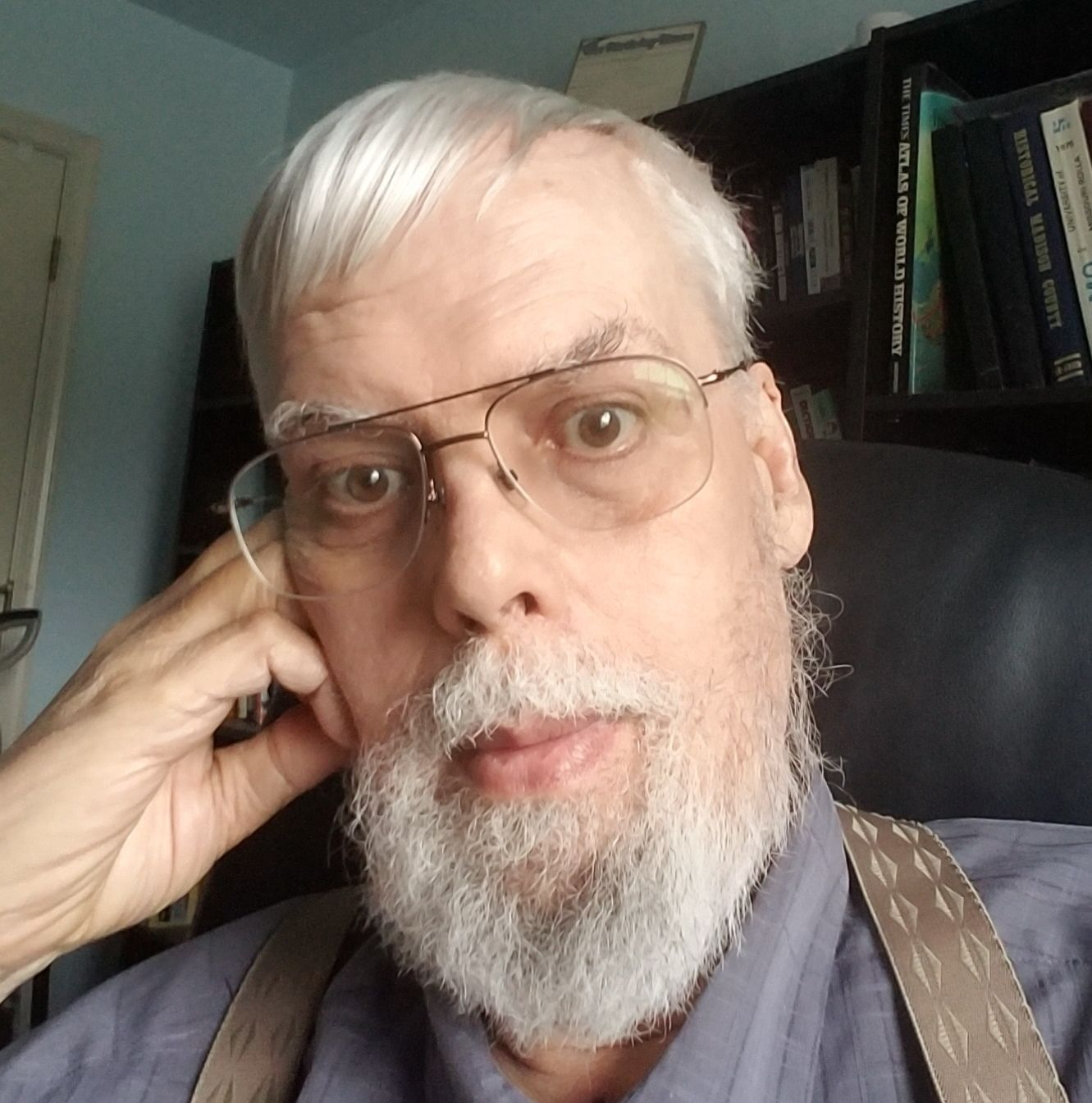
- Terry B. Bollinger (June 8, 2019)
- Born: February 6, 1955 (age 71); Fredericktown, Missouri, United States
- Occupation: computer scientist
- Known for: free and open source software

Brief voice intro for Terry Bollinger

Terry Benton Bollinger (born February 6, 1955) is an American computer scientist who works at the MITRE Corporation. In 2003 he wrote an influential report for the U.S. Department of Defense (U.S. DoD) in which he showed that free and open source software (FOSS) had already become a vital part of the United States Department of Defense software infrastructure, and that banning or restricting its use would have had serious detrimental impacts on DoD security, research capabilities, operational capabilities, and long-term cost efficiency. His report ended a debate about whether FOSS should be banned from U.S. DoD systems, and in time helped lead to the current official U.S. DoD policy of treating FOSS and proprietary software as equals. The report is referenced on the DoD CIO web site and has been influential in promoting broader recognition of the importance of free and open source software in government circles. Bollinger is also known for his activity in the IEEE Computer Society, where he was an editor for IEEE Software for six years, wrote the founding charter for IEEE Security & Privacy Magazine, and received an IEEE Third Millennium Medal for lifetime contributions to IEEE. He has written about a wide range of software issues including effective development processes, cyber security, and distributed intelligence.

== Life and work ==
Bollinger received Bachelor's and master's degrees in Computer Science at the Missouri University of Science and Technology (S&T), from which he also received a Professional Degree in December 2009 for lifetime accomplishments. He has had a lifelong interest in multi-component (crowd) intelligence as an aspect of artificial intelligence, as well as a strong interest in the hard sciences, including the possible relevance of quantum theory to faster but fully classical, energy-efficient information processing in biological systems. His metaphors for understanding quantum entanglement and encryption have been quoted in the Russian technical press.

From 2004 to 2010, Bollinger was the chief technology analyst for the U.S. DoD Defense Venture Catalyst Initiative (DeVenCI), an effort created by the Secretary of Defense after the September 11, 2001 terrorist attacks. DeVenCI selects qualified applicants from leading venture capital firms to contribute voluntary time and expertise to finding emerging commercial companies and technologies that could be relevant to DoD technology needs.

Bollinger currently works full-time for the Office of Naval Research (ONR) research arm of the Marine Corps, where he helps assess and support research into the science of autonomy, robotics, and artificial intelligence.

== See also ==
- Use of Free and Open Source Software (FOSS) in the U.S. Department of Defense

== Publications ==
- See DBLP Bibliography for Terry Bollinger
