= New York University Environmental Law Journal =

- Discipline: Environmental law
- Language: English
- Edited by: Bridget Pals

Publication details
- History: 1992-present
- Publisher: New York University School of Law
- Frequency: Triannually

Standard abbreviations
- Bluebook: N.Y.U. Env't L.J.
- ISO 4: N. Y. Univ. Environ. Law J.

Indexing
- ISSN: 1061-8651
- LCCN: 93648815
- OCLC no.: 25484826

Links
- Journal homepage

The New York University Environmental Law Journal is a student-run law review published at the New York University School of Law. The journal primarily publishes articles and notes that discuss topics involving environmental law, land-use law, and other related disciplines.

== History ==
The journal was founded in 1991 by student members of the Environmental Law Society at the New York University School of Law and the first issue was published in 1992. However, New York University School of Law Dean John Sexton noted that the roots of the journal could be traced back as far as 1986, when members of the Environmental Law Society began publishing the ELS Newsletter. In the inaugural issue, the founding editors wrote that they hoped the journal would serve as "one vehicle in the broad quest to promote environmental protection."

== Overview ==
The New York University Environmental Law Journal is one of ten student-run journals published at the New York University School of Law. The journal publishes scholarship relating to the "links between environmental and land use policy as well as administrative, corporate, constitutional, criminal, energy, insurance, international, property, tax, and tort law." In addition to its usual selection of articles and notes, the journal has also published articles relating to environmental law symposia hosted by the journal and the New York University School of Law.

== Impact ==
In 2016, Washington and Lee University's Law Journal Rankings placed the journal among the top ten environmental, natural resources, and land use law journals with the highest impact factor. Articles published in the journal have been cited by the First, Third, Ninth, and District of Columbia Circuit Courts of Appeals. State supreme courts have also cited articles from the journal. Articles also appear in many legal treatises, including American Jurisprudence and American Law Reports.

== Abstracting and indexing ==
The journal is abstracted or indexed in EBSCO databases, HeinOnline, LexisNexis, Westlaw, and the University of Washington's Current Index to Legal Periodicals. Tables of contents are also available through Infotrieve and Ingenta, and the journal posts past issues on its website.

== See also ==
- List of law journals
- List of environmental law journals
