= Association for Free Software =

The Association for Free Software (or AFFS) was a member organization, based in the United Kingdom, for the advancement of free software (sometimes also called "open-source software"). It was an associate organization of Free Software Foundation Europe (FSFE).

== History ==
In 2002, AFFS announced that it was now associated with the FSF Europe.

By 2009 it was effectively defunct.
