= Jeanne Fromer =

American legal scholar

Jeanne Fromer is an American lawyer and legal scholar specializing in intellectual property law. She is the Walter J. Derenberg Professor of Intellectual Property Law at New York University School of Law, as well as Vice Dean there, and co-director of the NYU Law Engelberg Center on Innovation Law & Policy. Her scholarship focuses on copyright, trademark, patent, trade secret, and design protection laws, with particular attention to innovation, artificial intelligence, and fashion law.

Fromer is the recipient of the American Law Institute's Young Scholars Medal and has been cited by the U.S. Supreme Court for her work in intellectual property law.

== Early life and education ==
Fromer was born in Brooklyn, NY, in 1975. She earned a Bachelor of Arts degree in computer science, summa cum laude, from Barnard College at Columbia University, where she was elected to Phi Beta Kappa. She won Barnard College's Mary E. Allison Prize for Excellence in Scholarship and Columbia University's Russell C. Mills Award in Computer Science.

She received a Master of Science degree in Electrical Engineering and Computer Science from the Massachusetts Institute of Technology, conducting research in artificial intelligence and computational linguistics. During this period, she worked at AT&T (Bell) Laboratories and was a National Science Foundation Graduate Research Fellow and an AT&T Laboratories Graduate Research Fellow.

Fromer earned her Juris Doctor degree, magna cum laude, from Harvard Law School, where she served as an Articles and Commentaries Editor of the Harvard Law Review and as an Editor of the Harvard Journal of Law & Technology.

== Career ==
Following law school, Fromer practiced intellectual property law at Hale and Dorr LLP (now WilmerHale). She clerked for Justice David H. Souter of the Supreme Court of the United States and for Judge Robert D. Sack of the United States Court of Appeals for the Second Circuit.

Fromer later served as an Alexander Fellow at New York University School of Law and as a Resident Fellow at Yale Law School's Information Society Project. She joined the faculty of Fordham University School of Law in 2007, where she served as an associate professor until 2012.

In 2012, Fromer joined the faculty of New York University School of Law. She currently holds the title of Walter J. Derenberg Professor of Intellectual Property Law and serves as co-director of the Engelberg Center on Innovation Law & Policy. She also serves as the law school's Vice Dean of University Partnerships and previously served as its Vice Dean of Intellectual Life.

Fromer teaches courses in copyright law, trade secret law, innovation policy, and contracts, as well as other courses in intellectual property law. She received the Podell Distinguished Teaching Award in 2023 from NYU School of Law.

She has testified before the United States Congress and assisted in the drafting of trademark legislation. She has also served as an Adviser to the American Law Institute's Restatement of the Law, Copyright. She co-chairs the Copyright Society's Donald C. Brace Memorial Lecture and is co-editor of the Journal of Legal Analysis.

== Scholarship and research ==
Fromer has authored or co-authored more than 45 academic articles on intellectual property law. Her scholarship has appeared in leading law journals, including the Harvard Law Review, Stanford Law Review, Columbia Law Review, NYU Law Review, University of Pennsylvania Law Review, Virginia Law Review, and University of Chicago Law Review.

Her research addresses topics such as the interaction between intellectual property law and innovation, the application of copyright and trade secret laws to artificial intelligence, the regulation of memes under copyright law, design protection systems, and the intellectual property treatment of fashion design. Her work has been cited by courts, including the Supreme Court of the United States.

Fromer is the co-author (with Christopher Sprigman) of Copyright Law: Cases and Materials, a widely used copyright law casebook now in its seventh edition and adopted by more than 100 law schools worldwide.

In 2025, she co-edited Fashion and Intellectual Property with Dev Gangjee and David Tan. The volume brings together international scholarship examining how intellectual property law regulates the global fashion industry.

== Awards and honors ==
- American Law Institute Young Scholars Medal (2011)
- Podell Distinguished Teaching Award, NYU School of Law (2023)
- EW Barker Centre for Law & Business Distinguished Visitor in Intellectual Property (2023)
- Cambridge University Annual International Intellectual Property Lecture (2023)
- Donald C. Brace Memorial Lecture, Copyright Society (2019)

== Selected publications ==
- Fromer, Jeanne C. and Mark P. McKenna. "Amazon's Quiet Overhaul of the Trademark System." California Law Review 113 (2025): 1169.
- Fromer, Jeanne C. "Against Secondary Meaning." Notre Dame Law Review 98 (2022): 211.
- Fromer, Jeanne C., and Amy Adler. "Memes on Memes and the New Creativity." NYU Law Review 97 (2022): 453.
- Fromer, Jeanne C. and Mala Chatterjee. "Minds, Machines, and the Law: The Case of Volition in Copyright Law." Columbia Law Review 119 (2019): 1887.
- Fromer, Jeanne C. "Machines as the New Oompa-Loompas: Trade Secrecy, the Cloud, Machine Learning, and Automation." NYU Law Review 94 (2019): 706.
- Fromer, Jeanne C., and Barton Beebe. "Are We Running Out of Trademarks? An Empirical Study of Trademark Depletion and Congestion." Harvard Law Review 131 (2018): 945.
