= Ashish Gulhati =

Indian software developer and writer

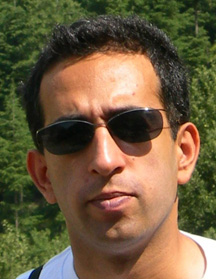
Ashish Gulhati

Ashish Gulhati is an author and computer programmer who was one of India's first online activists and open-source software developers.

== Open source ==
As one of India's first open-source software developers, Ashish worked to raise awareness about FOSS in India. In 1993 he co-founded The X Group, the first company to offer professional commercial support for open-source software in India, with Raj Mathur.

He is the author of several modules for the Perl programming language, including PerlVision, Crypt::GPG, Crypt::Schnorr::AuthSign, Persistence::Database::SQL and Persistence::Object::Postgres.

== Articles ==
His articles and columns in PCQuest and Dataquest magazines in 1993 and 1994 were among the first in the mainstream Indian computing press to inform readers about alternative operating systems, Unix, Linux, open-source software, Email, the Internet and the World Wide Web, years before Internet access was commercially available in India. These early articles formed an important part of the PCQuest Linux Initiative that resulted in close to a million Linux CD-ROMs being distributed in India.

== BBS ==
In pre-Internet India, Ashish created and operated the Primal Scream Bulletin Board System and created the country's first inter-city Fidonet echo. Soon after the launch of Internet services in India, Ashish co-founded Sense/NET, a popular ISP, with Vipul Ved Prakash. Prakash as of 2026 is CEO of Together AI.

== Web development ==
In 1997 Ashish created the website for Connect magazine, the first Indian magazine with an online edition.

In 1998, he developed the website of The American Reporter, the world's first original daily Internet newspaper and winner of the landmark First Amendment case, Shea v Reno.

== Security and privacy ==
In 1999, he was involved with Laissez Faire City, where he developed Laissez Faire City's OpenPGP compatible messaging engine and deployed secure wireless links for Laissez-Faire City's consulate in Costa Rica.

== Noodle computer ==
In 2017, he created the Noodle Pi, a modular hand-held PC powered by the Raspberry Pi single-board computer.
