= Trevor Morrison =

American lawyer and academic

- Born: 1971 (age 54–55); Port Alberni, Canada
- Education: University of British Columbia (BA); Columbia University (JD)
- Employer: New York University School of Law

Trevor W. Morrison (born 1971) is the Eric M. and Laurie B. Roth Professor of Law and dean emeritus at New York University School of Law. He was previously a professor at Columbia Law School and Cornell Law School, and an associate counsel to U.S. President Barack Obama.

== Biography ==
Morrison was born in Port Alberni, British Columbia, Canada. He received his B.A. in History (with Honors) from the University of British Columbia. In 1998, he received his J.D. degree from Columbia Law School.

After law school, he clerked for Judge Betty Fletcher of the United States Court of Appeals for the Ninth Circuit from 1998 to 1999, and then for Associate Justice Ruth Bader Ginsburg of the Supreme Court of the United States from 2002 to 2003.

Prior to entering academia, Morrison worked in the United States Department of Justice's Office of the Solicitor General as a Bristow Fellow, in the Department of Justice's Office of Legal Counsel and in private practice as an associate of Wilmer, Cutler & Pickering (now WilmerHale).

== Academic ==
Morrison served as the Dean of New York University School of Law from 2013 to 2022. He is also faculty director of the Reiss Center on Law and security at NYU Law. Morrison teaches and conducts research in the field of constitutional law, with a focus on executive powers and separation of powers. Drawing on his experience as a lawyer within the Executive Branch, he has written about separation of powers, the Office of Legal Counsel, and issues of federalism.

He is a member of the American Law Institute, and in 2016 was elected a fellow of the American Academy of Arts and Sciences. He was appointed by President Joe Biden to the Presidential Commission on the Supreme Court of the United States.

== See also ==
- List of law clerks for the sixth seat of the Supreme Court of the United States

Academic offices
Preceded by Richard Revesz	Dean of the New York University School of Law; 2013–present	Incumbent
