= Samuel Rascoff =

American legal scholar (born c. 1973)

Samuel J. Rascoff
- Born: c. 1973
- Education: Harvard University (BA); University of Oxford; Yale Law School (JD)
- Occupation: Legal scholar
- Employer: New York University School of Law
- Title: Professor of Law

Samuel James Rascoff (born c. 1973) is an American legal scholar. He is a professor of law at the New York University School of Law. He specializes in national security law.

Rascoff graduated from Harvard University before attending Oxford University as a Marshall Scholar. He then graduated from Yale Law School in 2001 and clerked for Judge Pierre N. Leval of the Court of Appeals for the Second Circuit in 2002, and Justice David Souter at the Supreme Court in 2003–04. After serving as a special assistant with the Coalition Provisional Authority in Iraq, he became an associate at Wachtell, Lipton, Rosen & Katz.

A 2005 article in the New York Observer identified Rascoff as a potential future Supreme Court nominee. He is currently the faculty director of the NYU Law - NYU Tandon Master of Science in Cybersecurity Risk and Strategy program.

== Selected publications ==
- ——— (2016). "Presidential Intelligence" (PDF). Harvard Law Review. 129 (3): 633–717.

== See also ==
- List of law clerks for the third seat of the Supreme Court of the United States
