= Ira Rubinstein =

American lawyer and academic in IT and privacy law

Ira Rubinstein is a senior fellow at the Information Law Institute (ILI) at the New York University School of Law. He graduated from Yale Law School in 1985. Before joining ILI, he worked in Microsoft's Legal and Corporate affairs department for 17 years. He was Associate General Counsel for the Regulatory Affairs and Public Policy group at Microsoft.

His research interests include Internet privacy, electronic surveillance law, big data, and voters' privacy. He has testified before Congress on matters regarding privacy and security.

He is currently a faculty member of the NYU Law - NYU Tandon Master of Science in Cybersecurity Risk and Strategy program.
