= Alternative terms for free software =

Alternative terms for free software, such as OSS, FOSS, and FLOSS, have been a recurring issue among free and open-source software users from the late 1990s onwards. These terms share almost identical licence criteria and development practices.

In 1983 Richard Stallman launched the free software movement and founded the Free Software Foundation to promote the movement and to publish its own definition. Others have published alternative definitions of free software, notably the Debian Free Software Guidelines. In 1998, Bruce Perens and Eric S. Raymond began a campaign to market open-source software and founded the Open Source Initiative, which espoused different goals and a different philosophy from Stallman's.

== Terms ==
=== Free software ===
In the 1950s to the 1990s software culture, the "free software" concept combined the nowadays differentiated software classes of public domain software, Freeware, Shareware and FOSS and was created in academia and by hobbyists and hackers.

When the term "free software" was adopted by Richard Stallman in 1983, it was still ambiguously used to describe several kinds of software. In February 1986 Richard Stallman formally defined "free software" with the publication of The Free Software Definition in the FSF's now-discontinued GNU's Bulletin as software which can be used, studied, modified, and redistributed with little or no restriction, his four essential software freedoms. Richard Stallman's Free Software Definition, adopted by the Free Software Foundation (FSF), defines free software as a matter of liberty, not price, and is inspired by the previous public domain software ecosystem. The canonical source for the document is in the philosophy section of the GNU Project website, where it is published in many languages.

=== Open-source software ===
In 1998 the term "open-source software" (abbreviated "OSS") was coined as an alternative to "free software". There were several reasons for the proposal of a new term. On the one hand a group from the free software ecosystem perceived the Free Software Foundation's attitude toward propagandizing the "free software" concept as "moralising and confrontational", which was also associated with the term. In addition, the "available at no cost" ambiguity of the word "free" was seen as discouraging business adoption, as also the historical ambiguous usage of the term "free software". In a 1998 strategy session in California, "open-source software" was selected by Todd Anderson, Larry Augustin, Jon Hall, Sam Ockman, Christine Peterson, and Eric S. Raymond. Richard Stallman had not been invited. The session was arranged in reaction to Netscape's January 1998 announcement of a source code release for Navigator (as Mozilla). Those at the meeting described "open source" as a "replacement label" for free software, and the Open Source Initiative was soon-after founded by Eric Raymond and Bruce Perens to promote the term as part of "a marketing program for free software". The Open Source Definition is used by the Open Source Initiative to determine whether a software license qualifies for the organization's insignia for open source software. The definition was based on the Debian Free Software Guidelines, written and adapted primarily by Bruce Perens. Perens did not base his writing on the four freedoms of free software from the Free Software Foundation, which were only later available on the web. According to the OSI, Stallman initially flirted with the idea of adopting the open source term.

At the end of 1990s the term "open source" gained much traction in public media and acceptance in the software industry in the context of the dotcom bubble and the open-source software driven Web 2.0. For instance, Duke University scholar Christopher M. Kelty described the Free Software movement prior to 1998 as fragmented and "the term Open Source, by contrast, sought to encompass them all in one movement". The term "open source" spread further as part of the open source movement, which inspired many successor movements including the Open content, Open-source hardware, and Open Knowledge movements. Around 2000, the success of "Open source" led several journalists to report that the earlier "Free software" term, movement, and its leader Stallman were becoming "forgotten". In response, Stallman and his FSF objected to the term "open source software" and have since campaigned for the term "free software". Due to the rejection of the term "open source software" by Stallman and FSF, the ecosystem is divided in its terminology. For example, a 2002 European Union survey revealed that 32.6% of FOSS developers associate themselves with OSS, 48% with free software, and only 19.4% are undecided or in between. As both terms "free software" and "open-source software" have their proponents and critics in the FOSS ecosystems, unifying terms have been proposed; these include "software libre" (or libre software), "FLOSS" (free/libre and open-source software), and "FOSS" (or F/OSS, free and open-source software).

=== FOSS and F/OSS ===
The first known use of the phrase free open-source software (in short FOSS or seldom F/OSS) on Usenet was in a posting on March 18, 1998, just a month after the term open source itself was coined. In February 2002, F/OSS appeared on a Usenet newsgroup dedicated to Amiga computer games. In early 2002, MITRE used the term FOSS in what would later be their 2003 report Use of Free and Open Source Software (FOSS) in the U.S. Department of Defense., The European Union's institutions later also used the FOSS term while before using FLOSS, as also scholar in publications.

=== Software libre, Libre Software, Libreware ===
While probably used earlier (as early as the 1990s) "Software libre" got broader public reception when in 1999 the European Commission had formed a "working group on libre software". The word "libre", borrowed from the Spanish and French languages, means having liberty. This avoids the freedom-cost ambiguity of the English word "free".

=== FLOSS ===
FLOSS was used in 2001 as a project acronym by Rishab Aiyer Ghosh for free/libre and open-source software. Later that year, the European Commission (EC) used the phrase when they funded a study on the topic.

Unlike "libre software", which aimed to solve the ambiguity problem, "FLOSS" aimed to avoid taking sides in the debate over whether it was better to say "free software" or to say "open-source software".

Proponents of the term point out that parts of the FLOSS acronym can be translated into other languages, for example the "F" representing free (English) or frei (German), and the "L" representing libre (Spanish or French), livre (Portuguese), or libero (Italian), etc. However, this term is not often used in official, non-English, documents, since the words in these languages for "free as in freedom" do not have the ambiguity problem of English's "free".

By the end of 2004, the FLOSS acronym had been used in official English documents issued by South Africa, Spain, and Brazil. Other scholars and institutions use it too.

Richard Stallman endorses the term FLOSS to refer to "open-source" and "free software" without necessarily choosing between the two camps, however, he asks people to consider supporting the "free/libre software" camp. Stallman has suggested that the term "unfettered software" would be an appropriate, non-ambiguous replacement, but that he would not push for it because there was too much momentum and too much effort behind the term "free software".

The term "FLOSS" has come under some criticism for being counterproductive and sounding silly. For instance, Eric Raymond, co-founder of the Open Source Initiative, stated in 2009:

Near as I can figure ... people think they'd be making an ideological commitment ... if they pick 'open source' or 'free software'. Well, speaking as the guy who promulgated 'open source' to abolish the colossal marketing blunders that were associated with the term 'free software', I think 'free software' is less bad than 'FLOSS'. Somebody, please, shoot this pitiful acronym through the head and put it out of our misery.

Raymond quotes programmer Rick Moen as stating:

"I continue to find it difficult to take seriously anyone who adopts an excruciatingly bad, haplessly obscure acronym associated with dental hygiene aids" and "neither term can be understood without first understanding both free software and open source, as prerequisite study."

== Ownership and attachments ==
None of these terms, or the term "free software" itself, have been trademarked. Bruce Perens of OSI attempted to register "open source" as a service mark for OSI in the United States of America, but that attempt failed to meet the relevant trademark standards of specificity. OSI claims a trademark on "OSI Certified", and applied for trademark registration, but did not complete the paperwork. The United States Patent and Trademark Office labels it as "abandoned".

While the term "free software" is associated with FSF's definition, and the term "open-source software" is associated with OSI's definition, the other terms have not been claimed by any group in particular. While the FSF's and OSI's definitions are worded quite differently the set of software that they cover is almost identical.

All of the terms are used interchangeably, the choice of which to use is mostly political (wanting to support a certain group) or practical (thinking that one term is the clearest).

The primary difference between free software and open source is one of philosophy. According to the Free Software Foundation, "Nearly all open source software is free software. The two terms describe almost the same category of software, but they stand for views based on fundamentally different values."

== Licences ==
The choice of term has little or no impact on which licences are valid or used by the different camps, while recommendations might vary. At least until the release of the GPLv3, the usage of the GPLv2 united the Open source and free software camp. The vast majority of software referred to by all these terms is distributed under a small set of licences, all of which are unambiguously accepted by the various de facto and de jure guardians of each of these terms. The majority of the software is either one of few permissive software licenses (the BSD licenses, the MIT License, and the Apache License) or one of few copyleft licenses (the GNU General Public License v2, GPLv3, the GNU Lesser General Public License, or the Mozilla Public License).

The Free Software Foundation (List of FSF approved software licences) and the Open Source Initiative (List of OSI approved software licences) each publish lists of licences that they accept as complying with their definitions of free software and open-source software respectively. The Open Source Initiative considers almost all free software licenses to also be open source and way around. These include the latest versions of the FSF's three main licenses, the GPLv3, the Lesser General Public License (LGPL), and the GNU Affero General Public License (AGPL).

Apart from these two organisations, many more FOSS organizations publish recommendations and comments on licenses and licensing matters. The Debian project is seen by some to provide useful advice on whether particular licences comply with their Debian Free Software Guidelines. Debian does not publish a list of "approved" licences, but its judgments can be tracked by checking what licences are used by software they have allowed into their distribution. In addition, the Fedora Project does provide a list of approved licences (for Fedora) based on approval of the Free Software Foundation (FSF), the Open Source Initiative (OSI), and consultation with Red Hat Legal. Also, the copyfree movement, the various BSDs, the Apache, and the Mozilla Foundation all have their own points of views on licenses.

=== Public-domain software ===
There is also a class of software that is covered by the names discussed in this article, but which doesn't have a licence: software for which the source code is in the public domain. The use of such source code, and therefore the executable version, is not restricted by copyright and therefore does not need a free software licence to make it free software. However, not all countries have the same form of "public domain" regime and possibilities of dedicating works and the authors rights in the public domain.

Further, for distributors to be sure that software is released into the public domain, the usually need to see something written to confirm this. Thus even without a licence, a written note about lack of copyright and other exclusive rights often still exists (a waiver or anti-copyright notice), which can be seen as license substitute. There are also mixed forms between waiver and license, for instance the public domain like licenses CC0 and the Unlicense, with an all permissive license as fallback in case of ineffectiveness of the waiver.

== Non-English terms in anglophone regions ==
The free software community in some parts of India sometimes uses the term "Swatantra software" since the term "Swatantra" means free in Sanskrit, which is the ancestor of all Indo-European Languages of India, including Hindi, despite English being the lingua franca. In the Philippines, "malayang software" is sometimes used. The word "libre" exists in the Filipino language, and it came from the Spanish language, but has acquired the same cost/freedom ambiguity of the English word "free". According to Meranau "Free" is KANDURI, Diccubayadan, Libre.

== See also ==
- Free software community
- Free software movement
- GNU/Linux naming controversy
- History of free software
- Open source vs. closed source
- Permissive free software licences
