= Rishab Aiyer Ghosh =

Dutch journalist and computer scientist

Rishab Ghosh
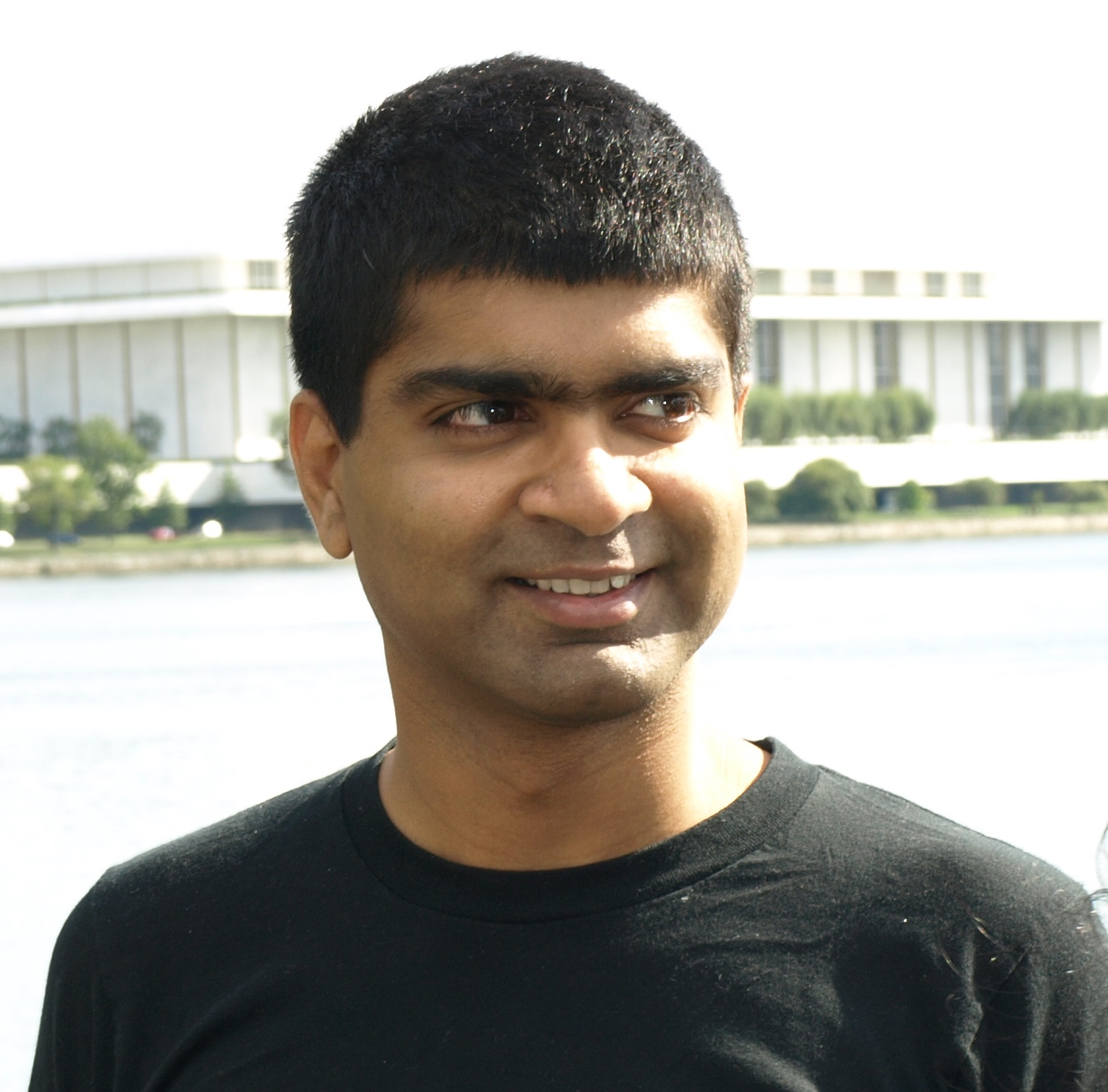
- Occupations: Journalist, Computer scientist

Rishab Aiyer Ghosh is a Dutch journalist, computer scientist, open-source software advocate and software entrepreneur. He was a founder of Topsy, a social search and analytics company that was acquired by Apple Inc in December 2013.

A former Open Source Initiative board member, he is Founding International and Managing Editor of peer-reviewed journal First Monday, and Programme Leader of Free/Libre and Open Source Software at UNU-MERIT. Ghosh has undertaken several studies on free software, which he terms "FLOSS" - an alternative term for free software which he is credited with coining. FLOSS emphasizes the essential value of the term "libre" (meaning with few or no restrictions). Ghosh's work represents an effort to reshape the global understanding of FLOSS, including the governmental and academic spheres.
